= Kinnock shadow cabinet =

Shadow Cabinet of the United Kingdom from 1983 to 1992

Kinnock Shadow Cabinet
- Shadow Cabinet of the United Kingdom
- 1983 – 1992
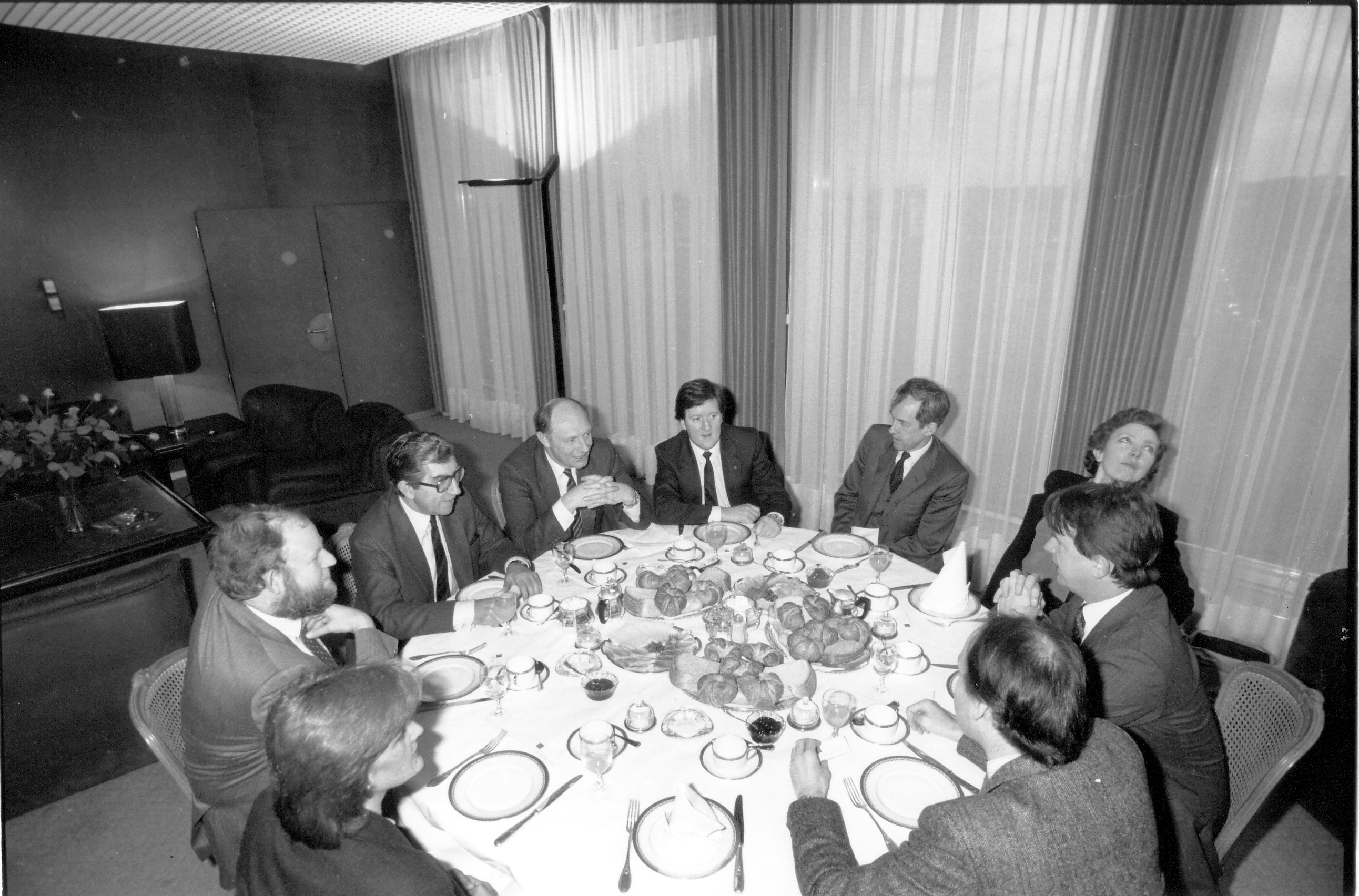
- Kinnock with members of his shadow cabinet during a visit to the Commission of the European Communities in 1988
- Date formed: 2 October 1983
- Date dissolved: 18 July 1992

People and organisations
- Monarch: Elizabeth II
- Leader of the Opposition: Neil Kinnock
- Deputy Leader of the Opposition: Roy Hattersley
- Member party: Labour Party
- Status in legislature: Official Opposition

History
- Election: 1983 Labour Party leadership election
- Legislature terms: 49th UK Parliament; 50th UK Parliament; 51st UK Parliament
- Predecessor: Foot shadow cabinet
- Successor: Smith shadow cabinet

Neil Kinnock was Leader of the Labour Party and Leader of the Opposition from 2 October 1983 to 18 July 1992. He convincingly defeated Roy Hattersley, Eric Heffer, and Peter Shore in the 1983 leadership election, which was prompted by Michael Foot's resignation following the disastrous general election result earlier that year. Kinnock's period as Leader encompassed the bulk of the Thatcher premiership and the first two years of the Major premiership. Kinnock resigned in 1992 after losing his second election as Leader.

== Shadow Cabinet ==
Portfolio	Shadow Minister	Term
Leader of Her Majesty's Most Loyal Opposition; Leader of the Labour Party	The Rt Hon. Neil Kinnock MP	1983–1992
Deputy Leader of Her Majesty's Most Loyal Opposition; Deputy Leader of the Labour Party	The Rt Hon. Roy Hattersley MP	1983–1992
Shadow Chancellor of the Exchequer	The Rt Hon. Roy Hattersley MP	1983–1987
Shadow Chancellor of the Exchequer	The Rt Hon. John Smith MP	1987–1992
Shadow Foreign Secretary	The Rt Hon. Denis Healey MP	1983–1987
Shadow Foreign Secretary	The Rt Hon. Gerald Kaufman MP	1987–1992
Shadow Home Secretary	The Rt Hon. Gerald Kaufman MP	1983–1987
Shadow Home Secretary	The Rt Hon. Roy Hattersley MP	1987–1992
Shadow Secretary of State for Defence	The Rt Hon. John Silkin MP	1983–1984
Shadow Secretary of State for Defence	The Rt Hon. Denzil Davies MP	1984–1988
Shadow Secretary of State for Defence	Martin O'Neill MP	1988–1992
Shadow Secretary of State for Trade and Industry	The Rt Hon. Peter Shore MP	1983–1984
Shadow Secretary of State for Trade and Industry	The Rt Hon. John Smith MP	1984–1987
Shadow Secretary of State for Trade and Industry	Bryan Gould MP	1987–1989
Shadow Secretary of State for Trade and Industry	Gordon Brown MP	1989–1992
Shadow Leader of the House of Commons	The Rt Hon. Peter Shore MP	1983–1987
Shadow Leader of the House of Commons	Frank Dobson MP	1987–1989
Shadow Leader of the House of Commons	Jack Cunningham MP	1989–1992
Shadow Secretary of State for the Environment	Jack Cunningham MP	1983–1989
Shadow Secretary of State for the Environment	Bryan Gould MP	1989–1992
Shadow Secretary of State for Housing and Construction	Eric Heffer MP	1983–1984
Shadow Secretary of State for Social Security	Michael Meacher MP	1989–1992
Shadow Secretary of State for Health and Social Services	Michael Meacher MP	1983–1987
Shadow Secretary of State for Health and Social Services	Robin Cook MP	1987–1989
Shadow Secretary of State for Health	Robin Cook MP	1989–1992
Shadow Secretary of State for Education	Giles Radice MP	1983–1987
Shadow Secretary of State for Education	Jack Straw MP	1987–1992
Shadow Secretary of State for Employment	The Rt Hon. John Smith MP	1983–1984
Shadow Secretary of State for Employment	John Prescott MP	1984–1987
Shadow Secretary of State for Employment	Michael Meacher MP	1987–1989
Shadow Secretary of State for Employment	Tony Blair MP	1989–1992
Shadow Secretary of State for Transport	John Prescott MP	1983–1984
Shadow Secretary of State for Transport	John Prescott MP	1988–1992
Shadow Secretary of State for Transport	Gwyneth Dunwoody MP	1984–1985
Shadow Secretary of State for Transport	Robert Hughes MP	1985–1988
Shadow Secretary of State for Energy	Stan Orme MP	1983–1987
Shadow Secretary of State for Energy	John Prescott MP	1987–1988
Shadow Secretary of State for Energy	Tony Blair MP	1988–1989
Shadow Secretary of State for Energy	Frank Dobson MP	1989–1992
Shadow Minister of Agriculture, Fisheries and Food	Robert Hughes MP	1983–1984
Shadow Minister of Agriculture, Fisheries and Food	Brynmor John MP	1984–1987
Shadow Minister of Agriculture, Fisheries and Food	David Clark MP	1987–1992
Shadow Secretary of State for Northern Ireland	The Rt Hon. Peter Archer MP	1983–1987
Shadow Secretary of State for Northern Ireland	Kevin McNamara MP	1987–1992
Shadow Secretary of State for Scotland	Donald Dewar MP	1983–1992
Shadow Secretary of State for Wales	Barry Jones MP	1983–1987
Shadow Secretary of State for Wales	Barry Jones MP	1989–1992
Shadow Secretary of State for Wales	The Rt Hon. Alan Williams MP	1987–1989
Shadow Minister for Europe	Robin Cook MP	1983–1984
Shadow Minister responsible for Status of Women	Jo Richardson MP	1983–1992
Shadow Attorney General; Principal frontbench spokesman on Legal Affairs	The Rt Hon. John Morris MP	1983–1992
Shadow Lord Chancellor	The Rt Hon. The Lord Elwyn-Jones PC	1983–1989
Shadow Lord Chancellor	Lord Mishcon	1989–1992
Leader of the Opposition in the House of Lords	The Rt Hon. The Lord Cledwyn of Penrhos PC	1983–1992
Opposition Chief Whip in the House of Commons	The Rt Hon. Michael Cocks MP	1983–1985
Opposition Chief Whip in the House of Commons	Derek Foster MP	1985–1992
Opposition Chief Whip in the House of Lords	The Lord Ponsonby of Shulbrede	1989–1990
Opposition Chief Whip in the House of Lords	Lord Graham of Edmonton	1990–1992

== Initial Shadow Cabinet ==
Kinnock announced his first Shadow Cabinet on 31 October 1983.

- Neil Kinnock – Leader of Her Majesty's Most Loyal Opposition and Leader of the Labour Party
- Roy Hattersley – Deputy Leader of the Labour Party and Shadow Chancellor of the Exchequer
- Denis Healey – Shadow Foreign Secretary
- Gerald Kaufman – Shadow Home Secretary
- John Silkin – Shadow Secretary of State for Defence
- Peter Shore – Shadow Secretary of State for Trade and Industry and Shadow Leader of the House of Commons
- Eric Heffer – Shadow Secretary of State for Housing and Construction and Labour Party Chairman
- Michael Meacher – Shadow Secretary of State for Health and Social Services
- Giles Radice – Shadow Secretary of State for Education
- John Prescott – Shadow Secretary of State for Transport
- John Smith – Shadow Secretary of State for Employment
- Stanley Orme – Shadow Secretary of State for Energy
- Bob Hughes – Shadow Minister of Agriculture, Fisheries and Food
- Jack Cunningham – Shadow Secretary of State for the Environment
- Donald Dewar – Shadow Secretary of State for Scotland
- Barry Jones – Shadow Secretary of State for Wales
- Peter Archer – Shadow Secretary of State for Northern Ireland
- Robin Cook – Shadow Minister for Europe
- Jo Richardson – Shadow Minister responsible for Women's Rights
- John Morris – Shadow Attorney General and principal frontbench spokesman for Legal Affairs
- The Lord Elwyn-Jones – Shadow Lord Chancellor
- The Lord Cledwyn of Penrhos – Leader of the Opposition in the House of Lords
- Michael Cocks – Opposition Chief Whip in the House of Commons
- The Lord Ponsonby of Shulbrede – Opposition Chief Whip in the House of Lords

== 1984 reshuffle ==
On 26 October 1984, Kinnock reshuffled his team in the wake of the 1984 Shadow Cabinet elections. Peter Shore remained Shadow Leader of the House, but Trade and Industry was transferred to John Smith, who was replaced as Shadow Employment Secretary by John Prescott. Gwyneth Dunwoody took over as Shadow Transport Secretary, having previously sat in the Shadow Cabinet without portfolio. Denzil Davies replaced Silkin as Shadow Defence Secretary Eric Heffer's was dropped from the Shadow Cabinet, as, it appears, his portfolio was as well. Brynmor John replaced Hughes as Shadow Agriculture Minister.

- Neil Kinnock – Leader of Her Majesty's Most Loyal Opposition and Leader of the Labour Party
- Roy Hattersley – Deputy Leader of the Labour Party and Shadow Chancellor of the Exchequer
- Denis Healey – Shadow Foreign Secretary
- Gerald Kaufman – Shadow Home Secretary
- Denzil Davies – Shadow Secretary of State for Defence
- John Smith – Shadow Secretary of State for Trade and Industry
- Peter Shore – Shadow Leader of the House of Commons
- Michael Meacher – Shadow Secretary of State for Health and Social Services
- Giles Radice – Shadow Secretary of State for Education
- Gwyneth Dunwoody – Shadow Secretary of State for Transport
- John Prescott – Shadow Secretary of State for Employment
- Stanley Orme – Shadow Secretary of State for Energy
- Brynmor John – Shadow Minister of Agriculture, Fisheries and Food
- Jack Cunningham – Shadow Secretary of State for the Environment
- Donald Dewar – Shadow Secretary of State for Scotland
- Barry Jones – Shadow Secretary of State for Wales
- Peter Archer – Shadow Secretary of State for Northern Ireland
- Robin Cook – Shadow Minister for Europe and Campaign co-ordinator
- Jo Richardson – Shadow Minister responsible for Women's Rights
- John Morris – Shadow Attorney General and principal frontbench spokesman for Legal Affairs
- The Lord Elwyn-Jones – Shadow Lord Chancellor
- The Lord Cledwyn of Penrhos – Leader of the Opposition in the House of Lords
- Michael Cocks – Opposition Chief Whip in the House of Commons
- The Lord Ponsonby of Shulbrede – Opposition Chief Whip in the House of Lords

=== Changes ===
- Entering the 1985/86 session of Parliament, Michael Cocks stepped down as Chief Whip, and Derek Foster, who had been Kinnock's Parliamentary Private Secretary, defeated the favourite, Norman Hogg, by one vote in the second round of the resulting election among Commons members of the Parliamentary Labour Party.
- Gwyneth Dunwoody lost in the 1985 Shadow Cabinet elections and was replaced by Robert Hughes as Shadow Transport Secretary.
- At the 1986 Shadow Cabinet elections, Bryan Gould and David Clark joined the shadow cabinet

== 1987 reshuffle ==
Kinnock reshuffled his Shadow Cabinet on 13 July 1987 in the aftermath of the general election loss. Denis Healey retired from the front bench and was replaced as Shadow Foreign Secretary by Kaufman, who was in turn replaced by Hattersley as Shadow Home Secretary. John Smith replaced the latter Shadow Chancellor. Bryan Gould replaced Smith as Shadow Trade and Industry Secretary, Alan Williams replaced Barry Jones as Shadow Welsh Secretary, and Kevin McNamara replaced Archer as Shadow Northern Ireland Secretary. Robin Cook replaced Meacher as Shadow Health Secretary, and Meacher took over Employment from Prescott, who in turn took the Energy portfolio, with Orme leaving Shadow Cabinet. Shore (Shadow Leader of the House), Radice (Shadow Education Secretary), and Brynmor John (Shadow Agriculture Minister) also left the front bench, being replaced by Frank Dobson, Jack Straw and David Clark, respectively. Gordon Brown was appointed Shadow Chief Secretary to the Treasury.

- Neil Kinnock – Leader of Her Majesty's Most Loyal Opposition and Leader of the Labour Party
- Roy Hattersley – Deputy Leader of the Labour Party and Shadow Home Secretary
- Gerald Kaufman – Shadow Foreign Secretary
- John Smith – Shadow Chancellor of the Exchequer
- Denzil Davies – Shadow Secretary of State for Defence
- Bryan Gould – Shadow Secretary of State for Trade and Industry
- Frank Dobson – Shadow Leader of the House of Commons and Campaign co-ordinator
- Robin Cook – Shadow Secretary of State for Health and Social Services
- Michael Meacher – Shadow Secretary of State for Employment
- Jack Straw – Shadow Secretary of State for Education
- Robert Hughes – Shadow Secretary of State for Transport
- John Prescott – Shadow Secretary of State for Energy
- David Clark – Shadow Minister of Agriculture, Fisheries and Food
- Jack Cunningham – Shadow Secretary of State for the Environment
- Gordon Brown – Shadow Chief Secretary to the Treasury
- Donald Dewar – Shadow Secretary of State for Scotland
- Alan Williams – Shadow Secretary of State for Wales
- Kevin McNamara – Shadow Secretary of State for Northern Ireland
- Jo Richardson – Shadow Minister responsible for Women's Rights
- John Morris – Shadow Attorney General and principal frontbench spokesman for Legal Affairs
- The Lord Elwyn-Jones – Shadow Lord Chancellor
- The Lord Cledwyn of Penrhos – Leader of the Opposition in the House of Lords
- Derek Foster – Opposition Chief Whip in the House of Commons
- The Lord Ponsonby of Shulbrede – Opposition Chief Whip in the House of Lords

=== Changes ===
- On 14 June 1988, Martin O'Neill replaced Denzil Davies as Shadow Defence Secretary after the latter resigned in protest over inadequate consultation over a change in the party's defence policy.
- Following the 1988 Shadow Cabinet elections in autumn, Tony Blair replaced Prescott at Energy, and Prescott returned to Transport. Hughes seems to have left the Shadow Cabinet.

== 1989 reshuffle ==
Following the 1989 Shadow Cabinet elections, Kinnock on 2 November reshuffled the Shadow Cabinet. Dobson replaced Blair as Shadow Energy Secretary. Joining the Shadow Cabinet, Tony Blair took Meacher's portfolio, Employment. Robin Cook's portfolio was divided in two after a Government reshuffle; he retained Health, but Meacher took Social Security. Cunningham took Shadow Leader of the House, being replaced by at Environment by Gould. Brown took the latter's Trade and Industry, being replaced himself by Margaret Beckett as Shadow Chief Secretary to the Treasury. Barry Jones returned to Wales portfolio, bumping Alan Williams from the front bench. Joan Lestor joined the Shadow Cabinet as Shadow Children's minister, and Ann Clwyd joined as Shadow Minister for International Development and Co-operation.

- Neil Kinnock – Leader of Her Majesty's Most Loyal Opposition and Leader of the Labour Party
- Roy Hattersley – Deputy Leader of the Labour Party and Shadow Home Secretary
- Gerald Kaufman – Shadow Foreign Secretary
- John Smith – Shadow Chancellor of the Exchequer
- Martin O'Neill – Shadow Secretary of State for Defence
- Gordon Brown – Shadow Secretary of State for Trade and Industry
- Frank Dobson – Shadow Secretary of State for Energy
- Jack Cunningham – Shadow Leader of the House of Commons and Campaign co-ordinator
- Robin Cook – Shadow Secretary of State for Health
- Michael Meacher – Shadow Secretary of State for Social Security
- Tony Blair – Shadow Secretary of State for Employment
- Jack Straw – Shadow Secretary of State for Education
- John Prescott – Shadow Secretary of State for Transport
- David Clark – Shadow Minister of Agriculture, Fisheries and Food
- Bryan Gould – Shadow Secretary of State for the Environment
- Margaret Beckett – Shadow Chief Secretary to the Treasury
- Donald Dewar – Shadow Secretary of State for Scotland
- Barry Jones – Shadow Secretary of State for Wales
- Kevin McNamara – Shadow Secretary of State for Northern Ireland
- Jo Richardson – Shadow Minister responsible for Women's Rights
- Joan Lestor – Shadow Minister for Children
- Ann Clwyd – Shadow Minister for International Development and co-operation
- John Morris – Shadow Attorney General and principal frontbench spokesman for Legal Affairs
- The Lord Elwyn-Jones – Shadow Lord Chancellor
- The Lord Cledwyn of Penrhos – Leader of the Opposition in the House of Lords
- Derek Foster – Opposition Chief Whip in the House of Commons
- The Lord Ponsonby of Shulbrede – Opposition Chief Whip in the House of Lords

=== Changes ===
- Lord Elwyn-Jones died on 4 December 1989, and he was replaced by Lord Mishcon.
- Lord Ponsonby died on 13 June 1990; he was replaced by Lord Graham of Edmonton.

== See also ==
- Second Thatcher ministry
- Third Thatcher ministry
- First Major ministry
- Smith shadow cabinet
