= List of MPs elected in the 1987 United Kingdom general election =

1987–1992 Parliament of the United Kingdom
←	1983–1987 Parliament	1992–1997 Parliament	→
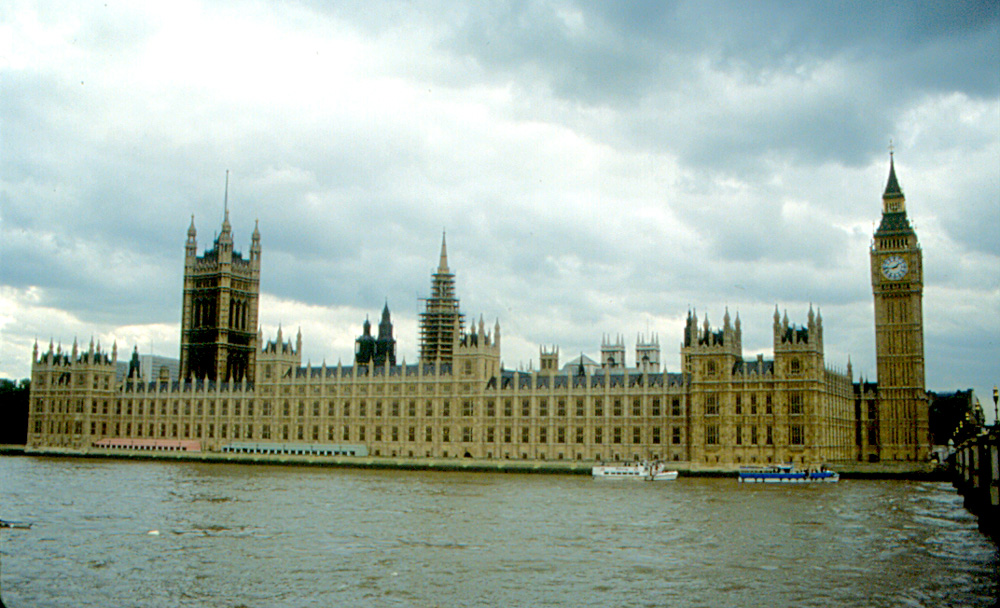
- Palace of Westminster in 1987

Overview
- Legislative body: Parliament of the United Kingdom
- Term: 11 June 1987 – 16 March 1992
- Election: 1987 United Kingdom general election
- Government: Third Thatcher ministry First Major ministry

House of Commons
- Members: 650
- Speaker: Bernard Weatherill
- Leader: John Wakeham; Geoffrey Howe; John MacGregor
- Prime Minister: Margaret Thatcher; John Major
- Leader of the Opposition: Neil Kinnock
- Third-party leader: David Steel & David Owen; Paddy Ashdown

House of Lords
- Lord Chancellor: Baron Havers; Baron Mackay of Clashfern

Crown-in-Parliament Elizabeth II

Sessions
- 1st: 17 June 1987 – 15 November 1988
- 2nd: 22 November 1988 – 16 November 1989
- 3rd: 21 November 1989 – 1 November 1990
- 4th: 7 November 1990 – 22 October 1991
- 5th: 31 October 1991 – 16 March 1992

This is a list of members of Parliament (MPs) elected in the 1987 general election, held on 11 June. The Parliament lasted until 1992, although the Prime Minister, Margaret Thatcher, was replaced on 28 November 1990 by Chancellor of the Exchequer, John Major.

Diane Abbott was one of the first three Black British MPs in the House of Commons; Bernie Grant and Paul Boateng were elected alongside her at the same election.

During the 1987–92 Parliament, Bernard Weatherill was the Speaker, Margaret Thatcher and John Major served as Prime Minister, and Neil Kinnock served as Leader of the Opposition. This Parliament was dissolved on 16 March 1992.

== Composition ==
These representative diagrams show the composition of the parties in the 1987 general election.

Note: The Scottish National Party and Plaid Cymru sit together as a party group, while Sinn Féin has not taken its seats. This is not the official seating plan of the House of Commons, which has five rows of benches on each side, with the government party to the right of the speaker and opposition parties to the left, but with room for only around two-thirds of MPs to sit at any one time.

Affiliation	Members
Conservative Party	376
Labour Party	229
SDP–Liberal Alliance	22 (5 + 17)
Ulster Unionist Party	9
Plaid Cymru	3
Social Democratic and Labour Party	3
Democratic Unionist Party	3
Scottish National Party	3
Sinn Féin	1
Ulster Popular Unionist Party	1
Total	650
Notional government majority	102
Effective government majority	110

Table of contents:

A B C D E F G H I J K L M N O P Q R S T U V W X Y Z By-elections

=== A ===
Constituency	MP	Party
Aberavon	John Morris	Labour
Aberdeen, North	Robert Hughes	Labour
Aberdeen, South	Frank Doran	Labour
Aldershot	Julian Critchley	Conservative
Aldridge-Brownhills	Richard Shepherd	Conservative
Altrincham and Sale	Sir Fergus Montgomery	Conservative
Alyn and Deeside	Barry Jones	Labour
Amber Valley	Phillip Oppenheim	Conservative
Angus East	Andrew Welsh	Scottish National Party
Antrim, East	Roy Beggs	Official Unionist
Antrim, North	Rev. Ian Paisley	Democratic Unionist
Antrim, South	Clifford Forsythe	Official Unionist
Argyll and Bute	Ray Michie	Liberal
Arundel	Michael Marshall	Conservative
Ashfield	Frank Haynes	Labour
Ashford	Keith Speed	Conservative
Ashton-under-Lyne	Robert Sheldon	Labour
Aylesbury	Timothy Raison	Conservative
Ayr	Hon. George Younger	Conservative
=== B ===
Banbury	Tony Baldry	Conservative
Banff and Buchan	Alex Salmond	Scottish National Party
Barking	Jo Richardson	Labour
Barnsley, Central	Eric Illsley	Labour
Barnsley, East	Terry Patchett	Labour
Barnsley, West and Penistone	Allen McKay	Labour
Barrow and Furness	Cecil Franks	Conservative
Basildon	David Amess	Conservative
Basingstoke	Andrew Hunter	Conservative
Bassetlaw	Joe Ashton	Labour
Bath	Chris Patten	Conservative
Batley and Spen	Elizabeth Peacock	Conservative
Battersea	John Bowis	Conservative
Beaconsfield	Tim Smith	Conservative
Beckenham	Sir Philip Goodhart	Conservative
Bedfordshire, Mid	Nicholas Lyell	Conservative
Bedfordshire, North	Sir Trevor Skeet	Conservative
Bedfordshire, South West	David Madel	Conservative
Belfast, East	Peter Robinson	Democratic Unionist
Belfast, North	Cecil Walker	Official Unionist
Belfast, South	Rev. Martin Smyth	Official Unionist
Belfast, West	Gerry Adams	Sinn Féin
Berkshire, East	Andrew MacKay	Conservative
Berwick-upon-Tweed	Alan Beith	Liberal
Bethnal Green and Stepney	Peter Shore	Labour
Beverley	James Cran	Conservative
Bexhill and Battle	Charles Wardle	Conservative
Bexleyheath	Cyril Townsend	Conservative
Billericay	Teresa Gorman	Conservative
Birkenhead	Frank Field	Labour
Birmingham, Edgbaston	Dame Jill Knight	Conservative
Birmingham, Erdington	Robin Corbett	Labour
Birmingham, Hall Green	Andrew Hargreaves	Conservative
Birmingham, Hodge Hill	Terence Davis	Labour
Birmingham, Ladywood	Clare Short	Labour
Birmingham, Northfield	Roger King	Conservative
Birmingham, Perry Barr	Jeff Rooker	Labour
Birmingham, Selly Oak	Anthony Beaumont-Dark	Conservative
Birmingham, Small Heath	Denis Howell	Labour
Birmingham, Sparkbrook	Roy Hattersley	Labour
Birmingham, Yardley	David Gilroy Bevan	Conservative
Bishop Auckland	Derek Foster	Labour
Blaby	Nigel Lawson	Conservative
Blackburn	Jack Straw	Labour
Blackpool, North	Norman Miscampbell	Conservative
Blackpool, South	Sir Peter Blaker	Conservative
Blaenau Gwent	Michael Foot	Labour
Blaydon	John McWilliam	Labour
Blyth Valley	Ronald Campbell	Labour
Bolsover	Dennis Skinner	Labour
Bolton, North East	Peter Thurnham	Conservative
Bolton, South East	David Young	Labour
Bolton, West	Hon. Tom Sackville	Conservative
Boothferry	David Davis	Conservative
Bootle	Allan Roberts	Labour
Bosworth	David Tredinnick	Conservative
Bournemouth, East	David Atkinson	Conservative
Bournemouth, West	John Butterfill	Conservative
Bow and Poplar	Mildred Gordon	Labour
Bradford, North	Pat Wall	Labour
Bradford, South	Robert Cryer	Labour
Bradford, West	Max Madden	Labour
Braintree	Anthony Newton	Conservative
Brecon and Radnor	Richard Livsey	Liberal
Brent, East	Ken Livingstone	Labour
Brent, North	Rhodes Boyson	Conservative
Brent, South	Paul Boateng	Labour
Brentford and Isleworth	Sir Barney Hayhoe	Conservative
Brentwood and Ongar	Robert McCrindle	Conservative
Bridgend	Win Griffiths	Labour
Bridgwater	Tom King	Conservative
Bridlington	John Townend	Conservative
Brigg and Cleethorpes	Michael Brown	Conservative
Brighton, Kemptown	Andrew Bowden	Conservative
Brighton, Pavilion	Julian Amery	Conservative
Bristol, East	Jonathan Sayeed	Conservative
Bristol, North West	Michael Stern	Conservative
Bristol, South	Dawn Primarolo	Labour
Bristol, West	Hon. William Waldegrave	Conservative
Bromsgrove	Hal Miller	Conservative
Broxbourne	Marion Roe	Conservative
Broxtowe	Jim Lester	Conservative
Buckingham	George Walden	Conservative
Burnley	Peter Pike	Labour
Burton	Ivan Lawrence	Conservative
Bury, North	Alistair Burt	Conservative
Bury, South	David Sumberg	Conservative
Bury St Edmunds	Sir Eldon Griffiths	Conservative
=== C ===
Caernarfon	Dafydd Wigley	Plaid Cymru
Caerphilly	Ron Davies	Labour
Caithness and Sutherland	Robert Maclennan	Social Democrat
Calder Valley	Donald Thompson	Conservative
Cambridge	Robert Rhodes James	Conservative
Cambridgeshire, North East	Malcolm Moss	Conservative
Cambridgeshire, South East	James Paice	Conservative
Cambridgeshire, South West	Sir Anthony Grant	Conservative
Cannock and Burntwood	Gerald Howarth	Conservative
Canterbury	Julian Brazier	Conservative
Cardiff, Central	Ian Grist	Conservative
Cardiff, North	Gwilym Jones	Conservative
Cardiff, South and Penarth	Alun Michael	Labour Co-operative
Cardiff, West	Rhodri Morgan	Labour
Carlisle	Eric Martlew	Labour
Carmarthen	Alan Williams	Labour
Carrick, Cumnock and Doon Valley	George Foulkes	Labour Co-operative
Carshalton and Wallington	Nigel Forman	Conservative
Castle Point	Sir Bernard Braine	Conservative
Ceredigion and Pembroke North	Geraint Howells	Liberal
Cheadle	Stephen Day	Conservative
Chelmsford	Simon Burns	Conservative
Chelsea	Nicholas Scott	Conservative
Cheltenham	Charles Irving	Conservative
Chertsey and Walton	Geoffrey Pattie	Conservative
Chesham and Amersham	Sir Ian Gilmour	Conservative
Chesterfield	Tony Benn	Labour
Chichester	Anthony Nelson	Conservative
Chingford	Norman Tebbit	Conservative
Chipping Barnet	Sydney Chapman	Conservative
Chislehurst	Roger Sims	Conservative
Chorley	Den Dover	Conservative
Christchurch	Robert Adley	Conservative
Cirencester and Tewkesbury	Hon. Nicholas Ridley	Conservative
City of Chester	Hon. Peter Morrison	Conservative
City of London and Westminster South	Hon. Peter Brooke	Conservative
Clackmannan	Martin O'Neill	Labour
Clwyd, North West	Sir Anthony Meyer	Conservative
Clwyd, South West	Martyn Jones	Labour
Clydebank and Milngavie	Tony Worthington	Labour
Clydesdale	Jimmy Hood	Labour
Colchester, North	Sir Antony Buck	Conservative
Colchester, South and Maldon	John Wakeham	Conservative
Colne Valley	Graham Riddick	Conservative
Congleton	Ann Winterton	Conservative
Conwy	Wyn Roberts	Conservative
Copeland	John Cunningham	Labour
Corby	William Powell	Conservative
Cornwall, North	Gerry Neale	Conservative
Cornwall, South East	Robert Hicks	Conservative
Coventry, North East	John Hughes	Labour
Coventry, North West	Geoffrey Robinson	Labour
Coventry, South East	David Nellist	Labour
Coventry, South West	John Butcher	Conservative
Crawley	Hon. Nicholas Soames	Conservative
Crewe and Nantwich	Gwyneth Dunwoody	Labour
Crosby	Malcolm Thornton	Conservative
Croydon, Central	John Moore	Conservative
Croydon, North East	Bernard Weatherill	Conservative
Croydon, North West	Humfrey Malins	Conservative
Croydon, South	Sir William Clark	Conservative
Cumbernauld and Kilsyth	Norman Hogg	Labour
Cunninghame, North	Brian Wilson	Labour
Cunninghame, South	David Lambie	Labour
Cynon Valley	Ann Clwyd	Labour
=== D ===
Dagenham	Bryan Gould	Labour
Darlington	Michael Fallon	Conservative
Dartford	Bob Dunn	Conservative
Daventry	Tim Boswell	Conservative
Davyhulme	Winston Churchill	Conservative
Delyn	Keith Raffan	Conservative
Denton and Reddish	Andrew Bennett	Labour
Derby, North	Gregory Knight	Conservative
Derby, South	Margaret Beckett	Labour
Derbyshire, North East	Harry Barnes	Labour
Derbyshire, South	Edwina Currie	Conservative
Derbyshire, West	Patrick McLoughlin	Conservative
Devizes	Hon. Charles Morrison	Conservative
Devon, North	Tony Speller	Conservative
Devon, West and Torridge	Emma Nicholson	Conservative
Dewsbury	Ann Taylor	Labour
Doncaster, Central	Harold Walker	Labour
Doncaster, North	Michael Welsh	Labour
Don Valley	Martin Redmond	Labour
Dorset, North	Nicholas Baker	Conservative
Dorset, South	Ian Bruce	Conservative
Dorset, West	Jim Spicer	Conservative
Dover	David Shaw	Conservative
Down, North	James Kilfedder	Ulster Popular Unionist
Down, South	Eddie McGrady	Social Democratic and Labour
Dudley, East	John Gilbert	Labour
Dudley, West	John Blackburn	Conservative
Dulwich	Gerald Bowden	Conservative
Dumbarton	John McFall	Labour Co-operative
Dumfries	Sir Hector Monro	Conservative
Dundee, East	John McAllion	Labour
Dundee, West	Ernie Ross	Labour
Dunfermline, East	Gordon Brown	Labour
Dunfermline, West	Richard Douglas	Labour Co-operative
Durham, City of	Dr. Gerry Steinberg	Labour
Durham, North	Giles Radice	Labour
Durham, North West	Hilary Armstrong	Labour
=== E ===
Ealing, Acton	Sir George Young, 6th Baronet	Conservative
Ealing, North	Harry Greenway	Conservative
Ealing, Southall	Syd Bidwell	Labour
Easington	John Cummings	Labour
Eastbourne	Ian Gow	Conservative
East Kilbride	Adam Ingram	Labour
Eastleigh	Sir David Price	Conservative
East Lindsey	Sir Peter Tapsell	Conservative
East Lothian	John Home Robertson	Labour
Eastwood	Allan Stewart	Conservative
Eccles	Joan Lestor	Labour
Eddisbury	Alastair Goodlad	Conservative
Edinburgh Central	Alistair Darling	Labour
Edinburgh East	Gavin Strang	Labour
Edinburgh Leith	Ronald Brown	Labour
Edinburgh Pentlands	Malcolm Rifkind	Conservative
Edinburgh South	Nigel Griffiths	Labour
Edinburgh West	The Lord James Douglas-Hamilton	Conservative
Edmonton	Ian Twinn	Conservative
Ellesmere Port and Neston	Mike Woodcock	Conservative
Elmet	Spencer Batiste	Conservative
Eltham	Peter Bottomley	Conservative
Enfield, North	Tim Eggar	Conservative
Enfield, Southgate	Michael Portillo	Conservative
Epping Forest	Sir John Biggs-Davison	Conservative
Epsom & Ewell	Hon. Archie Hamilton	Conservative
Erewash	Peter Rost	Conservative
Erith and Crayford	David Evennett	Conservative
Esher	Ian Taylor	Conservative
Exeter	John Hannam	Conservative
=== F ===
Falkirk, East	Harry Ewing	Labour
Falkirk, West	Dennis Canavan	Labour
Falmouth and Camborne	David Mudd	Conservative
Fareham	Peter Lloyd	Conservative
Faversham	Roger Moate	Conservative
Feltham and Heston	Patrick Ground	Conservative
Fermanagh & South Tyrone	Kenneth Maginnis	Official Unionist
Fife, Central	Henry McLeish	Labour
Fife, North East	Menzies Campbell	Liberal
Finchley	Margaret Thatcher	Conservative
Folkestone and Hythe	Michael Howard	Conservative
Foyle	John Hume	Social Democratic and Labour
Fulham	Matthew Carrington	Conservative
Fylde	Michael Jack	Conservative
=== G ===
Gainsborough and Horncastle	Edward Leigh	Conservative
Galloway and Upper Nithsdale	Ian Lang	Conservative
Gateshead, East	Joyce Quin	Labour
Gedling	Andrew Mitchell	Conservative
Gillingham	James Couchman	Conservative
Glanford and Scunthorpe	Elliot Morley	Labour
Glasgow, Cathcart	John Maxton	Labour
Glasgow, Central	Bob McTaggart	Labour
Glasgow, Garscadden	Donald Dewar	Labour
Glasgow, Govan	Bruce Millan	Labour
Glasgow, Hillhead	George Galloway	Labour
Glasgow, Maryhill	Maria Fyfe	Labour
Glasgow, Pollok	Jimmy Dunnachie	Labour
Glasgow, Provan	James Wray	Labour
Glasgow, Rutherglen	Thomas McAvoy	Labour Co-operative
Glasgow, Shettleston	David Marshall	Labour
Glasgow, Springburn	Michael Martin	Labour
Gloucester	Douglas French	Conservative
Gloucestershire, West	Paul Marland	Conservative
Gordon	Malcolm Bruce	Liberal
Gosport	Peter Viggers	Conservative
Gower	Gareth Wardell	Labour
Grantham	Hon. Douglas Hogg	Conservative
Gravesham	Jacques Arnold	Conservative
Great Grimsby	Austin Mitchell	Labour
Great Yarmouth	Michael Carttiss	Conservative
Greenock and Port Glasgow	Norman Godman	Labour
Greenwich	Rosie Barnes	Social Democrat
Guildford	David Howell	Conservative
=== H ===
Hackney, North and Stoke Newington	Diane Abbott	Labour
Hackney, South and Shoreditch	Brian Sedgemore	Labour
Halesowen and Stourbridge	John Stokes	Conservative
Halifax	Alice Mahon	Labour
Halton	Gordon Oakes	Labour
Hamilton	George Robertson	Labour
Hammersmith	Clive Soley	Labour
Hampshire, East	Michael Mates	Conservative
Hampshire, North West	David Mitchell	Conservative
Hampstead and Highgate	Sir Geoffrey Finsberg	Conservative
Harborough	Sir John Farr	Conservative
Harlow	Jeremy Hayes	Conservative
Harrogate	Robert Banks	Conservative
Harrow, East	Hugh Dykes	Conservative
Harrow, West	Robert Hughes	Conservative
Hartlepool	Ted Leadbitter	Labour
Harwich	Sir Julian Ridsdale	Conservative
Hastings and Rye	Kenneth Warren	Conservative
Havant	Sir Ian Lloyd	Conservative
Hayes and Harlington	Terry Dicks	Conservative
Hazel Grove	Tom Arnold	Conservative
Hemsworth	George Buckley	Labour
Hendon, North	John Gorst	Conservative
Hendon, South	John Marshall	Conservative
Henley	Michael Heseltine	Conservative
Hereford	Colin Shepherd	Conservative
Hertford and Stortford	Bowen Wells	Conservative
Hertfordshire, North	Ian Stewart	Conservative
Hertfordshire, South West	Richard Page	Conservative
Hertfordshire, West	Robert Jones	Conservative
Hertsmere	Cecil Parkinson	Conservative
Hexham	Alan Amos	Conservative
Heywood and Middleton	James Callaghan	Labour
High Peak	Christopher Hawkins	Conservative
Holborn and St Pancras	Frank Dobson	Labour
Holland with Boston	Sir Richard Body	Conservative
Honiton	Sir Peter Emery	Conservative
Hornchurch	Robin Squire	Conservative
Hornsey and Wood Green	Sir Hugh Rossi	Conservative
Horsham	Sir Peter Hordern	Conservative
Houghton and Washington	Roland Boyes	Labour
Hove	Hon. Tim Sainsbury	Conservative
Huddersfield	Barry Sheerman	Labour Co-operative
Huntingdon	John Major	Conservative
Hyndburn	Ken Hargreaves	Conservative
=== I ===
Ilford, North	Vivian Bendall	Conservative
Ilford, South	Neil Thorne	Conservative
Inverness, Nairn and Lochaber	Sir Russell Johnston	Liberal
Ipswich	Michael Irvine	Conservative
Isle of Wight	Barry Field	Conservative
Islington, North	Jeremy Corbyn	Labour
Islington, South and Finsbury	Chris Smith	Labour
Islwyn	Neil Kinnock	Labour
=== J ===
Jarrow	Donald Dixon	Labour
=== K ===
Keighley	Gary Waller	Conservative
Kensington	Sir Brandon Rhys-Williams	Conservative
Kent, Mid	Andrew Rowe	Conservative
Kettering	Roger Freeman	Conservative
Kilmarnock and Loudoun	William McKelvey	Labour
Kincardine and Deeside	Alick Buchanan-Smith	Conservative
Kingston upon Hull East	John Prescott	Labour
Kingston upon Hull North	Kevin McNamara	Labour
Kingston upon Hull West	Stuart Randall	Labour
Kingston upon Thames	Norman Lamont	Conservative
Kingswood	Robert Hayward	Conservative
Kirkcaldy	Dr. Lewis Moonie	Labour Co-operative
Knowsley, North	George Howarth	Labour
Knowsley, South	Sean Hughes	Labour
=== L ===
Lagan Valley	James Molyneaux	Official Unionist
Lancashire, West	Kenneth Hind	Conservative
Lancaster	Elaine Kellett-Bowman	Conservative
Langbaurgh	Richard Holt	Conservative
Leeds, Central	Derek Fatchett	Labour
Leeds, East	Denis Healey	Labour
Leeds, North East	Timothy Kirkhope	Conservative
Leeds, North West	Keith Hampson	Conservative
Leeds South and Morley	Merlyn Rees	Labour
Leeds, West	John Battle	Labour
Leicester, East	Keith Vaz	Labour
Leicester South	Jim Marshall	Labour
Leicester, West	Greville Janner	Labour
Leicestershire, North West	David Ashby	Conservative
Leigh	Lawrence Cunliffe	Labour
Leominster	Peter Temple-Morris	Conservative
Lewes	Tim Rathbone	Conservative
Lewisham Deptford	Joan Ruddock	Labour
Lewisham, East	Hon. Colin Moynihan	Conservative
Lewisham, West	John Maples	Conservative
Leyton	Harry Cohen	Labour
Lincoln	Kenneth Carlisle	Conservative
Linlithgow	Tam Dalyell	Labour
Littleborough and Saddleworth	Geoffrey Dickens	Conservative
Liverpool, Broadgreen	Terence Fields	Labour
Liverpool, Garston	Eddie Loyden	Labour
Liverpool, Mossley Hill	David Alton	Liberal
Liverpool, Riverside	Robert Parry	Labour
Liverpool, Walton	Eric Heffer	Labour
Liverpool, West Derby	Robert Wareing	Labour
Livingston	Robin Cook	Labour
Llanelli	Denzil Davies	Labour
Londonderry, East	William Ross	Official Unionist
Loughborough	Stephen Dorrell	Conservative
Ludlow	Christopher Gill	Conservative
Luton, North	John Carlisle	Conservative
Luton, South	Graham Bright	Conservative
=== M ===
Macclesfield	Nick Winterton	Conservative
Maidstone	Ann Widdecombe	Conservative
Makerfield	Ian McCartney	Labour
Manchester, Blackley	Kenneth Eastham	Labour
Manchester, Central	Robert Litherland	Labour
Manchester, Gorton	Gerald Kaufman	Labour
Manchester, Withington	Keith Bradley	Labour
Manchester, Wythenshawe	Alfred Morris	Labour Co-operative
Mansfield	Alan Meale	Labour
Medway	Dame Peggy Fenner	Conservative
Meirionnydd Nant Conwy	Dafydd Elis-Thomas	Plaid Cymru
Meriden	Iain Mills	Conservative
Merthyr Tydfil and Rhymney	Ted Rowlands	Labour
Middlesbrough	Stuart Bell	Labour
Midlothian	Alexander Eadie	Labour
Milton Keynes	William Benyon	Conservative
Mitcham and Morden	Angela Rumbold	Conservative
Mole Valley	Kenneth Baker	Conservative
Monklands, East	John Smith	Labour
Monklands, West	Tom Clarke	Labour
Monmouth	Sir John Stradling Thomas	Conservative
Montgomery	Alex Carlile	Liberal
Moray	Margaret Ewing	Scottish National Party
Morecambe and Lunesdale	Hon. Mark Lennox-Boyd	Conservative
Motherwell, North	John Reid	Labour
Motherwell, South	Jeremy Bray	Labour
=== N ===
Neath	Donald Coleman	Labour
Newark	Richard Alexander	Conservative
Newbury	Michael McNair-Wilson	Conservative
Newcastle-under-Lyme	Llin Golding	Labour
Newcastle upon Tyne, Central	Jim Cousins	Labour
Newcastle upon Tyne, East	Nicholas Brown	Labour
Newcastle upon Tyne, North	Doug Henderson	Labour
New Forest	Patrick McNair-Wilson	Conservative
Newham, North East	Ronald Leighton	Labour
Newham, North West	Tony Banks	Labour
Newham, South	Nigel Spearing	Labour
Newport, East	Roy Hughes	Labour
Newport, West	Paul Flynn	Labour
Newry & Armagh	Seamus Mallon	Social Democratic and Labour
Norfolk, Mid	Richard Ryder	Conservative
Norfolk North	Ralph Howell	Conservative
Norfolk, North West	Henry Bellingham	Conservative
Norfolk, South	John MacGregor	Conservative
Norfolk, South West	Gillian Shephard	Conservative
Normanton	Bill O'Brien	Labour
Northampton, North	Tony Marlow	Conservative
Northampton, South	Michael Morris	Conservative
Northavon	John Cope	Conservative
Norwich, North	Patrick Thompson	Conservative
Norwich, South	John Garrett	Labour
Norwood	John Fraser	Labour
Nottingham, East	Michael Knowles	Conservative
Nottingham, North	Graham Allen	Labour
Nottingham, South	Martin Brandon-Bravo	Conservative
Nuneaton	Lewis Stevens	Conservative
=== O ===
Ogmore	Raymond Powell	Labour
Old Bexley and Sidcup	Sir Edward Heath	Conservative
Oldham, Central and Royton	James Lamond	Labour
Oldham, West	Michael Meacher	Labour
Orkney and Shetland	Jim Wallace	Liberal
Orpington	Ivor Stanbrook	Conservative
Oxford, East	Andrew Smith	Labour
Oxford, West and Abingdon	John Patten	Conservative
=== P ===
Paisley, North	Allen Adams	Labour
Paisley, South	Norman Buchan	Labour
Peckham	Harriet Harman	Labour
Pembrokeshire	Nicholas Bennett	Conservative
Pendle	John Lee	Conservative
Penrith and The Border	David Maclean	Conservative
Perth and Kinross	Nicholas Fairbairn	Conservative
Peterborough	Dr. Brian Mawhinney	Conservative
Plymouth, Devonport	Dr. David Owen	Social Democrat
Plymouth, Drake	Janet Fookes	Conservative
Plymouth, Sutton	Alan Clark	Conservative
Pontefract and Castleford	Geoffrey Lofthouse	Labour
Pontypridd	Brynmor John	Labour
Poole	John Ward	Conservative
Portsmouth, North	Peter Griffiths	Conservative
Portsmouth, South	David Martin	Conservative
Preston	Audrey Wise	Labour
Pudsey	Giles Shaw	Conservative
Putney	David Mellor	Conservative
=== R ===
Ravensbourne	John Hunt	Conservative
Reading, East	Sir Gerard Vaughan	Conservative
Reading, West	Anthony Durant	Conservative
Redcar	Marjorie Mowlam	Labour
Reigate	George Gardiner	Conservative
Renfrew, West and Inverclyde	Thomas Graham	Labour
Rhondda	Allan Rogers	Labour
Ribble Valley	David Waddington	Conservative
Richmond and Barnes	Jeremy Hanley	Conservative
Richmond (Yorkshire)	Leon Brittan	Conservative
Rochdale	Cyril Smith	Liberal
Rochford	Dr. Michael Clark	Conservative
Romford	Michael Neubert	Conservative
Romsey and Waterside	Michael Colvin	Conservative
Ross, Cromarty and Skye	Charles Kennedy	Social Democrat
Rossendale and Darwen	David Trippier	Conservative
Rotherham	Stanley Crowther	Labour
Rother Valley	Kevin Barron	Labour
Roxburgh and Berwickshire	Archy Kirkwood	Liberal
Rugby and Kenilworth	Jim Pawsey	Conservative
Ruislip-Northwood	John Wilkinson	Conservative
Rushcliffe	Kenneth Clarke	Conservative
Rutland and Melton	Michael Latham	Conservative
Ryedale	John Greenway	Conservative
=== S ===
Saffron Walden	Alan Haselhurst	Conservative
St Albans	Peter Lilley	Conservative
St Helens, North	John Evans	Labour
St Helens, South	Gerald Bermingham	Labour
St Ives	David Harris	Conservative
Salford East	Stanley Orme	Labour
Salisbury	Robert Key	Conservative
Scarborough	Sir Michael Shaw	Conservative
Sedgefield	Tony Blair	Labour
Selby	Michael Alison	Conservative
Sevenoaks	Mark Wolfson	Conservative
Sheffield Attercliffe	Patrick Duffy	Labour
Sheffield Brightside	David Blunkett	Labour
Sheffield Central	Richard Caborn	Labour
Sheffield Hallam	Irvine Patnick	Conservative
Sheffield Heeley	Bill Michie	Labour
Sheffield Hillsborough	Martin Flannery	Labour
Sherwood	Andrew Stewart	Conservative
Shipley	Sir Marcus Fox	Conservative
Shoreham	Richard Luce	Conservative
Shrewsbury and Atcham	Derek Conway	Conservative
Shropshire, North	John Biffen	Conservative
Skipton and Ripon	David Curry	Conservative
Slough	John Watts	Conservative
Solihull	John Taylor	Conservative
Somerton and Frome	Hon. Robert Boscawen	Conservative
Southampton, Itchen	Christopher Chope	Conservative
Southampton, Test	James Hill	Conservative
Southend, East	Teddy Taylor	Conservative
Southend, West	Paul Channon	Conservative
South Hams	Anthony Steen	Conservative
Southport	Ronald Fearn	Liberal
South Ribble	Robert Atkins	Conservative
South Shields	David G. Clark	Labour
Southwark and Bermondsey	Simon Hughes	Liberal
Spelthorne	David Wilshire	Conservative
Stafford	William Cash	Conservative
Staffordshire, Mid	John Heddle	Conservative
Staffordshire, Moorlands	David Knox	Conservative
Staffordshire, South	Patrick Cormack	Conservative
Staffordshire, South East	David Lightbown	Conservative
Stalybridge and Hyde	Tom Pendry	Labour
Stamford and Spalding	Quentin Davies	Conservative
Stevenage	Timothy Wood	Conservative
Stirling	Michael Forsyth	Conservative
Stockport	Anthony Favell	Conservative
Stockton, North	Frank Cook	Labour
Stockton, South	Tim Devlin	Conservative
Stoke-on-Trent, Central	Mark Fisher	Labour
Stoke-on-Trent, North	Joan Walley	Labour
Stoke-on-Trent, South	Jack Ashley	Labour
Strangford	John Taylor	Official Unionist
Stratford-on-Avon	Alan Howarth	Conservative
Strathkelvin and Bearsden	Sam Galbraith	Labour
Streatham	William Shelton	Conservative
Stretford	Tony Lloyd	Labour
Stroud	Roger Knapman	Conservative
Suffolk, Central	Michael Lord	Conservative
Suffolk, Coastal	John Gummer	Conservative
Suffolk, South	Tim Yeo	Conservative
Sunderland, North	Bob Clay	Labour
Sunderland, South	Chris Mullin	Labour
Surbiton	Richard Tracey	Conservative
Surrey, East	Sir Geoffrey Howe	Conservative
Surrey, North West	Michael Grylls	Conservative
Surrey, South West	Virginia Bottomley	Conservative
Sussex, Mid	Tim Renton	Conservative
Sutton and Cheam	Neil Macfarlane	Conservative
Sutton Coldfield	Norman Fowler	Conservative
Swansea, East	Donald Anderson	Labour
Swansea, West	Alan J. Williams	Labour
Swindon	Simon Coombs	Conservative
=== T ===
Tatton	Neil Hamilton	Conservative
Taunton	David Nicholson	Conservative
Tayside, North	Bill Walker	Conservative
Teignbridge	Patrick Nicholls	Conservative
Thanet, North	Roger Gale	Conservative
Thanet, South	Jonathan Aitken	Conservative
Thurrock	Tim Janman	Conservative
Tiverton	Robin Maxwell-Hyslop	Conservative
Tonbridge and Malling	John Stanley	Conservative
Tooting	Tom Cox	Labour
Torbay	Rupert Allason	Conservative
Torfaen	Paul Murphy	Labour
Tottenham	Bernie Grant	Labour
Truro	Matthew Taylor	Liberal
Tunbridge Wells	Sir Patrick Mayhew	Conservative
Tweeddale, Ettrick and Lauderdale	David Steel	Liberal
Twickenham	Toby Jessel	Conservative
Tyne Bridge	David Clelland	Labour
Tynemouth	Neville Trotter	Conservative
=== U ===
Mid Ulster	Rev. William McCrea	Democratic Unionist
Upminster	Sir Nicholas Bonsor	Conservative
Upper Bann	Harold McCusker	Official Unionist
Uxbridge	Michael Shersby	Conservative
=== V ===
Vale of Glamorgan	Sir Raymond Gower	Conservative
Vauxhall	Stuart Holland	Labour
=== W ===
Wakefield	David Hinchliffe	Labour
Wallasey	Lynda Chalker	Conservative
Wallsend	Ted Garrett	Labour
Walsall, North	David Winnick	Labour
Walsall, South	Bruce George	Labour
Walthamstow	Hugo Summerson	Conservative
Wansbeck	John Thompson	Labour
Wansdyke	Jack Aspinwall	Conservative
Wanstead and Woodford	James Arbuthnot	Conservative
Wantage	Robert V. Jackson	Conservative
Warley, East	Andrew Faulds	Labour
Warley, West	Peter Archer	Labour
Warrington, North	Doug Hoyle	Labour
Warrington, South	Chris Butler	Conservative
Warwick and Leamington	Sir Dudley Smith	Conservative
Warwickshire, North	Hon. Francis Maude	Conservative
Watford	Tristan Garel-Jones	Conservative
Waveney	David Porter	Conservative
Wealden	Sir Geoffrey Johnson Smith	Conservative
Wellingborough	Peter Fry	Conservative
Wells	David Heathcoat-Amory	Conservative
Welwyn Hatfield	David Evans	Conservative
Wentworth	Peter Hardy	Labour
West Bromwich, East	Peter Snape	Labour
West Bromwich, West	Betty Boothroyd	Labour
Westbury	Dennis Walters	Conservative
Western Isles	Calum MacDonald	Labour
Westminster, North	John Wheeler	Conservative
Westmorland and Lonsdale	Michael Jopling	Conservative
Weston-super-Mare	Jerry Wiggin	Conservative
Wigan	Roger Stott	Labour
Wiltshire, North	Richard Needham	Conservative
Wimbledon	Dr. Charles Goodson-Wickes	Conservative
Winchester	John Browne	Conservative
Windsor and Maidenhead	Dr. Alan Glyn	Conservative
Wirral, South	Barry Porter	Conservative
Wirral, West	David Hunt	Conservative
Witney	Hon. Douglas Hurd	Conservative
Woking	Cranley Onslow	Conservative
Wokingham	John Redwood	Conservative
Wolverhampton, North East	Maureen Hicks	Conservative
Wolverhampton, South East	Dennis Turner	Labour Co-operative
Wolverhampton, South West	Nicholas Budgen	Conservative
Woodspring	Sir Paul Dean	Conservative
Woolwich	John Cartwright	Social Democrat
Worcester	Peter Walker	Conservative
Worcestershire, Mid	Eric Forth	Conservative
Worcestershire, South	Michael Spicer	Conservative
Workington	Dale Campbell-Savours	Labour
Worsley	Terry Lewis	Labour
Worthing	Terence Higgins	Conservative
Wrekin, The	Bruce Grocott	Labour
Wrexham	John Marek	Labour
Wycombe	Ray Whitney	Conservative
Wyre	Keith Mans	Conservative
Wyre Forest	Anthony Coombs	Conservative
=== Y ===
Yeovil	Paddy Ashdown	Liberal
Ynys Môn	Ieuan Wyn Jones	Plaid Cymru
York	Conal Gregory	Conservative

== By-elections ==
See the List of United Kingdom by-elections (1979–2010).
