= 1985 Labour Party Shadow Cabinet election =

UK political party election

The results of elections to the Labour Party's Shadow Cabinet (more formally, its "Parliamentary Committee") were announced on 30 October 1985. In addition to the 15 members elected, the Leader (Neil Kinnock), Deputy Leader (Roy Hattersley), Labour Chief Whip (Derek Foster), Labour Leader in the House of Lords (Cledwyn Hughes), and Chairman of the Parliamentary Labour Party (Jack Dormand) were automatically members.

As a result of the election, Gwyneth Dunwoody lost her place in the cabinet. Hughes and Dobson tied for 15th place, so a run-off election was conducted, in which Hughes beat Dobson by 102 votes to 75.

Rank	Prior rank	Candidate	Constituency	Votes
1	1	Gerald Kaufman	Manchester Gorton	122
2	3=	Stan Orme	Salford East	115
3=	2	Denis Healey	Leeds East	112
3=	8=	John Prescott	Kingston upon Hull East	112
5	15	Robin Cook	Livingston	106
6	6	Peter Shore	Bethnal Green and Stepney	100
7	5	John Smith	Monklands East	99
8	12=	Giles Radice	North Durham	98
9	3=	Jack Cunningham	Copeland	95
10=	7	Peter Archer	Warley West	94
10=	8=	Barry Jones	Alyn and Deeside	94
12	11	Michael Meacher	Oldham West	93
13	12=	Denzil Davies	Llanelli	90
14	14	Donald Dewar	Glasgow Garscadden	88
15=		Robert Hughes	Aberdeen North	87
15=		Frank Dobson	Holborn and St Pancras	87
17		David Clark	South Shields	80
18		Brynmor John	Pontypridd	76
19		Jo Richardson	Barking	71
20=		Tam Dalyell	Linlithgow	70
20=	10	Gwyneth Dunwoody	Crewe and Nantwich	70
20=		Gavin Strang	Edinburgh East	70
23		Tony Benn	Chesterfield	63

== Footnotes ==
Notes
