= List of 1998 British incumbents =

This is a list of 1998 British incumbents.

== Government ==
- Monarch
  - Head of State - Elizabeth II, Queen of the United Kingdom (1952–2022)
- Prime Minister
  - Head of Government - Tony Blair, Prime Minister of the United Kingdom (1997–2007)
- Deputy Prime Minister
  - Deputy Head of Government - John Prescott, Deputy Prime Minister of the United Kingdom (1997–2007)
- First Secretary of State
  - John Prescott, First Secretary of State (1997–2007)
- First Lord of the Treasury
  - Tony Blair, First Lord of the Treasury (1997–2007)
- Minister for the Civil Service
  - Tony Blair, Minister for the Civil Service (1997–2007)
- Chancellor of the Exchequer
  - Gordon Brown, Chancellor of the Exchequer (1997–2007)
- Second Lord of the Treasury
  - Gordon Brown, Second Lord of the Treasury (1997–2007)
- Secretary of State for Foreign and Commonwealth Affairs
  - Robin Cook, Secretary of State for Foreign and Commonwealth Affairs (1997–2001)
- Secretary of State for the Home Department
  - Jack Straw, Secretary of State for the Home Department (1997–2001)
- Minister of Agriculture, Fisheries and Food
  1. Jack Cunningham, Minister of Agriculture, Fisheries and Food (1997–1998)
  2. Nick Brown, Minister of Agriculture, Fisheries and Food (1998–2001)
- Secretary of State for Environment, Transport and the Regions
  1. Gavin Strang, Secretary of State for Environment, Transport and the Regions (1997–1998)
  2. John Reid, Secretary of State for Environment, Transport and the Regions (1998–1999)
- Secretary of State for Scotland
  - Donald Dewar, Secretary of State for Scotland (1997–1999)
- Secretary of State for Health
  - Frank Dobson, Secretary of State for Health (1997–1999)
- Secretary of State for Northern Ireland
  - Mo Mowlam, Secretary of State for Northern Ireland (1997–1999)
- Secretary of State for Defence
  - Lord Robertson of Port Ellen, Secretary of State for Defence (1997–1999)
- Secretary of State for Trade and Industry
  1. Margaret Beckett, Secretary of State for Trade and Industry (1997–1998)
  2. Peter Mandelson, Secretary of State for Trade and Industry (1998)
  3. Stephen Byers, Secretary of State for Trade and Industry (1998–2001)
- Minister for Women and Equality
  - Patricia Hewitt, Minister for Women and Equality (2001–2007)
- Secretary of State for Culture, Media and Sport
  - Chris Smith, Secretary of State for Culture, Media and Sport (1997–2001)
- Secretary of State for Education and Employment
  - David Blunkett, Secretary of State for Education and Employment (1997–2001)
- Secretary of State for Wales
  1. Ron Davies, Secretary of State for Wales (1997–1998)
  2. Alun Michael, Secretary of State for Wales (1998–1999)
- Lord Privy Seal
  1. Lord Richard, Lord Privy Seal (1997–1998)
  2. Margaret Jay, Baroness Jay of Paddington, Lord Privy Seal (1998–2001)
- Leader of the House of Commons
  1. Ann Taylor, Baroness Taylor of Bolton, Leader of the House of Commons (1997–1998)
  2. Margaret Beckett, Leader of the House of Commons (1998–2001)
- Lord President of the Council
  1. Ann Taylor, Baroness Taylor of Bolton, Lord President of the Council (1997–1998)
  2. Margaret Beckett, Lord President of the Council (1998–2001)
- Lord Chancellor
  - Derry Irvine, Baron Irvine of Lairg, Lord Chancellor (1997–2003)
- Secretary of State for International Development
  - Clare Short, Secretary of State for International Development (1997–2003)
- Secretary of State for Social Security
  1. Harriet Harman, Secretary of State for Social Security (1997–1998)
  2. Alistair Darling, Secretary of State for Social Security (1998–2001)
- Chancellor of the Duchy of Lancaster
  1. David G. Clark, Chancellor of the Duchy of Lancaster (1997–1998)
  2. Jack Cunningham, Chancellor of the Duchy of Lancaster (1998–1999)

== Religion ==
- Archbishop of Canterbury
  - George Carey, Archbishop of Canterbury (1991–2002)
- Archbishop of York
  - David Hope, Archbishop of York (1995–2005)
