= 1986 Labour Party Shadow Cabinet election =

British political party election

The annual election to the Labour Party's Shadow Cabinet (more formally, its "Parliamentary Committee") was conducted in October 1986. In addition to the 16 members elected, the Leader (Neil Kinnock), Deputy Leader (Roy Hattersley), Labour Chief Whip (Derek Foster), Labour Leader in the House of Lords (Cledwyn Hughes), and Chairman of the Parliamentary Labour Party (Jack Dormand) were automatically members.

As a result of the election, David Clark and Bryan Gould joined the cabinet, while Robin Cook and Robert Hughes lost their places.

Rank	Prior rank	Candidate	Constituency	Votes
1	1	Gerald Kaufman	Manchester Gorton	113
2	7	John Smith	Monklands East	103
3	13	Denzil Davies	Llanelli	102
4=	3=	Denis Healey	Leeds East	100
4=	2	Stan Orme	Salford East	100
6	10=	Barry Jones	Alyn and Deeside	96
7	6	Peter Shore	Bethnal Green and Stepney	94
8	9	Jack Cunningham	Copeland	93
9	10=	Peter Archer	Warley West	92
10	8	Giles Radice	North Durham	91
12=	17	David Clark	South Shields	89
12=	3=	John Prescott	Kingston upon Hull East	89
14	14	Donald Dewar	Glasgow Garscadden	88
15		Bryan Gould	Dagenham	82
16	12	Michael Meacher	Oldham West	80
17=	5	Robin Cook	Livingston	78
17=	15=	Robert Hughes	Aberdeen North	78
19	18	Brynmor John	Pontypridd	73

Top 19 candidates are listed.

== Footnotes ==
Notes
