= 1989 Labour Party Shadow Cabinet election =

Interparty election

Elections to the Labour Party's Shadow Cabinet (more formally, its "Parliamentary Committee") occurred in November 1989. For these elections the Shadow Cabinet was expanded from 15 to 18 seats and, for the first time, MPs had to cast at least three votes for women.

In July 1989 Labour agreed to increase the number of places on the Shadow Cabinet and introduce positive discrimination to ensure more women were included. After considering several options for increasing the number of women in the Shadow Cabinet, the party voted for Llin Golding's proposal to require all MPs to cast at least three votes for women. As a result of these changes, the Shadow Cabinet elected in 1989 included four women for the first time.

In addition to the 18 members elected, the Leader (Neil Kinnock), Deputy Leader (Roy Hattersley), Labour Chief Whip (Derek Foster), Labour Leader in the House of Lords (Cledwyn Hughes), Chief Whip in the House of Lords (Thomas Ponsonby), House of Lords Shadow Cabinet representative (Joe Dean) and Chairman of the Parliamentary Labour Party (Stan Orme) were automatically members.

The 18 winners of the election are listed below:

Colour key	Retained in the Shadow Cabinet
Colour key	Joined the Shadow Cabinet
Colour key	Voted out of the Shadow Cabinet

Rank	Candidate	Constituency	Votes
1	Gordon Brown	Dunfermline East	162
2	John Smith	Monklands East	153
3	Robin Cook	Livingston	141
4	Tony Blair	Sedgefield	138
5	Gerald Kaufman	Manchester Gorton	134
6	Joan Lestor	Eccles	129
7	Jo Richardson	Barking	126
8	Jack Cunningham	Copeland	125
9	Bryan Gould	Dagenham	124
10	Frank Dobson	Holborn and St Pancras	118
11	John Prescott	Kingston upon Hull East	116
12	Michael Meacher	Oldham West	115
13†	David Clark	South Shields	111
13†	Ann Clwyd	Cynon Valley	111
15	Donald Dewar	Glasgow Garscadden	109
16	Barry Jones	Alyn and Deeside	108
17	Margaret Beckett	Derby South	106
18	Jack Straw	Blackburn	104
19	Ann Taylor	Dewsbury	100
20	Martin O'Neill	Clackmannan	86
21	Clare Short	Birmingham Ladywood	83
22	Llin Golding	Newcastle-under-Lyme	82
23	David Blunkett	Sheffield Brightside	63
24	Tony Banks	Newham North West	62
25	Harriet Harman	Peckham	58
26	Tony Benn	Chesterfield	42
27†	Alan Williams	Carmarthen	52
27†	Barry Sheerman	Huddersfield	52
29	Jeff Rooker	Birmingham Perry Barr	50
30	Audrey Wise	Preston	46
31	Bob Cryer	Bradford South	42
32	Dennis Canavan	Falkirk West	41
33	John Garrett	Norwich South	33

† Multiple candidates tied for position.
