= 1988 Labour Party Shadow Cabinet election =

Election in the United Kingdom

Elections to the Labour Party's Shadow Cabinet (more formally, its "Parliamentary Committee") occurred in November 1988. In addition to the 15 members elected, the Leader (Neil Kinnock), Deputy Leader (Roy Hattersley), Labour Chief Whip (Derek Foster), Labour Leader in the House of Lords (Cledwyn Hughes), and Chairman of the Parliamentary Labour Party (Stan Orme) were automatically members.

The 15 winners of the election are listed below:

| Colour key | Retained in the Shadow Cabinet |
| Colour key | Joined the Shadow Cabinet |
| Colour key | Voted out of the Shadow Cabinet |

| Rank | Candidate | Constituency | Votes |
|---|---|---|---|
| 1 | Gordon Brown | Dunfermline East | 155 |
| 2 | John Smith | Monklands East | 144 |
| 3 | Gerald Kaufman | Manchester Gorton | 129 |
| 4 | David Clark | South Shields | 128 |
| 5† | Robin Cook | Livingston | 119 |
| 5† | Donald Dewar | Glasgow Garscadden | 119 |
| 7† | Frank Dobson | Holborn and St Pancras | 116 |
| 7† | Bryan Gould | Dagenham | 116 |
| 9 | Tony Blair | Sedgefield | 111 |
| 10 | Michael Meacher | Oldham West | 109 |
| 11 | Jack Straw | Blackburn | 100 |
| 12 | Barry Jones | Alyn and Deeside | 96 |
| 13 | John Prescott | Kingston upon Hull East | 94 |
| 14 | Jack Cunningham | Copeland | 88 |
| 15 | Jo Richardson | Barking | 86 |

† Multiple candidates tied for position.
