= 1984 Labour Party Shadow Cabinet election =

UK political party election

The results of elections to the Labour Party's Shadow Cabinet (more formally, its "Parliamentary Committee") were announced on 26 October 1984. In addition to the 15 members elected, the Leader (Neil Kinnock), Deputy Leader (Roy Hattersley), Labour Chief Whip (Michael Cocks), Labour Leader in the House of Lords (Cledwyn Hughes), and Chairman of the Parliamentary Labour Party (Jack Dormand) were automatically members.

Rank	Prior rank	Candidate	Constituency	Votes
1	2	Gerald Kaufman	Manchester Gorton	127
2	1	Denis Healey	Leeds East	117
3=	5	Jack Cunningham	Copeland	106
3=	13	Stan Orme	Salford East	106
5	4	John Smith	Monklands East	104
6	3	Peter Shore	Bethnal Green and Stepney	99
7	8	Peter Archer	Warley West	93
8=	9	Barry Jones	Alyn and Deeside	89
8=	6	John Prescott	Kingston upon Hull East	89
10	12=	Gwyneth Dunwoody	Crewe and Nantwich	88
11	12=	Michael Meacher	Oldham West	83
12=	18	Denzil Davies	Llanelli	81
12=	12=	Giles Radice	North Durham	81
14		Donald Dewar	Glasgow Garscadden	75
15	10	Robin Cook	Livingston	71

== Footnotes ==
Notes
