= Shadow Foreign Secretary =

UK shadow cabinet position

Shadow Secretary of State for Foreign, Commonwealth and Development Affairs
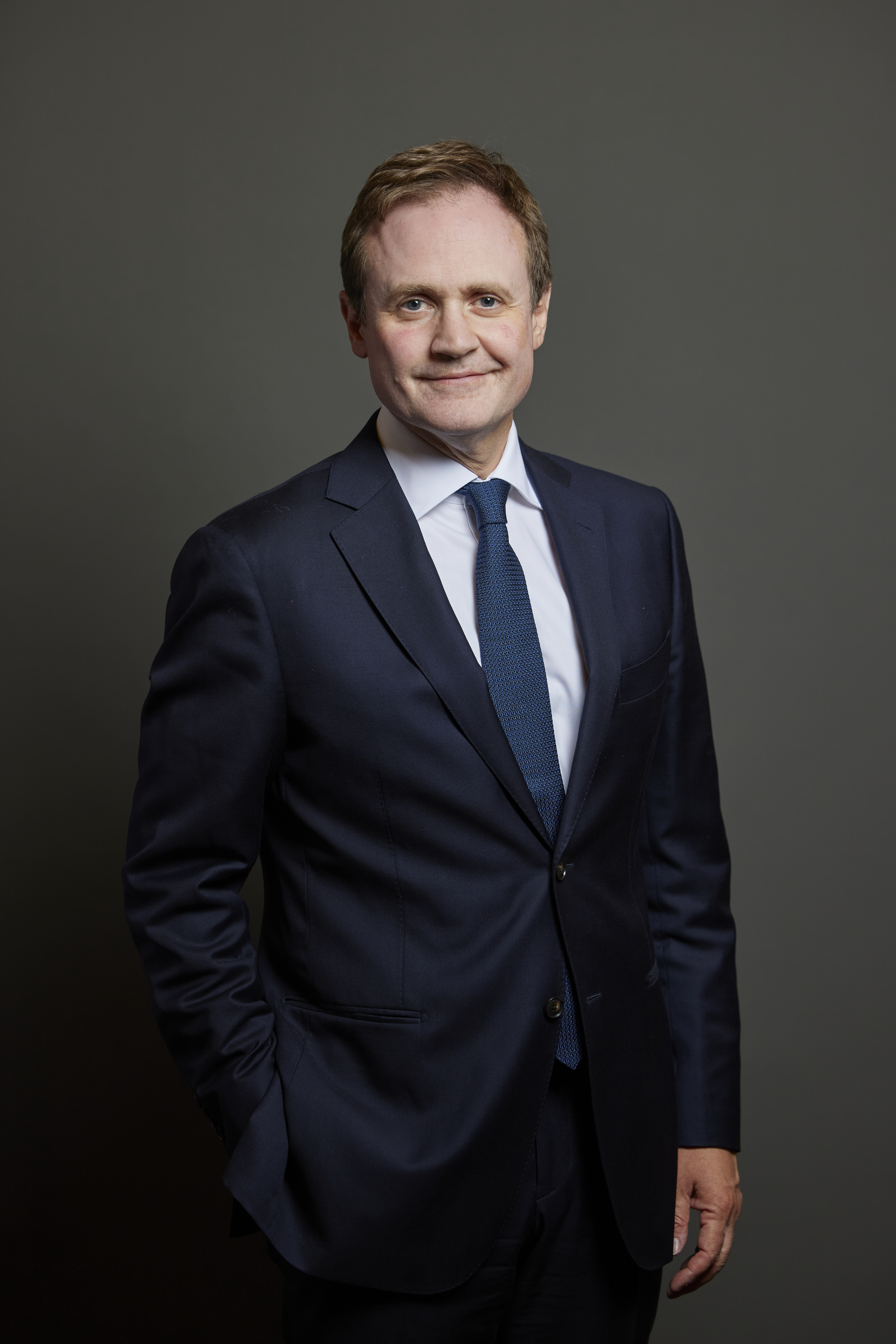
- Incumbent; Tom Tugendhat since 31 August 2026
- Shadow Cabinet
- Appointer: Leader of the Opposition
- Inaugural holder: Alfred Robens
- Formation: 15 July 1955

The shadow secretary of state for foreign, Commonwealth and development affairs, commonly called the shadow foreign secretary, is a position within the UK official opposition shadow cabinet that deals mainly with issues surrounding the Foreign Office. If elected, the person serving as shadow foreign secretary may be designated to serve as the new foreign secretary.

The current Shadow Secretary of State of foreign, commonwealth and development affairs is Tom Tugendhat. The shadow secretary (usually with one or more junior shadow ministers) holds the secretary of state for foreign, commonwealth and development affairs and other FCDO ministers to account in Parliament.

Although DFID and the role of international development secretary were abolished by the second Johnson government in 2020, the shadow secretary of state did not have responsibility for development until Lammy was appointed in November 2021. His predecessor, Lisa Nandy, served alongside the shadow secretary of state for international development, Preet Gill. This however is no longer the case after the November 2021 British shadow cabinet reshuffle.

== List of shadow foreign secretaries ==
Name	Portrait	Term of office		Political party	Shadow Cabinet
Anthony Eden		26 July 1945	26 October 1951	Conservative	Churchill
Herbert Morrison		26 October 1951	Unclear	Labour	Attlee II
Alfred Robens		15 July 1955	27 November 1956	Labour	Attlee II
Alfred Robens		15 July 1955	27 November 1956	Labour	Gaitskell
Aneurin Bevan		27 November 1956	6 July 1960	Labour	Gaitskell
Denis Healey		7 July 1960	30 November 1961	Labour	Gaitskell
Harold Wilson		30 November 1961	22 February 1963	Labour	Gaitskell
Harold Wilson		30 November 1961	22 February 1963	Labour	Brown
Patrick Gordon Walker		22 February 1963	15 October 1964	Labour	Wilson I
Rab Butler		15 October 1964	16 February 1965	Conservative	Douglas-Home
Reginald Maudling		16 February 1965	4 August 1965	Conservative	Douglas-Home
Christopher Soames		4 August 1965	13 April 1966	Conservative	Heath I
Alec Douglas-Home		13 April 1966	19 June 1970	Conservative	Heath I
Michael Stewart		19 June 1970	24 July 1970	Labour	Wilson II
Denis Healey		24 July 1970	19 April 1972	Labour	Wilson II
James Callaghan		19 April 1972	4 March 1974	Labour	Wilson II
Alec Douglas-Home		4 March 1974	August 1974	Conservative	Heath II
Geoffrey Rippon		August 1974	11 February 1975	Conservative	Heath II
Reginald Maudling		11 February 1975	11 April 1976	Conservative	Thatcher
John Davies		11 April 1976	6 November 1978	Conservative	Thatcher
Francis Pym (Note: Following Davies' resignation, it was announced that Pym would lead the two-day debate on Rhodesia for the Conservatives. By approximately 20 November, Norman St John-Stevas had replaced him as Shadow Leader of the House of Commons, and Pym continued as Shadow Foreign Secretary through the end of the Parliament in 1979.)		6 November 1978	4 May 1979	Conservative	Thatcher
David Owen		4 May 1979	14 June 1979	Labour	Callaghan
Peter Shore		14 June 1979	8 December 1980	Labour	Callaghan
Denis Healey		8 December 1980	13 June 1987	Labour	Foot
Denis Healey		8 December 1980	13 June 1987	Labour	Kinnock
Gerald Kaufman		13 June 1987	24 July 1992	Labour	Kinnock
Jack Cunningham		24 July 1992	20 October 1994	Labour	Smith
Jack Cunningham		24 July 1992	20 October 1994	Labour	Beckett
Robin Cook		20 October 1994	2 May 1997	Labour	Blair
John Major		7 May 1997	11 June 1997	Conservative	Major
Michael Howard		11 June 1997	15 June 1999	Conservative	Hague
John Maples		15 June 1999	2 February 2000	Conservative	Hague
Francis Maude		2 February 2000	18 September 2001	Conservative	Hague
Michael Ancram		18 September 2001	10 May 2005	Conservative	Duncan Smith
Michael Ancram		18 September 2001	10 May 2005	Conservative	Howard
Liam Fox		10 May 2005	6 December 2005	Conservative	Howard
William Hague		6 December 2005	11 May 2010	Conservative	Cameron
David Miliband		11 May 2010	8 October 2010	Labour	Harman I
Yvette Cooper		8 October 2010	20 January 2011	Labour	Miliband
Douglas Alexander		20 January 2011	11 May 2015	Labour	Miliband
Hilary Benn		11 May 2015	26 June 2016	Labour	Harman II
Hilary Benn		11 May 2015	26 June 2016	Labour	Corbyn
Emily Thornberry		27 June 2016	5 April 2020	Labour	Corbyn
Lisa Nandy		5 April 2020	29 November 2021	Labour	Starmer
David Lammy		29 November 2021	5 July 2024	Labour	Starmer
Andrew Mitchell		8 July 2024	4 November 2024	Conservative	Sunak
Dame Priti Patel		4 November 2024	31 August 2026	Conservative	Badenoch
Tom Tugendhat		31 August 2026	Incumbent	Conservative	Badenoch
