= Shadow Minister for Employment =

British opposition frontbench position

Shadow Secretary of State for Employment
- Appointer: Leader of the Opposition

The office of Shadow Minister for Employment is a position on the United Kingdom's Official Opposition frontbench, and has occasionally been a position in the Shadow Cabinet.

From 1970 to 1995, the duty of the office holder was to scrutinise the actions of the government's Secretary of State for Employment and develop alternative policies. From 1995, the office shadowed the Secretary of State for Education and Employment. In 2001, the office was replaced by that of Shadow Secretary of State for Work and Pensions after the creation of the Department for Work and Pensions.

In 2019, the office was reformed in the Shadow Cabinet of Jeremy Corbyn as Shadow Minister for Labour; later renamed Secretary of State for Employment Rights and, in the Shadow Cabinet of Keir Starmer, Shadow Secretary of State for Employment Rights and Protections. The position was vacant after the resignation of Andy McDonald, who was replaced by Alison McGovern in the November 2021 reshuffle.

== List of Shadow Secretaries ==
=== Shadow Minister for Labour and National Service ===
Shadow Minister	Took office	Left office	Political Party	Leader of the Opposition
David Maxwell Fyfe	c.1946	27 October 1951	Conservative	Winston Churchill
Alfred Robens	28 October 1951	Unknown	Labour	Clement Attlee
Aneurin Bevan	15 July 1955	15 February 1956	Labour	Clement Attlee
Aneurin Bevan	15 July 1955	15 February 1956	Labour	Hugh Gaitskell
George Brown	15 February 1956	27 November 1956	Labour	Hugh Gaitskell
Alfred Robens	27 November 1956	12 November 1959	Labour	Hugh Gaitskell
=== Shadow Minister for Labour ===
Shadow Minister	Took office	Left office	Political Party	Leader of the Opposition
Alfred Robens	12 November 1959	November 1960	Labour	Hugh Gaitskell
Frederick Lee	November 1960	6 December 1961	Labour	Hugh Gaitskell
Ray Gunter	6 December 1961	16 October 1964	Labour	Hugh Gaitskell
Ray Gunter	6 December 1961	16 October 1964	Labour	Harold Wilson
Joseph Godber	16 October 1964	5 August 1965	Conservative	Alec Douglas-Home
Keith Joseph	5 August 1965	23 February 1967	Conservative	Edward Heath
Robert Carr	23 February 1967	6 April 1968	Conservative	Edward Heath
=== Shadow Secretary of State for Employment and Productivity ===
Shadow Secretary	Took office	Left office	Political Party	Leader of the Opposition
Robert Carr	6 April 1968	19 June 1970	Conservative	Edward Heath
=== Shadow Secretary of State for Employment ===
Shadow Secretary	Took office	Left office	Political Party	Leader of the Opposition
Barbara Castle	19 June 1970	19 October 1971	Labour	Harold Wilson
James Callaghan	19 October 1971	19 April 1972	Labour	Harold Wilson
Reg Prentice	19 April 1972	4 March 1974	Labour	Harold Wilson
William Whitelaw	4 March 1974	12 June 1974	Conservative	Edward Heath
James Prior	12 June 1974	4 May 1979	Conservative	Edward Heath
James Prior	12 June 1974	4 May 1979	Conservative	Margaret Thatcher
Albert Booth	4 May 1979	14 July 1979	Labour	James Callaghan
Eric Varley	14 July 1979	31 October 1983	Labour	James Callaghan
Eric Varley	14 July 1979	31 October 1983	Labour	Michael Foot
John Smith	31 October 1983	26 October 1984	Labour	Neil Kinnock
John Prescott	26 October 1984	13 July 1987	Labour	Neil Kinnock
Michael Meacher	13 July 1987	2 November 1989	Labour	Neil Kinnock
Tony Blair	2 November 1989	18 July 1992	Labour	Neil Kinnock
Frank Dobson	18 July 1992	21 October 1993	Labour	John Smith
John Prescott	21 October 1993	20 October 1994	Labour	John Smith
Harriet Harman	20 October 1994	19 October 1995	Labour	Tony Blair
=== Shadow Secretary of State for Education and Employment ===
Shadow Secretary	Took office	Left office	Political Party	Leader of the Opposition
David Blunkett	19 October 1995	2 May 1997	Labour	Tony Blair
Gillian Shephard	2 May 1997	11 June 1997	Conservative	John Major
Stephen Dorrell	11 June 1997	15 June 1998	Conservative	William Hague
David Willetts	1 June 1998	15 June 1999	Conservative	William Hague
Theresa May	15 June 1999	18 September 2001	Conservative	William Hague
=== Shadow Minister for Labour ===
Shadow Minister	Took office	Left office	Political Party	Leader of the Opposition
Jack Dromey	10 October 2016	12 January 2018	Labour	Jeremy Corbyn
Laura Pidcock	12 January 2018	10 September 2019	Labour	Jeremy Corbyn
=== Shadow Secretary of State for Employment Rights ===
Shadow Secretary	Took office	Left office	Political Party	Leader of the Opposition
Laura Pidcock	10 September 2019	12 December 2019	Labour	Jeremy Corbyn
Rachael Maskell	7 January 2020	6 April 2020	Labour	Jeremy Corbyn
=== Shadow Secretary of State for Employment Rights and Protections ===
Shadow Secretary	Took office	Left office	Political Party	Leader of the Opposition
Andy McDonald	6 April 2020	27 September 2021	Labour	Keir Starmer
=== Shadow Minister for Employment ===
Shadow Minister	Took office	Left office	Political Party	Leader of the Opposition
Alison McGovern	4 December 2021	5 July 2024	Labour	Keir Starmer
