= Robert Hughes, Baron Hughes of Woodside =

British politician (1932–2022)

The Right Honourable The Lord Hughes of Woodside
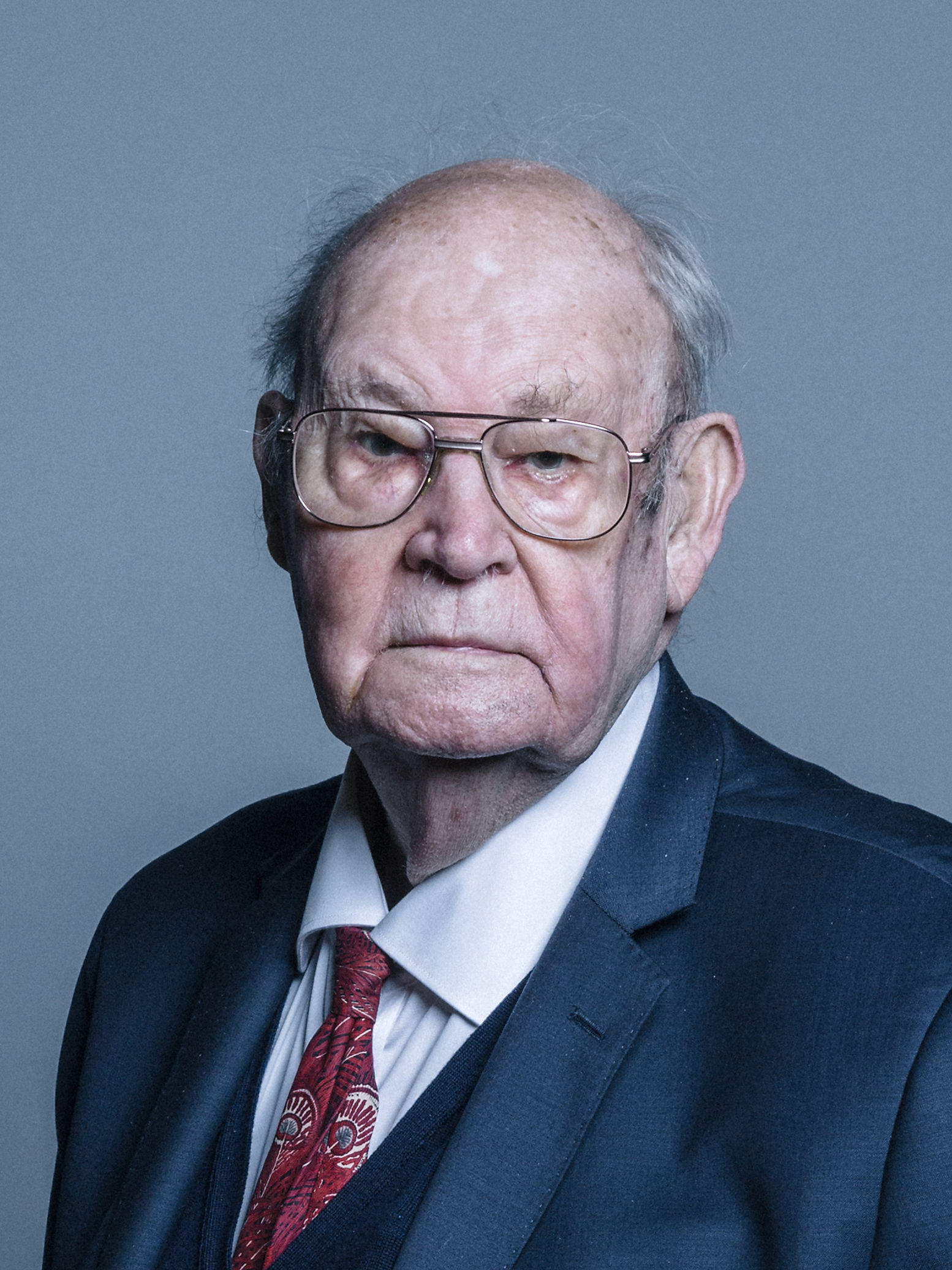
- Official portrait, 2018

Shadow Secretary of State for Transport
- In office 4 November 1985 – 23 November 1988
- Leader: Neil Kinnock
- Preceded by: Gwyneth Dunwoody
- Succeeded by: John Prescott

Parliamentary Under-Secretary of State for Scotland
- In office 11 March 1974 – 22 July 1975
- Prime Minister: Harold Wilson
- Preceded by: Hector Monro
- Succeeded by: Frank McElhone

Member of the House of Lords
- Lord Temporal
- Life peerage 27 September 1997 – 7 January 2022

Member of Parliament for Aberdeen North
- In office 18 June 1970 – 8 April 1997
- Preceded by: Hector Hughes
- Succeeded by: Malcolm Savidge

Personal details
- Born: Robert Hughes; 3 January 1932 Pittenweem, Scotland
- Died: 7 January 2022 (aged 90)
- Party: Labour

Robert Hughes, Baron Hughes of Woodside (3 January 1932 – 7 January 2022) was a British Labour Party politician and life peer who served as a Member of Parliament (MP) for 27 years, and was also Chair of the British Anti-Apartheid Movement (AAM) from 1976 until it was dissolved in 1995 after the ending of apartheid in South Africa.

== Political career ==
Hughes first stood for Parliament in 1959 at North Angus and Mearns, where he came second to the Conservative incumbent Colin Thornton-Kemsley. He was the Member of Parliament (MP) for Aberdeen North from 1970 to 1997.

He was Parliamentary Under-Secretary of State for Scotland from March 1974 until July 1975, when he resigned in disagreement with the government's incomes policy.

The 1979 vote of no confidence resulted from the Labour government overturning the "Yes" result of the Scottish devolution referendum. Rather than the SNP, prime minister James Callaghan blamed unionist rebels on his own benches for ultimately bringing about the collapse of his government and opening the door to victory for Margaret Thatcher's Conservatives. Hughes was one of those rebels. Tam Dalyell, Peter Doig, and Adam Hunter were the other Scottish Labour MPs who helped overturn the "Yes" vote.

In November 1985 Hughes was appointed to the Shadow Cabinet as Shadow Secretary of State for Transport. On 27 September 1997, he was created a life peer as Baron Hughes of Woodside, of Woodside in the City of Aberdeen.

=== Anti-Apartheid Movement ===
Under his chairmanship the Anti-Apartheid Movement campaigned against the Thatcher government's refusal to impose sanctions against South Africa in the 1980s and organised the 1988 "Free Mandela" concert at Wembley Stadium which was televised by the BBC and broadcast around the world. Hughes attended the independence celebrations in Namibia in 1990 and acted as an observer at South Africa's first democratic elections in April 1994. After the dissolution of the AAM he became the first Chairperson of its successor organisation, ACTSA: Action for Southern Africa.

== Personal life and death ==
Hughes was born in Pittenweem, Fife, Scotland on 3 January 1932, and educated at Robert Gordon's College, Aberdeen, and in South Africa, where he lived from 1947 until 1954 and worked as a draughtsman.

He was a patron of Humanists UK.

Hughes died on 7 January 2022, four days after his 90th birthday, after a long illness. Tony Blair, Anas Sarwar and Peter Hain paid tribute to him, with Blair saying, "He was a lovely, kind and exceptional man and embodied all that is best in public service."

Parliament of the United Kingdom
| Preceded by Hector Hughes | Member of Parliament for Aberdeen North; 1970–1997 | Succeeded by Malcolm Savidge |
