= Frank Dobson =

British politician (1940–2019)

The Right Honourable Frank Dobson
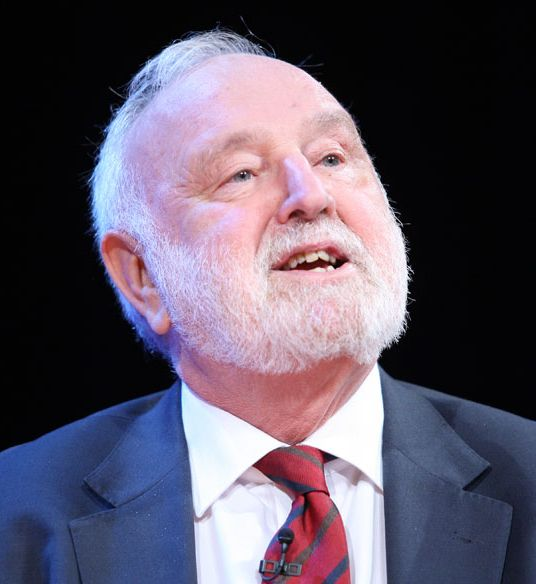
- Dobson in 2014

Secretary of State for Health
- In office 2 May 1997 – 11 October 1999
- Prime Minister: Tony Blair
- Preceded by: Stephen Dorrell
- Succeeded by: Alan Milburn
Shadow portfolios
Shadow Secretary of State for the Environment
In office 20 October 1994 – 2 May 1997
Leader	Tony Blair
Preceded by	Chris Smith
Succeeded by	John Gummer
Shadow Secretary of State for Transport
In office 21 October 1993 – 20 October 1994
Leader	John Smith; Margaret Beckett (Acting); Tony Blair
Preceded by	John Prescott
Succeeded by	Michael Meacher
Shadow Secretary of State for Employment
In office 18 July 1992 – 21 October 1993
Leader	John Smith
Preceded by	Tony Blair
Succeeded by	John Prescott
Shadow Secretary of State for Energy
In office 2 November 1989 – 18 July 1992
Leader	Neil Kinnock
Preceded by	John Prescott
Succeeded by	Robin Cook (Trade and Industry)
Shadow Leader of the House of Commons
In office 13 July 1987 – 2 November 1989
Leader	Neil Kinnock
Preceded by	Peter Shore
Succeeded by	Jack Cunningham

Member of Parliament for Holborn and St Pancras Holborn and St Pancras South (1979–1983)
- In office 3 May 1979 – 30 March 2015
- Preceded by: Lena Jeger
- Succeeded by: Keir Starmer

Personal details
- Born: Frank Gordon Dobson; 15 March 1940 York, England
- Died: 11 November 2019 (aged 79) London, England
- Party: Labour
- Spouse: Janet Mary Alker (m. 1967)
- Children: 3
- Education: London School of Economics

Frank Gordon Dobson (15 March 1940 – 11 November 2019) was a British politician who served as the Member of Parliament (MP) for Holborn and St Pancras from 1979 to 2015 (Holborn and St Pancras South until 1983). A member of the Labour Party, he served in the First Blair ministry as Secretary of State for Health from 1997 to 1999, and was the Labour nominee for Mayor of London in 2000, finishing third behind Conservative Steven Norris and the winner, Labour-turned-Independent Ken Livingstone. Dobson stood down from his Parliament seat at the 2015 general election.

== Early life and career ==
Dobson was born in 1940 in Dunnington, York, the son of Irene (née Shortland) and John William Dobson. His father, a railwayman, died when Dobson was sixteen years old. Dobson attended Dunnington County Church of England Primary School and the Archbishop Holgate Grammar School (now Archbishop Holgate's School), where he was supported after the death of his father by a grant from the county council. He then studied economics at the London School of Economics, gaining a BSc in 1962. He worked at the headquarters of the Central Electricity Generating Board from 1962 to 1970 and for the Electricity Council from 1970 to 1975.

After contesting a seat on Camden London Borough Council in 1964, he was elected in 1971 and chosen virtually unopposed as Labour Group Leader, and therefore as leader of the council after the resignation of Millie Miller in 1973. Having a young family, Dobson stood down as leader and resigned from the council in 1975 in favour of a non-partisan job as assistant secretary of the office of the Local Government Ombudsman, which he held until 1979.

== Member of Parliament ==
At the 1979 general election, Dobson was elected as MP for Holborn and St Pancras South (later Holborn and St Pancras). He voted for Tony Benn for Labour Deputy Leader in 1981, but thereafter became disillusioned and chose to align with what he called the "sane left".

Dobson's naturally pugnacious style earned him rapid promotion to the front bench, where he served in several important posts from 1982. His liking for dirty jokes and conviviality won him many friends. He once remarked of Hazel Blears, who is 4'10" in height, "The good thing about global warming is that Hazel Blears will be the first to go when the water rises." After privatisation of the Rover Group in 1988 he quipped, "The price charged for Rover was so low that there is some suspicion that Lord Young thought it was a dog." As Spokesman on Environment and London from 1994, he led the national Labour response to a series of scandals over City of Westminster council and its former leader Shirley Porter.

=== In government ===
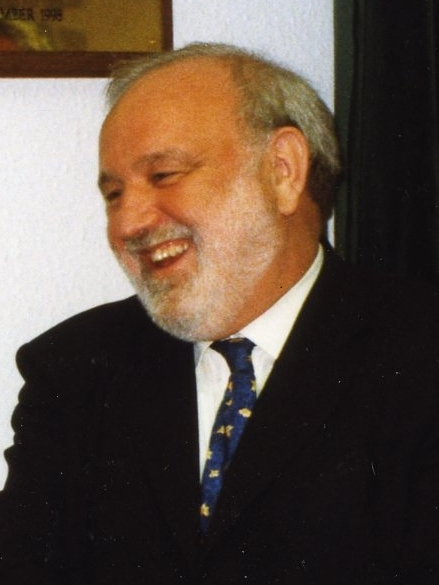
Dobson in 1998

Following Labour's landslide victory at the 1997 general election, Dobson was appointed as Secretary of State for Health. This was a high-profile post, but Dobson found it hard to build an impact. He faced interference from civil servants, who would claim that prime minister Tony Blair raised the issue of further private sector involvement in meetings with Dobson, which Dobson said to them "just wasn't true". He also had his hands tied by the decision to stick within spending limits set by the previous Conservative government. Dobson wrote a memo to Blair saying, "If you want a first-class service, you have to pay a first-class fare – and we're not doing it." When money was finally diverted to the NHS, Blair credited Dobson for kickstarting it. Dobson's abolition of the internal market in the NHS was reversed by his successor, Alan Milburn, who Dobson said was "carried away with the idea that the private sector could make a big contribution". Dobson was also instrumental, working with Tessa Jowell, in establishing Sure Start, which aimed to improve childcare, early education and health care for families with children.

=== Candidate for Mayor of London ===
Dobson beat Ken Livingstone in the Labour Party's internal selection process for the office of Mayor of London, helped by its electoral college system and the absence of any requirement for affiliated trade unions to ballot their members. In May 2000, Livingstone won the mayoral election as an independent candidate. Dobson finished in third place behind the Conservative candidate Steven Norris, and just ahead of the Liberal Democrat candidate Susan Kramer. Dobson was subsequently re-elected as an MP at the 2001 and 2005 general elections, albeit with reduced majorities.

== Political views ==
In 2000, Dobson was named "Beard 2000" by the Beard Liberation Front, amid controversy over his claim that Labour spin doctors had told him to shave off his prize-winning beard for the upcoming elections for Mayor of London. Dobson said he had told them to "Stick it up their wicket".

He was the subject of controversy for living in a council flat while receiving a six-figure minister's salary. He continued to live there, despite owning a large property in Yorkshire. In an interview in July 2014, he responded to this criticism, saying: "I first lived there when we were subtenants of a subtenant of a private landlord. We were then sold to Camden council. What should I have done? Exercised the right to buy, which I voted against?"

In the Labour leadership controversy after Tony Blair's declaration he would step down within a year of September 2006, Dobson called for Blair to step down right away and end uncertainty. He also attacked Alan Milburn for making a "terrible mess" of the NHS. Milburn had been mentioned by Charles Clarke as a potential future Labour leader several hours earlier.

Dobson was criticised for hypocrisy after he spoke against Post Office closures, then voted for such closures in Parliament.

In the expenses scandal, he supported the Speaker of the House in his attempts to block exposure of expenses, arguing he was merely being scapegoated (for example, on BBC Radio 4 on 16 May 2009). He also supported the Speaker in allowing a warrant-less search of the offices of Conservative MP Damian Green.

A survey of his constituents revealed that in 2008, Dobson responded to 69 letters out of 269 sent through WriteToThem.com, putting him in 605th place out of 638 MPs for which data was available.

== Personal life ==
Dobson's brother Geoff, a schoolteacher, died of liver cancer on the eve of Labour's landslide general election victory in 1997. Dobson married Janet Mary Alker; they had three children.

With his "portly frame, jovial expression and bright white beard", Dobson was sometimes compared jokingly to Father Christmas. He supported West Ham United.

Dobson died at Homerton University Hospital in London on 11 November 2019, at the age of 79. His death drew tributes from former Labour prime ministers Tony Blair and Gordon Brown, the then Labour leader Jeremy Corbyn, his constituency successor Keir Starmer, and Labour's current London mayor, Sadiq Khan.

Parliament of the United Kingdom
Preceded by Lena Jeger	Member of Parliament for Holborn and St Pancras South; 1979–1983	Constituency abolished
New constituency	Member of Parliament for Holborn and St Pancras; 1983–2015	Succeeded by Keir Starmer
Political offices
Preceded by Peter Shore	Shadow Leader of the House of Commons; 1987–1989	Succeeded by Jack Cunningham
Preceded by John Prescott	Shadow Secretary of State for Energy; 1989–1992	Succeeded by Robin Cook as Shadow Secretary of State for Trade and Industry
Preceded by Tony Blair	Shadow Secretary of State for Employment; 1992–1993	Succeeded by John Prescott
Preceded by John Prescott	Shadow Secretary of State for Transport; 1993–1994	Succeeded by Michael Meacher
Preceded by Chris Smith	Shadow Secretary of State for the Environment; 1994–1997	Succeeded by John Gummer
Preceded by Stephen Dorrell	Secretary of State for Health; 1997–1999	Succeeded by Alan Milburn
