= David Clark, Baron Clark of Windermere =

British politician (born 1939)

The Right Honourable The Lord Clark of Windermere PC DL
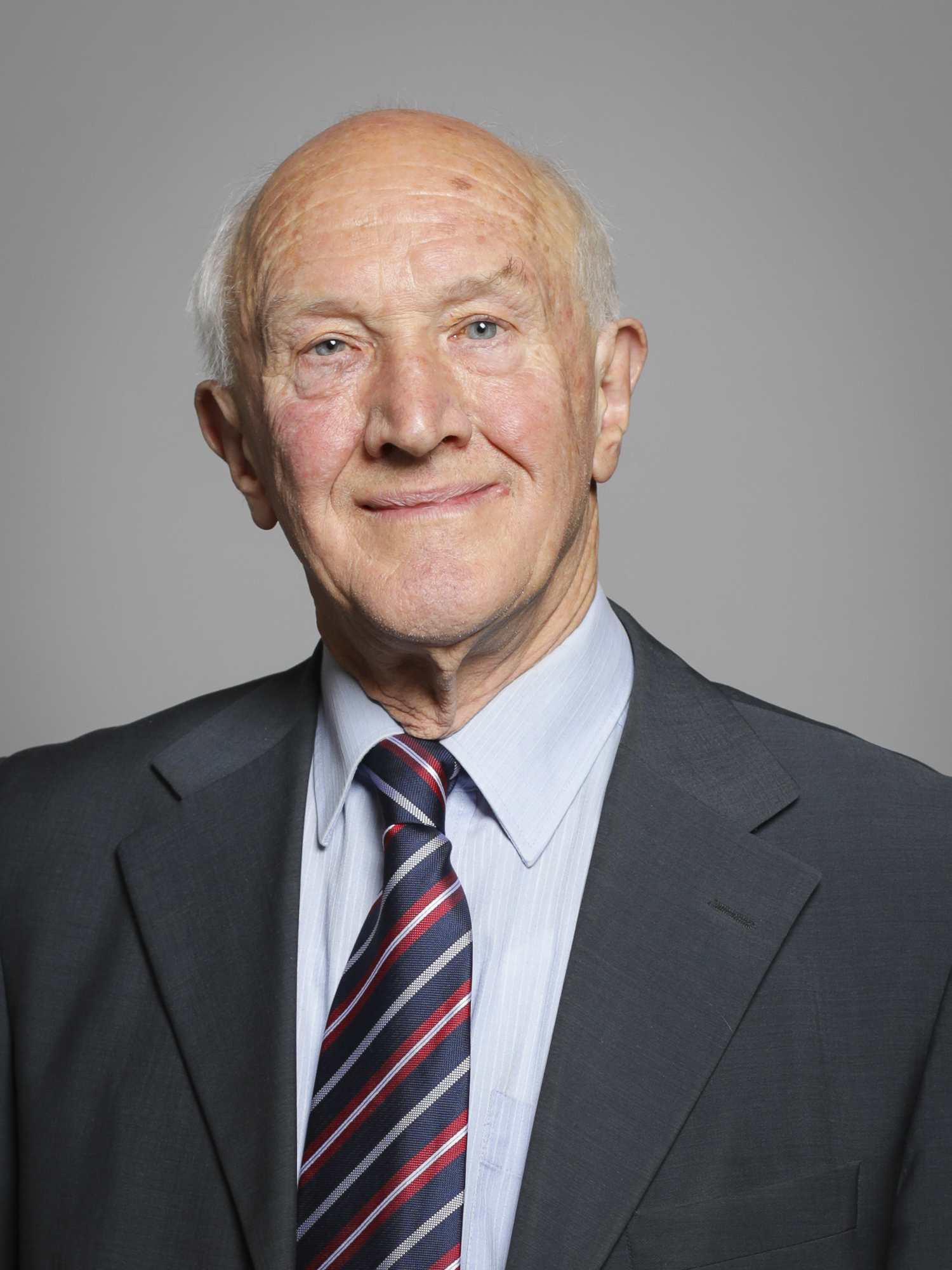
- Official portrait, 2019

Minister for the Cabinet Office Chancellor of the Duchy of Lancaster
- In office 2 May 1997 – 27 July 1998
- Prime Minister: Tony Blair
- Preceded by: Roger Freeman
- Succeeded by: Jack Cunningham

Shadow Secretary of State for Defence
- In office 18 July 1992 – 2 May 1997
- Leader: John Smith; Margaret Beckett (Acting); Tony Blair
- Preceded by: Martin O'Neill
- Succeeded by: John Major

Shadow Minister of Agriculture, Fisheries and Food
- In office 13 July 1987 – 18 July 1992
- Leader: Neil Kinnock
- Preceded by: Roger Freeman
- Succeeded by: Jack Cunningham

Member of Parliament for South Shields
- In office 3 May 1979 – 14 May 2001
- Preceded by: Arthur Blenkinsop
- Succeeded by: David Miliband

Member of Parliament for Colne Valley
- In office 18 June 1970 – 8 February 1974
- Preceded by: Richard Wainwright
- Succeeded by: Richard Wainwright

Member of the House of Lords
- Lord Temporal
- Life peerage 2 July 2001

Personal details
- Born: 19 October 1939 (age 87) Castle Douglas, Dumfries and Galloway, Scotland
- Party: Labour
- Education: Victoria University of Manchester; University of Sheffield

David George Clark, Baron Clark of Windermere (born 19 October 1939) is a British Labour Party politician, former cabinet minister and author.

== Education and early career ==
Clark was born in Castle Douglas, Scotland. He attended Bowness Elementary School and Windermere Grammar School in Cumbria. After leaving school, he worked as a forester and then as a laboratory assistant in a textile mill before becoming a student teacher in 1959.

Clark attended the University of Manchester as a mature student from 1960, gaining a BA in Economics, then later an M.Sc. He was President of the Students' Union. In 1978, he gained a PhD from the University of Sheffield.

He was a lecturer in Government and Administration at the University of Salford from 1965 to 1970 and a tutor at University of Manchester from 1967 to 1970.

== Parliament ==
Clark joined the Labour Party in 1959 and the Co-operative Party two years later. He stood unsuccessfully for Manchester Withington at the 1966 General Election, being defeated by the incumbent Conservative, Sir Robert Cary.

He was first elected as a member of parliament (MP) for Colne Valley which he represented from 1970 to 1974. After losing in the February 1974 general election, he became a senior lecturer in Politics at Huddersfield Polytechnic (now the University of Huddersfield) until 1979 when he returned to the House of Commons as Member of Parliament for South Shields in Tyne and Wear which he held until he stood down at the 2001 general election.

=== Shadow cabinet ===
Clark was regularly elected to the Shadow Cabinet while the Labour Party was in opposition. He held a number of Shadow portfolios, including Agriculture Fisheries & Food (1972–1974), Defence (1980–81), Food Agricultural and Rural Affairs (1987–1992), and Shadow Defence Secretary (1992–1997). Although he was not a strong supporter of New Labour, he did support Tony Blair's bid for the party leadership in 1994.

=== Government ===
Clark's long-standing position as a member of Labour's frontbench team meant Blair was obliged to appoint him to the Cabinet when the party was elected to government in May 1997. However, he was not given a senior or middle-ranking position, and instead was given the office of Chancellor of the Duchy of Lancaster, with responsibility for producing a White Paper on Freedom of Information which was published in July 1998 and ultimately led to the Freedom of Information Act 2000.

Clark opposed moves to water down the freedom of information proposals from what had been proposed by Labour in Opposition, and this led to his sacking. At the time, he said that he believed his sacking was also because of his insistence on living in the North-East and "missing out on the London cocktail circuit". Additionally, Blair's sacking of Clark and another "old Labour" figure, Gavin Strang, was part of a plan by Blair to bring two Liberal Democrats into the Cabinet, a plan thwarted by John Prescott and others (though it is highly likely the Liberal Democrats would not have accepted the plan anyway had it become public).

Heavily involved and interested in Bosnia, Clark was forced to apologise for not declaring a 1993 meeting with Radovan Karadžić in the Register of Members' Interests, as he "thought it had been a United Nations-funded trip".

=== Speaker's election ===
Two years later, on 23 October 2000, Clark stood for the job of Speaker of the House of Commons in succession to Betty Boothroyd but was unsuccessful (192 votes in favour, 257 against) and his backbench colleague, Michael Martin was elected.

=== 2001 general election and resignation ===
Clark sought reselection by the South Shields Constituency Labour Party to contest the 2001 general election for the seat. However, control of the constituency Party had swung in favour of a vocal group of critics, led by a faction within South Tyneside Council, who feared Clark actually intended to stand down when the General Election was called, thus enabling the Labour Party's National Executive Committee to parachute a favoured candidate into the Constituency, historically a safe Labour seat. During the reselection contest Clark vigorously denied the claims and told the Shields Gazette newspaper advising he had every intention of contesting the general election. In the event, he won reselection thanks to the support of regional trade union barons.

When Prime Minister Tony Blair announced the date of the general election in 2001, Clark immediately stood down and the Labour Party NEC moved swiftly, New Labour rising star David Miliband was selected to fight the seat. Miliband, an Oxford graduate from London, was seen locally as a parachute candidate.

Within weeks of the Labour Party winning the 2001 general election, Clark was created a life peer on 2 July 2001 as Baron Clark of Windermere, of Windermere in the County of Cumbria and now sits in the House of Lords. He was also appointed to the paid post of chairman of the Forestry Commission.

=== House of Lords ===
Clark's ongoing political interests include Bosnia, open spaces, hunting and bloodsports (to which he is opposed), defence and the environment.

He was awarded Freedom of the Borough of South Tyneside in February 1999, and is a long-standing fan of Carlisle United Football Club, of which he is a director. He served as a deputy lieutenant of Cumbria from 2007 to 2014. Clark was chair of the Atlantic Council of the UK (1998–2003), and has been Leader of the North Atlantic Assembly since 2001, having been a member since 1980. He was a member of the executive of the National Trust from 1980 until 1994. He was chair of the Forestry Commission from 2004 to 2009; a non-executive director of the Homeowners Friendly Society, the Thales Group, and the UK Friendly Insurance Services. He is a trustee of the Vindolanda Trust, the History of Parliament Trust, and the Gravetye Trust, and a patron of the UK Defence Forum. He chairs the Lake District National Park Partnership.

== Personal life ==
He married Christine Kirkby, in 1970 and they have one daughter and one son, Catherine and Thomas. He lives in Windermere, and lists his recreations as gardening, fell walking, reading, and watching football. He is a director of Carlisle United Football Club.

== Honours ==
- He was sworn in as a member of the Privy Council of the United Kingdom in 1997, giving him the honorific title "The Right Honourable" and after ennoblement the Post Nominal Letters "PC" for life.
- He was awarded the Freedom of the Town of South Shields in 1999.
- He was made a baron in the Peerage of the United Kingdom in 2001 by Prime Minister Tony Blair, allowing him a seat in the House of Lords where he sits with the Labour Party.
- He took the title Baron Clark of Windermere.
- He served as a deputy lieutenant of the County of Cumbria from 2007 to 2014. This allowed him the post nominal letters "DL" for life.
- He was awarded an honorary fellowship in November 2009 of the University of Cumbria.

Parliament of the United Kingdom
Preceded by Richard Wainwright	Member of Parliament for Colne Valley; 1970 – 1974	Succeeded by Richard Wainwright
Preceded by Arthur Blenkinsop	Member of Parliament for South Shields; 1979–2001	Succeeded by David Miliband
Political offices
Preceded by Roger Freeman	Shadow Minister of Agriculture, Fisheries and Food; 1987–1992	Succeeded by Jack Cunningham
Preceded by Martin O'Neill	Shadow Secretary of State for Defence; 1992–1997	Succeeded by John Major
Preceded by Roger Freeman	Minister for the Cabinet Office; 1997–1998	Succeeded by Jack Cunningham
Preceded by Roger Freeman	Chancellor of the Duchy of Lancaster; 1997–1998	Succeeded by Jack Cunningham
Orders of precedence in the United Kingdom
Preceded by The Lord Grocott	Gentlemen; Baron Clark of Windermere	Followed by The Lord Fowler
