= Robin Cook =

British politician (1946–2005)

The Right Honourable Robin Cook
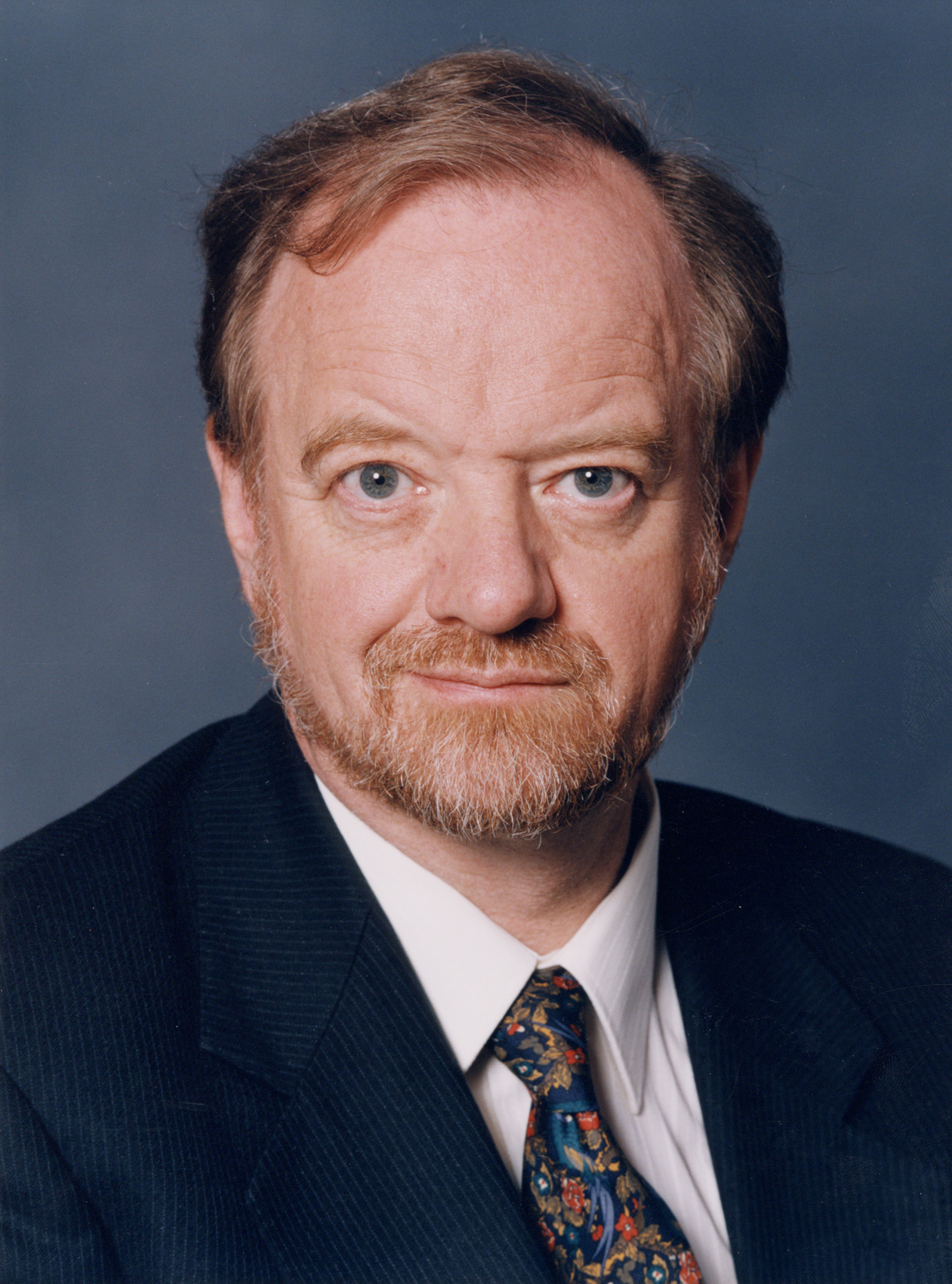
- Official portrait, 2000

President of the Party of European Socialists
- In office 11 June 2001 – 24 July 2004
- Preceded by: Rudolf Scharping
- Succeeded by: Poul Nyrup Rasmussen

Leader of the House of Commons; Lord President of the Council
- In office 8 June 2001 – 17 March 2003
- Prime Minister: Tony Blair
- Preceded by: Margaret Beckett
- Succeeded by: John Reid

Foreign Secretary
- In office 2 May 1997 – 8 June 2001
- Prime Minister: Tony Blair
- Preceded by: Malcolm Rifkind
- Succeeded by: Jack Straw
Shadow Cabinet posts
Shadow Foreign Secretary
In office 20 October 1994 – 2 May 1997
Leader	Tony Blair
Preceded by	Jack Cunningham
Succeeded by	John Major
Shadow Secretary of State for Trade and Industry
In office 18 July 1992 – 20 October 1994
Leader	John Smith; Margaret Beckett
Preceded by	Gordon Brown
Succeeded by	Jack Cunningham
Shadow Secretary of State for Health (Note: Health and Social Services from 13 July 1987 to 2 November 1989. He was succeeded in the social security brief by Michael Meacher.)
In office 2 November 1989 – 18 July 1992
Leader	Neil Kinnock
Preceded by	Michael Meacher
Succeeded by	David Blunkett

Member of Parliament
- In office 28 February 1974 – 6 August 2005
- Preceded by: Tom Oswald
- Succeeded by: Jim Devine
- Constituency: Edinburgh Central (1974–1983); Livingston (1983–2005)

Personal details
- Born: Robert Finlayson Cook; 28 February 1946 Bellshill, Scotland
- Died: 6 August 2005 (aged 59) Inverness, Scotland
- Resting place: Grange Cemetery, Edinburgh, Scotland
- Party: Labour
- Spouses: Margaret Whitmore (m. 1969; div. 1998); Gaynor Regan (m. 1998)
- Children: 2
- Education: University of Edinburgh (MA)
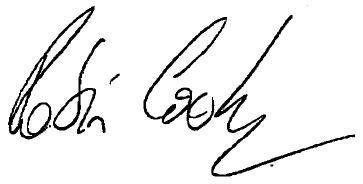
- Signature
- Robin Cook's voice Cook on Serbian cooperation with the ICTY following the overthrow of Slobodan Milošević; Recorded 9 October 2000

Robert Finlayson "Robin" Cook (28 February 1946 – 6 August 2005) was a British Labour Party politician who served as a Member of Parliament (MP) from 1974 until his death in 2005 and served in the Cabinet as Foreign Secretary from 1997 until 2001, when he was replaced by Jack Straw. He then served as Leader of the House of Commons from 2001 until 2003.

Cook studied at the University of Edinburgh before being elected as the Member of Parliament for Edinburgh Central in 1974; he switched to the Livingston constituency in 1983. In Parliament, he was known for his debating ability and rapidly rose through the political ranks and ultimately into the Cabinet. As Foreign Secretary, he oversaw British interventions in Kosovo and Sierra Leone.

Cook resigned from his positions as Lord President of the Council and Leader of the House of Commons on 17 March 2003 in protest against the invasion of Iraq. At the time of his death, he was President of the Foreign Policy Centre and a Vice-President of the America All Party Parliamentary Group and the Global Security and Non-Proliferation All Party Parliamentary Group.

== Early life ==
Robin Cook was born in the County Hospital, Bellshill, Scotland, the only son of Peter and Christina Cook (née Lynch) (29 May 1912 – 20 March 2003). His father was a chemistry teacher who grew up in Fraserburgh, and his grandfather was a miner before being blacklisted for being involved in a strike.

Cook was educated at Aberdeen Grammar School and, from 1960, the Royal High School in Edinburgh. At first, Cook intended to become a Church of Scotland minister, but lost his faith as he discovered politics. He joined the Labour Party in 1965 and became an atheist. He remained so for the rest of his life.

He then studied English literature at the University of Edinburgh, where he obtained a postgraduate MA degree with honours. He began studying for a PhD degree on Charles Dickens and Victorian serial novels, supervised by John Sutherland, but gave it up in 1970.

In 1971, after a period working as a secondary school teacher, Cook became a tutor-organiser of the Workers' Educational Association for Lothian, and a local councillor in Edinburgh. He gave up both posts when he was elected as a Member of Parliament (MP) on his twenty-eighth birthday, in February 1974.

== Early years in Parliament ==
Cook unsuccessfully contested the Edinburgh North constituency at the 1970 general election, but was elected to the House of Commons at the February 1974 general election as Member of Parliament for Edinburgh Central, defeating George Foulkes for nomination. In 1981, Cook was a member of the anti-nuclear Labour Party Defence Study Group.

When the constituency boundaries were revised for the 1983 general election, he transferred to the new Livingston constituency after Tony Benn declined to run for the seat. Cook represented Livingston until his death. In parliament, Cook joined the left-wing Tribune Group of the Parliamentary Labour Party and frequently opposed the policies of the Wilson and Callaghan governments. He was an early supporter of constitutional and electoral reform (he opposed devolution in the 1979 referendum but came out in favour on election night in 1983) and of efforts to increase the number of female MPs. In May 2005, Cook said: "My nightmare is that we will have been 12 years in office, with the ability to reform the electoral system, and will fail to do so until we are back in opposition, in perhaps a decade of Conservative government, regretting that we left in place the electoral system that allowed Conservative governments on a minority vote."

Cook supported unilateral nuclear disarmament and the abandoning of the Labour Party's euroscepticism of the 1970s and 1980s. During his early years in parliament, Cook championed several liberalising social measures, to mixed effect. He repeatedly (and unsuccessfully) introduced a private member's bill on divorce reform in Scotland, but succeeded in July 1980 – and after three years' trying – with an amendment to bring the Scottish law on homosexuality into line with that in England. After Labour were defeated at the general election in May 1979, Cook supported Michael Foot's leadership bid and joined his campaign committee. When Tony Benn challenged Denis Healey for the party's deputy leadership in September 1981, Cook supported Healey.

== In opposition ==
Cook became known as a brilliant parliamentary debater, and rose through the party ranks, becoming a frontbench spokesman in 1980, and reaching the Shadow Cabinet in June 1983, as spokesperson on European affairs. He was campaign manager for Neil Kinnock's successful 1983 bid to become leader of the Labour Party. A year later he was made party campaign co-ordinator but in October 1986 Cook was surprisingly voted out of the shadow cabinet. He was re-elected in July 1987 and in October 1988 elected to Labour's National Executive Committee. He was one of the key figures in the modernisation of the Labour Party under Kinnock. He was Shadow Health Secretary (1987–92) and Shadow Trade Secretary (1992–94), before taking on foreign affairs in 1994, the post he would become most identified with (Shadow Foreign Secretary 1994–97, Foreign Secretary 1997–2001).

In 1994, following the death of John Smith, he ruled himself out of contention for the Labour leadership, apparently on the grounds that he was "insufficiently attractive" to be an election winner, although two close family bereavements in the week in which the decision had to be made may have contributed.

On 26 February 1996, following the publication of the Scott Report into the 'Arms-to-Iraq' affair, he made a speech in response to the then President of the Board of Trade Ian Lang in which he said: "this is not just a Government which does not know how to accept blame; it is a Government which knows no shame". His parliamentary performance on the occasion of the publication of the five-volume, 2,000-page Scott Report – which he claimed he was given just two hours to read before the relevant debate, thus giving him three seconds to read every page – was widely praised on both sides of the House as one of the best performances the Commons had seen in years and one of Cook's finest hours. The government won the vote by a majority of one.

As Joint Chairman (alongside Liberal Democrat MP Robert Maclennan) of the Labour-Liberal Democrat Joint Consultative Committee on Constitutional Reform, Cook brokered the 'Cook-Maclennan Agreement' that laid the basis for the fundamental reshaping of the British constitution outlined in Labour's 1997 general election manifesto. This led to legislation for major reforms including Scottish and Welsh devolution, the Human Rights Act and removing the majority of hereditary peers from the House of Lords.

== In government ==
=== Foreign Secretary ===
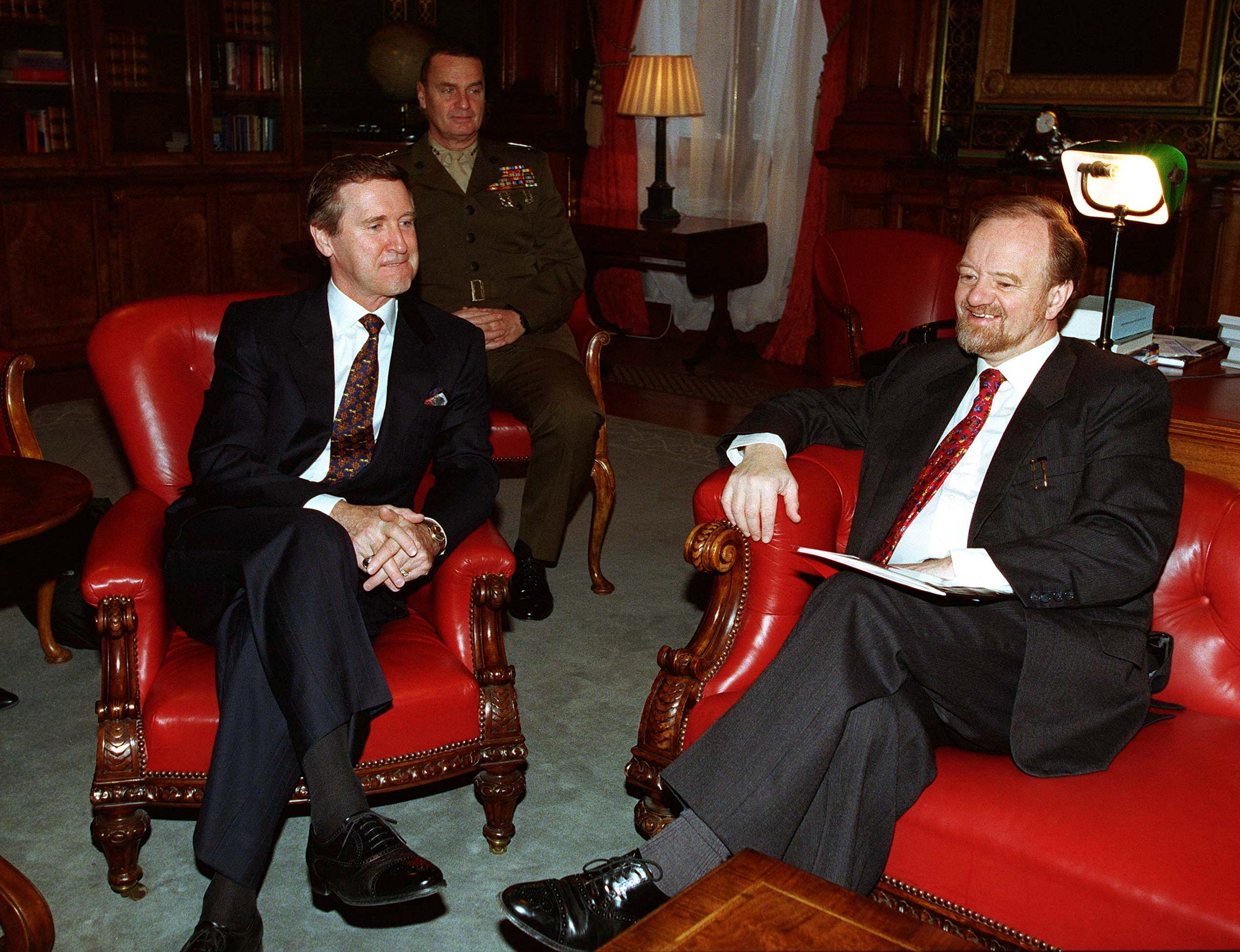
Cook with United States Secretary of Defense William Cohen in December 1997

With the election of a Labour government led by Tony Blair at the 1997 general election, Cook as expected became Foreign Secretary, having served as Shadow for the previous three years. He was believed to have coveted an economics ministry, but was reportedly excluded at the insistence of Gordon Brown. He announced, to much scepticism, his intention to add "an ethical dimension" to foreign policy; his careful phrasing was immediately taken by the press to mean that the government was adopting an ethical foreign policy.

In his early days as Foreign Secretary, he made a diplomatic faux pas. He removed a portrait of the Nepalese Maharaja Sir Bir Shamsher Jang Bahadur Rana from his office, replacing it with a portrait of Oliver Cromwell. Shortly afterwards, a delegation led by the Taoiseach of the Republic of Ireland, Bertie Ahern arrived to the office for a meeting. Reportedly on seeing the portrait, they walked out and Ahern declared he would not return until the portrait was removed due to Cromwell's actions in Ireland. However, Ahern stated that the delegation did not walk out but did express discomfort.

His term as Foreign Secretary was marked by British interventions in Kosovo and Sierra Leone. Both of these were controversial, the former because it was not sanctioned by the UN Security Council, and the latter because of allegations that the British company Sandline International had supplied arms to supporters of the deposed president in contravention of a United Nations embargo. Cook was also embarrassed when his apparent offer to mediate in the dispute between India and Pakistan over Kashmir was rebuffed. The ethical dimension of his policies was subject to inevitable scrutiny, leading to criticism at times that there was a gap between action and rhetoric.

Cook was responsible for achieving the agreement between the UK and Iran that ended the Iranian death threat against author Salman Rushdie, allowing both nations to normalize diplomatic relations. He is also credited with having helped resolve the eight-year impasse over the Pan Am Flight 103 bombing trial by getting Libya to agree to hand over the two accused (Megrahi and Fhimah) in 1999, for trial in the Netherlands according to Scots law.

In March 1998, a diplomatic rift ensued with Israel when Israeli Prime Minister Benjamin Netanyahu cancelled a dinner with Cook, while Cook was visiting Israel and had demonstrated opposition to the expansion of Israeli settlements.

Cook enjoyed a positive working relationship with Madeleine Albright but found it hard to adjust to the new administration of George W. Bush that took office in early 2001.

Although reported to have had republican sympathies, he and Queen Elizabeth II were said to be on good terms due to their mutual interest in horses.

=== Leader of the House of Commons ===
Following the 2001 general election he was moved, against his wishes, from the Foreign Office to be Leader of the House of Commons. This was widely seen as a demotion – although it is a Cabinet post, it is substantially less prestigious than the Foreign Office – and Cook nearly turned it down. In the end he accepted, and looking on the bright side welcomed the chance to spend more time on his favourite stage. According to The Observer, it was Blair's fears over political battles within the Cabinet over Europe, and especially the Euro, which saw him demote the pro-European Cook.

As Leader of the House, he was responsible for reforming the hours and practices of the Commons and for leading the debate on reform of the House of Lords. He also spoke for the Government during the controversy surrounding the membership of Commons Select Committees which arose in 2001, where Government whips were accused of pushing aside the outspoken committee chairs Gwyneth Dunwoody and Donald Anderson. He was President of the Party of European Socialists from May 2001 to April 2004.

In early 2003, during a television appearance on BBC's debating series Question Time, he was inadvertently referred to as "Robin Cock" by David Dimbleby. Cook responded with good humour with "Yes, David Bumblebee", and Dimbleby apologised twice on air for his slip. The episode also saw Cook in the uncomfortable position of defending the Government's stance over the impending invasion of Iraq, weeks before his resignation over the issue.

He documented his time as Leader of the House of Commons in a widely acclaimed memoir The Point of Departure, which discussed in diary form his efforts to reform the House of Lords and to persuade his ministerial colleagues, including Tony Blair, to distance the Labour Government from the foreign policy of the Bush administration. The former political editor of Channel 4 News, Elinor Goodman called the book 'the best insight yet into the workings of the Blair cabinet', the former editor of The Observer, Will Hutton, called it "the political book of the year – a lucid and compelling insider's account of the two years that define the Blair Prime Ministership".

=== Resignation over Iraq war ===
In early 2003, he was reported to be one of the cabinet's chief opponents of military action against Iraq, and on 17 March he resigned from the Cabinet. In a statement giving his reasons for resigning, he said, "I can't accept collective responsibility for the decision to commit Britain now to military action in Iraq without international agreement or domestic support." He also praised Blair's "heroic efforts" in pushing for the so-called second resolution regarding the Iraq disarmament crisis, but lamented "The reality is that Britain is being asked to embark on a war without agreement in any of the international bodies of which we are a leading partner – not NATO, not the European Union and, now, not the Security Council". Cook's heartfelt resignation speech in the House of Commons received an unprecedented standing ovation from some fellow MPs, and was described by the BBC's Andrew Marr as "without doubt one of the most effective, brilliant resignation speeches in modern British politics." Most unusually for the British parliament, Cook's speech was met with growing applause from all sides of the House and from the public gallery. According to The Economist's obituary, that was the first speech ever to receive a standing ovation in the history of the House.

== Outside the government ==
Following his 2003 resignation from the Cabinet, Cook remained an active backbench Member of Parliament until his death. After leaving the Government, Cook was a leading analyst of the decision to go to war in Iraq, giving evidence to the Foreign Affairs Select Committee which was later relevant during the Hutton and Butler inquiries. He was sceptical of the proposals contained in the Government's Higher Education Bill, and abstained on its second reading. He also took strong positions in favour of both the proposed European Constitution, and the reform of the House of Lords to create a majority-elected second chamber, about which he said (while he was Leader of the Commons), "I do not see how [the House of Lords] can be a democratic second Chamber if it is also an election-free zone".

In October 2004, Cook hosted an episode of the long-running BBC panel show Have I Got News for You.

In the years after his exit from the Foreign Office, and particularly following his resignation from the Cabinet, Cook made up with Gordon Brown after decades of personal animosity — an unlikely reconciliation after a mediation attempt by Frank Dobson in the early 1990s had seen Dobson conclude (to John Smith) "You're right. They hate each other." Cook and Brown focused on their common political ground, discussing how to firmly entrench progressive politics after the exit of Tony Blair. Chris Smith said in 2005 that in recent years Cook had been setting out a vision of "libertarian, democratic socialism that was beginning to break the sometimes sterile boundaries of 'old' and 'New' Labour labels". With Blair's popularity waning, Cook campaigned vigorously in the run-up to the 2005 general election to persuade Labour doubters to remain with the party.

In a column for the Guardian four weeks before his death, Cook caused a stir when he described Al-Qaeda as a product of a western intelligence:

Bin Laden was, though, a product of a monumental miscalculation by Western security agencies. Throughout the 80s he was armed by the CIA and funded by the Saudis to wage jihad against the Russian occupation of Afghanistan. Al-Qaeda, literally "the database", was originally the computer file of the thousands of mujahideen who were recruited and trained with help from the CIA to defeat the Russians.

Some commentators and senior politicians said that Cook seemed destined for a senior Cabinet post under a Brown premiership.

In the 2005 general election, his first election as a backbencher in over 20 years, he held his Livingston seat with an increased majority of 13,097, where he remained until his death 3 months later.

== Personal life ==
Cook's first wife was Margaret Katherine Whitmore, from Somerset, whom he met at Edinburgh University. They married on 15 September 1969 at St Alban's Church, Westbury Park, Bristol, and had two sons.

Shortly after he became Foreign Secretary, Cook ended his relationship with Margaret, revealing that he was having an extramarital affair with one of his staff, Gaynor Regan. He announced his intentions to leave his wife via a press statement made at Heathrow on 2 August 1997. Cook was forced into a decision over his private life following a telephone conversation with Alastair Campbell as he was about to go on holiday with his first wife. Campbell explained that the press was about to break the story of his affair with Regan. His estranged wife subsequently accused him of having had several extramarital affairs and alleged he had a habit of drinking heavily.

Cook married Regan in Tunbridge Wells, Kent, on 9 April 1998, four weeks after his divorce was finalised.

Introduced to horse racing by his first wife, Cook was a racing tipster in his spare time. Between 1991 and 1998 Cook wrote a weekly tipster's column for Glasgow's Herald newspaper, a post in which he was succeeded by Alex Salmond.

== Death ==
At the start of August 2005, Cook and his wife, Gaynor, took a fortnight-long holiday in the Scottish Highlands. At around 2:20 pm on 6 August 2005, while he walked down Ben Stack in Sutherland, Cook suddenly suffered a severe heart attack, collapsed, lost consciousness and fell about 8 feet (2.4 m) down a ridge. He was assisted after his fall by another hill-walker who refused all publicity and was granted anonymity. A helicopter containing paramedics arrived 30 minutes after a 999 call was made. Cook then was flown to Raigmore Hospital, Inverness.

Gaynor did not get in the helicopter and walked down the mountain. Despite efforts made by the medical team to revive Cook in the helicopter, he was already beyond recovery, and at 4:05 pm, minutes after arrival at the hospital, was pronounced dead. He was 59. Two days later, a post-mortem examination found that Cook had died of hypertensive heart disease.

A funeral was held on 12 August 2005, at St Giles' Cathedral in Edinburgh, even though Cook had been an atheist. Gordon Brown gave the eulogy, and German foreign minister Joschka Fischer was one of the mourners. Tony Blair, who was on holiday at the time, did not attend.

A later memorial service at St Margaret's, Westminster, on 5 December 2005, included a reading by Blair and tributes by Brown and Madeleine Albright. On 29 September 2005, Cook's friend and election agent since 1983, Jim Devine, won the resulting by-election with a reduced majority.

In January 2007, a headstone was erected in the Grange Cemetery in Edinburgh, where Cook is buried, bearing the epitaph: "I may not have succeeded in halting the war, but I did secure the right of parliament to decide on war." It is a reference to Cook's strong opposition to the 2003 invasion of Iraq and the words were reportedly chosen by his widow and two sons from his previous marriage.

In April 2022, Police Scotland were asked by an individual, whose name was redacted, for seven pieces of unanswered information surrounding Cook's death. The request was initially refused, but the Scottish Information Commissioner ruled the police had breached the Freedom of Information (Scotland) Act 2002 by doing so. Since this development, controversy has re-emerged around the circumstances of Cook's death.

== Explanatory notes ==
Parliament of the United Kingdom
Preceded by Tom Oswald	Member of Parliament for Edinburgh Central; 1974–1983	Succeeded by Alexander Fletcher
New constituency	Member of Parliament for Livingston; 1983–2005	Succeeded by Jim Devine
Party political offices
Preceded by David Bean	Chair of the Fabian Society; 1990–1991	Succeeded by Oonagh McDonald
Preceded by Diane Jeuda	Chair of the Labour Party; 1996–1997	Succeeded by Richard Rosser
Preceded by Rudolf Scharping	President of the Party of European Socialists; 2001–2004	Succeeded by Poul Nyrup Rasmussen
Political offices
Preceded by Michael Meacher	Shadow Secretary of State for Health and Social Services; 1987–1989	Succeeded by Himself as Shadow Secretary of State for Health
Preceded by Michael Meacher	Shadow Secretary of State for Health and Social Services; 1987–1989	Succeeded by Michael Meacher as Shadow Secretary of State for Social Security
Preceded by Himself as Shadow Secretary of State for Health and Social Services	Shadow Secretary of State for Health; 1989–1992	Succeeded by David Blunkett
Preceded by Gordon Brown	Shadow Secretary of State for Trade and Industry; 1992–1994	Succeeded by Jack Cunningham
Preceded by Jack Cunningham	Shadow Foreign Secretary; 1994–1997	Succeeded by John Major
Preceded by Malcolm Rifkind	Foreign Secretary; 1997–2001	Succeeded by Jack Straw
Preceded by Margaret Beckett	Leader of the House of Commons; 2001–2003	Succeeded by John Reid
Preceded by Margaret Beckett	Lord President of the Council; 2001–2003	Succeeded by John Reid
