= Jack Cunningham, Baron Cunningham of Felling =

British politician (born 1939)

The Right Honourable The Lord Cunningham of Felling PC DL
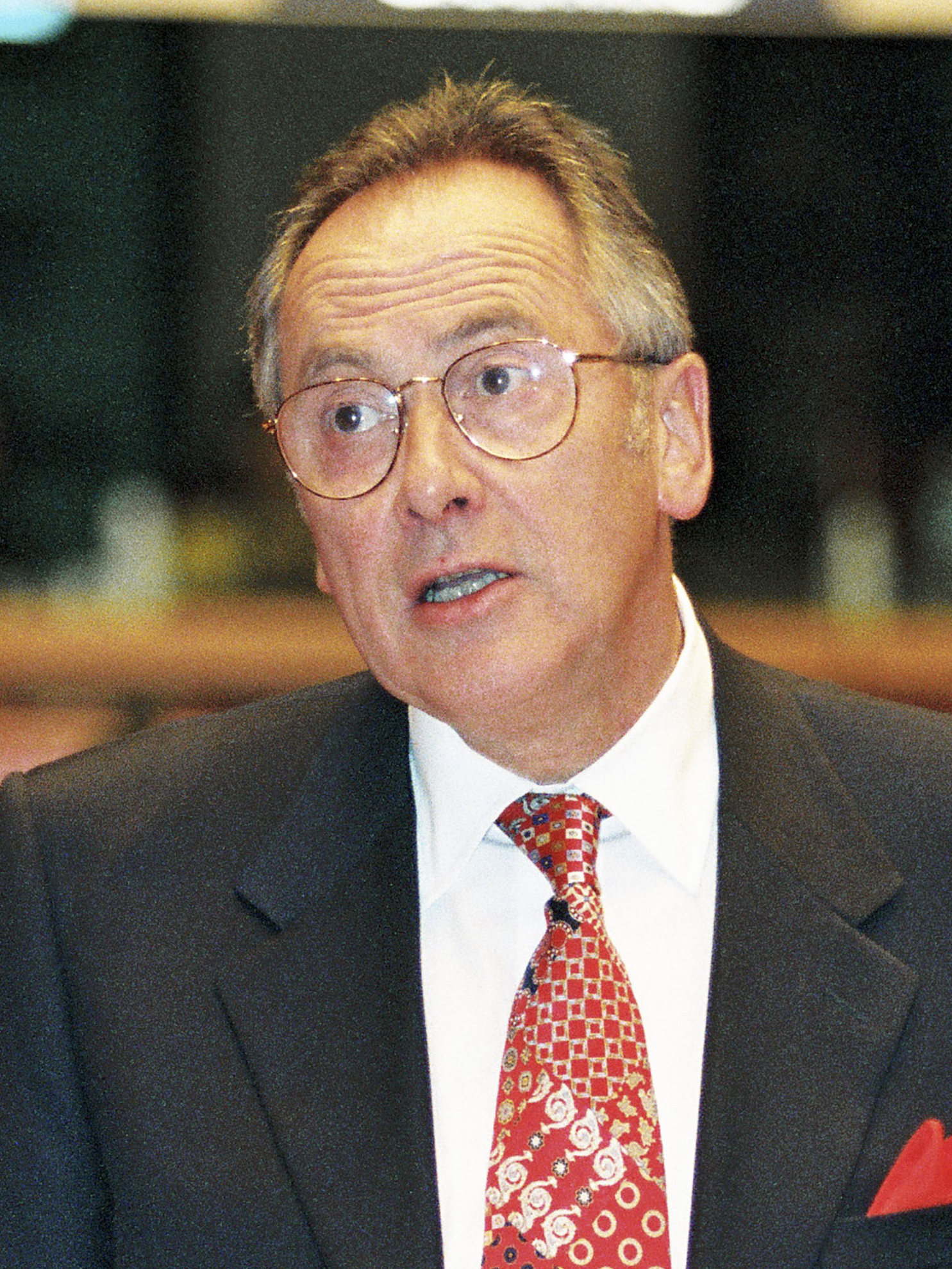
- Cunningham in 1998

Minister for the Cabinet Office Chancellor of the Duchy of Lancaster
- In office 27 July 1998 – 11 October 1999
- Prime Minister: Tony Blair
- Preceded by: David Clark
- Succeeded by: Mo Mowlam

Minister of Agriculture, Fisheries and Food
- In office 2 May 1997 – 27 July 1998
- Prime Minister: Tony Blair
- Preceded by: Douglas Hogg
- Succeeded by: Nick Brown
Shadow Cabinet positions
Shadow Secretary of State for National Heritage
In office 19 October 1995 – 2 May 1997
Leader	Tony Blair
Preceded by	Chris Smith
Succeeded by	Virginia Bottomley
Shadow Secretary of State for Trade and Industry
In office 20 October 1994 – 19 October 1995
Leader	Tony Blair
Preceded by	Robin Cook
Succeeded by	Margaret Beckett
Shadow Foreign Secretary
In office 24 July 1992 – 20 October 1994
Leader	John Smith; Margaret Beckett (Acting); Tony Blair
Preceded by	Gerald Kaufman
Succeeded by	Robin Cook
Shadow Leader of the House of Commons
In office 2 November 1989 – 24 July 1992
Leader	Neil Kinnock
Preceded by	Frank Dobson
Succeeded by	Margaret Beckett
Shadow Secretary of State for the Environment
In office 2 October 1983 – 2 November 1989
Leader	Neil Kinnock
Preceded by	Gerald Kaufman
Succeeded by	Bryan Gould

Under Secretary of State for Energy
- In office 10 September 1976 – 4 May 1979
- Prime Minister: James Callaghan
- Preceded by: Gordon Oakes
- Succeeded by: Norman Lamont

Parliamentary Private Secretary to the Prime Minister
- In office 10 September 1976 – 21 February 1977
- Prime Minister: James Callaghan
- Preceded by: John Tomlinson
- Succeeded by: Roger Stott

Member of Parliament for Copeland Whitehaven (1970–1983)
- In office 18 June 1970 – 11 April 2005
- Preceded by: Joseph Symonds
- Succeeded by: Jamie Reed

Member of the House of Lords
- Lord Temporal
- Life peerage 27 June 2005 – 20 April 2026

Personal details
- Born: John Anderson Cunningham; 4 August 1939 (age 87) Durham, England
- Party: Labour
- Education: Durham University

John Anderson Cunningham, Baron Cunningham of Felling, PC DL (born 4 August 1939) is a British politician who was a Labour Member of Parliament for over 30 years, serving for Whitehaven from 1970 to 1983 and then Copeland until the 2005 general election, and had served in the Cabinet of Tony Blair.

== Background ==
His father was Andrew Cunningham, leader of the Labour Party in the Northern Region in the 1970s, who was disgraced in the 1974 Poulson scandal. Dr Cunningham was first elected as member for Whitehaven in 1970, and the renamed Copeland constituency, which was the same as Whitehaven, in 1983.

== Early life ==
Cunningham was educated at Jarrow Grammar School (now Jarrow School) in the same class as Doug McAvoy, future general secretary of the National Union of Teachers. Cunningham then studied at Bede College of Durham University, receiving a BSc in Chemistry in 1962, and a PhD in 1967. He stayed at the university to become a research fellow from 1966 to 1968, whilst working as an officer for the General and Municipal Workers' Union.

He was a district councillor for Chester-le-Street Rural & Parish Council, prior to becoming an MP and continued to live in the Garden Farm area of the town, bringing up his family there.

== Political career ==
Cunningham joined the Shadow cabinet in 1983, and was appointed to be a Deputy Lieutenant of the County of Cumbria in 1991. He ran the Labour Party's general election campaign in 1992. He also appeared on many television election programmes as one of the main spokesmen of the Labour Party.

=== Minister ===
Following the Labour landslide victory at the 1997 general election, he became Minister of Agriculture, Fisheries and Food and embarked on a modernisation programme for the Ministry. He worked to secure the lifting of the EU ban on the export of UK beef, and achieved some limited success on this.

=== Cabinet ===
Cunningham was shifted in 1998 to Minister for the Cabinet Office and Chancellor of the Duchy of Lancaster. The media dubbed him cabinet enforcer, claiming that his role was effectively to sell the Government and its policies to the public and the media. He also led the government's work on modernising government, and chaired the Ministerial Committee on genetically modified foods and crops.

=== Backbenches ===
Cunningham retired from the Cabinet in 1999, and returned to the backbenches. He stood down from Parliament at the 2005 general election. Having represented the parliamentary constituency that includes Sellafield, the UK's largest nuclear facility for 35 years; he is a strong proponent of nuclear power and is the founding European legislative Chairman of the Transatlantic Nuclear Energy Forum.

=== House of Lords ===
In the 2005 Dissolution Honours, he was raised to the peerage as Baron Cunningham of Felling, of Felling in the County of Tyne and Wear.

Lord Cunningham of Felling remained active in politics until his retirement on 20 April 2026. In the chamber he chaired an all-party parliamentary committee to review the powers of the House of Lords.

=== Lobbyist allegations ===
Cunningham was suspended from the Labour Party whip, and the party, in June 2013 pending an investigation over claims he had offered to work for lobbyists. He was subsequently cleared of any wrongdoing by the parliamentary standards authorities, and had the Labour whip restored.

=== Expenses claimed in the House of Lords ===
Research conducted by the Guardian newspaper revealed that Lord Cunningham claimed a total of £75,122 for 154 days' attendance in 2017–2018. This was the largest claim for attendance and travel expenses out of all the sitting members in the House of Lords. £23,108 of the £75,122 was claimed for air travel expenses.

== Personal life ==
Cunningham lives with his wife near Stocksfield, in Northumberland and is an avid fly fisherman. In 2016 Cunningham was awarded with the Order of the Rising Sun, Gold and Silver Star.

== Sources ==
- Announcement of his introduction at the House of Lords House of Lords minutes of proceedings, 11 October 2005

Parliament of the United Kingdom
Preceded by Joseph Symonds	Member of Parliament for Whitehaven; 1970–1983	Constituency abolished
New constituency	Member of Parliament for Copeland; 1983–2005	Succeeded by Jamie Reed
Political offices
Preceded by Gerald Kaufman	Shadow Secretary of State for the Environment; 1983–1989	Succeeded by Bryan Gould
Preceded by Frank Dobson	Shadow Leader of the House of Commons; 1989–1992	Succeeded by Margaret Beckett
Preceded by Gerald Kaufman	Shadow Foreign Secretary; 1992–1994	Succeeded by Robin Cook
Preceded by Robin Cook	Shadow Secretary of State for Trade and Industry; 1994–1995	Succeeded by Margaret Beckett
Preceded by Chris Smith	Shadow Secretary of State for National Heritage; 1995–1997	Succeeded by Virginia Bottomley
Preceded by Douglas Hogg	Minister of Agriculture, Fisheries and Food; 1997–1998	Succeeded by Nick Brown
Preceded by David Clark	Minister for the Cabinet Office; 1998–1999	Succeeded by Mo Mowlam
Preceded by David Clark	Chancellor of the Duchy of Lancaster; 1998–1999	Succeeded by Mo Mowlam
Orders of precedence in the United Kingdom
Preceded by The Lord Smith of Finsbury	Gentlemen; Baron Cunningham of Felling	Followed by The Lord Anderson of Swansea
