= Labour Party Shadow Cabinet elections =

UK political party elections

Until they were abolished in 2011 it had been the tradition for the British Labour Party to hold elections to the Shadow Cabinet whenever the Party was in Opposition. Shadow cabinet members would be elected by the MPs within the Parliamentary Labour Party, usually at the beginning of a Parliamentary session. The PLP voted to abolish Shadow Cabinet elections at a meeting on 5 July 2011. The decision was later approved by Labour's National Executive Committee at the end of July, then at their annual conference in Liverpool in September.

== See also ==
- 1951 Labour Party Shadow Cabinet election
- 1952 Labour Party Shadow Cabinet election
- 1953 Labour Party Shadow Cabinet election
- 1954 Labour Party Shadow Cabinet election
- 1955 Labour Party Shadow Cabinet election
- 1956 Labour Party Shadow Cabinet election
- 1957 Labour Party Shadow Cabinet election
- 1958 Labour Party Shadow Cabinet election
- 1959 Labour Party Shadow Cabinet election
- 1960 Labour Party Shadow Cabinet election
- 1961 Labour Party Shadow Cabinet election
- 1962 Labour Party Shadow Cabinet election
- 1963 Labour Party Shadow Cabinet election
- 1970 Labour Party Shadow Cabinet election
- 1971 Labour Party Shadow Cabinet election
- 1972 Labour Party Shadow Cabinet election
- 1973 Labour Party Shadow Cabinet election
- 1979 Labour Party Shadow Cabinet election
- 1980 Labour Party Shadow Cabinet election
- 1981 Labour Party Shadow Cabinet election
- 1982 Labour Party Shadow Cabinet election
- 1983 Labour Party Shadow Cabinet election
- 1984 Labour Party Shadow Cabinet election
- 1985 Labour Party Shadow Cabinet election
- 1986 Labour Party Shadow Cabinet election
- 1987 Labour Party Shadow Cabinet election
- 1988 Labour Party Shadow Cabinet election
- 1989 Labour Party Shadow Cabinet election
- 1990 Labour Party Shadow Cabinet election
- 1991 Labour Party Shadow Cabinet election
- 1992 Labour Party Shadow Cabinet election
- 1993 Labour Party Shadow Cabinet election
- 1994 Labour Party Shadow Cabinet election
- 1995 Labour Party Shadow Cabinet election
- 1996 Labour Party Shadow Cabinet election
- 2010 Labour Party Shadow Cabinet election
