= Gaitskell shadow cabinet =

Labour Shadow Cabinet of 1955 to 1963

Shadow Cabinet of Hugh Gaitskell
- Shadow Cabinet of United Kingdom
- 1955 – 1963
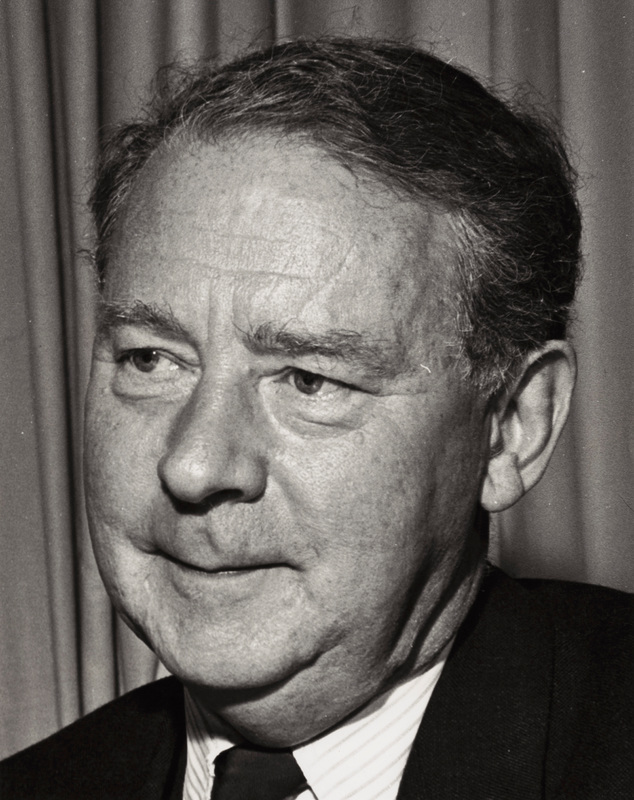
- Gaitskell in 1961
- Date formed: 14 December 1955
- Date dissolved: 18 January 1963

People and organisations
- Monarch: Elizabeth II
- Leader of the Opposition: Hugh Gaitskell
- Deputy Leader of the Opposition: Jim Griffiths (1956–1959); Aneurin Bevan (1959–1960); George Brown (1960–1963)
- Member party: Labour Party
- Status in legislature: Official Opposition 277 / 630 (44%) (1955) 258 / 630 (41%) (1959)

History
- Outgoing election: 1955 general election
- Legislature terms: 41st UK Parliament; 42nd UK Parliament
- Incoming formation: 1955 Labour Party leadership election
- Outgoing formation: 1963 Labour Party leadership election
- Predecessor: Shadow Cabinet of Clement Attlee
- Successor: Shadow Cabinet of George Brown

The Shadow Cabinet of Hugh Gaitskell was created on following the election of Hugh Gaitskell as Labour leader on 14 December 1955.

== Shadow Cabinet list ==
Portfolio	Shadow Minister	Term
Leader of Her Majesty's Most Loyal Opposition; Leader of the Labour Party	Hugh Gaitskell	1955 – 1963
Deputy Leader of the Opposition; Deputy Leader of the Labour Party	Vacant	1955 – 1956
Deputy Leader of the Opposition; Deputy Leader of the Labour Party	Jim Griffiths	1956 – 1959
Deputy Leader of the Opposition; Deputy Leader of the Labour Party	Aneurin Bevan	1959 – 1960
Deputy Leader of the Opposition; Deputy Leader of the Labour Party	Vacant	1960
Deputy Leader of the Opposition; Deputy Leader of the Labour Party	George Brown	1960 – 1963
Shadow Chancellor of the Exchequer	Hugh Gaitskell	1955 – 1956
Shadow Chancellor of the Exchequer	Harold Wilson	1956 – 1961
Shadow Chancellor of the Exchequer	James Callaghan	1961 – 1963
Shadow Foreign Secretary	Alfred Robens	1955 – 1956
Shadow Foreign Secretary	Aneurin Bevan	1956 – 1959
Shadow Foreign Secretary	Denis Healey	1959 – 1961
Shadow Foreign Secretary	Harold Wilson	1961 – 1963
Shadow Home Secretary	Kenneth Younger	1955 – 1957
Shadow Home Secretary	Patrick Gordon Walker	1957 – 1962
Shadow Home Secretary	George Brown	1962 – 1963
Shadow Minister of Defence	Richard Stokes	1955 – 1956
Shadow Minister of Defence	George Brown	1956 – 1962
Shadow Minister of Defence	Patrick Gordon Walker	1962 – 1963
Shadow Secretary of State for the Colonies	Jim Griffiths	1955 – 1956
Shadow Secretary of State for the Colonies	Aneurin Bevan	1956
Shadow Secretary of State for the Colonies	James Callaghan	1956 – 1961
Shadow Secretary of State for the Colonies	Denis Healey	1961 – 1963
Shadow Secretary of State for Commonwealth Relations	Patrick Gordon Walker	1955 – 1956
Shadow Secretary of State for Commonwealth Relations	Arthur Creech Jones	1956 – 1958
Shadow Secretary of State for Commonwealth Relations	Arthur Bottomley	1958 – 1959
Shadow Secretary of State for Commonwealth Relations	Hilary Marquand	1959 – 1961
Shadow Secretary of State for Commonwealth Relations	John Strachey	1961 – 1963
Shadow Minister for Health	Edith Summerskill	1955 – 1961
Shadow Minister for Health	Kenneth Robinson	1961 – 1963
Shadow Minister of Labour	Aneurin Bevan	1955 – 1956
Shadow Minister of Labour	George Brown	1956
Shadow Minister of Labour	Alfred Robens	1956 – 1960
Shadow Minister of Labour	Frederick Lee	1960 – 1961
Shadow Minister of Labour	Ray Gunter	1961 – 1963
Shadow Minister of Public Buildings and Works	Tony Greenwood	1955 – 1959
Shadow Minister of Public Buildings and Works	Barbara Castle	1959 – 1960
Shadow Minister of Public Buildings and Works	Unknown	1960 – 1961
Shadow Minister of Public Buildings and Works	Dick Mitchison	1961 – 1963
Shadow Secretary of State for Scotland	Tom Fraser	1955 – 1961
Shadow Secretary of State for Scotland	William Ross	1961 – 1963
Leader of the Opposition in the House of Lords	The Earl Alexander of Hillsborough	1955 – 1963
Opposition Chief Whip in the House of Commons	Herbert Bowden	1955 – 1963

== Initial Shadow Cabinet ==
Gaitskell announced his Shadow Cabinet on 15 February 1956 following the election of Jim Griffiths as deputy leader. Before that members of Attlee's Shadow Cabinet remained in place.

- Hugh Gaitskell – Leader of Her Majesty's Most Loyal Opposition and Leader of the Labour Party
- Jim Griffiths – Deputy Leader of the Opposition and Deputy Leader of the Labour Party
- Harold Wilson – Shadow Chancellor of the Exchequer
- Alfred Robens – Shadow Foreign Secretary
- Kenneth Younger – Shadow Home Secretary
- Aneurin Bevan – Shadow Secretary of State for the Colonies
- Richard Stokes – Shadow Minister of Defence
- George Brown – Shadow Minister for Labour and National Service and Shadow Minister of Aviation
- Philip Noel-Baker – Shadow Minister for Power
- Tony Greenwood – Shadow Minister of Public Buildings and Works
- James Callaghan – Shadow First Lord of the Admiralty
- Dick Mitchison – Shadow Minister of Housing and Local Government
- Edith Summerskill – Shadow Minister for Health
- Tom Fraser – Shadow Secretary of State for Scotland
- Earl Alexander – Leader of the Opposition in the House of Lords
- Herbert Bowden – Opposition Chief Whip in the House of Commons
- Earl of Lucan – Opposition Chief Whip in the House of Lords

=== Junior Shadow Ministers ===
- Tom Williams - Shadow Minister of Agriculture, Fisheries and Food
- Lynn Ungoed-Thomas – Shadow Attorney General for England and Wales
- Douglas Jay – Shadow Chief Secretary to the Treasury
- Arthur Creech Jones – Shadow Secretary of State for Commonwealth Relations
- Michael Stewart – Shadow Minister of Education
- Patrick Gordon Walker – Shadow President of the Board of Trade
- Hilary Marquand – Shadow Minister of Pensions and National Insurance
- Arthur Bottomley – Shadow Minister for Trade
- George Strauss – Shadow Minister of Transport
- Ernest Popplewell – Opposition Deputy Chief Whip in the House of Commons

== November 1956 reshuffle ==
Following the 1956 shadow cabinet election, Gaitskell reshuffled the front bench on 27 November. Richard Stokes was dropped from the frontbench and was replaced by Frank Soskice.

- Hugh Gaitskell – Leader of Her Majesty's Most Loyal Opposition and Leader of the Labour Party
- Jim Griffiths – Deputy Leader of the Opposition and Deputy Leader of the Labour Party
- Harold Wilson – Shadow Chancellor of the Exchequer
- Aneurin Bevan – Shadow Foreign Secretary
- Kenneth Younger – Shadow Home Secretary
- James Callaghan – Shadow Secretary of State for the Colonies
- George Brown – Shadow Minister of Defence and Shadow Minister of Aviation
- Alfred Robens – Shadow Minister for Labour and National Service
- Tony Greenwood – Shadow Minister of Public Buildings and Works
- Dick Mitchison – Shadow Minister of Housing and Local Government
- Edith Summerskill – Shadow Minister for Health
- Frank Soskice – Shadow Attorney General for England and Wales
- Tom Fraser – Shadow Secretary of State for Scotland
- Philip Noel-Baker – Shadow Minister for Foreign Affairs
- Earl Alexander – Leader of the Opposition in the House of Lords
- Herbert Bowden – Opposition Chief Whip in the House of Commons
- Earl of Lucan – Opposition Chief Whip in the House of Lords

=== Junior Shadow Ministers ===
- Tom Williams - Shadow Minister of Agriculture, Fisheries and Food
- Douglas Jay – Shadow Chief Secretary to the Treasury
- Arthur Creech Jones – Shadow Secretary of State for Commonwealth Relations
- Michael Stewart – Shadow Minister of Education
- Patrick Gordon Walker – Shadow President of the Board of Trade
- Hilary Marquand – Shadow Minister of Pensions and National Insurance
- Harold Neal – Shadow Minister for Power
- Lynn Ungoed-Thomas – Shadow Solicitor General
- Arthur Bottomley – Shadow Minister for Trade
- George Strauss – Shadow Minister of Transport
- Ernest Popplewell – Opposition Deputy Chief Whip in the House of Commons

== January 1958 reshuffle ==
Following the 1957 shadow cabinet election, Gaitskell reshuffled the front bench on 24 January 1958.

- Hugh Gaitskell – Leader of Her Majesty's Most Loyal Opposition and Leader of the Labour Party
- Jim Griffiths – Deputy Leader of the Opposition and Deputy Leader of the Labour Party
- Harold Wilson – Shadow Chancellor of the Exchequer
- Aneurin Bevan – Shadow Foreign Secretary
- Patrick Gordon-Walker – Shadow Home Secretary and Shadow President of the Board of Trade
- James Callaghan – Shadow Secretary of State for the Colonies
- George Brown – Shadow Minister of Defence
- Arthur Bottomley – Shadow Secretary of State for Commonwealth Relations
- Alfred Robens – Shadow Minister for Labour and National Service
- Tony Greenwood – Shadow Minister of Public Buildings and Works
- Dick Mitchison – Shadow Minister of Housing and Local Government
- Frank Soskice – Shadow Attorney General for England and Wales
- Tom Fraser – Shadow Secretary of State for Scotland
- Philip Noel-Baker – Shadow Minister for Foreign Affairs
- Earl Alexander – Leader of the Opposition in the House of Lords
- Herbert Bowden – Opposition Chief Whip in the House of Commons
- Earl of Lucan – Opposition Chief Whip in the House of Lords

=== Junior Shadow Ministers ===
- Tom Williams - Shadow Minister of Agriculture, Fisheries and Food
- Frank Beswick – Shadow Minister of Aviation
- Douglas Jay – Shadow Chief Secretary to the Treasury
- Michael Stewart – Shadow Minister of Education
- Kenneth Younger – Shadow Minister for Foreign Affairs
- Edith Summerskill – Shadow Minister for Health
- Hilary Marquand – Shadow Minister of Pensions and National Insurance
- Harold Neal – Shadow Minister for Power
- Lynn Ungoed-Thomas – Shadow Solicitor General
- John Edwards – Shadow Minister for Trade
- George Strauss – Shadow Minister of Transport
- Ernest Popplewell – Opposition Deputy Chief Whip in the House of Commons

Changes

- November 1958 - George Brown is voted out of the shadow cabinet and is replaced by Summerskill. He remains Shadow Minister of Defence. Lord Faringdon joins as a representative of the Lords.

== 1959 reshuffle ==
Following that year's general, deputy leadership and shadow cabinet elections, Gaitskell performed a major reshuffle on 16 November 1959.

- Hugh Gaitskell – Leader of Her Majesty's Most Loyal Opposition and Leader of the Labour Party
- Aneurin Bevan – Deputy Leader of the Opposition, Deputy Leader of the Labour Party and Shadow Foreign Secretary
- Harold Wilson – Shadow Chancellor of the Exchequer
- Patrick Gordon-Walker – Shadow Home Secretary
- Alfred Robens – Shadow Minister for Labour and National Service
- George Brown – Shadow Minister of Defence
- James Callaghan – Shadow Secretary of State for the Colonies
- Dick Mitchison – Shadow President of the Board of Trade
- Tony Greenwood – Shadow Minister of Education
- Fred Willey – Shadow Minister of Agriculture, Fisheries and Food
- Frederick Lee – Shadow Minister for Power
- Frank Soskice – Shadow Attorney General for England and Wales
- Tom Fraser – Shadow Secretary of State for Scotland
- Earl Alexander – Leader of the Opposition in the House of Lords
- Herbert Bowden – Opposition Chief Whip in the House of Commons
- Earl of Lucan – Opposition Chief Whip in the House of Lords
- Denis Healey – Shadow Minister for Foreign Affairs

=== Junior Shadow Ministers ===
- George Strauss – Shadow Minister of Aviation
- Douglas Jay – Shadow Chief Secretary to the Treasury
- Hilary Marquand – Shadow Secretary of State for Commonwealth Relations
- Edith Summerskill – Shadow Minister for Health
- Michael Stewart – Shadow Minister of Housing and Local Government
- Richard Crossman – Shadow Minister of Pensions and National Insurance
- Douglas Houghton – Shadow Parliamentary Secretary to the Ministry for Pensions and National Insurance
- Barbara Castle – Shadow Minister of Public Buildings and Works
- Eirene White – Shadow Minister of State for Education
- Philip Noel-Baker – Shadow Minister for Foreign Affairs
- Roy Jenkins – Shadow Minister for Trade
- Tony Benn – Shadow Minister of Transport
- Lynn Ungoed-Thomas – Shadow Solicitor General
- Jim Griffiths – Frontbench spokesmen for Wales
- John Taylor – Opposition Deputy Chief Whip in the House of Commons

Changes

- 6 July 1960 – Bevan dies. Healey becomes Shadow Foreign Secretary. The deputy leadership is left vacant until the regular election in November.
- 14 October 1960 – Greenwood resigns following Gaitskell defying the party conference position on nuclear weapons.

== 1960 reshuffle ==
Following the leadership, deputy leadership and shadow cabinet elections, Gaitskell performed another reshuffle on 28 November 1960.

- Hugh Gaitskell – Leader of Her Majesty's Most Loyal Opposition and Leader of the Labour Party
- George Brown – Deputy Leader of the Opposition, Deputy Leader of the Labour Party and Shadow Minister of Defence
- Harold Wilson – Shadow Chancellor of the Exchequer
- Patrick Gordon-Walker – Shadow Home Secretary
- Denis Healey – Shadow Foreign Secretary
- James Callaghan – Shadow Secretary of State for the Colonies
- Frank Soskice – Shadow Attorney General for England and Wales
- Dick Mitchison – Shadow President of the Board of Trade
- Michael Stewart – Shadow Minister of Housing and Local Government
- Tom Fraser – Shadow Secretary of State for Scotland
- Ray Gunter – Shadow Minister for Power
- Douglas Houghton – Shadow Minister of Pensions and National Insurance
- Fred Willey – Shadow Minister of Education
- Frederick Lee – Shadow Minister for Labour and National Service
- Earl Alexander – Leader of the Opposition in the House of Lords
- Herbert Bowden – Opposition Chief Whip in the House of Commons
- Earl of Lucan – Opposition Chief Whip in the House of Lords

=== Junior Shadow Ministers ===
- Geoffrey de Freitas – Shadow Minister of Agriculture, Fisheries and Food
- John Strachey – Shadow Minister of Aviation
- Douglas Jay – Shadow Chief Secretary to the Treasury
- Hilary Marquand – Shadow Secretary of State for Commonwealth Relations
- Eirene White – Shadow Minister of State for Education
- Edith Summerskill – Shadow Minister for Health
- Lynn Ungoed-Thomas – Shadow Solicitor General
- George Strauss – Shadow Minister of Transport
- Jim Griffiths – Frontbench spokesmen for Wales
- John Taylor – Opposition Deputy Chief Whip in the House of Commons

== 1961 reshuffle ==
Following the leadership, deputy leadership and shadow cabinet elections, Gaitskell performed another reshuffle on 30 November 1961.

- Hugh Gaitskell – Leader of Her Majesty's Most Loyal Opposition and Leader of the Labour Party
- George Brown – Deputy Leader of the Opposition, Deputy Leader of the Labour Party and Shadow Home Secretary
- James Callaghan – Shadow Chancellor of the Exchequer
- Harold Wilson – Shadow Foreign Secretary
- Frank Soskice – Shadow Attorney General for England and Wales
- Douglas Houghton – Shadow Minister of Pensions and National Insurance
- Denis Healey – Shadow Secretary of State for the Colonies
- Michael Stewart – Shadow Minister of Housing and Local Government
- Ray Gunter – Shadow Minister for Labour and National Service
- Dick Mitchison – Shadow President of the Board of Trade and Shadow Minister of Public Buildings and Works
- Fred Willey – Shadow Minister of Education
- Tom Fraser – Shadow Minister for Power
- Patrick Gordon-Walker – Shadow Minister of Defence
- Frederick Lee – Shadow Minister of Aviation
- Earl Alexander – Leader of the Opposition in the House of Lords
- Herbert Bowden – Opposition Chief Whip in the House of Commons
- Earl of Lucan – Opposition Chief Whip in the House of Lords

=== Junior Shadow Ministers ===
- Fred Peart – Shadow Minister of Agriculture, Fisheries and Food
- John Strachey – Shadow Secretary of State for Commonwealth Relations
- Kenneth Robinson – Shadow Minister for Health
- Willie Ross – Shadow Secretary of State for Scotland
- Lynn Ungoed-Thomas – Shadow Solicitor General
- George Strauss – Shadow Minister of Transport
- Jim Griffiths – Frontbench spokesmen for Wales
- John Taylor – Opposition Deputy Chief Whip in the House of Commons

== See also ==
- List of British governments
- Official Opposition of the United Kingdom
