= 1958 Labour Party Shadow Cabinet election =

Elections to the Labour Party's Shadow Cabinet (more formally, its "Parliamentary Committee") occurred in November 1958. In addition to the 12 members elected, the Leader (Hugh Gaitskell), Deputy Leader (Jim Griffiths), Labour Chief Whip (Herbert Bowden), Labour Leader in the House of Lords (A. V. Alexander), and Labour Chief Whip in the House of Lords (Lord Lucan) were automatically members.

Labour peers held a separate vote for one further member of the cabinet, won by Lord Faringdon.

In the elections, Edith Summerskill regained her place in the cabinet after a year's absence, at the expense of George Brown. Full results are listed below:

Colour key	Retained in the Shadow Cabinet
Colour key	Joined the Shadow Cabinet
Colour key	Voted out of the Shadow Cabinet

Rank	Candidate	Constituency	Votes
1	Aneurin Bevan	Ebbw Vale	206
2	Harold Wilson	Huyton	191
3	Dick Mitchison	Kettering	183
4	Frank Soskice	Newport	151
5	James Callaghan	Cardiff South East	150
6	Patrick Gordon Walker	Smethwick	149
7	Alfred Robens	Blyth	148
8	Tony Greenwood	Rossendale	133
9	Arthur Bottomley	Rochester and Chatham	127
10	Philip Noel-Baker	Derby South	126
11	Edith Summerskill	Warrington	119
12	Tom Fraser	Hamilton	118
13	Fred Lee	Newton	111
14	Fred Willey	Sunderland North	108
15	George Brown	Belper	90
16	Richard Crossman	Coventry East	87
17	Malcolm Macmillan	Western Isles	81
18	Leslie Hale	Oldham West	80
19	Michael Stewart	Fulham	76
20	Denis Healey	Leeds East	71
21	Frank Beswick	Uxbridge	70
22	Tony Benn	Bristol South East	69
23	Kenneth Younger	Grimsby	67
24	Douglas Jay	Battersea North	60
25	Fred Peart	Workington	53
26	Billy Blyton	Houghton-le-Spring	47
27	Fred Mulley	Sheffield Park	45
28	Arthur Moyle	Oldbury and Halesowen	44
29	Arthur Irvine	Liverpool Edge Hill	40
30	John Dugdale	West Bromwich	36
