= 1962 Labour Party Shadow Cabinet election =

1962 UK election

Elections to the Labour Party's Shadow Cabinet (more formally, its "Parliamentary Committee") occurred in November 1962. In addition to the 12 members elected, the Leader (Hugh Gaitskell), Deputy Leader (George Brown), Labour Chief Whip (Herbert Bowden), Labour Leader in the House of Lords (A. V. Alexander), and Labour Chief Whip in the House of Lords (the Earl of Lucan) were automatically members. The election saw no changes to the Shadow Cabinet.

Colour key	Retained in the Shadow Cabinet
Colour key	Joined the Shadow Cabinet
Colour key	Voted out of the Shadow Cabinet

Rank	Candidate	Constituency	Votes
1	James Callaghan	Cardiff South East	164
2	Frank Soskice	Newport	160
3	Harold Wilson	Huyton	151
4	Douglas Houghton	Sowerby	143
5	Tom Fraser	Hamilton	137
6=	Patrick Gordon Walker	Smethwick	132
6=	Dick Mitchison	Kettering	132
8	Michael Stewart	Fulham	130
9	Denis Healey	Leeds East	129
10	Ray Gunter	Southwark	126
11	Fred Willey	Sunderland North	122
12	Fred Lee	Newton	120
13	Douglas Jay	Battersea North	88
14=	Richard Crossman	Coventry East	74
14=	Anthony Greenwood	Rossendale	74
16	Fred Peart	Workington	72
17	Roy Jenkins	Birmingham Stechford	68
18=	Arthur Bottomley	Middlesbrough East	62
18=	Fenner Brockway	Eton and Slough	62
20=	Alice Bacon	Leeds South East	55
20=	Christopher Mayhew	Woolwich East	55
22=	Barbara Castle	Blackburn	51
22=	Bob Edwards	Bilston	51
24	Judith Hart	Lanark	50
25	George Thomas	Cardiff West	49
26	Leslie Plummer	Deptford	47
27	Malcolm Macmillan	Western Isles	46
28	John Stonehouse	Wednesbury	39
29	Fred Mulley	Sheffield Park	36
30	John Rankin	Glasgow Govan	32
31	Arthur Irvine	Liverpool Edge Hill	19
