= 1960 Labour Party Shadow Cabinet election =

1960 UK election

Elections to the Labour Party's Shadow Cabinet (more formally, its "Parliamentary Committee") occurred in November 1960. In addition to the 12 members elected, the Leader (Hugh Gaitskell), Deputy Leader (George Brown), Labour Chief Whip (Herbert Bowden), Labour Leader in the House of Lords (A. V. Alexander), and Labour Chief Whip in the House of Lords (Lord Faringdon) were automatically members.

Full results are listed below:

| Colour key | Retained in the Shadow Cabinet |
| Colour key | Joined the Shadow Cabinet |
| Colour key | Voted out of the Shadow Cabinet |

| Rank | Candidate | Constituency | Votes |
|---|---|---|---|
| 1 | James Callaghan | Cardiff South East | 159 |
| 2 | Frank Soskice | Newport | 148 |
| 3 | Dick Mitchison | Kettering | 143 |
| 4 | Michael Stewart | Fulham | 141 |
| 5 | Denis Healey | Leeds East | 136 |
| 6 | Tom Fraser | Hamilton | 134 |
| 7 | Ray Gunter | Southwark | 130 |
| 8 | Patrick Gordon Walker | Smethwick | 128 |
| 9 | Harold Wilson | Huyton | 124 |
| 10 | Douglas Houghton | Sowerby | 117 |
| 11 | Fred Willey | Sunderland North | 112 |
| 12 | Fred Lee | Newton | 95 |
| 13 | Tony Benn | Bristol South East | 79 |
| 14 | Lynn Ungoed-Thomas | Leicester North East | 73 |
| 15 | Christopher Mayhew | Woolwich East | 70 |
| 16 | Alice Bacon | Leeds South East | 69 |
| 17 | Billy Blyton | Houghton-le-Spring | 65 |
| 18 | Leslie Plummer | Deptford | 57 |
| 19† | Bob Edwards | Bilston | 55 |
| 19† | John Rankin | Glasgow Govan | 55 |
| 21† | Hilary Marquand | Middlesbrough East | 50 |
| 21† | Victor Yates | Birmingham Ladywood | 50 |
| 23† | Joyce Butler | Wood Green | 49 |
| 23† | John Stonehouse | Wednesbury | 49 |
| 25 | Willie Ross | Kilmarnock | 46 |
| 26 | George Thomas | Cardiff West | 45 |
| 27 | George Craddock | Bradford South | 43 |
| 28 | Fred Peart | Workington | 39 |
| 29† | Bob Mellish | Bermondsey | 37 |
| 29† | Edward Short | Newcastle upon Tyne Central | 37 |
| 31 | George Strauss | Vauxhall | 36 |
| 32 | Reg Prentice | East Ham North | 34 |
| 33† | Frederick Mulley | Sheffield Park | 33 |
| 33† | John Strachey | Dundee West | 33 |
| 35 | Arthur Skeffington | Hayes and Harlington | 26 |
| 36 | Harold Neal | Bolsover | 20 |
| 37 | Gerry Reynolds | Islington North | 16 |
| 38 | William A. Wilkins | Bristol South | 14 |
| 39 | Albert Roberts | Normanton | 13 |
| 40 | Roy Mason | Barnsley | 12 |

† Multiple candidates tied for position.
