= 1963 Labour Party Shadow Cabinet election =

1963 UK election

Elections to the Labour Party's Shadow Cabinet (more formally, its "Parliamentary Committee") occurred in November 1963. In addition to the 12 members elected, the Leader (Harold Wilson), Deputy Leader (George Brown), Labour Chief Whip (Herbert Bowden), Labour Leader in the House of Lords (A. V. Alexander), and Labour Chief Whip in the House of Lords (the Earl of Lucan) were automatically members.

All existing members of the Shadow Cabinet were re-elected. However, as Wilson had succeeded to the leadership of the party, he did not need to stand in the election, and Douglas Jay won the newly available seat.

Colour key	Retained in the Shadow Cabinet
Colour key	Joined the Shadow Cabinet
Colour key	Voted out of the Shadow Cabinet

Rank	Candidate	Constituency	Votes
1	Michael Stewart	Fulham	184
2	James Callaghan	Cardiff South East	175
3	Douglas Houghton	Sowerby	164
4	Frank Soskice	Newport	159
5	Patrick Gordon Walker	Smethwick	156
6	Tom Fraser	Hamilton	146
7	Denis Healey	Leeds East	143
8	Ray Gunter	Southwark	137
9=	Fred Lee	Newton	135
9=	Fred Willey	Sunderland North	135
11	Douglas Jay	Battersea North	135
12	Dick Mitchison	Kettering	123
13	Richard Crossman	Coventry East	102
14	Anthony Greenwood	Rossendale	90
15	Tony Benn	Bristol South East	82
16	Arthur Bottomley	Middlesbrough East	78
17	Elwyn Jones	West Ham South	77
18	Anthony Crosland	Great Grimsby	72
19	Roy Jenkins	Birmingham Stechford	64
20	George Thomas	Cardiff West	58
21	Bob Edwards	Bilston	57
22=	Fenner Brockway	Eton and Slough	55
22=	Barbara Castle	Blackburn	55
24	Reg Prentice	East Ham North	52
25	Judith Hart	Lanark	50
26	Alice Bacon	Leeds South East	46
27	Harold Davies	Leek	42
28	Ben Parkin	Paddington North	40
29	George Thomson	Dundee East	37
