= 1953 Labour Party Shadow Cabinet election =

Elections to the Labour Party's Shadow Cabinet (more formally, its "Parliamentary Committee") occurred in 1953. In addition to the 12 members elected, the Leader (Clement Attlee), Deputy Leader (Herbert Morrison), Labour Chief Whip (William Whiteley), Labour Leader in the House of Lords (William Jowitt) were automatically members. All incumbent members of the Shadow Cabinet retained their seats.

The results of the election are listed below:

Colour key	Retained in the Shadow Cabinet

Rank	Candidate	Constituency	Votes
1	Jim Griffiths	Llanelli	180
2	Hugh Gaitskell	Leeds South	176
3	Frank Soskice	Sheffield, Neepsend	168
4	James Callaghan	Cardiff South-East	160
5	Hugh Dalton	Bishop Auckland	159
6	James Chuter Ede	South Shields	134
7	Edith Summerskill	Fulham West	129
8	Alfred Robens	Blyth	133
9	Aneurin Bevan	Ebbw Vale	126
10	Philip Noel-Baker	Derby South	118
11	Manny Shinwell	Easington	108
12	Glenvil Hall	Colne Valley	106
13	Harold Wilson	Huyton	105
14	Tony Greenwood	Rossendale	89
15	George Strauss	Vauxhall	85
16†	Peggy Herbison	North Lanarkshire	71
16†	John Strachey	Dundee West	71
18	Geoffrey Bing	Hornchurch	63
19	Richard Stokes	Ipswich	59
20	Tony Benn	Bristol South East	58
21	Kenneth Younger	Grimsby	57
22	Malcolm MacMillan	Western Isles	54
23	Walter Monslow	Barrow-in-Furness	51
24	Emrys Hughes	South Ayrshire	50
25†	Arthur Bottomley	Rochester and Chatham	47
25†	Tom Fraser	Hamiltion	47
27	Douglas Jay	Battersea North	46
28	Frederick Lee	Newton	42
29	George Craddock	Bradford South	40
30	Douglas Houghton	Sowerby	35
31	Michael Stewart	Fulham East	33
32†	William Blyton	Houghton-le-Spring	29
32†	Charles Gibson	Clapham	29
34	D. T. Jones	The Hartlepools	17

† Multiple candidates tied for position.
