= 1957 Labour Party Shadow Cabinet election =

Elections to the Labour Party's Shadow Cabinet (more formally, its "Parliamentary Committee") occurred in November 1957. In addition to the 12 members elected, the Leader (Hugh Gaitskell), Deputy Leader (Jim Griffiths), Labour Chief Whip (Herbert Bowden), Labour Leader in the House of Lords (A. V. Alexander) were automatically members.

The results of the election are listed below:

Colour key	Retained in the Shadow Cabinet
Colour key	Joined the Shadow Cabinet
Colour key	Voted out of the Shadow Cabinet

Rank	Candidate	Constituency	Votes
1	Harold Wilson	Huyton	193
2	Dick Mitchison	Kettering	191
3	Aneurin Bevan	Ebbw Vale	181
4	Frank Soskice	Sheffield, Neepsend	174
5	James Callaghan	Cardiff South-East	171
6	Alfred Robens	Blyth	162
7	Tony Greenwood	Rossendale	143
8	Tom Fraser	Hamilton	123
9	George Brown	Belper	119
10	Philip Noel-Baker	Derby South	114
11	Patrick Gordon Walker	Smethwick	105
12	Arthur Bottomley	Rochester and Chatham	99
13†	Fred Lee	Newton	94
13†	Kenneth Younger	Grimsby	94
?	Edith Summerskill	Fulham West	?

† Multiple candidates tied for position.
