= 1959 Labour Party Shadow Cabinet election =

British political party election

Elections to the Labour Party's Shadow Cabinet (more formally, its "Parliamentary Committee") occurred in November 1959. In addition to the 12 members elected, the Leader (Hugh Gaitskell), Deputy Leader (Aneurin Bevan), Labour Chief Whip (Herbert Bowden), Labour Leader in the House of Lords (A. V. Alexander), and Labour Chief Whip in the House of Lords (Lord Faringdon) were automatically members.

Full results are listed below:

Colour key	Retained in the Shadow Cabinet
Colour key	Joined the Shadow Cabinet
Colour key	Voted out of the Shadow Cabinet

Rank	Candidate	Constituency	Votes
1	Harold Wilson	Huyton	167
2	James Callaghan	Cardiff South East	149
3	Frank Soskice	Newport	144
4	Alfred Robens	Blyth	142
5	Fred Lee	Newton	137
6	Tony Greenwood	Rossendale	121
7	Tom Fraser	Hamilton	118
8	George Brown	Belper	106
9	Patrick Gordon Walker	Smethwick	101
10	Dick Mitchison	Kettering	94
11	Fred Willey	Sunderland North	92
12	Denis Healey	Leeds East	90
13	Michael Stewart	Fulham	89
14	Richard Crossman	Coventry East	87
15	Edith Summerskill	Warrington	86
16	Tony Benn	Bristol South East	85
17	Barbara Castle	Blackburn East	76
18	Philip Noel-Baker	Derby South	74
19	Lynn Ungoed-Thomas	Leicester North East	66
20	Leslie Hale	Oldham West	60
21	Malcolm Macmillan	Western Isles	58
22	Billy Blyton	Houghton-le-Spring	54
23	Christopher Mayhew	Woolwich East	52
24	Fred Peart	Workington	51
25	Hilary Marquand	Middlesbrough East	50
26	Frederick Mulley	Sheffield Park	46
27	Bob Edwards	Bilston	45
28	Stephen Swingler	Newcastle-under-Lyme	39
29†	Harold Davies	Leek	38
29†	Konni Zilliacus	Manchester Gorton	38
31	Bob Mellish	Bermondsey	36
32	Charles Pannell	Leeds West	33
33	George Craddock	Bradford South	29
34	Victor Yates	Birmingham Ladywood	28
35	Roy Mason	Barnsley	25
36	George Chetwynd	Stockton-on-Tees	23
37†	Arthur Irvine	Liverpool Edge Hill	22
37†	Ernest Popplewell	Newcastle upon Tyne West	22
39	John Hynd	Sheffield Attercliffe	21
40†	George Rogers	Kensington North	19
40†	Frank Tomney	Hammersmith North	19

† Multiple candidates tied for position.
