= 1955 Labour Party Shadow Cabinet election =

1955 UK election

Elections to the Labour Party's Shadow Cabinet (more formally, its "Parliamentary Committee") occurred in 1955. In addition to the 12 members elected, the Leader (Clement Attlee), Deputy Leader (Herbert Morrison), Labour Chief Whip (William Whiteley), Labour Leader in the House of Lords (William Jowitt) were automatically members.

The 12 winners of the election are listed below:

Colour key	Retained in the Shadow Cabinet
Colour key	Joined the Shadow Cabinet

Rank	Candidate	Constituency	Votes
1	Jim Griffiths	Llanelli	186
2	Hugh Gaitskell	Leeds South	184
3†	James Callaghan	Cardiff South-East	148
3†	Alfred Robens	Blyth	148
5	Harold Wilson	Huyton	147
6	Edith Summerskill	Fulham West	133
7	Aneurin Bevan	Ebbw Vale	118
8	George Brown	Belper	101
9	Philip Noel-Baker	Derby South	100
10	Anthony Greenwood	Rossendale	91
11	Richard Stokes	Ipswich	77
12	Dick Mitchison	Kettering	76
13†	Tom Fraser	Hamilton	75
13†	Kenneth Younger	Grimsby	75
?	John Strachey	Dundee West	52
?	John Rankin	Glasgow Govan	31

† Multiple candidates tied for position.
