= 1961 Labour Party Shadow Cabinet election =

1961 UK election

Elections to the Labour Party's Shadow Cabinet (more formally, its "Parliamentary Committee") occurred in November 1961. In addition to the 12 members elected, the Leader (Hugh Gaitskell), Deputy Leader (George Brown), Labour Chief Whip (Herbert Bowden), Labour Leader in the House of Lords (A. V. Alexander), and Labour Chief Whip in the House of Lords (the Earl of Lucan) were automatically members. The election saw no changes to the Shadow Cabinet.

Colour key	Retained in the Shadow Cabinet
Colour key	Joined the Shadow Cabinet
Colour key	Voted out of the Shadow Cabinet

Rank	Candidate	Constituency	Votes
1	Harold Wilson	Huyton	175
2	Frank Soskice	Newport	174
3	Douglas Houghton	Sowerby	169
4	Denis Healey	Leeds East	161
5	Michael Stewart	Fulham	160
6	Ray Gunter	Southwark	157
7	James Callaghan	Cardiff South East	156
8	Dick Mitchison	Kettering	155
9=	Tom Fraser	Hamilton	153
9=	Fred Willey	Sunderland North	153
11	Patrick Gordon Walker	Smethwick	142
12	Fred Lee	Newton	108
13	Christopher Mayhew	Woolwich East	100
14	Richard Crossman	Coventry East	83
15	Alice Bacon	Leeds South East	78
16	Bob Edwards	Bilston	76
17=	Leslie Hale	Oldham West	72
17=	Lynn Ungoed-Thomas	Leicester North East	72
19	George Thomas	Cardiff West	68
20	Fenner Brockway	Eton and Slough	66
21	Malcolm Macmillan	Western Isles	64
22	Barbara Castle	Blackburn	62
23	Leslie Plummer	Deptford	54
24	Tom Driberg	Barking	53
25	Billy Blyton	Houghton-le-Spring	49
