= 1970 Labour Party Shadow Cabinet election =

1970 UK election

Elections to the Labour Party's Shadow Cabinet (more formally, its "Parliamentary Committee") occurred in July 1970, following the party's defeat in the 1970 general election.

In addition to the 12 members elected, the Leader (Harold Wilson), Deputy Leader (Roy Jenkins), Labour Chief Whip (Bob Mellish), Labour Leader in the House of Lords (Baron Shackleton), and Labour Chief Whip in the Lords (Baron Beswick) were automatically members. The Labour Lords elected one further member, Baron Champion.

The Chair of the Labour Party was elected at the same time as the Shadow Cabinet, and was given a further automatic place in the cabinet. The post was won by Douglas Houghton, who also won one of the twelve places in the Shadow Cabinet election. Ross, who had taken thirteenth place in the Shadow Cabinet election, was given the spare position.

The 12 winners of the election are listed below:

| Colour key | Member of Cabinet when Labour Party lost office following 1970 election |

| Rank | Candidate | Constituency | Votes |
|---|---|---|---|
| 1 | James Callaghan | Cardiff South East | 178 |
| 2 | Denis Healey | Leeds East | 165 |
| 3 | Anthony Crosland | Great Grimsby | 157 |
| 4 | Douglas Houghton | Sowerby | 150 |
| 5 | Tony Benn | Bristol South East | 133 |
| 6 | Michael Foot | Ebbw Vale | 124 |
| 7 | Shirley Williams | Hitchin | 122 |
| 8 | Harold Lever | Manchester Cheetham | 115 |
| 9 | Edward Short | Newcastle upon Tyne Central | 114 |
| 10 | Fred Peart | Workington | 110 |
| 11 | George Thomson | Dundee East | 107 |
| 12 | Barbara Castle | Blackburn | 98 |
| 13 | Willie Ross | Kilmarnock | 93 |
| 14 | Eric Heffer | Liverpool Walton | 78 |
| 15 | Reg Prentice | Daventry | 76 |
| 16= | Richard Marsh | Greenwich | 69 |
| 16= | Elwyn Jones | West Ham South | 69 |
| 18 | Michael Stewart | Fulham | 66 |
| 19 | Ian Mikardo | Poplar | 61 |
| 20 | Cledwyn Hughes | Anglesey | 57 |
| 21 | Willie Hamilton | West Fife | 56 |
| 22 | John Silkin | Deptford | 54 |
| 23 | Douglas Jay | Battersea North | 53 |
| 24 | Roy Mason | Barnsley | 52 |
| 25 | Joan Lestor | Eton and Slough | 48 |
| 26 | Merlyn Rees | Leeds South | 44 |
| 27 | Roy Hattersley | Birmingham Sparkbrook | 43 |
| 28= | George Thomas | Cardiff West | 42 |
| 28= | Bill Rodgers | Stockton-on-Tees | 42 |
| 30 | Dick Taverne | Lincoln | 40 |
| 31 | Peter Shore | Stepney | 39 |
| 32 | Stan Orme | Salford West | 38 |
| 33 | Dickson Mabon | Greenock | 37 |
| 34= | Frank Judd | Portsmouth West | 36 |
| 34= | Tom Driberg | Barking | 36 |
| 36 | Alf Morris | Manchester Wythenshawe | 35 |
| 37 | John Mendelson | Penistone | 34 |
| 38= | Robert Sheldon | Ashton under Lyne | 33 |
| 38= | Hugh Brown | Glasgow Provan | 33 |
| 40 | Fred Mulley | Sheffield Park | 31 |
| 41 | Joel Barnett | Heywood and Royton | 28 |
| 42 | Denis Howell | Birmingham Small Heath | 27 |
| 43 | Joyce Butler | Wood Green | 26 |
| 44= | Harold Walker | Doncaster | 24 |
| 44= | Judith Hart | Lanark | 24 |
| 45 | Lena Jeger | Holborn and St Pancras South | 23 |
| 46 | Alex Lyon | York | 21 |
| 48= | William Molloy | Ealing North | 20 |
| 48= | Thomas Urwin | Houghton-le-Spring | 20 |
| 50 | Arthur Blenkinsop | South Shields | 19 |
| 51 | John Stonehouse | Wednesbury | 14 |
| 52 | Samuel Silkin | Dulwich | 10 |
