= 1952 Labour Party Shadow Cabinet election =

UK political party election

Elections to the Labour Party's Shadow Cabinet (more formally, its "Parliamentary Committee") occurred in November 1952. In addition to the 12 members elected, the Leader (Clement Attlee), Deputy Leader (Herbert Morrison), Labour Chief Whip (William Whiteley), Labour Leader in the House of Lords (William Jowitt) were automatically members.

The results of the election are listed below:

Colour key	Retained in the Shadow Cabinet
Colour key	Joined the Shadow Cabinet
Colour key	Voted out of the Shadow Cabinet

Rank	Candidate	Constituency	Votes
1	Jim Griffiths	Llanelli	194
2	Hugh Gaitskell	Leeds South	179
3	Alfred Robens	Blyth	148
4	James Chuter Ede	South Shields	141
5	Hugh Dalton	Bishop Auckland	140
6	James Callaghan	Cardiff South-East	137
7	Edith Summerskill	Fulham West	130
8	Manny Shinwell	Easington	124
9	Philip Noel-Baker	Derby South	121
10	Glenvil Hall	Colne Valley	113
11	Frank Soskice	Sheffield, Neepsend	111
12	Aneurin Bevan	Ebbw Vale	108
13	Richard Stokes	Ipswich	94
14	Tony Greenwood	Rossendale	93
15	Peggy Herbison	North Lanarkshire	92
16	Harold Wilson	Huyton	91
17	Ronald Williams	Wigan	77
18	Geoffrey Bing	Hornchurch	71
