= 1956 Labour Party Shadow Cabinet election =

UK parliamentary party election

Elections to the Labour Party's Shadow Cabinet (more formally, its "Parliamentary Committee") occurred in November 1956. In addition to the 12 members elected, the Leader (Hugh Gaitskell), Deputy Leader (Jim Griffiths), Labour Chief Whip (Herbert Bowden), Labour Leader in the House of Lords (A. V. Alexander) were automatically members.

The results of the election are listed below:

Colour key	Retained in the Shadow Cabinet
Colour key	Joined the Shadow Cabinet
Colour key	Voted out of the Shadow Cabinet

Rank	Candidate	Constituency	Votes
1	Harold Wilson	Huyton	185
2	Alfred Robens	Blyth	149
3	Aneurin Bevan	Ebbw Vale	148
4	Dick Mitchison	Kettering	146
5	James Callaghan	Cardiff South-East	140
6†	Tony Greenwood	Rossendale	137
6†	Frank Soskice	Sheffield, Neepsend	137
8	Philip Noel-Baker	Derby South	133
9	Edith Summerskill	Fulham West	112
10	George Brown	Belper	110
11	Kenneth Younger	Grimsby	106
12	Tom Fraser	Hamilton	98
13	Arthur Bottomley	Rochester and Chatham	91
14	Lynn Ungoed-Thomas	Leicester North East	90
15	Richard Stokes	Ipswich	69

† Multiple candidates tied for position.
