= 1954 Labour Party Shadow Cabinet election =

Elections to the Labour Party's Shadow Cabinet (more formally, its "Parliamentary Committee") occurred in 1954. In addition to the 12 members elected, the Leader (Clement Attlee), Deputy Leader (Herbert Morrison), Labour Chief Whip (William Whiteley), Labour Leader in the House of Lords (William Jowitt) were automatically members.

The 12 winners of the election are listed below:

Colour key	Retained in the Shadow Cabinet
Colour key	Joined the Shadow Cabinet

Rank	Candidate	Constituency	Votes
1†	Hugh Gaitskell	Leeds South	170
1†	Jim Griffiths	Llanelli	170
3	Frank Soskice	Sheffield, Neepsend	164
4	Hugh Dalton	Bishop Auckland	147
5	Edith Summerskill	Fulham West	142
6	Alfred Robens	Blyth	140
7	Manny Shinwell	Easington	126
8†	Philip Noel-Baker	Derby South	125
8†	James Chuter Ede	South Shields	125
10	James Callaghan	Cardiff South-East	124
11	Glenvil Hall	Colne Valley	121
12	Harold Wilson	Huyton	120
13†	Dick Mitchison	Kettering	95
13†	Tony Greenwood	Wakefield	93
15	George Brown	Belper	93
?	Tony Benn	Bristol South East	
?	Geoffrey Bing	Hornchurch	
?	Fenner Brockway	Eton and Slough	
?	Harold Davies	Leek	
?	Tony Greenwood	Rossendale	
?	Emrys Hughes	South Ayrshire	
?	Walter Monslow	Barrow-in-Furness	
?	John Rankin	Glasgow Tradeston	
?	John Strachey	Dundee West	
?	Arthur Woodburn	Clackmannan and Eastern Stirlingshire	

† Multiple candidates tied for position.
