= 1973 Labour Party Shadow Cabinet election =

UK political party election

Elections to the Labour Party's Shadow Cabinet (more formally, its "Parliamentary Committee") occurred in November 1973. In addition to the 12 members elected, the Leader (Harold Wilson), Deputy Leader (Edward Short), Labour Chief Whip (Bob Mellish), Chairman of the Parliamentary Labour Party (Fred Willey), Labour Leader in the House of Lords (Baron Shackleton), and Labour Chief Whip in the Lords (Baroness Llewelyn-Davies) were automatically members. The Labour Lords elected one further member, Baron Champion.

The 12 winners of the election are listed below:

Colour key	Retained in the Shadow Cabinet
Colour key	Joined the Shadow Cabinet
Colour key	Voted out of the Shadow Cabinet

Rank	Prior rank	Candidate	Constituency	Votes
1	5	Jim Callaghan	Cardiff South East	150
2	4	Michael Foot	Ebbw Vale	147
3	1	Reg Prentice	Daventry	146
4	3	Anthony Crosland	Great Grimsby	145
5	N/A	Roy Jenkins	Birmingham Stechford	144
6	2	Shirley Williams	Hitchin	138
7	6	Denis Healey	Leeds East	129
8=	11	Tony Benn	Bristol South East	110
8=	9	Harold Lever	Manchester Cheetham	110
10	10	Merlyn Rees	Leeds South	108
11	12	Peter Shore	Stepney	104
12	7	Willie Ross	Kilmarnock	99
13	13	John Silkin	Deptford	97
14	8	Fred Peart	Workington	90
15	N/A	Eric Varley	Chesterfield	83
16	14	Cledwyn Hughes	Anglesey	76
17	20	Bill Rodgers	Stockton-on-Tees	67
18	15	Eric Heffer	Liverpool Walton	66
19	22	Stan Orme	Salford West	57
20=	18	Dick Mabon	Greenock	56
20=	24	Norman Atkinson	Tottenham	56
22	26	Brian O'Malley	Rotherham	54
23	N/A	Frank Allaun	Salford East	52
24	21	Roy Hattersley	Birmingham Sparkbrook	50
25	N/A	Edmund Dell	Birkenhead	46
26=	19	Roy Mason	Barnsley	37
26=	27	John Mendelson	Penistone	37
28	N/A	Norman Buchan	West Renfrewshire	36
29	25	Denis Howell	Birmingham Small Heath	31
30	23	Willie Hamilton	West Fife	23
31	29	Ivor Richard	Barons Court	25
32	N/A	Fred Mulley	Sheffield Park	24
33	N/A	Robert Sheldon	Ashton under Lyne	19
