= 1972 Labour Party Shadow Cabinet election =

UK political party election

Elections to the Labour Party's Shadow Cabinet (more formally, its "Parliamentary Committee") occurred in November 1972. In addition to the 12 members elected, the Leader (Harold Wilson), Deputy Leader (Edward Short), Labour Chief Whip (Bob Mellish), Chairman of the Parliamentary Labour Party (Douglas Houghton), Labour Leader in the House of Lords (Baron Shackleton), and Labour Chief Whip in the Lords (Baron Beswick) were automatically members. The Labour Lords elected one further member, Baron Champion.

There was a tie for twelfth place, which required a run-off election between Peter Shore and John Silkin. However, Silkin withdrew, leaving Shore to take the final place in the cabinet, without an election.

The 12 winners of the election are listed below:

Colour key	Retained in the Shadow Cabinet
Colour key	Joined the Shadow Cabinet
Colour key	Voted out of the Shadow Cabinet

Rank	Prior rank	Candidate	Constituency	Votes
1=	13	Reg Prentice	Daventry	154
1=	3	Shirley Williams	Hitchin	154
3	8	Anthony Crosland	Great Grimsby	148
4	2	Michael Foot	Ebbw Vale	146
5	4	Jim Callaghan	Cardiff South East	142
6	12	Denis Healey	Leeds East	137
7	5	Willie Ross	Kilmarnock	134
8	6	Fred Peart	Workington	128
9	7	Harold Lever	Manchester Cheetham	125
10	25	Merlyn Rees	Leeds South	107
11	10	Tony Benn	Bristol South East	106
12=	11	Peter Shore	Stepney	102
12=	14	John Silkin	Deptford	102
14	17	Cledwyn Hughes	Anglesey	91
15	16	Eric Heffer	Liverpool Walton	84
16	15	Barbara Castle	Blackburn	78
17	26	George Thomas	Cardiff West	73
18=	19	Dick Mabon	Greenock	71
18=	20	Roy Mason	Barnsley	71
18=	18	Bill Rodgers	Stockton-on-Tees	71
21	N/A	Roy Hattersley	Birmingham Sparkbrook	68
22	24	Stan Orme	Salford West	65
23	22	Willie Hamilton	West Fife	57
24	N/A	Norman Atkinson	Tottenham	54
25	N/A	Denis Howell	Birmingham Small Heath	53
26	N/A	Brian O'Malley	Rotherham	46
27	N/A	John Mendelson	Penistone	45
28	N/A	Alf Morris	Manchester Wythenshawe	42
29	N/A	Ivor Richard	Barons Court	40
30	N/A	Arthur Palmer	Bristol Central	31
31	N/A	John Morris	Aberavon	18
