= 1980 Labour Party Shadow Cabinet election =

Political party election in the United Kingdom

Elections to the Labour Party's Shadow Cabinet (more formally, its "Parliamentary Committee") took place on 4 December 1980, having been delayed due to the October election of new Party Leader Michael Foot. In addition to the 12 members elected, the Leader (Foot), Deputy Leader (Denis Healey), Labour Chief Whip (Michael Cocks), Labour Leader in the House of Lords (Lord Peart), and Chairman of the Parliamentary Labour Party (Fred Willey) were automatically members.

Two winners of the 1979 election were not re-elected: Healey was elected Deputy Leader of the Labour Party, so did not need to run for election to the Shadow Cabinet. David Owen did not return. He informed Michael Foot of his decision not to run in November, after the PLP rejected "one member, one vote" and it became clearer to him that he would be defecting. Not long afterward, he joined Bill Rodgers (who did win a seat in the Shadow Cabinet), Shirley Williams, and Roy Jenkins in founding the Social Democratic Party. Because of Rodgers's defection, Tony Benn joined the Shadow Cabinet in January 1981 by virtue of being the top loser.

The 12 winners of the election are listed below:

Colour key	Retained in the Shadow Cabinet
Colour key	Joined the Shadow Cabinet

Rank	Prior rank	Candidate	Constituency	Votes
1	4	Roy Hattersley	Birmingham Sparkbrook	143
2	5	Eric Varley	Chesterfield	141
3	–	Gerald Kaufman	Manchester Ardwick	139
4†	9	Merlyn Rees	Leeds South	125
4†	3	Peter Shore	Stepney and Poplar	125
6	6	Stan Orme	Salford West	119
7	2	John Silkin	Lewisham Deptford	118
8†	7	Albert Booth	Barrow and Furness	116
8†	8	Bill Rodgers	Stockton-on-Tees	116
10	11	Roy Mason	Barnsley	114
11	12	John Smith	North Lanarkshire	112
12	?	Neil Kinnock	Bedwellty	90
13	?	Tony Benn	Bristol South East	88
14	?	Bruce Millan	Glasgow Craigton	82
15	?	Brynmor John	Pontypridd	80
16	?	Eric Heffer	Liverpool Walton	71
17	?	Denis Howell	Birmingham Small Heath	69
18	?	Norman Buchan	West Renfrewshire	67
19	?	Dickson Mabon	Greenock and Port Glasgow	63
20	?	Tam Dalyell	West Lothian	?
?	?	Peter Archer	Warley West	57
?	?	Robin Cook	Edinburgh Central	56
?	?	Gwyneth Dunwoody	Crewe	28
