= 1971 Labour Party Shadow Cabinet election =

1971 UK election

Elections to the Labour Party's Shadow Cabinet (more formally, its "Parliamentary Committee") occurred in December 1971. In addition to the 12 members elected, the Leader (Harold Wilson), Deputy Leader (Roy Jenkins), Labour Chief Whip (Bob Mellish), Chairman of the Parliamentary Labour Party (Douglas Houghton), Labour Leader in the House of Lords (Baron Shackleton), and Labour Chief Whip in the Lords (Baron Beswick) were automatically members. The Labour Lords elected one further member, Baron Champion.

Lever and Thomson both resigned in April 1972, and were replaced by Prentice and Silkin, the first two unsuccessful candidates. Jenkins resigned as deputy leader in the same month, and was replaced by Edward Short. This created an additional vacancy, and because the next two unsuccessful candidates had tied on votes, a run-off election was held to decide who would join the shadow cabinet. On 3 May, Barbara Castle defeated Eric Heffer by 111 votes to 89, to take the position.

The 12 winners of the election are listed below:

Colour key	Retained in the Shadow Cabinet
Colour key	Joined the Shadow Cabinet
Colour key	Voted out of the Shadow Cabinet

Rank	Prior rank	Candidate	Constituency	Votes
1	9	Edward Short	Newcastle upon Tyne Central	145
2	6	Michael Foot	Ebbw Vale	144
3	7	Shirley Williams	Hitchin	137
4	1	James Callaghan	Cardiff South East	134
5	13	Willie Ross	Kilmarnock	133
6	10	Fred Peart	Workington	130
7	8	Harold Lever	Manchester Cheetham	129
8	3	Anthony Crosland	Great Grimsby	128
9	11	George Thomson	Dundee East	126
10	5	Tony Benn	Bristol South East	122
11	31	Peter Shore	Stepney	105
12	2	Denis Healey	Leeds East	104
13	15	Reg Prentice	Daventry	95
14	22	John Silkin	Deptford	94
15=	12	Barbara Castle	Blackburn	91
15=	14	Eric Heffer	Liverpool Walton	91
17	20	Cledwyn Hughes	Anglesey	81
18	29	Bill Rodgers	Stockton-on-Tees	80
19	33	Dickson Mabon	Greenock	79
20	24	Roy Mason	Barnsley	78
21	23	Douglas Jay	Battersea North	72
22	21	Willie Hamilton	West Fife	64
23	19	Ian Mikardo	Poplar	63
24	32	Stan Orme	Salford West	56
25	26	Merlyn Rees	Leeds South	54
26	28	George Thomas	Cardiff West	51
27	25	Joan Lestor	Eton and Slough	42
28	N/A	Raymond Fletcher	Ilkeston	37
29	45	Judith Hart	Lanark	19
30	N/A	Reg Freeson	Willesden East	17
31	N/A	William Hamling	Woolwich West	16
32	48	William Molloy	Ealing North	7
33	51	John Stonehouse	Wednesbury	6
