= 1987 Labour Party Shadow Cabinet election =

1987 British election

The annual election to the Labour Party's Shadow Cabinet (more formally, its "Parliamentary Committee") was conducted in 1987. In addition to the 16 members elected, the Leader (Neil Kinnock), Deputy Leader (Roy Hattersley), Labour Chief Whip (Derek Foster), Labour Leader in the House of Lords (Cledwyn Hughes), and Chairman of the Parliamentary Labour Party (Stan Orme) were automatically members.

Following the 1987 general election, there were significant changes to the cabinet. Barry Jones, Peter Shore, Peter Archer and Giles Radice lost their seats, and other familiar faces such as Denis Healey did not stand. Michael Meacher, Robert Hughes, Robin Cook, Frank Dobson, Gordon Brown, Jo Richardson and Jack Straw gained seats.

Rank	Prior rank	Candidate	Constituency	Votes
1	15	Bryan Gould	Dagenham	163
2	12=	John Prescott	Kingston upon Hull East	130
3	16	Michael Meacher	Oldham West	127
4	1	Gerald Kaufman	Manchester Gorton	115
5	2	John Smith	Monklands East	113
6	3	Denzil Davies	Llanelli	111
7	17=	Robert Hughes	Aberdeen North	106
8	17=	Robin Cook	Livingston	95
9	14	Donald Dewar	Glasgow Garscadden	93
10		Frank Dobson	Holborn and St Pancras	91
11=		Gordon Brown	Dunfermline East	88
11=	9	Jack Cunningham	Copeland	88
11=		Jo Richardson	Barking	88
14	12=	David Clark	South Shields	87
15		Jack Straw	Blackburn	86
16	6	Barry Jones	Alyn and Deeside	78
17		Tony Blair	Sedgefield	71
18		Tony Benn	Chesterfield	69

== Footnotes ==
Notes
