= 1991 Labour Party Shadow Cabinet election =

United Kingdom election

Elections to the Labour Party's Shadow Cabinet took place on 23 October 1991. Under the rules then in effect, the Commons members of the Parliamentary Labour Party elected 18 members of the Official Opposition Shadow Cabinet, who were then assigned portfolios by the leader. The Commons members of the PLP separately elected the Chief Whip, and the Labour peers elected the Leader of the Opposition in the House of Lords. In addition, the Leader of the Labour Party and Deputy Leader (Neil Kinnock and Roy Hattersley, respectively) were members by virtue of those offices.

The election did not result in any changes to the Shadow Cabinet.

Rank	Candidate	Constituency	Votes
1	Gordon Brown	Dunfermline East	150
2	Robin Cook	Livingston	149
3	John Smith	Monklands East	141
4	Ann Clwyd	Cynon Valley	137
5	Bryan Gould	Dagenham	136
6†	Margaret Beckett	Derby South	134
6†	Frank Dobson	Holborn and St Pancras	134
8	Tony Blair	Sedgefield	132
9	Ann Taylor	Dewsbury	126
10†	David Clark	South Shields	122
10†	Donald Dewar	Glasgow Garscadden	122
12†	Jack Cunningham	Copeland	121
12†	Gerald Kaufman	Manchester Gorton	121
14	Jack Straw	Blackburn	119
15†	Michael Meacher	Oldham West	118
15†	John Prescott	Kingston upon Hull East	118
17	Barry Jones	Alyn and Deeside	113
18	Jo Richardson	Barking	107
19	Martin O'Neill	Clackmannan	88
20	Ron Davies	Caerphilly	83
21	Joan Lestor	Eccles	72
22	Llin Golding	Newcastle-under-Lyme	61
23	Kevin McNamara	Kingston upon Hull North	59
24	Gavin Strang	Edinburgh East	50
25	George Robertson	Hamilton	48
26†	Harriet Harman	Peckham	45
26†	Clare Short	Birmingham Ladywood	45
28	Tony Banks	Newham North West	41
29	Mildred Gordon	Bow and Poplar	40
30	Tony Benn	Chesterfield	39
31	Dennis Canavan	Falkirk West	35
32†	Barry Sheerman	Huddersfield	32
32†	Chris Smith	Islington South and Finsbury	32
34	Clive Soley	Hammersmith	31
35	Bernie Grant	Tottenham	30
36	Bob Cryer	Bradford South	29
37	Tam Dalyell	Linlithgow	26
38	Keith Vaz	Leicester East	22

† Multiple candidates tied for position.
