= 1990 Labour Party Shadow Cabinet election =

1990 election in the United Kingdom

Elections to the Labour Party's Shadow Cabinet took place on 24 October 1990. Under the rules then in effect, the Commons members of the Parliamentary Labour Party elected 18 members of the Official Opposition Shadow Cabinet, who were then assigned portfolios by the leader. The Commons members of the PLP separately elected the Chief Whip, and the Labour peers elected the Leader of the Opposition in the House of Lords. In addition, the Leader of the Labour Party and Deputy Leader (Neil Kinnock and Roy Hattersley, respectively) were members by virtue of those offices.

As a result of the election, Joan Lestor lost her seat in the Shadow Cabinet, and was replaced by Ann Taylor; all other members were re-elected.

Colour key	Retained in the Shadow Cabinet
Colour key	Joined the Shadow Cabinet
Colour key	Voted out of the Shadow Cabinet

Rank	Candidate	Constituency	Votes
1	John Smith	Monklands East	141
2	Gordon Brown	Dunfermline East	138
3	Margaret Beckett	Derby South	133
4	Robin Cook	Livingston	125
5	Gerald Kaufman	Manchester Gorton	121
6	Jack Straw	Blackburn	119
7	David Clark	South Shields	118
8†	Tony Blair	Sedgefield	115
8†	Donald Dewar	Glasgow Garscadden	115
10	Michael Meacher	Oldham West	111
11	Ann Clwyd	Cynon Valley	102
12	Ann Taylor	Dewsbury	100
13†	Jack Cunningham	Copeland	99
13†	Barry Jones	Alyn and Deeside	99
15	Jo Richardson	Barking	97
16	Frank Dobson	Holborn and St Pancras	96
17	Bryan Gould	Dagenham	94
18	John Prescott	Kingston upon Hull East	85
19	Joan Lestor	Eccles	78
20	Harriet Harman	Peckham	68
21	Martin O'Neill	Clackmannan	65
22	Clare Short	Birmingham Ladywood	65
23	Ron Davies	Caerphilly	58
24	George Robertson	Hamilton	57
	Llin Golding	Newcastle-under-Lyme	53
	David Blunkett	Sheffield Brightside	51
	Kevin McNamara	Kingston upon Hull North	50
	Tony Banks	Newham North West	49
	Clive Soley	Hammersmith	48
	Mildred Gordon	Bow and Poplar	45
	Tony Benn	Chesterfield	42
	Tam Dalyell	Linlithgow	42
	Barry Sheerman	Huddersfield	42
	Gavin Strang	Edinburgh East	42
	Bernie Grant	Tottenham	35
	Bob Cryer	Bradford South	30
	Dennis Canavan	Falkirk West	28
	Chris Smith	Islington South and Finsbury	28

† Multiple candidates tied for position.
