= 1979 Labour Party Shadow Cabinet election =

UK political party election

Elections to the Labour Party's Shadow Cabinet (more formally, its "Parliamentary Committee") occurred on 14 June 1979, following the Party's fall from power at the May general election that year. In addition to the 12 members elected, the Leader (James Callaghan), Deputy Leader (Michael Foot), Labour Chief Whip (Michael Cocks), Labour Leader in the House of Lords (Lord Peart), and Chairman of the Parliamentary Labour Party (Fred Willey) were automatically members.

Tony Benn, who had been Secretary of State for Energy in the outgoing Callaghan ministry did not seek election to the Shadow Cabinet as he opted to return to the back benches "for the time being".

The 12 winners of the election are listed below:

Rank	Candidate	Constituency	Votes
1	Denis Healey	Leeds East	153
2	John Silkin	Lewisham Deptford	148
3	Peter Shore	Stepney and Poplar	136
4	Roy Hattersley	Birmingham Sparkbrook	133
5	Eric Varley	Chesterfield	129
6	Stan Orme	Salford West	128
7	Albert Booth	Barrow and Furness	122
8	Bill Rodgers	Stockton-on-Tees	112
9	Merlyn Rees	Leeds South	110
10	David Owen	Plymouth Devonport	101
11	Roy Mason	Barnsley	98
12	John Smith	North Lanarkshire	88
