= Minister of Materials =

UK government ministry

The Minister of Materials was a short-lived ministerial office in the Government of the United Kingdom, in charge of the Ministry of Materials. Created on 6 July 1951, the office was wound up on 16 August 1954. Most of its holders also held another ministerial office.

The establishment of the Ministry was set out in command paper Cmd. 8278 "Ministry of Materials", presented to Parliament in June 1951.

== Office-holders ==
- 1951: Richard Stokes (also Lord Privy Seal)
- 1951: Philip Cunliffe-Lister, 1st Viscount Swinton (also Chancellor of the Duchy of Lancaster)
- 1952: Sir Arthur Salter
- 1953: Frederick Marquis, 1st Viscount Woolton (also Chancellor of the Duchy of Lancaster)
