= Shadow Secretary of State for Energy Security and Net Zero =

Post in the Official Opposition Shadow Cabinet

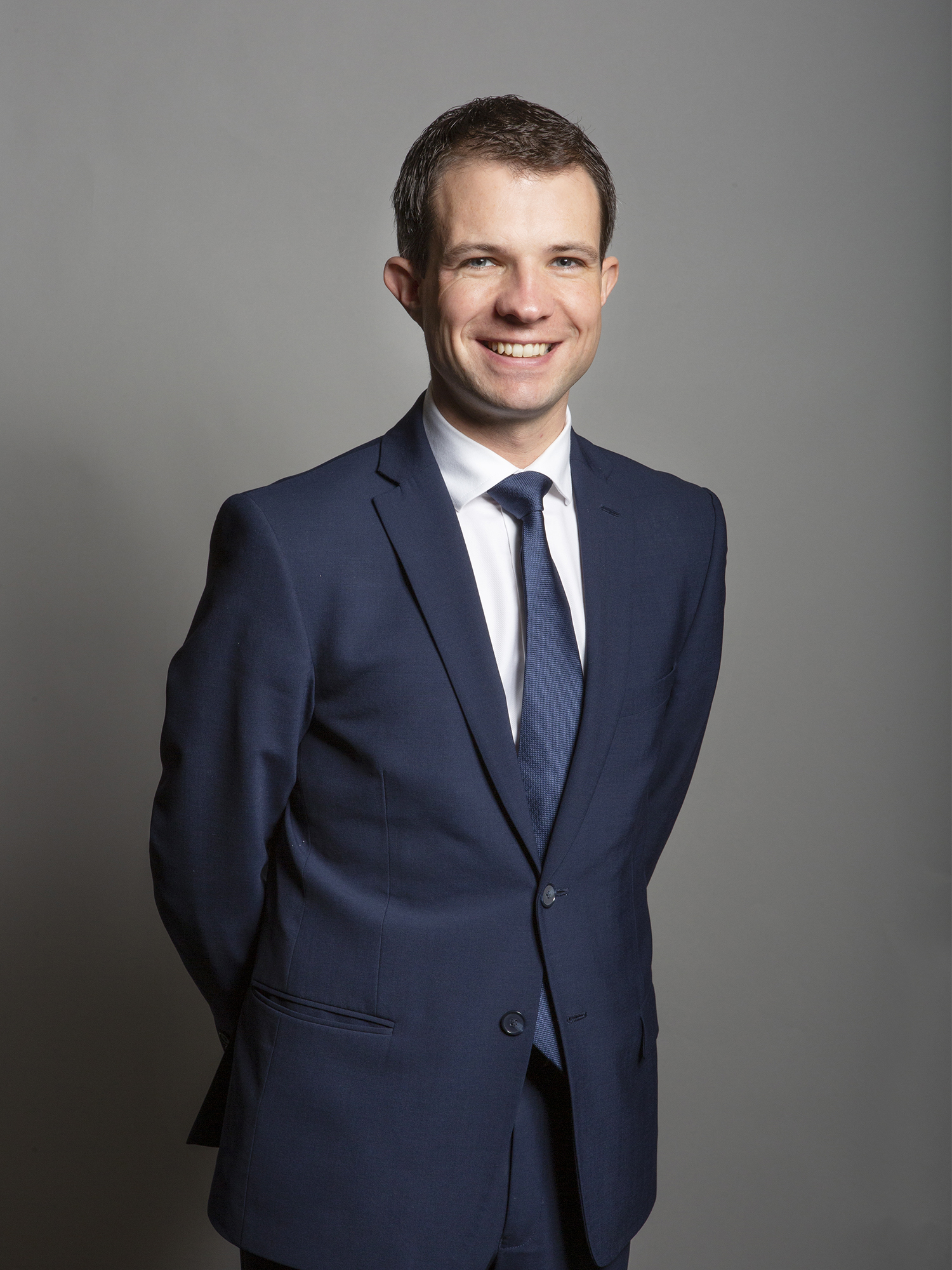
- Incumbent; Andrew Bowie since 31 August 2026
- Appointer: Leader of the Opposition

The shadow secretary of state for energy security and net zero is a post in the Official Opposition Shadow Cabinet. The shadow secretary originally helped hold the secretary of state for energy and climate change and junior ministers to account and is the lead spokesperson on energy and climate change issues for their party. The post currently holds the secretary of state for energy security and net zero to account in Parliament.

A previous Official Opposition post of shadow secretary of state for energy existed until the Department of Energy was merged into the Department of Trade and Industry (DTI) in 1992. In 2008, the Department for Energy and Climate Change was split from the DTI's successor department, effectively reviving the former department and the need for an Opposition shadow.

Following Theresa May's appointment as Prime Minister in July 2016, the department was disbanded and merged with the Department for Business, Innovation and Skills to form the Department for Business, Energy and Industrial Strategy, with the consequent ending of this shadow post.

It was revived during the Starmer shadow cabinet and given to Ed Miliband, the former Labour leader, who was then serving as Shadow Secretary of State for Business, Energy and Industrial Strategy before his appointment.

== List of shadow secretaries for energy ==
=== Shadow Minister for Power ===
Name	Took office	Left office	Political party	Shadow Cabinet
Philip Noel-Baker	15 July 1955	27 November 1956	Labour	Attlee
Philip Noel-Baker	15 July 1955	27 November 1956	Labour	Gaitskell
Harold Neal	27 November 1956	November 1959	Labour	Gaitskell
Frederick Lee	November 1959	November 1960	Labour	Gaitskell
Ray Gunter	November 1960	6 December 1961	Labour	Gaitskell
Tom Fraser	6 December 1961	16 October 1964	Labour	Gaitskell
Tom Fraser	6 December 1961	16 October 1964	Labour	Brown
Tom Fraser	6 December 1961	16 October 1964	Labour	Wilson
Frederick Erroll	16 October 1964	29 October 1964	Conservative	Douglas-Home
John Peyton	29 October 1964	19 April 1966	Conservative	Douglas-Home
John Peyton	29 October 1964	19 April 1966	Conservative	Heath
Anthony Barber	19 April 1966	23 February 1967	Conservative	Heath
Keith Joseph	23 February 1967	10 October 1967	Conservative	Heath
Margaret Thatcher	10 October 1967	14 November 1968	Conservative	Heath
John Eden	14 November 1968	19 June 1970	Conservative	Heath
=== Shadow Minister for Fuel and Power ===
Name	Took office	Left office	Political party	Shadow Cabinet
Michael Foot	22 July 1970	16 December 1971	Labour	Wilson II
Harold Lever	16 December 1971	11 April 1972	Labour	Wilson II
Eric Varley	11 April 1972	4 March 1974	Labour	Wilson II
=== Shadow Secretary of State for Energy ===
Name	Took office	Left office	Political party	Shadow Cabinet
Patrick Jenkin	12 March 1974	15 January 1976	Conservative	Heath II
Patrick Jenkin	12 March 1974	15 January 1976	Conservative	Thatcher
John Biffen	15 January 1976	19 November 1976	Conservative	Thatcher
Tom King	19 November 1976	4 May 1979	Conservative	Thatcher
Tony Benn	4 May 1979	14 June 1979	Labour	Callaghan
David Owen	14 June 1979	4 November 1980	Labour	Callaghan
Merlyn Rees	4 November 1980	24 November 1982	Labour	Michael Foot
John Smith	24 November 1982	2 October 1983	Labour	Michael Foot
Stan Orme	2 October 1983	13 July 1987	Labour	Kinnock
John Prescott	13 July 1987	23 November 1988	Labour	Kinnock
Tony Blair	23 November 1988	2 November 1989	Labour	Kinnock
Frank Dobson	2 November 1989	18 July 1992	Labour	Kinnock
=== Shadow Secretary of State for Energy and Climate Change ===
Name	Took office	Left office	Political party	Shadow Cabinet
Greg Clark	6 October 2008	11 May 2010	Conservative	Cameron
Ed Miliband	11 May 2010	8 October 2010	Labour	Harman
Meg Hillier	8 October 2010	7 October 2011	Labour	Miliband
Caroline Flint	7 October 2011	14 September 2015	Labour	Miliband
Caroline Flint	7 October 2011	14 September 2015	Labour	Miliband; Harman II
Lisa Nandy	14 September 2015	27 June 2016	Labour	Corbyn
Barry Gardiner	27 June 2016	8 October 2016	Labour	Corbyn
=== Shadow Secretary of State for Business, Energy and Industrial Strategy ===
Clive Lewis	6 October 2016	8 February 2017	Labour	Corbyn
Rebecca Long-Bailey	9 February 2017	6 April 2020	Labour	Corbyn
Ed Miliband	6 April 2020	29 November 2021	Labour	Starmer
=== Shadow Secretary of State for Climate Change and Net Zero ===
Name	Took office	Left office	Political party	Shadow Cabinet
Ed Miliband	29 November 2021	4 September 2023	Labour	Starmer
=== Shadow Secretary of State for Energy Security and Net Zero ===
Name	Took office	Left office	Political party	Shadow Cabinet
Ed Miliband	4 September 2023	5 July 2024	Labour	Starmer
Claire Coutinho	8 July 2024	31 August 2026	Conservative	Sunak; Badenoch
Andrew Bowie	31 August 2026	incumbent	Conservative	Badenoch

== See also ==
- Official Opposition frontbench
