= Parliamentary Peace Aims Group =

The Parliamentary Peace Aims Group was a group of British Labour MPs during the Second World War that wanted a negotiated peace. It was organised by Richard Stokes.

Its Memorandum of Peace Aims was published in November 1939 in the Daily Herald and was supported by over 70 Constituency Labour Parties. Richard Stokes narrowly failed to get elected as a constituency representative to the Labour National Executive Committee in 1941.

== Membership ==
Members of the group were:

- James Barr
- George Buchanan
- William Cove
- Rhys Davies
- Agnes Hardie
- David Kirkwood
- George Lansbury
- William Leonard
- H. G. McGhee
- Neil MacLean
- Malcolm Macmillan
- George Mathers
- Fred Messer
- Alfred Salter
- Reg Sorensen
- Richard Stokes
- Cecil Wilson
