= 1960 Labour Party deputy leadership election =

Election after the death of Aneurin Bevan

- 3–10 November 1960
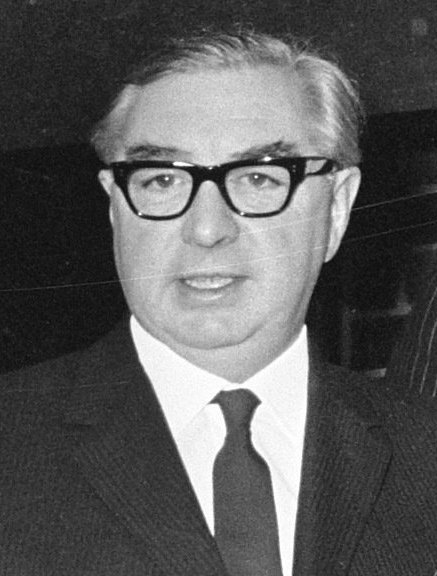

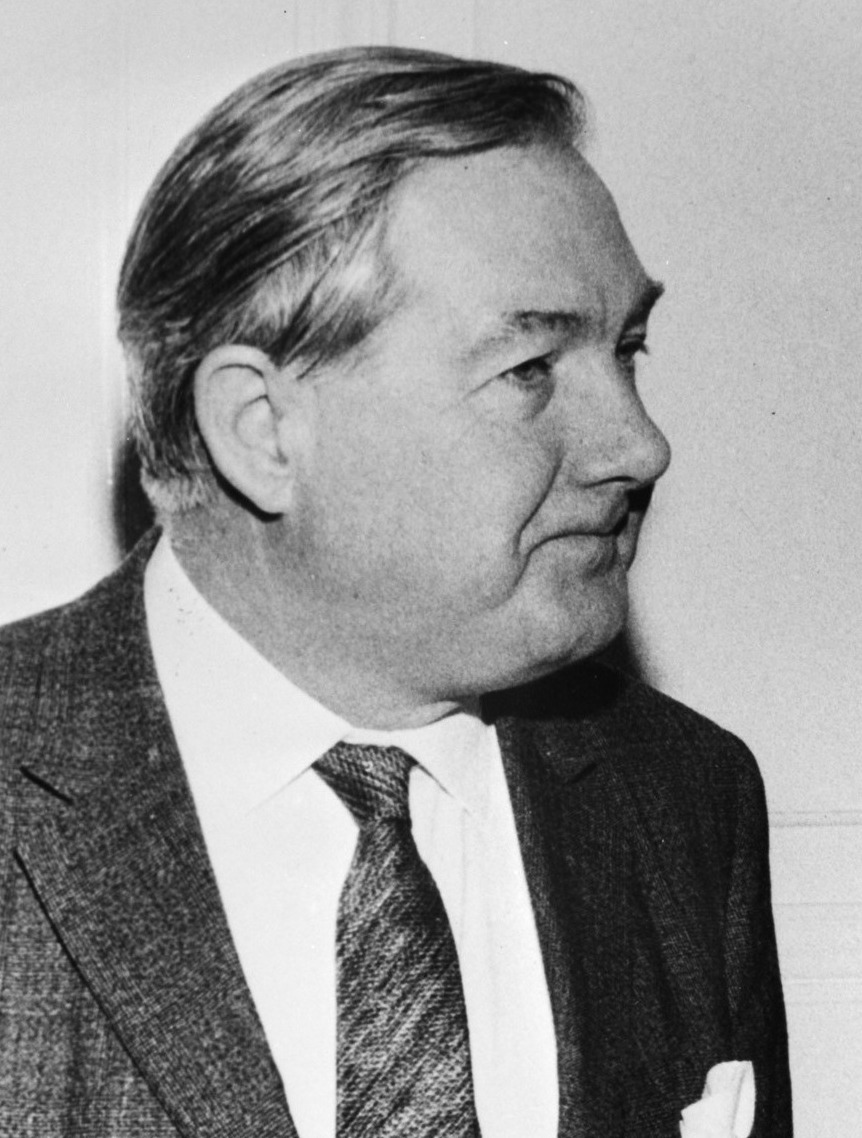
Candidate	George Brown	Frederick Lee	James Callaghan
First ballot	118 (48.0%)	73 (29.7%)	55 (22.4%)
Second ballot	146 (63.8%)	83 (36.2%)	Eliminated
Deputy Leader before election
Aneurin Bevan
Elected Deputy Leader
George Brown

The 1960 Labour Party deputy leadership election took place in November 1960, following the death of sitting deputy leader Aneurin Bevan.

== Candidates ==
- George Brown, Shadow Minister of Defence, Member of Parliament for Belper
- James Callaghan, Shadow Secretary of State for the Colonies, Member of Parliament for Cardiff South East
- Frederick Lee, Shadow Minister for Power, Member of Parliament for Newton

The ballot coincided with a leadership election, where leader Hugh Gaitskell saw off left-wing challenger Harold Wilson. In the deputy leadership election, Brown and Callaghan both supported Gaitskell, while Lee was aligned with the left wing of the party.

== Results ==
First ballot: 3 November 1960
Candidate	Votes	%
George Brown	118	48.0
Frederick Lee	73	29.7
James Callaghan	55	22.4
Second ballot required

As a result of the first round, Callaghan was eliminated. The remaining two candidates faced each other in a second round.

Second ballot: 10 November 1960
Candidate	Votes	%
George Brown	146	63.8
Frederick Lee	83	36.2
George Brown elected

== Sources ==
- http://privatewww.essex.ac.uk/~tquinn/labour_party_deputy.htm
