= 1961 Labour Party deputy leadership election =

UK political party election

- 12 November 1961
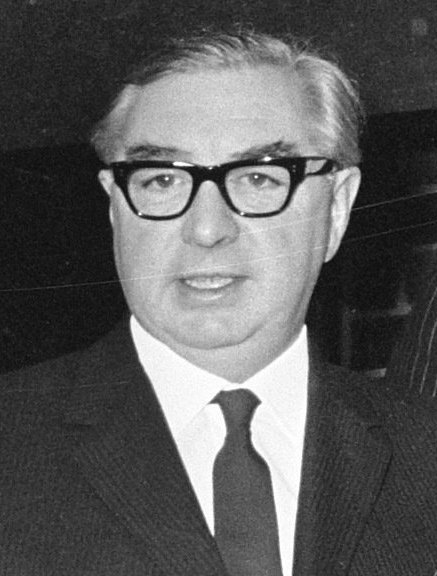

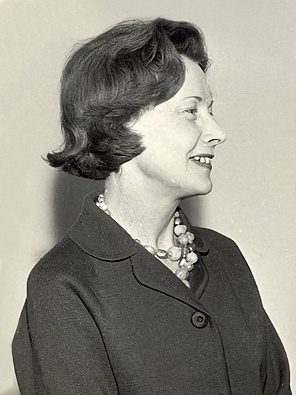
Candidate	George Brown	Barbara Castle
Popular vote	169	56
Percentage	75.1%	24.9%
Deputy Leader before election
George Brown
Elected Deputy Leader
George Brown

The 1961 Labour Party deputy leadership election took place on 12 November 1961, after sitting deputy leader George Brown was challenged by Barbara Castle, who became the first woman to run for either leader or deputy leader of the Labour Party.

== Candidates ==
- George Brown, incumbent Deputy Leader of the Labour Party, Member of Parliament for Belper
- Barbara Castle, Shadow Minister of Public Buildings and Works, Member of Parliament for Blackburn

== Results ==
Only ballot: 12 November 1961
Candidate	Votes	%
George Brown	169	75.1
Barbara Castle	56	24.9
George Brown re-elected

== Sources ==
- http://privatewww.essex.ac.uk/~tquinn/labour_party_deputy.htm

== See also ==
- 1961 Labour Party leadership election
