= Richard Stokes (politician) =

British politician (1897–1957)

Major The Right Honourable Richard Stokes MC
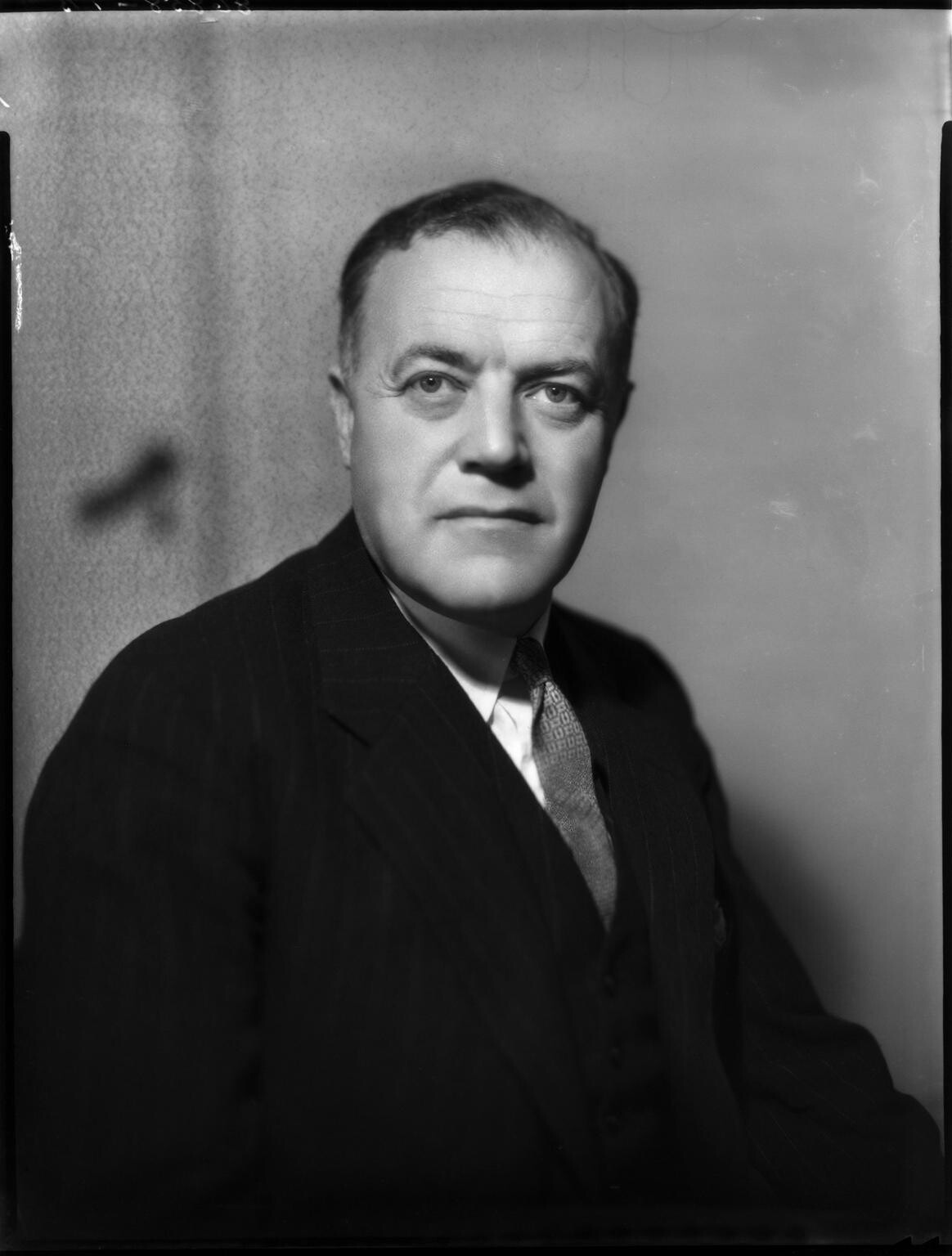
- Stokes in 1940

Shadow Minister of Defence
- In office 15 July 1955 – 30 November 1956
- Leader: Clement Attlee; Hugh Gaitskell
- Succeeded by: George Brown

Minister of Materials
- In office 6 July 1951 – 26 October 1951
- Prime Minister: Clement Attlee
- Preceded by: Office established
- Succeeded by: Viscount Swinton

Lord Keeper of the Privy Seal
- In office 26 April 1951 – 26 October 1951
- Prime Minister: Clement Attlee
- Preceded by: Ernest Bevin
- Succeeded by: The Marquess of Salisbury

Minister of Works
- In office 28 February 1950 – 26 April 1951
- Prime Minister: Clement Attlee
- Preceded by: Charles Key
- Succeeded by: George Brown

Member of Parliament for Ipswich
- In office 16 February 1938 – 3 August 1957
- Preceded by: John Ganzoni
- Succeeded by: Dingle Foot

Personal details
- Born: Richard Rapier Stokes; 27 January 1897
- Died: 3 August 1957 (aged 60) London, UK
- Party: Labour
- Relations: Wilfred Stokes, Leonard Stokes (Uncles)
- Parent(s): Philip Folliott Stokes; Mary Fenwick Rapier
- Education: Trinity College, Cambridge

Richard Rapier Stokes, MC (27 January 1897 – 3 August 1957) was a British soldier and Labour politician who served briefly as Lord Privy Seal in 1951. Though he held office under Labour governments he was said to have remained a backbencher at heart, and was noted for his independence in parliament.

== Early life and family ==
The second son of Philip Folliott Stokes, a barrister, and his wife Mary Fenwick Rapier, the only surviving child of Richard Christopher Rapier (1836–1897) of Ransomes & Rapier, Richard Stokes was educated at Downside School and the Royal Military Academy, Woolwich, before serving in the Royal Artillery during the latter stages of World War I, winning the Military Cross and bar and the Croix de Guerre. After the war was over, he studied mechanical sciences (engineering) at Trinity College, Cambridge, where he won a rugby blue.

His uncle Sir Wilfred Stokes, chairman and managing director of the engineering firm Ransomes & Rapier invented the Stokes Mortar in World War I. His uncle Leonard Stokes was an architect who designed the new buildings at Downside School (built 1912, when Richard was at Downside). Another uncle was the landscape painter Adrian Scott Stokes.

Richard Stokes was the maternal uncle of Katharine Hull, co-author of The Far Distant Oxus and its sequels, and was also a good friend of author Arthur Ransome, who helped with the books' publication.

Richards son Jonathan, was an established engineer and enviromental campaigner, one of the first to campaign for climate change.

== Business career ==
On going down from Cambridge, Stokes joined his family's business, Ransomes & Rapier, and was made managing director at the age of 30. When rearmament was proposed by the National Government he offered to charge the nation cost price for all his firm's rearmament work, although it was rejected by the National Government – a rejection he criticised in his maiden speech after being elected to parliament.

== Prewar political career ==
Stokes was chairman (1939) and supporter of the School of Economic Science, an economics study group that expounded the economic theories of the American economist Henry George, in particular George's advocacy of land value taxation. Along with Andrew MacLaren (the co-founder of the School of Economic Science) and George Lansbury, both fellow supporters of land value taxation, he co-wrote a paper analysing the economic forces menacing peace in Europe.

Stokes unsuccessfully fought Glasgow Central for Labour in 1935. He won the Ipswich seat in a 1938 by-election, which he kept in the 1945, 1950, 1951 and 1955 elections.

== Opposition to the Second World War ==
Prior to the war, Stokes founded and led the Parliamentary Peace Aims Group, which was critical of the war, although his opposition was regarded as being that of a "fascist fellow traveller" and not that of a pacifist. He was also, at this time, a member of the anti-semitic, pro-appeasement organisation Militant Christian Patriots. It was through his connections with such anti-war groups that he became personally friendly with several prominent English far-right figures, such as Hastings Russell, Marquis of Tavistock and Gerard Wallop, Viscount Lymington, and during the war itself he campaigned for the release of those fascist sympathisers (and others) who had been interned under Defence Regulation 18B.

In January 1940, Stokes wrote a self-financed pamphlet entitled What is Happening in Europe?, which was sent to every member of both Houses of Parliament and called for a peace treaty with Nazi Germany. Unlike much pacifist literature, Stokes's pamphlet was sympathetic to German arguments, explicitly blaming Poland (which he called "a state monstrously swollen by aggression") for starting the war, while Czechoslovakia was described as "a fortress state obviously directed against Germany". Following Germany's invasion of France later that year Stokes was unable to sustain such anti-war rhetoric, and he instead focused on criticising the conduct of the Allied forces (see below) and attacking the Soviet Union as the principal threat to global peace should the Nazis be defeated.

== Questioning the war's conduct ==
With Bishop George Bell and fellow Labour Member of Parliament (MP) Alfred Salter, he opposed area strategic bombing during World War II. Stokes was seen as the most determined critic of area bombing in the House of Commons.

It was Stokes's questions in the House of Commons on the bombing of Dresden that were in large part responsible for the shift in British opinion against this type of raid. Frederick Taylor writes that Stokes repeated information from the German Press Agency (controlled by the Propaganda Ministry) and although the destruction of Dresden would have affected people's support for the Allies regardless of German propaganda, at least some of the outrage did depend on Goebbels' falsification of the casualty figures.

Stokes raised other issues after the war relating to Yalta and the forced repatriation of Yugoslavs, and the treatment of Dr George Chatterton-Hill in Germany. He was part of the Hankey lobby that lobbied in favour of Wehrmacht generals so that they would be able to fight against the Soviet Union if needed. Stokes was also a prominent critic of the inadequacy of Allied tank design.

== Postwar career ==
Following the 1945 general election, Labour were returned to power. Stokes was denied office, possibly because of his war time politics, and devoted much of his energy to the Friends of Ireland group, of which he was treasurer. He was a member of the Executive of Save Europe Now, a group formed to improve the conditions for civilians in the British occupation zone in Germany.

He was appointed Lord Privy Seal and the new position of Minister of Materials in April 1951, succeeding Ernest Bevin, but served only a few months before Labour lost the 1951 general election. He aimed to show that the proposed armaments programme could be carried out, contrary to the claims of Aneurin Bevan and Harold Wilson (who had resigned over this and other issues). He was involved in the controversy over the Anglo-Persian Oil Company. After Labour lost power to the Conservatives he was elected to the Shadow Cabinet where he served as shadow Defence spokesman, although he was voted out in 1956.

== Death ==
Stokes died at home on 3 August 1957 in London of an apparent heart attack, according to his death notice. A few days before, on 23 July, he had been in a road accident when his car overturned during a thunderstorm on the flooded London road at Stanway near Colchester. The injuries which he sustained contributed to his death from a pulmonary embolism.

Parliament of the United Kingdom
Preceded by Sir John Ganzoni	Member of Parliament for Ipswich; 1938–1957	Succeeded by Dingle Foot
Political offices
Preceded by Charles Key	Minister of Works; 1950–1951	Succeeded by George Brown
Preceded by Ernest Bevin	Lord Privy Seal; 1951	Succeeded by The Marquess of Salisbury
