= Reg Prentice =

British politician

The Right Honourable The Lord Prentice PC
- Prentice in 1963
Frontbench portfolios 1964–1981
Minister of State for Social Security
In office 7 May 1979 – 5 January 1981
Prime Minister	Margaret Thatcher
Preceded by	Alf Morris
Succeeded by	Hugh Rossi
Minister of State for Overseas Development
In office 10 June 1975 – 21 December 1976
Prime Minister	Harold Wilson; James Callaghan
Preceded by	Judith Hart
Succeeded by	Frank Judd
In office 29 August 1967 – 6 October 1969
Prime Minister	Harold Wilson
Preceded by	Arthur Bottomley
Succeeded by	Judith Hart
Secretary of State for Education and Science
In office 5 March 1974 – 10 June 1975
Prime Minister	Harold Wilson
Preceded by	Margaret Thatcher
Succeeded by	Fred Mulley
Shadow Secretary of State for Employment
In office 19 April 1972 – 5 March 1974
Leader	Harold Wilson
Preceded by	James Callaghan
Succeeded by	William Whitelaw
Minister of Public Buildings and Works
In office 6 April 1966 – 29 August 1967
Prime Minister	Harold Wilson
Preceded by	Charles Pannell
Succeeded by	Bob Mellish
Minister of State for Education and Science
In office 20 October 1964 – 6 April 1966
Prime Minister	Harold Wilson
Preceded by	Peter Legh
Succeeded by	Goronwy Roberts

Member of Parliament
- In office 30 May 1957 – 18 May 1987
- Preceded by: Percy Daines
- Succeeded by: Tim Boswell
- Constituency: Newham North East (1957–1979); Daventry (1979–1987)

Member of the House of Lords
- Lord Temporal
- Life peerage 30 January 1992 – 18 January 2001

Personal details
- Born: Reginald Ernest Prentice; 16 July 1923 Croydon
- Died: 18 January 2001 (aged 77) Mildenhall, Wiltshire
- Party: Conservative (1977–2001)
- Other political affiliations: Labour (before 1977)
- Education: London School of Economics

Reginald Ernest Prentice, Baron Prentice, PC (16 July 1923 – 18 January 2001) was a British politician who held ministerial office in both Labour and Conservative Party governments. He was the most senior Labour figure ever to defect to the Conservative Party.

== Education and war service ==
Reg Prentice was born in Croydon, Surrey, and educated at Whitgift School in South Croydon, then at the London School of Economics. He served in Austria and Italy during World War II.

== Early politics ==
Prentice joined the staff of the Transport and General Workers Union (TGWU) in 1950.

He was a councillor for Whitehorse Manor in the then-County Borough of Croydon from 1949, having stood unsuccessfully in Thornton Heath ward in 1947. He served on the Housing, Libraries, Planning & Development, Water and Reconstruction Committees.

He first stood, unsuccessfully, for parliament in Croydon North in 1950 and 1951, then Streatham in 1955. As Labour Member of Parliament from 1957 for East Ham North, later Newham North East, he was a minister of state in Harold Wilson's first government at Education and Science (1964–66), then as Minister of Public Buildings and Works (1966–67), and finally was put in charge of the still-new Ministry of Overseas Development (1967–69).

In the 1971 Shadow Cabinet election, Prentice just missed out on being elected, finishing in 13th place in the ballot for 12 available places. However, in April 1972 the resignations from the shadow cabinet of Harold Lever and George Thomson saw Prentice and 14th placed candidate John Silkin join the body in their place. At the next shadow cabinet election, Prentice topped the poll and he was again re-elected in 1973, this time finishing in third place.

When Labour regained power, he was Secretary of State for Education and Science between 1974 and 1975, subsequently becoming Minister for Overseas Development with a seat in the cabinet until 1976.

In 1975, after his Constituency Labour Party had been infiltrated by Trotskyist Militants, he was deselected. He appealed unsuccessfully from the rostrum of the Labour Party Conference for the National Executive Committee to overturn their endorsement of his deselection.

== Switch of party ==
In 1977, Prentice left the Labour Party after a series of battles with left-wing constituency activists and joined the Conservative Party.

He was elected as a Conservative Member of Parliament for Daventry in the 1979 general election. Lady Hesketh was instrumental in him standing for Daventry. He was a Minister of State at the Department of Health and Social Security in Margaret Thatcher's government between 1979 and 1981. He left the government owing to ill health. He was knighted in 1987, the year he stepped down as an MP. On 30 January 1992, he was created Life Peer as Baron Prentice, of Daventry in the County of Northamptonshire.

In the last few years before his death at age 77, he was President of the Devizes Conservative Association.

== Death and legacy ==
Prentice died at his home in Mildenhall, Wiltshire. His daughter, Christine, followed her father as a London Borough of Croydon councillor for Coulsdon East ward from 1992 to 1998.

A biography, which provides an in-depth account of Prentice's party-political transition during the 1970s, was published in 2015: Geoff Horn, Crossing the floor: Reg Prentice and the crisis of British social democracy.

== Archives ==
- Catalogue of the Prentice papers Archives Division, London School of Economics

Parliament of the United Kingdom
Preceded by Percy Daines	Member of Parliament for East Ham North; 1957 – 1974	Constituency abolished
New constituency	Member of Parliament for Newham North East; 1974–1979	Succeeded by Ron Leighton
Preceded by Arthur Jones	Member of Parliament for Daventry; 1979–1987	Succeeded by Tim Boswell
Political offices
Preceded by Charles Pannell	Minister of Public Buildings and Works; 1966–1967	Succeeded by Bob Mellish
Preceded by Arthur Bottomley	Minister of State for Overseas Development; 1967–1969	Succeeded by Judith Hart
Preceded by Margaret Thatcher	Secretary of State for Education and Science; 1974–1975	Succeeded by Fred Mulley
Preceded by Judith Hart	Minister of State for Overseas Development; 1975–1976	Succeeded by Frank Judd
Preceded by Alf Morris	Minister of State for Social Security (Minister for the Disabled); 1979–1981	Succeeded by Hugh Rossi
