= Kenneth Younger =

British MP (1908–1976)

The Right Honourable Sir Kenneth Younger KBE
- Portrait by Walter Stoneman, 1947

Shadow Home Secretary
- In office 15 July 1955 – 24 January 1958
- Leader: Clement Attlee; Hugh Gaitskell
- Preceded by: Position established
- Succeeded by: Patrick Gordon-Walker

Minister of State for Foreign Affairs
- In office 28 February 1950 – 26 October 1951
- Prime Minister: Clement Attlee
- Preceded by: Hector McNeil
- Succeeded by: Selwyn Lloyd

Under-Secretary of State for the Home Department
- In office 7 October 1947 – 28 February 1950
- Prime Minister: Clement Attlee
- Preceded by: George Oliver
- Succeeded by: Geoffrey de Freitas

Member of Parliament for Grimsby
- In office 5 July 1945 – 18 September 1959
- Preceded by: Sir Walter Womersley
- Succeeded by: Anthony Crosland

Personal details
- Born: Kenneth Gilmour Younger; 15 December 1908
- Died: 19 May 1976 (aged 67) London, England
- Party: Labour
- Spouse: Elizabeth Stewart (m. 1934)
- Children: 3, including Sam
- Education: New College, Oxford

Military service
- Allegiance: United Kingdom
- Branch/service: British Army
- Unit: Intelligence Corps
- Battles/wars: Second World War

Sir Kenneth Gilmour Younger KBE (15 December 1908 – 19 May 1976) was a British Labour politician and barrister who served in junior government posts during the Attlee government and was an opposition spokesman under Hugh Gaitskell but retired from Parliament early, disillusioned by party politics.

== Family ==
Younger was the son of James Younger, 2nd Viscount Younger of Leckie and as such came from an upper-class background atypical of the Labour movement (he was also the brother of Conservative peer Edward Younger, 3rd Viscount Younger of Leckie and the uncle of future Conservative cabinet minister George Younger, 4th Viscount Younger of Leckie). The family lived at Gargunnock in Stirlingshire. After Winchester College and New College, Oxford, Younger read for the Bar and was called (Inner Temple) in 1932. Two years later he married Elizabeth Stewart. They had two daughters and one son (Sam, who became a BBC executive, and is now Chief Executive of the Charity Commission).

== Entry into politics ==
During World War II, Younger served in the Intelligence Corps and rose to the rank of Major. At the end of December 1944 he was adopted as Labour candidate for Grimsby which was then held by Walter Womersley for the Conservatives with a small majority. In the 1945 general election Younger won easily. Philip Noel-Baker, who was Minister of State for Air, appointed Younger as his Parliamentary Private Secretary immediately after the election. This appointment did not stop Younger from trying to understand the lives of his constituents better: on 28 August 1945 he set sail on the steam trawler Marano from Grimsby as a 'spare hand' for an eight- or nine-day voyage to North Sea fishing grounds.

== Ministerial office ==
His experience in intelligence led him to be appointed as Chairman of the UNRRA Committee of Council on Europe on 6 June 1946. Later that year he was named as part of the British delegation to the United Nations General Assembly, and on his return he opened an exhibition of the United Nations to the International Association of Journalists, also speaking to public meetings about the work of the UN. He was also a member of the Supreme Court Committee on Practice and Procedure. His abilities had caught the eye of Clement Attlee, and in a government reshuffle on 7 October 1947 he became Parliamentary Secretary to the Home Office.

== Foreign Office work ==
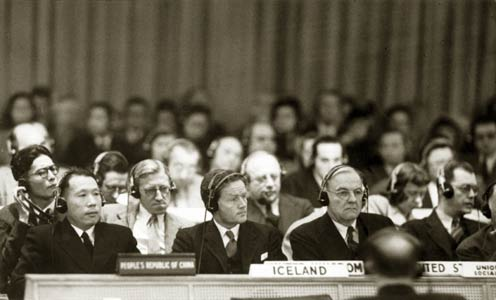
Younger (center) at the United Nations, ca. 1950

Following the 1950 general election, Younger was promoted to be Minister of State at the Foreign Office, the deputy to Foreign Secretary Ernest Bevin. Following Bevin's illness in April 1950, Younger became Acting Foreign Secretary. He picked up on British attempts at diplomacy to try to bring the Communists who had taken control of China into the international community, attempts that did not meet with success, although the United Kingdom did recognise the Communists as having de jure control. Younger also led on developing British policy in relation to the European Coal and Steel Community when it was first proposed; the government had wanted to participate but was unable to accept proposals drafted by the French government and therefore did not join.

At the time of the outbreak of the Korean War in June 1950, Bevin was ill and Younger played a central role in determining Britain's diplomatic reaction. Later that year he headed the British delegation to the UN General Assembly and introduced the British proposals for a negotiated ceasefire; he rejected Soviet proposals which contained a vague promise of 'free elections' in Korea but did not state how they were to be organised. Younger tried to assure the Chinese government that United Nations forces would not pursue the North Korean army further and attempt to invade China. In late October, he suggested the government of Czechoslovakia had been imposed on the country by the proximity of Soviet troops; this was angrily rejected by the delegate from that (former) country.

== In opposition ==
Younger was rated a success by Attlee but was not of sufficient stature to take over when Bevin finally moved from the Foreign Office due to ill health in March 1951. He was one of the more prominent Labour speakers in the 1951 general election campaign, and following the election was made a member of the Privy Council in Attlee's resignation honours list. As a moderate, Younger offered himself as a candidate for the Parliamentary Labour Party Parliamentary Committee (the "Shadow Cabinet") in the early 1950s and served as an opposition spokesman. In 1955 he was elected to the Shadow Cabinet and served under Attlee and Gaitskell as Shadow Home Secretary.

== Post-Parliamentary career ==
However, Younger soon lost interest in high-profile party politics and in 1957 he was defeated for the Shadow Cabinet. He was more interested in individual campaigns, becoming a member of the Homosexual Law Reform Society. He stood down from Parliament in 1959 (ceding his seat to Anthony Crosland, a fellow moderate). He became a Director of the Royal Institute of International Affairs (better known as "Chatham House") and from 1960 to 1973 he was chairman of the Howard League for Penal Reform.

Having experience in government, Younger was recruited to chair the Advisory Council on the Penal System in 1966, and to chair the Committee of Inquiry on Privacy from 1970 to 1972, receiving the KBE as a reward. In 1976 he was made Chairman of the Data Protection Committee but died before the inquiry had concluded. He was also Chairman of the Lambeth, Southwark and Lewisham Area Health Authority from 1974 to 1976.

Parliament of the United Kingdom
Preceded by Sir Walter Womersley	Member of Parliament for Grimsby; 1945 – 1959	Succeeded by Anthony Crosland
