= Herbert Bowden, Baron Aylestone =

British politician (1905–1994)

The Right Honourable The Lord Aylestone CH CBE PC
- Bowden in 1965

Secretary of State for Commonwealth Affairs
- In office 1 August 1966 – 29 August 1967
- Prime Minister: Harold Wilson
- Preceded by: Arthur Bottomley (Commonwealth Relations)
- Succeeded by: George Thomson

Leader of the House of Commons Lord President of the Council
- In office 16 October 1964 – 11 August 1966
- Prime Minister: Harold Wilson
- Preceded by: Selwyn Lloyd (Leader of Commons); Quintin Hogg (President of Council)
- Succeeded by: Richard Crossman

Opposition Chief Whip of the House of Commons
- In office 10 June 1955 – 16 October 1964
- Deputy: Ernest Popplewell (1955–59); John Taylor (1959–62); Edward Short (1962–64)
- Leader: Clement Attlee; Hugh Gaitskell; George Brown; Harold Wilson
- Preceded by: William Whiteley
- Succeeded by: Martin Redmayne

Opposition Deputy Chief Whip of the House of Commons
- In office 6 November 1951 – 10 June 1955
- Leader: Clement Attlee
- Preceded by: Cedric Drewe
- Succeeded by: Ernest Popplewell

Member of the House of Lords Lord Temporal
- In office 3 November 1967 – 30 April 1994; Life Peerage

Member of Parliament for Leicester South West Leicester South (1945–1950)
- In office 5 July 1945 – 2 November 1967
- Preceded by: Charles Waterhouse
- Succeeded by: Tom Boardman

Personal details
- Born: 20 January 1905 Cardiff, Wales, UK
- Died: 30 April 1994 (aged 89) Worthing, West Sussex, UK
- Party: ILP (until 1936); Labour (1936–81); SDP (1981–88) 'Continuing' SDP (1988–90); Liberal Democrats (1992–94)
- Spouses: Louisa Brown (m. 1928; died 1992) Vicki Clayton (m. 1993)
- Parent(s): Herbert Bowden & Henrietta Gould

Herbert William Bowden, Baron Aylestone (20 January 1905 – 30 April 1994) was a British Labour politician.

== Early life ==
Born in Cardiff, Wales, Bowden was the son of Herbert Bowden, a baker, and his wife Henrietta (née Gould). Bowden later recalled that "I was born with the smell of bread in my nostrils and lived around the bakehouses. I always had one thought in mind – never to be employed in them." After completing elementary school he opened a tobacconist's shop, but following the collapse of his business during the Great Depression he left Cardiff to look for work elsewhere, eventually becoming a radio salesman in Leicester.

== Political career ==
Bowden had been a member of the Independent Labour Party (ILP) as a young man, but sided with the Labour Party when the two parties disagreed over how best to support the Republican faction in the Spanish Civil War.

In 1938, he was elected to sit on Leicester City Council, and later that year became president of the city's Labour Party.

=== Commons ===
Having served as a flying officer in the Royal Air Force during World War II, Bowden was elected MP for Leicester South at the 1945 general election, and then for Leicester South West from 1950 until his retirement from the House of Commons in 1967. He was appointed a whip in 1949 and a Lord Commissioner of the Treasury in 1950. From 1951 onwards, he was Deputy Chief Whip, then Chief Whip throughout Labour's years in opposition. Bowden was appointed a Commander of the Order of the British Empire (CBE) in the 1953 Coronation Honours.

Bowden was regarded as being on the right of the Labour Party, and supported Hugh Gaitskell in his battles with the left before switching his allegiance to Harold Wilson following Gaitskell's death in 1963. He was, as the Daily Telegraph later commented, somewhat "traditional" in his mindset, representing the "authentic... old hat, passé, reactionary voice of the Labour Party", but his forthright attitude to party discipline (which had earned him the sobriquet "The Sergeant Major" amongst Labour MPs) made him an efficient and much-respected parliamentary whip. Thus, when Labour returned to power in 1964, Bowden was appointed Leader of the House of Commons and Lord President of the Council, having become a Privy Counsellor in 1962. In 1966, he was moved to the new post of Secretary of State for Commonwealth Affairs, serving until 1967. On 1 September 1967 he succeeded Lord Hill as chairman of the Independent Television Authority, and stood down from the Commons two months later.

=== Lords ===
On 20 September 1967, Bowden was created a life peer as Baron Aylestone, of Aylestone in the City of Leicester, taking the Labour whip. He was appointed a member of the Order of the Companions of Honour in the 1975 Birthday Honours, and from 1984 to 1992 was a Deputy Speaker of the House of Lords.

To many people's surprise, he left Labour to join the Social Democratic Party (SDP) in 1981. Remaining with the SDP throughout the party's existence, after its demise in 1988 he chose to follow David Owen's breakaway 'continuing' SDP rather than support the merger with the Liberals. When the Owenite rump itself dissolved two years later, Aylestone sat in the Lords as an 'Independent Social Democrat' before joining the Liberal Democrats in 1992.

== Death ==
Lord Aylestone died in 1994, aged 89, in Worthing, Sussex, and was survived by his second wife and a daughter from his first marriage.

Parliament of the United Kingdom
Preceded by Charles Waterhouse	Member of Parliament for Leicester South; 1945–1950	Constituency abolished
New constituency	Member of Parliament for Leicester South West; 1950–1967	Succeeded by Tom Boardman
Political offices
Preceded by Quintin Hogg	Lord President of the Council; 1964–1966	Succeeded by Richard Crossman
Preceded by Selwyn Lloyd	Leader of the House of Commons; 1964–1966	Succeeded by Richard Crossman
Preceded by Frederick Lee as Secretary of State for the Colonies	Secretary of State for Commonwealth Affairs; 1966–1967	Succeeded by George Morgan Thomson
Preceded by Arthur Bottomley as Secretary of State for Commonwealth Relations	Secretary of State for Commonwealth Affairs; 1966–1967	Succeeded by George Morgan Thomson
Party political offices
Preceded by Arthur Pearson	Deputy Labour Chief Whip of the House of Commons; 1951–1955	Succeeded by Ernest Popplewell
Preceded by William Whiteley	Labour Chief Whip of the House of Commons; 1955–1964	Succeeded by Edward Short
Media offices
Preceded by Charles Hill	Chairman of the Independent Television Authority; 1967–1972	ITA became the IBA
New title	Chairman of the Independent Broadcasting Authority; 1972–1975	Succeeded by Bridget Plowden
