= Frederick Lee, Baron Lee of Newton =

British Labour Party politician and peer

The Right Honourable The Lord Lee of Newton PC

Chancellor of the Duchy of Lancaster
- In office 7 January 1967 – 6 October 1969
- Prime Minister: Harold Wilson
- Preceded by: George Thomson
- Succeeded by: George Thomson

Secretary of State for the Colonies
- In office 6 April 1966 – 1 August 1966
- Prime Minister: Harold Wilson
- Preceded by: Frank Pakenham
- Succeeded by: Position abolished

Minister of Power
- In office 18 October 1964 – 6 April 1966
- Prime Minister: Harold Wilson
- Preceded by: Frederick Erroll
- Succeeded by: Richard Marsh

Shadow Minister of Aviation
- In office 6 December 1961 – 18 October 1964
- Leader: Hugh Gaitskell
- Preceded by: John Strachey
- Succeeded by: Julian Amery

Shadow Minister for Labour
- In office November 1960 – 6 December 1961
- Leader: Hugh Gaitskell
- Preceded by: Alfred Robens
- Succeeded by: Ray Gunter

Shadow Minister for Power
- In office November 1959 – November 1960
- Leader: Hugh Gaitskell
- Preceded by: Harold Neal
- Succeeded by: Ray Gunter

Parliamentary Secretary to the Ministry of Labour and National Service
- In office 2 March 1950 – 25 October 1951
- Prime Minister: Clement Attlee
- Preceded by: Ness Edwards
- Succeeded by: Peter Bennett
Parliamentary offices
Member of Parliament for Newton
In office 23 February 1950 – 8 February 1974
Preceded by	Robert Young
Succeeded by	John Evans
Member of Parliament for Manchester Hulme
In office 5 July 1945 – 3 February 1950
Preceded by	Sir Joseph Nall
Succeeded by	Constituency abolished
Member of the House of Lords Lord Temporal
In office 1 July 1974 – 4 February 1984; Life peerage

Personal details
- Born: 3 August 1906 Manchester
- Died: 4 February 1984 (aged 77)
- Party: Labour

Frederick Lee, Baron Lee of Newton, PC (3 August 1906 – 4 February 1984) was a British Labour Party politician and peer.

== Early life ==
Born in Salford to Joseph and Margaret Lee, he was educated at Langworthy Road School of Engineering.

He was Chairman of the Works Committee at Metropolitan-Vickers, Trafford Park, near Manchester, and of the National Committee of the Amalgamated Engineering Union from 1944 to 1945.

== Political career ==
Formerly a Member of Salford City Council, at the 1945 general election he was elected as Member of Parliament for Manchester Hulme.

When that constituency was abolished for the 1950 general election, he was elected for the Newton constituency in Lancashire, and sat for that constituency until retiring from Parliament at the February 1974 general election.

In 1960, on the death of Aneurin Bevan, he stood as a left-wing candidate for Labour's Deputy Leadership against George Brown and James Callaghan. After Callaghan had been eliminated, Lee was defeated by Brown by 146 votes to 83.

He was Parliamentary Private Secretary to the Chancellor of the Exchequer from 1948, and held Ministerial office as Parliamentary Secretary to the Ministry of Labour and National Service from 1950 to 1951, Minister of Power from 1964 to 1966, the last Secretary of State for the Colonies in 1966, and Chancellor of the Duchy of Lancaster from 1967 to 1969.

He was appointed a Privy Counsellor in 1964.

== Later life ==
On his retirement in 1974 was created a life peer on 1 July 1974 as Baron Lee of Newton, of Newton in the County of Merseyside.

Parliament of the United Kingdom
Preceded by Sir Joseph Nall, Bt	Member of Parliament for Manchester Hulme; 1945–1950	Constituency abolished
Preceded by Robert Young	Member of Parliament for Newton; 1950 – February 1974	Succeeded by John Evans
Political offices
Preceded by Lord Longford	Secretary of State for the Colonies; 1966	Succeeded by Herbert Bowden as Secretary of State for Commonwealth Affairs
Preceded by Frederick Erroll	Minister of Power; 1964–1966	Succeeded by Richard Marsh
Preceded by George Thomson	Chancellor of the Duchy of Lancaster; 1967–1969	Succeeded by George Thomson
