= Cardiff South East =

UK Parliament constituency (1950–1983)

- Former borough constituency for the House of Commons

1950–1983
- Seats: one
- Created from: Cardiff Central, Cardiff East and Cardiff South
- Replaced by: Cardiff South & Penarth, Cardiff Central and Cardiff West

Cardiff South East was a parliamentary constituency in Cardiff, Wales. It returned one member of parliament to the House of Commons of the Parliament of the United Kingdom.

The constituency was created for the 1950 general election and abolished before the 1983 general election. Its only MP was Labour's James Callaghan, who served as Prime Minister of the United Kingdom from 1976 to 1979, while still serving as the seat's MP. Its equivalent today is Cardiff South and Penarth.

== Boundaries ==
1950–1974: The County Borough of Cardiff wards of Adamsdown, Roath, South, and Splott, and the Urban District of Penarth.

1974–1983: The County Borough of Cardiff wards of Adamsdown, Grangetown, Roath, Rumney, South, and Splott.

== Members of Parliament ==
Election	Member	Party
1950	James Callaghan	Labour

== Election results ==
=== Elections in the 1950s ===
General election 1950: Cardiff South East
Party	Candidate	Votes	%	±%
Labour	James Callaghan	26,254	51.8	
Conservative	J John Hayward	20,359	40.2	
Liberal	Patrick Furnell	4,080	8.1	
Majority		5,895	11.6	
Turnout		50,693	83.3	
Labour win (new seat)				

General election 1951: Cardiff South East
Party	Candidate	Votes	%	±%
Labour	James Callaghan	28,112	54.35	+2.56
Conservative	Harry West	23,613	45.65	+5.49
Majority		4,499	8.70	−2.93
Turnout		51,725	84.93	+1.60
Labour hold		Swing	−1.46	

General election 1955: Cardiff South East
Party	Candidate	Votes	%	±%
Labour	James Callaghan	25,722	53.36	−0.99
Conservative	Michael Roberts	22,482	46.64	+0.99
Majority		3,240	6.72	−1.98
Turnout		48,204	79.33	−4.60
Labour hold		Swing	−0.99	

General election 1959: Cardiff South East
Party	Candidate	Votes	%	±%
Labour	James Callaghan	26,915	50.8	−2.6
Conservative	Michael Roberts	26,047	49.2	+2.6
Majority		868	1.6	−5.1
Turnout		52,962	82.0	+2.7
Labour hold		Swing	−2.6	

=== Elections in the 1960s ===
General election 1964: Cardiff South East
Party	Candidate	Votes	%	±%
Labour	James Callaghan	30,129	57.48	+6.66
Conservative	Ted Dexter	22,288	42.52	−6.66
Majority		7,841	14.96	+13.32
Turnout		52,417	79.87	−2.13
Labour hold		Swing	+6.76	

General election 1966: Cardiff South East
Party	Candidate	Votes	%	±%
Labour	James Callaghan	29,313	56.8	−0.7
Conservative	Norman Lloyd-Edwards	18,476	35.8	−6.7
Liberal	George W Parsons	3,829	7.4	New
Majority		10,837	21.0	+6.0
Turnout		51,618	78.9	−1.0
Labour hold		Swing	+3.0	

=== Elections in the 1970s ===
General election 1970: Cardiff South East
Party	Candidate	Votes	%	±%
Labour	James Callaghan	26,226	51.9	−4.9
Conservative	Norman Lloyd-Edwards	20,771	41.1	+5.3
Plaid Cymru	Richard Davies	2,585	5.1	New
National Front	George W. Parsons	982	1.9	New
Majority		5,455	10.8	−9.8
Turnout		50,562	73.2	−5.7
Labour hold		Swing	−5.1	

General election February 1974: Cardiff South East
Party	Candidate	Votes	%	±%
Labour	James Callaghan	20,641	49.0	−6.1
Conservative	Stefan Terlezki	13,495	32.0	−6.9
Independent Liberal	Christopher Bailey	3,800	9.0	New
Liberal	B. Christon	2,978	7.1	New
Plaid Cymru	Keith Bush	1,254	3.0	−2.1
Majority		7,146	17.0	+0.8
Turnout		42,168	74.3	+1.1
Labour hold		Swing	+0.5	

General election October 1974: Cardiff South East
Party	Candidate	Votes	%	±%
Labour	James Callaghan	21,074	52.0	+3.0
Conservative	Stefan Terlezki	10,356	25.6	−6.4
Liberal	Christopher Bailey	8,006	19.8	+12.7
Plaid Cymru	Keith Bush	983	2.4	−0.6
Marxist-Leninist (England)	B.C.D. Harris	75	0.2	New
Majority		10,718	26.4	+9.4
Turnout		40,494	70.7	−3.6
Labour hold		Swing	+4.7	

General election 1979: Cardiff South East
Party	Candidate	Votes	%	±%
Labour	James Callaghan	23,871	59.3	+7.3
Conservative	Ivor Samuel Jones	15,170	37.7	+12.1
Plaid Cymru	Eric Randolf Roberts	628	1.6	−0.8
Severnside Libertarian	Raymond William Aldridge	375	0.9	New
Socialist Unity	Pat Arrowsmith	132	0.3	New
Communist	Richard Horatio Spencer	112	0.3	New
Majority		8,701	21.6	−4.8
Turnout		40,288	71.6	+0.9
Labour hold		Swing	−2.4	

Note: The official Liberal candidate for Cardiff South East in 1979, Christopher Bailey, deliberately failed to submit his nomination papers in time and advised Liberal voters to vote Conservative. He was subsequently expelled from the Liberal Party.

This election was remembered for when Pat Arrowsmith heckled Callaghan throughout the election declaration. During the customary victory speech, Callaghan continued to be interrupted throughout and Callaghan remarked it was the first time he had 'conducted a duet' whilst giving a victory speech. When Arrowsmith refused to desist, Callaghan and the other candidates left the stage. Arrowsmith (who had been arrested in Cardiff the day before the election) made a short statement about Northern Ireland. These scenes were broadcast live on BBC Election 79.

Parliament of the United Kingdom
Preceded by Barnet	Constituency represented by the chancellor of the Exchequer; 1964–1967	Succeeded by Birmingham Stechford
Preceded by Huyton	Constituency represented by the prime minister 1976–1979	Succeeded by Finchley
Preceded by Finchley	Constituency represented by the leader of the opposition 1979–1980	Succeeded by Ebbw Vale
