= Huyton (constituency) =

Parliamentary constituency in the United Kingdom, 1950–1983

- Former county constituency for the House of Commons
- Huyton in Lancashire, showing boundaries used from 1974–1983

1950–1983
- Seats: One
- Created from: Widnes (north part of)
- Replaced by: Knowsley South, Knowsley North, St Helens South and St Helens North

Huyton (/ˈhaɪtən/ HY-tən) is a former constituency of the House of Commons. Created in 1950, it was centred on Huyton in Lancashire (later Merseyside), North West England, just beyond the borders of the city of Liverpool. The only MP was frontbench Labour politician, Harold Wilson who while representing the seat became Leader of the Labour Party in 1963 and prime minister from 1964 to 1970 and again from 1974 to 1976.

The constituency was dissolved under 1983 boundary changes—largely replaced by Knowsley South. This coincided with Wilson's retirement from Parliament.

== Opposition parties ==
The Liberals ran a candidate in the constituency on its creation in 1950 but did not run one again until 24 years later in 1974, by which time Wilson had become Leader of the Labour Party and served two terms as prime minister. The party finished in third place in all the elections it contested in this seat. Huyton was a somewhat marginal seat in its early contests, but Wilson achieved an absolute majority, save in the 1950 election, the runner up party always a Conservative party candidate, who polled best in 1951 with 48.7% of the vote, as it became a much safer seat for Labour from the 1960s onwards, with Wilson representing the area for over three decades as its only MP.

Political forebears

The Widnes seat was, in the early 20th century, a marginal seat: in the elections immediately preceding 1950, it alternated between the two largest parties.

== Urbanisation ==
The seat was more suburban at a time of relatively low employment in the sub-region in the 1950s. Council housing and private sector construction of relatively smaller homes by the 1980s complimented the overwhelmingly semi-detached housing stock, downgrading the local housing stock during the seat's existence while solving the problem of chronic housing shortages in the city itself; a time when Merseyside expanded by a programme of home building and motorway building within the confines of Huyton and its suburbs moved further out particularly to the Wirral and other areas on the fringe of the new metropolitan county. The M57 was completed bisecting the area in 1974, so also the M62.

== Election expenses and type of returning officer ==
The seat was classified as a higher-level expenses and returning officer county constituency rather than a borough constituency.

== Boundaries ==
1950–1964: The Urban Districts of Huyton-with-Roby and Prescot, and in the Rural District of Whiston the parishes of Eccleston, Kirkby, Knowsley, and Windle.

1964–1974: The Urban Districts of Huyton-with-Roby, Kirkby and Prescot, and in the Rural District of Whiston the parishes of Eccleston, Knowsley, and Windle.

1974–1983: As prior less Kirkby. This was transferred to the redrawn Ormskirk constituency.

== Members of Parliament ==
Election	Member	Party
1950	Harold Wilson	Labour
1983	Constituency abolished	

== Election results ==
=== Elections in the 1950s ===
General election 1950: Huyton
Party	Candidate	Votes	%	±%
Labour	Harold Wilson	21,536	48.4	
Conservative	Sydney Smart	20,702	46.5	
Liberal	Herbert Griffith Edwards	1,905	4.3	
Communist	Leo Joseph McGree	387	0.9	
Majority		834	1.9	
Turnout		44,530	85.0	
Labour win (new seat)				

General election 1951: Huyton
Party	Candidate	Votes	%	±%
Labour	Harold Wilson	23,582	51.3	+2.9
Conservative	Francis Leslie Neep	22,389	48.7	+2.2
Majority		1,193	2.6	+0.7
Turnout		45,971	84.8	−0.2
Labour hold		Swing	+0.3	

General election 1955: Huyton
Party	Candidate	Votes	%	±%
Labour	Harold Wilson	24,858	52.7	+1.4
Conservative	Geraint Morgan	22,300	47.3	−1.4
Majority		2,558	5.4	+2.8
Turnout		47,158	78.5	−6.3
Labour hold		Swing	+1.4	

General election 1959: Huyton
Party	Candidate	Votes	%	±%
Labour	Harold Wilson	33,111	54.9	+2.2
Conservative	George Bentley Woolfenden	27,184	45.1	−2.2
Majority		5,927	9.8	+4.4
Turnout		60,295	77.9	−0.6
Labour hold		Swing	+2.2	

=== Elections in the 1960s ===
General election 1964: Huyton
Party	Candidate	Votes	%	±%
Labour	Harold Wilson	42,213	63.9	+9.0
Conservative	Harold Tucker	22,940	34.7	−10.4
Committee to Defeat Revisionism for Communist Unity	Michael Claude Watkins Baker	899	1.4	New
Majority		19,273	29.2	+19.4
Turnout		66,052	76.7	−1.2
Labour hold		Swing	+9.7	

General election 1966: Huyton
Party	Candidate	Votes	%	±%
Labour	Harold Wilson	41,122	66.4	+2.5
Conservative	Thomas Lyrian Hobday	20,182	32.6	−2.1
National Teenage Party	David Sutch	585	0.9	New
Majority		20,940	33.8	+4.6
Turnout		61,889	70.1	−6.6
Labour hold		Swing	+2.3	

=== Elections in the 1970s ===
General election 1970: Huyton
Party	Candidate	Votes	%	±%
Labour	Harold Wilson	45,583	63.1	−3.3
Conservative	John Nicholas McAlpine Entwistle	24,509	33.9	+1.3
Democratic	John Walter Gerald Sparrow	1,232	1.7	New
Communist	Joseph Ivor Kenny	890	1.2	New
Majority		21,074	29.2	−4.6
Turnout		72,214	70.1	±0.0
Labour hold		Swing	−2.4	

General election February 1974: Huyton
Party	Candidate	Votes	%	±%
Labour	Harold Wilson	31,767	56.7	−5.4
Conservative	Thomas Benyon	16,462	29.4	−4.5
Liberal	N Snowden	7,584	13.5	New
More Prosperous Britain	Harold Smith	234	0.4	New
Majority		15,305	27.3	−1.9
Turnout		56,047	77.2	+7.1
Labour hold		Swing	−0.4	

General election October 1974: Huyton
Party	Candidate	Votes	%	±%
Labour	Harold Wilson	31,750	60.8	+4.1
Conservative	William Peters	15,517	29.7	+0.3
Liberal	Michael Paul Braham	4,956	9.5	−4.0
Majority		16,233	31.0	+3.7
Turnout		52,223	71.1	−6.1
Labour hold		Swing	+1.9	

General election 1979: Huyton
Party	Candidate	Votes	%	±%
Labour	Harold Wilson	27,449	51.9	−8.9
Conservative	Garnet Harrison	19,939	37.7	+8.0
Liberal	Philip Cottier	5,476	10.4	+0.9
Majority		7,510	14.2	−16.8
Turnout		52,864	72.4	+1.3
Labour hold		Swing	−8.5	

== See also ==
- Knowsley South parliamentary constituency

== Sources ==
- Leigh Rayment's Historical List of MPs – Constituencies beginning with "H" (part 4)
- Election results, 1950 - 1979

Parliament of the United Kingdom
Preceded by Belper	Constituency represented by the leader of the opposition 1963–1964	Succeeded by Kinross and Perthshire West
Preceded by Kinross and Perthshire West	Constituency represented by the prime minister 1964–1970	Succeeded by Bexley
Preceded by Bexley	Constituency represented by the leader of the opposition 1970–1974	Succeeded by Sidcup
Preceded by Sidcup	Constituency represented by the prime minister 1974–1976	Succeeded by Cardiff South East
