= Chief Whip of the Labour Party =

Political role in the UK

A chief whip of the Labour Party oversees the whipping system in the Labour Party, and is responsible for ensuring that Labour members of Parliament (MPs) and Labour peers attend and vote in the Parliament of the United Kingdom in the way desired by the party leadership. The two chief whips, one in the House of Commons, and one in the House of Lords, also help to organise their party's contribution to parliamentary business. Each chief whip manages a team of whips, whom they may appoint from the Parliamentary Labour Party, to support the work of the whips' office.

The party leadership may allow members to have a free vote on a measure, based on their own opinion rather than party policy, without requiring the whips to influence the way members vote.

The functions of whips are kept confidential, as they are concerned with the discipline of their party's Members of Parliament.

By convention, Chief Whips do not sign early day motions, table questions to Ministers, or give media interviews in their capacity as whips.

This is a list of those people who have served as chief whip of the Labour Party in the Parliament of the United Kingdom.

== House of Commons ==
Chief Whip of the Labour Party

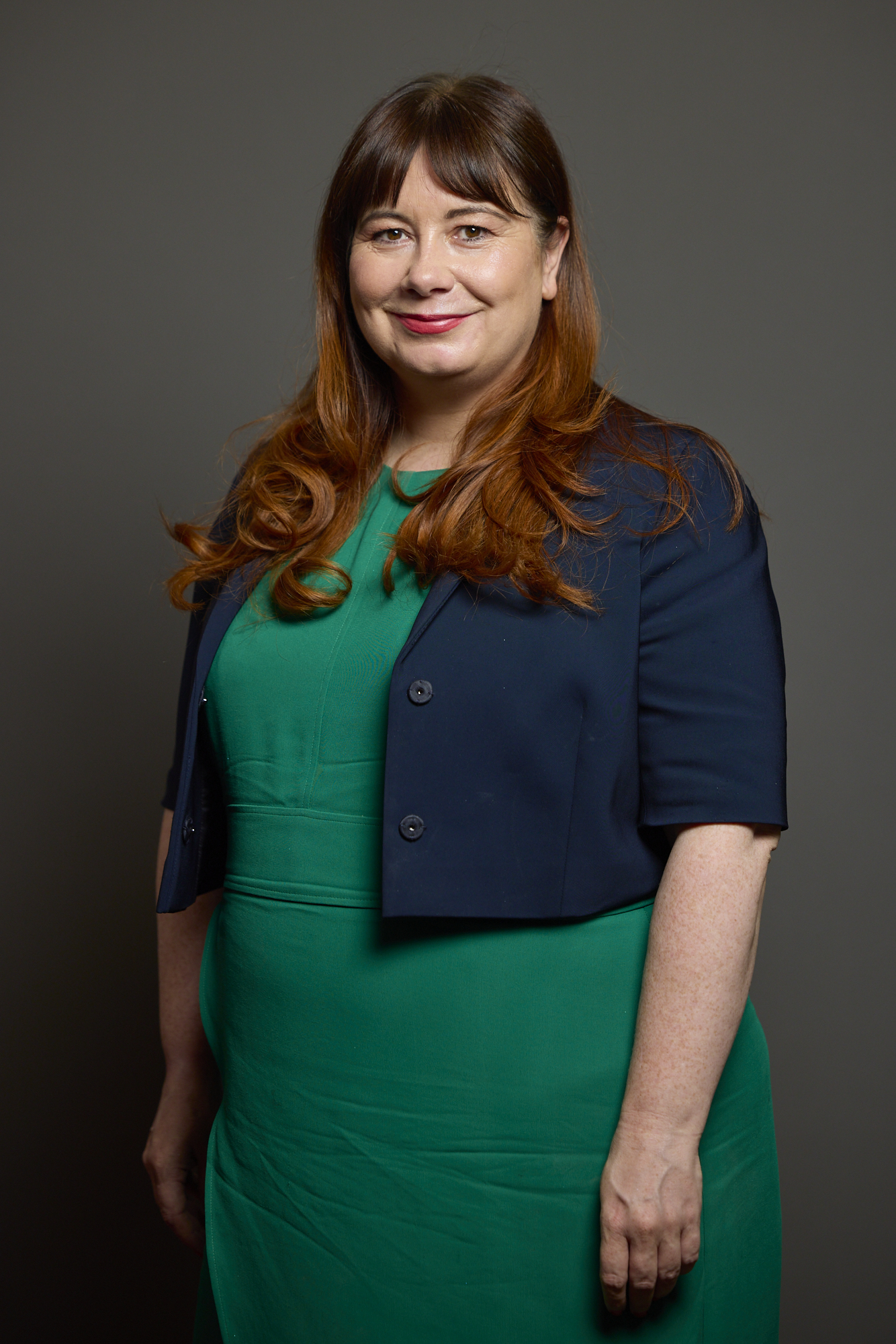
- Incumbent; Anneliese Midgley since 20 July 2026
- Appointer: Leader of the Labour Party
- Inaugural holder: David Shackleton
- Formation: circa 1906

Year	Name	Constituency
1906	David Shackleton	Clitheroe
1906	Arthur Henderson	Barnard Castle
1907	George Roberts	Norwich
1914	Arthur Henderson	Barnard Castle
1914	Frank Goldstone	Sunderland
1916	George Roberts	Norwich
1919	William Tyson Wilson	Westhoughton
1920	Arthur Henderson	Widnes
1924	Benjamin Spoor	Bishop Auckland
1925	Arthur Henderson	Burnley
1927	Thomas Kennedy	Kirkcaldy Burghs
1931	Charles Edwards	Bedwellty
1942	William Whiteley	Blaydon
1955	Herbert Bowden	Leicester South West
1964	Edward Short	Newcastle upon Tyne Central
1966	John Silkin	Deptford
1969	Robert Mellish	Bermondsey
1976	Michael Cocks	Bristol South
1985	Derek Foster	Bishop Auckland
1995	Donald Dewar	Glasgow Garscadden
1997	Nick Brown	Newcastle upon Tyne East and Wallsend
1998	Ann Taylor	Dewsbury
2001	Hilary Armstrong	Durham North West
2006	Jacqui Smith	Redditch
2007	Geoff Hoon	Ashfield
2008	Nick Brown	Newcastle upon Tyne East and Wallsend
2010	Dame Rosie Winterton	Doncaster Central
2016	Nick Brown	Newcastle upon Tyne East
2021	Sir Alan Campbell	Tynemouth
2025	Jonathan Reynolds	Stalybridge and Hyde
2026	Anneliese Midgley	Knowsley

=== Deputy Chief Whips ===
Year	Name	Constituency
1935	Wilfred Paling	Wentworth
1940	William Whiteley	Blaydon
1942	Will John	Rhondda West
1944	George Mathers	Blaydon
1946	Arthur Pearson	Pontypridd
1951	Herbert Bowden	Leicester South West
1955	Ernest Popplewell	Newcastle upon Tyne West
1959	John Taylor	West Lothian
1962	Edward Short	Newcastle upon Tyne Central
1964	Sydney Irving	Dartford
1966	John Silkin	Deptford
1966	Charles Grey	Durham
1969	Charles Morris	Manchester Openshaw
1970	Walter Harrison	Wakefield
1983	Norman Hogg	Cumbernauld and Kilsyth
1987	Don Dixon	Jarrow
1995	Nick Brown	Newcastle upon Tyne East
1997	George Mudie	Leeds East
1998	Keith Bradley	Manchester Withington
2001	Keith Hill	Streatham
2003	Bob Ainsworth	Coventry North East
2007	Nick Brown	Newcastle upon Tyne East and Wallsend
2008	Tommy McAvoy	Rutherglen and Hamilton West
2010	Alan Campbell	Tynemouth
2021	Lilian Greenwood	Nottingham South
2023	Mark Tami	Alyn and Deeside

== House of Lords ==
Chief Whip of the Labour Party

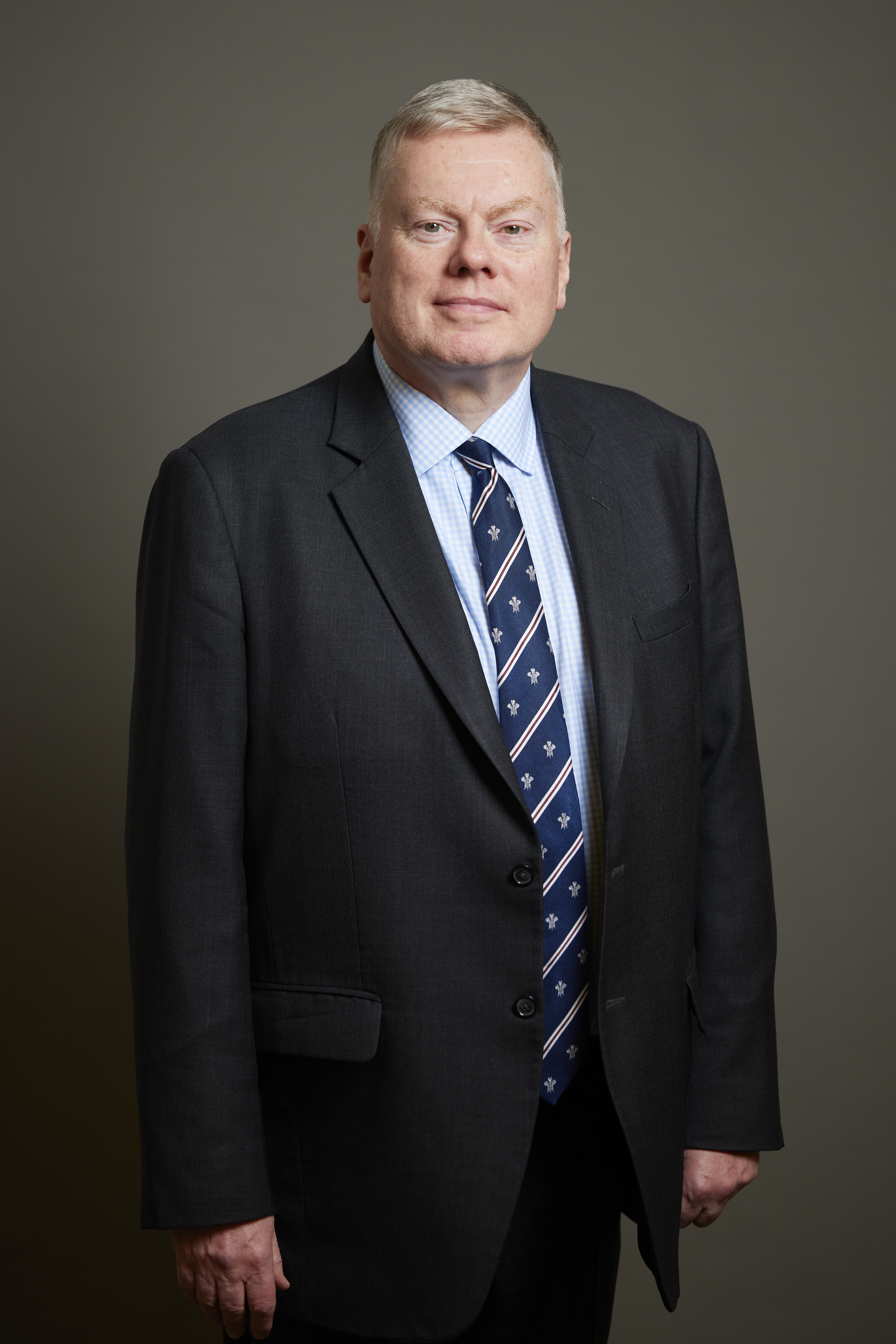
- Incumbent; The Lord Kennedy of Southwark since 1 June 2021
- Inaugural holder: The Lord Muir-Mackenzie and The Earl De La Warr
- Formation: 1924

Year	Name
Feb 1924	The Lord Muir-Mackenzie
Feb 1924	The Earl De La Warr
1930	The Lord Marley
1937	The Lord Strabolgi
1941	The Earl of Listowel
1944	The Lord Southwood
1945	The Lord Ammon
1949	The 1st Lord Shepherd
1954	The Earl of Lucan
1964	The 2nd Lord Shepherd
1967	The Lord Beswick
1973	The Baroness Llewelyn-Davies of Hastoe
1982	The Lord Ponsonby of Shulbrede
1990	The Lord Graham of Edmonton
1997	The Lord Carter
2002	The Lord Grocott
2008	The Baroness Royall of Blaisdon
2008	The Lord Bassam of Brighton
2018	The Lord McAvoy
2021	The Lord Kennedy of Southwark

=== Deputy Chief Whip ===
- Baroness Wheeler (2018-2026)
- Baroness Anderson of Stoke-on-Trent (since 2026)

== See also ==
- Chief Whip of the Conservative Party
- Chief Whip of the Liberal Democrats
- Chief Whip of Reform UK
