= Official Opposition Shadow Cabinet (United Kingdom) =

Opposition cabinet of the United Kingdom

The Official Opposition Shadow Cabinet, or His Majesty's Most Loyal Opposition Shadow Cabinet, usually simply the Shadow Cabinet, is the committee of senior members of the Official Opposition who scrutinise the work of the Cabinet of the United Kingdom. Each Shadow Cabinet member is typically given a position which corresponds to that of a government minister in Cabinet.

== Composition ==
Shadow Cabinet members, commonly known as shadow ministers, are usually appointed by the leader of the Opposition (currently Kemi Badenoch). The roles of shadow ministers are to develop alternative policies, hold the government to account for its actions and responses, and act as spokespeople for the opposition party in their own specific policy areas. By convention, shadow ministers are drawn either from serving members of the House of Commons or the House of Lords, with most chosen from the former. Since July 2024, the Conservative Party has been the Official Opposition, and its leadership therefore forms the current Shadow Cabinet.

Not all opposition frontbenchers are members of the Shadow Cabinet, which is composed of the most senior opposition members (usually they number around twenty).

The leader of the Opposition, the Opposition chief whip and Opposition deputy chief whip are the only members of the Official Opposition in the House of Commons to be paid for their opposition roles in addition to their salaries as members of Parliament. The leader of the Opposition and the Opposition chief whip in the House of Lords also receive a salary.

Other parties may also form frontbench teams of spokespeople which may be referred to as shadow cabinets by the party (e.g. the Liberal Democrats in 2019), but these are not part of the Official Opposition Shadow Cabinet.

== Current Shadow Cabinet ==
As of August 2026, the members of the shadow cabinet are:

Shadow Minister Constituency	Shadow Office(s)	Office(s)	Minister(s)	Start
Full Shadow Cabinet
Kemi Badenoch; MP for North West Essex	Leader of the Opposition	Prime Minister	Andy Burnham	2 November 2024
Alex Burghart; MP for Brentwood and Ongar	Deputy Leader of the Opposition	First Secretary of State	Louise Haigh	1 September 2026
Alex Burghart; MP for Brentwood and Ongar	Shadow Chancellor of the Duchy of Lancaster	Chancellor of the Duchy of Lancaster	Louise Haigh	5 November 2024
Alex Burghart; MP for Brentwood and Ongar	Shadow Secretary of State for Northern Ireland	Secretary of State for Northern Ireland	Chris Bryant	8 July 2024
Andrew Griffith; MP for Arundel and South Downs	Shadow Chancellor of the Exchequer	Chancellor of the Exchequer	John Healey	31 August 2026
Tom Tugendhat; MP for Tonbridge	Shadow Secretary of State for Foreign, Commonwealth and Development Affairs	Secretary of State for Foreign, Commonwealth and Development Affairs	Ed Miliband	31 August 2026
Chris Philp; MP for Croydon South	Shadow Secretary of State for the Home Department	Home Secretary	Shabana Mahmood	5 November 2024
James Cartlidge; MP for South Suffolk	Shadow Secretary of State for Defence	Secretary of State for Defence	Wes Streeting	8 July 2024
Nick Timothy; MP for West Suffolk	Shadow Lord Chancellor; Shadow Secretary of State for Justice	Lord Chancellor; Secretary of State for Justice	Alex Norris	15 January 2026
Damian Hinds; MP for East Hampshire	Shadow Secretary of State for Health and Social Care	Secretary of State for Health and Social Care	Yvette Cooper	31 August 2026
Katie Lam; MP for Weald of Kent	Shadow Secretary of State for Housing, Communities and Local Government	Secretary of State for Housing, Communities and Local Government	Angela Rayner	31 August 2026
Victoria Atkins; MP for Louth and Horncastle	Shadow Secretary of State for Environment, Food and Rural Affairs	Secretary of State for Environment, Food and Rural Affairs	Angela Eagle	5 November 2024
Jesse Norman; MP for Hereford and South Herefordshire	Shadow Leader of the House of Commons	Leader of the House of Commons	Alan Campbell	5 November 2024
Nicholas True; Life peer	Shadow Leader of the House of Lords	Leader of the House of Lords	Angela Smith	8 July 2024
Claire Coutinho; MP for East Surrey; On leave	Shadow Secretary of State for Business, Innovation, Science and Trade	Secretary of State for Business, Innovation, Science and Trade	Jonathan Reynolds	31 August 2026 (Note: Coutinho was appointed during her parental leave and will return from leave in January 2027. Lopez serves as acting shadow secretary in her stead.)
Julia Lopez; MP for Hornchurch and Upminster; Acting	Shadow Secretary of State for Business, Innovation, Science and Trade	Secretary of State for Business, Innovation, Science and Trade	Jonathan Reynolds	31 August 2026
Andrew Bowie; MP for West Aberdeenshire and Kincardine	Shadow Secretary of State for Energy Security	Secretary of State for Energy Security and Net Zero	Miatta Fahnbulleh	31 August 2026
Helen Whately; MP for Faversham and Mid Kent	Shadow Secretary of State for Work and Pensions	Secretary of State for Work and Pensions	Pat McFadden	5 November 2024
Laura Trott; MP for Sevenoaks	Shadow Secretary of State for Education	Secretary of State for Education	Lucy Powell	5 November 2024
Richard Holden; MP for Basildon and Billericay	Shadow Secretary of State for Transport	Secretary of State for Transport	Heidi Alexander	22 July 2025
Rebecca Paul; MP for Reigate	Shadow Secretary of State for Digital, Culture, Media and Sport	Secretary of State for Digital, Culture, Media and Sport	Lisa Nandy	31 August 2026
Harriet Cross; MP for Gordon and Buchan	Shadow Secretary of State for Scotland	Secretary of State for Scotland	Douglas Alexander	31 August 2026
Mims Davies; MP for East Grinstead and Uckfield	Shadow Secretary of State for Wales	Secretary of State for Wales	Stephen Kinnock	5 November 2024
Joy Morrissey; MP for Beaconsfield	Shadow Secretary of State for Women and Equalities	Minister for Women and Equalities	Bridget Phillipson	31 August 2026
Kevin Hollinrake; MP for Thirsk and Malton	Chairman of the Conservative Party; Shadow Minister without Portfolio	Chair of the Labour Party	Bridget Phillipson	22 July 2025
Attending Shadow Cabinet
Rebecca Harris; MP for Castle Point	Opposition Chief Whip in the House of Commons	Parliamentary Secretary to the Treasury; Government Chief Whip in the House of Commons	Anneliese Midgley	5 November 2024
Richard Fuller; MP for North East Bedfordshire	Shadow Chief Secretary to the Treasury	Chief Secretary to the Treasury	Emma Reynolds	5 November 2024
David Wolfson; Life peer	Shadow Attorney General for England and Wales	Attorney General for England and Wales	Ellie Reeves	5 November 2024
Neil O'Brien; MP for Harborough, Oadby and Wigston	Shadow Minister for Policy Renewal	Relevant minister		22 July 2025

== See also ==
- His Majesty's Most Loyal Opposition (United Kingdom)
- Official Opposition frontbench
- List of British shadow cabinets
- List of shadow holders of the Great Offices of State
- Cabinet of the United Kingdom
