= Mitchison =

Mitchison may refer to:

- Avrion Mitchison (1928–2022), British zoologist and immunologist
- Denis Mitchison (1919–2018), British bacteriologist
- Gilbert Mitchison, Baron Mitchison, known as Dick Mitchison (1894–1970), British Labour politician
- Graeme Mitchison (1944–2018), Cambridge mathematician and scientist
- Murdoch Mitchison (1922–2011), British zoologist, son of the Labour politician Dick Mitchison
- Naomi Mitchison (1897–1999), Scottish novelist and poet
- Rosalind Mitchison (1919–2002), historian of Scotland who specialised in social history
- Tim Mitchison, British systems biologist
