= Wrong (disambiguation) =

A wrong is an act that is illegal or immoral.

Wrong may also refer to:

- Civil wrong, a legal term
- Wrong (film), a 2012 comedy directed by Quentin Dupieux
- Wrong (album), by Nomeansno, 1989

== Songs ==
- "Wrong" (Depeche Mode song), 2009
- "Wrong" (Everything but the Girl song), 1996
- "Wrong" (Kimberley Locke song), 2004
- "Wrong" (Lindsey Buckingham song), 1992
- "Wrong" (Luh Kel song), 2019
- "Wrong" (Waylon Jennings song), 1990
- "Wrong" (Zayn song), 2016
- "Wrong", by Eden from Vertigo, 2018
- "Wrong", by The Kid Laroi from F*ck Love, 2020
- "Wrong", by Louise from Heavy Love, 2020
- "Wrong", by Max from Hell's Kitchen Angel, 2016

== People with the surname ==
- Dennis Wrong (1923–2018), American sociologist
- George MacKinnon Wrong (1860–1948), Canadian clergyman and historian
- Humphrey Hume Wrong (1894–1954), Canadian ambassador to the United States
- Michela Wrong (born 1961), British journalist and author
- Oliver Wrong (1925–2012), British doctor and kidney researcher

== See also ==
- Error
- False (disambiguation)
