= 1962 in science fiction =

The year 1962 was marked, in science fiction, by the following events.

== Births and deaths ==
=== Births ===
- Suzanne Collins

== Literary releases ==
=== Novels ===
- A Clockwork Orange by Anthony Burgess
- Island by Aldous Huxley
- The Jewels of Aptor by Samuel R. Delany
- The Man in the High Castle by Philip K. Dick
- Memoirs of a Spacewoman by Naomi Mitchison

=== Short stories ===
- Gateway to Strangeness by Jack Vance
- My Son, the Physicist by Isaac Asimov

=== Children's books ===
- A Wrinkle in Time by Madeleine L'Engle

=== Comics ===
- Amazing Fantasy #15, the first appearance of Spider-Man, by Stan Lee and Steve Ditko
- Barbarella, by Jean-Claude Forest, begins serialization in France
- First appearance of Dr. Solar, Man of the Atom, published by Gold Key Comics
- First Appearance of The Hulk in Incredible Hulk #1, by Stan Lee and Jack Kirby
- First Appearance of Iron Man in Tales of Suspense #39 by Stan Lee, Larry Lieber and Don Heck
- First appearance of the Space Family Robinson, published by Gold Key Comics

== Movies ==
- The Brain that Wouldn't Die written and dir. by Joseph Green
- Invasion of the Star Creatures dir. by Bruno VeSota
- La Jetée written and dir. by Chris Marker - the source material for the film Twelve Monkeys
- King Kong vs. Godzilla dir. by Ishirō Honda

== Video games ==
- Spacewar!

== Awards ==
=== Hugo Awards, 1962 ===
- Best Novel: Stranger in a Strange Land by Robert A. Heinlein
- Best Short Story: Hothouse by Brian Aldiss
- Best Dramatic Presentation: The Twilight Zone
- Best Professional Magazine: Analog Science Fiction and Fact
- Best Professional Artist: Ed Emshwiller
- Best Fanzine: Warhoon
