= Liz Shore =

British doctor and civil servant (1927–2022)

Liz Shore CB

Deputy Chief Medical Officer for England
- In office 1977 – 1985
- Chief: Henry Yellowlees; Donald Acheson
- Succeeded by: Michael Abrams

Personal details
- Born: Elizabeth Catherine Wrong; 19 August 1927 Oxford, England
- Died: 20 February 2022 (aged 94) Penzance, Cornwall, England
- Spouse: Peter Shore (m.1948)
- Relations: Oliver Wrong (brother); Michela Wrong (niece)
- Children: 4
- Parent: Edward Murray Wrong (father)
- Education: Newnham College, Cambridge; Medical College of St Bartholomew's Hospital
- Occupation: General practitioner, civil servant

Elizabeth Catherine Shore, Lady Shore of Stepney, CB (née Wrong; 19 August 1927 – 20 February 2022) was a British general practitioner and civil servant who served as the Deputy Chief Medical Officer of the United Kingdom from 1977 to 1985. She introduced measures to encourage women doctors to return to work after having children, and support their promotion within the health service.

== Early life ==
Elizabeth Catherine Wrong was born in Oxford, England on 20 February 1927, to Rosalind and Edward Murray Wrong, both historians. Her father died when she was young and she was sent with two of her siblings to live with their grandfather in Canada. She returned to England at ten years old and attended Oxford High School and Cheltenham Ladies' College. She went on to graduate from Newnham College, Cambridge, before completing medical training at the Medical College of St Bartholomew's Hospital. She married Peter Shore, a Labour Party politician whom she had met at Cambridge, in 1948. They had four children together: Thomasina, Tacy, Piers and Crispin.

== Career ==
Shore began her career as a general practitioner in London and Harlow, Essex. She held public health posts with Hertfordshire County Council and then London County Council, before joining the Ministry of Health in Whitehall in 1962. When she was appointed Deputy Chief Medical Officer in 1977, one of her primary initiatives was to support women doctors to return to the medical workforce after having children and to encourage the progression of women doctors to more senior positions within the health service. She was also involved in restructuring the National Health Service to increase the ratio of senior to junior doctors by adding additional consultant positions. She was appointed Companion of the Order of the Bath in 1980 for her contribution to health service and she was nominated for promotion to Chief Medical Officer in 1984. Although Shore was reported to be the strongest candidate, her nomination was vetoed by Prime Minister Margaret Thatcher due to Shore's husband's affiliation to the opposing Labour Party.

Disillusioned with the Conservatives, Shore stepped down from her position in 1985 and left civil service to become a dean of postgraduate medical education for the North West Thames Regional Health Authority. She was a member of the General Medical Council from 1989 to 1994 and was president of the Medical Women's Federation from 1990 to 1992.

== Later life and death ==
Liz Shore became Lady Shore of Stepney in 1997 when her husband was appointed to the House of Lords after holding a seat in parliament for over three decades, although she preferred the title "Dr" to "Lady". She retired to St Ives, Cornwall, and died at a care home in Penzance, on 20 February 2022, aged 94.
