= Bethnal Green and Stepney =

UK Parliament constituency (1983–1997, 2024 onwards)

- Borough constituency for the House of Commons
- Interactive map of boundaries from 2024
- Location within Greater London
- County: Greater London
- Electorate: 77,000 (March 2020)

Current constituency
- Created: 2024
- Member of Parliament: Rushanara Ali (Labour)
- Created from: Bethnal Green and Bow (the most part) & Poplar and Limehouse (smaller part)

1983–1997
- Seats: One
- Created from: Bethnal Green and Bow and Stepney and Poplar
- Replaced by: Bethnal Green and Bow (majority); Poplar and Canning Town (minority)

Bethnal Green and Stepney is a parliamentary constituency in Greater London, which returns one Member of Parliament (MP) to the House of Commons of the Parliament of the United Kingdom. Covering 6.8km^{2}, it is the smallest UK parliamentary constituency.

The seat first existed between 1983 and 1997 and was re-established under the 2023 review of Westminster constituencies which came into effect for the 2024 general election. In the intervening period, the seat was largely replaced by Bethnal Green and Bow.

Since 2024, the constituency has been represented by Rushanara Ali who was previously MP for Bethnal Green and Bow from 2010 to 2024.

== Constituency profile ==
The constituency is located in the East End of London within the Borough of Tower Hamlets. It contains the areas of Bethnal Green, Stepney, Whitechapel and parts of Limehouse.

Previously an impoverished area, this part of London was rebuilt and developed after the Blitz of World War II. Compared to the rest of London, residents are generally younger, more deprived and considerably less likely to own a house or car. Bethnal Green and Stepney contains the UK's largest community of Bangladeshis, who make up 42% of the constituency's population.

At the most recent borough council election in 2022, voters in the constituency were divided between the Labour Party and the local Aspire party. An estimated 70% of voters supported remaining in the European Union in the 2016 referendum, one of the highest rates in the country.

== History ==
In its first incarnation, from 1983 to its abolition in 1997, the constituency was only ever represented by the former cabinet minister Peter Shore, who held the seat for the Labour Party. Shore was noted for his opposition to the United Kingdom's entry into the European Economic Community.

In 1981, 24% of the constituency were non-White. The constituency had the highest concentration of those born in Bangladesh (11.7% of the population) in 1981.

== Boundaries ==
=== 1983–1997 ===
The constituency was made up of nine electoral wards of the London Borough of Tower Hamlets: Holy Trinity, Redcoat, St Dunstan's, St James', St Katharine's, St Mary's, St Peter's, Spitalfields, and Weavers. It was abolished in 1997, and largely replaced by the larger Bethnal Green and Bow constituency, in line with the Boundary Commission's recommendation that one seat should be lost in the paired boroughs of Tower Hamlets and Newham. 297 electors moved to the new Cities of London and Westminster constituency.

=== 2024–present ===
Further to the 2023 boundary review, the composition of the constituency is as follows (as they existed on 1 December 2020):

- The London Borough of Tower Hamlets wards of: Bethnal Green; St. Dunstan’s; St. Peter’s; Shadwell; Spitalfields & Banglatown; Stepney Green; Weavers; Whitechapel.

Apart from Shadwell and a small part of Whitechapel ward, previously part of Poplar and Limehouse, the constituency replaced Bethnal Green and Bow – excluding Bow, which was included in the newly created seat of Stratford and Bow. It is the smallest constituency in the UK by geographical area.

== Members of Parliament ==
Election	Member	Party
1983	Peter Shore	Labour
1997	constituency abolished: see Bethnal Green and Bow	
2024	Rushanara Ali	Labour

== Elections ==
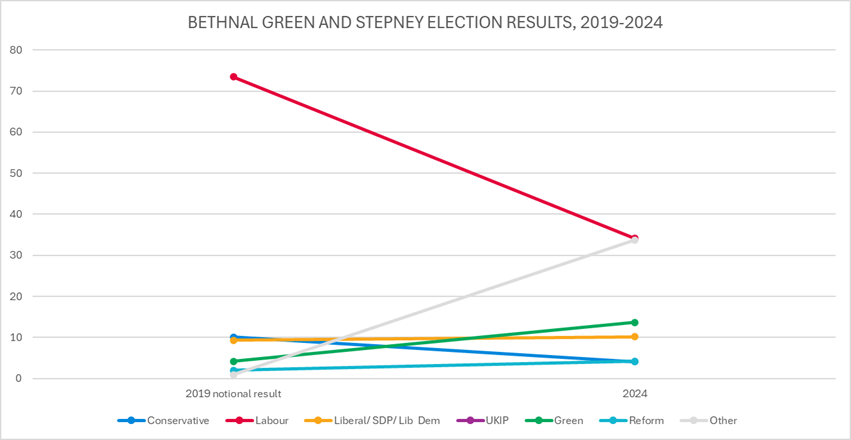
Election results 2019-2024

=== Elections in the 2020s ===
General election 2024: Bethnal Green and Stepney
Party	Candidate	Votes	%	±%
Labour	Rushanara Ali	15,896	34.1	▼39.4
Independent	Ajmal Masroor	14,207	30.5	new
Green	Phoebe Gill	6,391	13.7	▲9.5
Liberal Democrats	Rabina Khan	4,777	10.2	▲0.9
Reform	Peter Sceats	1,964	4.2	▲2.2
Conservative	Oscar Reaney	1,920	4.1	▼6.0
Animal Welfare	Vanessa Hudson	348	0.7	▼0.2
Independent	Sham Uddin	325	0.7	new
Independent	Md Somon Ahmed	315	0.7	new
Independent	Reggie Adams	271	0.6	new
SDP	Jon Mabbutt	233	0.5	new
Majority		1,689	3.6	▼59.8
Turnout		46,647	56.9	▼8.0
Registered electors		81,922		
Labour hold				

=== Elections in the 2010s ===
2019 notional result (Note: Estimate of the 2019 general election result as if the revised boundaries recommended under the 2023 boundary review were in place)
Party	Vote	%
Labour	36,720	73.5
Conservative	5,065	10.1
Liberal Democrats	4,634	9.3
Green	2,101	4.2
Brexit Party	992	2.0
Others	439	0.9
Majority	31,655	63.4
Turnout	49,951	64.9
Electorate	77,000	

=== Elections in the 1990s ===
General election 1992: Bethnal Green and Stepney
Party	Candidate	Votes	%	±%
Labour	Peter Shore	20,350	55.8	+7.5
Liberal Democrats	Jeremy Shaw	8,120	22.3	−9.5
Conservative	Jane Emmerson	6,507	17.9	−1.3
BNP	Richard Edmonds	1,310	3.6	New
Communist (PCC)	Stanley Kelsey	156	0.4	−0.3
Majority		12,230	33.5	+17.0
Turnout		36,443	65.5	+7.9
Labour hold		Swing	+8.6	

=== Elections in the 1980s ===
General election 1987: Bethnal Green and Stepney
Party	Candidate	Votes	%	±%
Labour	Peter Shore	15,490	48.3	−2.7
Liberal	Jeremy Shaw	10,206	31.8	+1.4
Conservative	Olga Maitland	6,176	19.2	+5.2
Communist	Sarah Gasquoine	232	0.7	−0.1
Majority		5,284	16.5	−4.1
Turnout		32,104	57.6	+1.9
Labour hold		Swing		

General election 1983: Bethnal Green and Stepney
Party	Candidate	Votes	%	±%
Labour	Peter Shore	15,740	51.0	
Liberal	Stephen Charters	9,382	30.4	
Conservative	Demitri Argyropulo	4,323	14.0	
National Front	Victor Clark	800	2.6	
Communist	J. Rees	243	0.8	
Independent	B. N. Chaudhuri	214	0.7	
Independent	P. J. Mahoney	136	0.4	
Majority		6,358	20.6	
Turnout		30,838	55.7	
Labour win (new seat)				

== See also ==
- List of parliamentary constituencies in London
