= Bethnal Green (disambiguation) =

Bethnal Green is an area of East London, England.

Bethnal Green can also refer to:

- Bethnal Green (London County Council constituency), former constituency between 1949 and 1965
- Bethnal Green (UK Parliament constituency), former constituency between 1950 and 1974
- Bethnal Green (ward), renamed Bethnal Green East in 2022
- Metropolitan Borough of Bethnal Green
- Bethnal Green tube station, scene of a serious disaster in 1943
- Bethnal Green railway station
