= Right (disambiguation) =

A right is a legal or moral entitlement or permission.

Right or rights may also refer to:

- Right, synonym of true or accurate, opposite of wrong
- Morally right, opposite of morally wrong
- Right (direction), the relative direction opposite of left
- Right-wing politics, in general or a political party associated with right-wing politics
- "Right" (song), a song by David Bowie from the album Young Americans, 1975
- "Right", a song by Mac Miller from the album Circles, 2020
- "Right…", a song by Moka Only from the album I'm Delighted, 2016
- "Right?", a song by Hinatazaka46 from the album Myakuutsu Kanjō, 2023
- "Right?", a song by Mammoth from the album Mammoth II, 2023
- Rights (film), 2007 Filipino film

== Political parties ==
- The Right (Italy) (Italian: La Destra), a political party in Italy
- The Right (Germany) (German: Die Rechte), a political party in Germany
- The Right (France) (French: La Droite), a political party in France
- The Right (Sweden) (Swedish: Högern), previous name of the Moderate Party, a political party in Sweden
- The Right (Norway) (Nynorsk: Høgre), a political party in Norway
- Parempoolsed, a political party in Estonia

== See also ==
- Copyright
- Correct (disambiguation)
- Human rights
- Illegal (disambiguation)
- Legal (disambiguation)
- Left (disambiguation)
- Outline of rights
- Right precedence, a Jewish tradition to give precedence to the right side of things
- True (disambiguation)
- Wrong (disambiguation)
