= Right Party =

Right Party may refer to:

- The Right (Sweden), now the Moderate Party, a political party
- Right (Norway), or Conservative Party, a political party
- Right Party (South Korea), or Bareun Party, a 2016–2018 political party
- Right Party, a minor political party in the 1994 South African general election

== See also ==
- Right-wing politics
- Right (disambiguation)
