= Rosalind Mitchison =

Rosalind Mitchison FRSE
- Born: Rosalind Mary Wrong; 11 April 1919; Manchester, England
- Died: 19 September 2002 (aged 83)
- Spouse: Murdoch Mitchison (m. 1947)
- Children: 4

Academic background
- Education: Dragon School
- Alma mater: Lady Margaret Hall, Oxford

Academic work
- Discipline: Historian
- Sub-discipline: Modern history; Scottish history; social history; history of sexuality
- Institutions: University of Manchester; University of Edinburgh; University of Glasgow

Rosalind Mary Mitchison FRSE (née Wrong; 11 April 1919 – 19 September 2002) was a 20th-century English historian and academic who specialised in Scottish social history. She was affectionately known as "Rowy" Mitchison.

== Life ==
Rosalind Mary Wrong was born in Manchester. Her father, Edward Murray Wrong (1889–1928), and his father, George MacKinnon Wrong, were both historians. Her mother was Rosalind Wrong was also a historian and was the daughter of Arthur Smith, master of Balliol College, Oxford; after Edward's death, she married Sir Henry Clay, becoming Rosalind, Lady Clay. Her brother was Oliver Wrong.

She was educated at Dragon School in Oxford then studied history at Lady Margaret Hall and went to the University of Manchester as an assistant lecturer, working under Sir Lewis Namier, in 1943.

In 1953 her husband was appointed to a professorship at the University of Edinburgh and they moved to Scotland. Mitchison taught history, initially part-time, at Edinburgh until 1957. In 1962 she began teaching at the University of Glasgow where she remained until 1967, latterly as a full-time lecturer. Her first work, Agricultural Sir John (1962), broke new ground in the history of 18th-century Scotland, hitherto mainly studied, when studied at all, from the perspective of the Acts of Union 1707 or the Scottish Enlightenment.

She returned to the University of Edinburgh in 1967 as a Reader, and was by 1981 Emeritus Professor of Social History, a post she held until 1986.

In 1994 she was elected a Fellow of the Royal Society of Edinburgh. Her proposers were T. C. Smout, D Stevenson, T. M. Devine, Michael Francis Oliver, Charles Kemball and D. E. R. Watt.

She died in hospital in Edinburgh on 19 September 2002.

== Family ==
In 1947, while Tutor at Lady Margaret Hall, she married zoologist John Murdoch Mitchison, son of Naomi Mitchison and Dick Mitchison. They had four children, three daughters and one son.

== Books and publications ==
- Agricultural Sir John. The life of Sir John Sinclair of Ulster 1754–1835 Geoffrey Bles 1962
- British population change since 1860 prepared for the Economic History Society Macmillan 1977
- Coping with Destitution: Poverty and Relief in Western Europe (Joanne Goodman Lecture) University of Toronto Press 1992 ISBN 0-8020-5912-0 ISBN 978-0-8020-5912-3
- Economy and society in Scotland and Ireland 1500–1939 edited by Rosalind Mitchison and Peter Roebuck John Donald 1988 ISBN 0-85976-171-1 ISBN 978-0-85976-171-0
- Essays in eighteenth-century history. From the English Historical Review / arranged by Rosalind Mitchison. Longmans Green & Co.1966
- Girls in trouble : sexuality and social control in rural Scotland, 1660–1780 with Leah Leneman. Scottish Cultural Press 1998 ISBN 1-898218-89-7 ISBN 978-1-898218-89-0
- History of Scotland Routledge 3rd revised edition 2002 ISBN 0-415-27880-5 ISBN 978-0-415-27880-5
- Life in Scotland Batsford 1978 ISBN 0-7134-1559-2 ISBN 978-0-7134-1559-9
- Lordship to patronage : Scotland 1603–1745. Edinburgh University Press 1990 ISBN 0-7486-0233-X ISBN 978-0-7486-0233-9
- Old Poor Law in Scotland : the experience of poverty, 1574–1845. Edinburgh University Press 2000 ISBN 0-7486-1344-7 ISBN 978-0-7486-1344-1
- People and society in Scotland. 1, 1760–1830 / edited by T.M. Devine and Rosalind Mitchison. John Donald 1988/2006 ISBN 978-0-85976-210-6
- Regional levels of Scottish illegitimacy, 1660–1770 1983
- Roots of nationalism studies in northern Europe edited by Rosalind Mitchison John Donald 1979/1980 ISBN 0-85976-058-8 ISBN 978-0-85976-058-4
- Scotland in the age of improvement : essays in Scottish history in the eighteenth century edited by N.T. Phillipson and Rosalind Mitchison. Edinburgh University Press New Edition 1997 ISBN 0-7486-0876-1 ISBN 978-0-7486-0876-8
- Sin in the city : sexuality and social control in urban Scotland, 1160–1780 with Leah Leneman Scottish Cultural Press 1998 ISBN 1-898218-90-0 ISBN 978-1-898218-90-6
- Why Scottish history matters editor, Rosalind Mitchison Saltire Society 1999 ISBN 0-85411-070-4 ISBN 978-0-85411-070-4

=== Sources ===
- Dalyell, Tam (21 September 2002), "Obituary: Professor Rosalind Mitchison - Pioneering social historian of Scotland", The Independent, archived from the original on 25 October 2010
- Morris, R. J. (4 October 2002), "Obituary:Rosalind Mitchison", The Guardian
- Fraser, W. Hamish (2003), "Rosalind Mitchison (1919–2002) and John Butt (1929–2002): An appreciation", Scottish Economic & Social History, 23: 1–6
