= Stepney and Poplar =

UK Parliament constituency (1974–1983)

- Former borough constituency for the House of Commons

February 1974–1983
- Seats: one
- Created from: Poplar and Stepney
- Replaced by: Bow & Poplar and Bethnal Green & Stepney

Stepney and Poplar was a parliamentary constituency in London, which returned one Member of Parliament (MP) to the House of Commons of the Parliament of the United Kingdom.

== History ==
It was created for the February 1974 general election, largely replacing the old Stepney constituency, and abolished for the 1983 general election, when it was partly replaced by the new Bethnal Green and Stepney constituency.

The constituency shared boundaries with the Stepney and Poplar electoral division for election of councillors to the Greater London Council at elections in 1973, 1977 and 1981.

== Boundaries ==
The London Borough of Tower Hamlets wards of Limehouse, Poplar East, Poplar Millwall, Poplar South, Poplar West, Redcoat, St Dunstan's, St Katharine's, St Mary's, and Shadwell.

== Members of Parliament ==
Election	Member	Party
Feb 1974	Peter Shore	Labour
1983	constituency abolished: see Bethnal Green and Stepney	

== Election results ==
General election 1979: Stepney and Poplar
Party	Candidate	Votes	%	±%
Labour	Peter Shore	19,576	62.6	−15.0
Conservative	Robert Hughes	6,561	21.0	+10.8
Liberal	Rif Winfield	2,234	7.2	−3.0
National Front	Victor Clarke	1,571	5.0	New
Independent Labour	Ted Johns	672	2.2	New
Communist	Kevin Halpin	413	1.3	−0.7
Workers Revolutionary	Peter Chappell	235	0.8	New
Majority		13,015	41.6	−25.8
Turnout		58,637	53.3	+1.8
Labour hold		Swing		

General election October 1974: Stepney and Poplar
Party	Candidate	Votes	%	±%
Labour	Peter Shore	24,159	77.6	−3.3
Conservative	Harry Greenway	3,183	10.2	−5.3
Liberal	F. W. Alexander	3,181	10.2	New
Communist	Kevin Halpin	617	2.0	New
Majority		20,976	67.4	+2.0
Turnout		60,458	51.5	−7.9
Labour hold		Swing		

General election February 1974: Stepney and Poplar
Party	Candidate	Votes	%	±%
Labour	Peter Shore	28,869	80.9	
Conservative	Harry Greenway	5,539	15.5	
Communist	Kevin Halpin	1,278	3.6	
Majority		23,330	65.4	
Turnout		60,045	59.4	
Labour win (new seat)				
