= Correctness =

Correct or Correctness may refer to:

- What is true
- Accurate; Error-free
- Correctness (computer science), in theoretical computer science
- Political correctness, a sociolinguistic concept
- Correct, Indiana, an unincorporated community in the United States

== See also ==
- Correct Craft, a U.S.-based builder of powerboats
- Correct sampling, a sampling scenario in Gy's sampling theory
- Right (disambiguation)
