= Murdoch Mitchison =

British zoologist (1922-2011)

Professor The Honourable Murdoch Mitchison FRS FRSE
- Murdoch Mitchison portrait by the Godfrey Argent Studio
- Born: 11 June 1922; Oxford, England
- Died: 17 March 2011 (aged 88); Edinburgh, Scotland
- Resting place: John Murdoch Mitchison
- Education: Winchester College, Hampshire, England
- Alma mater: Trinity College, Cambridge
- Occupation: zoologist
- Spouse: Rosalind Mary Wrong (m. 1947; died 2002)
- Children: 4
- Parents: Gilbert Richard Mitchison (father); Naomi Haldane (mother)
- Relatives: J.B.S. Haldane (uncle); John Scott Haldane (grandfather); Denis Mitchison (brother); Avrion Mitchison (brother); Edward Murray Wrong (father-in-law)

John Murdoch Mitchison (11 June 1922, Oxford – 17 March 2011, Edinburgh) was a British zoologist.

== Background ==
=== Family ===
Mitchison was the son of the Labour politician Dick Mitchison and his wife, the writer Naomi (née Haldane). The biologist J.B.S. Haldane was his uncle, and the physiologist John Scott Haldane was his maternal grandfather. His elder brother was the bacteriologist Denis Mitchison, and his younger brother was the zoologist Avrion Mitchison. His wife was the historian Rosalind Mitchison.

=== Education ===
Mitchison went to Winchester College and Trinity College, Cambridge, later becoming Professor of Zoology at Edinburgh University in 1963 after working there for a decade. He was elected a fellow of the Royal Society of London in 1978.

== Career ==
Considered a pioneer in the area of cellular biology, Mitchison developed the yeast Schizosaccharomyces pombe as a model system to study the mechanisms and kinetics of growth and the cell cycle. He was an academic advisor to the 2001 Nobel Prize in Physiology recipient Paul Nurse.
