= Peter Sceats =

British businessman and political activist

Peter Sceats is a British businessman and political activist associated with the coal and energy trading sector.

A former broker, trader and risk manager, he has worked in international energy markets for several decades and later in litigation support as an expert witness and mediator. He publishes industry commentary, including the Sceats Coal Report.

He has authored books on coal markets and related subjects.

== Early life ==
Sceats was born in Woodford, London. He was educated in Highgate, Chingford and Highams Park.

He began his career in commodity trading at J.H. Rayner/S.W. Berisford at the age of 18.

== Career ==
Sceats has worked in coal trading and has been associated with early proposals for coal derivatives markets.

He has also worked in dispute resolution and is a mediator accredited by the Centre for Effective Dispute Resolution (CEDR).

Sceats has published commentary on coal markets and energy procurement and has advised companies on coal risk and sourcing.

== Political activity ==
Sceats supported the Vote Leave campaign during the 2016 United Kingdom European Union membership referendum.

He stood as an independent candidate in the 2016 Brentwood Borough Council election in the Brizes and Doddinghurst ward, finishing second.

In March 2021, he authored a petition proposing a cap on publicly funded salaries in the United Kingdom.

He was the Reform UK candidate for Bethnal Green and Stepney in the 2024 United Kingdom general election, finishing fifth with 1,964 votes.

He was interviewed as a candidate during the campaign.

== Personal life ==
Sceats lives in Essex and Switzerland and has three children.
