= J. S. S. Martin =

Military doctor in the Indian Medical Service

Major-General John Simson Stuart Martin CSI (18 June 1888 – 24 December 1973) was a Scottish doctor in the Indian Medical Service. He served during both World Wars.

Born in Stornoway, he was educated at Oban High School, Rockhampton Grammar School (Queensland) and the University of Edinburgh. He was commissioned into the Indian Medical Service in 1912. He served in Mesopotamia from November 1914 until April 1916, when he was taken prisoner by the Turks at the fall of Kut. He was mentioned in despatches in 1916. By the time of the start of the Second World War, he was a Colonel, and was further promoted to substantive Major-General on 6 March 1943, retiring on 6 March 1945.

He latterly lived at Glendale, on the Isle of Skye. He died at Gesto Hospital on the island.

His daughter Lorna is married to immunologist Avrion Mitchison.
