= Do Not Disturb (book) =

2021 book by Michela Wrong

- 1st UK edition
- Author: Michela Wrong
- Publisher: HarperCollins, Perseus Books Group
- Publication date: 2021
- Pages: 512
- ISBN: 978-0-00-823887-2 (hardcover)
- Website: HarperCollins Publishers

Do Not Disturb: The Story of a Political Murder and an African Regime Gone Bad is a 2021 book by British journalist Michela Wrong, published by Fourth Estate and PublicAffairs. The book focuses on the 2014 murder of Rwandan defector Patrick Karegeya, for which the Rwandan government denied responsibility.

== Background ==
Michela Wrong is a British journalist who reported on Africa for over 20 years as a foreign correspondent for different news outlets including Reuters and Financial Times. Wrong says that she initially believed the conventional Rwandan Patriotic Front (RPF) account, but after the 1998 assassination of former interior minister Seth Sendashonga, "I realised I no longer believed most of the key ‘truths’ upon which [Kagame’s RPF] built its account." Wrong says she "never felt so personally at risk" as when writing the book. The book was published in March and April 2021 by Fourth Estate and PublicAffairs. In 2023 a French translation was brought out by Max Milo Éditions.

== Content ==
The book focuses on the 2014 assassination of Patrick Karegeya, who was killed in a hotel room in South Africa; the killers left a "do not disturb" sign on the door. The Rwandan government denied responsibility for his killing, but President Paul Kagame, a childhood friend of Karegeya, stated, "I actually wish Rwanda did it." Kagame also told a national prayer breakfast: "Whoever is against our country will not escape our wrath. The person will face consequences." The book is largely based on interviews, many with former members of Kagame's inner circle.

Wrong also covers historical background on Rwandan history. For example, she discusses the assassination of Juvénal Habyarimana and Cyprien Ntaryamira that triggered the Rwandan genocide and debates who was responsible for it.

Wrong criticizes Kagame, accusing him of being a brutal dictator and comparing him to Soviet secret police chief Lavrentiy Beria. Karegeya is one of a large number of people who fell out with the Rwandan government and met unnatural deaths. Rwanda's assassinations have drawn less international criticism than the extraterritorial killing of dissidents by Russia and other countries. Wrong discusses the reasons why Rwanda's regime has maintained close relations with the international community and aid donors, arguing that acceptance of strongmen to keep Africans in order is a form of racism. She also argues: "There’s something profoundly uncomfortable about insisting that a government which has a deteriorating human rights record and has committed egregious war crimes is a worthy recipient of aid because it performs well on aid metrics yet is busy killing journalists and rounding up and disappearing critics."

== Reception ==
In The Times, Ian Birrell called the book an "absorbing Shakespearean saga" and says that Wrong "exposes a more complex" narrative than conventional depictions of Rwanda, "showing the savagery that lies beneath the surface of a regime hailed by many Western admirers". In The New York Times, Howard W. French stated that the book is "perhaps the most ambitious attempt yet to tell the dark story of Rwanda and the region’s deeply intertwined tragedies for a general audience". Peter Beaumont in the Guardian states "Do Not Disturb represents one of the most far-reaching historical revisions of Kagame and his regime." According to Reuters the book is "deeply researched" and "Michela Wrong’s exposé of the deadly workings of the Kagame regime, will make uncomfortable reading for his international cheerleaders." In New Statesman, Martin Fletcher states that Wrong "rips off the regime’s veil of respectability to expose the horrors beneath".

In Current Affairs, Alex Park says that the book exposes "a remarkable catalog of lies the R.P.F. sold to western apologists and the realities they covered up". The Economist states that Wrong "weaves her tale of woe in remorseless, compelling detail" in her "massively documented and footnoted book": "if you believe even half of this book", the reader must reject the contention of some that Kagame is a "progressive dictator". According to Tom Zoellner, who co-wrote a book with Rwandan dissident Paul Rusesabagina, the book is "myth-busting", "explosive and devastatingly convincing". A Financial Times article written by Alec Russell says that Do Not Disturb is "a remarkable, chilling and long overdue book" and "an extraordinarily brave piece of reporting" that will prompt reassessment of the Rwandan government. The Washington Post says Wrong, "knits all these critiques together in a way that is comprehensive and compelling — built around the Cain and Abel tale of two soul brothers who achieve political power only to be torn apart by jealousy and pride".

Former British diplomat Edward Clay says that Wrong's research is thorough and she explored under-explored incidents in Rwanda's history, leading to "fascinating insights into some of the mysteries that have remained unexplained for the last 26 years". Rwandan defector Theogene Rudasingwa also recommended the book.

Colgate University academic Susan Thomson said that it was "one of the best books on Rwanda I’ve read in a long time" and "a masterclass in investigative journalism". In Foreign Affairs Phil Clark argues that Wrong is insufficiently critical of the Rwanda National Congress as well as Karegaya and disagrees that foreign aid should be cut over human rights violations and assassinations.

The book was blurbed by John le Carré and Desmond Tutu.

France's Marianne magazine said the book was "remarkably written", "as much an account of the insane ambition of a man and his followers as a manual of political anthropology allowing a better understanding of the reasons, both deep and superficial, for the Rwandan tragedy."

The book was published in French with the title "Assassins sans frontières".
