= Peter Shore =

British politician (1924–2001)

The Right Honourable The Lord Shore of Stepney PC
- Shore in 1973

Shadow Leader of the House of Commons
- In office 31 October 1983 – 13 July 1987
- Leader: Neil Kinnock
- Preceded by: John Silkin
- Succeeded by: Frank Dobson

Shadow Secretary of State for Trade and Industry
- In office 31 October 1983 – 26 October 1984
- Leader: Neil Kinnock
- Preceded by: Peter Archer (Trade); Stanley Orme (Industry)
- Succeeded by: John Smith

Shadow Chancellor of the Exchequer
- In office 8 December 1980 – 31 October 1983
- Leader: Michael Foot
- Preceded by: Denis Healey
- Succeeded by: Roy Hattersley

Shadow Foreign Secretary
- In office 14 July 1979 – 8 December 1980
- Leader: James Callaghan
- Preceded by: Francis Pym
- Succeeded by: Denis Healey

Shadow Secretary of State for the Environment
- In office 4 May 1979 – 14 July 1979
- Leader: James Callaghan
- Preceded by: Michael Heseltine
- Succeeded by: Roy Hattersley

Secretary of State for the Environment
- In office 8 April 1976 – 4 May 1979
- Prime Minister: James Callaghan
- Preceded by: Tony Crosland
- Succeeded by: Michael Heseltine

Secretary of State for Trade
- In office 4 March 1974 – 8 April 1976
- Prime Minister: Harold Wilson
- Preceded by: Peter Walker (Trade and Industry)
- Succeeded by: Edmund Dell

Shadow Minister for Europe
- In office 19 October 1971 – 19 April 1972
- Leader: Harold Wilson
- Preceded by: Harold Lever
- Succeeded by: Michael Foot

Minister without Portfolio
- In office 6 October 1969 – 19 June 1970
- Prime Minister: Harold Wilson
- Preceded by: George Thomson
- Succeeded by: The Lord Drumalbyn

Secretary of State for Economic Affairs
- In office 29 August 1967 – 6 October 1969
- Prime Minister: Harold Wilson
- Preceded by: Michael Stewart
- Succeeded by: Anthony Crosland (Minister of State)

Member of Parliament for Bethnal Green and Stepney Stepney (1964–1974) Stepney and Poplar (1974–1983)
- In office 15 October 1964 – 8 April 1997
- Preceded by: Stoker Edwards
- Succeeded by: Oona King

Member of the House of Lords
- Lord Temporal
- Life peerage 5 June 1997 – 24 September 2001

Personal details
- Born: Peter David Shore; 20 May 1924 Great Yarmouth, England
- Died: 24 September 2001 (aged 77) London, England
- Party: Labour
- Spouse: Liz Wrong (m. 1948)
- Children: 4
- Education: King's College, Cambridge

Peter David Shore, Baron Shore of Stepney, PC (20 May 1924 – 24 September 2001) was a British Labour Party politician who served as a Cabinet minister under Harold Wilson and James Callaghan. A prominent figure on the Labour left during the 1970s and 1980s, Shore was best known for his opposition to British membership of the European Economic Community and his unsuccessful candidacy for the Labour Party leadership in 1983. He represented the constituency of Stepney (later Stepney and Poplar, then Bethnal Green and Stepney) in the House of Commons from 1964 to 1997, before being elevated to the peerage.

Born in Liverpool and educated at King's College, Cambridge, Shore joined the Labour Party in 1948 and worked as head of the Research Department at Transport House from 1959 to 1964. He entered Parliament in the 1964 general election and quickly rose through the ranks, serving as Parliamentary Private Secretary to Prime Minister Harold Wilson from 1965 to 1966. Shore held several senior ministerial positions, including Secretary of State for Economic Affairs (1967–1969), Secretary of State for Trade (1974–1976), and Secretary of State for the Environment (1976–1979). A committed social democrat and advocate of national economic planning, he was also a key figure in Labour's internal debates over nationalisation and workers' control.

Shore's opposition to European integration became the defining feature of his political career. He was a leading voice in the 'No' campaign during the 1975 referendum on continued EEC membership and remained a committed Eurosceptic throughout his time in Parliament. His 1983 leadership bid, which emphasised traditional Labour values and opposition to the European project, placed third behind Neil Kinnock and Roy Hattersley. After leaving the Commons in 1997, he continued to oppose further European integration from the House of Lords until his death in 2001 at the age of 77.

His idiosyncratic left-wing nationalism led to comparison with the French politician Jean-Pierre Chevènement. He was described in an obituary by the Conservative journalist Patrick Cosgrave as "Between Harold Wilson and Tony Blair, the only possible Labour Party leader of whom a Conservative leader had cause to walk in fear" and, along with Enoch Powell, "the most captivating rhetorician of the age".

== Early life ==
Born in Great Yarmouth, Norfolk, Shore was the son of a Merchant Navy captain and was brought up in a middle-class environment. He attended Quarry Bank High School in Liverpool and, from there, went to King's College, Cambridge, to read History as an exhibitioner, where he was a member of the Cambridge Apostles, a secret society with an elite membership. During the later stages of World War II he served in the Royal Air Force, spending most of his time in India.

== Political career ==
He had specialised in political economy during part of his degree and joined the Labour Party in 1948. He spent the 1950s working for the party and, after two unsuccessful Parliamentary contests at St Ives in 1950 and Halifax in 1959, he was appointed as Head of the Labour Party's Research Department and took charge of the renewal of party policy following its third successive defeat in 1959. Shore was only briefly a follower of Hugh Gaitskell; his adherence to the Campaign for Nuclear Disarmament from 1958 led to a breach in relations for several years.

He became close to Harold Wilson after Wilson had been elected as party leader, and was the main author of the Labour Party manifesto for the 1964 general election. At the last minute, he was selected to fight for the safe seat of Stepney in the election, which he easily won.

After only a short spell on the backbenches, Wilson chose Shore to be Parliamentary Private Secretary, responsible for liaising between the Prime Minister and Labour MPs, though Denis Healey termed him "Harold's lapdog". Shore was responsible for drafting the 1966 and 1970 election manifestos. Shore's job as Wilson's PPS kept them in close contact and in August 1967, Shore became a member of the Cabinet as Secretary of State for Economic Affairs.

=== In government ===
This Department had been created by Wilson to undertake long-term planning of the economy. Shore declared immediately his belief in state-controlled economic planning, together with the regulation of prices and wages. Early in 1968, the responsibility for prices and incomes was transferred to another department. The Treasury had never approved of the creation of the Department for Economic Affairs and began reasserting its influence, depriving it of any significant power. The department was wound up in October 1969. At the same time, Shore sided with those in cabinet who were opposed to Barbara Castle's White Paper, In Place of Strife. In a conversation with Richard Crossman at the time, Wilson was frustrated with Shore: "I over-promoted him. He's no good".

Shore was retained in the Cabinet as a Minister without Portfolio and Deputy Leader of the House of Commons. He played a key part, behind the scenes, in planning the Labour Party's unsuccessful 1970 general election campaign. In opposition, Shore was appointed as spokesman on Europe, taking the lead in opposing Edward Heath's application to join the European Economic Community. Shore had already become convinced that membership of the EEC would be a disaster because it would stop the British government from taking necessary economic action. However, due to organisation by pro-EEC Labour backbenchers, Heath was able to steer his policy successfully through Parliament.

=== EEC ===
When Wilson returned to government in 1974, Shore was appointed as Secretary of State for Trade. His term in office was dominated by the renegotiation of the terms of British membership of the EEC, a pledge contained in the Labour manifesto as a preparation for a national referendum on membership; this compromise had reunited the Labour Party on the issue. Shore participated in the discussions without believing that any new terms would be acceptable, and during the referendum, he joined with other anti-EEC politicians in opposing membership.

The results of the 1975 Referendum, giving a two-to-one majority in favour of remaining a member of the EEC, damaged Shore along with the other 'dissenting ministers'. His inclination to support an autarkic economy ruled him out of consideration as a new Chancellor of the Exchequer, but Shore was moved to Secretary of State for the Environment by new Prime Minister James Callaghan in 1976. This move was a promotion but involved him in considerable political controversy. He called on local authorities to cut spending and waste, and criticised the trade unions representing local authority staff for failure to support modernisation. Shore also launched a campaign to revitalise the inner cities of Britain.

=== Nuclear deterrent ===
Shore became a fervent advocate of the British nuclear deterrent for the last three decades of his life, but in 1958 he had been an active member of CND. In his 1966 book Entitled to Know, he was critical of the Nassau Agreement with the United States under which Britain's nuclear submarines were, except in a national emergency, permanently assigned to NATO. Regarding dependence on NATO as limiting Britain's freedom of action, Shore negatively compared Britain's nuclear strategy to that of France:

For if such a policy is like General de Gaulle's, based upon a deliberate and far-reaching politico-military strategy of national independence, past disengagement from NATO and détente in Europe, it merits the most careful examination. But, of these broader aims, there was not a whisper or suggestion from Tory Ministers. ...after the cancellation of Blue Streak...that, failing the development of a major new British weapons system, we hadn't, and could not in future possess, a genuine independent nuclear capacity.

Shore had always been implacably opposed to any suggestion of British participation in the Vietnam War, both as PPS and in Cabinet he had encouraged Wilson to distance himself more explicitly from American foreign policy. By the mid-1970s, while continuing to condemn American foreign policy in Vietnam and Chile, he had become more supportive of NATO and the United States.

=== Labour leadership candidate ===
When the Labour Party went into opposition in 1979, Shore was made Shadow Foreign Secretary, having recanted on his previous support for CND. He was persuaded to stand as a candidate in the election of a new party leader in November 1980 by Michael Foot, who thought he was the best-placed soft-left candidate to defeat Denis Healey. The Times branded him the initial favourite. However, Shore came bottom of the poll with 32 votes when Foot was himself persuaded to stand. Foot then made him Shadow Chancellor where his support for interventionist measures met with Foot's approval; party policy also became opposed to EEC membership, which suited Shore well. In the early 1980s, Shore's patriotic tendencies were again evident when he first of all strongly opposed the Conservative Government's attempts to hand over the Falkland Islands to Argentina, then supported Margaret Thatcher over the Falklands War of 1982.

=== Shadow Cabinet ===
He fought for the leadership again after Foot resigned, but obtained a dismal vote of 3%, being unsupported by any Constituency Labour Party. Shore served as Shadow Leader of the House of Commons for four years under Neil Kinnock but his influence with the leadership was negligible and he was not re-elected to the Shadow cabinet in 1985. He stood down from the front bench in 1987 and thereafter served on the Foreign Affairs Select Committee, devoting himself to European Union questions. Edward Pearce wrote in his Guardian obituary of Shore that "he had now become a right-wing figure, cluckingly approved of by Conservatives".

Tony Blair selected him as a senior Labour statesman as his nominee for the Committee on Standards in Public Life when it was set up in 1994.

=== Backbenches and retirement ===
After several attempts in his constituency party to deselect him, he finally stood down from the House of Commons at the 1997 general election, and in the dissolution honours he was made a life peer, being created Baron Shore of Stepney, of Stepney in the London Borough of Tower Hamlets on 5 June 1997.

In contrast to Pearce's assertion that Shore had become a "right-wing figure", Chris Mullin quoted Shore in 1997 as saying: "I still believe in state intervention, a good measure of equality, full employment." Mullin described Shore as alienated from New Labour and quoted his criticism: "I like Tony Blair. I think he is probably right about wanting to put a certain distance between the party and the unions, but I'm offended by New Labour's constant repudiation of our past."

His book Separate Ways (2000) advocated a multi-speed Europe, with some countries as merely associate members, so as to allow the centre to forge a political union at its own pace.

== Personal life and death ==
On 27 September 1948, Shore married Dr Elizabeth Catherine Wrong, daughter of the Canadian historian Edward Murray Wrong. Known as Liz, she was the Deputy Chief Medical Officer of England from 1977 to 1985, and in this role and later positions she championed women's career progression in medicine. They had two daughters, Thomasina and Tacy, both retired teachers, and two sons, Crispin, who is Professor of Social Anthropology at Goldsmiths, University of London, and Piers, who died in 1977.

On 12 July 2001, Lord Shore collapsed in the House of Lords shortly after speaking in a debate on monetary policy. He received resuscitation and was taken to St Thomas' Hospital. He died there from chronic obstructive pulmonary disease and heart disease on 24 September 2001, aged 77.

== Bibliography ==
- Entitled to Know, MacGibbon & Kee (1966) ISBN 978-0-2616-3132-8
- Europe: the way back, Fabian Society (1973)
- Leading the Left, Weidenfeld & Nicolson (1993) ISBN 978-0-2978-1096-4
- Separate Ways, Duckworth (2000) ISBN 978-0-7156-2972-7

== Archives ==
- Catalogue of the Shore papers at the Archives Division of the London School of Economics.

Parliament of the United Kingdom
Preceded by Stoker Edwards	Member of Parliament for Stepney; 1964–1974	Constituency abolished
New constituency	Member of Parliament for Stepney and Poplar; 1974–1983	Constituency abolished
New constituency	Member of Parliament for Bethnal Green and Stepney; 1983–1997	Constituency abolished
Political offices
Preceded by Michael Stewart	Secretary of State for Economic Affairs; 1967–1969	Position abolished
Preceded by George Thomson	Minister without Portfolio; 1969–1970	Succeeded by The Lord Drumalbyn
Preceded by Harold Lever	Shadow Minister for Europe; 1971–1972	Succeeded by Michael Foot
Preceded by Peter Walker as Secretary of State for Trade and Industry	Secretary of State for Trade; 1974–1976	Succeeded by Edmund Dell
Preceded by Tony Crosland	Secretary of State for the Environment; 1976–1979	Succeeded by Michael Heseltine
Preceded by Michael Heseltine	Shadow Secretary of State for the Environment; 1979	Succeeded by Roy Hattersley
Preceded by Francis Pym	Shadow Foreign Secretary; 1979–1980	Succeeded by Denis Healey
Preceded by Denis Healey	Shadow Chancellor of the Exchequer; 1980–1983	Succeeded by Roy Hattersley
Preceded by Peter Archer as Shadow Secretary of State for Trade	Shadow Secretary of State for Trade and Industry; 1983–1984	Succeeded by John Smith
Preceded by Stan Orme as Shadow Secretary of State for Industry	Shadow Secretary of State for Trade and Industry; 1983–1984	Succeeded by John Smith
Preceded by John Silkin	Shadow Leader of the House of Commons; 1983–1987	Succeeded by Frank Dobson
Party political offices
Preceded by David Ginsburg	Secretary of the Research Department of the Labour Party; 1959–1964	Succeeded by Terry Pitt
Preceded by Arthur Blenkinsop	Chair of the Fabian Society; 1968–1969	Succeeded by Thomas Balogh
