= List of fellows of the Royal Society elected in 1967 =

This article lists fellows of the Royal Society elected in 1967.

== Fellows ==
1. Ernest James William Barrington
2. Sir Kenneth Lyon Blaxter
3. Eric Stuart Booth
4. Norman Adrian de Bruyne
5. Charles William Bunn
6. Sir Christopher Sydney Cockerell
7. Sir John Vivian Dacie
8. Frederick James Dent
9. Sir Charles Alexander Fleming
10. Sir Hugh Ford
11. Stephen Denis Garrett
12. Michael Anthony Grace
13. Emmeline Jean Hanson
14. Sir Alec Arnold Constantine Issigonis
15. Francis Edgar Jones
16. Raymond Urgel Lemieux
17. Sir Ieuan Maddock
18. Nicholas Avrion Mitchison
19. Joseph Arthur Colin Nicol
20. David Chilton Phillips, Baron Phillips of Ellesmere
21. Charles Henry Brian Priestley
22. Calyampudi Radhakrishna Rao
23. Sir Ralph Riley
24. Michael John Seaton
25. Norman Sheppard
26. David Henry Smyth
27. Franz Sondheimer
28. Sir Henry Peter Francis Swinnerton-Dyer
29. Douglas Frew Waterhouse
30. Richard Tecwyn Williams
31. Sir Alwyn Williams
32. John Michael Ziman

== Foreign members ==
1. Max Ludwig Henning Delbruck
2. John Franklin Enders
3. Robert Sanderson Mulliken
4. John Hasbrouck Van Vleck
