= Leah Leneman =

British-American historian (1944–1999)

- Leneman, c. 1990
- Born: Leah Leonora Leneman; March 3, 1944; DeKalb, Illinois, United States
- Died: December 26, 1999 (aged 55); Edinburgh, Scotland
- Citizenship: American, then British
- Education: University of Edinburgh
- Occupations: Historian, cookery writer
- Partner: Graham Sutton

Leah Leonora Leneman (3 March 1944 – 26 December 1999) was a British-American popular historian and cookery writer. She wrote about Scottish history including the struggle for women's suffrage.

== Biography ==
=== Early life and career ===
Leah Leneman was born in DeKalb, Illinois. Her father David was an artist from Warsaw, her mother Lisa was a singer from Vienna; both had escaped anti-semitic persecution in Europe by circuitous routes. They met in New York and were making their way to California when Leah Leneman inconveniently arrived midway. She grew up in Hollywood, Los Angeles, where David painted and ran several art studios, in a cosmopolitan multilingual household full of his artwork and painted furniture. Leneman was educated at Bnai Reuben first school, Bancroft Junior High then Hollywood High School, where she launched into acting. She hung around the studio gates with her camera and compiled a large album of personal snaps of the stars. Her pursuit of an acting career in the early 1960s took her to HB Studio in Greenwich Village, New York, under William Hickey, then to the Tower Theatre in Islington, London.

In London as a foreigner, Leneman could only take jobs for which no British worker was available. Fortunately, the city in the 1960s had labour shortages, plus a Jewish diaspora whose businessmen would vouch for her indispensability. After starting out as an usherette at the Odeon, Leicester Square, she had a series of temporary office jobs, then got a permanent job at a travel agency. She managed to get hired as a reservation clerk at BOAC, a forerunner to British Airways. This entitled her to flights for 10 percent of the economy class fare and she began to tour the world. By 1970 she was determined to live permanently in Britain and applied for citizenship: the police saw her passport full of stamps from India, Burma, Japan and beyond and were anxious to know if she was a communist. Thus Leneman became British, and was required to give up her US citizenship.

=== Career as historian and cookery writer ===
Influenced by the Vedanta movement of Hinduism, in 1963 Leneman became vegetarian and by 1970 a vegan. From her many travels she often contributed to The Vegetarian, the magazine of the Vegetarian Society UK, who offered her a job as assistant editor at their base in Altrincham. Her travels also piqued her interest in history and she began to study it seriously.

In 1974 at her Altrincham flat, her dressing gown ignited from an unguarded gas fire, inflicting third degree burns to her lower body, and second-degree burns to her back. She spent three months lying on her belly in the Burns Unit at Wythenshawe Hospital.

Leneman largely recovered by 1975 and did well enough in her A-levels to enroll that year, aged 31, as a student of history at the University of Edinburgh. She settled permanently in the city, and insofar as ethnicity is self-defined, this marks her transition to being Scottish.

She also won her first contract for a cookery book based on her recipes, Slimming the Vegetarian Way. Her next cookery book was Vegan Cooking: The Compassionate Way of Eating. She published nine vegan cookery books in her lifetime and a tenth was published posthumously. She saw her job as a cookery writer as being to make it easier for people to be vegan.

Her Ph.D. thesis became her first history book, Living in Atholl, based on the archives at Blair Atholl castle, which documented a society transitional between highland and lowland ways of life against the backdrop of the Jacobite rebellions. (The multilingual Leneman learned Gaelic in order to better read her sources.) This led to a productive collaboration with Rowy Mitchison in the Department of Economic and Social History at Edinburgh. 17th and 18th century Presbyterian churches pried into their parishioners' sex lives and called them to account, while Scots lawyers argued over which relationships were marriages "by habit and repute" (entailing property rights and legitimate children) and which were fornication. Girls in Trouble and Sin in the City brought these aspects of social history and women's history in Scotland to a wide audience.

In 1990 the National Museum of Scotland commissioned a series of mini-biographies, Scots Lives, and Leneman wrote the first, on Elsie Inglis. This expanded into In the Service of Life, a full-length account of Inglis' career during the Great War, raising a series of mobile battlefront hospitals staffed entirely by women, conducting advanced surgery and enduring multiple adventures and privations across wartime Europe. Many of those volunteers were from a suffrage background or were politicised by their experience, and in A Guid Cause, Leneman went on to document women's struggle for the vote in Scotland.

Leneman never held a tenured academic position, preferring to live from short-term grant to grant.

=== Personal life and death ===
From 1976 Leneman's partner was Graham Sutton (born 1950), a public health doctor, who shared her aversion to marriage and children. In 1991 she developed breast cancer but remained symptom-free until 1997, travelling, publishing and learning scuba-diving. She then became seriously ill, only to experience a two-year remission and resuming her life and work. Her health again declined in late 1999 and she died at home in Edinburgh.

Leneman wrote about her experiences with cancer and dying in "A personal history," published posthumously in Women's History Review

== Legacy ==
The Leah Leneman Essay Prize, established in 2002, is awarded every two years to writers in Scotland for an essay on women's or gender history.

== Publications ==
Food & cookery:

- Slimming the Vegetarian Way. Thorsons 1980 ISBN 0-7225-1587-1 republished as Slim the Vegetarian Way Thorsons 1993 ISBN 0-7225-2807-8
- Vegan Cooking: The Compassionate Way of Eating. Thorsons 1982 ISBN 0-7225-0753-4
- The Amazing Avocado. Thorsons 1984 ISBN 0-7225-0880-8
- The International Tofu Cookery Book. Routledge & Kegan Paul 1986 ISBN 0-7102-0702-6
- Vegetarian Pitta Bread Recipes. Thorsons 1987 ISBN 0-7225-1235-X
- Soya Foods Cookery. Routledge & Kegan Paul 1988 ISBN 0-7102-1028-0
- The Single Vegan. Thorsons 1989 ISBN 0-7225-1792-0 republished as Vegan Cooking for One Thorsons 2000 ISBN 0-7225-3923-1
- The Tofu Cookbook. Thorsons 1992 ISBN 0-7225-2587-7 ISBN 0-7225-3667-4
- 365 plus one Vegan Recipes. Thorsons 1993 ISBN 0-7225-2617-2 republished as Easy Vegan Cooking Thorsons 1998 ISBN 0-7225-3696-8
- Vegan Cooking for Everyone. Thorsons 2001 ISBN 0-00-712347-7

History:

- Living in Atholl: a social history of the estates, 1685–1785. Edinburgh University Press 1986 ISBN 0-85224-507-6
- Perspectives in Scottish History: essays in honour of Rosalind Mitchison (editor). Aberdeen University Press 1988 ISBN 0-08-036574-4
- Sexuality and Social Control, Scotland 1660–1780 with Rosalind Mitchison. Basil Blackwell 1989 ISBN 0-631-15028-5
- Fit for Heroes: Land settlement in Scotland after World War I. Aberdeen University Press 1989 ISBN 0-08-037720-3
- A Guid Cause: the Women's Suffrage Movement in Scotland. Aberdeen University Press 1991 ISBN 0-08-041201-7, Mercat Press 1995 ISBN 1873644-485
- Martyrs in Our Midst: Dundee, Perth and the Forcible Feeding of Suffragettes. Abertay Historical Society 1993 ISBN 0-900019-29-8
- In the Service of Life: the story of Elsie Inglis and the Scottish Women's Hospitals. Mercat Press 1994 ISBN 1873644264
- Leah Leneman (1997) The awakened instinct: vegetarianism and the women's suffrage movement in Britain, Women's History Review, 6:2, 271-287
- Girls in Trouble : sexuality and social control in rural Scotland, 1660–1780 with Rosalind Mitchison. Scottish Cultural Press 1998 ISBN 1-898218-89-7 ISBN 978-1-898218-89-0
- Sin in the City : sexuality and social control in urban Scotland, 1660–1780 with Rosalind Mitchison. Scottish Cultural Press 1998 ISBN 1-898218-90-0 ISBN 978-1-898218-90-6
- Alienated Affections: The Scottish Experience of Divorce and Separation, 1684–1830. Edinburgh University Press 1998 ISBN 0-7486-1031-6
- The Scottish Suffragettes (series editor Iseabail Macleod). NMS Publishing 2000 ISBN 1-901663-40-X
- Promises, Promises: Marriage Litigation in Scotland 1698-1830. NMS Enterprises 2003 ISBN 1-901663-52-3

Other:

- Consumer Feedback for the NHS: A Literature Review with Lyn Jones and Una Maclean. King Edward's Hospital Fund for London 1987 ISBN 1-870551-052
