= Humphrey Hume Wrong =

Canadian historian and diplomat (1894–1954)

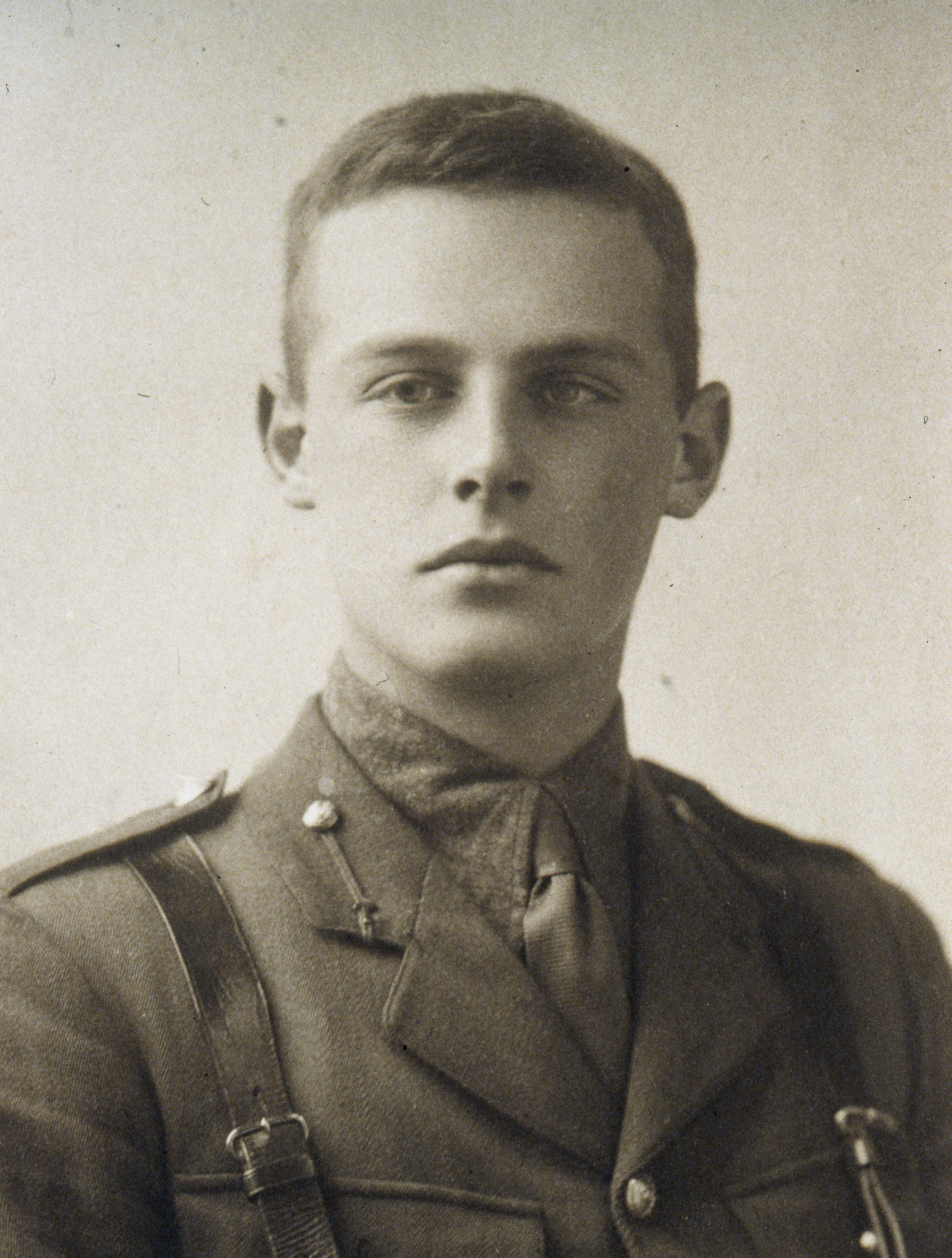
- Humphrey Hume Wrong c. 1915
- Born: September 10, 1894; Toronto, Ontario, Canada
- Died: January 24, 1954 (aged 59); Ottawa, Ontario, Canada
- Other name: Hume Wrong
- Education: University of Toronto
- Known for: Statesman
- Spouse: Mary Joyce Hutton
- Children: Dennis Wrong and June Rogers

Humphrey Hume Wrong (September 10, 1894 – January 24, 1954) was a Canadian historian, professor, career diplomat, and Canada's ambassador to the United States.

== Background and early life ==
Wrong was the grandson of Liberal Party leader Edward Blake and son of historian George MacKinnon Wrong. At age five he suffered the loss of an eye in an accident.

Hume Wrong graduated from high school at Ridley College and was a graduate of the University of Toronto where he joined The Kappa Alpha Society. During the First World War, Wrong served in the British Expeditionary Force where he was sent to the front before being invalided. After the war, he attended the University of Oxford for graduate study, and in 1921 became a history professor at the University of Toronto.

Hume was one of five siblings: educator, Margaret Christian Wrong (1887–1948); historian, Oxford academic, and Magdalen College Don, Edward Murray Wrong (1889–1928); British Army officer, Harold Verschoyle Wrong (born 1891, killed in action July 1, 1916, at the Battle of the Somme); and Agnes Honoria Wrong (1903–1995).

== Diplomatic appointments ==
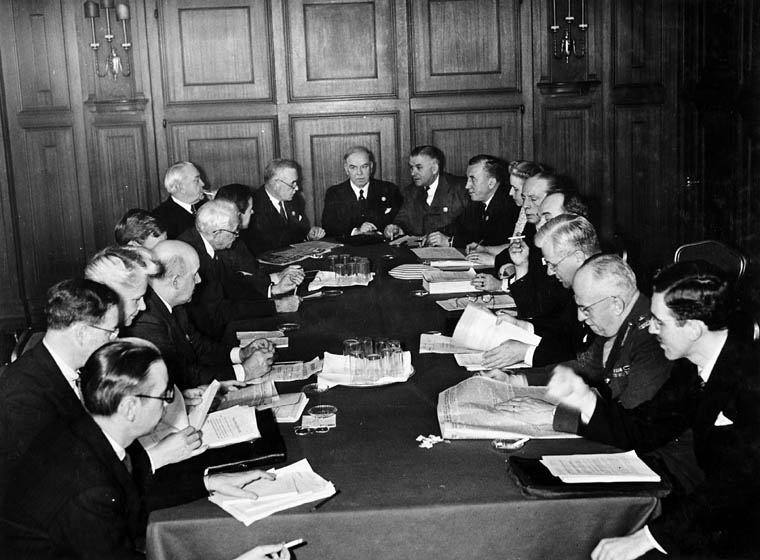
Hume Wrong and the Canadian Delegation to the United Nations, May 1945. Wrong is 5th from the right.

In April 1927 he became First Secretary to Vincent Massey, head of the Canadian Embassy in Washington, DC. Wrong joined the newly expanded Canadian Department of External Affairs around the same time as fellow future star diplomats Lester Pearson, Norman Robertson, and Hugh Keenleyside; this expansion was engineered by Oscar D. Skelton. Wrong served in the League of Nations and in 1938 he represented Canada at the Évian Conference.

In 1941 he went to Washington when Leighton McCarthy was made Ambassador, then 71 years old. That made Hume the de facto head of the delegation for Canada in Washington, performing such duties as implementation of the Ogdensburg Agreement.

He articulated the principle of functionalism in 1942 as follows:

The principle, I think, is that each member of the grand alliance should have a voice in the conduct of the war proportionate to its contribution to the general war effort. A subsidiary principle is that the influence of the various countries should be greatest in connection with those matters with which they are most directly concerned.

The placement of C. D. Howe on the Combined Production and Resources Board, and of other seats on the Combined Food Board, were evidence of the practice of functionalism. In the estimation of Jack Granatstein, "Canada’s massive war effort, coupled with its tough advocacy of the functionalism principle, made it one of the leaders of the middle powers for a few years during and after the war."

In 1946 Hume Wrong was appointed Canadian Ambassador to the United States and he remained in the post until 1953. He was one of the key architects of the North Atlantic Treaty, which would give rise to NATO. He later rose to become the Canadian Undersecretary of External Affairs and was named undersecretary to NATO, but died before he could take up the post.

== Death ==
Wrong is buried at Maclaren Cemetery in Wakefield, Quebec with his fellow diplomats and friends Norman Robertson and Lester B. Pearson. He is the father of renowned sociologist Dennis Wrong, and the grandfather of documentary filmmaker Terence Wrong.
