= Edward Murray Wrong =

E. M. Wrong
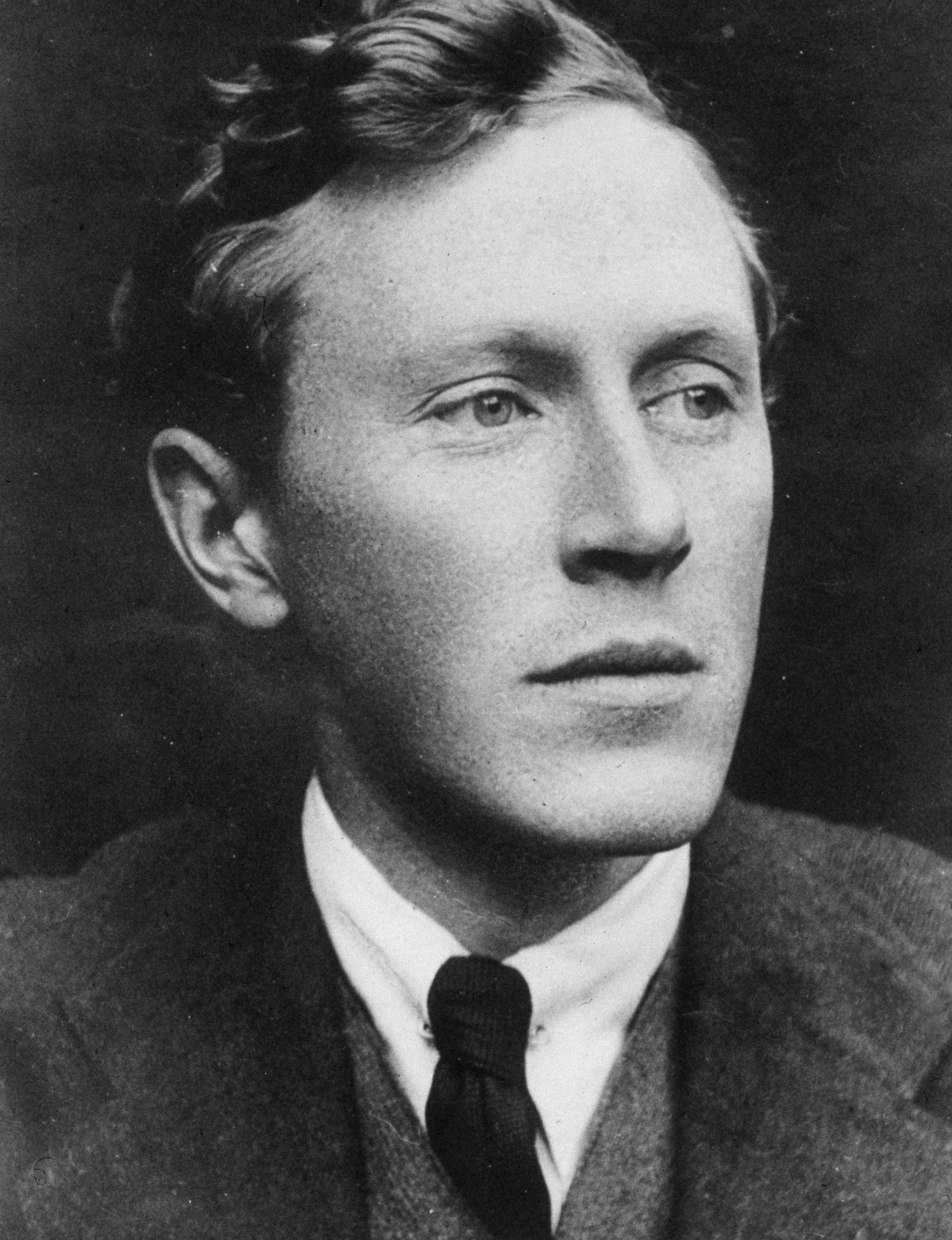
- Murray Wrong c.1910
- Born: 14 April 1889
- Died: 15 February 1928 (aged 38)

Academic background
- Education: University College, Toronto; Balliol College, Oxford

Academic work
- Discipline: Historian
- Sub-discipline: Modern history; history of England; history of Canada
- Institutions: Magdalen College, Oxford; Manchester School of Technology

Edward Murray Wrong (14 April 1889 – 15 February 1928) was a Canadian-born historian, vice-president of Magdalen College, Oxford (1924–25).

== Biography ==
Known as Murray, he was the son of Canadian historian George MacKinnon Wrong, and of Sophia Hume Wrong, daughter of the politician Edward Blake. He was the brother of diplomat Humphrey Hume Wrong. He was educated at St Andrew's College, Toronto. Like all his siblings and his father, Wrong studied at the University of Toronto. He then proceeded to Balliol College, Oxford as a commoner, where he was tutored by A. L. Smith, and obtained first-class honours in modern history in 1913.

In 1914, he was elected to a fellowship by examination at Magdalen College, Oxford, becoming the college's first Canadian fellow. In 1915, he was elected to the Beit Prize in Colonial History. Having been turned down for military service for health reasons, Wrong served as vice-principal of the Manchester School of Technology between 1916 and 1919. There, he was a successful administrator and teacher. He also served as a second lieutenant in the Territorial Force, attached to the School's Officer Training Corps, from 22 January 1918 to 20 September 1918; he relinquished his commission on account of ill health.

Following the end of the war, Wrong returned to Magdalen College, Oxford as an official fellow and tutor in modern history in 1919. He was additionally Beit lecturer in colonial history at the University of Oxford from 1919 to 1924. He served as vice-president of Magdalen College from 1924 to 1925, and as the university's junior proctor from 1927 to 1928.

Wrong died on 15 February 1928, aged 38. He had suffered heart failure brought on by pneumonia.

== Family ==
In December 1915, Wrong married Rosalind Grace Smith, sixth daughter of A. L. Smith (his old tutor and Master of Balliol College, Oxford), at Holywell Church, Oxford. They had two sons and four daughters. Among his children were the historian Rosalind Mitchison and medical scientist Oliver Wrong. His daughter Dr Elizabeth Catherine Wrong married the Labour politician Peter Shore.

The British journalist Michela Wrong is his granddaughter.
