= Gateway to Strangeness =

- Short story by Jack Vance
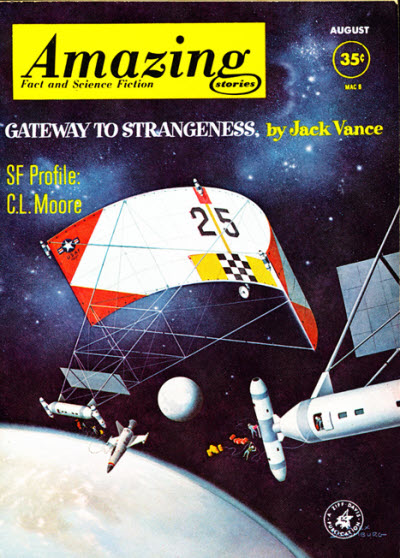
- Genre(s): Science fiction

Publication
- Published in: Amazing Stories
- Publication date: 1962

"Gateway to Strangeness", also titled "Dust of Far Suns" and "Sail 25", is a science fiction novelette by American writer Jack Vance. It was first published in the August 1962 issue of Amazing Stories magazine.

== Plot ==
Eight space trainees apprehensively await their new instructor, Henry Belt. Despite the many strange and outrageous stories they have heard about him, including his legendary drunkenness, one of them notes that all of the top men in space seem to have trained under him.

Since only six trainees can go on the space journey, Belt first assigns each man the task of building three specific devices using identical piles of assorted, mismatched parts. Only one manages to construct a working device. The two men who become the most frustrated by the nearly impossible tasks are dropped. The others board a small spaceship (Sail 25) propelled solely by a solar sail for a flight to Mars. Belt leaves the navigation entirely in their hands. All the while, he makes careful note of their faults (according to his idiosyncratic standards), recording their demerits in his little red book.

However, a mistake repairing a malfunctioning computing device causes them to miss their rendezvous, first with Mars, then with Jupiter. No other planet whose gravity could halt their outward flight (their solar sail can only propel them away from the Sun) is within reach. Belt dismantled their radio and the box of spare parts turns out to contain Belt's whiskey, so they cannot call for rescue. It seems that they are doomed. One man commits suicide, while two others become catatonic. Henry Belt insists that he is fated to die in space and offers no way out of their predicament.

The three remaining men eventually come up with a way to return safely to Earth. As they prepare to debark, spare parts for the computing device mysteriously appear.
