= Right precedence =

Right precedence in Judaism is a Minhag of Hasids to give precedence to the right side of things. A well-known exampled is putting on the right shoe before the left.

== Origin ==
The Talmud, in tractate Shabbat, quotes Johanan bar Nappaha who said one should wear the left shoe first. On the other hand, a Baraita says one should wear the right shoe first. Rav Yosef b. Hiyya said that since there is a source for every option, they are both fine. Rav Kahana II also didn't care which shoe is worn first. On the other hand, Rav Nachman bar Yitzchak said a Hasid should combine the options: enter the right shoe first, then the left and then tie the left shoe first and then the right. That was also the Minhag of Mar Bar Ravina.

The Minhag of Mar Bar Ravina was quoted in the prominent book of Halakha the Shulchan Aruch: "One should put his right shoe on first and the left shoe last. Only after putting on the left shoe should one begin tying the shoe laces. First tie the left shoe and then the right one."

Other activities with right precedence appear in a Baraita in the Talmud: "When one puts on his shoes, he must put on the right first and then the left; when he removes [them], he must remove the left [first] and then the right. When one washes, he must [first] wash the right [hand, foot] and then the left. When one anoints [himself] with oil, he must anoint the right and then the left."

The precedence of the right in hand washing and using lotion were brought to Halakha by Avraham Gombiner and in the book Mishnah Berurah by Israel Meir Kagan. Moses Isserles wrote he didn't see people do so.

Avraham Gombiner, based on Isaac Luria books, added: "One should put both sides of the cloth on his right hand and wear the right side and then the left and have Kavanah that everything included in the idea of right and from the right comes to the left." He was later quoted by Israel Meir Kagan and Yaakov Chaim Sofer, but while Kagan wrote it is a good thing to do, Sofer wrote it is a thing to be careful about.

There are other instances Judaism sources prefer the right side, and as the Talmud says: "All turns that you turn should be only to the right."

== In science ==
According to a study published in Journal of Experimental Psychology, "Right-handers tended to associate rightward space with positive ideas and leftward space with negative ideas, but left-handers showed the opposite pattern, associating rightward space with negative ideas and leftward with positive ideas."

== In popular media ==
In the Israeli TV series A Touch Away, Roha'le Berman tells Zorik Mintz that pedantry in the order of wearing shoes is a way to test the potential spouse in matchmaking.
