= Denis Mitchison =

British bacteriologist (1919–2018)

Denis Anthony "Denny" Mitchison
- Born: 6 September 1919; Oxford, England, UK
- Died: 2 July 2018 (aged 98); Kingston, London, England
- Education: Trinity College, Cambridge
- Occupation: bacteriologist
- Known for: treatment of drug-resistant tuberculosis, "short-course" regimens
- Medical career
- Institutions: Medical Research Council's Tuberculosis Research Unit
- Research: Tuberculosis treatment

Denis Anthony Mitchison CMG (6 September 1919 – 2 July 2018) was a British bacteriologist.

== Early life, family and education ==
Mitchison was born in Oxford in 1919, the son of the Labour politician Dick Mitchison and his wife, the writer Naomi (née Haldane). His uncle was the biologist J.B.S. Haldane and his grandfather the physiologist John Scott Haldane. His younger brothers are the zoologists Avrion Mitchison and the late Murdoch Mitchison.

He was educated at the Dragon School, Oxford, and Abbotsholme School, going on to Trinity College, Cambridge, where he studied natural science, obtaining a 1st class degree and a senior scholarship. He only then changed to medicine, qualifying from University College in 1943, and chose postgraduate training in pathology.

In September 1940, Denis married Ruth Gill at Carradale in Argyll, Scotland. Their daughter, Su, was born in 1942, and their son, Graeme, in 1945. In 1954 Naomi Mitchison wrote the fantasy book Graeme and the Dragon, in which the protagonist is her grandson, Graeme Mitchison.

== Career ==
His first job in pathology was at the Brompton Hospital at the time that the first clinical trial with a randomised intake between treatment of pulmonary tuberculosis (TB) with streptomycin or with bed rest alone was run.

Mitchison then continued his lifelong interest in the treatment of TB, participating in the clinical trials organised by the Medical Research Council's Tuberculosis Research Unit (MRC TRU) with Director Philip D'Arcy Hart.

Following the decisive importance of drug-resistant tubercle bacilli in treatment, he was appointed in 1964 as director of a new MRC Unit on Drug Resistance in Tuberculosis (later changed to MRC Unit for Laboratory Studies of Tuberculosis) at the Royal Postgraduate Medical School. He then worked closely with D'Arcy Hart at the MRC TRU and later with Wallace Fox, director of the MRC Tuberculosis and Chest Diseases Research Unit, on developing effective treatment for TB at a cost sufficiently low to be affordable in developing countries.

=== Research ===
The framework of this work was a series of clinical trials in the UK and in larger numbers in East Africa, India, Hong Kong, Singapore and Czechoslovakia. This work passed through two stages; the first dealt with the problem of drug-resistant tubercle bacilli, which was solved by the use of regimens incorporating 2, 3 or 4 different anti-tuberculosis drugs.

Starting with a publication in 1970, the second phase dealt with the shortening the treatment period from at least 12 months to 6 months by using rifampicin and pyrazinamide in so-called "short-course" regimens which have been the basis of current standard therapy with 2 months of 4 drugs (rifampicin, isoniazid, pyrazinamide and ethambutol) followed by 4 months of rifampicin and isoniazid.

He established specialist TB laboratories in Kenya, Uganda, Tanzania, Zambia and a central laboratory in Hong Kong.

=== Publications ===
He published about 250 papers dealing with (1) factors slowing the growth of tubercle bacilli that might account for the lengthy duration of treatment, including the first paper on the effects of anaerobic culture; (2) with Jean Dickinson on post-antibiotic effects to account for the success of intermittent drug dosage; (3) the curious characteristics of attenuated South Indian strains of TB; (4) the response to treatment when the strains were initially resistant to the drugs allowing identification of the action of individual drugs.

== Post-retirement ==
After his notional retirement in 1985, he continued working first at the Royal Postgraduate Medical School, Hammersmith and then at St George's, University of London. He developed the technique of measuring the early bactericidal activity of drugs, which is now standard practice as the initial step in the phase II of clinical development of new drugs with Amina Jindani and colleagues in South Africa. He also introduced the concept of the 8-week phase II study with the proportion of patients obtaining negative sputum culture at 8 weeks, a standard assessment in most such studies. More recently he developed a new type of phase II 8-week study using modelling of counts of TB in sputum during treatment (with Geraint Davies and the South African MRC). He worked on several new anti-TB drugs and participated in clinical trials on high dosage rifamycins.

Mitchison finally stopped regular work at the age of 95. He died in Kingston in July 2018 at the age of 98 of bilateral pulmonary embolism.
