= Dennis Wrong =

Canadian-born American sociologist and professor

Dennis Hume Wrong
- Born: November 22, 1923; Toronto, Ontario, Canada
- Died: November 8, 2018 (aged 94); Westford, Massachusetts, U.S.
- Education: University of Toronto; Columbia University
- Employer: New York University
- Known for: Sociologist
- Spouse(s): Elaine Gale Wrong (divorced); Jacqueline Conrath
- Children: 1 child; 2 stepchildren

Dennis Hume Wrong (November 22, 1923 – November 8, 2018) was a Canadian-born American sociologist and professor in the Department of Sociology at New York University.

Wrong was the author of several books, including two essay collections containing articles first published in cultural, intellectual, political and scholarly journals in the United States, Canada, and Britain.

== Life ==
Dennis was the son of Humphrey Hume Wrong and Mary Joyce (Hutton) Wrong. He first studied in Toronto, then in Washington and Geneva where his father was a diplomat. He harvested wheat during WWII (a foot condition having kept him out of active military service) and earned a bachelor's degree from University of Toronto in 1945. During graduate study at Columbia University he was influenced by C. Wright Mills and Robert K. Merton, gaining the Ph.D. in 1956. He lived in Greenwich Village, NYC, socializing with novelists and other intellectuals and publishing in various journals.

Wrong was best known for a 1961 article in the American Sociological Review called "The Oversocialized Conception of Man in Modern Sociology." His 1994 book The Problem of Order (see section on Work below) was an enlargement on the 1961 article. In 1999, he reissued his 1976 essay collection Skeptical Sociology under the title The Oversocialized Conception of Man.

He taught sociology at Princeton University, Rutgers, Brown University, the University of Toronto, the New School for Social Research Graduate Faculty, and for most of his career at New York University. Wrong was a permanent editor at Dissent magazine.

The Dennis Wrong Award is given for the best graduate paper of the year by New York University's sociology department.

== Work ==
Wrong's 1961 article, "The Oversocialized Conception of Man in Modern Sociology," criticized the limitations of structural functionalism employed by Talcott Parsons. Parsons, in Wrong's view, had eliminated "the resistance...to the demands of society offered by the Freudian id and even by the rational calculating ego."

In 1968 Wrong began to write on power (social and political) with a contribution to American Journal of Sociology. The article argued that power is not asymmetrical except in cases of physical violence. It distinguished power from control and potential from possible powers. He cited Bertrand Russell (1938) Power: a new social analysis and Nelson W. Polsby (1963) Community Power and Social Theory.

In 1979, he published Power: its forms, bases, and uses which was widely reviewed. For example, Jennie M. Hornosty criticized the book for its lack of discussion of class conflict, digression into peripheral issues, and weakness on the social-structural variants of power.

Michael Mann criticized it for incompleteness, though he praised the first 159 pages. In Mann's view Wrong's view descends into an analysis of aggregates of individuals at the end. He expected more description of the complex and interpenetrating relations between classes, states, churches, communities, and bureaucracies.

Wrong described his 1994 book The Problem of Order as "a sequel to, or enlargement upon" his 1961 article. The book considers a number of theorists and writers, including Hobbes, Rousseau, Freud, and Parsons. In his discussion of Freud and in particular Freud's Civilization and Its Discontents, Wrong observes that one may "accept the substance of Freud's emphasis on conflict and ambivalence" while rejecting some of Freud's formulations in Civilization about "nature" versus "culture". Nature and culture are both "riven with conflicts that cut across one another, so the simple dichotomy of nature versus culture so often represented as the essence of Freud's social theory is not tenable."

== Quotes ==
In his book Power... Wrong argued:

It has been argued that, like "freedom" or "justice" – those "big words which make us so unhappy", as Stephen Dedalus called them – "power" is an "essentially contested concept", meaning that people with different values and beliefs are bound to disagree over its nature and definition. It is claimed therefore that there cannot be any commonly accepted or even preferred meaning so long as people differ on normative issues as they are likely to do indefinitely, if not forever. "Power", however, does not seem to me to be an inherently normative concept. [...] its scope and pervasiveness, its involvement in any and all spheres of social life, give it almost unavoidable evaluative overtones. Positive or negative, benign or malign, auras come to envelop it, linking it still more closely to ideological controversy. Yet power as a generic attribute of social life is surely more like the concepts of "society", "group" or "social norm" than like such essentially and inescapably normative notions as "justice", "democracy" or "human rights". (Wrong 2002: viii)

== Family ==
He was the father of documentary filmmaker Terence Wrong, the grandson of George Mackinnon Wrong, Canadian historian, and son of Humphrey Hume Wrong, Canadian Ambassador to the United States.

== Bibliography ==
- 1970: (editor) Makers of Modern Social Science: Max Weber, Prentice Hall ISBN 9780139478468
- 1972: (with Harry L. Gracey) Readings in Introductory Sociology, Macmillan Publishers
- 1976: Skeptical Sociology, Columbia University Press ISBN 0231040148
- 1995 [1980]: Power: Its Forms, Bases and Uses, Transaction Publishers
- 1994: The Problem of Order: What Unites and Divides Society, Free Press/Macmillan ISBN 9780029355152
- 1998: The Modern Condition: Essays at Century’s End, Stanford University Press
- 1999: The Oversocialized Conception of Man, Transaction Publishers
- 2003: Reflections on a Politically Skeptical Era, Transaction Publishers ISBN 0765801957
- 2005: The Persistence of the Particular ISBN 0765802724

=== Articles ===
- 1961: "The Oversocialized Conception of Man in Modern Sociology", American Sociological Review 26(2): 183–193)

== See also ==
- Zero-sum game - a concept discussed in "Power..."
