= Avrion Mitchison =

British zoologist and immunologist (1928–2022)

- Born: Nicholas Avrion Mitchison; 5 May 1928; Hammersmith, London, England
- Died: 28 December 2022 (aged 94); Wardington, Oxfordshire, England
- Education: University of Oxford
- Spouse: Lorna Margaret Martin
- Children: 5, including Tim Mitchison
- Parents: Naomi Haldane; Dick Mitchison, Baron Mitchison
- Relatives: Denis Mitchison (brother); Murdoch Mitchison (brother); John Scott Haldane (grandfather); J. B. S. Haldane (uncle)
- Awards: Fellow of the Royal Society (1967); Novartis Prize for Basic Immunology (1995)
- Scientific career
- Workplaces: University College London
- Doctoral advisor: Peter Medawar

Nicholas Avrion Mitchison FRS (5 May 1928 – 28 December 2022) was a British zoologist and immunologist.

== Life and career ==
Mitchison was born in Hammersmith, London on 5 May 1928, the son of the Labour politician Dick Mitchison (Baron Mitchison of Carradale in the County of Argyll, who died 1970) and his wife, the writer Naomi (née Haldane). His uncle was the biologist J.B.S. Haldane and his grandfather the physiologist John Scott Haldane. His elder brothers are the bacteriologist Denis Mitchison and the zoologist Murdoch Mitchison.

He was educated at Leighton Park School and secured a Classics scholarship to Balliol College. He received his DPhil at New College, Oxford with Nobelist Sir Peter Medawar. This was followed by a long career as Professor of Zoology at University College London, where his uncle J.B.S. Haldane taught, at the National Institute of Medical Research at Mill Hill and as founding Director of the German Rheumatism Research Center Berlin (DRFZ) in Germany. He was a Professor Emeritus at University College London.

Mitchison's contributions to immunology include the discovery of both low dose and high dose tolerance for a single antigen, a surprising result in the context of basic clonal selection theory, but which can be understood in the context of immune network theory. He was also a founder member of the British Society for Immunology alongside John H. Humphrey, Bob White, and Robin Coombs.

He was married to Lorna Margaret Martin, daughter of Maj-Gen John Simson Stuart Martin, CSI. They have five children, Tim, Matthew, Mary, Hannah and Ellen. Two are cell biologists Tim Mitchison and Hannah M. Mitchison.

Mitchison later suffered from dementia. He died at a care home in Wardington, Oxfordshire, on 28 December 2022, aged 94.

== Research ==
Mitchison discovered the transference of transplantation immunity by sensitised cells, thereby providing evidence relating transplantation immunity to hypersensitivity reactions of the 'delayed' type. He devised a method for revealing mixtures of cells of different genotypes in vivo and used it to be equal first in demonstrating that the 'radiation recovery factor' is a graft of living cells and not a humoral agent. He carried out the most exact quantitative analysis of tolerance hitherto attempted in a cellular system and proved that persistence of tolerance depends on persistence of antigen.

== Awards and honours ==
Mitchison was elected a Fellow of the Royal Society (FRS) in 1967. He was also a foreign member of the National Academy of Sciences, USA. He held an Honorary Doctorate from the Weizmann Institute and in 1995 was awarded the Novartis Prize for Basic Immunology.

== Avrion Mitchison Prize for Rheumatology ==
In honor of its Founding Director, the Deutsches Rheuma-Forschungszentrum Berlin (DRFZ), a Leibniz Institute, annually awards the Avrion Mitchison Prize to young scientists contributing significantly to understanding and treating rheumatic diseases. Donated by the Ernst Schering Foundation until 2018, the prize is now awarded by the DRFZ. The prize money is 3,000 Euros.
