= Memoirs of a Spacewoman =

1962 novel by Naomi Mitchison

- Cover of the first edition
- Author: Naomi Mitchison
- Language: English
- Genre: Science fiction
- Publisher: Victor Gollancz Ltd
- Publication date: 1962
- Publication place: Great Britain
- Media type: Print (hardcover and paperback)
- Pages: 176 pp

Memoirs of a Spacewoman is a science fiction novel by Scottish novelist and poet Naomi Mitchison published in 1962 by Victor Gollancz Ltd.

== Plot summary ==
The novel presents as the memoir of Mary, a communication specialist who travels through space and time as part of an exploration team. It delves into themes such as communication with alien beings and the complexities of interstellar travel, along with concepts of sexuality, reproduction, parenthood and child-rearing, diverse perceptions of time, and the psychological impacts of space exploration.

In this narrative, Mary, the protagonist, is a scientist and explorer at a time when humans have reached many worlds across various galaxies. Her society is one in which leadership is not defined by gender and one which does not engage in the norms of sexuality and motherhood of contemporary 1960s human society. The overarching mission of her team is the pursuit of knowledge and providing assistance to beings they encounter, adhering to strict guidelines against certain forms of interference. Mary's expertise lies in telepathic communication with non-human forms of life.

== Major themes ==
The novel features a number of different, expansive worlds with different forms of life, which allows for discussion of various ethical issues, such as the ethical treatment of non-human animals, forward-thinking approaches to social and ethical issues, and sexual liberation, and it presents situations such as non-human animals being treated as “intellectual equals, or, in certain subjects, superiors”. The sympathetic and empathetic views expressed in the novel on the treatment non-human animals may stem from Mitchison’s views on the rights of non-human animals and the treatment of colonised people of the time. During her life, Mitchinson had seen the birth of the independence of a number of different colonies, including India (1947) and South Africa (1961) which both featured very popular independence movements.

== Publication history ==
- 1962, Great Britain, Victor Gollancz Ltd, hardcover
- January 1964, Great Britain, Four Square Books, paperback
- June 1973, United States, Berkley Medallion, ISBN 0-425-02345-1, paperback
- 1976, Great Britain, New English Library, ISBN 0-450-02977-8, hardcover
- April 1977, Great Britain, New English Library Master SF series, ISBN 0-450-03000-8, paperback, with introduction by Hilary Rubinstein
- July 1985, Great Britain, The Women's Press, ISBN 0-7043-3970-6, paperback
- February 2011, Great Britain, Kennedy & Boyd, ISBN 978-1-84921-035-5, paperback
