= George MacKinnon Wrong =

Canadian clergyman and historian (1860–1948)

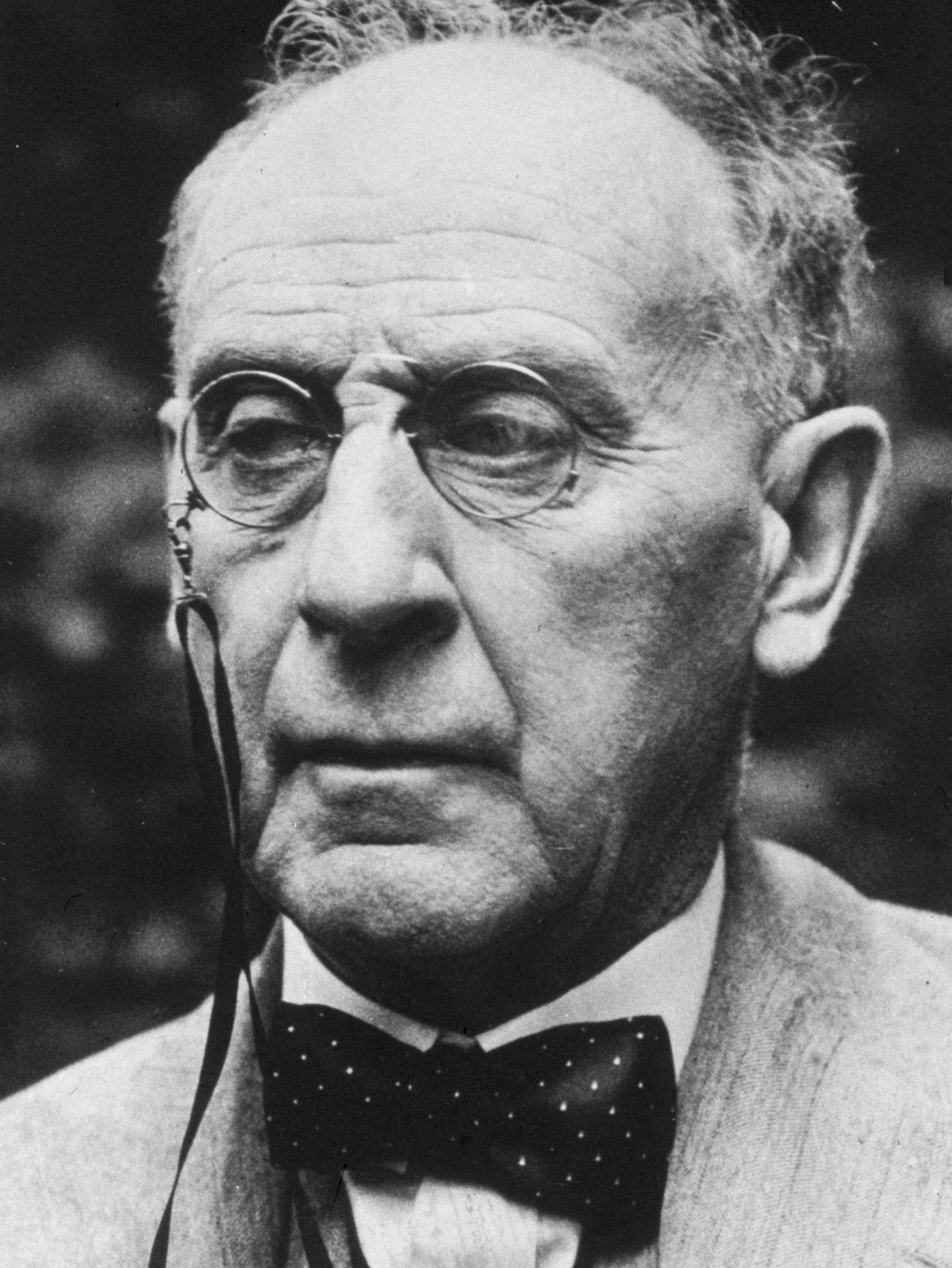
- Born: June 25, 1860; Grovesend, Elgin County, Canada West
- Died: June 29, 1948 (aged 88); Toronto, Ontario, Canada
- Other names: George McKinnon Wrong
- Employer: University of Toronto
- Known for: Historian
- Spouse(s): Sophia Hume Blake, the daughter of Edward Blake
- Children: Margaret Christian Wrong, Edward Murray Wrong, Harold Verschoyle Wrong, Humphrey Hume Wrong, and Agnes Honoria Wrong

George MacKinnon Wrong FRSC (June 25, 1860 – June 29, 1948) was a Canadian clergyman and historian.

== Life and career ==
Born at Grovesend in Elgin County, Canada West (now Ontario), he was ordained in the Anglican priesthood in 1883 after attending Wycliffe College. In 1894, as successor to Sir Daniel Wilson, he was appointed professor and head of the Department of History at the University of Toronto from which he retired in 1927. He was elected a fellow of the Royal Society of Canada in 1908 and received an honorary LLD from McGill University in 1919 and the University of Toronto in 1941. Wrong died in Toronto, Ontario on June 29, 1948.

A believer in the historian's moral duty to interpret the past for society's present needs, Wrong viewed Canadian history in terms of the country's British and French origins and the American presence. As a teacher, administrator, writer, and a moving force in the early days of the Canadian Historical Association, he helped to provide an intellectual base for a developing Canadian nationality. In 1896-97 he founded the Review of Historical Publications Relating to Canada (since 1920 the Canadian Historical Review) and in 1905 he co-founded the Champlain Society. He wrote numerous monographs and texts on Canadian history, the best being A Canadian Manor and Its Seigneurs (1908). Formal in habit and something of an anglophile in taste, Wrong influenced a generation of students. He received the Royal Society of Canada's J. B. Tyrrell Historical Medal in 1929.

Wrong's eldest son Murray was a long-time friend of Vincent Massey. He "assumed his ecclesiastical robes" in 1915 to assist in Massey's marriage to Alice Parkin. Wrong owned a property near Canton, Ontario. Massey bought the adjacent property in 1918 and converted it into his principal residence, Batterwood House, in 1927.

== Personal life ==
In 1886, Wrong married Sophia Hume Blake, the daughter of Edward Blake, Premier of Ontario (1871 to 1872) and leader of the Liberal Party of Canada (1880 to 1887). They had five children:

- Margaret Christian Wrong (1887–1948); educator
- Edward Murray Wrong (1889–1928); historian and Oxford academic
- Harold Verschoyle Wrong (1891–1916); British Army officer, killed in action in the Battle of the Somme during World War I
- Humphrey Hume Wrong (1894–1954); diplomat
- Agnes Honoria Wrong (1903-1995)

The historian Rosalind Mitchison and the physician Oliver Wrong were both grandchildren by Edward Murray Wrong. The sociologist Dennis Wrong was his grandson by Humphrey Hume Wrong.

All of the Wrong children and their father were graduates of the University of Toronto.

== Selected works ==
- The Conquest of New France (1910)
- The Fall of Canada (1914)
- The United States and Canada: A Political Study (1921)
- The Rise and Fall of New France (1928)
- Britain's History (1929)
- Canada and the American Revolution: The Disruption of the First British Empire (1935)
