= Dick Mitchison, Baron Mitchison =

British politician (1894–1970)

The Right Honourable The Lord Mitchison CBE QC

Member of Parliament for Kettering
- In office 5 July 1945 – 15 October 1964
- Preceded by: John Profumo
- Succeeded by: Geoffrey de Freitas

Personal details
- Born: Gilbert Richard Mitchison; 23 March 1894 Staines, Middlesex, England
- Died: 14 February 1970 (aged 75) Westminster, London, England
- Party: Labour
- Spouse: Naomi Haldane (m. 1916)
- Children: Geoffrey, Denis, Murdoch, Avrion, Lois, and Valentine
- Education: Eton College; New College, Oxford
- Nickname: Dick

Gilbert Richard Mitchison, Baron Mitchison, CBE, QC (23 March 1894 – 14 February 1970), known as Dick Mitchison, was a British Labour politician.

== Life ==
Born in Staines, Mitchison was educated at Eton College and New College, Oxford, and became a barrister (called to the bar in 1917) and King's Counsel. He served with the Queen's Bays in the First World War, attaining the rank of Major and gaining the Croix de Guerre.

Mitchison stood for Parliament as a Labour Party candidate without success in King's Norton at the 1931 and 1935 elections. He worked in the Ministry of Labour during the Second World War, on William Beveridge's Manpower Survey, and led the Nuffield College social reconstruction survey. He was the successful candidate for Kettering at the 1945 election – beating the young Conservative incumbent, John Profumo – and remained the constituency's Member of Parliament until 1964. His association with Labour's left wing proved a barrier to ministerial office. Mitchison sponsored the New Streets Act as a private member's bill. He was given a life peerage, created Baron Mitchison, of Carradale in the County of Argyllshire on 5 October 1964. He served on the executive of the Fabian Society.

Mitchison died in Westminster aged 75.

== Family ==
Mitchison married the writer Naomi Haldane (daughter of John Scott Haldane and sister of J. B. S. Haldane) in Oxford in 1916. They had six children, including four sons: Geoffrey (1918–1927), Denis (1919–2018, a professor of bacteriology), Murdoch (1922–2011) and Avrion (1928–2022), both professors of zoology. Their daughters were Lois and Valentine, the latter of whom married the historian Mark Arnold-Forster.

Parliament of the United Kingdom
Preceded by John Profumo	Member of Parliament for Kettering; 1945–1964	Succeeded by Geoffrey de Freitas
