= Michela Wrong =

British journalist and author (born 1961)

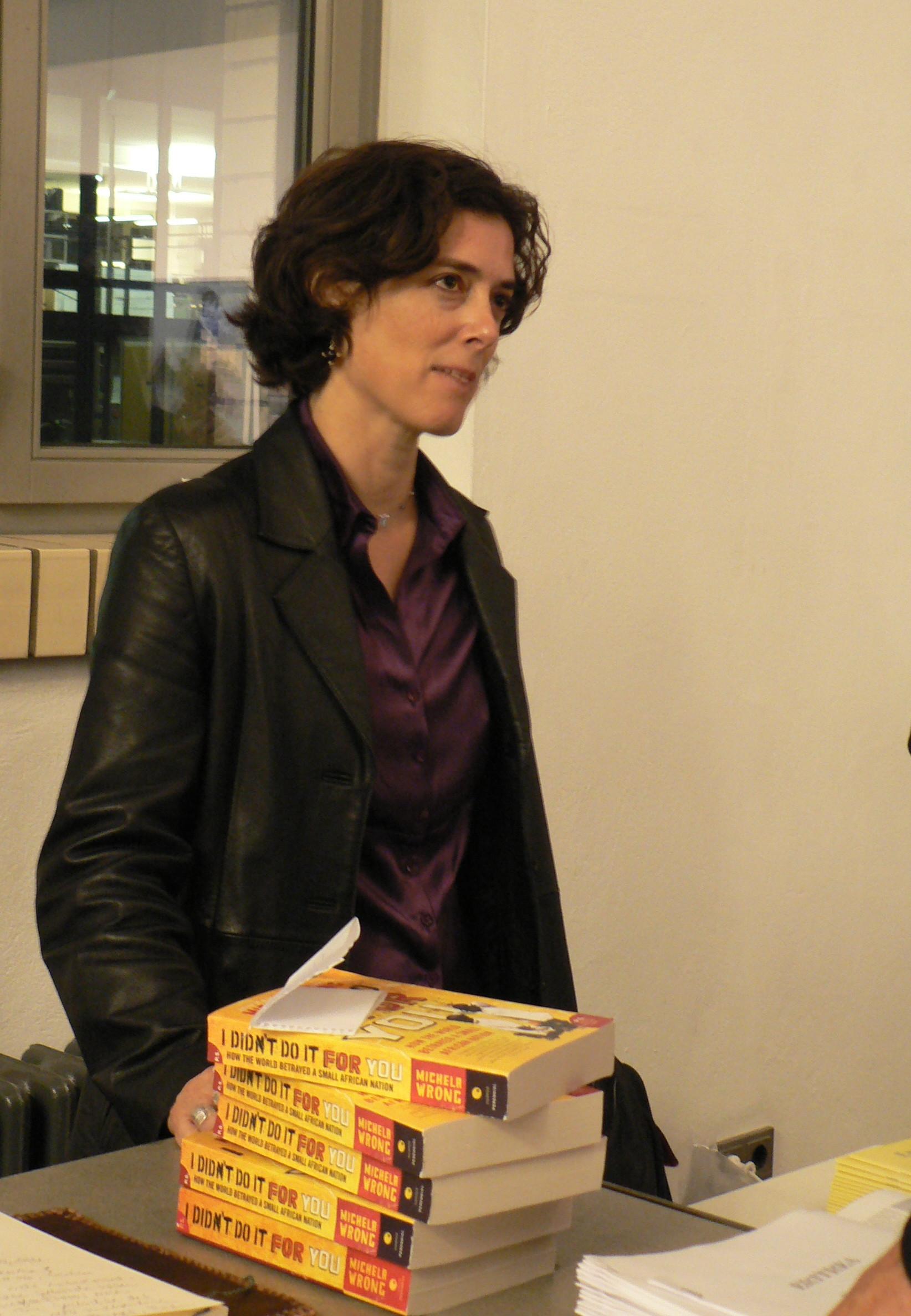
- Wrong in 2006
- Born: 1961 (age 64–65); Britain
- Other name: Michela
- Occupations: Journalist, author, freelance writer
- Years active: 20 years
- Known for: writing about Africa for more than 20 years
- Father: Oliver Wrong
- Awards: James Cameron prize for journalism (2010)

Michela Wrong (born 1961) is a British journalist and author. She has written about Africa for over 20 years. She began her career covering European affairs before focusing on Africa, reporting on its Western, Central, and Eastern regions. Wrong worked for Reuters, the BBC, and Financial Times before becoming a freelance writer.

== Career ==
Her first book, In the Footsteps of Mr. Kurtz (2001), documents her experiences in Zaire (now the Democratic Republic of the Congo) during its transition from Mobutu Sese Seko to Laurent-Désiré Kabila. Her second book, I Didn't Do It For You: How the World Betrayed a Small African Nation (2004), explores the 20th-century history of Eritrea and the role of foreign powers in shaping its fate.

Her third book, It's Our Turn to Eat: The Story of a Kenyan Whistle-Blower (2009), tells the story of John Githongo, a Kenyan journalist and civil society activist who, in 2002, took on a senior anti-corruption role within the government of President Mwai Kibaki. In this role, Githongo uncovered evidence of corruption (notably the Anglo-Leasing scandal) within the Kibaki government. The book also discusses the role of ethnicity in Kenyan politics and is critical of the response of the international aid community to Githongo's case. The World Bank and the British government's aid department (the Department for International Development) faced criticism, with exceptions such as Edward Clay, the then British High Commissioner to Kenya, noted. It's Our Turn to Eat was censored in Kenya, leading to PEN Kenya president and activist Philo Ikonya acquiring books and bringing them into the country for distribution.

In 2009, Wrong published the novel Borderlines. The story concerns a border conflict between two imaginary states in the Horn of Africa that, according to a Financial Times reviewer, bears similarities to the Ethiopia-Eritrea conflicts from 1998 to 2000.

In 2021, she published Do Not Disturb: The Story of a Political Murder and an African Regime Gone Bad, about Rwanda, its president Paul Kagame, and the murder of Patrick Karegeya. A review of the book in The Washington Post called the book "devastating", while The Guardian called it "uncomfortable reading". Rwandan journalist Vincent Gasana criticized the book as an attempt to "cast the RPF as the villain of any piece, while attempting to delegitimize the Rwandan government".

== Award ==
She was awarded the 2010 James Cameron Prize for journalism “that combines moral vision and professional integrity”.

== Personal life ==
Wrong lives in London. She has published opinion pieces and book reviews in The Observer, The Guardian, The Financial Times, The New York Times, New Statesman, The Spectator, Standpoint, and Foreign Policy, as well as travel pieces for Condé Nast's Traveler magazine. She speaks fluent Italian and French.

She is a former literary director of the Miles Morland Foundation, an organization which supports writers and their projects, focusing on Africa and other global regions.

Wrong is the granddaughter of Oxford historian Edward Murray Wrong and daughter of the nephrologist Oliver Wrong.

== Works ==
- Wrong, Michela (2001). In the Footsteps of Mr. Kurtz: Living on the Brink of Disaster in the Congo. HarperCollins. pp. 352. ISBN 978-0-06-018880-1.
- Wrong, Michela (2005). I Didn't Do It for You: How the World Betrayed a Small African Nation. HarperCollins. pp. 448. ISBN 978-0-06-078092-0.
- Wrong, Michela (2009). It's Our Turn to Eat: The Story of a Kenyan Whistle-Blower. Harper. p. 368. ISBN 978-0-06-134658-3.
- Wrong, Michela (2015). Borderlines. Fourth Estate. p. 352. ISBN 978-0-00-814740-2.
- Michela Wrong (2021). Do Not Disturb: The Story of a Political Murder and an African Regime Gone Bad. ISBN 978-1610398428.
