= Bethnal Green East (2014 ward) =

Bethnal Green East Bethnal Green (2014–2022)
- Electoral ward for the Tower Hamlets London Borough Council
- The ward boundaries since 2014
- Borough: Tower Hamlets
- County: Greater London
- Population: 21,090 (2021)
- Electorate: 13,778 (2022)
- Major settlements: Bethnal Green
- Area: 1.186 square kilometres (0.458 sq mi)

Current electoral ward
- Created: 2014
- Number of members: 3
- Councillors: Syed Abdullah; Ahmodul Kabir; Halima Islam
- Created from: Bethnal Green North, Bethnal Green South, Mile End and Globe Town
- GSS code: E05009317

Bethnal Green East is an electoral ward in the London Borough of Tower Hamlets. The ward was created as Bethnal Green in 2014 and was renamed in 2022. It was first used in the 2014 elections. It returns three councillors to Tower Hamlets London Borough Council.

== Councillors ==
| Election | Councillors | | |
|---|---|---|---|
| 2014 | Sirajul Islam (Labour Party) | Amy Gibbs (Labour Party) | Shafiqul Haque (Tower Hamlets First) |
| 2018 | Sirajul Islam (Labour Party) | Mohammed Hossain (Labour Party) | Eve McQuillan (Labour Party) |
| 2022 | Sirajul Islam (Labour Party) | Ahmodul Kabir (Aspire) | Rebeka Sultana (Labour Party) |
| 2026 | Syed Abdullah (Aspire) | Ahmodul Kabir (Aspire) | Halima Islam (Aspire) |

== Tower Hamlets council elections ==
The Bethnal Green ward was renamed Bethnal Green East in 2022 with no changes to the boundaries.

=== 2022 election ===
The election took place on 5 May 2022.

2022 Tower Hamlets London Borough Council election: Bethnal Green East
| Party | Candidate | Votes | % | ±% |
|---|---|---|---|---|
| Labour | Sirajul Islam | 2,395 | 40.55 | −9.50 |
| Labour | Rebeka Sultana | 2,166 | 36.67 | −14.90 |
| Aspire | Ahmodul Kabir | 2,153 | 36.45 | +27.59 |
| Aspire | Syed Abdullah | 2,112 | 35.76 | +28.79 |
| Labour | Eve McQuillan | 2,076 | 35.15 | −14.66 |
| Aspire | Nurul Gaffar | 2,001 | 33.88 | +27.57 |
| Green | Rupert George | 720 | 12.19 | +0.20 |
| Green | Jack Mathews | 609 | 10.31 | +0.23 |
| Green | Daniel Smith | 585 | 9.91 | +0.50 |
| Liberal Democrats | Ryan James | 313 | 5.30 | −1.33 |
| Conservative | Benjamin Hack | 289 | 4.89 | −0.26 |
| Conservative | Samuel Hall | 273 | 4.62 | −0.53 |
| Conservative | Dinah George | 271 | 4.59 | −0.56 |
| Liberal Democrats | Eugene Lynch | 233 | 3.95 | −2.19 |
| Liberal Democrats | Callum Robertson | 232 | 3.93 | −1.78 |
| Rejected ballots | | 47 | | |
| Turnout | | 5,906 | 42.87 | +0.96 |
| Registered electors | | 13,778 | | |
| Labour hold | | Swing | | |
| Labour hold | | Swing | | |
| Aspire gain from Labour | | Swing | | |

=== 2018 election ===
The election took place on 3 May 2018.

2018 Tower Hamlets London Borough Council election: Bethnal Green
| Party | Candidate | Votes | % | ±% |
|---|---|---|---|---|
| Labour | Mohammed Hossain | 2,916 | 51.57 | +7.75 |
| Labour | Sirajul Islam | 2,830 | 50.05 | +15.55 |
| Labour | Eve McQuillan | 2,816 | 49.81 | +19.13 |
| PATH | Syed Haque | 800 | 14.15 | N/A |
| PATH | Shamsul Hoque | 778 | 13.76 | N/A |
| Green | Eleanor Matthews | 678 | 11.99 | −8.51 |
| Green | Paul Burgess | 570 | 10.08 | N/A |
| Women's Equality | Jessie MacNeil-Brown | 564 | 9.98 | N/A |
| Green | John Foster | 532 | 9.41 | N/A |
| Aspire | Farhana Akther | 501 | 8.86 | N/A |
| Aspire | Md Amadul Chowdhury | 394 | 6.97 | N/A |
| Liberal Democrats | Will Dyer | 375 | 6.63 | −2.84 |
| Aspire | Jamir Hussain | 357 | 6.31 | N/A |
| Liberal Democrats | Silas Davis | 347 | 6.14 | N/A |
| Liberal Democrats | Phyllisa Shelton | 323 | 5.71 | N/A |
| Conservative | Radia Alam | 291 | 5.15 | −1.77 |
| Conservative | Lillian Ingram | 291 | 5.15 | +0.18 |
| Conservative | Dinah Glover | 291 | 5.15 | +1.57 |
| Rejected ballots | | 82 | | |
| Turnout | | 5,736 | 41.91 | |
| Registered electors | | 13,688 | | |
| Labour hold | | Swing | | |
| Labour hold | | Swing | | |
| Labour gain from Tower Hamlets First | | Swing | | |

=== 2014 election ===
The election took place on 22 May 2014.

2014 Tower Hamlets London Borough Council election: Bethnal Green
| Party | Candidate | Votes | % | ±% |
|---|---|---|---|---|
| Labour | Amy Gibbs | 2,911 | 43.82 | |
| Labour | Sirajul Islam | 2,292 | 34.50 | |
| Tower Hamlets First | Shafiqul Haque | 2,048 | 30.83 | |
| Labour | Abdirashid Gulaid | 2,038 | 30.68 | |
| Tower Hamlets First | Babu Chowdhury | 1,792 | 26.98 | |
| Tower Hamlets First | Salim Ullah | 1,652 | 24.87 | |
| Green | Chris Thorne | 1,362 | 20.50 | |
| Liberal Democrats | Kamrun Shajahan | 629 | 9.47 | |
| UKIP | Lubov Zsikhotska | 622 | 9.36 | |
| Conservative | Alan Mak | 460 | 6.92 | |
| Conservative | Meera Amrish Patel | 330 | 4.97 | |
| TUSC | Ellen Kenyon Peers | 327 | 4.92 | |
| TUSC | Clive Heemskerk | 254 | 3.82 | |
| Conservative | Taz Kha'lique | 238 | 3.58 | |
| Turnout | | 6,708 | 47.63 | |
| Labour win (new seat) | | | | |
| Labour win (new seat) | | | | |
| Tower Hamlets First win (new seat) | | | | |
