= Oliver Wrong =

Academic nephrologist

Professor Oliver Murray Wrong (7 February 1925 – 24 February 2012) was an eminent academic nephrologist (kidney specialist) and one of the founders of the speciality in the United Kingdom. From a background as a "salt and water" physician, he made detailed clinical observations and scientifically imaginative connections which were the basis of numerous advances in the molecular biology of the human kidney. Wrong himself contributed to much of the molecular work after his own "retirement". He dictated amendments to his final paper during his final illness in his own teaching hospital, University College Hospital (UCH), London. Though academic in his leanings, he was a compassionate physician who established a warm rapport with patients (though not with his students), a link he regarded as the keystone of his research. He belonged to a generation of idealistic young doctors responsible for the establishment of the UK's National Health Service in the post-War years.

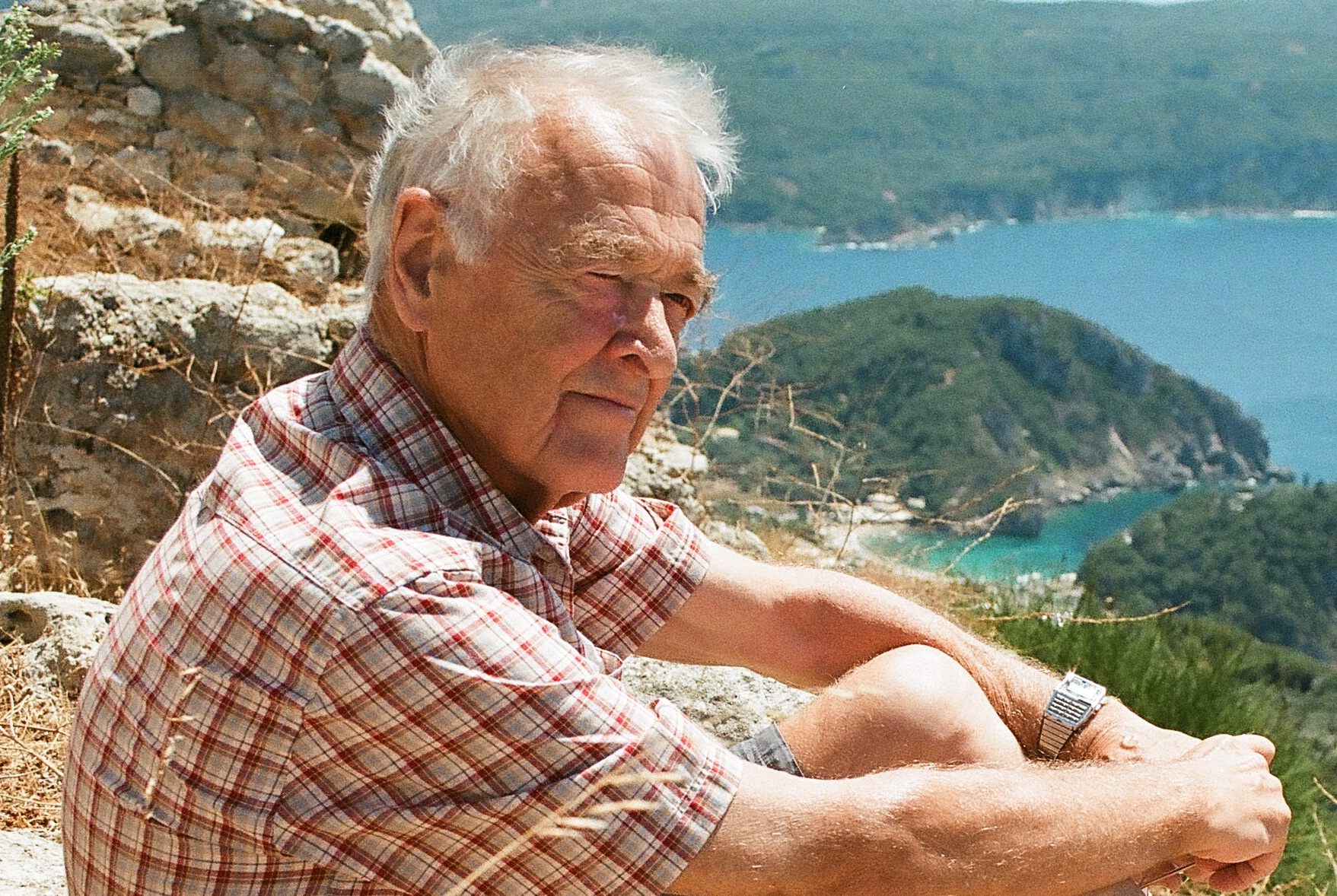
Oliver Wrong on holiday

== Background ==
Wrong was born in Magdalen College, Oxford, and was one of six children of Edward Murray Wrong and Rosalind Smith. Murray Wrong was a history lecturer and later vice-president of Magdalen, and his own father was the historian George MacKinnon Wrong, head of the department of history at University of Toronto. Rosalind, herself a historian, was the daughter of the Master of Balliol, A.L. Smith. Murray died of heart disease at the age of 38 and Oliver wrote an account of his father's illness, including consultations with Sir William Osler, in a vignette "Osler and my father". His father's early death and the Great Depression led to a split in the upbringing of the six children. Oliver was sent to Toronto with two of his sisters and was raised by his grandfather, George MacKinnon Wrong. Another sister was Rosalind Mitchison.

== Education ==
Oliver Wrong studied medicine at Magdalen and completed his clinical studies at the Radcliffe Hospital, Oxford. His 'National Service' – military conscription - was spent with the Royal Army Medical Corps in Singapore and Malaysia. This was a geographical region to which he would return several times in his research. After internships in Toronto and at Massachusetts General Hospital with Alexander Leaf, he was appointed University Tutor in Medicine at Manchester Royal Infirmary. Leaf was a formative influence and an important paper was jointly produced on the role of Anti-Diuretic Hormone and the kidney.

== Research and academic appointments ==
It was at Manchester with Dr. H.E.F. Davies, in 1959, that Wrong wrote a ground-breaking paper on the mechanisms leading to the excretion of acid in human urine. His clinical analysis of this process and the impact of kidney disease made this paper a 'Citation Classic'. Reviewing his time at Manchester, Wrong noted: 'I realise what an excellent education [my years at Manchester] provided by giving me time to tackle my own problems under a benign yet critical supervision. Because of earlier marriage and the rigidity of our postgraduate medical training programme, few of our present graduates feel able to afford such self indulgence'. After an appointment at UCH, Wrong became senior lecturer in medicine at the Hammersmith Hospital. This was followed by appointment to the Chair of Medicine at Dundee University in 1969 and a return to UCH in 1972 to succeed Professor Charles Dent F.R.S. as a Professor of Medicine.

At UCH over the following years, and following retirement in 1990, Wrong developed major insights into the physiology and pathophysiology of the human kidney. Wrong had a parallel interest in the role of the large intestine in salt and water balance and developed much of his own experimental work into a short monograph published in 1981. However, it was his renal work, based initially on the urine acidification test which he developed with Davies, for which Wrong is best known.

== Research highlights ==
The original paper by Wrong and Davies examined the effect of the 'short ammonium chloride loading test' on acid excretion by the kidney. A key insight was that in the group of diseases termed 'Renal Tubular Acidosis' (RTA), urinary excretion of ammonium was relatively well preserved. This was unlike the situation in chronic kidney failure. Furthermore, the paper identified a subset of patients with 'incomplete' RTA. In large part due to Wrong's work, it is now recognized that classical 'distal' or 'Type 1 RTA', due to the disease of the distal tubule, is only one form of the disease. 'Proximal' or 'Type 2 RTA' is another.

The identification of several hereditary forms of RTA was developed by Wrong and co-workers and forms the basis of many of the advances of molecular genetics in this area. By rigorous phenotypic classification, Wrong and other workers showed that 'Type 1 RTA' could have either dominant (SCL4A1 mutation) or recessive inheritance. It was further shown that there were three forms of recessive RTA distinguished clinically and on the basis of molecular generics divided into disease due to SLC4A1 mutation and either the B1 or a4 subunits of the kidney H+-ATPase due to mutation of the ATP6V1B1 andATP6V0A4 genes respectively. Hereditary 'Proximal' or 'Type 2 RTA' may be caused by mutation of the SLC4A4 gene and yet a further 'Type 3 RTA' with combined features of proximal and distal RTA is due to mutation in the CA2 gene for carbonic anhydrase II. These developments in the molecular biology of the kidney may be traced back in large part, though not exclusively, to Wrong's original 1959 paper.

Nephrocalcinosis was a subject on which Wrong was an international expert and he wrote the relevant chapter on this subject for one of the standard nephrology textbooks. It is a summary of his experience of this finding based on almost his entire professional life.

Wrong was unusual in the breadth of his medical interests. His 1981 reference book, The Large Intestine: Its role in Mammalian Nutrition and Homeostasis, summarised research into a part of the human anatomy he felt was neglected due to unprofessional squeamishness on the part of the scientific establishment. "There is a curious reluctance in the medical profession to handle faeces," he said. He began a 1965 paper on the electrolyte content of human waste with the characteristically playful: "Stool is the Cinderella of electrolyte studies."

A great believer in self-experimentation, Wrong invented the "Wrong bags", which allow precious "in vivo" insights into the colon's hidden workings. These were rolled-up ribbons of semi-permeable tubing which could be eaten at breakfast and examined on retrieval distended with faecal fluid allowing comparison of gastrointestinal solute transport in normal subjects and those with kidney failure. Wrong manufactured 5,000 of these "bags" in his laboratory, and while colleagues and family members were recruited as experimental subjects, he swallowed most of them himself.

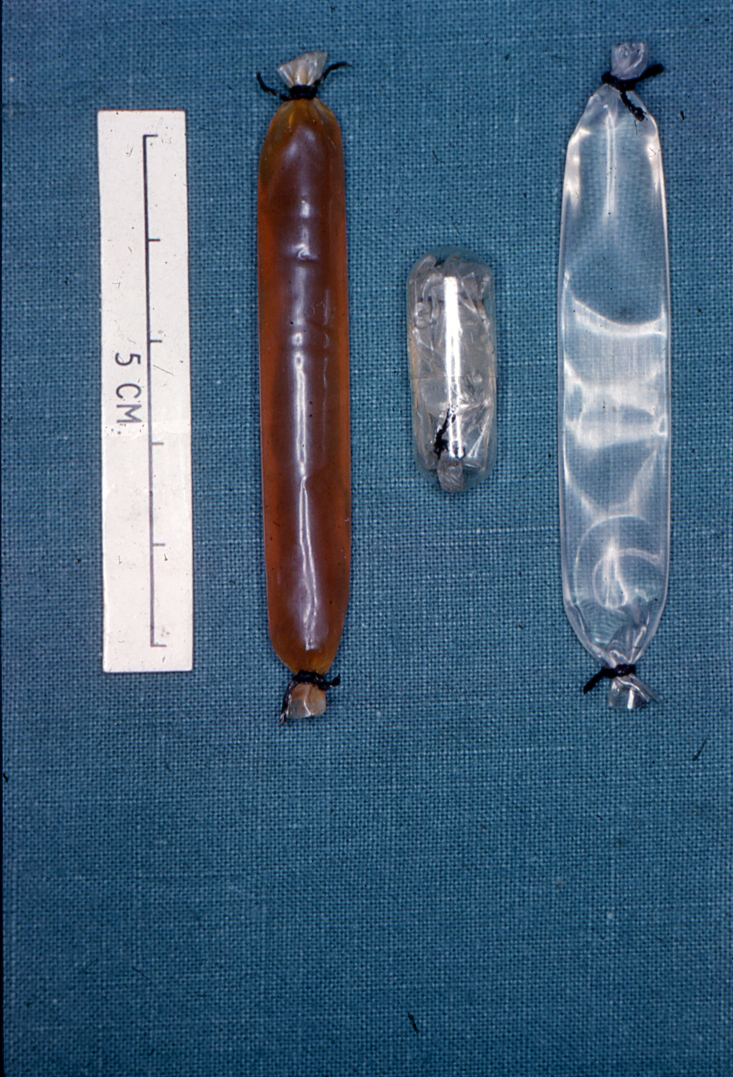
Stool Dialysis

In a major medical insight, Wrong realised that a number of the patients he was seeing in one of his clinics at UCH had an apparently hereditary clinical syndrome very similar to that reported some 20 years earlier by Dent (his predecessor as Professor of Medicine at UCH) and Friedman in 1964. Dent and Friedman originally reported two unrelated patients with the condition they termed 'Hypercalcuric Rickets' without identifying any hereditary component. Wrong, based on his own additional clinical work, discovered that this was a new hereditary disease and with his co-workers Norden and Feest reported it as a form of the renal 'Fanconi Syndrome'.

A very similar hereditary clinical syndrome was reported by Scheinman and colleagues. This clinical work was put on a very firm basis by Thakker, Scheinman and Wrong and colleagues who determined that mutation of the chloride channel gene CLCN5 was the cause of many, though not all, of these disorders including one of the two original patients described by Dent and Friedman. Wrong had already been 'retired' for 6 years when this was published. It became clear that several similar clinical conditions were, on the basis of genetic analysis, the same as that which Wrong had originally termed 'Dent's Disease' in honour of his late mentor. This disease is variously termed Dent's disease or Dent disease. Wrong's insights, which made this previously relatively neglected disease well-known, have prompted the suggestion that the disease should more properly be termed 'Dent-Wrong' disease.

Wrong's identification of Dent and Friedman's second patient as having 'clinical' Dent Disease was expanded when, in 2005, Scheinman's group identified this patient and his family as having mutations not in CLCN5, the gene mutated in most of the families with Dent disease originally identified, but in a quite different gene OCRL1. This gene had been identified earlier as mutated in patients with 'Lowe Syndrome'. Wrong's discoveries had led to the identification of two new 'new' hereditary diseases, each based on one of Dent and Friedman's original patients, and one 'Dent Disease Type 1' due to CLCN5 mutation and the other, 'Dent Disease Type 2' due to OCRL1 mutation.

Wrong, who had been diagnosed with idiopathic pulmonary fibrosis seven years earlier, was working on his final paper when admitted to Intensive Care Unit at UCH, the hospital at which he had spent most of his professional life. The paper, published posthumously, describes a variant of autosomal dominant distal RTA, due to SLC4A1 mutations, originally found in SE Asia. In that final paper, Wrong presented a novel hypothesis to explain the frequency of the mutations in the tropics despite their adverse clinical effects. He suggested that changes in red cell metabolism might protect against malaria, a major killer in the region.

Professor Wrong's papers are stored at the Wellcome Trust Library, 183 Euston Road, London.

== Family ==
Oliver Wrong married Marilda Musacchio, a primary school teacher from the Val d'Aosta, Italy, in 1956. They had three daughters, one of whom is the author and journalist Michela Wrong.
