= Naomi Mitchison =

Scottish novelist and poet (1897–1999)

Naomi Mitchison CBE
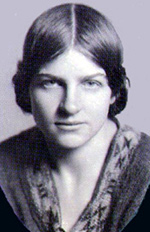
- Mitchison c.1925
- Born: Naomi Mary Margaret Haldane; 1 November 1897; Edinburgh, Scotland
- Died: 11 January 1999 (aged 101); Carradale, Scotland
- Education: Society of Oxford Home Students
- Occupations: Biologist, VAD nurse, writer
- Spouse: Gilbert Richard Mitchison (m. 1916; died 1970)
- Children: Geoffrey Mitchison (1918–1927); Denis Mitchison (1919–2018); Murdoch Mitchison (1922–2011); Avrion Mitchison (1928–2022); Lois Mitchison; Valentine Mitchison; Clemency Mitchison
- Relatives: John Scott Haldane (father); J. B. S. Haldane (brother) Elizabeth Haldane (aunt)
- Writing career
- Language: English
- Period: 1914–15
- Genres: Historical, science fiction, travelogue and autobiography

Naomi Mary Margaret Mitchison, Baroness Mitchison (née Haldane; 1 November 1897 – 11 January 1999), was a Scottish novelist and poet. Often called a doyenne of Scottish literature, she wrote more than 90 books of historical and science fiction, travel writing and autobiography. Her husband Dick Mitchison's life peerage in 1964 entitled her to call herself Lady Mitchison, but she never did. Her 1931 work, The Corn King and the Spring Queen, is seen by some as the prime 20th-century historical novel.

== Childhood, family background and early career ==
Naomi Mary Margaret Haldane was born in Edinburgh, the daughter and younger child of the physiologist John Scott Haldane and his wife (Louisa) Kathleen Trotter. Naomi's parents came from different political backgrounds, her father being a Liberal and her mother from a Conservative, pro-imperialist family. However, both were of landed stock; the Haldane family had been feudal barons of Gleneagles since the 13th century. Today the best-known member of the family is probably Naomi's elder brother, the biologist J. B. S. Haldane (1892–1964), but in her youth her paternal uncle Richard Burdon Haldane, 1st Viscount Haldane, twice Lord Chancellor (from 1912 to 1915 under H. H. Asquith, and in 1924 during the first Labour government of Ramsay MacDonald), was better known.

Naomi followed her brother to the Oxford Preparatory School (later Dragon School) in 1904–1911, as the only girl there. From 1911, she was tutored at home by a governess. She qualified for the University of Oxford in 1914, via the Oxford higher local examination and entered the Society of Oxford Home Students (later St Anne's College) to pursue a degree course in science. However, she chose before completing the course to become a volunteer nursing assistant, as the First World War had broken out. After a course in first aid and home nursing in 1915, she joined a Voluntary Aid Detachment at St Thomas's Hospital, London. Her service was much curtailed after she caught scarlet fever.

The Haldanes were known for their self-styled domestic experiments. She and her brother John started investigating Mendelian genetics in 1908. They initially used guinea pigs as experimental models, but changed to mice as they were more convenient to handle. Their findings were published as "Reduplication in Mice" in 1915. This was in fact the first demonstration of genetic linkage in mammals.

== Literary career ==
Mitchison was a prolific writer of more than 90 books in her lifetime, across a multitude of styles and genres. These include historical novels such as her first novel The Conquered (1923), set in Gaul in the 1st century BCE, during the Gallic Wars of Julius Caesar, and her second novel Cloud Cuckoo Land (1925) set in 5th-century BCE Ancient Greece during the Peloponnesian War. Her best work is thought to be The Corn King and the Spring Queen (1931), which treats three different societies, including a wholly fictional one, and explores themes of sexuality that were daring in her day. Terri Windling called it "a lost classic". Commenting on her collection of stories The Delicate Fire, Rebecca West said "Mrs. Mitchison stands head and shoulders above the writers of her generation, not only in this country."

Literary critic Geoffrey Sadler stated of Mitchison's historical fiction: "On the basis of her early writings, she is unquestionably one of the great historical novelists."

In 1932, Mitchison was commissioned by Victor Gollancz to edit a guide to the modern world for children. Mitchison's book, An Outline for Boys and Girls and Their Parents, included several distinguished contributors, including W. H. Auden, Richard Hughes, Gerald Heard, and Olaf Stapledon. On publication, An Outline was praised by The Times Literary Supplement, the New Statesman and the London Mercury. However, several clergymen, including William Temple, the Archbishop of York, were angered by the book's lack of emphasis on Christianity, while other right-wing authors objected to a perceived sympathy with the Soviet Union. The Conservative writer Arnold Lunn wrote a lengthy attack on the book in the English Review, which contributed to its commercial failure.

Undoubtedly her most controversial work, We Have Been Warned, was published in 1935, based on a journey to the Soviet Union. In it she explored sexual behaviour, including rape and abortion. The book was rejected by various publishers and ultimately censored. She approached first her friend Victor Gollancz, who flatly turned her down, observing that "publication of the book would cause a real outcry." The book was extensively rewritten to make it more acceptable to publishers, and was still subject to censorship. On publication it was universally despised for its depiction of rape, free love and abortion that "alienated readers on the left and horrified those on the political right." In 2005, files from the National Archives revealed that the British government had considered prosecuting the publishers of We Have Been Warned, but ultimately decided not to do so.

Mitchison was a compulsive writer, as her travelogues revealed. She wrote on planes or in trains as prompted by the situation. For example, she wrote up a visit to the US in the 1930s, objecting to sharecropping.

Her 1938 book The Moral Basis of Politics was a treatise on ethics and politics that she had worked on for three years. In it she defended the right of the left-wing journalist H. N. Brailsford to criticise the Moscow Trials, which had caused controversy on the British left at the time.

Mitchison's The Blood of the Martyrs (1939) is set against the background of Nero's persecution of the Christians. She draws parallels between Nero and dictators of her own time, Mussolini and Hitler.

In 1952, Mitchison went to Moscow as a member of the Authors' World Peace Appeal. She frequently visited Africa, especially Botswana, where she was made a sort of tribal mother (Mmarona) to the baKgatla people. Mucking Around (1981) best describes her haphazard travels in five continents over 50 years.

Her later works included further historical novels: The Bull Calves (1947) about the Jacobite rising of 1745 and The Young Alexander the Great (1960). She also turned to fantasy, such as Graeme and the Dragon (1954, Graeme Mitchison being a grandson through Denis), science fiction such as Memoirs of a Spacewoman (1962) and Solution Three (1975), fantasy such as the humorous Arthurian novel To the Chapel Perilous (1955), non-fiction such as African Heroes (1968), and also children's novels, poetry, travel and a three-volume autobiography. She was unsure exactly how many books she had written, often claiming there were about 70. The articles were uncountable, from book reviews for the old Time and Tide magazine and the New Statesman to practical essays on farming, campaigning articles, recollections and reflections.

After her husband's death, Mitchison wrote several memoirs, published as separate titles between 1973 and 1985. She was also a good friend of the writer J. R. R. Tolkien, and one of the proof readers of The Lord of the Rings. Maxim Lieber served as her literary editor in 1935.

== Activism ==
Mitchison, like her brother, was a committed socialist in the 1930s. She visited the Soviet Union in 1932 as part of a Fabian Society group and expressed some misgivings about the direction of Soviet society. An active anti-fascist, Mitchison travelled to Austria, where she undertook the risky task of smuggling documents and left-wing refugees out of the country. She stood unsuccessfully as a Labour Party candidate for the Scottish Universities in 1935, at a time when universities were still allowed to elect MPs. Eventually, as her political candidacy and her pro-Left writings had failed, she gradually became disenchanted with the Left. At that time, she became politically attracted to Scottish Nationalism and increasingly wrote on specifically Scottish issues and themes. She supported the Scottish National Party candidate, William Power in the parliamentary by-election for the Argyllshire constituency in 1940. Later she became active in the Scottish Convention launched by John MacCormick in 1943, serving on its education committee. Her name was on George Orwell's list of people, prepared in March 1949 for the Information Research Department (IRD) set up at the Foreign Office by the Labour government, who were considered to have pro-communist leanings and so be inappropriate to write for the IRD.

Mitchison's advocacy continued in other ways. She was councillor for the East Kintyre ward on Argyll County Council from 1945 to 1966. She initiated the council's school picture scheme under which a fund was established to purchase paintings by contemporary Scottish artists and loan them to schools. The paintings acquired included works by Joan Eardley, Robin Philipson, Anne Redpath and William MacTaggart. She served on the Highland Panel in 1947–1965 and the Highlands and Islands Development Consultative Council in 1966–1976. She became a spokeswoman for the island communities of Scotland. She was a friend of Seretse Khama and an advisor to the Bakgatla tribe of Botswana. Meanwhile, she was a serious botanist, gardener and practical farmer.

Mitchison corresponded with her aunt Elizabeth Haldane, a writer, early suffragist and the first female Justice of the Peace in Scotland, until her death in 1937. While Haldane accepted "the restriction of women's activities to the inside, the personal, the domestic" Mitchison considered this view outdated and they often disagreed.

Mitchison was a vocal campaigner for women's rights, advocating birth control, and was elected a Life Fellow of the Eugenics Society in 1925 before leaving in objection to the group's politics. Her own lack of knowledge of birth control (as stated in her memoirs) led to an interest in the causes of birth control and abortion. She was on the founding council of North Kensington Women's Welfare Centre in London in 1924. Today, she is best known for her advocacy of feminism and her tackling of then-taboo subjects in her writing. She was a principal investor in the Partisan Coffee House, a meeting place for the New Left off Soho Square, which functioned in 1958–1962.

Mitchison was present and supporting a Stop the Seventy Tour rally, aiming to halt the apartheid South African rugby and cricket tours of Britain in December 1969.

== Later life ==
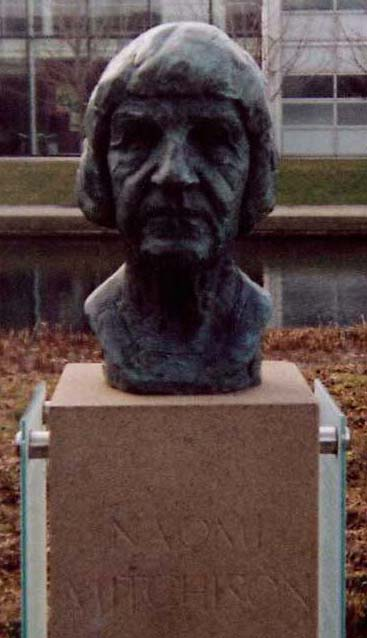
Bust of Mitchison located in South Gyle, Edinburgh

Her husband Dick Mitchison predeceased her in 1970, but she remained active as a writer well into her nineties. Mitchison was appointed Commander of the Order of the British Empire in the 1985 New Year Honours. In her old age she was anxious and depressed about the future, particularly the misuse of scientific development such as nuclear arms. She stated that to experience two world wars in a lifetime was too much. On the other hand, she never exhausted the Haldanes' eccentricity, and once remarked in her biography in Who's Who that her recreation was "burning rubbish".

When asked on her 90th birthday whether she had regrets in life, she replied: "Yes, all the men I never slept with. Imagine!"

She died at Carradale on 11 January 1999 at the age of 101. She was cremated at the Clydebank crematorium on 16 January and her ashes were scattered there.

== Honours and recognitions ==
- Honorary doctorate from the University of Stirling, Scotland, in 1976
- Honorary LLD (Doctor of Law) from the University of Dundee, Scotland, in 1985
- Honorary doctorate from Heriot-Watt University in 1990
- DLitt from the University of Strathclyde, Glasgow, in 1983
- Elected honorary fellow of St Anne's College, Oxford, in 1980, and Wolfson College in 1983
- CBE (Commander of the Order of the British Empire) in 1985
- James Watson (winner of 1962 Nobel Prize in Physiology or Medicine) wrote much of his book The Double Helix while staying with the Mitchisons and dedicated it to her.

== Published works ==
=== Autobiography ===
Mitchison's autobiography is in three parts:

- Small Talk: Memoirs of an Edwardian Childhood (1973; reprinted, with an introductory essay by Ali Smith, Kennedy & Boyd, 2009)
- All Change Here: Girlhood and Marriage (1975) [Small Talk and All Change Here were republished as a single volume As It Was: An Autobiography 1897–1918 in 1975]
- You May Well Ask: A Memoir 1920-1940. London: Fontana Paperbacks. 1986 [1979]. ISBN 978-0-00654-193-6.
- Mucking Around (1981)
- Among You Taking Notes. The Wartime Diary of Naomi Mitchison (1986) (Autobiographical sketches from Mitchison's diaries during the Second World War, written for "Mass Observation", selected and edited by Dorothy Sheridan.)

=== Novels ===
- The Conquered (1923; reprinted, with an introduction by Isobel Murray, Kennedy & Boyd, 2009)
- Cloud Cuckoo Land (1925; reprinted, with an introduction by Isobel Murray, Kennedy & Boyd, 2011)
- The Hostages (1930)
- The Corn King and the Spring Queen (1931)
- Boys and Girls and Gods (1931)
- The Price of Freedom (1931)
- Powers of Light (1932)
- Beyond this Limit (1935; 'Pictures by Wyndham Lewis and Words by Naomi Mitchison')
- We Have Been Warned (1935; reprinted, with an introduction by Isobel Murray, Kennedy & Boyd, 2012)
- The Blood of the Martyrs (1939; reprinted in 1989)
- The Bull Calves (1947; reprinted, with an introduction by Isobel Murray, Kennedy & Boyd, 2013)
- The Big House (1950; reprinted, with an introduction by Moira Burgess, Kennedy & Boyd, 2010)
- Travel Light (Faber and Faber, 1952; Virago Press, 1985; Penguin Books, 1987; Small Beer Press, 2005; reprinted in the UK with The Varangs' Saga, and an introduction by Isobel Murray, Kennedy & Boyd, 2009)
- Graeme and the Dragon (1954)
- The Land the Ravens Found (1955)
- To the Chapel Perilous (1955)
- Little Boxes (1956)
- Behold Your King (1957; reprinted, with an introduction by Moira Burgess, Kennedy & Boyd, 2009)
- Judy and Lakshmi (London: Collins, 1959)
- The Young Alexander the Great (1960)
- The Rib of the Green Umbrella (London: Collins, 1960; illustrated by Edward Ardizzone)
- Memoirs of a Spacewoman (1962; reprinted, with an introduction by Isobel Murray, Kennedy & Boyd, 2011)
- The Fairy who Couldn't Tell a Lie (1963)
- Ketse and the Chief (1965)
- When We Become Men (1965; reprinted, with an introduction by Isobel Murray, Kennedy & Boyd, 2009)
- Friends and Enemies (1966)
- Big Surprise (1967)
- Family at Ditlabeng (1969)
- Don't Look Back (1969)
- The Far Harbour (1969)
- Sun and Moon (1970)
- Cleopatra's People (1972; reprinted, with an introduction by Isobel Murray, Kennedy & Boyd, 2010)
- Sunrise Tomorrow: A Story of Botswana (1973)
- Danish Teapot (1973)
- Solution Three (1975; reprinted with an afterword by Susan Squier, Feminist Press, 1995)
- Snake! (1976)
- Two Magicians (with Dick Mitchison, 1979)
- The Vegetable War (1980)
- Not by Bread Alone (1983)
- Early in Orcadia (1987)
- Images of Africa (1980)
- As It Was (1988)
- The Oath-takers (1991)
- Sea-green Ribbons (1991)
- The Dark Twin (with Marion Campbell, 1998)

=== Collections ===
- When the Bough Breaks and Other Stories (1924; reprinted by Pomona Press, 2006)
- The Laburnum Branch (1926)
- Black Sparta (1928)
- Barbarian Stories (1929)
- The Delicate Fire (1933; reprinted, with an introduction by Isobel Murray, Kennedy & Boyd, 2012)
- The Fourth Pig (1936)
- Five Men and a Swan (1957)
- The Brave Nurse: And Other Stories (1977)
- Cleansing of the Knife: And Other Poems (poems) (1979)
- Images of Africa (1980)
- What Do You Think Yourself: and Other Scottish Short Stories (1982)
- Beyond This Limit: Selected Shorter Fiction of Naomi Mitchison (Scottish Academic Press, 1986; reprinted, with an introduction by Isobel Murray, Kennedy & Boyd, 2008)
- A Girl Must Live: Stories and Poems (poems) (1990)
- The Oath-Takers and Sea-Green Ribbons (Kennedy & Boyd, 2021)
- Barbarian Stories and The Hostages and Boys and Girls and Gods (Kennedy & Boyd, 2021)

=== Plays ===
- Nix-Nought-Nothing: Four Plays for Children (illustrated by Winifred Bromhall, 1928)
- The Price of Freedom. A play in three acts (with Lewis Gielgud Mitchison, 1931)
- An End and a Beginning (1937)
- Spindrift (with Denis Macintosh, 1959)

=== Non-fiction ===
- Anna Comnena (1928; biography – reprinted, with an introduction by Isobel Murray, Kennedy & Boyd, 2009)
- Vienna Diary (1934; reprinted by Kennedy & Boyd, 2009)
- The Moral Basis of Politics (1938; Reprinted 1971)
- "My farming and my neighbours". The Countryman. 30: 23–6. 1944.
- Return to the Fairy Hill (1966)
- African Heroes (1968)
- The Africans: From the Earliest Times to the Present (1971)
- A Life for Africa: The Story of Bram Fischer. 1973. OCLC 705423.
- Oil for the Highlands? (1974)
- Margaret Cole, 1893–1980 (1982)
- Rising Public Voice: Women in Politics Worldwide
- Other People's Worlds : Impressions of Ghana and Nigeria; and Mucking Around : Five Continents Over Fifty Years (Kennedy & Boyd, 2021)
- Bridges of Understanding: African Heroes and Images of Africa (Kennedy & Boyd, 2022)
- Essays and Journalism 1 - The Early Years, and Reminiscing (Kennedy & Boyd, 2009; reprinted 2023)
- Essays and Journalism 2 - Carradale (Kennedy & Boyd, 2009; reprinted 2023), edited and introduced by Moira Burgess
- Essays and Journalism 3 - Scotland (Kennedy & Boyd, 2023)
- Essays and Journalism 4 - Botswana (Kennedy & Boyd, 2023)
- Essays and Journalism 5 - Abroad (Kennedy & Boyd, 2023)
- Essays and Journalism 6 - Politics (Kennedy & Boyd, 2023, includes the complete text of The Moral Basis of Politics)
- Essays and Journalism 7 - Education, Literature and Philosophy (Kennedy & Boyd, 2023)

== Marriage and family ==
On 11 February 1916, Naomi married the barrister Gilbert Richard Mitchison (23 March 1894 – 14 February 1970), who was a close friend of her brother. Mitchison was then on leave from the Western Front; like her, he came from a well-connected and wealthy family. He became a Queen's Counsel, then a Labour politician, and eventually (on 5 October 1964) a life peer as Baron Mitchison of Carradale in the County of Argyll, on retirement for his political work. Naomi thus became Lady Mitchison as the wife of a life peer, but she objected to the title. She played an active part in her husband's political career and in his constituency duties.

Dick and Naomi Mitchison's marriage was not wholly satisfactory. After some years they both agreed to an open marriage, in which they entered into several other relationships that were conducted with dignity and described with humour. Her first serious lover was the Oxford classicist Theodore Wade-Gery, whose scholarship she drew on in writing her historical novels. As described in her autobiography, You May Well Ask: A Memoir 1920–1940, she fell deeply in love with Wade-Gery. She wrote him love poems and missed him greatly after he broke off the relationship, considering it incompatible with his marriage to another woman in 1928. She mitigated her sorrow by undertaking a risky mission to help persecuted socialists in fascist-dominated Austria. Later, she had several briefer, less intense affairs, in which the men were in love with her and she did her best to reciprocate. As she emphasized in describing these, she took care to use contraceptives with her lovers and to let her children be fathered by her husband alone – although she dreamed of a future in which her daughters would be able to "have children by several chosen fathers, uncensured".

Naomi and Dick had seven children. Their four sons were Geoffrey (1918–1927), who died of meningitis, Denis (1919–2018), a professor of bacteriology, Murdoch (1922–2011), and Avrion (1928–2022), both professors of zoology. Their three daughters were Lois (born 1926), Valentine (born 1928), and Clemency, who died in 1940, shortly after her birth.

Between 1923 and 1939, they lived at Rivercourt House, Upper Mall, Hammersmith, London. They bought the Carradale House at Carradale in Kintyre in 1939, where they lived for the rest of their lives. The house was frequented by people of all sorts: lords, ladies, politicians, writers, neighbours, fishermen and farmers. She and Denis MacIntosh, a local fisherman, wrote a documentary, Men and Herring: A Documentary, in 1949. Ten years later, this was adapted for BBC Television as a docudrama, Spindrift.

== Reviews ==
- Fullerton, Ian (1980), review of Images of Africa, Cencrastus No. 4, Winter 1980–1981, pp. 37 and 38, ISSN 0264-0856
