= First Blair ministry =

1997–2001 United Kingdom government

- Cabinet of the United Kingdom
- 1997–2001
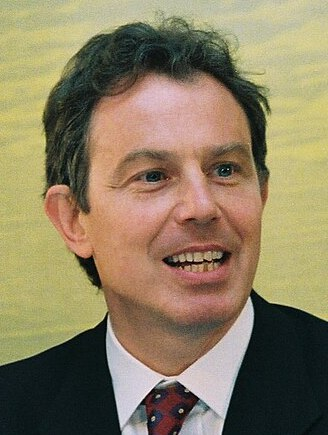
- Blair in May 1997
- Date formed: 2 May 1997
- Date dissolved: 8 June 2001

People and organisations
- Monarch: Elizabeth II
- Prime Minister: Tony Blair
- Prime Minister's history: Premiership of Tony Blair
- Deputy Prime Minister: John Prescott
- Member party: Labour Party
- Status in legislature: Majority
- Opposition cabinet: Major shadow cabinet; Hague shadow cabinet
- Opposition party: Conservative Party
- Opposition leader: John Major (1997); William Hague (1997–2001)

History
- Election: 1997 general election
- Outgoing election: 2001 general election
- Legislature terms: 52nd UK Parliament
- Budgets: 1997 budget; 1998 budget; 1999 budget; 2000 budget; 2001 budget
- Predecessor: Second Major ministry
- Successor: Second Blair ministry

The first Blair ministry lasted from May 1997 to June 2001. Following eighteen years in opposition, Labour ousted the Conservatives at the May 1997 election with a 179-seat majority, thus ending the Conservatives' long period in office under the various ministries of Margaret Thatcher and John Major. The Prime Minister, Tony Blair, who turned 44 years old days after leading Labour to victory, was the youngest prime minister of the twentieth century and the first Labour Prime Minister since James Callaghan.

== Cabinet ==
Portfolio	Minister	Term
Cabinet ministers
Prime Minister; First Lord of the Treasury; Minister for the Civil Service	Tony Blair	1997–2007
Deputy Prime Minister	John Prescott	1997–2007
Secretary of State for the Environment, Transport and the Regions	John Prescott	1997–2001
Chancellor of the Exchequer; Second Lord of the Treasury	Gordon Brown	1997–2007
Lord High Chancellor of Great Britain	Derry Irvine, Baron Irvine of Lairg	1997–2003
Leader of the House of Commons; Lord President of the Council	Ann Taylor	1997–1998
Leader of the House of Commons; Lord President of the Council	Margaret Beckett	1998–2001
Leader of the House of Lords; Lord Keeper of the Privy Seal	Ivor Richard	1997–1998
Leader of the House of Lords; Lord Keeper of the Privy Seal	Margaret Jay, Baroness Jay of Paddington	1998–2001
Chief Secretary to the Treasury	Alistair Darling	1997–1998
Chief Secretary to the Treasury	Stephen Byers	1998
Chief Secretary to the Treasury	Alan Milburn	1998–1999
Chief Secretary to the Treasury	Andrew Smith	1999–2002
Minister for the Cabinet Office; Chancellor of the Duchy of Lancaster	David Clark	1997–1998
Minister for the Cabinet Office; Chancellor of the Duchy of Lancaster	Jack Cunningham	1998–1999
Minister for the Cabinet Office; Chancellor of the Duchy of Lancaster	Mo Mowlam	1999–2001
Foreign Secretary	Robin Cook	1997–2001
Home Secretary	Jack Straw	1997–2001
Minister of Agriculture, Fisheries and Food	Jack Cunningham	1997–1998
Minister of Agriculture, Fisheries and Food	Nick Brown	1998–2001
Secretary of State for Health	Frank Dobson	1997–1999
Secretary of State for Health	Alan Milburn	1999–2003
Secretary of State for Defence	George Robertson	1997–1999
Secretary of State for Defence	Geoff Hoon	1999–2005
Secretary of State for Social Security	Harriet Harman	1997–1998
Secretary of State for Social Security	Alistair Darling	1998–2001
Secretary of State for Education and Employment	David Blunkett	1997–2001
Secretary of State for Trade and Industry; President of the Board of Trade	Margaret Beckett	1997–1998
Secretary of State for Trade and Industry; President of the Board of Trade	Peter Mandelson	1998
Secretary of State for Trade and Industry; President of the Board of Trade	Stephen Byers	1998–2001
Secretary of State for Culture, Media and Sport	Chris Smith	1997–2001
Secretary of State for International Development	Clare Short	1997–2003
Secretary of State for Northern Ireland	Mo Mowlam	1997–1999
Secretary of State for Northern Ireland	Peter Mandelson	1999–2001
Secretary of State for Northern Ireland	John Reid	2001–2002
Secretary of State for Scotland	Donald Dewar	1997–1999
Secretary of State for Scotland	John Reid	1999–2001
Secretary of State for Scotland	Helen Liddell	2001–2003
Secretary of State for Wales	Ron Davies	1997–1998
Secretary of State for Wales	Alun Michael	1998–1999
Secretary of State for Wales	Paul Murphy	1999–2002
Minister of State for Transport	Gavin Strang	1997–1998
Minister Without Portfolio	Peter Mandelson	1997–1998
Also attending cabinet meetings
Chief Whip	Nick Brown	1997–1998
Chief Whip	Ann Taylor	1998–2001
Attorney General for England and Wales	John Morris	1997–1999
Attorney General for England and Wales	Gareth Williams, Baron Williams of Mostyn	1999–2001

=== Changes ===
- July 1998 – 1999 British cabinet reshuffle
- October 1998 – Alun Michael becomes Welsh Secretary. Ron Davies leaves the Cabinet.
- December 1998 – Peter Mandelson is dismissed from the cabinet over a secret home loan he received from Geoffrey Robinson. Stephen Byers becomes Trade & Industry Secretary. Alan Milburn becomes Chief Secretary to the Treasury.
- May 1999 – John Reid becomes Scottish Secretary. Donald Dewar leaves the cabinet.
- July 1999 – Paul Murphy becomes Welsh Secretary. Alun Michael leaves the cabinet.
- October 1999 – Andrew Smith becomes Chief Secretary to the Treasury. Geoff Hoon becomes Defence Secretary. Alan Milburn becomes Health Secretary. Peter Mandelson returns to the cabinet as Northern Ireland Secretary. Mo Mowlam becomes Cabinet Office Minister and Chancellor of the Duchy of Lancaster. Gareth Williams becomes Attorney General. John Morris, George Robertson, Jack Cunningham and Frank Dobson leave the cabinet.
- January 2001 – Peter Mandelson is dismissed as Northern Ireland Secretary and is succeeded by John Reid. Helen Liddell enters the cabinet and succeeds John Reid as Scottish Secretary.

== List of ministers ==
=== Prime Minister, the Cabinet Office and non-departmental ministers ===
Cabinet Office
Prime Minister of the United Kingdom; First Lord of the Treasury; Minister for the Civil Service	Tony Blair	May 1997 – June 2001
Deputy Prime Minister	John Prescott	May 1997 – June 2001
Minister for the Cabinet Office; Chancellor of the Duchy of Lancaster	David Clark	May 1997 – July 1998
Minister for the Cabinet Office; Chancellor of the Duchy of Lancaster	Jack Cunningham	July 1998 – October 1999
Minister for the Cabinet Office; Chancellor of the Duchy of Lancaster	Mo Mowlam	October 1999 – June 2001
Minister of State for the Cabinet Office; Minister of State at the Office of Public Service	Derek Foster	May 1997
Minister of State for the Cabinet Office; Minister of State at the Office of Public Service	Peter Kilfoyle	May 1997 – July 1999
Minister of State for the Cabinet Office; Minister of State at the Office of Public Service	Ian McCartney	July 1999 – June 2001
Minister of State for the Cabinet Office; Minister of State at the Office of Public Service	Charlie Falconer, Baron Falconer of Thoroton	July 1998 - June 2001
Parliamentary Secretary to the Cabinet Office	Graham Stringer	November 1999 - June 2001
Lord High Chancellor of Great Britain	Derry Irvine, Baron Irvine of Lairg	May 1997 – June 2001
Minister Without Portfolio	Peter Mandelson	May 1997 – July 1998
Parliamentary Private Secretary to the Prime Minister	Ann Coffey	May 1997 – July 1998
Parliamentary Private Secretary to the Prime Minister	Bruce Grocott	May 1997 – June 2001

=== Departments of state ===
Treasury
Chancellor of the Exchequer	Gordon Brown	May 1997 – June 2001
Chief Secretary to the Treasury	Alistair Darling	May 1997 – July 1998
Chief Secretary to the Treasury	Stephen Byers	July 1998 – December 1998
Chief Secretary to the Treasury	Alan Milburn	December 1998 – October 1999
Chief Secretary to the Treasury	Andrew Smith	October 1999 – June 2001
Paymaster General	Geoffrey Robinson	May 1997 – December 1998
Paymaster General	Dawn Primarolo	January 1999 – June 2001
Financial Secretary to the Treasury	Dawn Primarolo	May 1997 – January 1999
Financial Secretary to the Treasury	Barbara Roche	January 1999 – July 1999
Financial Secretary to the Treasury	Stephen Timms	July 1999 – June 2001
Economic Secretary to the Treasury	Helen Liddell	May 1997 – July 1998
Economic Secretary to the Treasury	Patricia Hewitt	July 1998 – May 1999
Economic Secretary to the Treasury	Melanie Johnson	May 1999 – June 2001
Minister of State for Trade & Competitiveness in Europe, (jointly with Trade & Industry)	David Simon, Baron Simon of Highbury	May 1997 - July 1999

Foreign and Commonwealth Office
Foreign Secretary	Robin Cook	May 1997 – June 2001
Minister of State for Foreign Affairs	Tony Lloyd	May 1997 – July 1999
Minister of State for Foreign Affairs	John Battle	July 1999 – June 2001
Minister of State for Europe	Doug Henderson	May 1997 – July 1998
Minister of State for Europe	Joyce Quin	July 1998 – July 1999
Minister of State for Europe	Geoff Hoon	July 1999 – October 1999
Minister of State for Europe	Keith Vaz	October 1999 – June 2001
Minister of State for Africa	Derek Fatchett	May 1997 – May 1999
Minister of State for Africa	Geoff Hoon	May 1999 – July 1999
Minister of State for Africa	Peter Hain	July 1999 – January 2001
Minister of State for Africa	Brian Wilson	January 2001 – June 2001
Parliamentary Under-Secretary of State for Foreign Affairs	Elizabeth Symons, Baroness Symons of Vernham Dean	May 1997 – June 1999
Parliamentary Under-Secretary of State for Foreign Affairs	Patricia Scotland, Baroness Scotland of Asthal	June 1999 – June 2001

Home Office
Home Secretary	Jack Straw	May 1997 – June 2001
Minister of State for Home Affairs	Alun Michael	May 1997 – October 1998
Minister of State for Home Affairs	Paul Boateng	October 1998 – June 2001
Minister of State for Prisons	Joyce Quin	May 1997 – July 1998
Minister of State for Prisons	Gareth Williams, Baron Williams of Mostyn	July 1998 – July 1999
Minister of State for Prisons	Charles Clarke	July 1999 – June 2001
Minister of State for Asylum and Immigration	Barbara Roche	July 1999 – June 2001
Parliamentary Under-Secretary of State for Home Affairs	Gareth Williams, Baron Williams of Mostyn	May 1997 – July 1998
Parliamentary Under-Secretary of State for Home Affairs	Kate Hoey	July 1998 – July 1999
Parliamentary Under-Secretary of State for Home Affairs	Steve Bassam, Baron Bassam of Brighton	July 1999 – June 2001
Parliamentary Under-Secretary of State for Immigration	Mike O'Brien	May 1997 – June 2001
Parliamentary Under Secretary of State for Prisons, Drugs & Elections	George Howarth	May 1997 - July 1999

Department of Environment, Transport and the Regions
Secretary of State for the Environment, Transport and the Regions	John Prescott	May 1997 – June 2001
Minister of State for the Environment	Michael Meacher	May 1997 – June 2001
Minister of State for Transport	Gavin Strang	May 1997 – June 1998
Minister of State for Transport	John Reid	June 1998 – May 1999
Minister of State for Transport	Helen Liddell	May 1999 – July 1999
Minister of State for Transport	Gus Macdonald, Baron Macdonald of Tradeston	July 1999 – June 2001
Minister of State for Housing and Planning	Hilary Armstrong	May 1997 – July 1999
Minister of State for Housing and Planning	Nick Raynsford	July 1999 – June 2001
Minister of State for the Regions	Richard Caborn	May 1997 – July 1999
Minister of State for the Regions	Nick Raynsford	July 1999 – June 2001
Minister for London	Nick Raynsford	May 1997 – July 1999
Minister for London	Keith Hill	July 1999 – June 2001
Minister of State for Local Government, Regions	Hilary Armstrong	May 1997 - June 2001
Parliamentary Under-Secretary of State for Transport	Glenda Jackson	May 1997 – July 1999
Parliamentary Under-Secretary of State for Transport	Keith Hill	July 1999 – June 2001
Parliamentary Under-Secretary of State for Roads	Helene Hayman, Baroness Hayman	May 1997 – July 1998
Parliamentary Under-Secretary of State for Roads	Larry Whitty, Baron Whitty	July 1998 – June 2001
Parliamentary Under-Secretary of State for Construction	Nick Raynsford	May 1997 – July 1999
Parliamentary Under Secretary of State for Energy, Environment & the Regions	Angela Eagle	May 1997 - July 1998
Parliamentary Under Secretary of State for Energy, Environment & the Regions	Alan Meale	July 1998 - July 1999
Parliamentary Under Secretary of State	Chris Mullin	July 1999 - January 2001
Parliamentary Under Secretary of State	Bob Ainsworth	January - June 2001
Parliamentary Under Secretary of State	Beverley Hughes	July 1999 - June 2001

Ministry of Agriculture, Fisheries and Food
Minister of Agriculture, Fisheries and Food	Jack Cunningham	May 1997 – July 1998
Minister of Agriculture, Fisheries and Food	Nick Brown	July 1998 – June 2001
Minister of State for Agriculture, Fisheries and Food	Jeff Rooker	May 1997 – July 1999
Minister of State for Agriculture, Fisheries and Food	Joyce Quin	July 1999 – June 2001
Parliamentary Under-Secretary of State for Fisheries and the Countryside	Elliot Morley	May 1997 – June 2001
Parliamentary Under Secretary of State for Farming & the Food Industry	Bernard Donoughue, Baron Donoughue	May 1997 - July 1999
Parliamentary Under Secretary of State for Farming & the Food Industry	Helene Hayman, Baroness Hayman	July 1999 - June 2001

Defence
Secretary of State for Defence	George Robertson	May 1997 – October 1999
Secretary of State for Defence	Geoff Hoon	October 1999 – June 2001
Minister of State for the Armed Forces	John Reid	May 1997 – July 1998
Minister of State for the Armed Forces	Doug Henderson	July 1998 – July 1999
Minister of State for the Armed Forces	John Spellar	July 1999 – June 2001
Minister of State for Defence Procurement	John Gilbert, Baron Gilbert	May 1997 – July 1999
Minister of State for Defence Procurement	Elizabeth Symons, Baroness Symons of Vernham Dean	July 1999 – June 2001
Parliamentary Under-Secretary of State for Defence	John Spellar	May 1997 – July 1999
Parliamentary Under-Secretary of State for Defence	Peter Kilfoyle	July 1999 – January 2000
Parliamentary Under-Secretary of State for Defence	Lewis Moonie	January 2000 – June 2001

Department for Education and Employment
Secretary of State for Education and Employment	David Blunkett	May 1997 – June 2001
Minister of State for School Standards	Stephen Byers	May 1997 – July 1998
Minister of State for School Standards	Estelle Morris	July 1998 – June 2001
Minister of State for Employment and Disability Rights *Deputy Minister for Women, also Minister for the New Deal	Andrew Smith	May 1997 – October 1999
Minister of State for Employment and Disability Rights *Deputy Minister for Women, also Minister for the New Deal	Tessa Jowell*	October 1999 – June 2001
Minister of State	Tessa Blackstone, Baroness Blackstone	May 1997 - June 2001
Parliamentary Under Secretary of State for Employment & Equal Opportunities	Alan Howarth, Baron Howarth of Newport	May 1997 - July 1998
Parliamentary Under-Secretary of State for Education and Employment	Estelle Morris	May 1997 – July 1998
Parliamentary Under-Secretary of State for Education and Employment	George Mudie	July 1998 – July 1999
Parliamentary Under-Secretary of State for Education and Employment	Jacqui Smith	July 1999 – June 2001
Parliamentary Under Secretary of State for Lifelong Learning	Kim Howells	May 1997 - July 1998
Parliamentary Under Secretary of State	Margaret Hodge	July 1998 - June 2001
Parliamentary Under Secretary of State	Charles Clarke	July 1998 - July 1999
Parliamentary Under Secretary of State	Malcolm Wicks	July 1999 - June 2001
Parliamentary Under Secretary of State	Michael Wills	July 1999 - June 2001

Health
Secretary of State for Health	Frank Dobson	May 1997 – October 1999
Secretary of State for Health	Alan Milburn	October 1999 – June 2001
Minister of State for Health Services	Alan Milburn	May 1997 – December 1998
Minister of State for Health Services	John Denham	December 1998 – June 2001
Minister of State for Public Health	Tessa Jowell (Deputy Minister for Women July 1998 - October 1999)	May 1997 – October 1999
Minister of State for Public Health	John Hutton	October 1999 – June 2001
Minister of State	Margaret Jay, Baroness Jay of Paddington	May 1997 - July 1998
Parliamentary Under-Secretary of State for Health	Helene Hayman, Baroness Hayman	July 1998 – July 1999
Parliamentary Under-Secretary of State for Health	Gisela Stuart	July 1999 – June 2001
Parliamentary Under Secretary of State for Social Care & Mental Health	Paul Boateng	May 1997 - October 1998
Parliamentary Under Secretary of State for Social Care & Mental Health	John Hutton	October 1998 - October 1999
Parliamentary Under Secretary of State for Social Care & Mental Health	Yvette Cooper	October 1999 - June 2001
Parliamentary Under Secretary of State	Philip Hunt, Baron Hunt of Kings Heath	January 1998 - June 2001

Department of Social Security
Secretary of State for Social Security	Harriet Harman, (Minister for Women)	May 1997 – July 1998
Secretary of State for Social Security	Alistair Darling	July 1998 – June 2001
Minister for Welfare Reform	Frank Field	May 1997 – July 1998
Minister of State for Pensions	John Denham	June 1998 – December 1998
Minister of State for Pensions	Stephen Timms	January 1999 – July 1999
Minister of State for Pensions	Jeff Rooker	July 1999 – June 2001
Parliamentary Under-Secretary of State for Social Security	Joan Ruddock (Deputy Minister for Women)	May 1997 – July 1998
Parliamentary Under-Secretary of State for Social Security	Hugh Bayley	January 1999 – June 2001
Parliamentary Under Secretary of State, Minister for Pensions	John Denham	May 1997 - June 1998
Parliamentary Under Secretary of State for Income-related Benefits	Keith Bradley, Baron Bradley	May 1997 - July 1998
Parliamentary Under Secretary of State for Child Benefit, Child Support & War Pensions	Patricia Hollis, Baroness Hollis of Heigham	May 1997 - June 2001
Parliamentary Under Secretary of State for Pensions	Stephen Timms	July 1998 -December 1998
Parliamentary Under Secretary of State	Angela Eagle	July 1998 -June 2001

Department of Culture, Media and Sport
Secretary of State for Culture, Media and Sport	Chris Smith	May 1997 – June 2001
Minister for Film, Tourism and Broadcasting	Tom Clarke	May 1997 – July 1998
Minister for Film, Tourism and Broadcasting	Janet Anderson	July 1998 – June 2001
Parliamentary Under-Secretary of State for the Arts	Mark Fisher	May 1997 – June 1998
Parliamentary Under-Secretary of State for the Arts	Alan Howarth	June 1998 – June 2001
Minister for Sport	Tony Banks, Baron Stratford	May 1997 - July 1999
Minister for Sport	Kate Hoey	July 1999 - June 2001

Trade and Industry
Secretary of State for Trade and Industry; President of the Board of Trade	Margaret Beckett	May 1997 – July 1998
Secretary of State for Trade and Industry; President of the Board of Trade	Peter Mandelson	July 1998 – December 1998
Secretary of State for Trade and Industry; President of the Board of Trade	Stephen Byers	December 1998 – June 2001
Minister of State for Trade and Industry	John Battle	May 1997 – July 1999
Minister of State for Trade	Stanley Clinton-Davis, Baron Clinton-Davis	May 1997 – July 1998
Minister of State for Trade	Brian Wilson	July 1998 – July 1999
Minister of State for Trade	Richard Caborn	July 1999 – June 2001
Minister of State for Competitiveness	Ian McCartney	May 1997 – July 1999
Minister of State for Small Business & E-Commerce	Patricia Hewitt	July 1999 - June 2001
Minister of State for Energy and Competitiveness in Europe (jointly with Treasury to July 1999)	David Simon, Baron Simon of Highbury	May 1997 – July 1999
Minister of State for Energy and Competitiveness in Europe (jointly with Treasury to July 1999)	Helen Liddell	July 1999 – January 2001
Minister of State for Energy and Competitiveness in Europe (jointly with Treasury to July 1999)	Peter Hain	January 2001 – June 2001
Parliamentary Under-Secretary of State for Trade and Industry	Nigel Griffiths	May 1997 – July 1998
Parliamentary Under-Secretary of State for Trade and Industry	Kim Howells	July 1998 – June 2001
Parliamentary Under Secretary of State for Small Firms, Trade & Industry	Barbara Roche	May 1997 - January 1999
Parliamentary Under Secretary of State for Small Firms, Trade & Industry	Michael Wills	January 1999 - July 1999
Parliamentary Under Secretary of State for Small Firms, Trade & Industry	Alan Johnson	July 1999 - June 2001
Parliamentary Under Secretary of State, Minister for Sciences	David Sainsbury, Baron Sainsbury of Turville	July 1998 - June 2001

Department of International Development
Secretary of State for International Development	Clare Short	May 1997 – June 2001
Parliamentary Under-Secretary of State for International Development	George Foulkes	May 1997 – January 2001
Parliamentary Under-Secretary of State for International Development	Chris Mullin	January 2001 – June 2001

Lord Chancellors Department
Lord Chancellor	Derry Irvine, Baron Irvine of Lairg	May 1997 - June 2001
Minister of State	Geoff Hoon	July 1998 - May 1999
Parliamentary Under Secretary of State	Geoff Hoon	May 1997 - July 1998
Parliamentary Under Secretary of State	Keith Vaz	May - July 1999
Parliamentary Under Secretary of State	David Lock	July 1999 - June 2001
Parliamentary Under Secretary of State	Jane Kennedy	October 1999 - June 2001
Parliamentary Under Secretary of State	Willy Bach, Baron Bach	November 2000 - June 2001

Scottish Office
Secretary of State for Scotland	Donald Dewar	May 1997 – May 1999
Secretary of State for Scotland	John Reid	May 1999 – January 2001
Secretary of State for Scotland	Helen Liddell	January - June 2001
Minister of State for Scotland	Henry McLeish	May 1997 – June 1999
Minister of State for Scotland	Brian Wilson	May 1997 – July 1998
Minister of State for Scotland	Helen Liddell	July 1998 – May 1999
Minister of State for Scotland	Brian Wilson	July 1999 – January 2001
Minister of State for Scotland	George Foulkes	January - June 2001
Parliamentary Under-Secretary of State for Scotland	Malcolm Chisholm	May 1997 – December 1997
Parliamentary Under-Secretary of State for Scotland	Sam Galbraith	May 1997 – May 1999
Parliamentary Under-Secretary of State for Scotland	John Sewel, Baron Sewel	May 1997 – July 1999
Parliamentary Under-Secretary of State for Scotland	Calum MacDonald	December 1997 – July 1999
Parliamentary Under-Secretary of State for Scotland	Gus Macdonald, Baron MacDonald of Tradeston	August 1998 – July 1999

Wales Office
Secretary of State for Wales	Ron Davies	May 1997 – October 1998
Secretary of State for Wales	Alun Michael	October 1998 – July 1999
Secretary of State for Wales	Paul Murphy	July 1999 – June 2001
Parliamentary Under-Secretary of State for Wales	Peter Hain	May 1997 – July 1999
Parliamentary Under-Secretary of State for Wales	Win Griffiths	May 1997 – July 1998
Parliamentary Under-Secretary of State for Wales	Jon Owen Jones	July 1998 – July 1999
Parliamentary Under-Secretary of State for Wales	David Hanson	July 1999 – June 2001

Northern Ireland Office
Secretary of State for Northern Ireland	Mo Mowlam	May 1997 – October 1999
Secretary of State for Northern Ireland	Peter Mandelson	October 1999 – January 2001
Secretary of State for Northern Ireland	John Reid	January 2001 – June 2001
Minister of State for Northern Ireland	Adam Ingram	May 1997 – June 2001
Minister of State for Northern Ireland	Paul Murphy, Baron Murphy of Torfaen	May 1997 - July 1999
Parliamentary Under-Secretary of State for Northern Ireland	Alf Dubs, Baron Dubs	May 1997 – December 1999
Parliamentary Under-Secretary of State for Northern Ireland	Tony Worthington	May 1997 – July 1998
Parliamentary Under-Secretary of State for Northern Ireland	John McFall	July 1998 – December 1999
Parliamentary Under-Secretary of State for Northern Ireland	George Howarth	July 1999 – June 2001

=== Law officers ===
Law Officers
Attorney General for England and Wales	John Morris	May 1997 – July 1999
Attorney General for England and Wales	Gareth Williams, Baron Williams of Mostyn	July 1999 – June 2001
Solicitor General for England and Wales	Charlie Falconer, Baron Falconer of Thoroton	May 1997 – July 1998
Solicitor General for England and Wales	Ross Cranston	July 1998 – June 2001
Advocate General for Scotland	Lynda Clark	May 1999 – June 2001
Solicitor General for Scotland	Colin Boyd, Baron Boyd of Duncansby	May 1997 - February 2000
Solicitor General for Scotland	Neil Davidson, Baron Davidson of Glen Clova	February 2000 - June 2001
Lord Advocate	Andrew Hardie, Baron Hardie	May 1997 - February 2000
Lord Advocate	Colin Boyd, Baron Boyd of Duncansby	February 2000 - June 2001

=== Parliament ===
Parliament
Leader of the House of Commons; Lord President of the Council	Ann Taylor	May 1997 – July 1998
Leader of the House of Commons; Lord President of the Council	Margaret Beckett	July 1998 – June 2001
Deputy Leader of the House of Commons	Paddy Tipping	December 1998 – June 2001
Leader of the House of Lords; Lord Keeper of the Privy Seal	Ivor Richard, Baron Richard	May 1997 – July 1998
Leader of the House of Lords; Lord Keeper of the Privy Seal	Margaret Jay, Baroness Jay of Paddington, (Minister for Women)	July 1998 – June 2001
Deputy Leader of the House of Lords	Margaret Jay, Baroness Jay of Paddington	May 1997 – July 1998
Deputy Leader of the House of Lords	Gareth Williams, Baron Williams of Mostyn	October 1998 – June 2001

=== Whips ===
Whips
Government Chief Whip; Parliamentary Secretary to the Treasury	Nick Brown	May 1997 – July 1998
Government Chief Whip; Parliamentary Secretary to the Treasury	Ann Taylor	July 1998 – June 2001
Deputy Chief Whip; Treasurer of the Household	George Mudie	May 1997 – July 1998
Deputy Chief Whip; Treasurer of the Household	Keith Bradley	July 1998 – June 2001
Comptroller of the Household	Tommy McAvoy	May 1997 – June 2001
Vice-Chamberlain of the Household	Janet Anderson	May 1997 – July 1998
Vice-Chamberlain of the Household	Graham Allen	July 1998 – June 2001
Junior Lords of the Treasury; Whips	Bob Ainsworth	May 1997 - January 2001
Junior Lords of the Treasury; Whips	Graham Allen	May 1997 - July 1998
Junior Lords of the Treasury; Whips	Jim Dowd	May 1997 - June 2001
Junior Lords of the Treasury; Whips	John McFall, Baron McFall of Alcluith	May 1997 - July 1998
Junior Lords of the Treasury; Whips	Jon Owen Jones	May 1997 - July 1998
Junior Lords of the Treasury; Whips	Clive Betts	July 1998 - June 2001
Junior Lords of the Treasury; Whips	David Jamieson	July 1998 - June 2001
Junior Lords of the Treasury; Whips	Jane Kennedy	July 1998 - October 1999
Junior Lords of the Treasury; Whips	Greg Pope	November 1999 - June 2001
Junior Lords of the Treasury; Whips	David Clelland	February - June 2001
Assistant Whips	Clive Betts	May 1997 -July 1998
Assistant Whips	David Clelland	May 1997 - February 2001
Assistant Whips	Kevin Hughes	May 1997 - June 2001
Assistant Whips	David Jamieson	May 1997 - July 1998
Assistant Whips	Jane Kennedy	May 1997 - July 1998
Assistant Whips	Greg Pope	May 1997 - November 1999
Assistant Whips	Bridget Prentice	May 1997 - July 1998
Assistant Whips	Anne McGuire	July 1998 - May 2001
Assistant Whips	David Hanson	July 1998 - July 1999
Assistant Whips	Mike Hall	July 1998 - June 2001
Assistant Whips	Keith Hill	July 1998 - July 1999
Assistant Whips	Gerry Sutcliffe	July 1999 - June 2001
Assistant Whips	Tony McNulty	October 1999 - May 2001
Assistant Whips	Don Touhig	November 1999 - June 2001
Assistant Whips	Ian Pearson	February - June 2001
Government Chief Whip in the House of Lords; Captain of the Honourable Corps of Gentlemen-at-Arms	Denis Carter, Baron Carter	May 1997 – June 2001
Deputy Chief Whip in the House of Lords; Captain of the Yeomen of the Guard	Andrew McIntosh, Baron McIntosh of Haringey	May 1997 – June 2001
Lords & Baronesses-in-Waiting Whips	Simon Haskel, Baron Haskel	May 1997 - July 1998
Lords & Baronesses-in-Waiting Whips	Larry Whitty, Baron Whitty	May 1997 - July 1998
Lords & Baronesses-in-Waiting Whips	Doug Hoyle, Baron Hoyle	May 1997 - April 1999
Lords & Baronesses-in-Waiting Whips	Joyce Gould, Baroness Gould of Potternewton	May 1997 - July 1998
Lords & Baronesses-in-Waiting Whips	Josie Farrington, Baroness Farrington of Ribbleton	May 1997 - June 2001
Lords & Baronesses-in-Waiting Whips	Philip Hunt, Baron Hunt of Kings Heath	July 1998 - July 1999
Lords & Baronesses-in-Waiting Whips	Valerie Amos, Baroness Amos	July 1998 - June 2001
Lords & Baronesses-in-Waiting Whips	Meta Ramsay, Baroness Ramsay of Cartvale	July 1998 - June 2001
Lords & Baronesses-in-Waiting Whips	Tom Burlison, Baron Burlison	January 1999 - June 2000
Lords & Baronesses-in-Waiting Whips	Willy Bach, Baron Bach	July 1999 - November 2000
Lords & Baronesses-in-Waiting Whips	Bryan Davies, Baron Davies of Oldham	July 2000 - June 2001

== Notes ==
Preceded by Second Major ministry	Government of the United Kingdom; 1997–2001	Succeeded by Second Blair ministry
