= List of 2003 British incumbents =

This is a list of 2003 British incumbents.

== UK government ==
- Monarch
  - Head of State – Elizabeth II, Queen of the United Kingdom (1952–2022)
- Prime Minister
  - Head of Government – Tony Blair, Prime Minister of the United Kingdom (1997–2007)
- Deputy Prime Minister
  - Deputy Head of Government – John Prescott, Deputy Prime Minister of the United Kingdom (1997–2007)
- First Secretary of State
  - John Prescott, First Secretary of State (1997–2007)
- First Lord of the Treasury
  - Tony Blair, First Lord of the Treasury (1997–2007)
- Minister for the Civil Service
  - Tony Blair, Minister for the Civil Service (1997–2007)
- Chancellor of the Exchequer
  - Gordon Brown, Chancellor of the Exchequer (1997–2007)
- Second Lord of the Treasury
  - Gordon Brown, Second Lord of the Treasury (1997–2007)
- Secretary of State for Foreign and Commonwealth Affairs
  - Jack Straw, Secretary of State for Foreign and Commonwealth Affairs (2001–2007)
- Secretary of State for the Home Department
  - David Blunkett, Secretary of State for the Home Department (2001–2007)
- Secretary of State for Environment, Food and Rural Affairs
  - Margaret Beckett, Secretary of State for Environment, Food and Rural Affairs (2001–2007)
- Secretary of State for Transport
  - Alistair Darling, Secretary of State for Transport (2002–2007)
- Secretary of State for Scotland
    1. Helen Liddell, Secretary of State for Scotland (2001–2003)
    2. Alistair Darling, Secretary of State for Scotland (2003–2007)
- Secretary of State for Health
    1. Alan Milburn, Secretary of State for Health (1999–2003)
    2. John Reid, Secretary of State for Health (2003–2007)
- Secretary of State for Northern Ireland
  - Paul Murphy, Secretary of State for Northern Ireland (2002–2007)
- Secretary of State for Defence
  - Geoff Hoon, Secretary of State for Defence (1999–2007)
- Secretary of State for Trade and Industry
  - Patricia Hewitt, Secretary of State for Trade and Industry (2001–2007)
- Minister for Women and Equality
  - Patricia Hewitt, Minister for Women and Equality (2001–2007)
- Secretary of State for Culture, Media and Sport
  - Tessa Jowell, Secretary of State for Culture, Media and Sport (2001–2007)
- Secretary of State for Education and Skills
  - Charles Clarke, Secretary of State for Education and Skills (2002–2007)
- Secretary of State for Wales
  - Peter Hain, Secretary of State for Wales (2002–2007)
- Lord Privy Seal
    1. Baron Williams of Mostyn, Lord Privy Seal (2001–2003)
    2. Peter Hain, Lord Privy Seal (2003–2007)
- Leader of the House of Commons
    1. Robin Cook, Leader of the House of Commons (2001–2003)
    2. John Reid, Leader of the House of Commons (2003)
    3. Peter Hain, Leader of the House of Commons (2003–2007)
- Lord President of the Council
    1. Robin Cook, Lord President of the Council (2001–2003)
    2. John Reid, Lord President of the Council (2003)
    3. Baron Williams of Mostyn, Lord President of the Council (2003)
    4. Baroness Amos, Lord President of the Council (2003–2007)
- Lord Chancellor
    1. Baron Irvine of Lairg, Lord Chancellor (1997–2003)
    2. Charles Falconer, Baron Falconer of Thoroton, Lord Chancellor (2003–2007)
- Secretary of State for Constitutional Affairs
    1. Charles Falconer, Baron Falconer of Thoroton, Lord Chancellor (2003–2007)
- Secretary of State for International Development
    1. Clare Short, Secretary of State for International Development (1997–2003)
    2. Baroness Amos, Secretary of State for International Development (2003)
    3. Hilary Benn, Secretary of State for International Development (2003–2007)
- Secretary of State for Work and Pensions
  - Andrew Smith, Secretary of State for Work and Pensions (2002–2004)
- Chancellor of the Duchy of Lancaster
    1. Lord Macdonald of Tradeston, Chancellor of the Duchy of Lancaster (2001–2003)
    2. Douglas Alexander, Chancellor of the Duchy of Lancaster (2003–2004)

== Devolved administrations ==
- First Minister of Scotland
  - Jack McConnell (2001–2007)
- Deputy First Minister of Scotland
  - Jim Wallace (1999–2005)
- First Minister of Wales
  - Rhodri Morgan (2000–2009)
- Deputy First Minister of Wales
  - Michael German (2002 – May 2003)

== Religion ==
- Archbishop of Canterbury
  - Rowan Williams, Archbishop of Canterbury (2003–2012)
- Archbishop of York
  - David Hope, Archbishop of York (1995–2005)

== Royalty ==
In order of precedence

- Prince consort
  - The Duke of Edinburgh (m. 1947)
- Heir apparent
  - The Prince of Wales (since 1958)
