= List of 2001 British incumbents =

This is a list of 2001 British incumbents.

== Government ==
- Monarch
  - Head of State – Elizabeth II, Queen of the United Kingdom (1952–2022)
- Prime Minister
  - Head of Government – Tony Blair, Prime Minister of the United Kingdom (1997–2007)
- Deputy Prime Minister
  - Deputy Head of Government – John Prescott, Deputy Prime Minister of the United Kingdom (1997–2007)
- First Secretary of State
  - John Prescott, First Secretary of State (1997–2007)
- First Lord of the Treasury
  - Tony Blair, First Lord of the Treasury (1997–2007)
- Minister for the Civil Service
  - Tony Blair, Minister for the Civil Service (1997–2007)
- Chancellor of the Exchequer
  - Gordon Brown, Chancellor of the Exchequer (1997–2007)
- Second Lord of the Treasury
  - Gordon Brown, Second Lord of the Treasury (1997–2007)
- Secretary of State for Foreign and Commonwealth Affairs
  1. Robin Cook, Secretary of State for Foreign and Commonwealth Affairs (1997–2001)
  2. Jack Straw, Secretary of State for Foreign and Commonwealth Affairs (2001–2007)
- Secretary of State for the Home Department
  1. Jack Straw, Secretary of State for the Home Department (1997–2001)
  2. David Blunkett, Secretary of State for the Home Department (2001–2007)
- Minister of Agriculture, Fisheries and Food
  - Nick Brown, Minister of Agriculture, Fisheries and Food (1998–2001)
  - Taken over by Secretary of State for Environment, Food and Rural Affairs
- Secretary of State for Environment, Food and Rural Affairs
  - Margaret Beckett, Secretary of State for Environment, Food and Rural Affairs (2001–2007)
- Secretary of State for Environment, Transport and the Regions
  1. John Prescott, Secretary of State for Environment, Transport and the Regions (1999–2001)
  2. Stephen Byers, Secretary of State for Transport (2001–2002)
- Secretary of State for Scotland
  1. John Reid, Secretary of State for Scotland (1999–2001)
  2. Helen Liddell, Secretary of State for Scotland (2001–2003)
- Secretary of State for Health
  - Alan Milburn, Secretary of State for Health (1999–2003)
- Secretary of State for Northern Ireland
  1. Peter Mandelson, Secretary of State for Northern Ireland (1999–2001)
  2. John Reid, Secretary of State for Northern Ireland (2001–2002)
- Secretary of State for Defence
  - Geoff Hoon, Secretary of State for Defence (1999–2007)
- Secretary of State for Trade and Industry
  1. Stephen Byers, Secretary of State for Trade and Industry (1998–2001)
  2. Patricia Hewitt, Secretary of State for Trade and Industry (2001–2007)
- Minister for Women and Equality
  - Patricia Hewitt, Minister for Women and Equality (2001–2007)
- Secretary of State for Culture, Media and Sport
  1. Chris Smith, Secretary of State for Culture, Media and Sport (1997–2001)
  2. Tessa Jowell, Secretary of State for Culture, Media and Sport (2001–2007)
  - Secretary of State for Education and Skills
  1. David Blunkett, Secretary of State for Education and Employment (1997–2001)
  2. Estelle Morris, Secretary of State for Education and Skills (2001–2007)
- Secretary of State for Wales
  - Paul Murphy, Secretary of State for Wales (1999–2002)
- Lord Privy Seal
  1. Margaret Jay, Baroness Jay of Paddington, Lord Privy Seal (1998–2001)
  2. Gareth Wyn Williams, Baron Williams of Mostyn, Lord Privy Seal (2001–2003)
- Leader of the House of Commons
  1. Margaret Beckett, Leader of the House of Commons (1998–2001)
  2. Robin Cook, Leader of the House of Commons (2001–2007)
- Lord President of the Council
  1. Margaret Beckett, Lord President of the Council (1998–2001)
  2. Robin Cook, Lord President of the Council (2001–2003)
- Lord Chancellor
  - Derry Irvine, Baron Irvine of Lairg, Lord Chancellor (1997–2003)
- Secretary of State for International Development
  - Clare Short, Secretary of State for International Development (1997–2003)
- Secretary of State for Work and Pensions
  1. Alistair Darling, Secretary of State for Social Security (1998–2001)
  2. Alistair Darling, Secretary of State for Work and Pensions (2001–2002)
- Chancellor of the Duchy of Lancaster
  1. Mo Mowlam, Chancellor of the Duchy of Lancaster (1999–2001)
  2. Lord Macdonald of Tradeston, Chancellor of the Duchy of Lancaster (2001–2003)

== Religion ==
- Archbishop of Canterbury
  - George Carey, Archbishop of Canterbury (1991–2002)
- Archbishop of York
  - David Hope, Archbishop of York (1995–2005)

== Devolved Administrations ==
- First Minister of Northern Ireland
  1. David Trimble (1998–2002)
  2. Reg Empey (acting July–November 2001)
- Deputy First Minister of Northern Ireland
  1. Seamus Mallon (1998-2001)
  2. Mark Durkan (2001-2002)
- First Minister of Scotland
  1. Henry McLeish (2000–2001)
  2. Jack McConnell (2001–2007)
- Deputy First Minister of Scotland
  - Jim Wallace (1999–2005)
- First Minister of Wales
  - Rhodri Morgan (2000–2009)
- Deputy First Minister of Wales
  1. Michael German (2000–2003)
  2. Jenny Randerson (acting July 2001–June 2002)
