= List of 2002 British incumbents =

This is a list of 2002 British incumbents.

== UK Government ==
- Monarch
  - Head of State – Elizabeth II, Queen of the United Kingdom (1952–2022)
- Prime Minister
  - Head of Government – Tony Blair, Prime Minister of the United Kingdom (1997–2007)
- Deputy Prime Minister
  - Deputy Head of Government – John Prescott, Deputy Prime Minister of the United Kingdom (1997–2007)
- First Secretary of State
  - John Prescott, First Secretary of State (1997–2007)
- First Lord of the Treasury
  - Tony Blair, First Lord of the Treasury (1997–2007)
- Minister for the Civil Service
  - Tony Blair, Minister for the Civil Service (1997–2007)
- Chancellor of the Exchequer
  - Gordon Brown, Chancellor of the Exchequer (1997–2007)
- Second Lord of the Treasury
  - Gordon Brown, Second Lord of the Treasury (1997–2007)
- Secretary of State for Foreign and Commonwealth Affairs
  - Jack Straw, Secretary of State for Foreign and Commonwealth Affairs (2001–2007)
- Secretary of State for the Home Department
  - David Blunkett, Secretary of State for the Home Department (2001–2007)
- Secretary of State for Environment, Food and Rural Affairs
  - Margaret Beckett, Secretary of State for Environment, Food and Rural Affairs (2001–2007)
- Secretary of State for Transport
    1. Stephen Byers, Secretary of State for Transport (2001–2002)
    2. Alistair Darling, Secretary of State for Transport (2002–2007)
- Secretary of State for Scotland
  - Helen Liddell, Secretary of State for Scotland (2001–2003)
- Secretary of State for Health
  - Alan Milburn, Secretary of State for Health (1999–2003)
- Secretary of State for Northern Ireland
    1. John Reid, Secretary of State for Northern Ireland (2001–2002)
    2. Paul Murphy, Secretary of State for Northern Ireland (2002–2007)
- Secretary of State for Defence
  - Geoff Hoon, Secretary of State for Defence (1999–2007)
- Secretary of State for Trade and Industry
  - Patricia Hewitt, Secretary of State for Trade and Industry (2001–2007)
- Minister for Women and Equality
  - Patricia Hewitt, Minister for Women and Equality (2001–2007)
- Secretary of State for Culture, Media and Sport
  - Tessa Jowell, Secretary of State for Culture, Media and Sport (2001–2007)
- Secretary of State for Education and Skills
    1. Estelle Morris, Secretary of State for Education and Skills (2001–2002)
    2. Charles Clarke, Secretary of State for Education and Skills (2002–2007)
- Secretary of State for Wales
    1. Paul Murphy, Secretary of State for Wales (1999–2002)
    2. Peter Hain, Secretary of State for Wales (2002–2007)
- Lord Privy Seal
  - Baron Williams of Mostyn, Lord Privy Seal (2001–2003)
- Leader of the House of Commons
  - Robin Cook, Leader of the House of Commons (2001–2003)
- Lord President of the Council
  - Robin Cook, Lord President of the Council (2001–2003)
- Lord Chancellor
  - Baron Irvine of Lairg, Lord Chancellor (1997–2003)
- Secretary of State for Constitutional Affairs
  - Baron Irvine of Lairg, Secretary of State for Constitutional Affairs (1997–2003)
- Secretary of State for International Development
  - Clare Short, Secretary of State for International Development (1997–2003)
- Secretary of State for Work and Pensions
  - Secretary of State for Work and Pensions –
    1. Alistair Darling, Secretary of State for Work and Pensions (2001–2002)
    2. Andrew Smith, Secretary of State for Work and Pensions (2002–2004)
- Chancellor of the Duchy of Lancaster
  - Lord Macdonald of Tradeston, Chancellor of the Duchy of Lancaster (2001–2003)

== Devolved Administrations ==
- First Minister of Scotland
  - Jack McConnell (2001–2007)
- Deputy First Minister of Scotland
  - Jim Wallace (1999–2005)
- First Minister of Wales
  - Rhodri Morgan (2000–2009)
- Deputy First Minister of Wales
    1. Jenny Randerson (acting 2001 – June 2002)
    2. Michael German (June 2002 – 2003)

== Religion ==
- Archbishop of Canterbury
  1. George Carey, Archbishop of Canterbury (1991–2002; retired 31 October 2002)
  2. Rowan Williams, Archbishop-elect of Canterbury (2003–2012)
- Archbishop of York
  - David Hope, Archbishop of York (1995–2005)

== Royalty ==
In order of precedence

- Prince consort
  - The Duke of Edinburgh (m. 1947)
- Heir apparent
  - The Prince of Wales (since 1958)
