= Monklandsgate =

Map of the Monklands District, within Scotland.

Monklandsgate was the name of a political scandal in the former Scottish local government district of Monklands (now part of North Lanarkshire) which dominated the Monklands East by-election in 1994.

Monklandsgate consisted of allegations of sectarian spending discrepancies between Protestant Airdrie and Catholic Coatbridge, fuelled by the fact that all 17 of the ruling Labour group were Roman Catholics.

Accusations included: £21M spent on capital projects in Coatbridge while only £2M was spent in Airdrie; councillors handing out green job application forms while the job centre handed out white ones; and also accusations of nepotism as dozens of council workers were related to Labour councillors. The accusations were of increased interest to the media as the Monklands West MP was Tom Clarke, former Monklands District Provost and one time Shadow Secretary of State for Scotland, while the Monklands East MP was the Labour leader, John Smith. The allegations of sectarianism were never proven. However, allegations of nepotism were found to be true.

Despite the allegations, Helen Liddell narrowly retained the seat for Labour, against a strong swing to Kay Ullrich of the Scottish National Party.
