= List of 2000 British incumbents =

This is a list of 2000 British incumbents.

== Government ==
- Monarch
  - Head of State – Elizabeth II, Queen of the United Kingdom (1952–2007)
- Prime Minister
  - Head of Government – Tony Blair, Prime Minister of the United Kingdom (1997–2007)
- Deputy Prime Minister
  - Deputy Head of Government – John Prescott, Deputy Prime Minister of the United Kingdom (1997–2007)
- First Secretary of State
  - John Prescott, First Secretary of State (1997–2007)
- First Lord of the Treasury
  - Tony Blair, First Lord of the Treasury (1997–2007)
- Minister for the Civil Service
  - Tony Blair, Minister for the Civil Service (1997–2007)
- Chancellor of the Exchequer
  - Gordon Brown, Chancellor of the Exchequer (1997–2007)
- Second Lord of the Treasury
  - Gordon Brown, Second Lord of the Treasury (1997–2007)
- Secretary of State for Foreign and Commonwealth Affairs
  - Robin Cook, Secretary of State for Foreign and Commonwealth Affairs (1997–2001)
- Secretary of State for the Home Department
  - Jack Straw, Secretary of State for the Home Department (1997–2001)
- Minister of Agriculture, Fisheries and Food
  - Nick Brown, Minister of Agriculture, Fisheries and Food (1998–2001)
- Secretary of State for Environment, Transport and the Regions
  - Lord Macdonald of Tradeston, Secretary of State for Environment, Transport and the Regions (1999–2001)
- Secretary of State for Scotland
  - John Reid, Secretary of State for Scotland (1999–2001)
- Secretary of State for Health
  - Alan Milburn, Secretary of State for Health (1999–2003)
- Secretary of State for Northern Ireland
  - Peter Mandelson, Secretary of State for Northern Ireland (1999–2001)
- Secretary of State for Defence
  - Geoff Hoon, Secretary of State for Defence (1999–2007)
- Secretary of State for Trade and Industry
  - Stephen Byers, Secretary of State for Trade and Industry (1998–2001)
- Minister for Women and Equality
  - Patricia Hewitt, Minister for Women and Equality (2001–2007)
- Secretary of State for Culture, Media and Sport
  - Chris Smith, Secretary of State for Culture, Media and Sport (1997–2001)
- Secretary of State for Education and Employment
  - David Blunkett, Secretary of State for Education and Employment (1997–2001)
- Secretary of State for Wales
  - Paul Murphy, Secretary of State for Wales (1999–2002)
- Lord Privy Seal
  - Margaret Jay, Baroness Jay of Paddington, Lord Privy Seal (1998–2001)
- Leader of the House of Commons
  - Margaret Beckett, Leader of the House of Commons (1998–2001)
- Lord President of the Council
  - Margaret Beckett, Lord President of the Council (1998–2001)
- Lord Chancellor
  - Derry Irvine, Baron Irvine of Lairg, Lord Chancellor (1997–2003)
- Secretary of State for International Development
  - Clare Short, Secretary of State for International Development (1997–2003)
- Secretary of State for Social Security
  - Alistair Darling, Secretary of State for Social Security (1998–2001)
- Chancellor of the Duchy of Lancaster
  - Mo Mowlam, Chancellor of the Duchy of Lancaster (1999–2001)

== Religion ==
- Archbishop of Canterbury
  - George Carey, Archbishop of Canterbury (1991–2002)
- Archbishop of York
  - David Hope, Archbishop of York (1995–2005)
