= Monklands East =

UK Parliament constituency (1983–1997)

- Former burgh constituency for the House of Commons
- Subdivision: Monklands

1983–1997
- Seats: One
- Created from: Bothwell, Coatbridge and Airdrie and North Lanarkshire
- Replaced by: Airdrie & Shotts and Coatbridge and Chryston

Monklands East was a constituency represented in the House of Commons of the Parliament of the United Kingdom from 1983 until 1997. It elected one Member of Parliament (MP) by the first-past-the-post voting system. For the 1997 general election, it was replaced in part by Airdrie and Shotts.

It was previously held by the former Leader of the Opposition John Smith.

== Boundaries ==
The Monklands District electoral divisions of Airdrie East, Airdrie South and West, and Chapelhall and Salsburgh.

The constituency included the town of Airdrie and a substantial part of eastern Coatbridge (Carnbroe, Shawhead, Whifflet, Greenend, Sikeside, Coatdyke, Cliftonville) together with villages such as Chapelhall, Calderbank, Plains, Caldercruix, and Greengairs.

== Members of Parliament ==
Election	Member	Party	Notes
1983	Rt Hon John Smith	Labour	Previously MP for Lanarkshire North from 1970. Shadow Chancellor of the Exchequer 1987−1992. Leader of the Labour Party & Leader of the Opposition 1992−1994. Died 1994.
1994 by-election	Helen Liddell	Labour	Subsequently, MP for Airdrie and Shotts from 1997.
1997	constituency abolished: see Airdrie and Shotts		

== Election results ==
=== Elections of the 1980s ===
General election 1983: Monklands East
Party	Candidate	Votes	%	±%
Labour	John Smith	18,358	51.2	−8.9
Conservative	John Love	8,559	23.9	−1.0
Liberal	Alan Rennie	5,721	16.0	
SNP	Thomas Johnston	3,185	8.9	−6.2
Majority		9,799	27.4	−7.9
Turnout		35,823	73.1	
Labour win (new seat)				

General election 1987: Monklands East
Party	Candidate	Votes	%	±%
Labour	John Smith	22,649	61.0	+9.8
Conservative	John Love	6,260	16.9	−7.0
SNP	Kenneth Gibson	4,790	12.9	+4.0
Liberal	Sandra Grieve	3,442	9.3	−6.7
Majority		16,389	44.1	+16.7
Turnout		37,141	74.8	+1.7
Labour hold		Swing	+8.4	

=== Elections of the 1990s ===
General election 1992: Monklands East
Party	Candidate	Votes	%	±%
Labour	John Smith	22,266	61.3	+0.3
SNP	Jim Wright	6,554	18.0	+5.1
Conservative	Stewart Walters	5,830	16.1	−0.8
Liberal Democrats	Philip W. Ross	1,679	4.6	−4.7
Majority		15,712	43.3	−0.8
Turnout		36,329	75.0	+0.2
Labour hold		Swing	-2.4	

By-election 1994: Monklands East
Party	Candidate	Votes	%	±%
Labour	Helen Liddell	16,950	49.8	−11.5
SNP	Kay Ullrich	15,320	44.9	+26.9
Liberal Democrats	Stephen Gallagher	878	2.6	−2.0
Conservative	Susan Bell	799	2.3	−13.8
Independent	Abi Bremner	69	0.2	New
Natural Law	Duncan Patterson	58	0.2	New
Majority		1,640	4.9	−42.4
Turnout		34,074	70.0	−5.0
Labour hold		Swing	-19.2	

Parliament of the United Kingdom
Preceded by Islwyn	Constituency represented by the leader of the opposition 1992 – 1994	Succeeded by Derby South
