= 1994 Monklands East by-election =

UK parliamentary by-election

- 30 June 1994

Constituency of Monklands East
- Turnout: 70.0% ▼5.0%
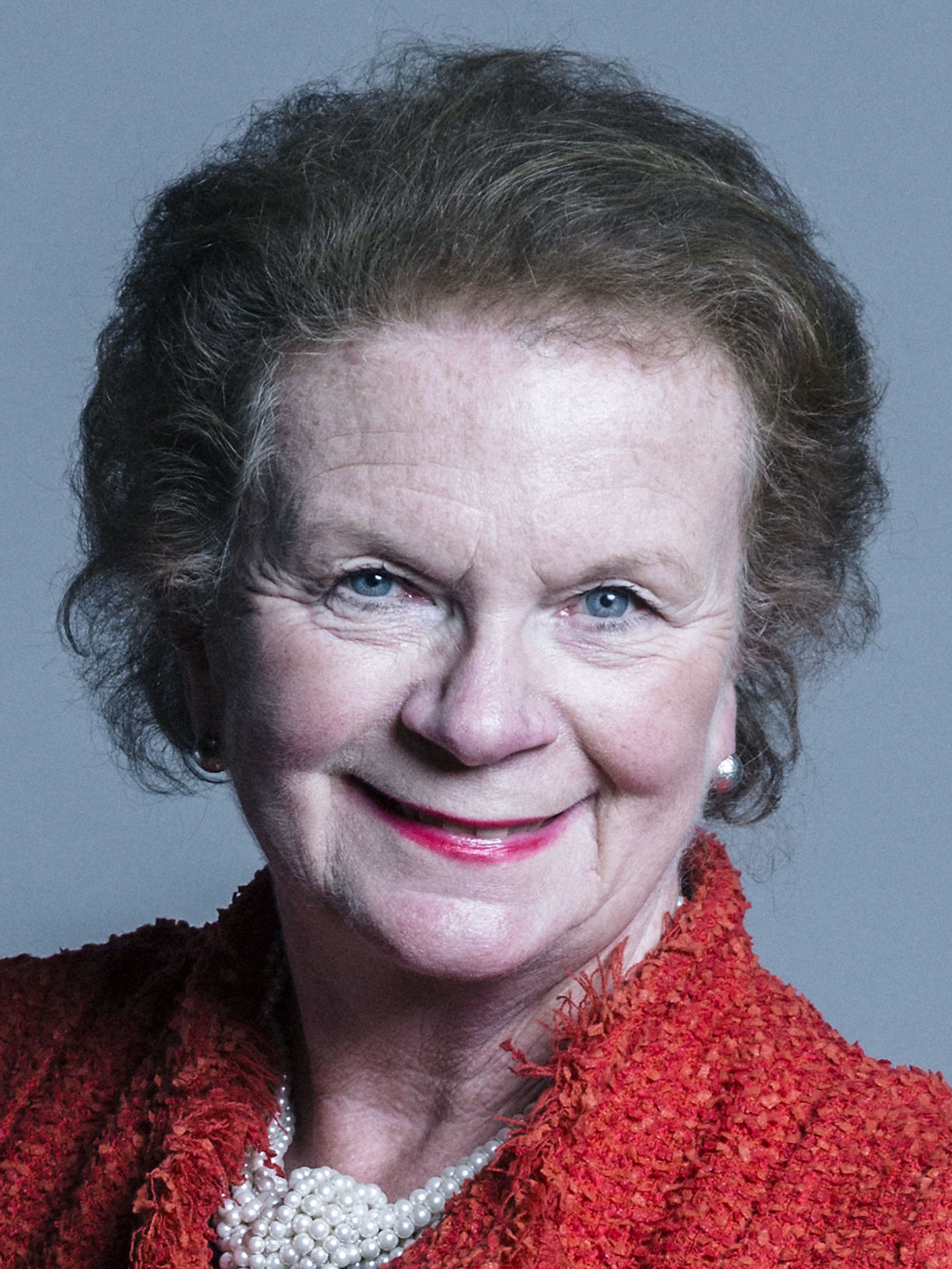

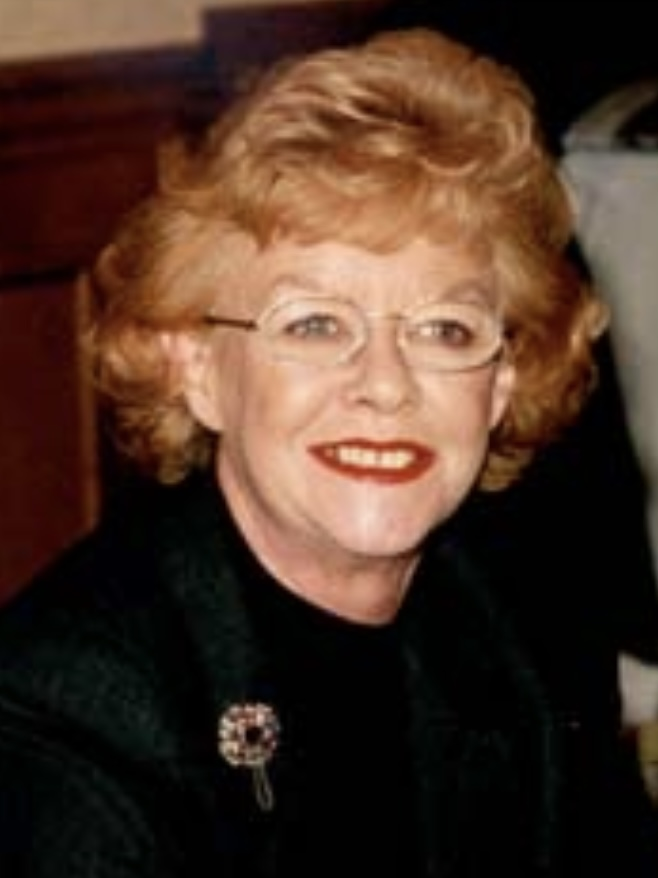
	First party	Second party
Candidate	Helen Liddell	Kay Ullrich
Party	Labour	SNP
Popular vote	16,950	15,320
Percentage	49.8%	44.9%
Swing	▼11.5%	▲26.9%
MP before election
John Smith
Labour
Elected MP
Helen Liddell
Labour

The 1994 Monklands East by-election was held on 30 June 1994, following the death of the Leader of the Labour Party John Smith, Member of Parliament (MP) for Monklands East in Scotland, on 12 May.

Monklands East was considered a safe Labour seat; John Smith had held it since its creation in 1983, and had previously held the predecessor seat of North Lanarkshire, which had been held by Labour since the 1945 general election. In the 1992 general election, Smith had won more than 60% of the vote in the constituency, with most of the remaining votes split fairly evenly between the Scottish National Party and the Conservative Party.

== Candidates ==
For the by-election, Labour selected Helen Liddell. She was a high-profile candidate, who had been the first female general secretary of the Labour Party at only 26, and had been an aide to disgraced media tycoon Robert Maxwell until his death.

The Scottish National Party (SNP) selected Kay Ullrich, who had previously contested Cunninghame South and Motherwell South.

Despite achieving a reasonable third place in 1992, the Conservatives expected little from the election. The Conservative government was becoming increasingly unpopular. The party stood Susan Bell, whose husband Arthur Bell was the leader of the Tory Reform Group.

The Liberal Democrats were particularly weak in the area, narrowly losing their deposit in 1992 in their eighth-worst performance nationally. They ran a low-profile campaign and stood Stephen Gallagher, a former President of Glasgow University Union.

Two other candidates stood; Abi Bremner on a platform opposing the Criminal Justice and Public Order Bill, and Duncan Patterson of the Natural Law Party.

== Campaign ==
The main issue of the campaign was allegations of sectarian bias on Monklands District Council, which included the constituency (see Monklandsgate). It was alleged that the council, controlled by Labour members, had favoured spending in Coatbridge, a predominantly Roman Catholic area, over Airdrie, a mostly Protestant area; and that councillors had unfairly influenced council employment policies. Proponents of the allegations of sectarianism noted that all seventeen Labour councillors were Catholics. Nicholas Wood of The Times said it was "one of the dirtiest by-election campaigns of recent times". On the night of the electoral count, Liddell was spat upon and called "scum" and a "Fenian bastard". In her victory speech Liddell claimed the SNP had "played the Orange card", something which Alex Salmond strenuously denied.

Both Liddell and Ullrich wished to avoid focusing on the allegations. Liddell initially supported the council, but towards the end of the campaign, she became critical of it. Her criticisms were strongly opposed by Tom Clarke, Labour MP for Monklands West and former Provost of Monklands Council.

== Result ==
The controversy boosted support for the SNP, and by the day of the election, Labour were not certain of holding the seat. Liddell held on to win, but with a much reduced majority of only 1,640. The SNP took a close second, while the Lib Dems fell back even from their weak position to again lose their deposit, and the Conservatives also lost their deposit, as they saw a dramatic loss of support move them into fourth place, with only 799 votes. Despite a run of disappointing by-election results, this was the first time since the 1991 Liverpool Walton by-election that the Conservatives had failed to take one of the top three places in a by-election.

At the 1997 general election, the constituency was abolished, most of it being replaced by Airdrie and Shotts. Liddell stood for the new seat and held it with a comfortable majority. Ullrich became a Member of the Scottish Parliament for West of Scotland from 1999 to 2003, while Bell later left the Conservative Party for the Liberal Democrats.

Monklands East by-election, 1994
Party	Candidate	Votes	%	±%
Labour	Helen Liddell	16,950	49.8	−11.5
SNP	Kay Ullrich	15,320	44.9	+26.9
Liberal Democrats	Stephen Gallagher	878	2.6	−2.0
Conservative	Susan Bell	799	2.3	−13.7
Independent	Abi Bremner	69	0.2	New
Natural Law	Duncan Patterson	58	0.2	New
Majority		1,640	4.9	−42.4
Turnout		34,074	70.0	−5.0
Labour hold		Swing	-19.2	

== Previous result ==
General election 1992: Monklands East
Party	Candidate	Votes	%	±%
Labour	John Smith	22,266	61.3	+0.3
SNP	Jim Wright	6,554	18.0	+5.1
Conservative	Stewart Walters	5,830	16.1	−6.8
Liberal Democrats	Phillip W. Ross	1,679	4.6	−4.8
Majority		15,712	43.3	−0.9
Turnout		36,329	75.0	+0.2
Labour hold		Swing	-2.4	

== See also ==
- List of United Kingdom by-elections (1979–2010)
