= Secretary of State for the Environment, Transport and the Regions =

Defunct UK Cabinet ministerial position

Department for the Environment, Transport and the Regions

Department overview
- Formed: 3 May 1997
- Preceding agencies: Department of the Environment; Department for Transport
- Dissolved: 8 June 2001
- Superseding agencies: Department for Environment, Food and Rural Affairs; Department for Transport, Local Government and the Regions
- Jurisdiction: United Kingdom
- Headquarters: London, England, UK

The Secretary of State for the Environment, Transport and the Regions was a United Kingdom Cabinet position created in 1997, with responsibility for the Department of the Environment, Transport and the Regions (DETR). The position and department were created for John Prescott by merging the positions and responsibilities of the Secretary of State for Environment, the Secretary of State for Transport and some other functions.

Frank Dobson, who had been Shadow Secretary of State for the Environment prior to the 1997 general election, was made Secretary of State for Health, while Andrew Smith, who had been Shadow Secretary of State for Transport, was made a junior minister at the Department for Education and Employment.

Michael Meacher, who had been Shadow Minister for Environmental Protection within the Shadow Cabinet, was given the non-cabinet position of Minister of State for the Environment, and attended cabinet meetings where the Environment was discussed, and a position of Minister of State for Transport was similarly created, initially held by Gavin Strang.

In June 2001, the department was renamed the Department for Transport, Local Government and the Regions (DTLR), with the Environment portfolio being merged with the Ministry of Agriculture, Fisheries and Food into the Department of Environment, Food and Rural Affairs. All departments were given their own Secretaries of State. In May 2002, the Local Government and the Regions portfolios were separated from Transport and given to the Office of the Deputy Prime Minister, which in turn became the Department for Communities and Local Government in May 2006.

== Transport ==
From 1997 to 2001, the Ministers of State with responsibility for Transport were:

- Gavin Strang (3 May 1997 – 27 July 1998)
- John Reid (27 July 1998 – 17 May 1999)
- Helen Liddell (17 May 1999 – 29 July 1999)
- Gus Macdonald, Baron Macdonald of Tradeston (29 July 1999 – 8 June 2001)

John Reid and Gus Macdonald attended cabinet meetings, but was not formally a member of the cabinet, whereas Gavin Strang was given a seat in the cabinet when he held the position.

== Environment ==
Ministers of State with responsibility for the Environment included:

- Michael Meacher (1997–2001)
- Richard Caborn (1997–1999)
- Nick Raynsford (1999–2001)

== Local government ==
Hilary Armstrong was Minister of State with responsibility for Local Government (1997–2001).
