= Minister of State for Transport =

British government ministerial position

United Kingdom Minister of State for Rail
- Royal Arms of His Majesty's Government

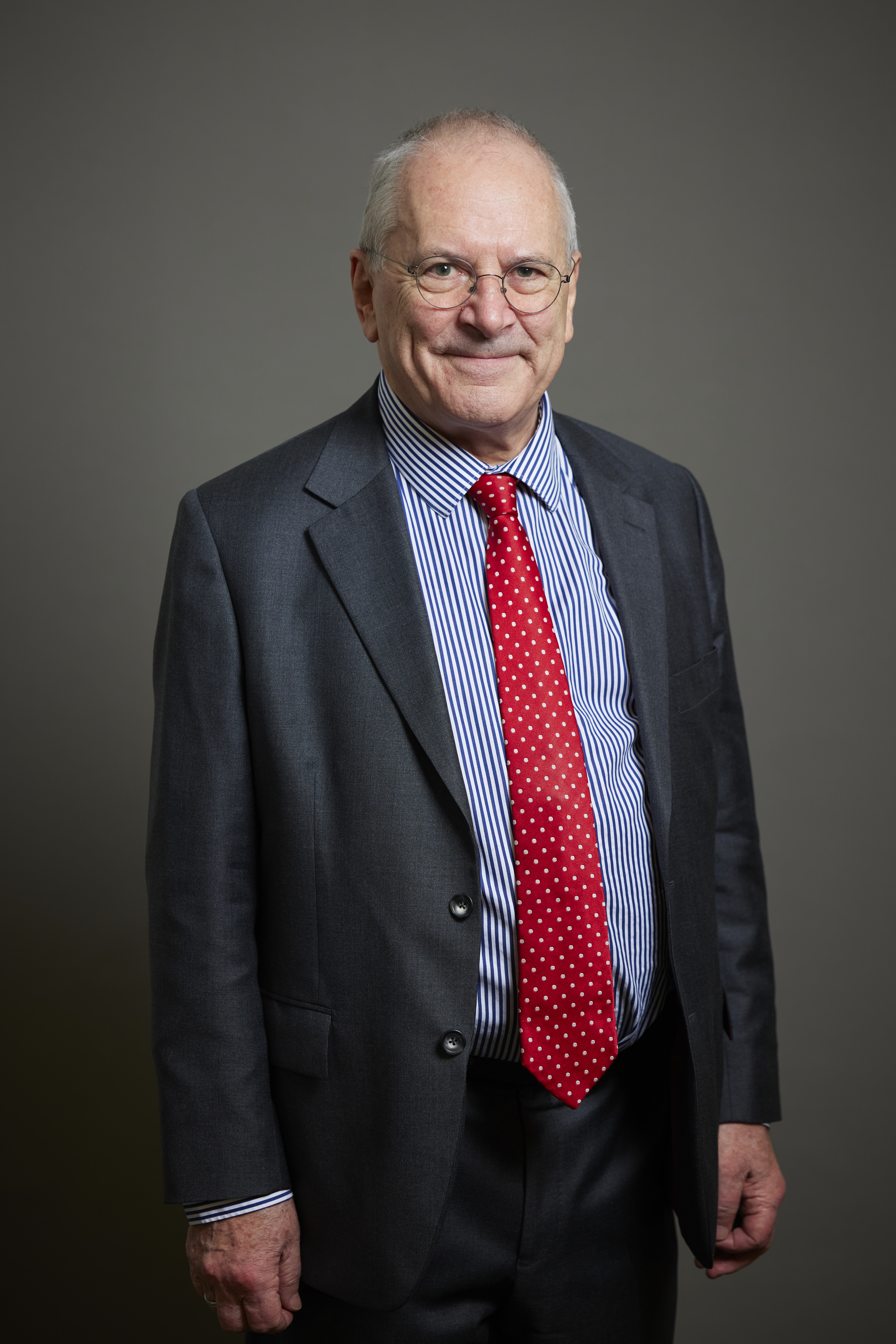
- Incumbent; Peter Hendy, Baron Hendy of Richmond Hill since 8 July 2024
- Department for Transport
- Style: Minister
- Reports to: Secretary of State for Transport
- Nominator: Prime Minister of the United Kingdom
- Appointer: The King; (on advice of the Prime Minister)
- Term length: At His Majesty's pleasure
- First holder: Lynda Chalker

The Minister of State for Rail is a mid-level ministerial position in the Department for Transport of the Government of the United Kingdom. The minister is deputy to the Secretary of State for Transport.

== Ministers of State ==
Name (Cabinet status)	Portrait	Term of office		Political party	P.M.	Transp.Sec.
Minister of State for Transport
Lynda Chalker		18 October 1983	10 January 1986	Conservative	Thatcher	Ridley; Moore; Channon; Parkinson
David Mitchell		23 January 1986	25 July 1988	Conservative	Thatcher	Ridley; Moore; Channon; Parkinson
Michael Portillo		25 July 1988	4 May 1990	Conservative	Thatcher	Ridley; Moore; Channon; Parkinson
Roger Freeman		4 May 1990	20 July 1994	Conservative	Thatcher	Ridley; Moore; Channon; Parkinson
Ivon Moore-Brabazon, 3rd Baron Brabazon of Tara		23 July 1990	14 April 1992	Conservative	Thatcher	Ridley; Moore; Channon; Parkinson
Malcolm Sinclair, 20th Earl of Caithness		14 April 1992	11 January 1994	Conservative	Major	Rifkind; MacGregor; Mawhinney; Young
John Watts		20 July 1994	2 May 1997	Conservative	Major	Rifkind; MacGregor; Mawhinney; Young
Gavin Strang (in Cabinet)		2 May 1997	18 June 1998	Labour	Blair	Prescott (DPM, SSETR)
John Reid (attended Cabinet)		27 July 1998	17 May 1999	Labour	Blair	Prescott (DPM, SSETR)
Helen Liddell		17 May 1999	29 July 1999	Labour	Blair	Prescott (DPM, SSETR)
Gus Macdonald, Baron Macdonald of Tradeston (attended Cabinet)		29 July 1999	8 June 2001	Labour	Blair	Prescott (DPM, SSETR)
John Spellar (attended Cabinet)		8 June 2001	12 June 2003	Labour	Blair	Byers (SSTLR)
John Spellar (attended Cabinet)		8 June 2001	12 June 2003	Labour	Blair	Darling
Kim Howells		12 June 2003	10 September 2004	Labour	Blair	Darling
Tony McNulty		10 September 2004	9 May 2005	Labour	Blair	Darling
Stephen Ladyman		9 May 2005	28 June 2007	Labour	Blair	Darling
Stephen Ladyman		9 May 2005	28 June 2007	Labour	Blair	Alexander
Rosie Winterton		28 June 2007	3 October 2008	Labour	Brown	Kelly
Andrew Adonis, Baron Adonis		3 October 2008	5 June 2009	Labour	Brown	Hoon
Sadiq Khan (attended Cabinet when his responsibilities were on the agenda)		9 June 2009	11 May 2010	Labour	Brown	Adonis
Theresa Villiers		12 May 2010	4 September 2012	Conservative	Cameron	Hammond; Greening
Simon Burns		5 September 2012	5 October 2013	Conservative	Cameron	McLoughlin
Susan Kramer, Baroness Kramer		5 October 2013	8 May 2015	Liberal Democrats	Cameron	McLoughlin
John Hayes		15 July 2014	11 May 2015	Conservative	Cameron	McLoughlin
Robert Goodwill		11 May 2015	16 July 2016	Conservative	Cameron	McLoughlin
John Hayes		16 July 2016	9 January 2018	Conservative	May	Grayling
Jo Johnson		9 January 2018	9 November 2018	Conservative	May	Grayling
Jesse Norman		12 November 2018	23 May 2019	Conservative	May	Grayling
Michael Ellis		23 May 2019	24 July 2019	Conservative	May	Grayling
George Freeman		26 July 2019	13 February 2020	Conservative	Johnson	Shapps
Chris Heaton-Harris		25 July 2019	19 December 2021	Conservative	Johnson	Shapps
Andrew Stephenson		13 February 2020	7 July 2022	Conservative	Johnson	Shapps
Wendy Morton (Note: Parliamentary Under-Secretary of State until February 2022)		19 December 2021	6 September 2022	Conservative	Johnson	Shapps
Trudy Harrison (Note: Parliamentary Under-Secretary of State until July 2022)		7 July 2022	7 September 2022	Conservative	Johnson	Shapps
Kevin Foster		7 September 2022	26 October 2022	Conservative	Truss	Trevelyan
Lucy Frazer		8 September 2022	26 October 2022	Conservative	Truss	Trevelyan
Minister of State for Decarbonisation and Technology
Jesse Norman		26 October 2022	13 November 2023	Conservative	Sunak	Harper
Minister of State for Rail and HS2
Huw Merriman		27 October 2022	5 July 2024	Conservative	Sunak	Harper
Minister of State for Rail
Peter Hendy, Baron Hendy of Richmond Hill		8 July 2024	Incumbent	Labour	Starmer; Burnham	Haigh; Alexander
