= Kay Ullrich =

Scottish politician (1943–2021)

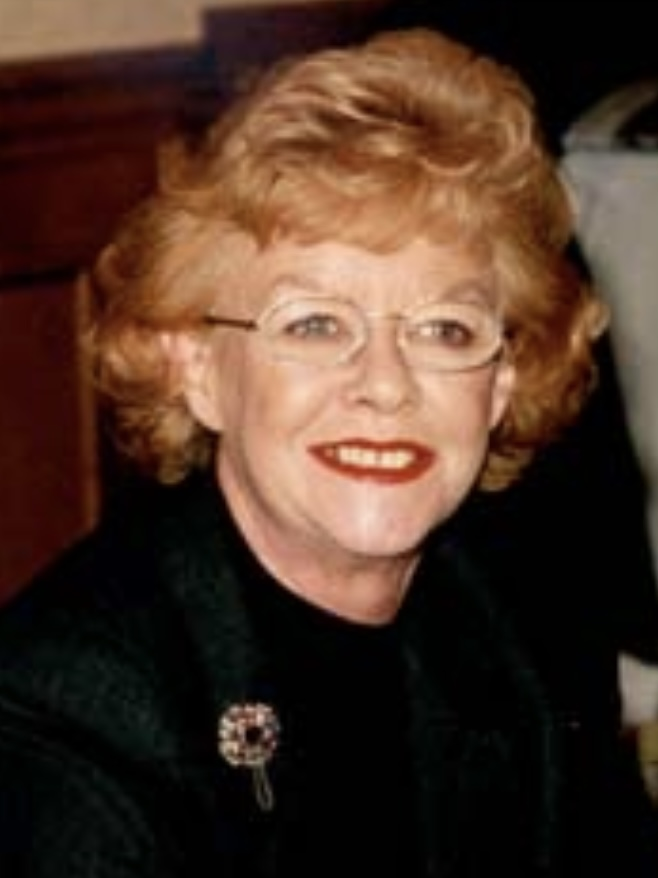

Member of the Scottish Parliament for West of Scotland (1 of 7 Regional MSPs)
- In office 6 May 1999 – 31 March 2003

Personal details
- Born: Catherine Mario Morrison; 5 May 1943 Prestwick, Scotland
- Died: 4 January 2021 (aged 77) Irvine, Scotland
- Party: Scottish National Party
- Spouse: Grady Ullrich (m. 1976)
- Education: Queen's College
- Occupation: Politician, social worker

Catherine Mario Ullrich (née Morrison; 5 May 1943 – 4 January 2021) was a Scottish politician who was a Member of the Scottish Parliament (MSP) for the West of Scotland region from 1999 to 2003. A prominent member of the Scottish National Party (SNP), she was an early supporter of the political career of Nicola Sturgeon, who later became First Minister of Scotland.

== Early life ==
Catherine Mario Morrison was born on 5 May 1943 in Prestwick as the only child of Jack Dallas Morrison and Charlotte Morrison (née Neil). Her father was a member of the Scottish Unionist Party. She was educated at Ayr Academy, before gaining a Certificate of Qualification in Social Work at Queen's College in Glasgow.

In 1965, Ullrich joined the Scottish National Party (SNP), having felt anger at Polaris nuclear missiles being stationed on the Clyde, and campaigned for Scottish independence all her life. She was a school swimming instructor from 1973 to 1982 and then worked as a school, hospital and court social worker from 1984 to 1997. She took early retirement from social work in 1997.

== Political career ==
Ullrich stood unsuccessfully as an SNP candidate at several general elections: Cunninghame South (Both at the 1983 and 1987 UK general elections) and Motherwell South at the 1992 general election with Andrew Wilson as her election agent. The sudden death of Labour Leader John Smith in May 1994 triggered the Monklands East by-election, where Ullrich also stood as an SNP candidate. She reduced Labour's majority at the election, but was defeated by Labour's candidate Helen Liddell.

At the 1999 Scottish Parliament election, Ullrich stood as a constituency candidate in Cunninghame North, where she was runner-up to Allan Wilson. However, as she had been placed second on the SNP's West of Scotland list, she was able to enter Parliament as a regional list Member. By November, squabbles between Wilson and her around who might represent a constituent led to the deputy presiding officer George Reid stepping in to work towards clarifying the roles of constituency and regional list Members. The "Reid Principles" were set out, incorporated into the Members of Scottish Parliament code of conduct and endorsed by Parliament.

During her time in Parliament, Ullrich served as deputy convener of the Equal Opportunities Committee (2000–03) and convener of the Commissioner for Children and Young People (Scotland) Bill committee (January–March 2003). She was also a member of the Health and Community Care Committee (1999–2003) and the Procedures Committee (2000–01). On 26 May 1999, Leader of the Opposition Alex Salmond announced Ullrich as the Shadow Minister for health and Community Care. The following year, future First Minister John Swinney replaced Salmond as SNP leader and days later, on 26 September 2000, she was appointed Chief Whip, a role which she held until the dissolution of parliament. She stood down at the 2003 election. After her parliamentary career, she worked as a safeguarder with the Children's Panel. In 2005, following the retirement of Winnie Ewing, Ullrich stood for the position of SNP President, losing to Ian Hudghton.

In 1987, sixteen-year-old Nicola Sturgeon approached Ullrich to work on her general election campaign. Ullrich later supported Sturgeon when she stood for selection as a candidate in Glasgow Shettleston in 1992, stating "This lady here will be the first female leader of the SNP one day". Sturgeon acknowledged Ullrich as a mentor, and Ullrich was present at the Scottish Parliament as a guest when Sturgeon became Scotland's first female First Minister in November 2014.

Ullrich was a member of UNISON.

=== Recognition ===
Ullrich was presented, posthumously, (received by her widower and granddaughter) with the SNP President's Prize by Michael Russell at the SNP party conference in November 2021, in recognition of her "exceptional active commitment to the SNP and Scottish Independence". The conference was held virtually due the restrictions imposed as a result of the ongoing COVID-19 pandemic. The award was initiated by Winnie Ewing. Ms Sturgeon, in acknowledging Ullrich's deserved award for her contribution said that ' I wouldn't be standing here today as First Minister of Scotland without the influence, the support, the mentoring of over decades of Kay Ullrich'.

== Personal life ==
Ullrich married and had two children; one son and one daughter, journalist Shelley Jofre. She died on 4 January 2021 at the age of 77.
