= Gareth Williams, Baron Williams of Mostyn =

British Labour Party politician (1941–2003)

The Right Honourable The Lord Williams of Mostyn PC QC

Leader of the House of Lords
- In office 8 June 2001 – 20 September 2003
- Prime Minister: Tony Blair
- Preceded by: The Baroness Jay of Paddington
- Succeeded by: The Baroness Amos
Other ministerial offices 1999–2003
Lord President of the Council
In office 13 June 2003 – 20 September 2003
Prime Minister	Tony Blair
Preceded by	John Reid
Succeeded by	The Baroness Amos
Lord Keeper of the Privy Seal
In office 8 June 2001 – 13 June 2003
Prime Minister	Tony Blair
Preceded by	The Baroness Jay of Paddington
Succeeded by	Peter Hain
Attorney General for England and Wales Attorney General for Northern Ireland
In office 29 July 1999 – 8 June 2001
Prime Minister	Tony Blair
Preceded by	John Morris
Succeeded by	The Lord Goldsmith
Junior ministerial offices 1997–2001
Deputy Leader of the House of Lords
In office October 1998 – June 2001
Prime Minister	Tony Blair
Leader	The Baroness Jay of Paddington
Preceded by	The Baroness Jay of Paddington
Succeeded by	The Baroness Symons of Vernham Dean
Minister of State for Prisons
In office 28 July 1998 – 28 July 1999
Prime Minister	Tony Blair
Preceded by	Joyce Quin
Succeeded by	Charles Clarke
Parliamentary Under-Secretary of State for Home Affairs
In office 2 May 1997 – 28 July 1998
Prime Minister	Tony Blair
Preceded by	Tom Sackville
Succeeded by	Kate Hoey

Member of the House of Lords
- Lord Temporal
- Life peerage 30 July 1992 – 20 September 2003

Personal details
- Born: 5 February 1941 Prestatyn, Wales
- Died: 20 September 2003 (aged 62) Evenlode, England
- Resting place: St Michael and all Angels Church; Great Tew, England
- Party: Labour
- Spouses: Pauline Clarke (m. 1962, divorced); Veena Russell (m. 1994)
- Children: 4
- Education: Queens' College, Cambridge

Gareth Wyn Williams, Baron Williams of Mostyn, PC, QC (5 February 1941 – 20 September 2003) was a Welsh barrister and Labour politician who was Leader of the House of Lords, Lord President of the Council and a member of the Cabinet from 2001 until his sudden death in 2003. He played an important role in the Northern Ireland peace process.

== Early life ==
Williams was born near Prestatyn, in North Wales, a son of Albert Thomas Williams and his wife Selina, née Evans. He was educated at Rhyl Grammar School and at Queens' College, Cambridge.

== Legal career ==
He was called to the bar at Gray's Inn in 1965, he became Queen's Counsel in 1978, was a Recorder from 1978, a Deputy High Court Judge, 1986–92, the Leader of the Wales and Chester Circuit, 1987–89, and a Member of the Bar Council, 1986–92 (Chairman, 1992).

== Political career ==
He was created a life peer on 20 July 1992 as Baron Williams of Mostyn, of Great Tew in the County of Oxfordshire, and became an opposition spokesman in the House of Lords on Legal Affairs and later Northern Ireland. After Labour's election victory he was appointed a Home Office minister and played a role in securing the permanent Provisional IRA ceasefire of 1997 during the Northern Ireland peace process. In 1999 he became Attorney General for England and Wales and Northern Ireland. He was appointed Leader of the House of Lords in 2001, initially with the sinecure office of Lord Privy Seal, for which Lord President of the Council was substituted in 2003.

== Reputation among his colleagues ==
As part of the celebrations to mark the fiftieth anniversary of the Life Peerages Act, Lord Williams was voted by the current members of the House of Lords as the outstanding life peer since the creation of the life peerage. In his book A View from the Foothills Chris Mullin wrote that he thought that Gareth Williams was most likely to succeed Derry Irvine as Lord Chancellor; in the event the position was next filled by Charles Falconer.

== Personal life ==
Williams married Pauline Clarke in 1962, and they had three children. They divorced, and he then married Veena M. Russell in 1994, and by her had one daughter, Imogen. He died from a heart attack at his home in Evenlode, Gloucestershire on 20 September 2003, aged 62, and was buried at St Michael and all Angels Church in Great Tew, Oxfordshire.

== Arms ==
Coat of arms of Gareth Williams, Baron Williams of Mostyn
Crest A portcullis Or in front of an arm embowed vested and the cuff braided Sable frilled at the wrist the hand Proper holding by its blade upwards Argent a sword palewise to the front of the portcullis its hilt pommel and quillons Gold. Escutcheon Ermine on a pile flory at the point Sable a lion rampany Or armed and langued Gules. Supporters Dexter upon a grassy mount growing therefrom two sweet pea flowers Proper a griffin statant erect Gold sinister upon a like mount a dragon statant erect also Gold both armed and langued Gules. Motto Y Gwir Yn Erbyn Y Byd

== Bibliography ==
- Burke's Peerage & Baronetage (106th edition, 1999) edited by Charles Mosley

Political offices
Preceded by The Baroness Jay of Paddington	Deputy Leader of the House of Lords; 1998–2001	Succeeded by The Baroness Symons of Vernham Dean
Preceded by John Morris	Attorney General for England and Wales; 1999–2001	Succeeded by The Lord Goldsmith
Preceded by John Morris	Attorney General for Northern Ireland; 1999–2001	Succeeded by The Lord Goldsmith
Preceded by The Baroness Jay of Paddington	Lord Privy Seal; 2001–2003	Succeeded by Peter Hain
Preceded by The Baroness Jay of Paddington	Leader of the House of Lords; 2001–2003	Succeeded by The Baroness Amos
Preceded by John Reid	Lord President of the Council; 2003	Succeeded by The Baroness Amos
Party political offices
Preceded by The Baroness Jay of Paddington	Leader of the Labour Party in the House of Lords; 2001–2003	Succeeded by The Baroness Amos
Academic offices
Preceded by Cledwyn Hughes	Pro-Chancellor of the University of Wales; 1994–2003	Succeeded by Dafydd Wigley
