= Gus Macdonald =

Scottish television executive, life peer (born 1940)

The Right Honourable The Lord Macdonald of Tradeston CBE PC
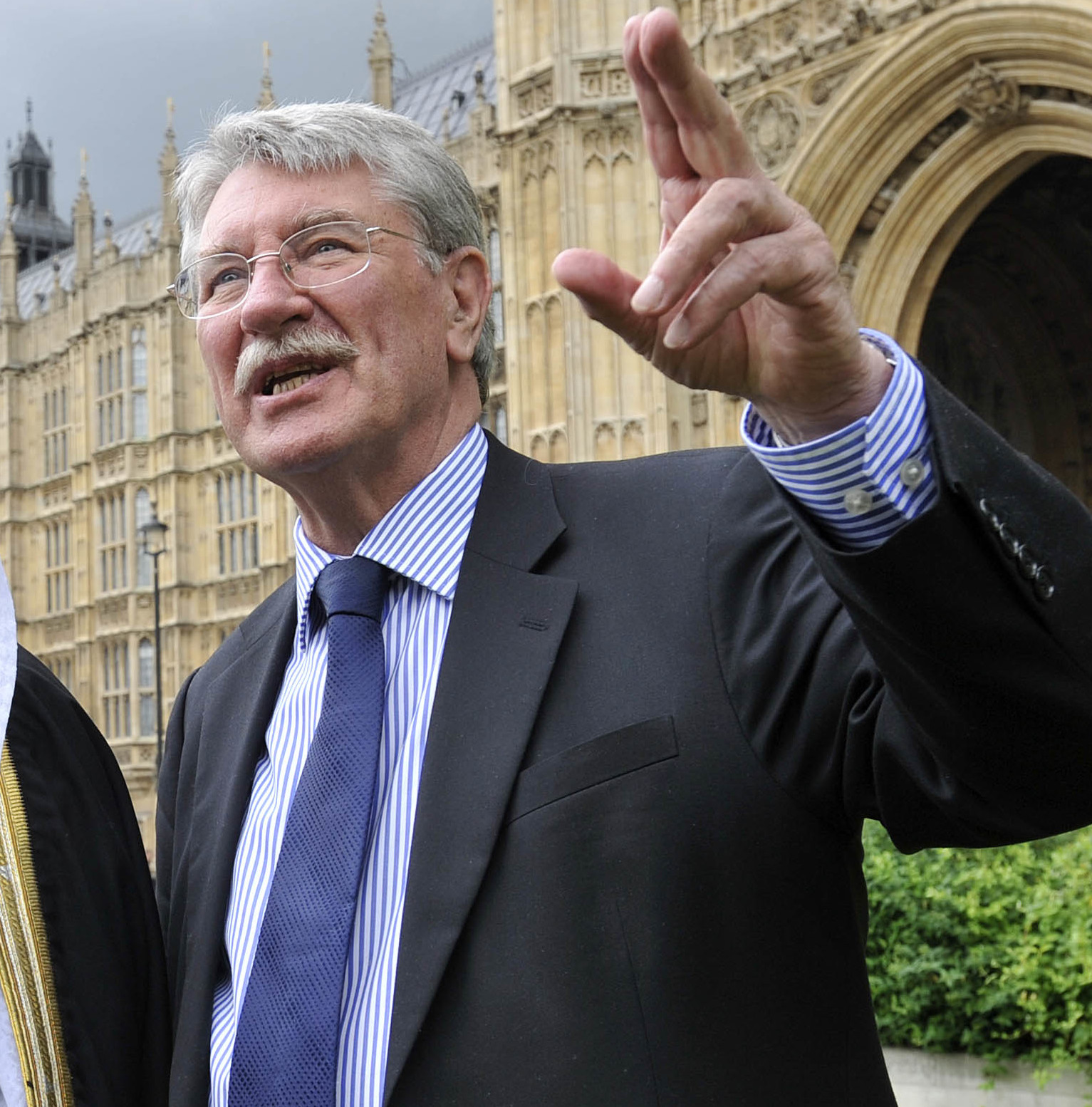
- Macdonald in 2010 outside the Houses of Parliament

Minister for the Cabinet Office Chancellor of the Duchy of Lancaster
- In office 11 June 2001 – 13 June 2003
- Prime Minister: Tony Blair
- Preceded by: Mo Mowlam
- Succeeded by: Douglas Alexander

Minister of State for Transport
- In office 29 July 1999 – 8 June 2001
- Prime Minister: Tony Blair
- Preceded by: Helen Liddell
- Succeeded by: John Spellar

Parliamentary Under-Secretary of State for Scotland
- In office 3 August 1998 – 29 July 1999
- Prime Minister: Tony Blair
- Preceded by: Calum MacDonald
- Succeeded by: Anne McGuire

Member of the House of Lords
- Lord Temporal
- Life peerage 2 October 1998 – 27 April 2017

Personal details
- Born: 20 August 1940 (age 86) Larkhall, United Kingdom
- Party: Labour

Angus John Macdonald, Baron Macdonald of Tradeston, CBE, PC (born 20 August 1940) is a Scottish television executive, life peer and former Labour politician.

== Early life ==
Macdonald was born in Larkhall, Scotland. His father, a Highlander, had poor health and gambled. His mother, who was from a local mining family, worked multiple jobs to support and raise the family.

He won a scholarship to Allan Glen's School, Glasgow, but left at 14 to become an apprentice marine engineer at Alexander Stephen and Sons shipyard in Linthouse on the River Clyde and where he was one of the leaders for the apprentices' strike in 1959 along with fellow members, Billy Connolly and Alex Ferguson. Macdonald was leader of the Govan and Gorbals branch of the Labour Party's Young Socialists.

He moved to London in 1962 where he was briefly involved in revolutionary socialist politics as a member of the International Socialists, living at the London home of its foremost member, Tony Cliff. He has said that he returned to his political roots working at the Labour weekly Tribune around 1964, where he was appointed as the circulation manager by Michael Foot.

== Television ==
He has worked as a journalist on The Scotsman and as a member of the Insight team on The Sunday Times. Originally taken on as a researcher, he was with Granada Television from 1967 to 1986 where he was soon appointed joint editor of World in Action with John Birt; Macdonald had an association with the programme for many years. He also presented Granada's What the Papers Say as well as Right to Reply and "Union World" on Channel 4.

Macdonald returned to Scotland in 1986 as Director of Programmes for Scottish Television. After four years he became managing director, replacing William Brown in 1990. While at STV he overhauled the station's Current Affairs output and cut the core workforce from 800 to 330 and the market value of the company grew from £50m to around £500m. The company took over two newspapers, The Herald and the Evening Times, plus the other ITV contractor in Scotland, Grampian Television. He became non-executive chairman of Scottish Media Group plc at the end of 1997, and Chairman of Taylor and Francis plc in 1998. He was appointed a Commander of the Order of the British Empire (CBE) for services to broadcasting in the 1997 Birthday Honours.

== House of Lords ==
A year after the Labour won the United Kingdom general election Macdonald was made life peer on 2 October 1998 as Baron Macdonald of Tradeston, of Tradeston in the City of Glasgow. As a member of the House of Lords he was then appointed to be Minister for Business and Industry in the Scottish Office (1998–99), followed by Minister for Transport in the Department for Environment, Transport and the Regions, in attendance at cabinet (1999–2001) and Minister for the Cabinet Office and Chancellor of the Duchy of Lancaster (2001–03)

Member of Cabinet Office Advisory Committee on Business Appointments. Also member of House of Lords' Select Committees on Economic Affairs (2004–2008), and Communications (2009–2012).Chair of the All Party Parliamentary Humanist Group.

He retired from the House of Lords on 27 April 2017.

== Other interests ==
In September 1994, Macdonald became President of the Paths for All Partnership which initiated a new programme of public footpath creation across Scotland.

In 2004, he was appointed as an adviser to fund managers Macquarie Infrastructure and Real Assets (Europe) Limited in relation to a new European Infrastructure fund which aimed to invest in road and rail projects. He is on Steering Group of the OECD Futures Programme on Infrastructure and advisory board of OECD International Transport Forum. In 2011, he was invited to deliver the MacMillan Memorial Lecture to the Institution of Engineers and Shipbuilders in Scotland and chose the subject "Bridging the Infrastructure Gap".

Macdonald was installed as Chancellor of Glasgow Caledonian University in October 2007 - June 2012, succeeding Magnus Magnusson. He also served as a Governor of the British Film Institute, a member of the council (2006–2008) and of Court (2009–) at the University of Sussex and is Patron of the Dystonia Society.

== Publications ==
- Macdonald, Gus. Camera: Victorian Eyewitness, B.T. Batsford Ltd, London, 1979, ISBN 0-7134-2095-2
  - (US edition) Camera: Victorian Eyewitness. A History of Photography 1826-1913, The Viking Press, New York, 1980, ISBN 0-6702-0056-5

Political offices
Preceded by Helen Liddell	Minister of State for Transport; 1999–2001	Succeeded by John Spellar
Preceded by Mo Mowlam	Minister for the Cabinet Office; 2001–2003	Succeeded by Douglas Alexander
Preceded by Mo Mowlam	Chancellor of the Duchy of Lancaster; 2001–2003	Succeeded by Douglas Alexander
Academic offices
Preceded by Magnus Magnusson	Chancellor of Glasgow Caledonian University; 2007–2012	Succeeded by Muhammad Yunus
Orders of precedence in the United Kingdom
Preceded by The Lord Harris of Haringey	Gentlemen; Baron Macdonald of Tradeston	Followed by The Lord Patel
