= John Reid, Baron Reid of Cardowan =

Scottish politician (born 1947)

The Right Honourable The Lord Reid of Cardowan PC
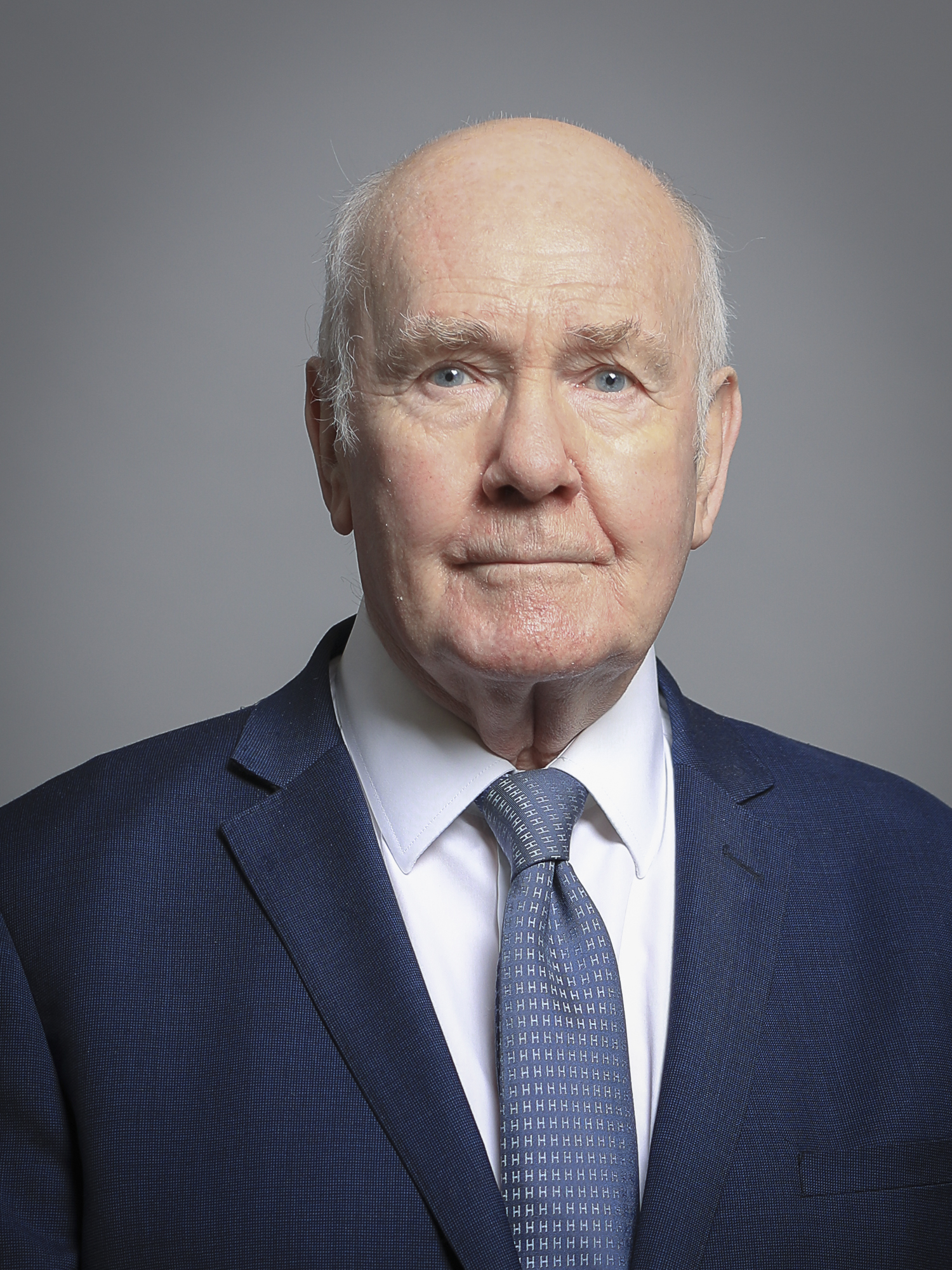
- Official portrait, 2020

Home Secretary
- In office 5 May 2006 – 28 June 2007
- Prime Minister: Tony Blair
- Preceded by: Charles Clarke
- Succeeded by: Jacqui Smith

Secretary of State for Defence
- In office 6 May 2005 – 5 May 2006
- Prime Minister: Tony Blair
- Preceded by: Geoff Hoon
- Succeeded by: Des Browne

Secretary of State for Health
- In office 13 June 2003 – 6 May 2005
- Prime Minister: Tony Blair
- Preceded by: Alan Milburn
- Succeeded by: Patricia Hewitt

Leader of the House of Commons
- In office 4 April 2003 – 13 June 2003
- Prime Minister: Tony Blair
- Preceded by: Robin Cook
- Succeeded by: Peter Hain

Lord President of the Council
- In office 4 April 2003 – 13 June 2003
- Prime Minister: Tony Blair
- Preceded by: Robin Cook
- Succeeded by: The Lord Williams of Mostyn

Minister without Portfolio Chairman of the Labour Party
- In office 24 October 2002 – 4 April 2003
- Prime Minister: Tony Blair
- Preceded by: Charles Clarke
- Succeeded by: Ian McCartney

First Minister of Northern Ireland
- as Secretary of State for Northern Ireland
- In office 14 October 2002 – 24 October 2002
- Monarch: Elizabeth II
- Prime Minister: Tony Blair
- Preceded by: David Trimble (FM); Mark Durkan (dFM)
- Succeeded by: Paul Murphy

Secretary of State for Northern Ireland
- In office 25 January 2001 – 24 October 2002
- Prime Minister: Tony Blair
- Preceded by: Peter Mandelson
- Succeeded by: Paul Murphy

Secretary of State for Scotland
- In office 17 May 1999 – 25 January 2001
- Prime Minister: Tony Blair
- Preceded by: Donald Dewar
- Succeeded by: Helen Liddell
Junior ministerial offices 1997–1999
Minister of State for Transport
In office 27 July 1998 – 17 May 1999
Prime Minister	Tony Blair
Preceded by	Gavin Strang
Succeeded by	Helen Liddell
Minister of State for the Armed Forces
In office 2 May 1997 – 27 July 1998
Prime Minister	Tony Blair
Preceded by	Nicholas Soames
Succeeded by	Doug Henderson
Parliamentary offices
Member of the House of Lords
Lord Temporal
Life peerage 16 July 2010
Member of Parliament for Airdrie and Shotts
In office 5 May 2005 – 12 April 2010
Preceded by	Helen Liddell
Succeeded by	Pamela Nash
Member of Parliament for Hamilton North and Bellshill Motherwell North (1987–1997)
In office 11 June 1987 – 12 April 2005
Preceded by	James Hamilton
Succeeded by	Constituency abolished

Personal details
- Born: John Reid; 8 May 1947 (age 79) Bellshill Maternity Hospital, North Lanarkshire, Scotland
- Party: Labour (since 1979)
- Other political affiliations: Communist Party of Great Britain (1972–1979); Young Communist League (1972–1979)
- Spouses: Cathie McGowan (m. 1969; died 1998); Carine Adler (m. 2002)
- Children: Kevin; Mark
- Education: The Open University; University of Stirling (BA, PhD)
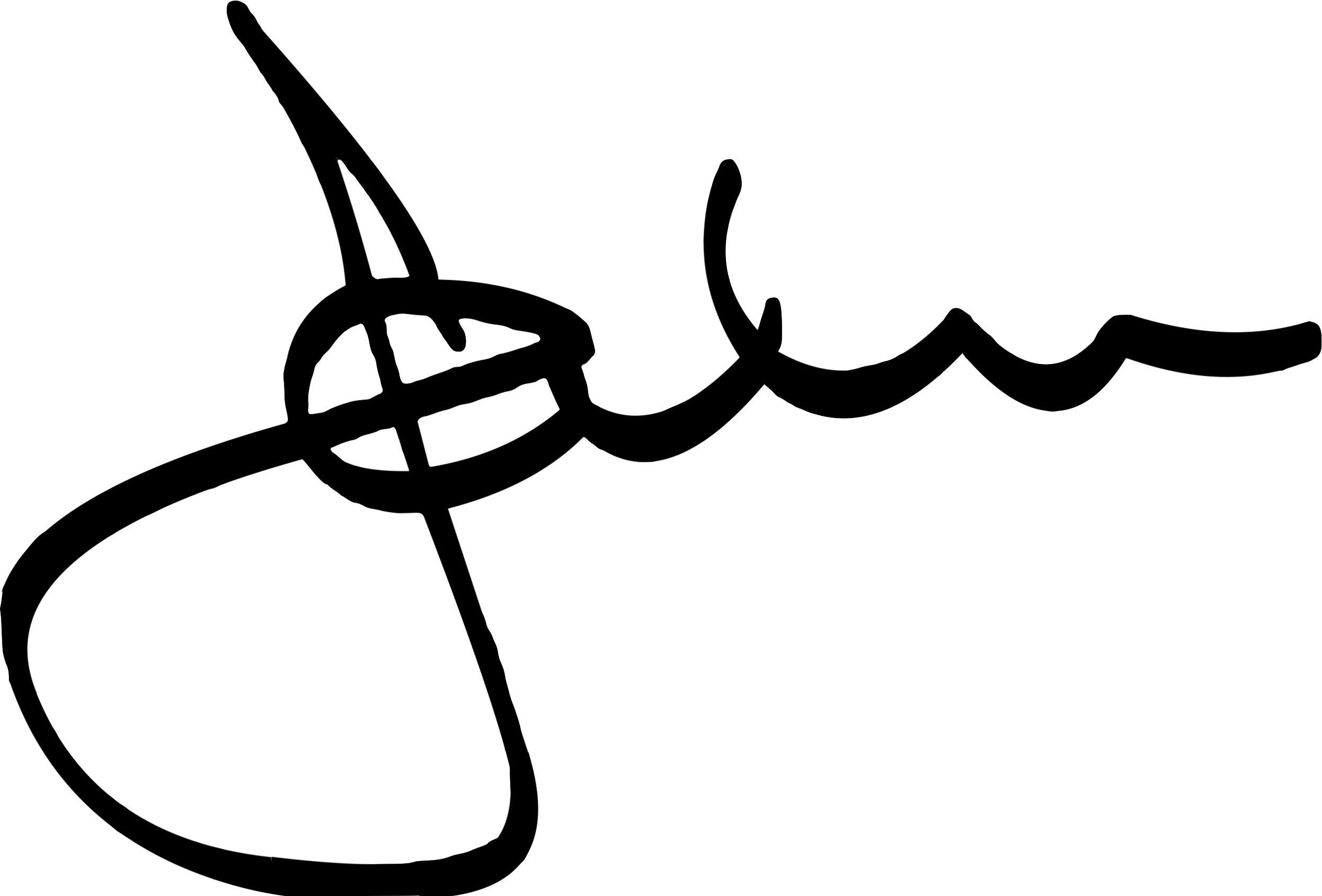
- Signature
- Website: Official website

John Reid, Baron Reid of Cardowan (born 8 May 1947), is a Scottish politician. A member of the Labour Party, he held various Cabinet positions under prime minister Tony Blair from 1999 to 2007, lastly as Home Secretary from 2006 to 2007. He was also a Member of Parliament (MP) from 1987 to 2010 and has been a member of the House of Lords since 2010.

Born in Bellshill to working class, Catholic parents, Reid first became involved in politics when he joined the Young Communist League in 1972. He later joined the Labour Party, working for them as a senior researcher before being elected to the House of Commons in 1987 as the MP for Motherwell North. He served as a junior minister in two departments from 1997, before he was promoted to the Cabinet in 1999; he served continuously in the Cabinet until Blair resigned in 2007. Reid served as Scottish Secretary from 1999 to 2001, Northern Ireland Secretary from 2001 to 2002, Chairman of the Labour Party and Minister without Portfolio from 2002 to 2003, Leader of the House of Commons and Lord President of the Council in 2003, Health Secretary from 2003 to 2005, Defence Secretary from 2005 to 2006 and Home Secretary from 2006 to 2007.

He retired from frontline politics in 2007 following Gordon Brown's appointment as Prime Minister, taking on a role as the Chairman of Celtic Football Club. After stepping down as an MP in 2010, he was nominated for a life peerage in the Dissolution Honours and elevated to the House of Lords. Reid took a leading role in the campaign for a "No" vote in the 2011 AV referendum, appearing alongside Conservative Prime Minister David Cameron, and also took a leading role in the campaign opposing Scottish independence.

== Background ==
Reid was born in Bellshill Maternity Hospital, North Lanarkshire, Scotland, to working-class Roman Catholic parents; his grandparents were of mixed denomination. His grandfather was "a staunch Church of Scotland Presbyterian and his grandmother was an Irish Roman Catholic." His mother, Mary, was a factory worker and his father, Thomas, was a postman.

Reid attended St Patrick's High School, Coatbridge. The adolescent Reid showed an early talent for organisation and political activism by leading a student strike in protest at a school rule. Reid initially decided not to go to university but instead took a series of jobs, including construction work on an oil pipeline and another in insurance; at the latter job, which Reid later claimed opened his eyes politically, he was assigned to the tenements in the East End of Glasgow after the city was hit by storms in late-1968 and saw poverty of a kind he did not know existed. Soon after this experience, he joined the Labour Party.

Around this time Reid's passion for history was kindled when his girlfriend (and later wife), Cathie McGowan, bought him a copy of The Rise and Fall of the Third Reich by William L. Shirer. Reid was spellbound. Following this he attended the Open University in his mid-twenties to study a Foundation Course and then later attended the University of Stirling, becoming rector of the Students' Union and gaining a BA in history and a PhD in economic history, with a thesis on slavery in Africa written as a critique of the Marxist model of historical change, titled Warrior Aristocrats in Crisis: the political effects of the transition from the slave trade to palm oil commerce in the nineteenth century Kingdom of Dahomey.

From 1979 to 1983, Reid was a research officer for the Labour Party in Scotland, and from 1983 to 1985, was a political adviser to Labour leader Neil Kinnock. From 1986 to 1987, he was Scottish Organiser of Trade Unionists for Labour. He entered parliament at the 1987 general election as MP for the Motherwell North constituency. After boundary changes, he was returned at the 1997 election for the new constituency of Hamilton North and Bellshill; and after further boundary changes in 2005, he was returned at the 2005 election for the new constituency of Airdrie and Shotts with 59% of the votes cast.

Reid was married to Cathie McGowan from 1969 until her sudden death from a heart attack in 1998. They had two sons, Kevin and Mark. In 2002, he married film director Carine Adler.

According to The Guardian, in 1991, Reid arrived at the House of Commons "drunk one day and tried to force his way on to the floor to vote. When an attendant stepped forward to stop him, Reid threw a punch". Reid stopped drinking in 1994 and gave up his 60-a-day cigarette habit in 2003.

== Political ideology ==
At university, Reid was a member of the Communist Party of Great Britain. With the support of Communist and Labour students, he became president of the students' union. After leaving university, he became a professional Labour Party activist, linked politically with Neil Kinnock.

As an advisor to Neil Kinnock, Reid was one of the earliest advocates for reforms to the Labour Party. In 1983, after the Labour Party's worst electoral defeat in 65 years, and at Kinnock's request, he put on a single sheet of paper what he thought had made Labour unelectable: "Leaderless, unpatriotic, dominated by demagogues, policies fifteen years out of date". Elected to Parliament in 1987 as the Member of Parliament for Motherwell North, within two years he was appointed to the Shadow Front Bench as spokesperson for Children. In 1990, Reid was appointed as Defence spokesperson.

When the former Yugoslavia was breaking up in the 1990s, Reid was in dialogue with the Bosnian Serbs. During the Bosnian War, Reid struck up a friendship with Radovan Karadžić, later to be indicted as a war criminal. Reid admitted he spent three days at a luxury Geneva lakeside hotel as a guest of Karadžić in 1993.

== Government career ==
=== Minister of State for the Armed Forces ===
After Labour came to power at the 1997 general election, Reid became Armed Forces Minister, where he played a key role in the Defence Secretary George Robertson's Strategic Defence Review. Reid gained considerable praise for the review; with some commentators going so far as to describe his success in cutting military expenditure at the same time as winning over the defence chiefs as "brilliant". As Minister he lobbied for the release of two Scots Guards convicted of murdering teenager Peter McBride in Belfast in 1992. At the same time he refused requests to meet the McBride family. Reid eventually met with the McBride family whilst he was Secretary of State for Northern Ireland.

=== Minister for Transport ===
In 1998, Reid moved from Defence to become Minister of State for Transport. Prime Minister Tony Blair then sent Reid to the Department of Transport to ensure the late-running and over-budget London Underground Jubilee Line Extension was completed by the end of 2000. He and John Prescott brought in Bechtel as Project Managers, ensuring Phase 1 was opened on 1 May 1999, and the whole Jubilee line with the exception of one station (Westminster) was ultimately open for business by the Millennium. Reid demonstrated several aspects: he negotiated strongly; he was a political fighter; he had a "capacity for non-dogmatic adaptability and reliability"; and was described as "a safe pair of hands".

=== Secretary of State for Scotland ===
Having impressed at both Transport and Defence Reid was promoted to Secretary of State for Scotland on 17 May 1999 and a full place at the cabinet table.

In his first month, the Scottish Parliament was re-established after an interval of 300 years. The reconstituted Scotland Office had been much reduced in importance with devolution but Reid used the position to build his profile, prepared to put the government's case on any issue against TV interviewers.

After Donald Dewar, Scotland's respected First Minister, died in 2000 Reid's name was even mentioned as a possible replacement. In fact Reid was left to deal with much of the fall-out after the death and would be increasingly at loggerheads with the new Labour First Minister, Henry McLeish, whom Reid felt was taking the Parliament down a nationalist path. The situation became so strained between the two that in an unguarded moment McLeish publicly labelled Reid "a patronising bastard".

=== Secretary of State for Northern Ireland ===
Reid became Secretary of State for Northern Ireland in January 2001 following the resignation of Peter Mandelson. He was the first Roman Catholic to hold the position. While dismissing the personal significance of this, he used it to insist that every person in Northern Ireland, from whatever background or tradition, wanted a prosperous future.

Throughout his period of office he was continually engaged in talks with all side of the community in an attempt to reduce the level of inter-community troubles. He blamed paramilitaries from both sides of the community for the ongoing violence. He confronted both, on the ground, at a violent east Belfast interface, where he met loyalist residents of Cluan Place and then had talks with nationalist residents in the nearby Short Strand.

Reid ruled that ceasefires proclaimed by the Ulster Defence Association and the Loyalist Volunteer Force could no longer be recognised by the government because of their involvement in sectarian attacks and murders. At the same time he put pressure on the Provisional Irish Republican Army (IRA) to make a move on arms decommissioning to help end the political impasse, whilst acknowledging that putting its weapons beyond use would be a difficult step to take.

It was in this context that, in October 2001 he welcomed a Gerry Adams speech as a "highly significant" step which he hoped would pave the way for a "groundbreaking" move by the IRA to disarm which would transform the political situation. And following the IRA's decision Reid responded by announcing the immediate demolition of British Army security bases and announcing a reduction in troop levels as the security situation improved, effectively beginning a process which culminated in September 2005, when the disarmament monitor for Northern Ireland, the Canadian General John de Chastelain announced that the IRA had given up its entire arsenal of weapons after more than three decades of armed struggle against British rule.

Reid oversaw the final stages of the transformation of the RUC into the Police Service Northern Ireland, and the first endorsement of the service by representatives of the Nationalist community.

Political problems continued, resulting in the suspension of the Northern Ireland Assembly a year later in October 2002. The peace process was to be put on hold until there was a "clear and unequivocal commitment" that the IRA would disband. Reid made an emergency statement to Parliament announcing direct rule in the interim.

In the interim, Reid also had to deal with continuing domestic problems; including those with loyalist ceasefires, sectarian murders and the tinderbox of Holy Cross primary school in north Belfast (that ignited the worst rioting in the city in years). But, so far as 10 Downing Street was concerned, Reid had gone a long way to delivering the rarest of political commodities – success in Northern Ireland.

=== Chairman of the Labour Party and Minister without Portfolio ===
Reid was appointed Chairman of the Labour Party and Minister Without Portfolio on 24 October 2002.

In this purely political post, his trouble-shooting skills were employed as the Labour Government's chief spokesperson; this earned him the nickname "Minister for the Today Programme".

One of Reid's key challenges was to keep the trade unions (the Labour Party's main funders) onside despite the antipathy shown by the unions to many of the Government's proposals. As part of this, Reid agreed to look at proposals to stop private contractors exploiting low-paid workers (a key union demand).

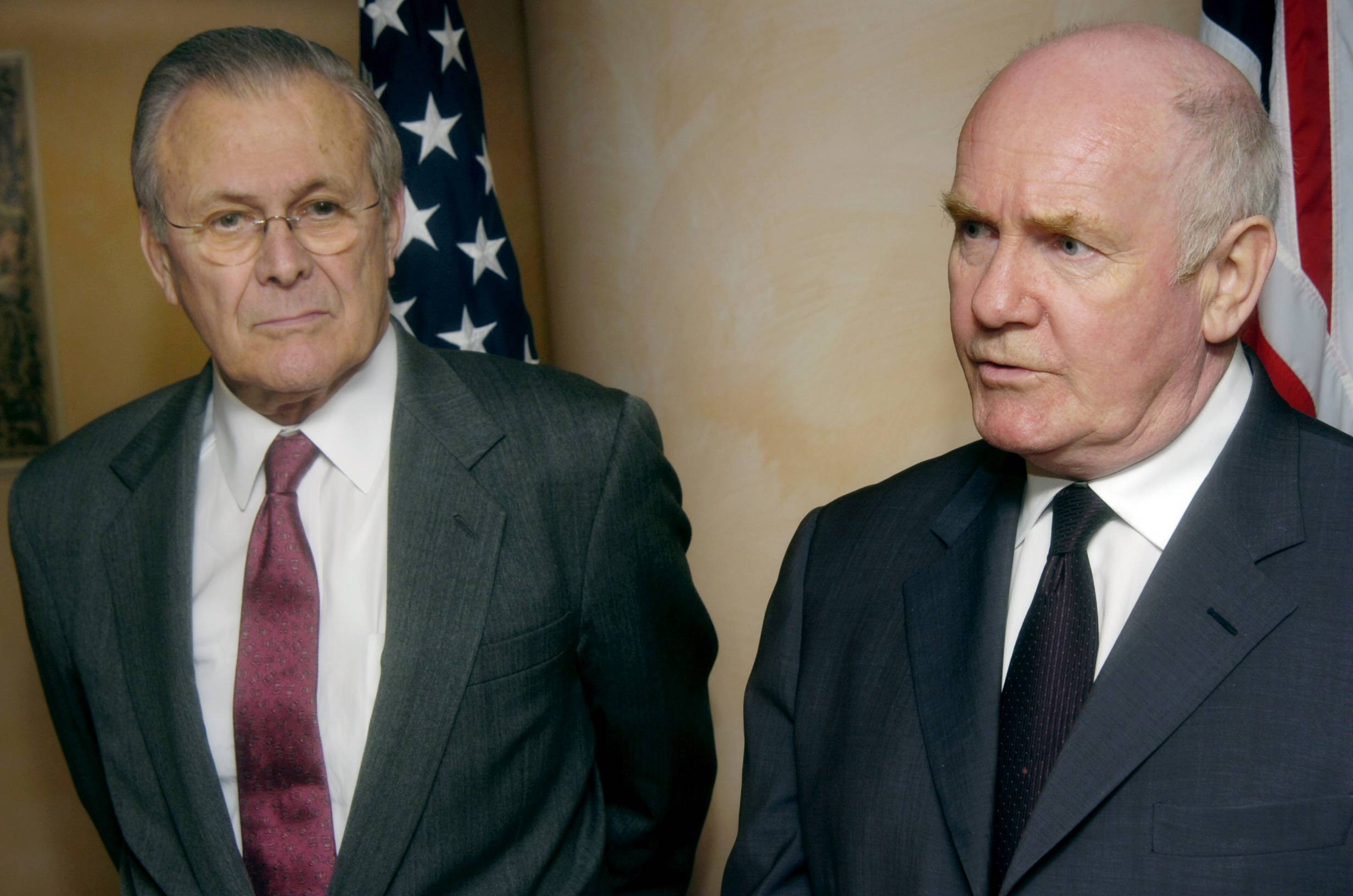
Reid and United States Secretary of Defense Donald Rumsfeld answer press questions in Taormina, Sicily (9 February 2006)

=== Leader of the House of Commons and Lord President of the Council ===
In March 2003, Robin Cook resigned as Leader of the House of Commons due to his objections to the legality of Britain's involvement in the Iraq War. Reid was appointed to take over the role on 4 April; it was thought that a heavyweight figure was more likely to ensure the Commons' continued support for the war. He held the position for only a little over two months and was succeeded by a more junior member of the Government, Peter Hain.

=== Secretary of State for Health ===
Reid was made Secretary of State for Health in June 2003, replacing Alan Milburn after the latter's resignation. He was reportedly less than happy with the appointment. He was reported by Private Eye at the time as reacting "Oh fuck, not health." But Reid had established himself as one of Tony Blair's most trusted ministers, and his appointment as Health Secretary took him into his fourth cabinet job in less than a year.

At Health, Reid saw himself as a reformer, controversially increasing capacity by introducing private companies to run treatment centres for knee, hip and eye operations. He claimed this provided extra staff and extra capacity to help treat more patients in the NHS at an unprecedented rate.

Reid also introduced plans to increase the number of smoke-free workplaces and improve diet and sexual health as part of a major drive to improve public health in England and began a major public consultation as a precursor to parliamentary proposals aimed at improving the nation's health. He also encouraged volunteer engagement in the health service.

Many of his changes caused criticism and controversy, which Reid was not afraid to take head on, delivering a staunch defence of Labour's reform programme to the party's annual conference. He made the case for extending to all the choices normally only available to those who could afford them. Reid's management style was considered autocratic by some and he came under considerable fire from National Health Service (NHS) leaders. He was criticized for giving GPs a 22% pay rise while also allowing them to opt out of providing weekend and evening treatment.

As Health Secretary, Reid had been in favour of limiting the government's proposed smoking ban as much as possible. In their 2005 election manifesto, he introduced a pledge to ban smoking in all places where food was served. His successor Patricia Hewitt favoured a complete ban. Reid won in the cabinet, gaining an exemption for private clubs and pubs that did not serve food. The House of Commons rebels proposing a complete ban were successful when MPs were given a free vote on the issue. Patricia Hewitt voted with the rebels against the Cabinet's proposals.

=== Secretary of State for Defence ===
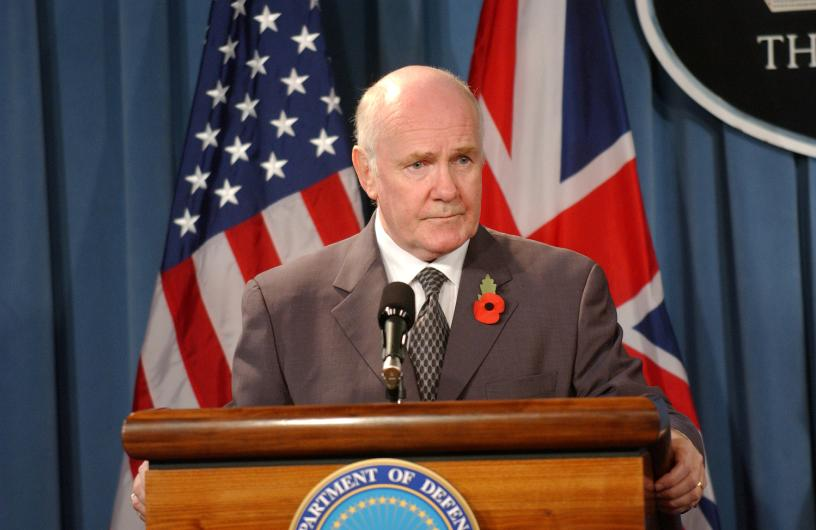
Reid answers questions at a Pentagon briefing on 7 November 2005.

Following the incumbent Labour Party's 2005 general election victory, Reid was appointed Secretary of State for Defence. He replaced Geoff Hoon.

At Defence, Reid questioned "the adequacy of the international legal framework in the light of modern developments in conflict". He suggested that "the body of relevant international rules and conventions should, where beneficial, be strengthened", especially "to cope with conflict against non-state actors such as the international terrorist… this means extending, not reducing, such conventions".

Reid committed 3,300 troops to Helmand province, Afghanistan in January 2006. Despite a lack of detailed intelligence, the Army anticipated the Helmand mission would be straightforward compared to its difficult mission in Basra it was withdrawing from, with short small patrols from fixed bases. In speaking to the media Reid said "We would be perfectly happy to leave in three years and without firing one shot because our job is to protect the reconstruction." In the first year about 4 million bullets and 25,000 artillery rounds had been fired by the British armed forces.

Reid took an aggressive approach to defending his government's international policy. Speaking ahead of a conference on NATO modernisation in Germany on 4 February 2006, Reid asserted in a press interview that "no institution has the divine right to exist". Similarly on 19 March 2006, in response to former interim Iraqi prime minister Iyad Allawi's claim that Iraq is in the grip of civil war, Reid defended the British Government's contrary view. He stated: "Every single politician I have met here [in Iraq] from the prime minister to the president, the defence minister and indeed Iyad Allawi himself said to me there's an increase in the sectarian killing, but there's not a civil war and we will not allow a civil war to develop".

By the time of the 2006 Israel-Lebanon Conflict, Reid was no longer Defence Secretary, having been succeeded by Des Browne.

On 3 February 2010, Reid gave evidence about his role as Defence Secretary to the Iraq Inquiry. He said that America's experience of the Vietnam War had impacted negatively on US post-invasion planning in Iraq because US military chiefs "weren't thinking of detailed nation-building". Reid also said he had "deep sadness at the loss of life" in Iraq.

=== Home Secretary ===
Reid was appointed Home Secretary on 5 May 2006, replacing Charles Clarke after the latter was removed in the wake of a Home Office scandal involving the release of foreign national prisoners.

On 2 July 2006, Reid proposed a Bill for the autumn Queen's Speech, to be brought into law at the next session of Parliament. He proposed a new Official Secrets Act, the first since the 1989 OSA, to punish with longer prison sentences intelligence officers who blow the whistle on government policy by leaking secret information. To remove their key legal defence of necessity and/or defence of public interest.

By the time he arrived at the Home Office, Reid was seen as one of the government's most effective performers over the previous decade, being described by many commentators as a bruiser, but with a strong academic leaning.

At the Home Office Reid hit the ground running. He contended that rapid global change and the associated challenges of mass migration, terrorism and organised crime had overwhelmed the outdated Home Office approach. Reid caused considerable controversy by attacking the leadership and management systems previously in place in the Home Office. He declared it to be "not fit for purpose", adding the phrase to the British political lexicon, and vowed to "make the public feel safe".

Reid's comments were rebuffed by Clarke, who criticised his comments in a defence of his own period in office.

Within 100 days of joining the department, he had published three reform plans for a radical transformation. They included 8,000 more prison places; a 40 per cent reduction in headquarters staff by 2010; a commitment to making the Immigration and Nationality Directorate an agency with a uniformed border staff and tough new powers. radical overhaul of the core systems and structures within the Home Office itself, reform of IND, re-balancing of the criminal justice system, reform of the probation service and the review of counter-terrorist capabilities.

He condemned the probation service for letting people down, and argued for fundamental reform. An early decision during his time at the Home Office was to move child molesters living in hostels near schools further away from them. Reid also caused controversy in August 2006 by calling for the creation of an independent committee to impose a national annual limit on the number of immigrants entering the UK. The Guardian claimed that Reid was "playing to the racist gallery" and compared his plans to Soviet-style central planning of the economy.

Because of the prisons' overcrowding crisis in Birmingham, on 9 October 2006 he announced emergency measures amid fears that the prison population was nearing maximum capacity. Reid has announced his support of measures to restrict the ability of extremist messages to be disseminated on the Internet so as to make the web a more hostile place for terrorists.

In 2006 Reid and the Home Office lost their appeal against the High Court ruling in the Afghan hijackers case 2006. In this controversial case, a group of nine Afghan men who hijacked a Boeing 727 in February 2000, while fleeing the Taliban regime in Afghanistan, were granted leave to remain in the United Kingdom. The original ruling in 2004 ruled that returning the men to Afghanistan would breach their human rights under the Human Rights Act 1998. The Home Office granted the men "temporary leave to remain", which involved restricting their freedom of movement and did not allow them to work; in 2006, the High Court ruled that the men must be granted "discretionary leave to remain", which includes the right to work. Reid challenged the ruling in the Court of Appeal, arguing that the Home Office "should have the power to grant only temporary admission to failed asylum seekers who are only allowed to stay in the UK due to their human rights".

Reid accused government's critics of putting national security at risk by their failure to recognise the serious nature of the threat facing Britain. and called for reform of the human rights laws.

From 1 August 2006, Reid introduced a new warning system to alert the public to the threat of attacks by al-Qaeda and other terror groups in order to increase public understanding and awareness of the terrorist threat. Announcing the plans, Reid told MPs that the terrorist threat would only be overcome by "united action by all of us" and urged the public to remain vigilant at all times. The threat level, already at "Severe", the second highest level, then moved even higher.

On 10 August, Reid announced that the UK had been put on its highest state of security alert, after police said they had thwarted the 2006 transatlantic aircraft plot, which planned to simultaneously detonate liquid explosives, carried aboard airliners travelling from the United Kingdom to the United States and Canada, disguised as soft drinks. Extreme security measures had been put in place at all the country's airports.

Reid revealed that the alleged terror plot could have caused civilian casualties on an "unprecedented scale" and security sources said an attack was believed to have been imminent. With 21 people in custody, Reid said he believed the 'main players' had been 'accounted for' but emphasised that that still left possible "unknown" players. Reid also revealed that at least four major plots had been thwarted in the previous year and security sources confirmed that two dozen major terrorist conspiracies were under investigation. Reid issued a dire warning against losing the "battle of ideas" with al-Qa'eda, and called for an urgent but controversial escalation in the propaganda war, saying that the government needed to do much more to win the battle of ideas.

Reid then led European Ministers in efforts to make the Internet a "more hostile" place for terrorists and crack down on people using the web to share information on explosives or spread propaganda.

In September 2006, Reid addressed Muslims in a run-down part of east London, warning them that fanatics were looking to groom and brainwash children for suicide bombings. During the speech he was confronted and barracked by Abu Izzadeen, also known as Omar or Trevor Brooks. Mr Brooks is a leader of the UK-banned Al Ghurabaa, an offshoot of the terrorist-supporting Al-Muhajiroun – a man who many accuse of glorifying terrorism and inciting racial hatred during nightly conversations (often using the nom de plume Abu Baraa) on a New York-based chatroom service.

After the high-profile at the Home Office, his tough stance on terrorism and his domination of the headlines in the aftermath of the alleged terror plot, Reid was increasingly tipped by Labour MPs to stand for the party's leadership.

In fact, Reid kept everyone guessing about his leadership intentions until the very end. Ultimately the surprise was that, having decided not to stand, he announced his intention to quit frontline politics and return to the backbenches. It was speculated that, as a true Blairite believer, he either wanted to carry the torch of reform himself as Labour leader or else quit the scene altogether to make way for new blood.

=== Resignation from government ===
In May 2007, Reid announced his intention to resign from the Cabinet when Tony Blair left office, and stated his plans to return to the Labour backbenches. He stated he would support Gordon Brown in the leadership election and his administration. Reid left office as Home Secretary on 27 June 2007 and was replaced by Jacqui Smith the next day.

In September 2007 he announced that he would not seek re-election at the next general election.

Reid was linked with a return to cabinet in June 2009 under Gordon Brown but reportedly turned down the offer.

== Votes ==
In December 2004 and October 2005, Reid voted in favour of a bill to introduce a compulsory British national identity card. He voted for the NHS foundation trust proposal. He also voted in favour of allowing unmarried heterosexual and homosexual couples to adopt, and for lowering the age of consent for gay sex to 16. Reid voted for the replacement of the Trident system. He voted against all the House of Lords reform options except a fully appointed House of Lords.

On the introduction of Labour's anti-terrorism laws, he opposed an amendment that would have limited the fingerprinting and strip-searching of persons detained at a police station to those detained in connection with a terrorism investigation. He voted against changing the text in the Prevention of Terrorism Bill from "The Secretary of State may make a control order against an individual" to "The Secretary of State may apply to the court for a control order...."

In March 2003, he voted against a motion that the case had not yet been made for war against Iraq, and voted for the declaration of war against Iraq. In June 2007, he voted against a motion calling for an independent inquiry by a committee of Privy Counsellors into the Iraq War.

== After cabinet ==
On 10 May 2010, Reid argued on BBC television that David Cameron should become the next Prime Minister in the interests of honouring the democratic wishes of the British people, with the Conservative Party having received more votes than any other party. Had Labour and the Liberal Democrats formed an alliance, their combined votes would outnumber Conservative votes at the 2010 general election, but Reid noted that a Labour/Liberal Democrat alliance would not have the numbers to form a parliamentary majority by themselves.

The same month, it was announced that Reid had been made a life peer in the dissolution honours following the 2010 election. He was created Baron Reid of Cardowan, of Stepps in Lanarkshire on 16 July 2010.

In April 2011, to the discomfort of Labour colleagues, he campaigned with the Conservative Prime Minister David Cameron and others against changes to the UK's voting system. During the campaign, he made the claim that the alternative vote would violate the principle of one person one vote. He wrote that "it gives the supporters of unpopular fringe candidates numerous votes, while mainstream voters only get one". The referendum on the Alternative Vote was won decisively by Reid's "No" side.

In April 2013, Reid said that Labour had made a mistake with immigration while in government, and now in opposition was not providing an alternative.

In June 2014, Reid appeared in a full-page advert in the Scottish Catholic Observer, encouraging readers to vote against Scottish independence in the September referendum. The advert failed to state who had paid for it, which is a breach of Electoral Commission rules, and following complaints, Reid revealed that it had been paid for by an organisation led by Willie Haughey. The referendum resulted in a "No" vote.

== Expenses ==
Following the political scandal over MP expenses in 2009, Sir Thomas Legg requested Reid repay £2,731.88 of his claimed expenses. Reid chose to repay a total of £7,336.51. He was later one of 23 MPs who asked for a refund of some of the money they had repaid, and received £4,604.63 back.

== Outside politics ==
=== Football ===
On 28 September 2007, it was announced Reid would become Chairman of Celtic Football Club taking over from Brian Quinn. His appointment was ratified by Celtic's shareholders on 19 November 2007. Sports journalist Graham Spiers found him "an engaging and intriguing Celtic chairman".

Reid is a lifelong supporter of the club, and described the appointment as "an honour and a privilege".

=== University of London ===
In late 2008 it was announced that Reid would be taking up the post of honorary Professor at the University College London and become the chairman of the newly created Institute of Security and Resilience Studies (ISRS) at UCL.

=== G4S ===
On 18 December 2008, G4S (Group 4 Securicor) announced that Reid would be taking up a post with the company as group consultant.

=== Top Level Group ===
Reid is currently a member of the Top Level Group of UK Parliamentarians for Multilateral Nuclear Disarmament and Non-proliferation, established in October 2009.

== Awards ==
In June 2009, Reid was awarded an honorary degree from Stirling University "for his contribution to public affairs".

Parliament of the United Kingdom
Preceded by James Hamilton	Member of Parliament for Motherwell North; 1987–1997	Constituency abolished
New constituency	Member of Parliament for Hamilton North and Bellshill; 1997–2005	Constituency abolished
Preceded by Helen Liddell	Member of Parliament for Airdrie and Shotts; 2005–2010	Succeeded by Pamela Nash
Political offices
Preceded by Nicholas Soames	Minister of State for the Armed Forces; 1997–1998	Succeeded by Doug Henderson
Preceded by Gavin Strang	Minister of State for Transport; 1998–1999	Succeeded by Helen Liddell
Preceded by Donald Dewar	Secretary of State for Scotland; 1999–2001	Succeeded by Helen Liddell
Preceded by Peter Mandelson	Secretary of State for Northern Ireland; 2001–2002	Succeeded by Paul Murphy
Preceded by Charles Clarke	Minister without Portfolio; 2002–2003	Succeeded by Ian McCartney
Preceded by Robin Cook	Leader of the House of Commons; 2003	Succeeded by Peter Hain
Preceded by Robin Cook	Lord President of the Council; 2003	Succeeded by The Lord Williams of Mostyn
Preceded by Alan Milburn	Secretary of State for Health; 2003–2005	Succeeded by Patricia Hewitt
Preceded by Geoff Hoon	Secretary of State for Defence; 2005–2006	Succeeded by Des Browne
Preceded by Charles Clarke	Home Secretary; 2006–2007	Succeeded by Jacqui Smith
Party political offices
Preceded by Charles Clarke	Labour Party Chair; 2002–2003	Succeeded by Ian McCartney
Sporting positions
Preceded by Brian Quinn	Chairman of the Celtic Football Club; 2007–2011	Succeeded by Ian Bankier
Orders of precedence in the United Kingdom
Preceded by The Lord Taylor of Goss Moor	Gentlemen; Baron Reid of Cardowan	Followed by The Lord Faulks
