= Helen Liddell =

British politician (born 1950)

The Right Honourable The Baroness Liddell of Coatdyke PC
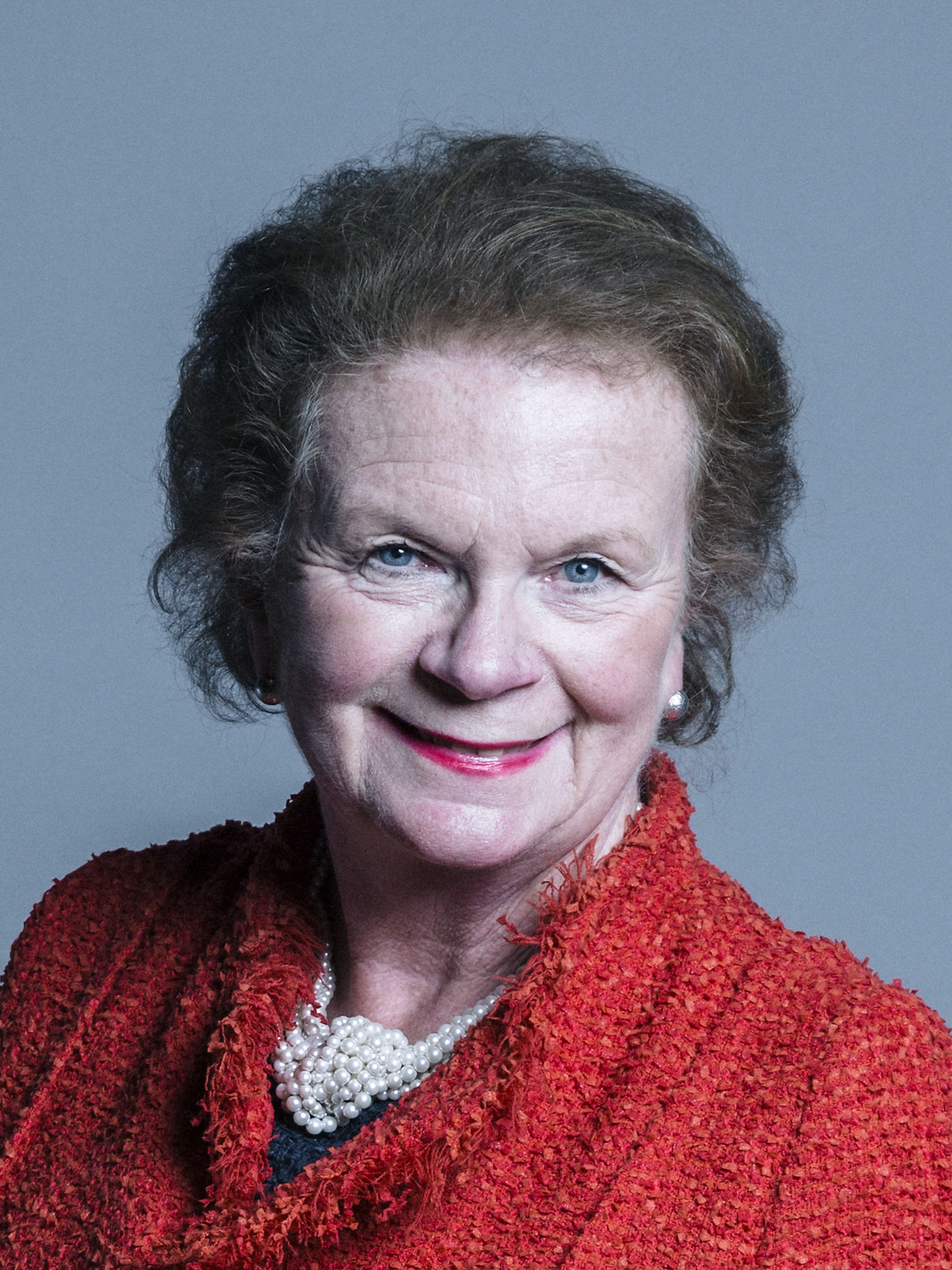
- Official portrait, 2018

British High Commissioner to Australia
- In office 1 September 2005 – 1 October 2009
- Monarch: Elizabeth II
- Prime Minister: Tony Blair; Gordon Brown
- Preceded by: The Lord Goodlad
- Succeeded by: The Baroness Amos

Secretary of State for Scotland
- In office 24 January 2001 – 12 June 2003
- Prime Minister: Tony Blair
- Preceded by: John Reid
- Succeeded by: Alistair Darling

Minister of State for Trade and Industry
- In office 29 July 1999 – 24 January 2001
- Prime Minister: Tony Blair
- Preceded by: John Battle
- Succeeded by: Peter Hain

Minister of State for Transport
- In office 17 May 1999 – 29 July 1999
- Prime Minister: Tony Blair
- Preceded by: John Reid
- Succeeded by: The Lord Macdonald of Tradeston

Minister of State for Scotland
- In office 28 July 1998 – 17 May 1999
- Prime Minister: Tony Blair
- Preceded by: Brian Wilson
- Succeeded by: Brian Wilson

Economic Secretary to the Treasury
- In office 3 May 1997 – 27 July 1998
- Prime Minister: Tony Blair
- Preceded by: Angela Knight
- Succeeded by: Patricia Hewitt

Member of the House of Lords
- Lord Temporal
- Life peerage 7 July 2010

Member of Parliament for Airdrie and Shotts Monklands East (1994–1997)
- In office 30 June 1994 – 11 April 2005
- Preceded by: John Smith
- Succeeded by: John Reid

Personal details
- Born: 6 December 1950 (age 75) Coatbridge, North Lanarkshire, Scotland
- Party: Labour
- Spouse: Alistair Handerson Liddell (m. 1972)
- Children: 2
- Education: University of Strathclyde

Helen Lawrie Liddell, Baroness Liddell of Coatdyke PC (née Reilly; born 6 December 1950) is a British politician and life peer who served as Secretary of State for Scotland from 2001 to 2003 and British High Commissioner to Australia from 2005 to 2009. A member of the Labour Party, she was Member of Parliament (MP) for Airdrie and Shotts, previously Monklands East, from 1994 to 2005.

== Early life ==
Liddell was born to Hugh Reilly, a Catholic, and Bridget Lawrie Reilly, a Protestant. She was educated at St. Patrick's Catholic High School in Coatbridge, attending at the same time as John Reid, and graduated from the University of Strathclyde with a BA in Economics.

== Early career ==
Liddell worked as a BBC Scotland economics journalist from 1976 to 1977. At the age of 26, she served as the first female General Secretary of the Scottish Labour Party from 1977 to 1988. She was subsequently public affairs director of the Daily Record and Sunday Mail, working for media proprietor Robert Maxwell.

== Business Interests ==
Appointed Director of Annington Limited, 1 April 2017. The British Ministry of Defence, as of November 2022, are trying to regain ownership of the housing stock that was sold off to Annington in 1996. As Chair of Annington, Baroness Liddell defended Annington via a letter to the British Defence Secretary saying she was "shocked" by the Government's approach.

== Parliamentary career ==
She first contested the Parliamentary constituency of East Fife at the October 1974 general election.

=== House of Commons ===
Liddell was first elected to Parliament in 1994, at the closely contested Monklands East by-election following John Smith's death. She was appointed a Privy Councillor on 27 October 1998.

She was Secretary of State for Scotland from 2001 to 2003, a position whose powers had been transferred to the Scottish Executive after devolution in 1999. In addition, she angered the monks of Buckfast Abbey when she called on them to stop selling Buckfast in Scotland. She was dubbed Minister for Monarch of the Glen after several visits to the set of the hit BBC series.

The disclosure that she was able to work French lessons into her ministerial diary, raised questions about the relevance of Scottish Secretary's job post-devolution. The role was abolished as a full-time position in 2003, when the Scotland Office was rolled into the Department for Constitutional Affairs.

She took up appointment as British High Commissioner to Australia in the summer of 2005, and was succeeded in the role by Baroness Amos in October 2009.

=== House of Lords ===
On 28 May 2010, it was announced in the Dissolution Honours List that she would be created a life peer. On 7 July, she took the title Baroness Liddell of Coatdyke, of Airdrie in the County of Lanarkshire, six days later becoming a member of the House of Lords. She is a member of Labour Friends of Israel. In 2010–11 Liddell was a member of the independent Philips inquiry into the 1994 RAF Chinook crash on the Mull of Kintyre, established by the Secretary of State for Defence.

== Personal life ==
She married Alistair Liddell in 1972; they have one son and one daughter.

== Publications ==
- Liddell, Helen (1990). Elite. Century.

Parliament of the United Kingdom
Preceded by John Smith	Member of Parliament for Monklands East; 1994–1997	Constituency abolished
New constituency	Member of Parliament for Airdrie and Shotts; 1997–2005	Succeeded by John Reid
Political offices
Preceded by Angela Knight	Economic Secretary to the Treasury; 1997–1998	Succeeded by Patricia Hewitt
Preceded by John Reid	Minister of State for Transport; 1999	Succeeded by The Lord Macdonald of Tradeston
Preceded by John Reid	Secretary of State for Scotland; 2001–2003	Succeeded by Alistair Darling
Diplomatic posts
Preceded by The Lord Goodlad	British High Commissioner to Australia; 2005–2009	Succeeded by The Baroness Amos
