= Labour Party (UK) =

Political party

- Governing body: National Executive Committee
- Leader: Andy Burnham
- Deputy Leader: Lucy Powell
- Lords Leader: The Baroness Smith of Basildon
- Chair: Bridget Phillipson
- General Secretary: Joe Fortune
- Founded: 27 February 1900; 126 years ago (as the Labour Representation Committee)
- Headquarters: Labour Party Headquarters: 20 Rushworth Street, London SE1 0SS; Labour Central, Kings Manor, Newcastle upon Tyne NE1 6PA
- Student wing: Labour Students
- Youth wing: Young Labour
- Women's wing: Labour Women's Network
- LGBT wing: LGBT+ Labour
- Membership (December 2025): 264,754
- Ideology: Social democracy
- Political position: Centre-left
- European affiliation: Party of European Socialists
- European Parliament group: Progressive Alliance of Socialists and Democrats (observer)
- International affiliation: Progressive Alliance; Socialist International (observer)
- Affiliate party: Co-operative Party (Labour and Co-operative Party) Former affiliates: Independent Labour Party (1906–1932); British Socialist Party (1916–1920); National Socialist Party (1918–1939/1942)
- Northern Irish affiliation: Social Democratic and Labour Party
- Colours: Red
- Slogan: Hope Again (2026)
- Anthem: "The Red Flag"
- Devolved or semi-autonomous branches: London Labour; Scottish Labour; Welsh Labour; Labour Party in Northern Ireland
- Parliamentary party: Parliamentary Labour Party (PLP)
- Affiliated trade unions: List of affiliated trade unions: ASLEF; Community; CWU; FBU; GMB; MU; NUM; TSSA; UNISON; Unite; USDAW
- House of Commons: 404 / 650
- House of Lords: 232 / 796
- Scottish Parliament: 17 / 129
- Senedd: 9 / 96
- London Assembly: 11 / 25
- Strategic authority mayors: 10 / 14
- Directly elected local authority mayors: 7 / 13
- Councillors: 4,595 / 18,645
- Councils led: 123 / 369
- PCCs and PFCCs: 16 / 37

Election symbol

Website
- labour.org.uk

The Labour Party, commonly Labour, is a political party in the United Kingdom. It sits on the centre-left of the left–right political spectrum, and has historically been an alliance of democratic socialists, social democrats and trade unionists. It has been the governing party since the 2024 general election. Andy Burnham became Leader of the Labour Party and Prime Minister of the United Kingdom in 2026, succeeding Keir Starmer, who had been elected party leader in 2020 and led Labour into government. There have been 12 Labour governments and eight Labour prime ministers. The party meets annually during Autumn for the Labour Party Conference, during which delegates from local parties and trade unions vote on party policy, and senior figures address the audience from the Conference platform.

The Labour Party was founded in 1900, having emerged from the trade union movement and socialist parties of the 19th century. In 1918 it became guided by socialism and a commitment to "common ownership" via nationalisation. It was electorally weak before the First World War, but in the early 1920s overtook the Liberal Party to become the main opposition to the Conservative Party, and briefly formed a minority government under Ramsay MacDonald in 1924. In 1929 Labour became the largest party in the House of Commons for the first time, with 287 seats, but fell short of a majority, forming another minority government. In 1931, in response to the Great Depression, MacDonald formed a new government with Conservative and Liberal support, which led to his expulsion from the party. Labour was soundly defeated by his coalition in 1931, winning only 52 seats, but began to recover in 1935 with 154 seats.

During the Second World War, Labour served in the wartime coalition, after which it won a majority in 1945 under Clement Attlee. Attlee's government enacted extensive nationalisation and established the modern welfare state and National Health Service before losing power in 1951. Under Harold Wilson and James Callaghan, Labour again governed from 1964 to 1970 and from 1974 to 1979. The party then entered a period of intense internal division, which ended in the defeat of its left wing by the mid-1980s. After electoral defeats to the Conservatives in 1987 and 1992, Tony Blair took the party to the political centre as part of the New Labour rebranding of the party, and it governed under Blair from 1997 to 2007 and Gordon Brown from 2007 to 2010. After several electoral defeats in the 2010s, Starmer moved Labour closer to the political centre after replacing Jeremy Corbyn as its leader in 2020, winning the 2024 general election. On 22 June 2026, Starmer resigned as leader, and was succeeded by Burnham the following month.

The party includes semi-autonomous London, Scottish, Welsh and Northern Irish branches.

== History ==
=== Origins to 1890s ===
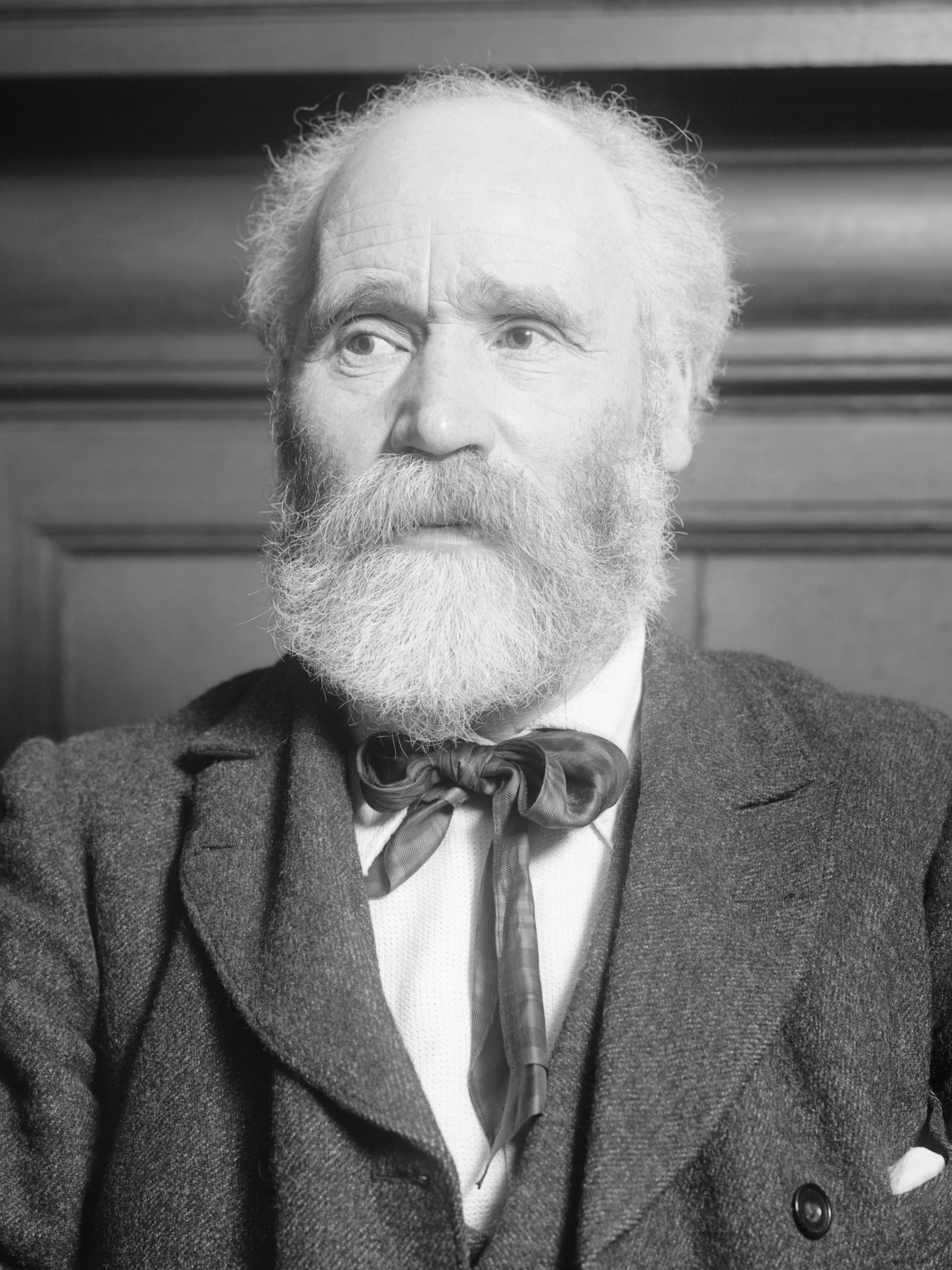
Keir Hardie, first leader of the Labour Party contingent in the House of Commons

The origins of what became the Labour Party emerged in the late 19th century. It represented the interests of the labour unions and more generally the growing urban working class. Hundreds of thousands of workers had recently gained voting rights by laws passed in 1867 and 1884. Many different trade unions flourished in the industrial districts. Their leaders used the Methodist revival tradition to find ways to rally the membership. Several small socialist organisations formed and wanted power based on the working class; the most influential was the Fabian Society, which was made up of middle class reformers. Keir Hardie worked for cooperation among the unions and left-wing groups such as his small Independent Labour Party (ILP).

=== Labour Representation Committee (1900–1906) ===
The Labour Party was formed by unions and left-wing groups to create a distinct political voice for the working class in Britain. In 1900 the Trades Union Congress (TUC), an umbrella body for most unions, sponsored a national conference to unite into a single party that would sponsor candidates for the House of Commons. The conference created the Labour Representation Committee (LRC), as a coalition of separate groups with Ramsay MacDonald as secretary. The fearsome issue for labour was the 1901 Taff Vale legal decision which made most strikes illegal; the urgent goal was to get Parliament to reverse it. The LRC cut a secret deal with the Liberal Party: they would not compete against each other in the 1906 general election. Voters gave the Liberals a landslide with 397 seats out of 664; the new LRC won 29 seats. The LRC renamed itself "The Labour Party", with veteran member of Parliament (MP) Keir Hardie narrowly winning the role of leader of the Parliamentary Labour Party (PLP).

=== Early years (1906–1923) ===
The original Liberty logo, in use until 1983

The Labour Party's first national conference in Belfast in 1907 helped shape many of its key policies. Though it never fully resolved the puzzle of where the final decisions ought to lie, rather, the conference created a "conscience clause" allowing diversity of opinions rather than a rigid orthodoxy. Irish politics proved to be so different that the Party simply quit Ireland and worked only in England, Scotland and Wales. In 1908–1910 the Party supported the momentous and largely successful Liberal battles in favour of a welfare state and against the Unionist/Conservative Party and against the veto power of the House of Lords. Growth continued, with 42 Labour MPs elected to the House of Commons in the December 1910 general election. During World War I, the party experienced internal divisions over support for the war effort, but also saw one of its top leaders Arthur Henderson, serve in the powerful war cabinet.

After the war, the party focused on building a strong constituency-based support network and adopted a comprehensive statement of policies titled "Labour and the New Social Order". In 1918, Clause IV was added to Labour's constitution, making a form of socialism the doctrine of the party and committing Labour to work towards common ownership of the means of production, distribution, and exchange. Although socialism was vaguely promised, there was no effort made to draw up detailed plans on what that would mean or how it could be accomplished.

The Representation of the People Act 1918 greatly expanded the electorate, enfranchising all men and most women. The party concentrated its appeal on the new electorate with considerable success among working men, but far less success among women. As the Liberal Party collapsed, Labour became the official opposition to the Conservative government. Its support for the war effort demonstrated that the Labour Party was a patriotic and moderate force that solved problems and did not threaten class warfare.

=== Labour forms a government (1923–1924) ===
The 1923 election was a pivotal achievement with the formation of the first Labour government. The Conservatives called for high tariffs. Labour and Liberals both wanted free trade. Labour leader Ramsay MacDonald formed a minority government with Liberal support that lasted 10 months. The only domestic achievement was the Wheatley Housing Act, which expanded the large-scale public housing program that started in 1919 with support from all three major parties. MacDonald was much more successful in foreign policy. He helped end the impasse over German payment of reparations by enlisting Washington to launch the Dawes Plan. Much more controversial was his decision to recognise the Soviet Union. That ignited an anti-Communist backlash that exploded four days before the 1924 election in the fake Zinoviev Letter in which Kremlin supposedly called for revolutionary uprising by British workers. The 1924 election saw the Conservatives return to power, benefiting from the Zinoviev letter and the continuing collapse of the Liberal vote. The Labour share of the popular vote went up, but it lost seats. Above all the moderation of the Macdonald government put to rest the lingering fears that a Labour victory would produce a violent class war.

=== The failed general strike (1926–1929) ===
In 1925–26, coal sales fell and the mining companies demanded an increase in hours and a cut in wages. The miners were totally opposed and planned a strike. The TUC coalition of unions decided it would support the miners by a nationwide general strike that would paralyse most of the national economy. A strike was postponed when the Conservative government offered a subsidy for wages, but it also prepared to deal with the threatened general strike. Meanwhile, the TUC failed to make preparations. It ignored the Labour Party in and out of Parliament and in turn party leaders opposed a national strike. The 1926 general strike failed after 9 days as the government plan devised by Winston Churchill proved highly effective in keeping the economy open while minimising violence. In the long run, however, the episode tended to strengthen working class support for Labour, and it gained in the 1929 general election, forming a second government with Liberal help.

=== Second Labour Ministry in 1929 and failures in 1930s ===
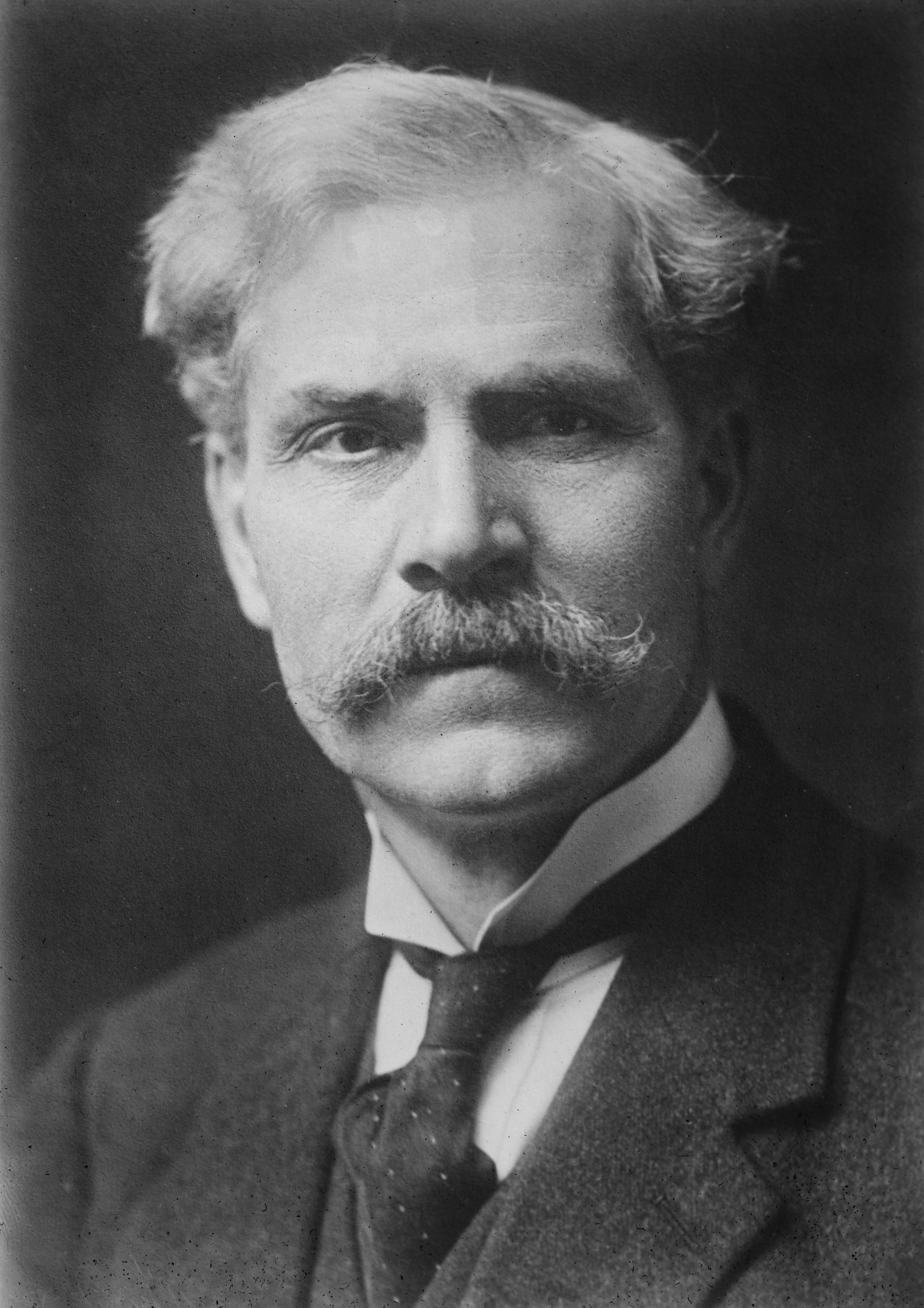
Ramsay MacDonald, first Labour prime minister (1924 and 1929–1931)

Once again with Liberal help, MacDonald became prime minister following the successful 1929 election. There were some promising achievements in foreign policy, notably the Young Plan that seemed to resolve the issue of German reparations, and the London Naval Treaty of 1930 that limited submarine construction. Some minor legislation was passed, notably a noncontroversial expansion of new public housing. Overnight in October 1929 the world economy plunged into the Great Depression, and no party had an answer as tax revenue plunged, unemployment doubled to 2.5 million (in late 1930), prices fell, and government spending on unemployment benefits soared. Conditions became much worse in 1931 as the banks became unable to loan the government enough to cover the growing deficit. In an era before Keynesian economics, the strong consensus among experts was for the government to balance its budget.

Spending was cut again and again but MacDonald and his Chancellor of the Exchequer Philip Snowden argued that the only way to get an emergency loan from New York banks was to cut unemployment benefits by 10%. They pointed out that cost of food was down 15% and overall prices were down 10%. But in the cabinet most Labour members were vehemently opposed—they demanded new taxes on the rich instead. MacDonald gave up and on 23 August went to King George V and resigned the government. Unexpectedly the monarch insisted that the only patriotic solution was for MacDonald to stay and form an all-party "national government" with the Conservatives, which he did the next day. The Labour Party felt betrayed and expelled MacDonald and Snowden. The new National Government, 1931–1935 kept Macdonald and Snowden and two others, replacing the rest of the Laborites with Conservatives. The 1931 election took place on 27 October. Labour had 6.3 million votes (31 per cent), down from 8.0 million and 37 per cent in 1929. Nevertheless, it was reduced to a helpless minority of only 52 members, chiefly from coal mining districts. The old leadership was gone. One bright note came in 1934 when Herbert Morrison led Labour to take control of the London County Council for the first time ever.

In the 1935 election, Labour recovered to 8.0 million votes (38 per cent), and Clement Attlee became Minority Leader. The Party now had 154 seats but had minimal influence in Parliament. At the local level union leaders, led by Ernest Bevin, successfully defeated Communist infiltration. In foreign policy a strong pacifist element made it slow to support the government's rearmament program. As the threat from Nazi Germany escalated, the Party gradually abandoned its pacifist stance and came to support re-armament, largely due to the efforts of Bevin and Hugh Dalton. By 1937 they had persuaded the Party to oppose Neville Chamberlain's policy of appeasement of Nazi Germany and Fascist Italy. However, as late as April 1939 the Party strongly opposed conscription for the Army.

=== Wartime coalition (1940–1945) ===
The party returned to power in May 1940, with about a third of the seats in the wartime coalition government under Churchill. Attlee was given a new position as Deputy Prime Minister. He was in charge of the cabinet when Churchill was absent, and handled domestic affairs, working closely with Bevin as Minister of Labour. The war set in motion profound demands for reform. This mood was epitomised in the Beveridge Report of 1942, by the Liberal economist William Beveridge. The Report assumed that the maintenance of full employment would be the aim of post-war governments, and that this would provide the basis for the welfare state. Immediately upon its release, it sold hundreds of thousands of copies. All major parties committed themselves to fulfilling this aim, but the Labour Party was seen by the electorate as the party most likely to follow it through.

=== Attlee government (1945–1951) ===
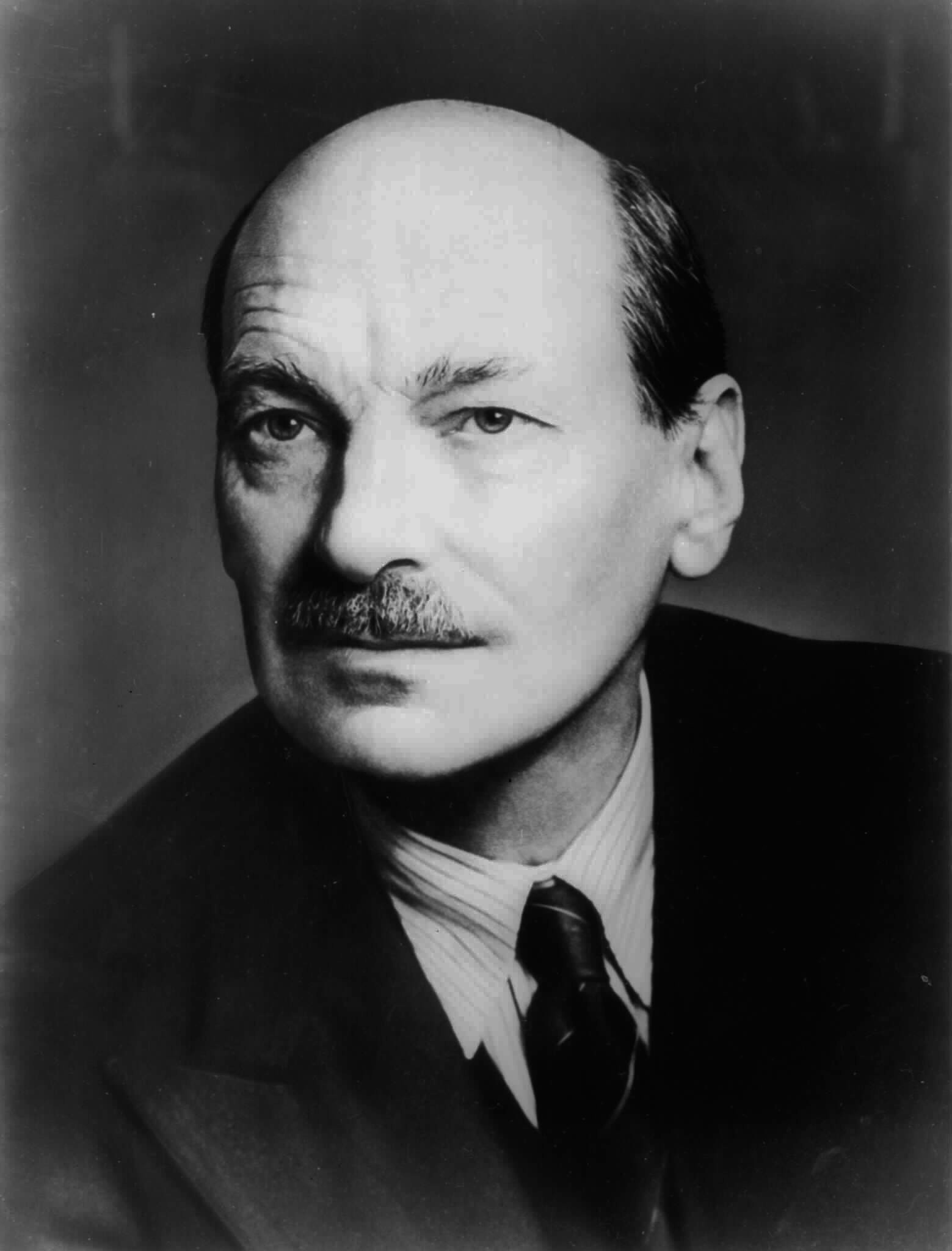
Clement Attlee, Prime Minister (1945–1951)

With the victory in Europe, the coalition broke up in May 1945. The 1945 general election gave Labour a landslide victory, as they won 12 million votes (50% of the total) and 393 seats. The Labour government proved the most radical in British history. It presided over a policy of nationalising major industries and utilities including the Bank of England, coal mining, the steel industry, electricity, gas and inland transport (including railways, road haulage and canals). It developed and implemented the "cradle to grave" welfare state. It created the National Health Service (NHS), which gave publicly funded medical treatment for all.

Nationalisation primarily affected weak and poorly managed industries, opening the hope that centralised planning would reverse the decline. Iron and steel, however, were already well-run and nationalisation was denounced and later reversed by the Conservatives.

The economy was precarious during the age of austerity, as wartime restrictions and rationing continued, and the wartime bombing damage was slowly being rebuilt at great cost. The Treasury depended heavily on American money, especially the 1946 loan of $3.75 billion at a low 2% interest rate, and the gift of $2.694 billion in Marshall Plan funds. Canada also provided gifts and $1.25 billion in loans.

The government began the process of dismantling the British Empire, starting with independence to India and Pakistan in 1947, followed by Burma (Myanmar) and Ceylon (Sri Lanka) the following year. It relinquished its control over Palestine to the United Nations in 1948. Elsewhere independence movements were much weaker and London's policy was to keep the Empire in business.

Under Ernest Bevin's leadership, London pushed Washington into an anti-Communist coalition that launched the Cold War in 1947 and established the NATO military alliance against the USSR in 1949. Furthermore, independent of Washington London committed large sums to developing a secret nuclear weapons programme.

In the 1951 general election, Labour narrowly lost to Churchill's Conservatives, despite receiving the larger share of the popular vote. Its 13.9 million vote total was the highest ever. Most of its innovation were accepted by the Conservatives and Liberals and became part of the "post-war consensus" that lasted until the Thatcher era of the 1980s.

=== Internal feuds (1951–1964) ===
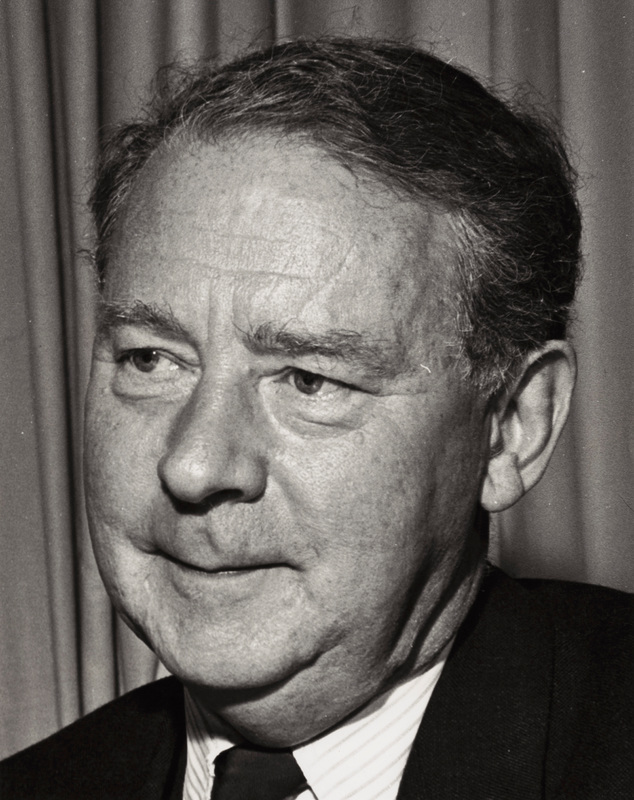
Hugh Gaitskell, Leader of the Opposition (1955–1963)

Labour spent 13 years in opposition. It suffered an ideological split, between the left-wing followers of Aneurin Bevan (known as Bevanites) and the right-wing following Hugh Gaitskell (known as Gaitskellites). The economy recovered as Conservatives hung together and chanted, "You Never Had It So Good.". The ageing Attlee contested the general election in 1955, which saw Labour lose ground; he retired and was replaced by Gaitskell. Internal squabbling now focused on the issues of nuclear disarmament, Britain's entry into the European Economic Community (EEC), and Clause IV of the Labour Party Constitution, with its commitment to nationalisation. Gaitskell led Labour to a third consecutive defeat at the 1959 general election despite the party appearing more united than it had been for some time. Gaitskell responded by attempting to remove Clause IV (the nationalisation clause) from the party constitution, but this was unsuccessful. Gaitskell died suddenly in 1963, and cleared the way for Harold Wilson to lead the party.

=== Wilson as leader (1964–1974) ===
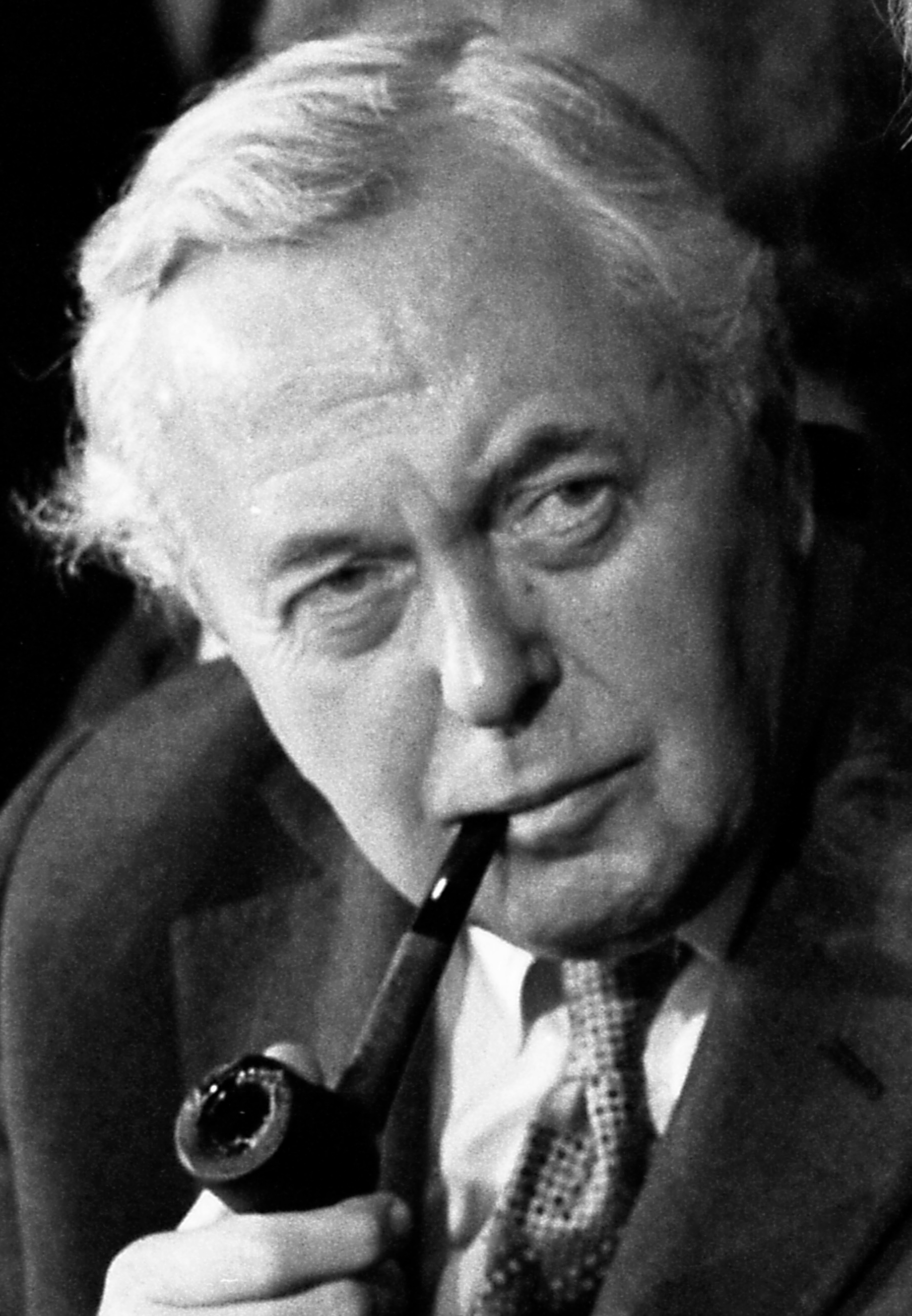
Harold Wilson, Prime Minister (1964–1970 and 1974–1976)

A downturn in the economy and a series of scandals in the early 1960s had engulfed the Conservative government by 1963. The Labour Party returned to government with a 4-seat majority under Wilson in the 1964 general election but a landslide increased its majority to 96 in the 1966 general election.

Labour was responsible for a number of sweeping social and cultural reforms mostly under the leadership of Home Secretary Roy Jenkins such as the abolition of the death penalty; the legalisation of abortion; loosening restrictions on homosexuality, the abolition of theatre censorship, and legislation to outlaw racial discrimination

The government put heavy emphasis on expanding opportunities through education: Comprehensive education was expanded at the secondary level and the Open University created for adults.

Wilson's first period as Prime Minister coincided with a period of relatively low unemployment and economic prosperity, it was however hindered by significant problems with a large trade deficit which it had inherited from the previous government. The first three years of the government were spent in an ultimately doomed attempt to stave off the continued devaluation of the pound. Labour went on to unexpectedly lose the 1970 general election to the Conservatives under Edward Heath. Labour in opposition kept Wilson as Leader. The 1970s proved a difficult time to be in government for both the Conservatives and Labour due to the 1973 oil crisis, which caused high inflation and a global recession. The Labour Party was returned to power again under Wilson a few days after the February 1974 general election, forming a minority government with the support of the Ulster Unionists. In a bid to gain a majority, Prime Minister Wilson soon called an election for October 1974. Labour won a slim majority of three, gaining 18 seats taking its total to 319.

=== Majority to minority (1974–1979) ===
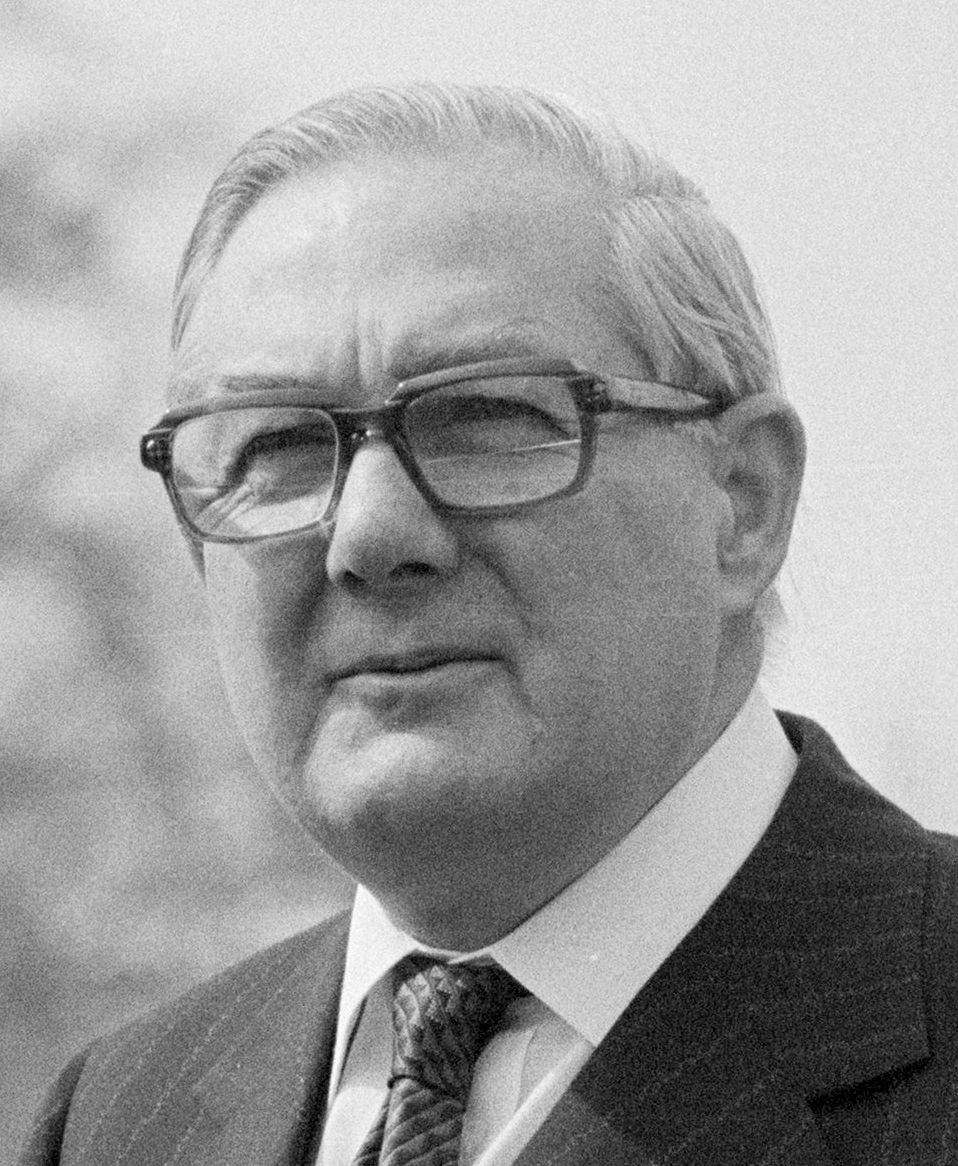
James Callaghan, Prime Minister (1976–1979)

In March 1974 Wilson was appointed prime minister for a second time; he called a snap election in October 1974, which gave Labour a small majority. During his second tenure as prime minister, Wilson oversaw the referendum that confirmed the UK's membership of the European Communities.

When Wilson suddenly announced his retirement in March 1976, Callaghan defeated five other candidates to be elected Leader of the Labour Party; he was appointed prime minister on 5 April 1976. By now Labour had lost its narrow majority. To stay in power Callaghan made a confidence and supply agreement with the Liberal Party. While this initially proved stable, it could not survive in the face of major industrial disputes and widespread strikes in the 1978–79 "Winter of Discontent", as well as the defeat of the referendum on devolution for Scotland. Minor parties joined the Conservatives to pass a motion of no-confidence in Callaghan on 28 March 1979. Callaghan led Labour to defeat at the 1979 election and was replaced by Conservative Margaret Thatcher. The 1979 defeat marked the beginning of 18 years in opposition for the Labour Party, the longest in its history. According to historian Kenneth O. Morgan, the fall of Callaghan meant the passing of an old obsolete system, as well as the end of corporatism, Keynesian spending programmes, subsidised welfare payments, and labour union power.

=== Thatcherism and Labour's civil war (1979–1992) ===
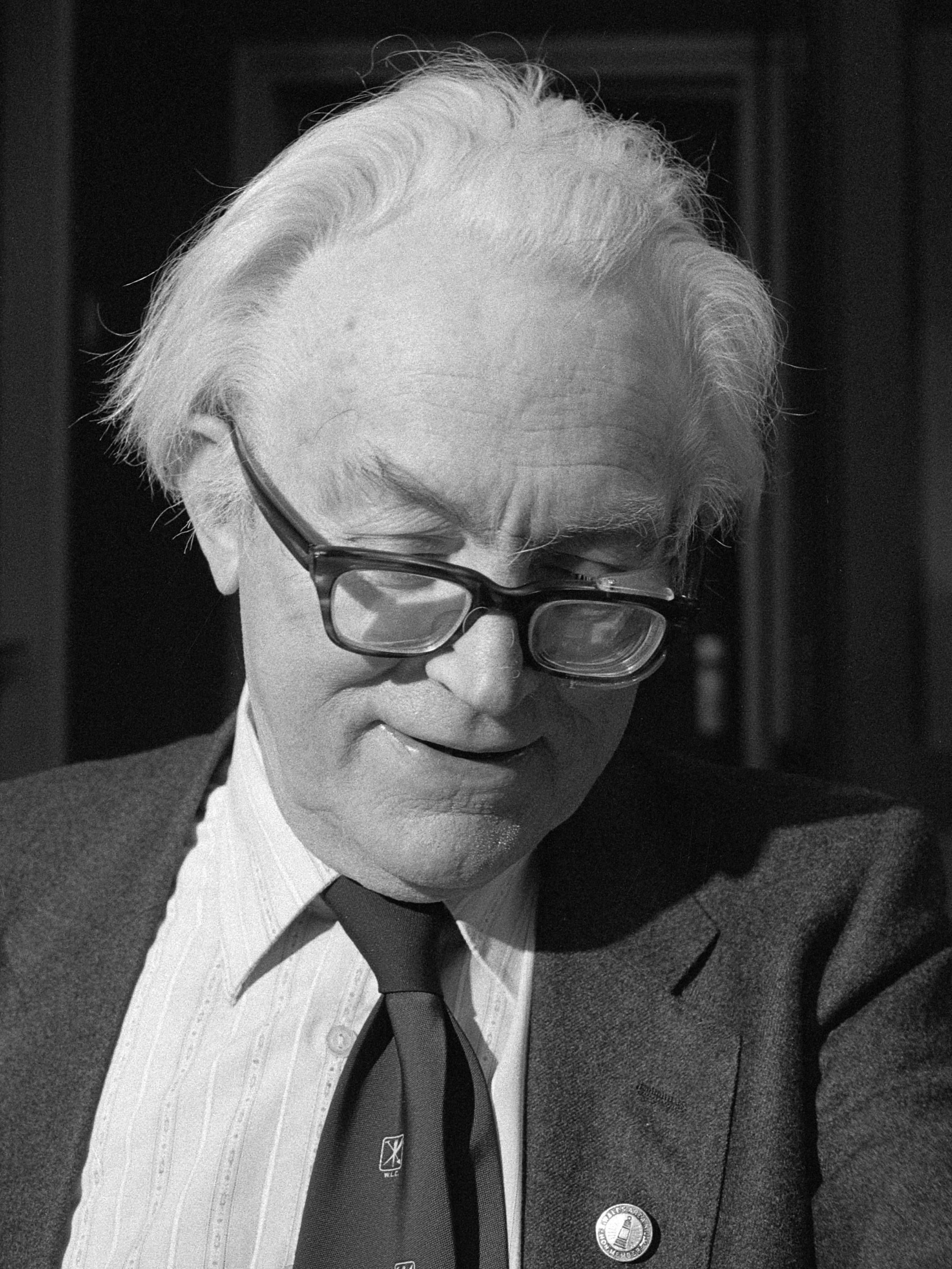
Michael Foot, Leader of the Opposition (1980–1983)

The Red Flag symbol used by the party during the 1966 general election and as the official logotype from 1980 to 1987

Following 1979, the Labour Party found itself overwhelmed by the Conservative government led by hardliner Margaret Thatcher. From the right, she largely rejected the post-war consensus on economic and social policies that had bipartisan support since the 1950s. At first Thatcher's economic reforms were received poorly. Argentina's invasion of a British possession in the Falklands War in Spring 1982 transformed British politics. Thatcher's aggressive reaction produced a quick victory and national elation, leading the Conservatives to a landslide victory in the 1983 general election. Thatcher's successful attacks on labour unions in 1984–1985 further weakened the Labour base. It took a decade for Labour to recover.

Labour's inward turn flared into a civil war between left and right. The party came under the control of left-wing activists in the local constituencies. The left was led by Michael Foot and Tony Benn. The 1983 election manifesto, entitled "The New Hope for Britain", called for extensive nationalisation of industry, with heavily centralised economic planning, and many additional controls on business. It demanded unilateral nuclear disarmament and withdrawal from the European Community. The manifesto was ridiculed by political opponents as "longest suicide note in history" and was alleged to have alienated moderate voters. Some prominent party centrists, led by a group of MPs dubbed the "Gang of Four", quit the Labour Party to form the Social Democratic Party, but it ultimately formed an electoral pact with the Liberal Party rather than contest elections independently. After Labour's massive defeat in the 1983 general election, Neil Kinnock replaced Foot. He defeated the left wing, reversed the controversial manifesto proposals, expelled radical factions like the Trotskyist Militant tendency, and began a process of modernisation and acceptance of many Thatcherite reforms.

=== Modernisers take charge (1992–1997) ===
Kenneth Morgan states, "In 1992, the party presented itself as a modern social democratic party; its communication's officer, Peter Mandelson, ensured that the red flag image would disappear, with the party's new symbol being the gentle emblem of the red rose. This was the party's logo from 1987 to 2007.

In November 1990, Thatcher resigned and was succeeded by the less confrontational Thatcherite John Major. Opinion polls had shown Labour comfortably ahead of the Conservatives largely because of Thatcher's introduction of the highly unpopular poll tax, combined with the fact that the economy was sliding into recession. Major replaced the poll tax but Kinnock energised Labour with the theme "It's Time for a Change", after more than a decade of unbroken Conservative rule. The 1992 general election gave Conservatives a victory with a much-reduced majority of 21. It was a deeply disappointing result for Labour. For the first time in over 30 years there was serious doubt among the public and the media as to whether Labour could ever return to government. Kinnock resigned as leader and was succeeded by John Smith.

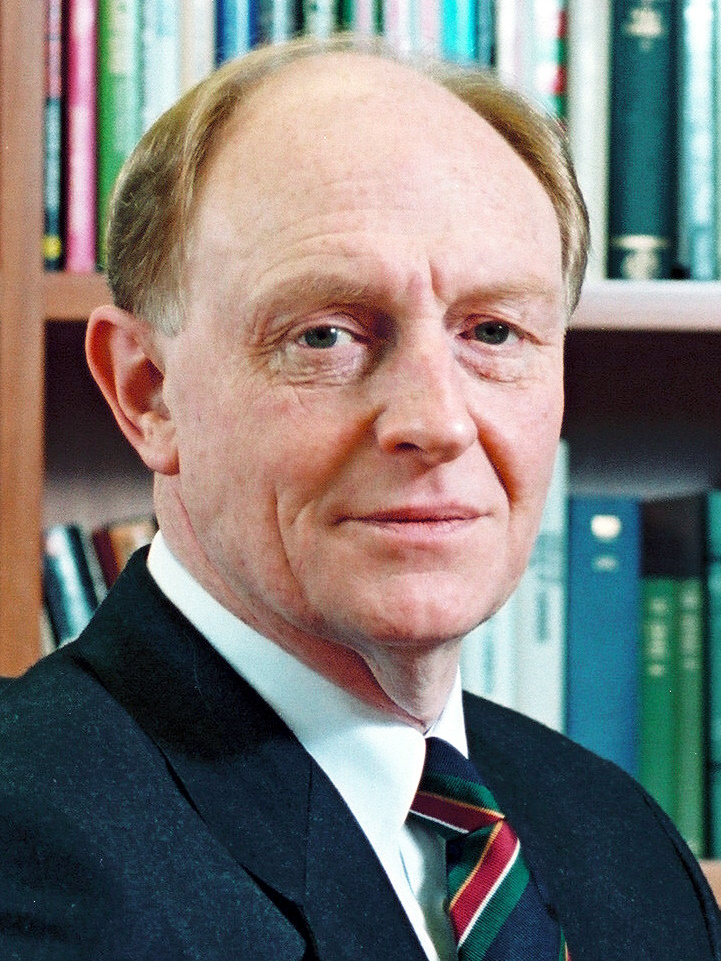
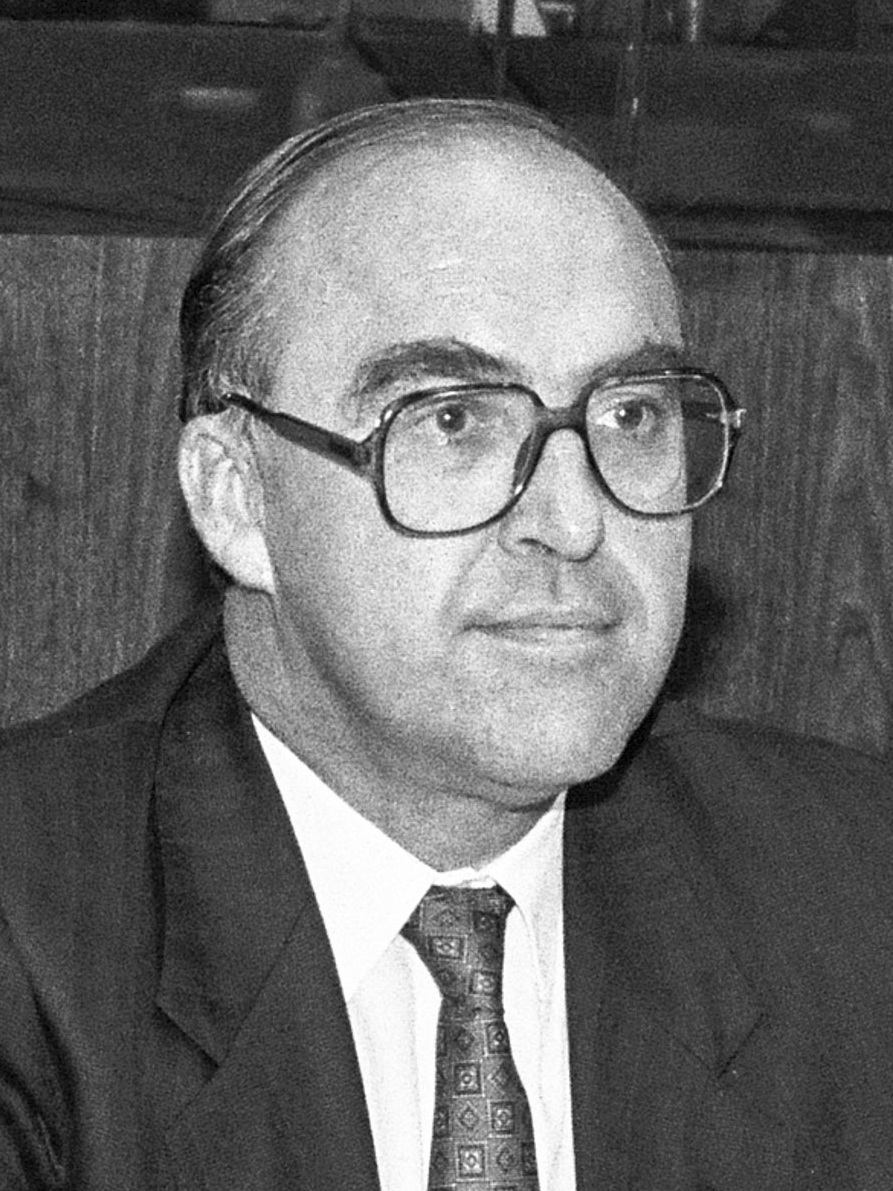
Labour was led by Neil Kinnock (1983–1992) and John Smith (1992-1994)

The damage to the economy on Black Wednesday in September 1992 undermined the Conservative reputation for superior economic competence. By December, Labour had a comfortable lead in the opinion polls. The recession ended in early 1993 and was followed by a sharp fall in unemployment, together with sustained economic growth. Nevertheless, the Labour lead in the polls remained strong. Smith died suddenly in May 1994, and Tony Blair became leader.

Once again the battle resumed between the old guard on the left and the younger "modernisers". The old guard argued that they were regaining strength under Smith's strong leadership. Blair, the leader of the modernisers, warned that the long-term weaknesses had to be reversed. He argued that the party was too locked into a base that was shrinking, since it was based on the working-class, on trade unions and on residents of subsidised council housing. Blair said that the rapidly growing middle class was largely ignored, as well as more ambitious working-class families. He argued that they aspired to become middle-class and accepted the Conservative argument that traditional Labour was holding ambitious people back with higher tax policies. To present a fresh face and new policies to the electorate, New Labour needed more than fresh leaders; it had to jettison outdated policies, argued the modernisers. Calling on the slogan, "One Member, One Vote" Blair defeated the union element and ended block voting by leaders of labour unions. Blair and the modernisers called for radical adjustment of Party goals by repealing "Clause IV", the historic commitment to nationalisation of industry. This was achieved in 1995.

=== New Labour (1994–2010) ===
New Labour logo

Blair continued to move the party further to the centre, abandoning the largely symbolic Clause Four at the 1995 mini-conference in a strategy to increase the party's appeal to "middle England". The political philosophy of New Labour was influenced by the party's development of Anthony Giddens' Third Way which attempted to provide a synthesis between capitalism and socialism.

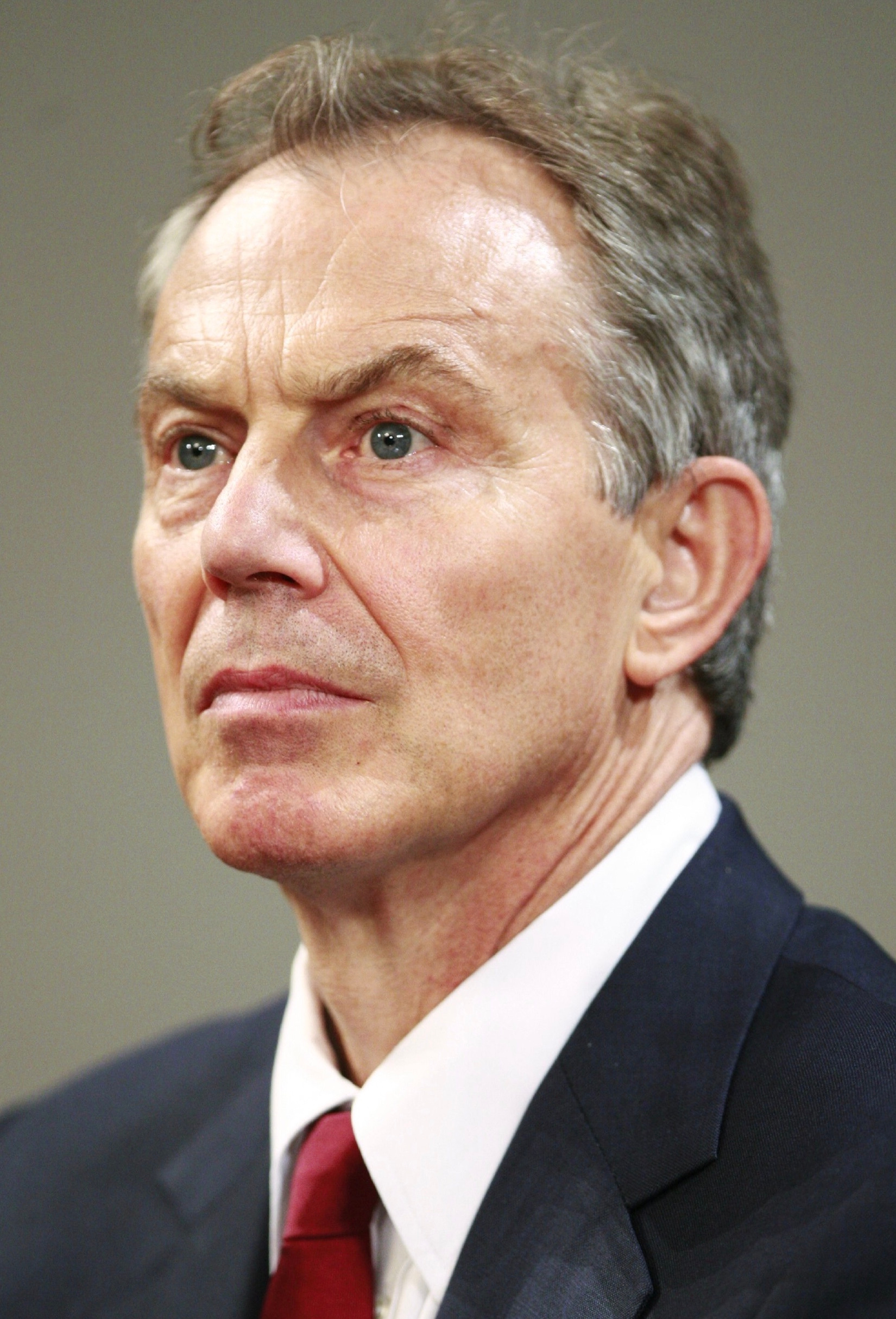
Tony Blair, Prime Minister (1997–2007)

New Labour was first termed as an alternative branding for the Labour Party, dating from a conference slogan first used by the Labour Party in 1994, which was later seen in a draft manifesto published by the party in 1996, called New Labour, New Life For Britain. It was a continuation of the trend that had begun under the leadership of Neil Kinnock. New Labour as a name has no official status, but remains in common use to distinguish modernisers from those holding to more traditional positions, normally referred to as "Old Labour".

New Labour is a party of ideas and ideals but not of outdated ideology. What counts is what works. The objectives are radical. The means will be modern.

The Labour Party won the 1997 general election in a landslide victory with a parliamentary majority of 179; it was the largest ever Labour majority, and at the time the largest swing to a political party achieved since 1945. Over the next decade, a wide range of progressive social reforms were enacted, with millions lifted out of poverty during Labour's time in office largely as a result of various tax and benefit reforms.

Among the early acts of Blair's government were the establishment of the national minimum wage, the devolution of power to Scotland, Wales and Northern Ireland, major changes to the regulation of the banking system and the re-creation of a citywide government body for London, the Greater London Authority, with its own elected-Mayor. Combined with a Conservative opposition that had yet to organise effectively under William Hague, and the continuing popularity of Blair, Labour went on to win the 2001 election with a similar majority, dubbed the "quiet landslide" by the media. In 2003 Labour introduced tax credits, government top-ups to the pay of low-wage workers.

A perceived turning point was when Blair controversially allied himself with US President George W. Bush in supporting the Iraq War, which caused him to lose much of his political support. The UN Secretary-General, among many, considered the war illegal and a violation of the UN Charter. The Iraq War was deeply unpopular in most western countries, with Western governments divided in their support and under pressure from worldwide popular protests. The decisions that led up to the Iraq war and its subsequent conduct were the subject of the Iraq Inquiry.

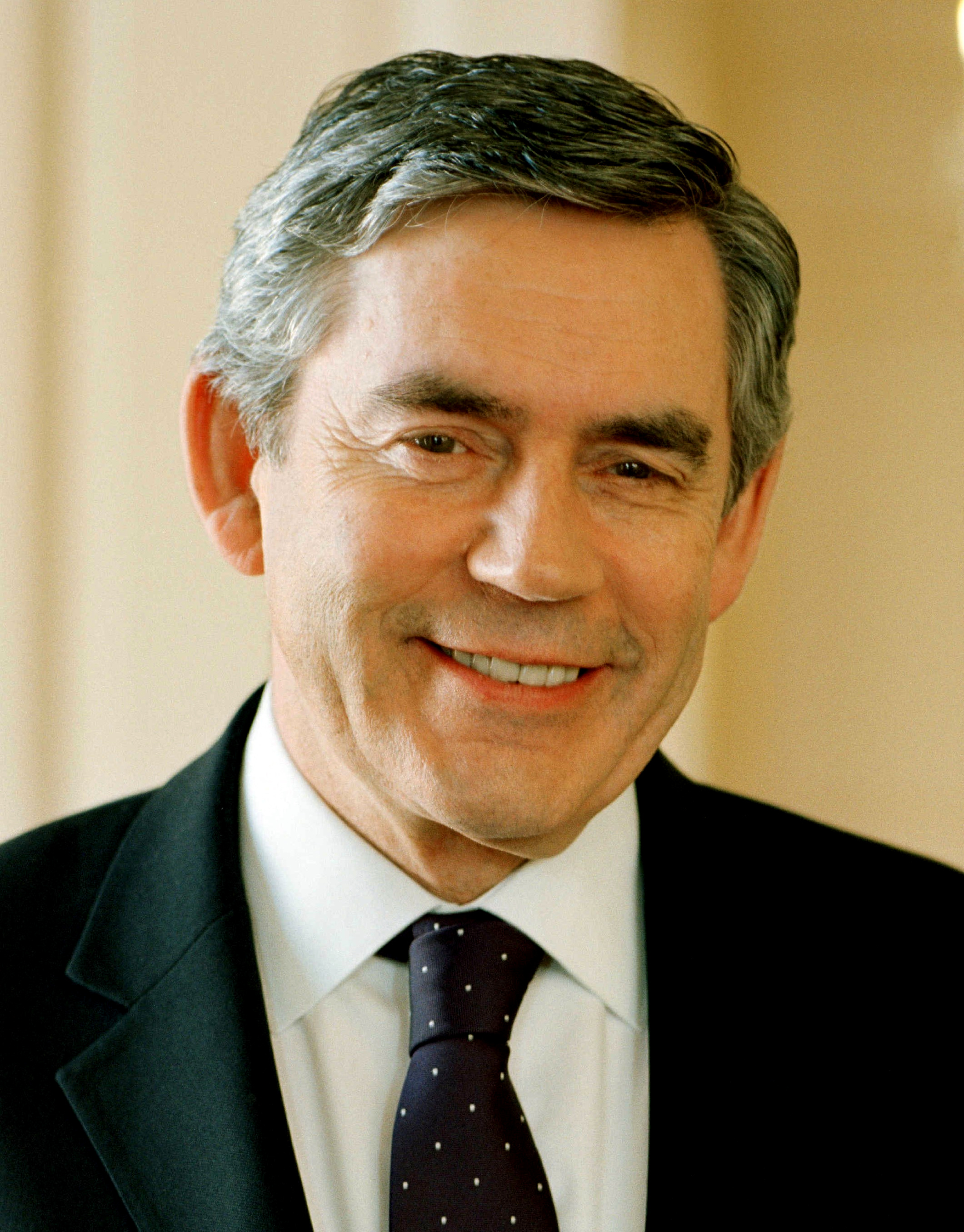
Gordon Brown, Prime Minister (2007–2010)

In the 2005 general election, Labour was re-elected for a third term, but with a reduced majority of 66 and popular vote of only 35.2%. Blair announced in September 2006 that he would step down as leader within the year, though he had been under pressure to quit earlier than May 2007 in order to get a new leader in place before the May elections which were expected to be disastrous for Labour. In the event, the party did lose power in Scotland to a minority Scottish National Party government at the 2007 elections and, shortly after this, Blair resigned as Prime Minister and was replaced by the Chancellor, Gordon Brown. Brown coordinated the UK's response to the 2008 financial crisis. Membership of the party also reached a low, falling to 156,205 by the end of 2009: over 40 per cent of the 405,000 peak reached in 1997, and thought to be the lowest total since the party was founded.

In the 2010 general election on 6 May that year, Labour with 29.0% of the vote won the second largest number of seats (258). The Conservatives with 36.5% of the vote won the largest number of seats (307), but no party had an overall majority, meaning that Labour could still remain in power if they managed to form a coalition with at least one smaller party. However, the Labour Party would have had to form a coalition with more than one other smaller party to gain an overall majority; anything less would result in a minority government. On 10 May 2010, after talks to form a coalition with the Liberal Democrats broke down, Brown announced his intention to stand down as Leader before the Labour Party Conference but a day later resigned as both Prime Minister and party leader.

=== Opposition (2010–2024) ===
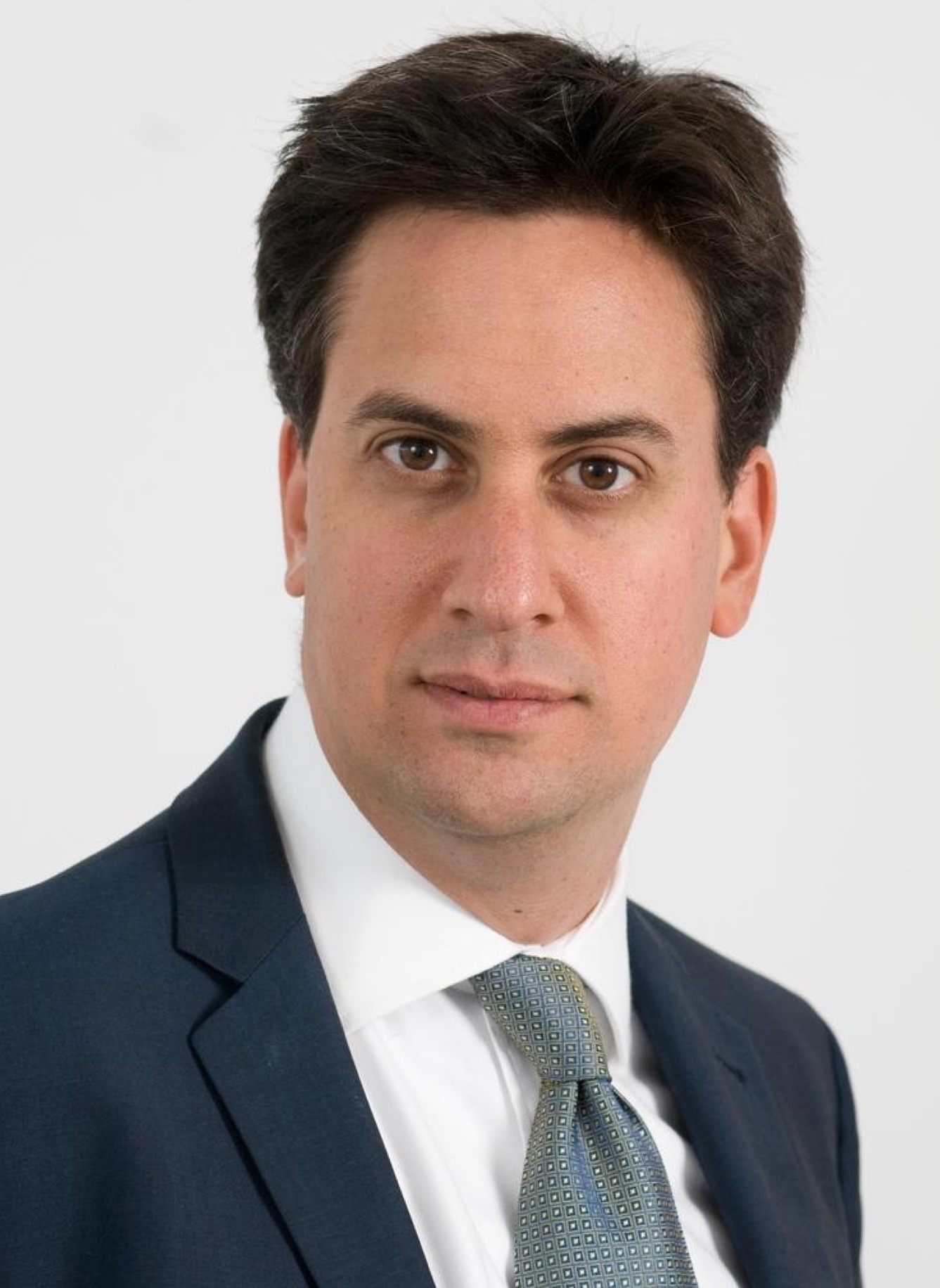
Ed Miliband, Leader of the Opposition (2010–2015)

Ed Miliband won the subsequent leadership election. Miliband emphasised "responsible capitalism" and greater state intervention to rebalance the economy away from financial services. He advocated for more regulation of banks and energy companies and often addressed the need to challenge vested interests and increase inclusivity in British society. He adopted the "One Nation Labour" branding in 2012. The Parliamentary Labour Party voted to abolish Shadow Cabinet elections in 2011, ratified by the National Executive Committee and Party Conference. Henceforth the leader of the party chose the Shadow Cabinet members.

In March 2014, the party reformed internal election procedures, including replacing the electoral college system with "one member, one vote". Mass membership was encouraged by creating a class of "registered supporters" as an alternative to full membership. Trade union members would also have to explicitly opt in rather than opt out of paying a political levy to the party.

In September 2014, Labour outlined plans to cut the government's current account deficit and balance the budget by 2020, excluding investment. The party carried these plans into the 2015 general election, which Labour lost. Its representation fell to 232 seats in the House of Commons. The party lost 40 of its 41 seats in Scotland to the Scottish National Party.

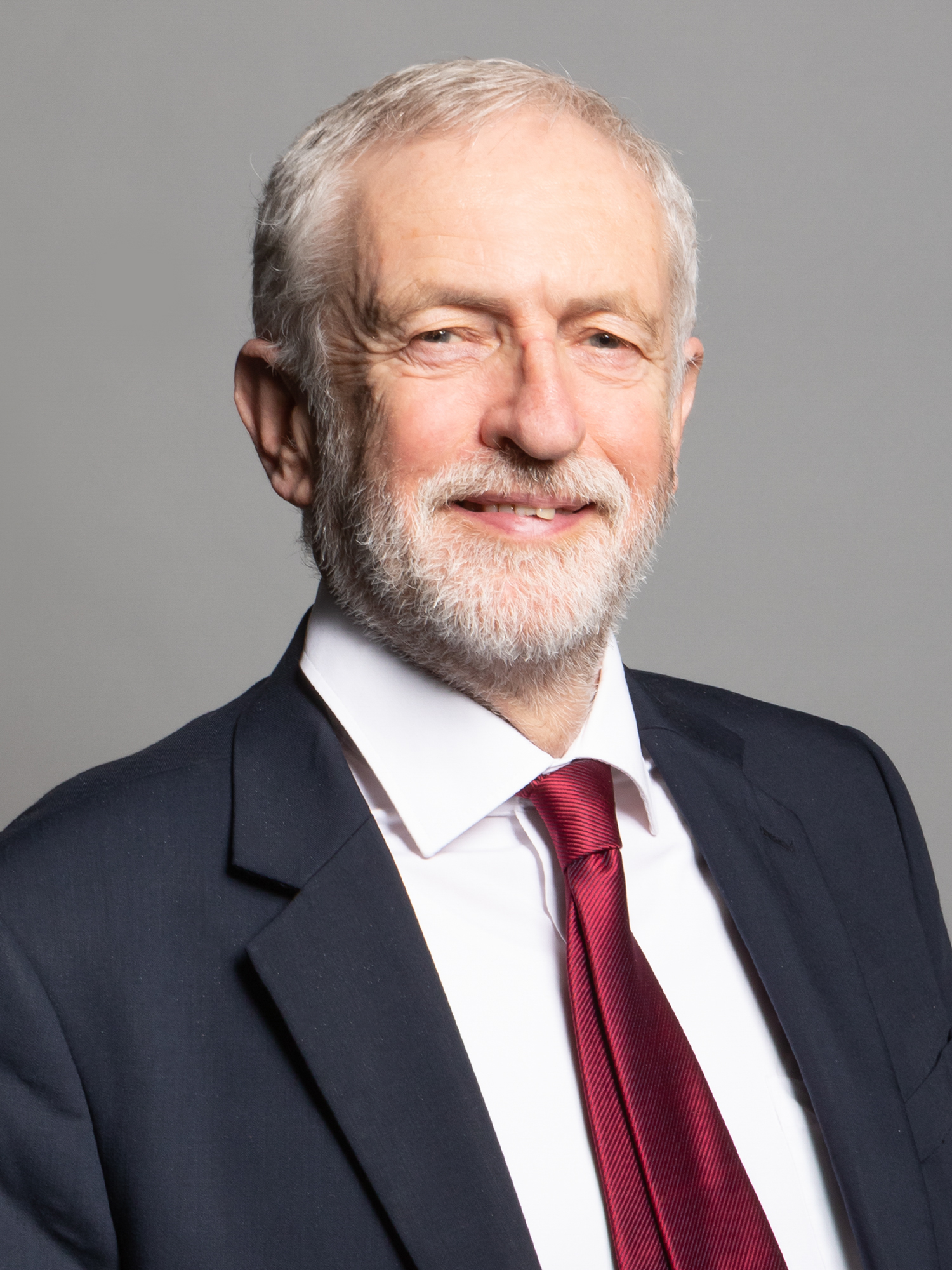
Jeremy Corbyn, Leader of the Opposition (2015–2020)

After the 2015 general election, Miliband resigned as party leader and Harriet Harman again became interim leader. Labour held a leadership election in which Jeremy Corbyn, then a member of the Socialist Campaign Group, was considered a fringe candidate when the contest began, receiving nominations from just 36 MPs, one more than the minimum required to stand, and the support of just 16 MPs. The Labour Party saw a flood of membership applications during the leadership election, with most of the new members thought to be Corbyn supporters. Corbyn was elected leader with 60% of the vote. Membership continued to climb after his victory; one year later it had grown to more than 500,000, making it the largest political party in Western Europe.

Tensions soon developed in the parliamentary party over Corbyn's leadership, particularly after the 2016 Brexit referendum. Many in the party were angered that Corbyn did not campaign strongly against Brexit; he had been only a "lukewarm" supporter of remaining in the European Union and refused to join David Cameron in campaigning for the Remain side. 21 members of the Shadow Cabinet resigned after the referendum. Corbyn lost a no-confidence vote among Labour MPs by 172–40, triggering a leadership election, which he won decisively with 62% support among Labour party members.

In April 2017, Prime Minister Theresa May called a snap election for June 2017. Corbyn resisted pressure from within the Labour Party to call for a referendum on the eventual Brexit deal, instead focusing on healthcare, education and ending austerity. Although Labour started the campaign as far as 20 points behind, it defied expectations by gaining 40% of the vote, its greatest share since 2001 and the biggest increase in vote share in a single general election since 1945. The party gained a net 30 seats with the Conservatives losing their overall majority.

From 2016, the Labour Party faced criticism for failing to deal with antisemitism. Criticism was also levelled at Corbyn. The Chakrabarti Inquiry cleared the party of widespread antisemitism, but identified an "occasionally toxic atmosphere". High-profile party members, including Ken Livingstone, Peter Willsman and Chris Williamson, left the party or were suspended over antisemitism-related incidents. In 2018, internal divisions emerged over adopting the IHRA Working Definition of Antisemitism, with those opposed arguing the definition limits free speech including criticism of the state of Israel. 68 rabbis criticised the leadership for its stance. The issue was cited by a number of Labour MPs who left the party to create Change UK, a new political party made up of ex-Conservative and ex-Labour MPs.

In the 2019 general election, Labour campaigned on a manifesto widely considered the most radical in decades, more closely resembling Labour's politics of the 1970s. These included plans to nationalise the country's biggest energy firms, the National Grid, the water industry, Royal Mail, the railways and the broadband arm of BT. The election saw Labour win its lowest number of seats since 1935. Following Labour's defeat in the 2019 general election, Corbyn announced that he would stand down as leader.

In 2020, a report by the Equalities and Human Rights Commission found the party responsible for three Equality Act breaches, including harassment and political interference in antisemitism complaints, but did not directly implicate Corbyn. In response, Corbyn said "One antisemite is one too many, but the scale of the problem was also dramatically overstated for political reasons by our opponents inside and outside the party, as well as by much of the media." The Forde Report concluded allegations of antisemitism were weaponised by opponents of Corbyn and that hostility towards Corbyn inside the party from his opponents contributed to the party’s ineffective handling of antisemitism complaints and undermined the party’s leader and election campaigns.

=== Return to government (2024–present) ===
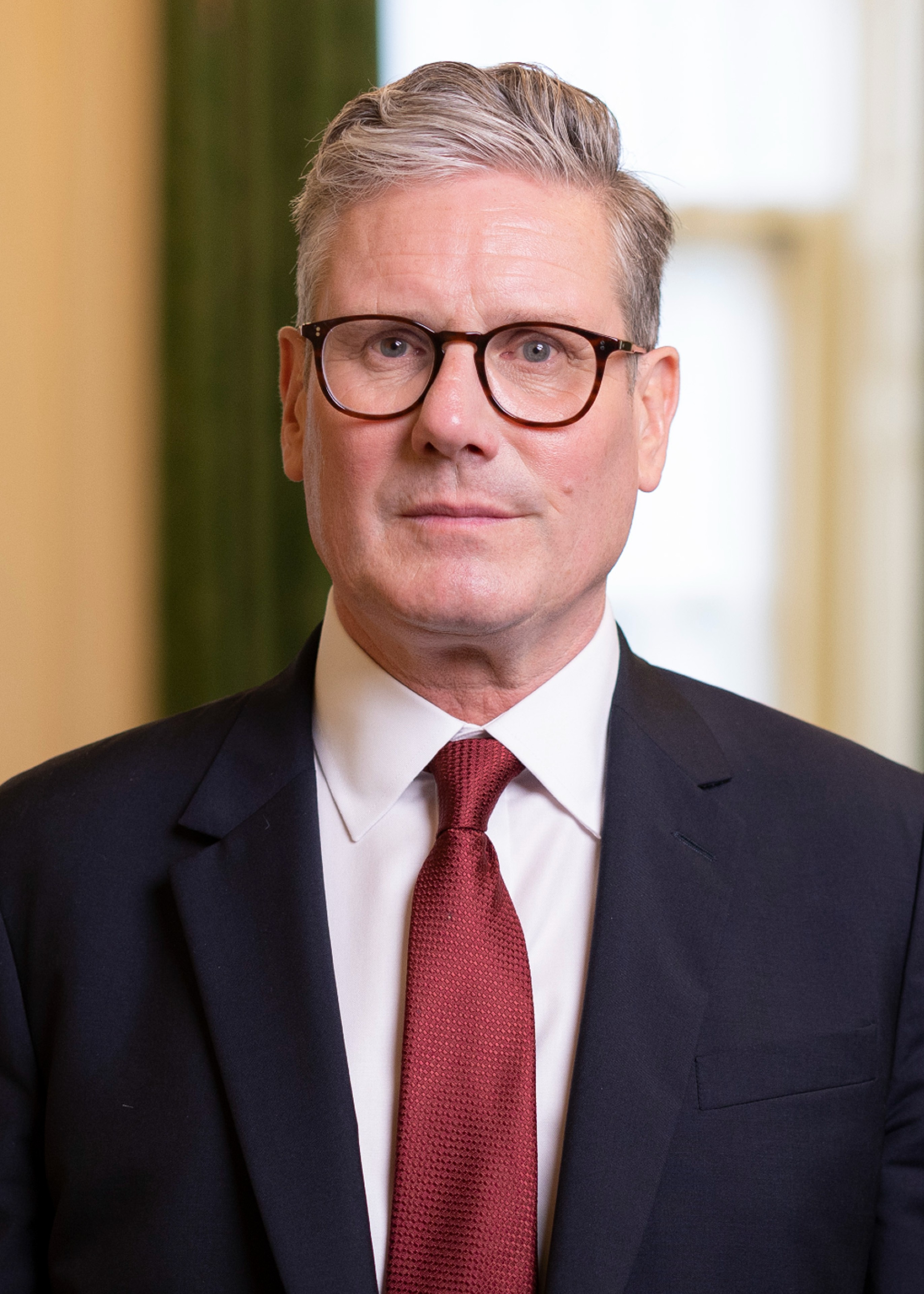
Keir Starmer, Prime Minister (2024–2026)

On 4 April 2020, Keir Starmer was elected as Leader of the Labour Party amidst the COVID-19 pandemic. During his tenure as opposition leader, Starmer repositioned the party from the left toward the political centre, and emphasised the importance of eliminating antisemitism within the party. In October 2020, he suspended former leader Corbyn over his response to the EHRC report on antisemitism, and was never readmitted until he was formally expelled in 2024 after he announced his intention to run in his constituency as an independent candidate.

Following a period of significant political turmoil within the national Conservative government, Labour won the highest gains of the 2023 and 2024 local elections. In 2023, Starmer set out five missions for a future government, targeting issues such as economic growth, health, clean energy, crime and education. Starmer's allies sought to get Starmer supporting parliamentary candidates selected for winnable seats, sometimes characterised as a purge of leftwingers. About 100 candidates had not been selected when the election was called, so were chosen by a NEC panel rather than by local CLPs.

During the 2024 general election campaign, Labour maintained a strong poll lead. Its manifesto focused on economic growth, planning system reform, infrastructure, clean energy, healthcare, education, childcare, constitutional reform, and strengthening workers' rights. It pledged a new publicly owned energy company to achieve net zero emissions, reducing NHS waiting times and "rebuilding the NHS", reforming public services, and public ownership of railway and local bus services.

Starmer led Labour to a landslide victory with a majority of 174 and a popular vote share of 33.7%, ending 14 years of Conservative government with Labour becoming the largest party in the House of Commons. However, the Labour Party also lost five seats to independent candidates, including Jeremy Corbyn, driven by the party's relatively pro-Israel stance during the Gaza war. They also lost one seat to the Conservative Party and one seat to the Green Party. Starmer succeeded Rishi Sunak as prime minister on 5 July 2024, becoming the first Labour prime minister since Gordon Brown in 2010 and the first one to win a general election since Tony Blair in 2005. One of Starmer's first cabinet appointments was Rachel Reeves as Chancellor, which made her the first woman to hold the office. The 2024 State Opening of Parliament outlined 39 pieces of legislation that Labour proposed, including bills to renationalise the railways, strengthen workers' rights, and to give areas of England devolution powers.

On 1 May 2025, the first local elections of Starmer's premiership were held, which saw losses across England from 2021. MPs and councillors representing various sections of the party expressed criticism of unpopular actions taken by the government. A Labour mayor was elected in the West of England election. In November 2025, the government announced a series of measures intended to reduce irregular migration.

Opinion polls showed satisfaction with the Labour government and Starmer declining, and in September 2025 Ipsos indicated that Starmer was the most unpopular prime minister since Ipsos's records began in 1977, with 77% of the public dissatisfied with Starmer's job performance, and Reform UK holding a +12 points voting intention lead over Labour. In the February 2026 Gorton and Denton by-election the Green Party gained the seat from Labour who had held the seat in that area since 1931, which BBC elections analyst John Curtice described as "seismic" and of historic impact.

In the 2026 local elections, Labour lost control of 38 councils. Dissatisfaction with Labour's results and discontent over policy and personnel issues led to calls for Starmer to resign as leader. On 14 May, Labour MP Josh Simons announced his resignation as Member of Parliament, triggering the 2026 Makerfield by-election so that the Mayor of Greater Manchester Andy Burnham could return to parliament and stand for the Labour leadership. Burnham won 54.8% of the vote, increasing Labour's majority in Makerfield to 9,231 votes, compared with Josh Simons' 5,399 vote majority over Reform UK at the 2024 general election.

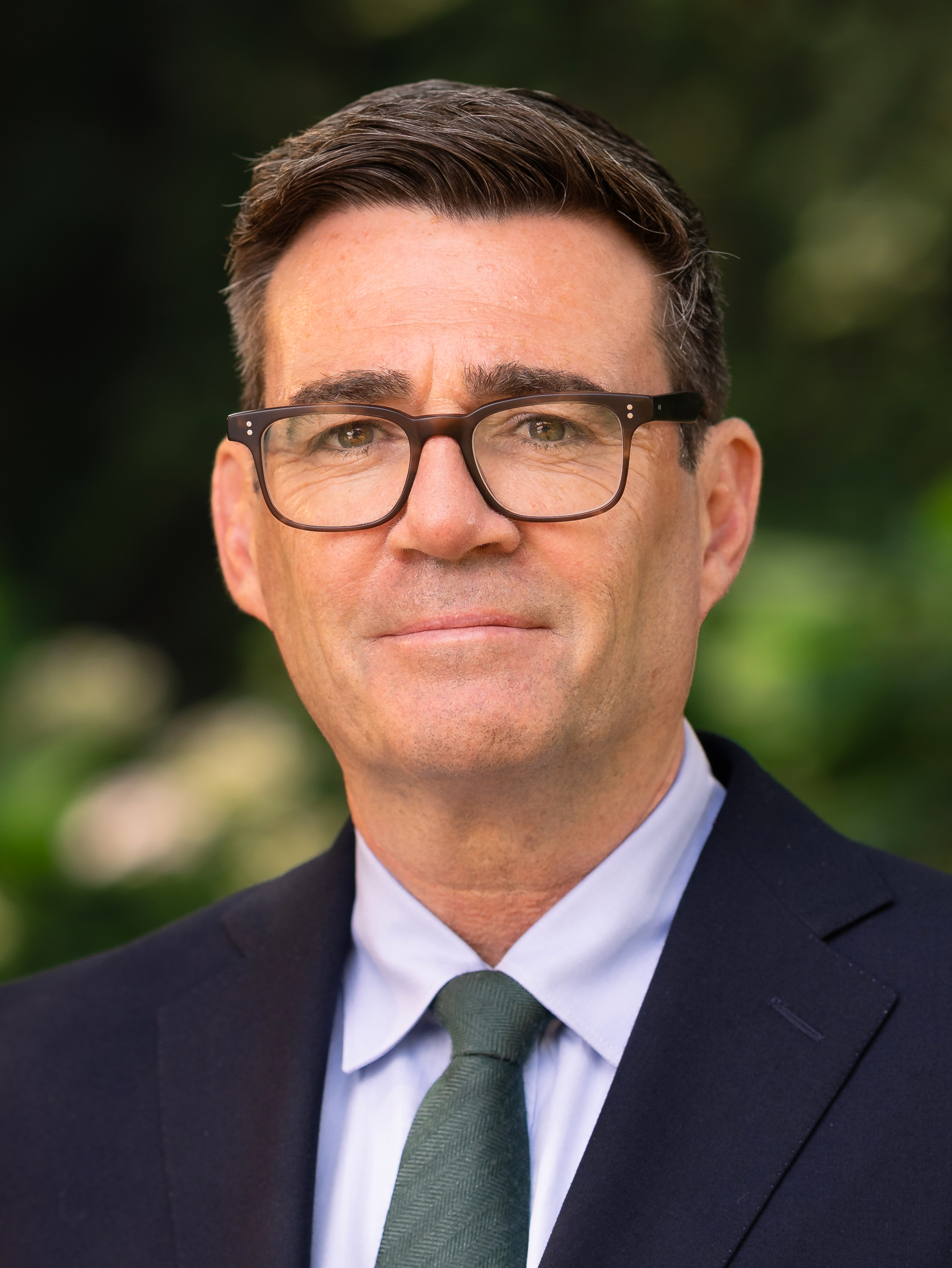
Andy Burnham, Prime Minister (2026–present)

On 22 June 2026, Starmer announced his intention to resign as Prime Minister and Leader of the Labour Party. The subsequent leadership election concluded on 17 July, with Andy Burnham becoming leader unopposed, and with overwhelming support from Labour MPs.

== Ideology ==
Labour sits on the centre-left of the political spectrum. It was formed to provide political representation for the trade union movement in Parliament. The Labour Party gained a socialist commitment with the party constitution of 1918, Clause IV of which called for the "common ownership", or nationalisation, of the "means of production, distribution and exchange". Although about a third of British industry was taken into public ownership after the Second World War and remained so until the 1980s, the right of the party was questioning the validity of expanding on this by the late 1950s. Influenced by Anthony Crosland's book The Future of Socialism (1956), the circle around party leader Hugh Gaitskell felt that the commitment was no longer necessary. An attempt to remove Clause IV from the party constitution in 1959 failed; Tony Blair and New Labour "modernisers" were successful in removing Clause IV in 1994.

Historically influenced by Keynesian economics, the party favoured government intervention in the economy and the redistribution of wealth. Taxation was seen as a means to achieve a "major redistribution of wealth and income" in the October 1974 election manifesto. The party also desired increased rights for workers and a welfare state, including publicly funded healthcare. From the late-1980s onwards, the party adopted free market policies, leading many observers to describe the Labour Party as social democratic or Third Way, rather than democratic socialist. Other commentators go further and argue that traditional social democratic parties across Europe, including the British Labour Party, have been so deeply transformed in recent years that it is no longer possible to describe them ideologically as "social democratic", and that this ideological shift has put new strains on the Labour Party's traditional relationship with the trade unions. Within the party, differentiation was made between the social democratic and the socialist wings of the party, the latter often subscribed to a radical socialist, sometimes even Marxist, ideology.

While affirming a commitment to democratic socialism, the new version of Clause IV no longer definitely commits the party to public ownership of industry and in its place advocates "the enterprise of the market and the rigour of competition" along with "high quality public services [...] either owned by the public or accountable to them". MPs in the Socialist Campaign Group and the Labour Representation Committee see themselves as standard bearers for the radical socialist tradition in contrast to the democratic socialist tradition represented by organisations such as Compass and the magazine Tribune. The group Progress, founded in 1996, represents the centrist position in the party and was opposed to the Corbyn leadership. In 2015, Momentum was created by Jon Lansman as a grass-roots left-wing organisation following Jeremy Corbyn's election as party leader. Rather than organising among the PLP, Momentum is a rank-and-file grouping with an estimated 40,000 members. The party also has a Christian socialist faction, the Christians on the Left society.

=== Symbols ===
Labour has long been identified with red, a political colour traditionally affiliated with socialism and the labour movement. Prior to the red flag logo, the party had used a modified version of the classic 1924 shovel, torch, and quill emblem. In 1924, a brand-conscious Labour leadership had devised a competition, inviting supporters to design a logo to replace the 'polo mint' like motif that had previously appeared in party literature. The winning entry, emblazoned with the word "Liberty" over a design incorporating a torch, shovel, and quill symbol, was popularised through its sale, in badge form, for a shilling. The party conference in 1931 passed a motion "That this conference adopts Party Colours, which should be uniform throughout the country, colours to be red and gold". During the New Labour period, the colour purple was also used, and the party has employed other colours in certain areas according to local tradition.

The red flag, originally the official flag and symbol of the Labour Party

Since the party's inception, the red flag has been Labour's official symbol; the flag has been associated with socialism and revolution ever since the 1789 French Revolution and the revolutions of 1848. The red rose, a symbol of socialism and social democracy, was adopted as the party symbol in 1986 as part of a rebranding exercise and is now incorporated into the party logo.

The red flag became an inspiration, which resulted in the composition of "The Red Flag", the official party anthem since its inception, being sung at the end of party conferences and on various occasions such as in Parliament in February 2006 to mark the centenary of the Labour Party's founding. It still remains in use, although attempts were made to play down the role of the song during New Labour. The song "Jerusalem", based on a William Blake poem, is also traditionally sung at the end of party conferences with The Red Flag.

== Constitution and structure ==
Clause IV (1995)

The Labour Party is a democratic socialist party. It believes that by the strength of our common endeavour we achieve more than we achieve alone, so as to create for each of us the means to realise our true potential and for all of us a community in which power, wealth and opportunity are in the hands of the many, not the few, where the rights we enjoy reflect the duties we owe, and where we live together, freely, in a spirit of solidarity, tolerance and respect.

— Party Constitution, Labour Party Rule Book

The Labour Party is a membership organisation consisting of individual members and constituency Labour parties, affiliated trade unions, socialist societies and the Co-operative Party, with which it has an electoral agreement. Members who are elected to parliamentary positions take part in the Parliamentary Labour Party (PLP). Prior to Brexit in January 2020, members also took part in the European Parliamentary Labour Party (EPLP).

The party's decision-making bodies on a national level formally include the National Executive Committee (NEC), Labour Party Conference and National Policy Forum (NPF)—although in practice the Parliamentary leadership has the final say on policy. The 2008 Labour Party Conference was the first at which affiliated trade unions and Constituency Labour Parties did not have the right to submit motions on contemporary issues that would previously have been debated. Labour Party conferences now include more "keynote" addresses, guest speakers and question-and-answer sessions, while specific discussion of policy now takes place in the National Policy Forum.

The Labour Party is an unincorporated association without a separate legal personality, and the Labour Party Rule Book legally regulates the organisation and the relationship with members. The General Secretary represents the party on behalf of the other members of the Labour Party in any legal matters or actions.

=== Membership and registered supporters ===
Labour Party individual membership, excluding affiliated members and supporters

As of 31 December 2010, under the new leader Ed Miliband, individual membership of the party was 193,261; a historical low for the Party since the 1930s. Membership remained relatively unchanged in the following years. In August 2015, prior to the 2015 leadership election, the Labour Party reported 292,505 full members, 147,134 affiliated supporters (mostly from affiliated trade unions and socialist societies) and 110,827 registered supporters; a total of about 550,000 members and supporters.

Following the election of Jeremy Corbyn as leader, individual membership almost doubled to 388,262 in December 2015; and rose significantly again the following year to 543,645 in December 2016. As of December 2017, the party had 564,443 full members, a peak since 1980 making it the largest political party in Western Europe. Consequently, membership fees became the largest component of the party's income, overtaking trade unions donations which were previously of most financial importance, making Labour the most financially well-off British political party in 2017. As of December 2019, the party had 532,046 full members.

In the 2020 leadership election, 490,731 people voted, of which 401,564 (81.8%) were members, 76,161 (15.5%) had affiliated membership and 13,006 (2.6%) were registered supporters. The registered supporter class was abolished in 2021. By December 2023, the party's membership had fallen to 370,450 members. In 2023, Starmer had told members "If you don't like the changes that we've made, I say the door is open, and you can leave." Membership continued to decline and at the end of 2025 it had reduced to 264,754 members, below that of 2015. With the loss of membership, which Labour news website LabourList described as "the haemorrhage is enormous", Labour made a financial loss of £3.8 million in 2024 and £2.6 million in 2025.

==== Northern Ireland ====
For many years, Labour held to a policy of not allowing residents of Northern Ireland to apply for membership, instead supporting the Social Democratic and Labour Party (SDLP) which informally takes the Labour whip in the House of Commons. The 2003 Labour Party Conference accepted legal advice that the party could not continue to prohibit residents of the province joining, and while the National Executive has established a regional constituency party it has not yet agreed to contest elections there. In December 2015 a meeting of the members of the Labour Party in Northern Ireland decided unanimously to contest the elections for the Northern Ireland Assembly held in May 2016. The Labour Party in Northern Ireland moved a model motion, in July 2020, for Labour's NEC to allow them a "Right to Stand". The motion noted how the SDLP's alliance with Fianna Fáil, a member-party of the Liberal International in the Republic of Ireland, had meant that it was campaigning against the Irish Labour Party, which it saw as questioning "the legitimacy of Labour's sister party relationship".

=== Trade union link ===
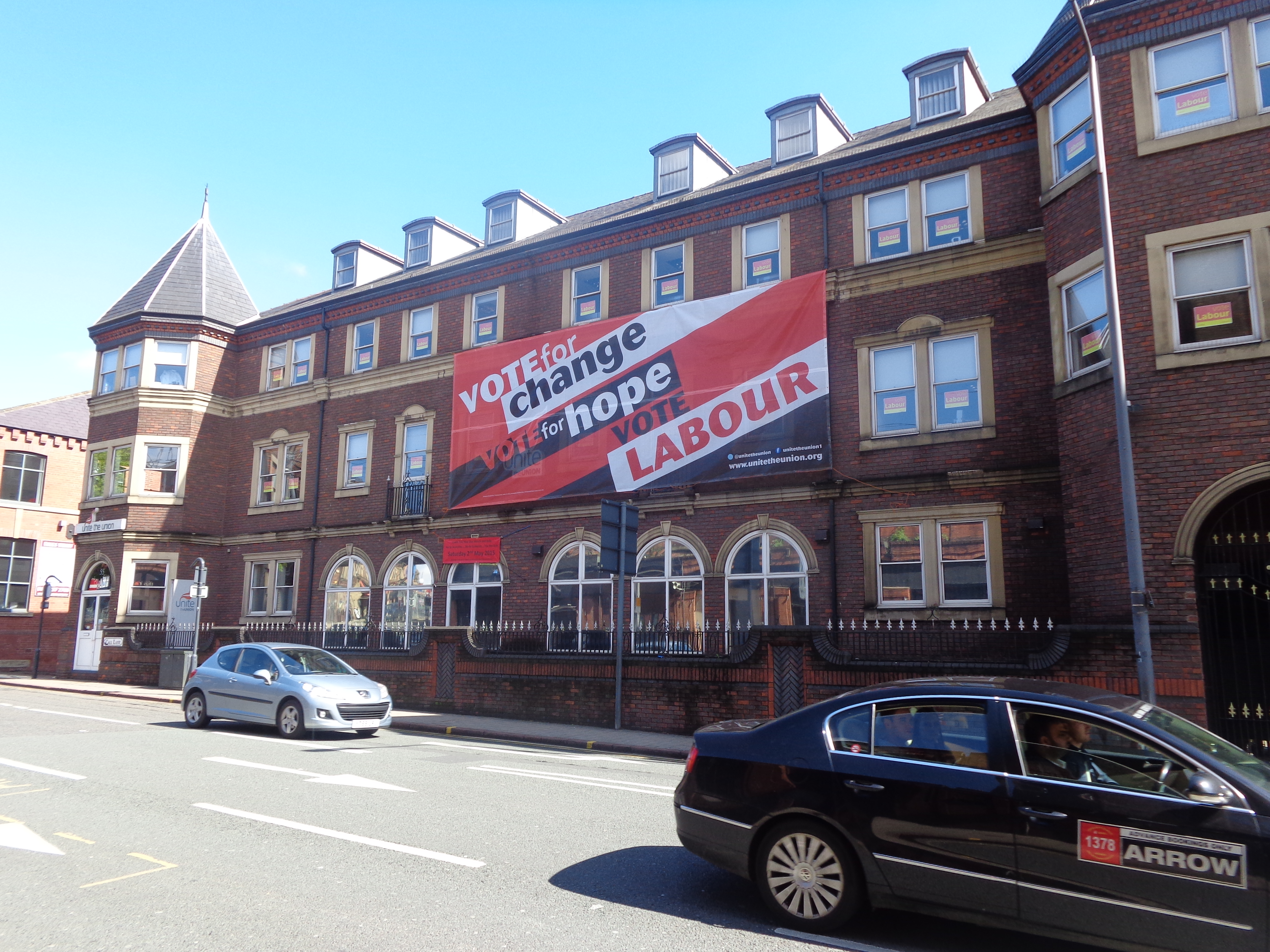
Unite the Union showing their support for the Labour party on their Leeds offices during the 2015 general election

The Trade Union and Labour Party Liaison Organisation is the co-ordinating structure that supports the policy and campaign activities of affiliated union members within the Labour Party at the national, regional and local level.

As it was founded by the unions to represent the interests of working-class people, Labour's link with the unions has always been a defining characteristic of the party. In recent years this link has come under increasing strain, with the RMT being expelled from the party in 2004 for allowing its branches in Scotland to affiliate to the left-wing Scottish Socialist Party. Other unions have also faced calls from members to reduce financial support for the Party and seek more effective political representation for their views on privatisation, public spending cuts and the anti-trade union laws. Unison and GMB have both threatened to withdraw funding from constituency MPs and Dave Prentis of UNISON has warned that the union will write "no more blank cheques" and is dissatisfied with "feeding the hand that bites us". Union funding was redesigned in 2013 after the Falkirk candidate-selection controversy. The Fire Brigades Union, which "severed links" with Labour in 2004, re-joined the party under Corbyn's leadership in 2015.

=== European and international affiliation ===
The Labour Party was a founder member of the Party of European Socialists (PES). The European Parliamentary Labour Party's final 10 MEPs were part of the Socialists and Democrats (S&D), the second largest group in the European Parliament. The Labour Party was represented by Emma Reynolds in the PES presidency.

The party was a member of the Labour and Socialist International between 1923 and 1940. Since 1951, the party has been a member of the Socialist International, which was founded thanks to the efforts of the Clement Attlee leadership. In February 2013, the Labour Party NEC decided to downgrade participation to observer membership status, "in view of ethical concerns, and to develop international co-operation through new networks". Labour was a founding member of the Progressive Alliance international founded in co-operation with the Social Democratic Party of Germany and other social-democratic parties on 22 May 2013.

== Election results ==
In all general elections since 1918, Labour has been either the governing party or the Official Opposition.

=== UK general election results ===
Following the 1918 general election, Labour became the Official Opposition after the Conservatives went into coalition with the Liberal Party. Labour's first minority governments came following the 1923 and 1929 general elections, the latter being the first time Labour were the largest party in the country by seats won. They formed their first majority government following the 1945 general election. However, after winning the 1950 general election, Labour would lose the following election in 1951 to the Conservatives despite gaining the highest share of votes to date at 48.8%. During the 1983 election, Labour posted their worst vote share in the post-war period at 27.6%. In 1997, a party record of 418 Labour MPs were elected. At the 2024 general election, Labour won a landslide victory and returned to government with Keir Starmer as prime minister.

Parliament of the United Kingdom
| Election | Leader | Votes | | Seats | | | Position | Result | Ref. |
| Election | Leader | No. | Share | No. | ± | Share | Position | Result | Ref. |
|---|---|---|---|---|---|---|---|---|---|
| 1900 | Keir Hardie | 62,698 | 1.8 | 2 / 670 | ▲2 | 0.3 | 4th | Conservative–Liberal Unionist | |
| 1906 | Keir Hardie | 321,663 | 5.7 | 29 / 670 | ▲27 | 4.3 | 4th | Liberal | |
| January 1910 | Arthur Henderson | 505,657 | 7.6 | 40 / 670 | ▲11 | 6.0 | 4th | Liberal minority | |
| December 1910 | George Nicoll Barnes | 371,802 | 7.1 | 42 / 670 | ▲2 | 6.3 | 4th | Liberal minority | |
| 1918 (Note: The first election held under the Representation of the People Act 1918 in which all men over 21, and most women over the age of 30 could vote, and therefore a much larger electorate.) | William Adamson | 2,245,777 | 20.8 | 57 / 707 | ▲15 | 8.1 | 4th | Coalition Liberal–Conservative | |
| 1922 | J. R. Clynes | 4,237,349 | 29.7 | 142 / 615 | ▲85 | 23.1 | ▲2nd | Conservative | |
| 1923 | Ramsay MacDonald | 4,439,780 | 30.7 | 191 / 615 | ▲49 | 31.1 | 2nd | Labour minority | |
| 1924 | Ramsay MacDonald | 5,489,087 | 33.3 | 151 / 615 | ▼40 | 24.6 | 2nd | Conservative | |
| 1929 (Note: First election held under the Representation of the People (Equal Franchise) Act 1928 which gave all women aged over 21 the vote.) | Ramsay MacDonald | 8,370,417 | 37.1 | 287 / 615 | ▲136 | 46.7 | ▲1st | Labour minority | |
| 1931 | Arthur Henderson | 6,649,630 | 30.9 | 52 / 615 | ▼235 | 8.5 | ▼2nd | Conservative–Liberal–National Labour | |
| 1935 | Clement Attlee | 8,325,491 | 38.0 | 154 / 615 | ▲102 | 25.0 | 2nd | Conservative–Liberal National–National Labour | |
| 1945 | Clement Attlee | 11,967,746 | 48.0 | 393 / 640 | ▲239 | 61.4 | ▲1st | Labour | |
| 1950 | Clement Attlee | 13,266,176 | 46.1 | 315 / 625 | ▼78 | 50.4 | 1st | Labour | |
| 1951 | Clement Attlee | 13,948,883 | 48.8 | 295 / 625 | ▼20 | 47.2 | ▼2nd | Conservative | |
| 1955 | Clement Attlee | 12,405,254 | 46.4 | 277 / 630 | ▼18 | 44.0 | 2nd | Conservative | |
| 1959 | Hugh Gaitskell | 12,216,172 | 43.8 | 258 / 630 | ▼19 | 41.0 | 2nd | Conservative | |
| 1964 | Harold Wilson | 12,205,808 | 44.1 | 317 / 630 | ▲59 | 50.3 | ▲1st | Labour | |
| 1966 | Harold Wilson | 13,096,629 | 48.0 | 364 / 630 | ▲47 | 57.8 | 1st | Labour | |
| 1970 (Note: Franchise extended to all 18 to 20-year-olds under the Representation of the People Act 1969.) | Harold Wilson | 12,208,758 | 43.1 | 288 / 630 | ▼76 | 45.7 | ▼2nd | Conservative | |
| February 1974 | Harold Wilson | 11,645,616 | 37.2 | 301 / 635 | ▲13 | 47.4 | ▲1st | Labour minority | |
| October 1974 | Harold Wilson | 11,457,079 | 39.3 | 319 / 635 | ▲18 | 50.2 | 1st | Labour | |
| 1979 | James Callaghan | 11,532,218 | 36.9 | 269 / 635 | ▼50 | 42.4 | ▼2nd | Conservative | |
| 1983 | Michael Foot | 8,456,934 | 27.6 | 209 / 650 | ▼60 | 32.2 | 2nd | Conservative | |
| 1987 | Neil Kinnock | 10,029,807 | 30.8 | 229 / 650 | ▲20 | 35.2 | 2nd | Conservative | |
| 1992 | Neil Kinnock | 11,560,484 | 34.4 | 271 / 651 | ▲42 | 41.6 | 2nd | Conservative | |
| 1997 | Tony Blair | 13,518,167 | 43.2 | 418 / 659 | ▲145 | 63.4 | ▲1st | Labour | |
| 2001 | Tony Blair | 10,724,953 | 40.7 | 412 / 659 | ▼6 | 62.5 | 1st | Labour | |
| 2005 | Tony Blair | 9,552,436 | 35.2 | 355 / 646 | ▼47 | 55.0 | 1st | Labour | |
| 2010 | Gordon Brown | 8,606,517 | 29.0 | 258 / 650 | ▼90 | 39.7 | ▼2nd | Conservative–Liberal Democrats | |
| 2015 | Ed Miliband | 9,347,324 | 30.4 | 232 / 650 | ▼26 | 35.7 | 2nd | Conservative | |
| 2017 | Jeremy Corbyn | 12,877,918 | 40.0 | 262 / 650 | ▲30 | 40.3 | 2nd | Conservative minority with DUP confidence and supply | |
| 2019 | Jeremy Corbyn | 10,269,051 | 32.1 | 202 / 650 | ▼60 | 31.1 | 2nd | Conservative | |
| 2024 | Keir Starmer | 9,708,716 | 33.7 | 411 / 650 | ▲209 | 63.2 | ▲1st | Labour | |

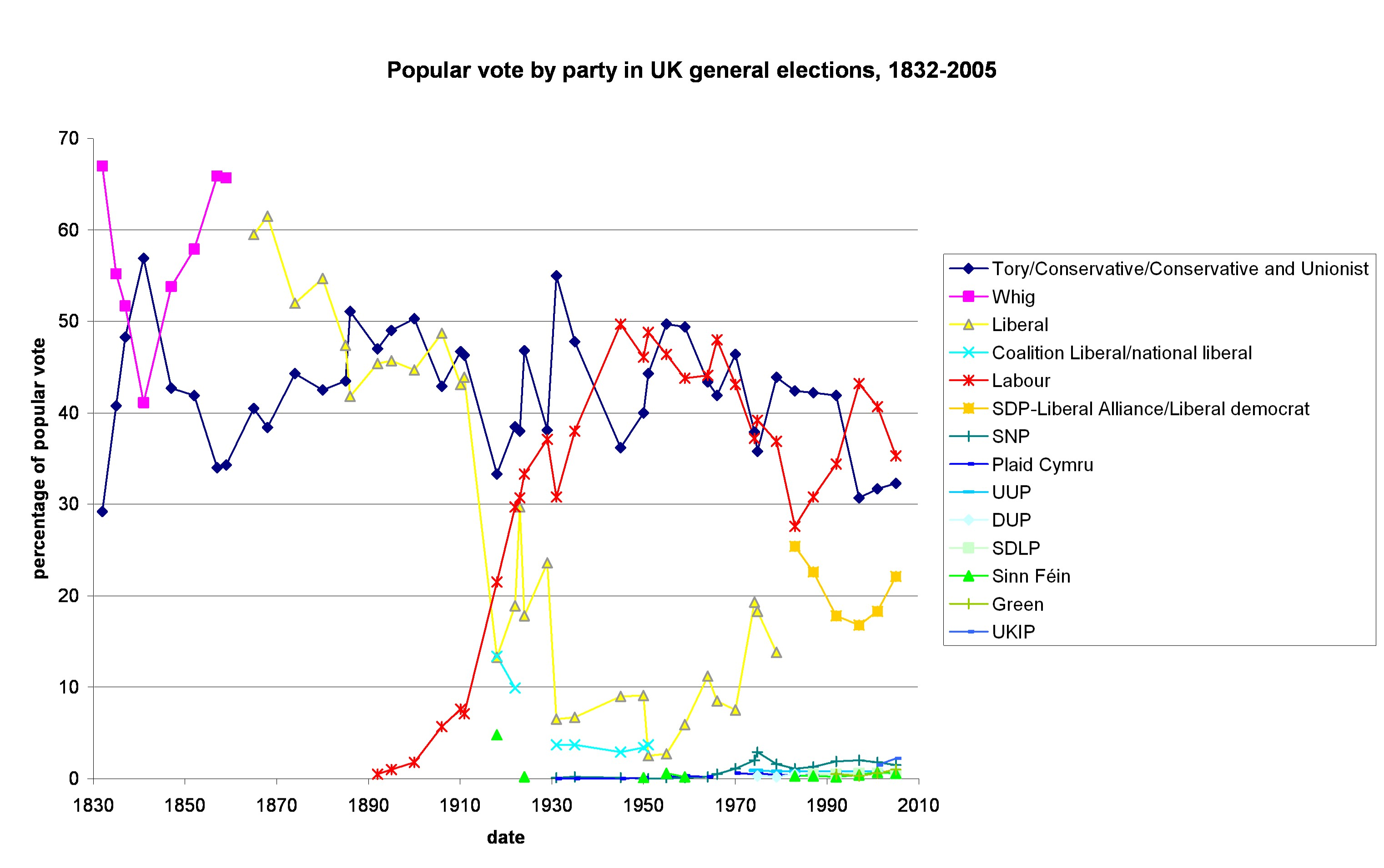
A graph showing the percentage of the popular vote received by major parties in general elections (1832–2005)

== Leadership ==
=== Leaders of the Labour Party since 1906 ===
There have been 19 different Leaders of the Labour Party since 1906, along with three different Acting Leaders.

- Keir Hardie (1906–1908)
- Arthur Henderson (1908–1910)
- George Barnes (1910–1911)
- Ramsay MacDonald (1911–1914)
- Arthur Henderson (1914–1917)
- William Adamson (1917–1921)
- J. R. Clynes (1921–1922)
- Ramsay MacDonald (1922–1931)
- Arthur Henderson (1931–1932)
- George Lansbury (1932–1935)
- Clement Attlee (1935–1955)
- Hugh Gaitskell (1955–1963)
  - George Brown (1963; acting)
- Harold Wilson (1963–1976)
- James Callaghan (1976–1980)
- Michael Foot (1980–1983)
- Neil Kinnock (1983–1992)
- John Smith (1992–1994)
  - Margaret Beckett (1994; acting)
- Tony Blair (1994–2007)
- Gordon Brown (2007–2010)
  - Harriet Harman (2010; acting)
- Ed Miliband (2010–2015)
  - Harriet Harman (2015; acting)
- Jeremy Corbyn (2015–2020)
- Keir Starmer (2020–2026)
- Andy Burnham (2026–present)

=== Deputy Leaders of the Labour Party since 1922 ===
There have been 18 different Deputy Leaders of the Labour Party since 1922.

- J. R. Clynes (1922–1932)
- William Graham (1931–1932)
- Clement Attlee (1932–1935)
- Arthur Greenwood (1935–1945)
- Herbert Morrison (1945–1956)
- Jim Griffiths (1956–1959)
- Aneurin Bevan (1959–1960)
- George Brown (1960–1970)
- Roy Jenkins (1970–1972)
- Edward Short (1972–1976)
- Michael Foot (1976–1980)
- Denis Healey (1980–1983)
- Roy Hattersley (1983–1992)
- Margaret Beckett (1992–1994)
- John Prescott (1994–2007)
- Harriet Harman (2007–2015)
- Tom Watson (2015–2019)
- Angela Rayner (2020–2025)
- Lucy Powell (2025–present)

=== Leaders in the House of Lords since 1924 ===
- Richard Haldane, 1st Viscount Haldane (1924–1928)
- Charles Cripps, 1st Baron Parmoor (1928–1931)
- Arthur Ponsonby, 1st Baron Ponsonby of Shulbrede (1931–1935)
- Harry Snell, 1st Baron Snell (1935–1940)
- Christopher Addison, 1st Viscount Addison (1940–1952)
- William Jowitt, 1st Earl Jowitt (1952–1955)
- Albert Victor Alexander, 1st Earl Alexander of Hillsborough (1955–1964)
- Frank Pakenham, 7th Earl of Longford (1964–1968)
- Edward Shackleton, Baron Shackleton (1968–1974)
- Malcolm Shepherd, 2nd Baron Shepherd (1974–1976)
- Fred Peart, Baron Peart (1976–1982)
- Cledwyn Hughes, Baron Cledwyn of Penrhos (1982–1992)
- Ivor Richard, Baron Richard (1992–1998)
- Margaret Jay, Baroness Jay of Paddington (1998–2001)
- Gareth Williams, Baron Williams of Mostyn (2001–2003)
- Valerie Amos, Baroness Amos (2003–2007)
- Catherine Ashton, Baroness Ashton of Upholland (2007–2008)
- Janet Royall, Baroness Royall of Blaisdon (2008–2015)
- Angela Smith, Baroness Smith of Basildon (2015–present)

=== Labour prime ministers ===
Labour prime ministers of the United Kingdom
| No. | Name | Portrait | Periods in office |
|---|---|---|---|
| 1st | Ramsay MacDonald | | 1924; 1929–1931 (first and second MacDonald ministries) |
| 2nd | Clement Attlee | | 1945–1950; 1950–1951 (first and second Attlee ministries) |
| 3rd | Harold Wilson | | 1964–1966; 1966–1970; 1974; 1974–1976 (first, second, third and fourth Wilson ministries) |
| 4th | James Callaghan | | 1976–1979 (Callaghan ministry) |
| 5th | Tony Blair | | 1997–2001; 2001–2005; 2005–2007 (first, second and third Blair ministries) |
| 6th | Gordon Brown | | 2007–2010 (Brown ministry) |
| 7th | Keir Starmer | Keir Starmer | 2024–2026 (Starmer ministry) |
| 8th | Andy Burnham | Andy Burnham | 2026–present (Burnham ministry) |

== See also ==
- Labour Representation Committee election results
- List of Labour Party (UK) MPs
- List of organisations associated with the Labour Party (UK)
- List of Labour Party (UK) general election manifestos
- English Labour Network
- Politics of the United Kingdom
- Post-war consensus
- Socialist Labour Party (UK)
- Socialist Party (England and Wales)

== Bibliography ==
- Barlow, Keith (2008). The Labour Movement in Britain from Thatcher to Blair. Frankfurt: Peter Lang. ISBN 978-3-631-55137-0.
- "Scottish election 2021: The numbers behind the result". BBC News. Archived from the original on 10 May 2021.
- Beech, Matt (2006). The Political Philosophy of New Labour. International Library of Political Studies. Vol. 6. London: Tauris Academic Studies. ISBN 978-1-84511-041-3.
- Bell, Geoffrey (1982). Troublesome Business: Labour Party and the Irish Question. Pluto Press. ISBN 978-0-86104-373-6.
- Brivati, Brian; Heffernan, Richard (2000). The Labour Party: A Centenary History. Basingstoke: Macmillan. ISBN 978-0-312-23458-4.
- Budge, Ian (2008). "Great Britain and Ireland: Variations in Party Government". In Colomer, Josep M. (ed.). Comparative European Politics (3rd ed.). London: Routledge. ISBN 978-1-134-07354-2.
- Clark, Alistair (2012). Political Parties in the UK. Contemporary Political Studies. Basingstoke: Palgrave Macmillan. ISBN 978-0-230-36868-2.
- Crines, Andrew Scott (2011). Michael Foot and the Labour leadership. Newcastle upon Tyne: Cambridge Scholars. ISBN 978-1-4438-3239-7.
- Daniels, Gary; McIlroy, John, eds. (2009). Trade Unions in a Neoliberal World: British Trade Unions under New Labour. Routledge Research in Employment Relations. Vol. 20. London: Routledge. ISBN 978-0-415-42663-3.
- Garnett, Mark, Gavin Hyman, and Richard Johnson. Keeping the Red Flag Flying: The Labour Party in Opposition Since 1922 (John Wiley & Sons, 2024).
- Hay, Colin (2002). British Politics Today. Cambridge: Polity Press. ISBN 978-0-7456-2319-1.
- Heath, Anthony F.; Jowell, Roger M.; Curtice, John K. (2001). The Rise of New Labour: Party Policies and Voter Choices: Party Policies and Voter Choices. Oxford University Press. ISBN 978-0-19-152964-1.
- Heppell, Timothy (2012). "Hugh Gaitskell, 1955–1963". In Heppell, Timothy (ed.). Leaders of the Opposition: From Churchill to Cameron. Basingstoke: Palgrave Macmillan. ISBN 978-0-230-29647-3.
- Hopkin, Jonathan; Wincott, Daniel (2006). "New Labour, Economic Reform and the European Social Model". British Journal of Politics and International Relations. 8 (1): 50–68. doi:10.1111/j.1467-856X.2006.00227.x. ISSN 1467-856X. S2CID 32060486.
- Jessop, Bob (2004) [2003]. "From Thatcherism to New Labour: Neo-liberalism, Workfarism and Labour-market Regulation". In Overbeek, Henk (ed.). The Political Economy of European Employment: European Integration and the Transnationalization of the (Un)employment Question. RIPE Series in Global Political Economy. London: Routledge. ISBN 978-0-203-01064-8.
- Jones, Tudor (1996). Remaking the Labour Party: From Gaitskell to Blair. London: Routledge. ISBN 978-1-134-80132-9.
- Kelliher, Diarmaid (2014). "Solidarity and Sexuality: Lesbians and Gays Support the Miners 1984–1985" (PDF). History Workshop Journal. 77 (1): 240–262. doi:10.1093/hwj/dbt012. ISSN 1477-4569. S2CID 41955541. Archived (PDF) from the original on 22 July 2018.
- Kenny, Michael; Smith, Martin J. (2013) [1997]. "Discourses of Modernization: Gaitskell, Blair and Reform of Clause IV". In Denver, David; Fisher, Justin; Ludlam, Steve; Pattie, Charles (eds.). British Elections and Parties Review. Vol. 7. London: Routledge. ISBN 978-1-135-25578-7.
- Leach, Robert (2015). Political Ideology in Britain (3rd ed.). London: Palgrave. ISBN 978-1-137-33255-4.
- Lund, Brian (2006). "Distributive Justice and Social Policy". In Lavalette, Michael; Pratt, Alan (eds.). Social Policy: Theories, Concepts and Issues (3rd ed.). London: SAGE Publications. pp. 107–123. ISBN 978-1-4129-0170-3.
- McAnulla, Stuart (2006). British Politics: A Critical Introduction. London: Continuum International Publishing Group. ISBN 978-0-8264-6156-8.
- McClintock, John (2010). The Uniting of Nations: An Essay on Global Governance (3rd ed.). Brussels: Peter Lang. ISBN 978-90-5201-588-0.
- McIlroy, John (2011). "Britain: How Neo-Liberalism Cut Unions Down to Size". In Gall, Gregor; Wilkinson, Adrian; Hurd, Richard (eds.). The International Handbook of Labour Unions: Responses to Neo-Liberalism. Cheltenham: Edward Elgar Publishing. pp. 82–104. ISBN 978-1-84844-862-9.
- Merkel, Wolfgang; Petring, Alexander; Henkes, Christian; Egle, Christoph (2008). Social Democracy in Power: The Capacity to Reform. London: Taylor & Francis. ISBN 978-0-415-43820-9.
- Pugh, Martin (2011) [2010]. Speak for Britain! A New History of the Labour Party. London: Vintage Books. ISBN 978-0-09-952078-8.
- Rentoul, John (2001). Tony Blair: Prime Minister. London: Little, Brown and Company. ISBN 978-0-316-85496-2.
- Riddell, Neil (1997). "The Catholic Church and the Labour Party, 1918–1931". Twentieth Century British History. 8 (2): 165–193. doi:10.1093/tcbh/8.2.165. ISSN 1477-4674.
- Shaw, Eric (1988). Discipline and Discord in the Labour Party: The Politics of Managerial Control in the Labour Party, 1951–1987. Manchester University Press. ISBN 978-0-7190-2483-2.
- Smith, Paul (2009). "New Labour and the Commonsense of Neoliberalism: Trade Unionism, Collective Bargaining and Workers' Rights". Industrial Relations Journal. 40 (4): 337–355. doi:10.1111/j.1468-2338.2009.00531.x. ISSN 1472-9296. S2CID 154993304.
- Smith, Paul; Morton, Gary (2006). "Nine Years of New Labour: Neoliberalism and Workers' Rights" (PDF). British Journal of Industrial Relations. 44 (3): 401–420. doi:10.1111/j.1467-8543.2006.00506.x. ISSN 1467-8543. S2CID 155056617. Archived from the original (PDF) on 26 July 2016.
- Taylor, A. J. P. (1965). English History: 1914–1945. Oxford: Clarendon Press.
- Thorpe, Andrew (1996). "The Industrial Meaning of 'Gradualism': The Labour Party and Industry, 1918–1931". Journal of British Studies. 35 (1): 84–113. doi:10.1086/386097. hdl:10036/19512. ISSN 1545-6986. JSTOR 175746. S2CID 155016569.
- ——— (2001). A History of the British Labour Party (2nd ed.). Basingstoke: Palgrave. ISBN 978-0-333-92908-7.
- ——— (2008). A History of the British Labour Party (3rd ed.). Basingstoke: Palgrave Macmillan. ISBN 978-1-137-11485-3.
- Wright, Tony; Carter, Matt (1997). The People's Party: The History of the Labour Party. London: Thames & Hudson. ISBN 978-0-500-27956-4.
