= British Deputy Leader of the Labour Party =

Second highest ranking politician in the British Labour Party

Deputy Leader of the Labour Party
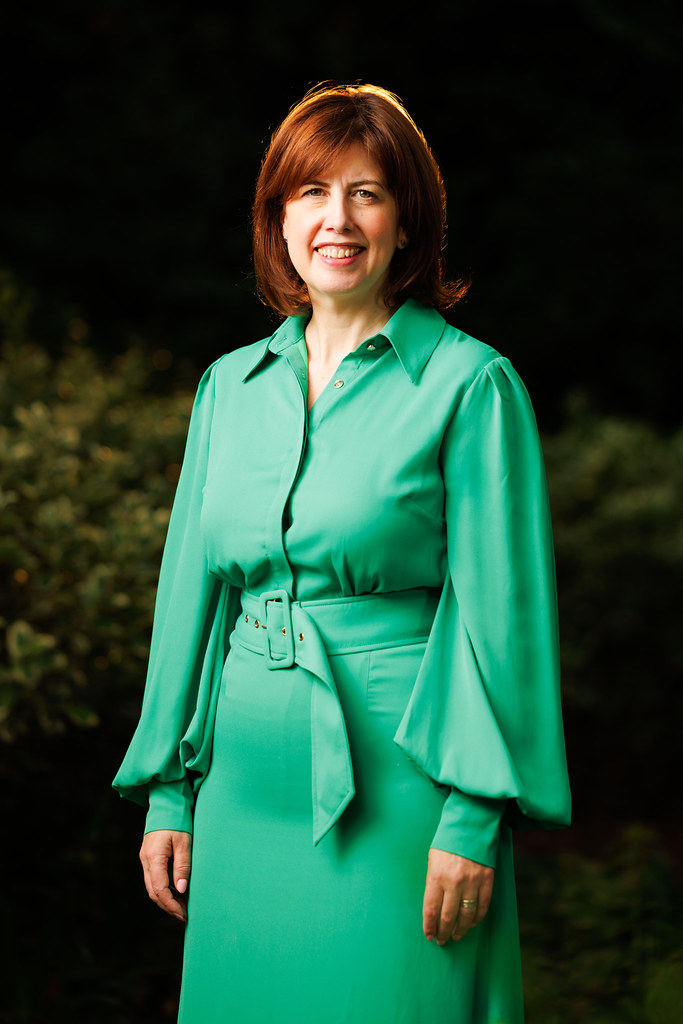
- Incumbent; Lucy Powell since 25 October 2025
- Member of: National Executive Committee
- Reports to: Leader of the Labour Party
- Term length: No fixed term
- Inaugural holder: J. R. Clynes
- Formation: 21 November 1922

The Deputy Leader of the Labour Party is the second-highest ranking politician in the British Labour Party. The current deputy leader is Lucy Powell.

In the event of the Labour Party Leader's immediate resignation, the Deputy Leader will serve as Acting Leader until the election of a successor. It is generally expected that the Deputy will act as Leader in the House of Commons in scenarios where the Leader is otherwise unavailable, although this is not always the case.

== History ==
The 1922 general election was the first in which the Labour Party finished in second place, therefore also forming the Loyal Opposition for the first time. Although J. R. Clynes had overseen the gain of 85 seats as party leader at the general election, he was challenged for the leadership on 21 November by former leader Ramsay MacDonald. In a vote among the party's MPs, MacDonald won by 61 to 56, becoming the first Labour Leader of the Opposition. MacDonald immediately offered to create the position of deputy leader for Clynes, appointing him to the position immediately, with the role becoming officially codified by the National Executive Committee days later.

Between 1922 and 1952, deputy leaders were appointed by acclamation among Labour MPs. In August 1931, Labour MPs decided to appoint a second Deputy Leader, with William Graham chosen to serve alongside Clynes; this marked the first and, to date, only time there have been two deputy leaders serving concurrently. Despite both losing their seats later that year at the general election, they initially remained as joint deputy leaders. Graham died in January 1932 and Clynes resigned as Deputy Leader in October 1932, with only one person holding the position from then on. On 11 November 1952, for the first time, there was a contested election for the position, after Aneurin Bevan challenged the incumbent Herbert Morrison (Morrison won by 194 votes to 82). Deputy leadership elections were subsequently held on the same basis and rules as leadership elections, although were typically more frequent, as it was more common for MPs to challenge a sitting deputy leader than a sitting leader.

Following the 1980 Labour Party Conference, new leadership and deputy leadership rules were adopted that would see the two roles chosen via the alternative vote, with an electoral college having a third of votes allocated to Labour MPs and MEPs, a third to individual members of the Labour Party, and a third to individual members of all affiliated organisations, including socialist societies and trade unions. The first election held under these rules came in 1981, when Tony Benn challenged the incumbent Denis Healey for the position. At a time when the Social Democratic Party had been formed by several former Labour MPs, the 1981 deputy leadership election came to be seen as a hugely significant moment in the history of the Labour Party, after the more moderate Healey defeated the more left-wing Benn by just 0.8%. Deputy leadership elections were held concurrently with leadership elections on these rules until 2015, when the party switched to a "one member, one vote" system. Candidates for the deputy leadership now require nomination by at least 20% of Labour MPs to appear on the ballot.

In 1995, the office of Deputy Prime Minister of the United Kingdom (previously only held once by Clement Attlee as a result of the wartime coalition government) was revived and began to be held frequently by senior politicians in the governing party. John Prescott became the first Deputy Leader of the Labour Party to hold this position, holding it under Tony Blair from 1997 to 2007. In 2024, Angela Rayner became the second Deputy Leader of the Labour Party to hold this position, as well as the first woman to serve as a Labour Deputy Prime Minister. As the deputy leadership is a party role, with no constitutional position, the role of Deputy Prime Minister is not guaranteed to any deputy leader when the Labour Party is in government. In 2007, newly appointed Labour Leader and Prime Minister Gordon Brown announced that the newly elected Deputy Leader, Harriet Harman, would instead become Party Chair and appointed her Leader of the House of Commons and Lord Privy Seal in the Cabinet.

According to the Labour Party's constitution, in the event of a vacancy in the party leadership while the party is in Opposition, the Deputy Leader will automatically become Acting Leader until a new leader can be elected. If a leadership vacancy occurs while the Labour Party is in government, the Cabinet, in consultation with Labour's National Executive Committee, will select a temporary leader who will serve until a new leader can be elected. The latter situation has only occurred twice, when Harold Wilson resigned as leader in 1976 and when Tony Blair resigned as leader in 2007, but in both cases each remained in office until, respectively, James Callaghan and Gordon Brown were elected their successors, and so no Acting Leader was required.

To date, the only deputy leaders who have gone on to be elected Leader of the Labour Party are Clement Attlee and Michael Foot. Conversely, J. R. Clynes served initially as party leader, before being appointed the first Deputy Leader. Four deputy leaders have served as Acting Leaders; Herbert Morrison in 1955 following the retirement of Clement Attlee, George Brown in 1963 following the sudden death of Hugh Gaitskell, Margaret Beckett following the equally sudden death of John Smith in 1994, and Harriet Harman, twice, following the resignations of Gordon Brown in 2010 and Ed Miliband in 2015 respectively. All four served concurrently as Leader of the Opposition during their periods as Acting Leader of the Labour Party.

== Deputy Leaders of the Labour Party (1906–present) ==
Note: the right-hand column does not allocate height proportional to time in office.

=== Deputy Chairman of the Parliamentary Labour Party ===
Portrait		Constituency	Term began	Term ended	Concurrent party and/or government role(s)	Leader(s)
1	David Shackleton (1863–1938)	Clitheroe	17 January 1906	28 January 1908	No other role	Hardie
2	George Barnes (1859–1940)	Glasgow Blackfriars and Hutchesontown	28 January 1908	15 February 1910	No other role	Henderson
3	J. R. Clynes (1869–1949)	Manchester North East	15 February 1910	6 February 1911	No other role	Barnes
4	William Brace (1865–1947)	South Glamorganshire	6 February 1911	13 February 1912	No other role	MacDonald
5	James Parker (1863–1948)	Halifax	13 February 1912	9 February 1914	No other role	MacDonald
6	Alfred Henry Gill (1856–1914)	Bolton	9 February 1914	27 August 1914 (died in office)	No other role	MacDonald
6	Alfred Henry Gill (1856–1914)	Bolton	9 February 1914	27 August 1914 (died in office)	No other role	Henderson
7	John Hodge (1855–1937)	Manchester Gorton	10 November 1914	8 January 1919	Minister for Labour (1916–1917); Minister of Pensions (1917–1919)	Henderson
7	John Hodge (1855–1937)	Manchester Gorton	10 November 1914	8 January 1919	Minister for Labour (1916–1917); Minister of Pensions (1917–1919)	Adamson
–	J. R. Clynes (1869–1949)	Manchester Platting	8 January 1919	14 February 1921	No other role	Adamson
8	Stephen Walsh (1859–1929)	Ince	14 February 1921	22 November 1922	No other role	Clynes
=== Deputy Leader of the Labour Party ===
Portrait		Constituency	Term began	Term ended	Concurrent party and/or government role(s)	Leader(s)
1	J. R. Clynes (1869–1949)	Manchester Platting (lost seat in 1931)	22 November 1922	25 October 1932	Home Secretary (1929–1931); Lord Privy Seal (1924)	MacDonald
1	J. R. Clynes (1869–1949)	Manchester Platting (lost seat in 1931)	22 November 1922	25 October 1932	Home Secretary (1929–1931); Lord Privy Seal (1924)	Henderson
2	William Graham (1887–1932)	Edinburgh Central (lost seat in 1931)	28 August 1931	8 January 1932 (died in office)	President of the Board of Trade (1929–1931)	Henderson
3	Clement Attlee (1883–1967)	Limehouse	25 October 1932	8 October 1935 (elected leader)	Deputy Leader of the Opposition (1932–1935)	Lansbury
Vacant						Attlee
4	Arthur Greenwood (1880–1954)	Wakefield	26 November 1935	29 July 1945	Leader of the Opposition (1942–1945); Minister without Portfolio (1940–1942)	Attlee
5	Herbert Morrison (1888–1965)	Lewisham South (1950–1955); Lewisham East (1945–1950)	29 July 1945	14 December 1955	Leader of the Opposition (1955); Secretary of State for Foreign Affairs (1951); Lord President of the Council (1945–1951); Leader of the House of Commons (1945–1951)	Attlee
5	Herbert Morrison (1888–1965)	Lewisham South (1950–1955); Lewisham East (1945–1950)	29 July 1945	14 December 1955	Leader of the Opposition (1955); Secretary of State for Foreign Affairs (1951); Lord President of the Council (1945–1951); Leader of the House of Commons (1945–1951)	Himself (acting)
Vacant						Gaitskell
6	Jim Griffiths (1890–1975)	Llanelli	2 February 1956	24 October 1959	Deputy Leader of the Opposition (1956–1959)	Gaitskell
7	Aneurin Bevan (1897–1960)	Ebbw Vale	24 October 1959	6 July 1960 (died in office)	Deputy Leader of the Opposition (1959–1960); Shadow Foreign Secretary (1956–1960)	Gaitskell
Vacant						Gaitskell
8	George Brown (1914–1985)	Belper (lost seat in 1970)	10 November 1960	19 June 1970	Shadow Minister of Defence (1956–1961); Shadow Home Secretary (1961–1964); Secretary of State for Foreign Affairs (1964–1968); First Secretary of State (1964–1966); Secretary of State for Economic Affairs (1964–1966); Leader of the Opposition (1963)	Gaitskell
8	George Brown (1914–1985)	Belper (lost seat in 1970)	10 November 1960	19 June 1970	Shadow Minister of Defence (1956–1961); Shadow Home Secretary (1961–1964); Secretary of State for Foreign Affairs (1964–1968); First Secretary of State (1964–1966); Secretary of State for Economic Affairs (1964–1966); Leader of the Opposition (1963)	Himself (acting)
8	George Brown (1914–1985)	Belper (lost seat in 1970)	10 November 1960	19 June 1970	Shadow Minister of Defence (1956–1961); Shadow Home Secretary (1961–1964); Secretary of State for Foreign Affairs (1964–1968); First Secretary of State (1964–1966); Secretary of State for Economic Affairs (1964–1966); Leader of the Opposition (1963)	Wilson
Vacant						Wilson
9	Roy Jenkins (1920–2003)	Birmingham Stechford	8 July 1970	10 April 1972	Shadow Chancellor of the Exchequer (1970–1972)	Wilson
Vacant						Wilson
10	Edward Short (1912–2012)	Newcastle upon Tyne Central	25 April 1972	21 October 1976	Shadow Leader of the House of Commons (1972–1974); Lord President of the Council (1974–1976); Leader of the House of Commons (1974–1976)	Wilson
10	Edward Short (1912–2012)	Newcastle upon Tyne Central	25 April 1972	21 October 1976	Shadow Leader of the House of Commons (1972–1974); Lord President of the Council (1974–1976); Leader of the House of Commons (1974–1976)	Callaghan
11	Michael Foot (1913–2010)	Ebbw Vale	21 October 1976	10 November 1980 (elected leader)	Lord President of the Council (1976–1979); Leader of the House of Commons (1976–1979)	Callaghan
12	Denis Healey (1917–2015)	Leeds East	13 November 1980	2 October 1983	Shadow Foreign Secretary (1980–1987)	Foot
13	Roy Hattersley (1932–2026)	Birmingham Sparkbrook	2 October 1983	18 July 1992	Shadow Home Secretary (1980–1983; 1987–1992); Shadow Chancellor of the Exchequer (1983–1987)	Kinnock
14	Margaret Beckett (born 1943)	Derby South	18 July 1992	21 July 1994	Shadow Leader of the House of Commons (1992–1994); Leader of the Opposition (1994)	Smith
14	Margaret Beckett (born 1943)	Derby South	18 July 1992	21 July 1994	Shadow Leader of the House of Commons (1992–1994); Leader of the Opposition (1994)	Herself (acting)
15	John Prescott (1938–2024)	Kingston upon Hull East	21 July 1994	24 June 2007	Deputy Prime Minister of the United Kingdom (1997–2007); First Secretary of State (2001–2007); Secretary of State for the Environment, Transport and the Regions (1997–2001); Secretary of State for Local Government and the Regions (2002–2006)	Blair
16	Harriet Harman (born 1950)	Camberwell and Peckham	24 June 2007	12 September 2015	Leader of the Opposition (2010; 2015); Chair of the Labour Party (2007–2015); Leader of the House of Commons (2007–2010); Lord Privy Seal (2007–2015); Minister for Women and Equality (2007–2010); Shadow Deputy Prime Minister (2010–2015); Shadow Secretary of State for International Development (2010–2011); Shadow Secretary of State for Culture, Media and Sport (2011–2015)	Brown
16	Harriet Harman (born 1950)	Camberwell and Peckham	24 June 2007	12 September 2015	Leader of the Opposition (2010; 2015); Chair of the Labour Party (2007–2015); Leader of the House of Commons (2007–2010); Lord Privy Seal (2007–2015); Minister for Women and Equality (2007–2010); Shadow Deputy Prime Minister (2010–2015); Shadow Secretary of State for International Development (2010–2011); Shadow Secretary of State for Culture, Media and Sport (2011–2015)	Herself (acting)
16	Harriet Harman (born 1950)	Camberwell and Peckham	24 June 2007	12 September 2015	Leader of the Opposition (2010; 2015); Chair of the Labour Party (2007–2015); Leader of the House of Commons (2007–2010); Lord Privy Seal (2007–2015); Minister for Women and Equality (2007–2010); Shadow Deputy Prime Minister (2010–2015); Shadow Secretary of State for International Development (2010–2011); Shadow Secretary of State for Culture, Media and Sport (2011–2015)	Miliband
16	Harriet Harman (born 1950)	Camberwell and Peckham	24 June 2007	12 September 2015	Leader of the Opposition (2010; 2015); Chair of the Labour Party (2007–2015); Leader of the House of Commons (2007–2010); Lord Privy Seal (2007–2015); Minister for Women and Equality (2007–2010); Shadow Deputy Prime Minister (2010–2015); Shadow Secretary of State for International Development (2010–2011); Shadow Secretary of State for Culture, Media and Sport (2011–2015)	Herself (acting)
17	Tom Watson (born 1967)	West Bromwich East	12 September 2015	12 December 2019	Chair of the Labour Party (2015–2017); Shadow Minister for the Cabinet Office (2015–2016); Shadow Secretary for Digital, Culture, Media and Sport (2016–2019)	Corbyn
Vacant						Corbyn
18	Angela Rayner (born 1980)	Ashton-under-Lyne	4 April 2020	5 September 2025	Shadow First Secretary of State (2020–2023); Deputy Prime Minister of the United Kingdom (2024–2025); Secretary of State for Housing, Communities and Local Government (2024–2025); Chair of the Labour Party (2020–2021)	Starmer
Vacant						Starmer
19	Lucy Powell (born 1974)	Manchester Central	25 October 2025	Incumbent	No other role	Starmer
19	Lucy Powell (born 1974)	Manchester Central	25 October 2025	Incumbent	Secretary of State for Education (2026–present)	Burnham

== Deputy Leaders by time in office ==
This list ranks Deputy Leaders of the Labour Party by their time in office.

Rank	No.	Leader	Time in office
1	15th	John Prescott	12 years, 341 days
2	5th	Herbert Morrison	10 years, 138 days
3	1st	J. R. Clynes	9 years, 339 days
4	4th	Arthur Greenwood	9 years, 245 days
5	8th	George Brown	9 years, 221 days
6	13th	Roy Hattersley	8 years, 291 days
7	16th	Harriet Harman	8 years, 164 days
8	18th	Angela Rayner	5 years, 154 days
9	10th	Edward Short	4 years, 180 days
10	17th	Tom Watson	4 years, 93 days
11	11th	Michael Foot	4 years, 21 days
12	6th	Jim Griffiths	3 years, 264 days
13	12th	Denis Healey	2 years, 324 days
14	3rd	Clement Attlee	2 years, 48 days
15	14th	Margaret Beckett	2 years, 3 days
16	9th	Roy Jenkins	1 year, 278 days
17	19th	Lucy Powell	1 year, 23 days (Note: As of 17 November 2026)
18	7th	Aneurin Bevan	256 days
19	2nd	William Graham	133 days

== See also ==
- Deputy Leader of the Conservative Party (UK)
- Deputy Leader of the Liberal Democrats
