= 1952 Labour Party deputy leadership election =

British political party election

- 11 November 1952
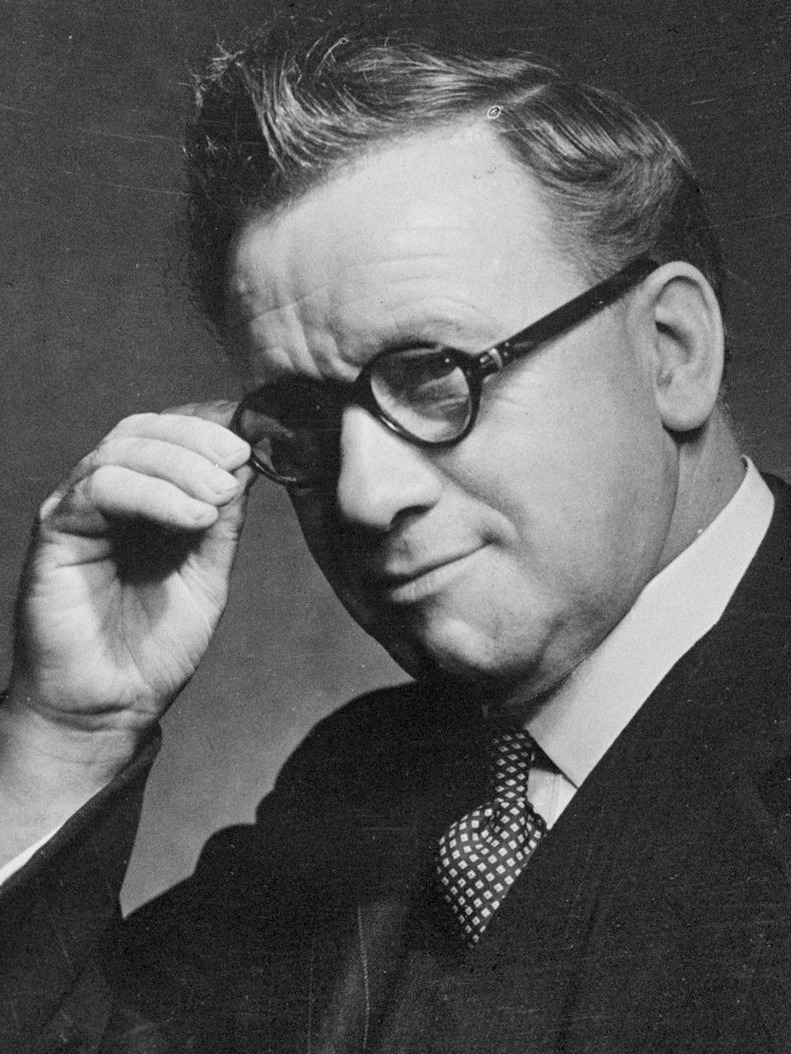

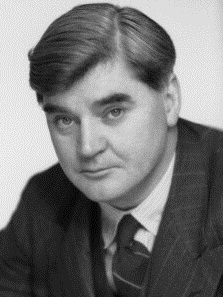
Candidate	Herbert Morrison	Aneurin Bevan
Popular vote	194	82
Percentage	70.3%	29.7%
Deputy Leader before election
Herbert Morrison
Elected Deputy Leader
Herbert Morrison

The 1952 Labour Party deputy leadership election took place on 11 November 1952, after the sitting deputy leader, Herbert Morrison, was challenged by Aneurin Bevan.

== Candidates ==
- Herbert Morrison, incumbent Deputy Leader, Member of Parliament for Lewisham South
- Aneurin Bevan, former Minister of Labour and National Service, Member of Parliament for Ebbw Vale

== Results ==
Only ballot: 11 November 1952
Candidate	Votes	%
Herbert Morrison	194	70.3
Aneurin Bevan	82	29.7
Herbert Morrison re-elected

== Sources ==
- http://privatewww.essex.ac.uk/~tquinn/labour_party_deputy.htm
