= Daniel Wincott =

British academic

- Born: Daniel Edward Wincott; 19 September 1964 (age 62)

Academic background
- Education: London School of Economics
- Thesis: The policy configurations of 'welfare statee' and women's role in the workforce in advanced industrial societies (1999)
- Website: http://www.law.cf.ac.uk/contactsandpeople/wincottd

Daniel Edward Wincott FLSW (born 19 September 1964) is the Blackwell Law and Society Chair at Cardiff Law School, a position he has held since September 2008.

== Education ==
Wincott gained his degree from the University of Manchester, and completed his master's there in 1989. He went on to do his doctorate at London School of Economics which he completed in 1999. His thesis was titled The policy configurations of 'welfare statee' and women's role in the workforce in advanced industrial societies.

== Career ==
Previously, he was based in the Department of Political Science and International Studies at the University of Birmingham. His research interests include European Union law, new institutionalist approaches to political science, devolution and citizenship. In 2016, he was elected a Fellow of the Learned Society of Wales.

== Publications ==
His publications include the co-edited book Accountability and Legitimacy in the European Union (Oxford University Press, 2002), and articles in journals including the Journal of Common Market Studies, Political Studies, Journal of European Public Policy, Public Administration, European Law Journal, Publius: The Journal of Federalism, International Political Science Review and Regional & Federal Studies. He is managing editor, along with Charles Lees, of the Journal of Common Market Studies.
