= 1980 Labour Party deputy leadership election =

1980 Labour Party Deputy Leader Election

- 13 November 1980
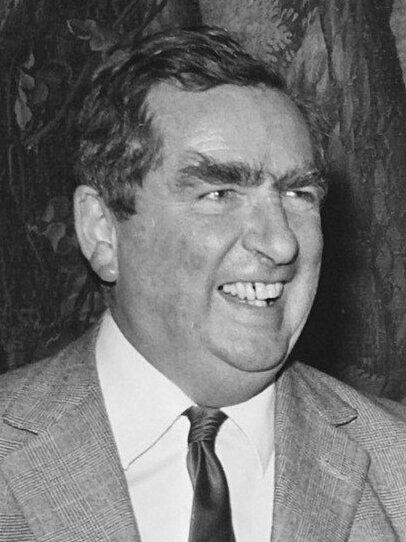
Candidate	Denis Healey
Popular vote	Unopposed
Deputy Leader before election
Michael Foot
Elected Deputy Leader
Denis Healey

The 1980 Labour Party deputy leadership election took place on 13 November 1980 when incumbent deputy leader Michael Foot was elected leader of the Labour Party, defeating Denis Healey. Healey was subsequently elected unopposed as deputy leader.

== Candidates ==
- Denis Healey, Shadow Chancellor of the Exchequer, Member of Parliament for Leeds East

== Sources ==
- LABOUR PARTY DEPUTY LEADERSHIP ELECTIONS 1952-2007
