= 1959 Labour Party deputy leadership election =

UK political party election

- 24 October 1959
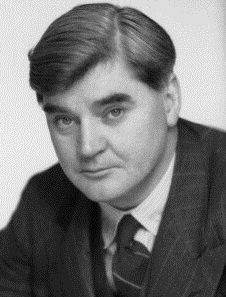
Candidate	Aneurin Bevan
Popular vote	Unopposed
Leader before election
Jim Griffiths
Elected Leader
Aneurin Bevan

The 1959 Labour Party deputy leadership election took place on 24 October 1959, after sitting deputy leader Jim Griffiths retired following that year's general election.

== Candidates ==
- Aneurin Bevan, Shadow Foreign Secretary, Member of Parliament (MP) for Ebbw Vale

== Notes and references ==
- Quinn, Thomas (2013). "Labour Party Deputy Leadership Elections 1952-2007". University of Essex. Archived from the original on 17 April 2014.
