= 1976 Labour Party deputy leadership election =

- 21 October 1976
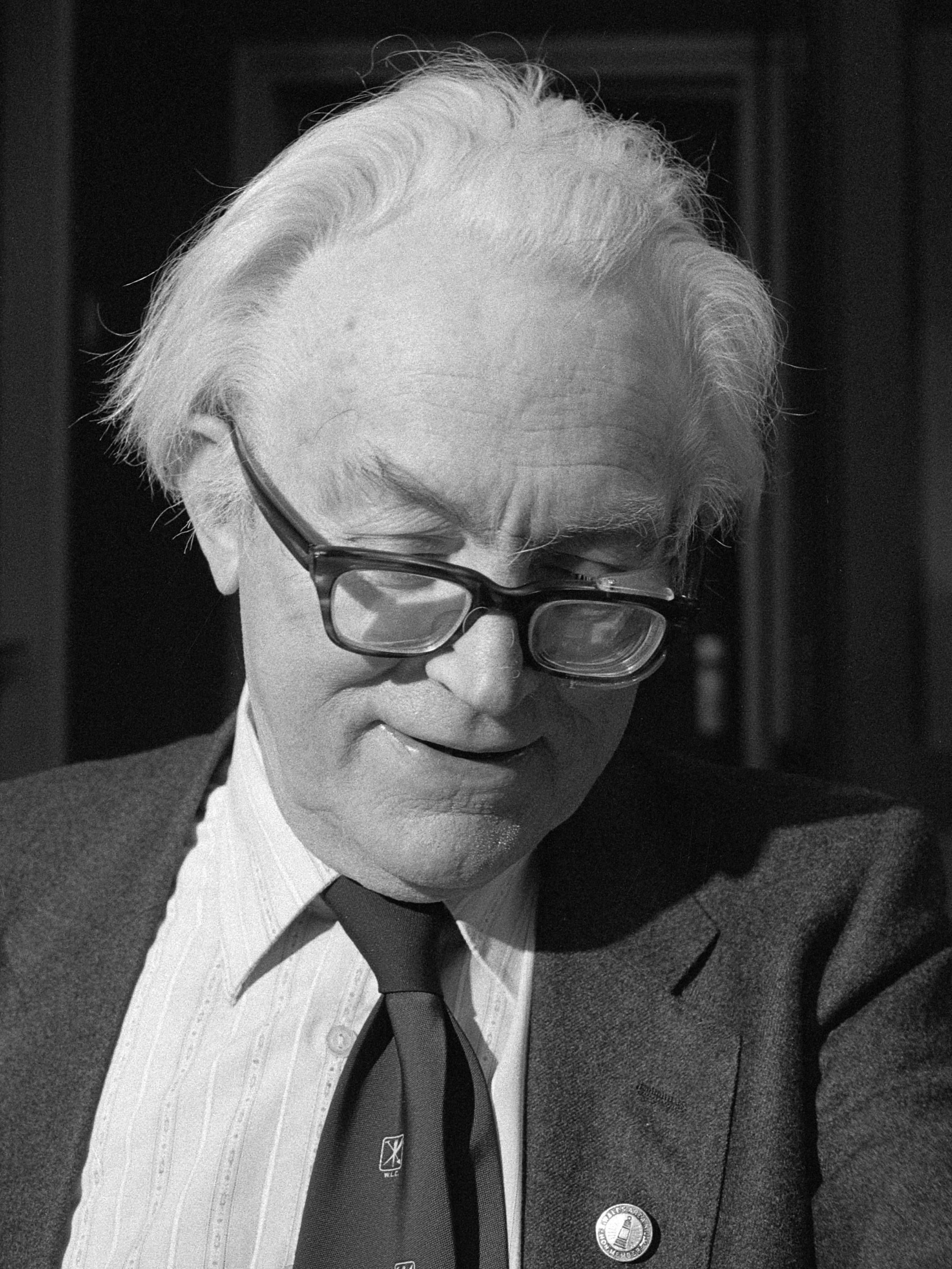

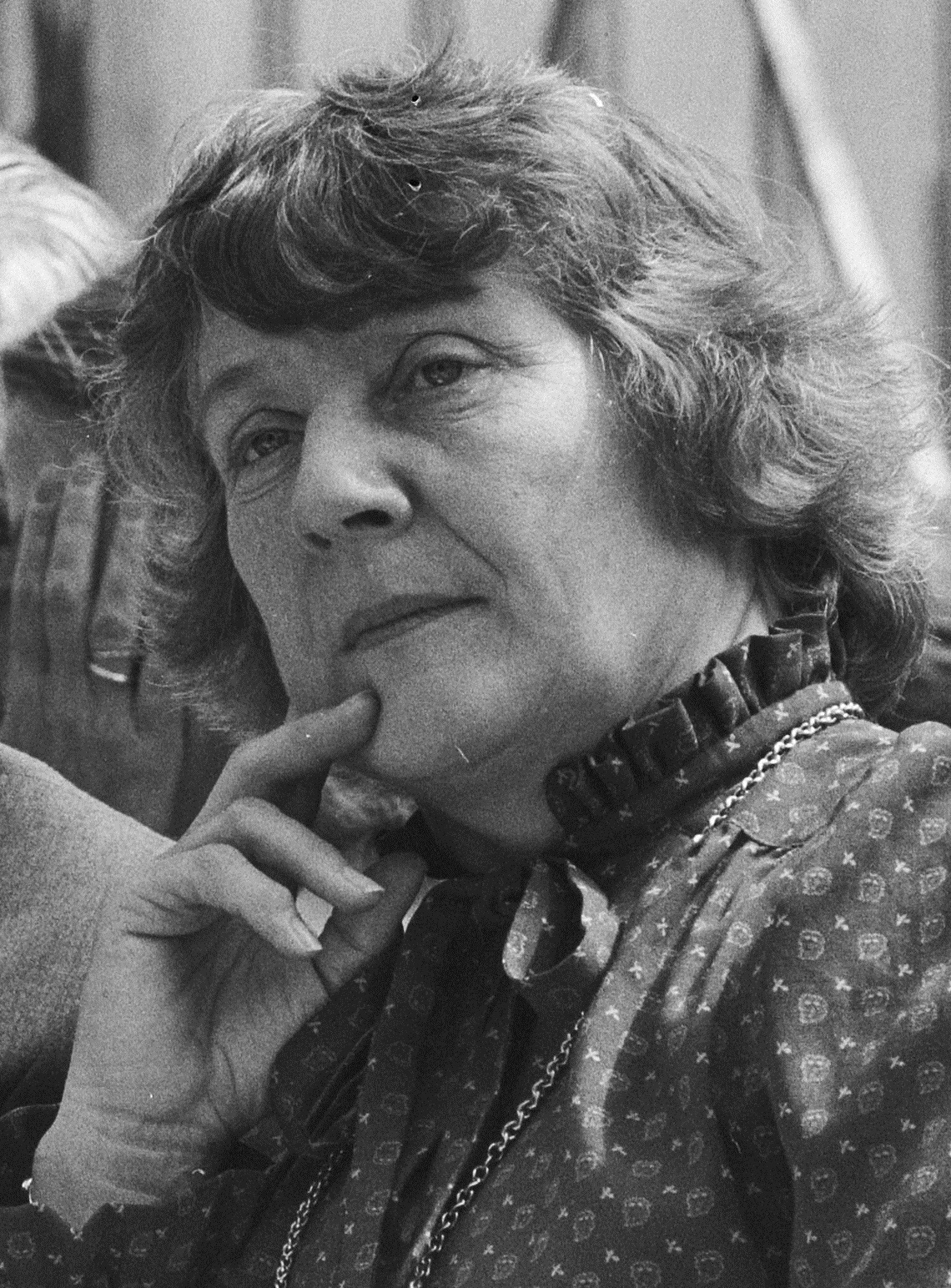
Candidate	Michael Foot	Shirley Williams
Popular vote	166	128
Percentage	56.5%	43.5%
Deputy Leader before election
Edward Short
Elected Deputy Leader
Michael Foot

The 1976 Labour Party deputy leadership election occurred when Edward Short stood down from the deputy leadership of the Labour Party. It was won by Michael Foot who had stood unsuccessfully for the position three times before, and had come second to James Callaghan in the leadership election the previous April.

== Candidates ==
- Michael Foot, Leader of the House of Commons, Member of Parliament for Ebbw Vale
- Shirley Williams, Secretary of State for Education and Science, Member of Parliament for Hertford and Stevenage

== Results ==
Only ballot: 21 October 1976
Candidate	Votes	%
Michael Foot	166	56.5
Shirley Williams	128	43.5
Majority	38	13
Turnout	294	N/A
Michael Foot elected

== Sources ==
- http://privatewww.essex.ac.uk/~tquinn/labour_party_deputy.htm
