= Labour Party leadership election =

Labour or Labor Party leadership election may refer to:

== Australia ==
- June 1991 Australian Labor Party leadership spill
- December 1991 Australian Labor Party leadership spill
- 1996 Australian Labor Party leadership election
- 2001 Australian Labor Party leadership election
- 2003 Australian Labor Party leadership spills
- 2005 Australian Labor Party leadership spill
- 2006 Australian Labor Party leadership spill
- 2010 Australian Labor Party leadership spill
- 2012 Australian Labor Party leadership spill
- March 2013 Australian Labor Party leadership spill
- June 2013 Australian Labor Party leadership spill
- October 2013 Australian Labor Party leadership spill
- 2019 Australian Labor Party leadership election

== Ireland ==
- 2014 Labour Party leadership election (Ireland)
- 2016 Labour Party leadership election (Ireland)
- 2020 Labour Party leadership election (Ireland)
- 2022 Labour Party leadership election (Ireland)

== Israel ==
- 1969 Israeli Labor Party leadership election
- 1974 Israeli Labor Party leadership election
- February 1977 Israeli Labor Party leadership election
- April 1977 Israeli Labor Party leadership election
- 1980 Israeli Labor Party leadership election
- 1984 Israeli Labor Party leadership election
- 1992 Israeli Labor Party leadership election
- 1995 Israeli Labor Party leadership election
- 1997 Israeli Labor Party leadership election
- 2001 Israeli Labor Party leadership election
- 2002 Israeli Labor Party leadership election
- 2003 Israeli Labor Party interim leadership election
- 2005 Israeli Labor Party leadership election
- 2007 Israeli Labor Party leadership election
- 2011 Israeli Labor Party leadership election
- 2013 Israeli Labor Party leadership election
- 2017 Israeli Labor Party leadership election
- 2019 Israeli Labor Party leadership election
- 2021 Israeli Labor Party leadership election
- 2022 Israeli Labor Party leadership election
- 2024 Israeli Labor Party leadership election

== Netherlands ==
- 2002 Labour Party (Netherlands) leadership election
- 2012 Labour Party (Netherlands) leadership election
- 2016 Labour Party (Netherlands) leadership election

== New Zealand ==
- 1919 New Zealand Labour Party leadership election
- 1920 New Zealand Labour Party leadership election
- 1921 New Zealand Labour Party leadership election
- 1922 New Zealand Labour Party leadership election
- 1923 New Zealand Labour Party leadership election
- 1933 New Zealand Labour Party leadership election
- 1940 New Zealand Labour Party leadership election
- 1951 New Zealand Labour Party leadership election
- 1954 New Zealand Labour Party leadership election
- 1963 New Zealand Labour Party leadership election
- 1965 New Zealand Labour Party leadership election
- 1974 New Zealand Labour Party leadership election
- 1980 New Zealand Labour Party leadership election
- 1983 New Zealand Labour Party leadership election
- 1988 New Zealand Labour Party leadership election
- 1989 New Zealand Labour Party leadership election
- 1990 New Zealand Labour Party leadership election
- 1993 New Zealand Labour Party leadership election
- 1996 New Zealand Labour Party leadership election
- 2008 New Zealand Labour Party leadership election
- 2011 New Zealand Labour Party leadership election
- 2013 New Zealand Labour Party leadership election
- 2014 New Zealand Labour Party leadership election
- 2017 New Zealand Labour Party leadership election
- 2023 New Zealand Labour Party leadership election

== United Kingdom ==
Leadership

- 1922 Labour Party leadership election (UK)
- 1931 Labour Party leadership election
- 1932 Labour Party leadership election
- 1935 Labour Party leadership election
- 1955 Labour Party leadership election
- 1960 Labour Party leadership election
- 1961 Labour Party leadership election
- 1963 Labour Party leadership election (UK)
- 1976 Labour Party leadership election
- 1980 Labour Party leadership election (UK)
- 1983 Labour Party leadership election (UK)
- 1988 Labour Party leadership election (UK)
- 1992 Labour Party leadership election
- 1994 Labour Party leadership election
- 2007 Labour Party leadership election (UK)
- 2010 Labour Party leadership election (UK)
- 2015 Labour Party leadership election (UK)
- 2016 Labour Party leadership election (UK)
- 2020 Labour Party leadership election (UK)
- 2026 Labour Party leadership election (UK)

Deputy Leadership

- 1952 Labour Party deputy leadership election
- 1953 Labour Party deputy leadership election
- 1956 Labour Party deputy leadership election
- 1959 Labour Party deputy leadership election
- 1960 Labour Party deputy leadership election
- 1961 Labour Party deputy leadership election
- 1962 Labour Party deputy leadership election
- 1970 Labour Party deputy leadership election
- 1971 Labour Party deputy leadership election
- 1972 Labour Party deputy leadership election
- 1976 Labour Party deputy leadership election
- 1980 Labour Party deputy leadership election
- 1981 Labour Party deputy leadership election
- 1983 Labour Party deputy leadership election
- 1988 Labour Party deputy leadership election
- 1992 Labour Party deputy leadership election
- 1994 Labour Party deputy leadership election
- 2007 Labour Party deputy leadership election
- 2015 Labour Party deputy leadership election
- 2020 Labour Party deputy leadership election
- 2025 Labour Party deputy leadership election

=== Scotland ===
Leadership

- 1998 Scottish Labour leadership election
- 2000 Scottish Labour leadership election
- 2001 Scottish Labour leadership election
- 2007 Scottish Labour leadership election
- 2008 Scottish Labour leadership election
- 2011 Scottish Labour leadership election
- 2014 Scottish Labour leadership election
- 2015 Scottish Labour leadership election
- 2017 Scottish Labour leadership election
- 2021 Scottish Labour leadership election
- 2026 Scottish Labour leadership election

Deputy Leadership

- 2000 Scottish Labour deputy leadership election
- 2008 Scottish Labour deputy leadership election
- 2011 Scottish Labour deputy leadership election
- 2014 Scottish Labour deputy leadership election

=== Wales ===
Leadership

- 1998 Welsh Labour leadership election
- 1999 Welsh Labour leadership election
- 2000 Welsh Labour leadership election
- 2009 Welsh Labour leadership election
- 2018 Welsh Labour leadership election
- February–March 2024 Welsh Labour leadership election
- July 2024 Welsh Labour leadership election
- 2026 Welsh Labour leadership election

Deputy Leadership

- 2018 Welsh Labour deputy leadership election

== See also ==
- Labour government (disambiguation)
