= Socialist Campaign Group =

Left-wing grouping within Labour Party

- President: Dennis Skinner
- Chairperson: Rebecca Long-Bailey
- Secretary: Richard Burgon
- Treasurer: John McDonnell
- Founded: 1982
- Split from: Tribune Group of MPs
- Ideology: Democratic socialism
- Political position: Left-wing
- National affiliation: Labour Party
- Parliamentary Labour Party: 25 / 403
- House of Commons: 25 / 650

The Socialist Campaign Group (Welsh: Grŵp Ymgyrch Sosialaidd), also simply known as the Campaign Group, is a UK parliamentary caucus of the Labour Party including Members of Parliament in the House of Commons.

The group was formed in 1982 following the 1981 Labour Party deputy leadership election when a number of soft left MPs, led by Neil Kinnock, refused to back Tony Benn's campaign, leading a number of left-wing Benn-supporting MPs to split from the Tribune Group to form the Campaign Group. It was at a meeting of the Campaign Group in 2015 that the decision was taken that Jeremy Corbyn would contest for the leadership of the Labour Party. The Campaign Group maintains close links with Momentum.

== Origins ==
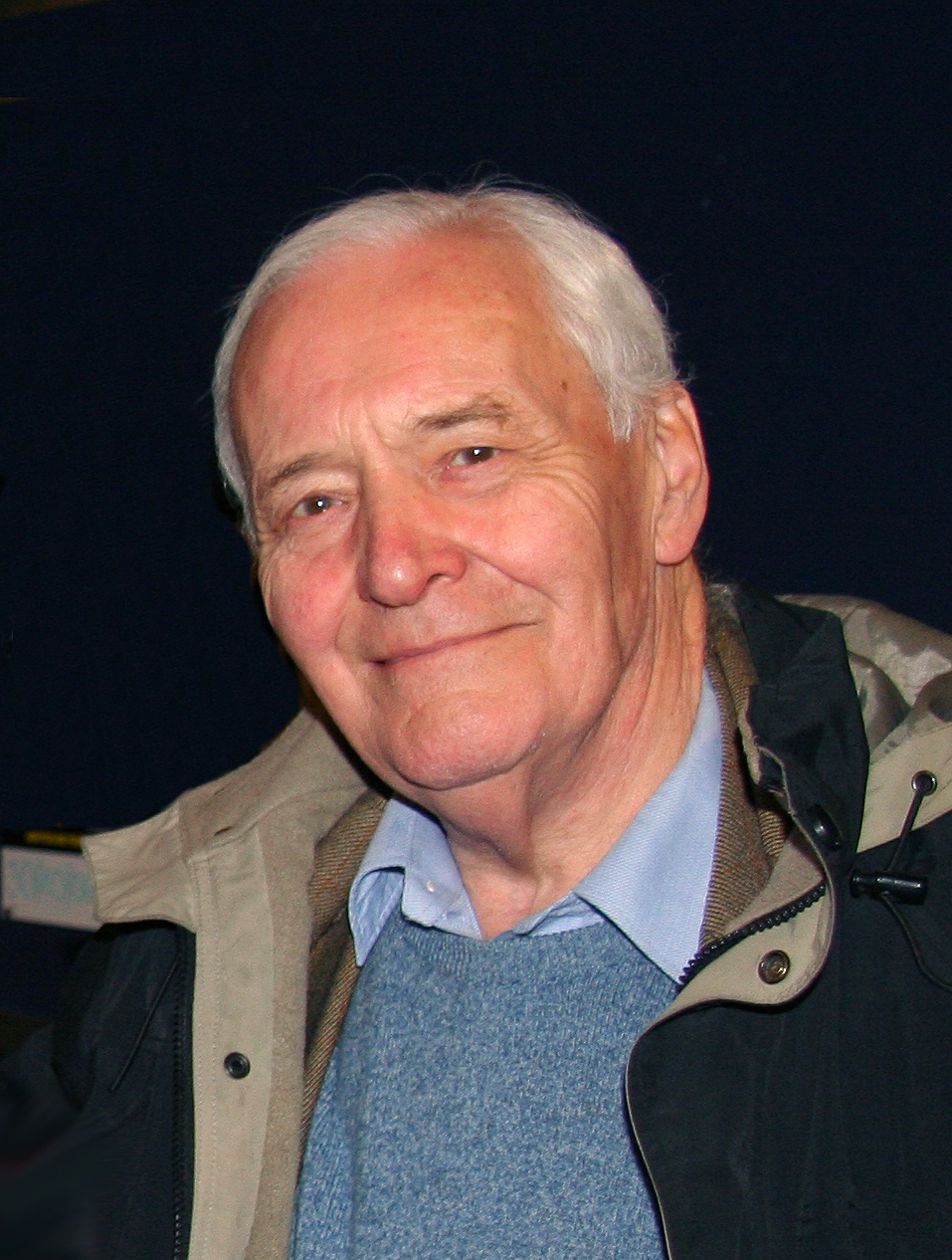
Tony Benn, one of the founding members of the Socialist Campaign Group

The Socialist Campaign Group was founded in 1982 owing to a disagreement within the Labour left, traditionally organised around the Tribune Group, about whom to back in the 1981 Labour Party deputy leadership election. Tony Benn's decision to challenge Denis Healey for the Deputy Leadership of the Labour Party in 1981 was heavily criticised by Labour's leader Michael Foot, who had long been associated with the Labour left and Tribune Group. Tribune Group member and future Labour leader Neil Kinnock led a number of Labour MPs to support John Silkin in the deputy leadership election and abstain in the run-off between Healey and Benn. This sowed the seeds for a split in the left between a "soft left" supportive of Foot's leadership and a dissenting "hard left" organised principally around Benn.

The Campaign Group would go on to back Eric Heffer and Michael Meacher in their unsuccessful bids for the leadership and deputy leadership in 1983. The Campaign Group subsequently organised itself around opposition to the direction the party took under the leadership of Kinnock and his successors. An advertisement in Tribune (24 April 1983) gave the membership of the Campaign Group as: Norman Atkinson, Tony Benn, Ron Brown, Dennis Canavan, Bob Cryer, Don Dixon, Martin Flannery, Stuart Holland, Les Huckfield, Bob Litherland, Joan Maynard, William McKelvey, Andy McMahon, Bob McTaggart, Michael Meacher, Bob Parry, Ray Powell, Reg Race, Allan Roberts, Ernie Roberts, Ernie Ross, Dennis Skinner, and John Tilley.

== Activities and campaigns ==
=== During Kinnock's leadership of the Party ===
Neil Kinnock was hostile to the Campaign Group. He pursued a "carrot and stick" approach to undermining the Campaign Group by promoting MPs who were willing to leave the Campaign Group and renounce their previously held views and by isolating those who remained members.

"From the day Kinnock became leader he made it clear that membership of the left wing Campaign Group of Labour MPs would be a bar to promotion within the PLP. He also made it clear that public repudiation of the group would be amply and swiftly rewarded. Jeremy Corbyn, Labour MP for Islington North and for many years Campaign Group Secretary, remarked that the group was the biggest job creation scheme in the Palace of Westminster. Nearly every one of the twenty-odd ex-members of the Campaign Group sitting in the 1987–92 Parliament was appointed to the front bench shortly after leaving the group."

==== 1984–85 miners' strike ====
During the 1984–85 miners' strike, MPs from the Socialist Campaign Group took action to support the striking miners by visiting picket lines and raising money to be donated to the miners' relief centres. This put pressure on the Labour Party leadership to support the strike, something Neil Kinnock resisted until 10 months after the start of the strike. Members of the Socialist Campaign Group also led a "direct action protest" in the House of Commons by refusing to sit down in order to force a debate on the strike.

==== Anti-poll tax campaign ====
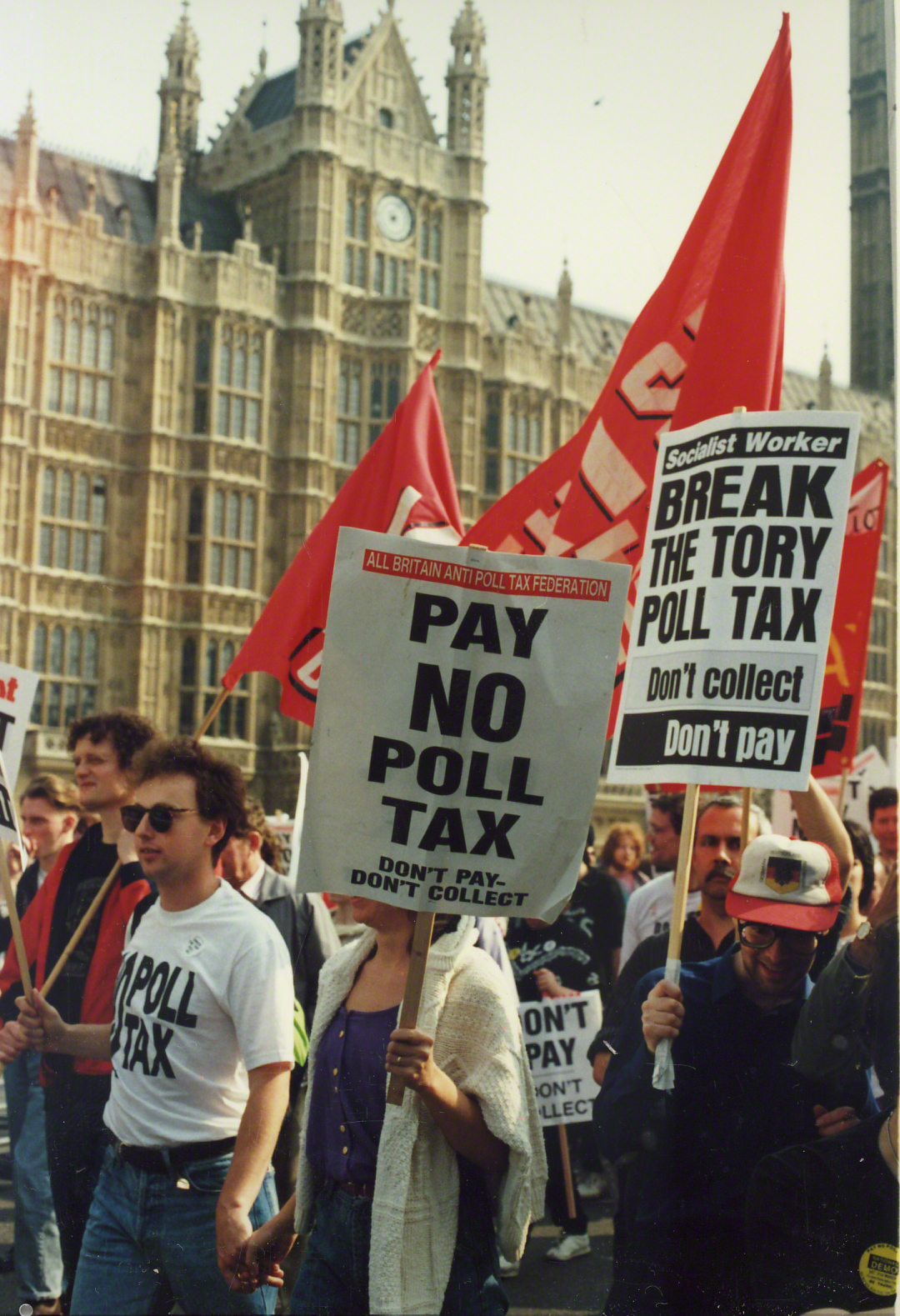
Protestors at the anti-poll tax march in 1990

In 1989, the third Conservative Government of Margaret Thatcher announced plans to introduce a flat-tax to fund local Government. The planned tax became known as the poll tax and was thought by many to be intended to save the rich money and move the expenses onto the poor.

Only 15 Labour MPs supported the Anti Poll Tax Federation. Socialist Campaign Group MPs made up a significant number of these including Tony Benn, who gave his full support to the campaign and spoke at the 200,000 strong anti-Poll Tax demonstration in Trafalgar Square, and Jeremy Corbyn who appeared at Highbury Magistrates' Court in 1991 for not paying his poll tax bill of £481. Corbyn was in court alongside 16 other Islington residents all opposing the levy on grounds other than inability to pay. He told The Times newspaper "I am here today because thousands of people who elected me just cannot afford to pay."

The scale of public opposition in both polls and in the streets have been identified as one of the key causes of the end of Thatcher's premiership. Labour historians have identified the campaign against the Poll Tax as a "huge victory" for the Labour left who campaigned in alliance with the extra-parliamentary socialist left "against one of the most reactionary pieces of legislation dreamt up in the modern age". Tony Benn described the relationship of the campaign against the Poll Tax with the Labour Party:

"The main credit for defeating this monstrosity [the Poll Tax] must go to those, first in Scotland and then in England and Wales, who organised the anti-poll tax unions and the federation that brought them together, for without their brilliant leadership and the mass rallies which they organised the Tories might just have got away with it. This campaign had no support at all from the Labour Party at a national level, no official party rallies being organised, and those who rallied were singled out for disciplinary action, many being expelled from the party just because they were active in the movement, and some prospective local and parliamentary candidates were refused endorsement by the NEC merely for their principled refusal to pay."

=== During the New Labour years ===
In one hilarious meeting [of the Socialist Campaign Group], the Greenham [Common] Women addressed us. They were trying to buy bolt-cutters to cut the fences at Greenham Common, but anytime they turned up at a shop anywhere near, they were denied the right to buy them. So, each Campaign Group member agreed to buy one set of bolt-cutters and donate to the Greenham Women. Which we duly did!

— Jeremy Corbyn, member of the Socialist Campaign Group, interviewed in 2011

Following the 1997 General Election, 7% of Labour MPs were members of the Campaign Group.

Tony Blair enthusiastically carried on Kinnock's attempts to "delegitimise the left". He sought to reduce the number of left-wing Labour MPs by centralising control of candidate selections and used "open shortlists in a fast and loose way, mainly to ensure that left candidates are excluded or defeated." Labour Party historian Alex Nunns described how "Left-wing hopefuls, like Christine Shawcroft or Mark Seddon, were stopped at all costs. Party workers were tasked with personal lobbying for the leadership's preferred choice, or were even told to chase up certain postal votes but not others."

Blair's strategist Peter Mandelson reportedly described wanting the parliamentary left to become "a sealed tomb". Alan Simpson, a member of the Campaign Group during the New Labour years, described it as "the only bolt-hole of real political thought that I found throughout my parliamentary years ... they were the MPs you would always find on picket lines, at trade union and social movement rallies, on anti-war marches and at the forefront of campaigns to restore rather than exploit the planet."

==== Opposition to single parent benefit cuts ====
Under Blair, the Labour government introduced plans to cut lone parent benefit, a measure which members of the Campaign Group believed would disproportionately harm women. The cut was brought in by Harriet Harman, Secretary of State for Social Security, who championed the cut despite the majority of people affected being women and children who were already poor. Backbench Labour MPs, led by the Campaign Group, opposed these plans, speaking and voting against them in Parliament. Blair ally Patricia Hewitt was alleged to have described the rebellion as a "conspiracy organised by the Socialist Campaign Group"

47 Labour MPs voted against the proposals including Campaign Group members Ken Livingstone, Ronnie Campbell, Tony Benn, Jeremy Corbyn, Ann Cryer, Alan Simpson, John McDonnell, Dennis Skinner, Audrey Wise, and Diane Abbott. Despite the scale of the opposition from Labour MPs and campaigners, Harman continued to implement the cuts. She was sacked from Cabinet the following year.

==== Opposition to the Iraq War and founding the Stop the War Coalition ====
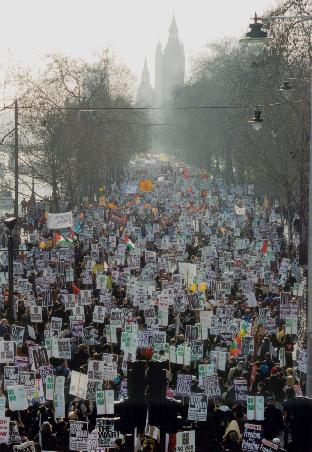
The Anti Iraq War march organised by the Stop The War Coalition in 2003

The Stop the War Coalition was founded in the weeks following 9/11, when George W. Bush announced the "War on terror", and has since campaigned to oppose and end the wars in Afghanistan, Iraq, Libya, and elsewhere. Socialist Campaign Group MPs Jeremy Corbyn and Tam Dalyell, along with Tony Benn, (who had been in the Socialist Campaign Group until he stood down as an MP at the 2001 General Election) were among the most high profile of the initial sponsors of the Stop the War Coalition at the meeting on 21 September 2001, along with figures such as Tariq Ali, Harold Pinter, Andrew Murray and Lindsey German, who became the convenor of Stop the War.

The Coalition organised what is widely thought to be the largest demonstration in British history, when on 15 February 2003, over a million people marched against the Iraq War. Campaign Group MP Alan Simpson launched Labour Against The War to coordinate parliamentary opposition to Tony Blair's decision to follow George W. Bush in invading Iraq. Although Blair was able to win these votes with the support of Conservative MPs, 139 Labour MPs voted against his plans for war, one of the largest rebellions ever seen in the Commons.

==== Opposition to academisation ====
In 2005, Blair's government announced plans to encourage every school to become an independent self-governing trust. These schools would, like academies, determine their own curriculum and ethos, appoint the governing body, control their own assets, employ their own staff and set their own admissions policy. These plans were described as intending to "all but abolish local authority involvement in state schools" and Deputy Prime Minister John Prescott argued that it would "condemn a generation of poorer children to ghettos of collapsing schools".

14 Campaign Group MPs, working with other Labour backbenchers, sought to block the plans by proposing an alternative plan for education. John McDonnell, then Chair of the Socialist Campaign Group, argued "Our sincere hope is that the prime minister desists from relying upon a [David] Cameron coalition to force his education policies through in the face of this overwhelming opposition within the parliamentary Labour party." With Tory support, the reforms were eventually passed by 422 to 98 votes; however, this was the largest rebellion a Labour government had ever suffered at the third reading of a Bill.

Members of the Campaign Group have been the first to be at the forefront of mass campaigns on trade union rights, private equity, council housing, public services and against the war ... We consistently raise uncomfortable issues and support campaigns that no other parliamentarians will touch, on issues like asylum, deportations, international trade union and human rights, campaigns for those killed or injured at work, safety of vulnerable workers, including sex workers, cuts in legal aid and English for speakers of other languages funding.

— John McDonnell, then Chair of the Socialist Campaign Group, from a letter to The Guardian, published in 2007

=== Reform 2019–present ===
While Corbyn was party leader, from 2015 to 2019, Socialist Campaign Group activity reduced as many members joined the shadow cabinet. The rule that shadow cabinet MPs could not be group members caused difficulties, and this rule was removed, allowing the group to recover to 23 members by 2019.

In January 2020, the Socialist Campaign Group was reformed. It supported Rebecca Long-Bailey for Leader and Richard Burgon for Deputy Leader in the 2020 Labour Party leadership election, which was won by Keir Starmer and Angela Rayner, respectively. In October 2020, the Socialist Campaign Group produced a pamphlet called "Winning the Future", which proposed solutions to the COVID-19 pandemic.

== Labour leadership elections ==
There have been nine Labour leadership elections since the formation of the Socialist Campaign Group: 1983, 1988, 1992, 1994, 2007, 2010, 2015, 2016, and 2020.

=== 1983 leadership election ===
The Campaign Group backed Eric Heffer and Michael Meacher in their unsuccessful bids for the leadership and deputy leadership in 1983. Tony Benn could not stand because he was not currently in Parliament at the time, having just lost his seat.

=== 1988 leadership election ===
During his time as Leader Neil Kinnock moved the Labour party to adopt centrist politics. In the 1987 general election, Margaret Thatcher's Conservatives won a landslide victory and were nearly 12% ahead of Labour in the popular vote. Following this defeat Kinnock introduced a Policy Review, which many on the left thought would lead to an abandonment of the party's commitment to Clause IV, public ownership and the transformation of society. At a meeting of the Campaign Group following this election defeat, it was agreed that Tony Benn should stand against Kinnock in a leadership election, although Benn himself was reluctant to run. The decision to run led to a number of MPs leaving the Campaign Group including Clare Short, Margaret Beckett, Jo Richardson and Joan Ruddock.

Labour's electoral college was weighted 40% to affiliated unions, 30% to Constituency Labour Parties (CLPs) and 30% to MPs in the Parliamentary Labour Party. Benn secured only 11.4% of the vote (17.2% of MPs, 19.6% of CLPs and 0.2% of affiliated unions). The scale of this defeat was a surprise to Benn, in particular the decline in support from CLPs since the 1983 election, and strengthened Kinnock's position, which he used to take the party further towards centrism. Following this election, the party rules were changed to quadruple the number of MPs required to nominate a candidate to launch a leadership challenge from 5% to 20% (lowered in 1993 to 12.5% for elections where the incumbent had resigned).

=== 1992 leadership election ===
Neil Kinnock resigned just three days after he lost his second general election, and tried to persuade candidates other than John Smith to stand aside so as to avoid a contest. Rules introduced following Tony Benn's 1988 leadership challenge meant that candidates would have to secure nominations from 55 MPs to make it onto the ballot paper. Three candidates sought nominations: John Smith, the favourite, regarded as being "from the right" of the party, Bryan Gould, from the "centre-left" and Ken Livingstone, the Campaign Group candidate.

Bernie Grant sought nominations as the Campaign Group candidate for Deputy Leader. John Prescott, Ann Clywd and Margaret Beckett were the other deputy leadership contenders. It quickly became clear that the 20% nomination threshold risked eliminating all candidates except Smith.

"The '20 per cent' rule was introduced in 1989 specifically to exclude the Campaign Group – the left – from future leadership elections. At that time the left on the NEC predicted that the new rule would rebound against democracy in the entire party – including the soft left who voted for it. As soon as it became clear that John Smith was the front runner, more and more MPs simply jumped on his bandwagon. After all the leader will be handing out front bench appointments for the rest of this Parliament! As the deadline for nominations approached it started to look as though all other candidates would be excluded – not only Livingstone and Grant but also Ann Clwyd, Bryan Gould and John Prescott."

Not only have they stitched up who will win but they have also stitched up who will lose and in what order.

— Ken Livingstone, responding to the mid-contest rule change to ensure a centre-left candidate would get onto the ballot paper

To avoid this party officials changed the rules mid-contest, at the suggestion of Gould, to allow MPs who had already nominated a candidate to withdraw and support another instead. This ensured that Gould received enough nominations to ensure a contest between him and Smith, and that Ken Livingstone and Bernie Grant were kept off the ballot. Margaret Beckett described this change as "unprecedented". John Smith won the electoral college vote against Gould with 91% of the vote.

=== 1994 leadership election ===
No candidate from the Campaign Group ran in the 1994 leadership election and the group did not endorse a candidate. However, Margaret Beckett, who had been a member of the Campaign Group until 1988, was nominated by 18 Campaign Group MPs, with 5 nominating John Prescott. Beckett's campaign was supported due to her position that Tory anti-union laws should be repealed and that anti-union changes to the party constitution should stop. No Campaign Group MPs backed Tony Blair, who went on to win the contest.

=== 2007 leadership election ===
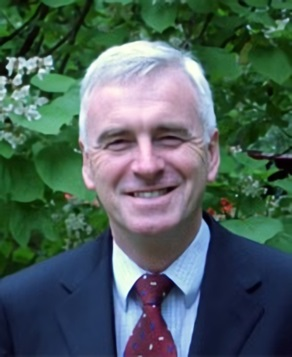
John McDonnell, who fell short of the nominations required to challenge for the Labour Party leadership in 2007.

In 2007, only 24 of 353 Labour MPs were members of the Socialist Campaign Group and party rules required nominations from 45 MPs (12.5% of the Parliamentary Labour Party) to make it onto the ballot paper.

Both John McDonnell, then Chair of the Campaign Group, and Michael Meacher, a member of the Campaign Group, sought nominations to run against Gordon Brown. Both McDonnell and Meacher agreed that whichever of them had the support of fewer Labour MPs at the point of Tony Blair's resignation would withdraw from the campaign and support the other. However, although Meacher gave his support to McDonnell following Blair's resignation not all of his supporters switched allegiance, leaving McDonnell short of the nominations required and leading to Gordon Brown becoming leader unopposed.

As part of his campaign, John McDonnell published his manifesto as a book entitled Another World Is Possible: A Manifesto for 21st Century Socialism.

=== 2010 leadership election ===
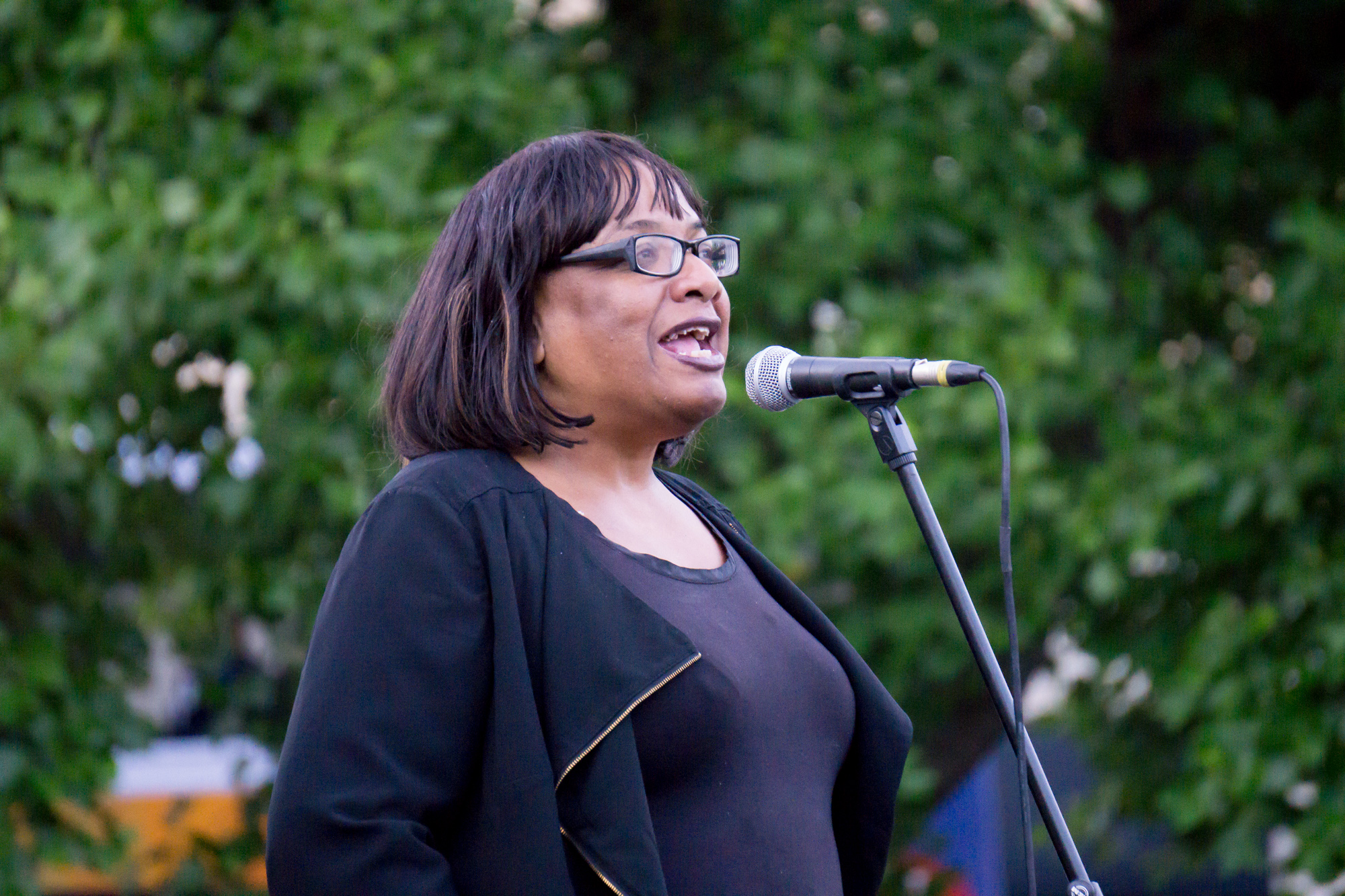
Diane Abbott, who became the first black woman to ever contest the Labour Party leadership in 2010.

In 2010 nominations from 33 MPs (12.5% of the Parliamentary Labour Party) were required to make it onto the ballot paper. Socialist Campaign Group MPs John McDonnell and Diane Abbott both sought nominations to run; however, McDonnell withdrew from the race after it became clear he would not receive sufficient nominations, and instead supported Abbott to give her the best chance of making it onto the ballot. Abbott, the first black woman to ever contest the Labour leadership, secured the necessary 33 nominations after being 'lent' nominations from a number of MPs who were not supporting her campaign but wanted to ensure that the contest was not exclusively white and male. It has been suggested that this practice of lending nominations to left candidate to widen the scope of debate "set a precedent" for Jeremy Corbyn's run for Leadership in 2015.

Despite beating both Andy Burnham and Ed Balls in total number of first preference votes cast (35,259 individual first preferences for Abbott compared to 28,772 for Burnham and 34,489 for Balls), Abbott was eliminated in the first round of voting, as she received fewer votes from MPs, and Ed Miliband went on to win the leadership election.. Abbott secured the first-preference votes of 7 MPs: Diane Abbott, Katy Clark, Jeremy Corbyn, Kelvin Hopkins, John McDonnell, Linda Riordan and Mike Wood.

=== 2015 leadership election ===
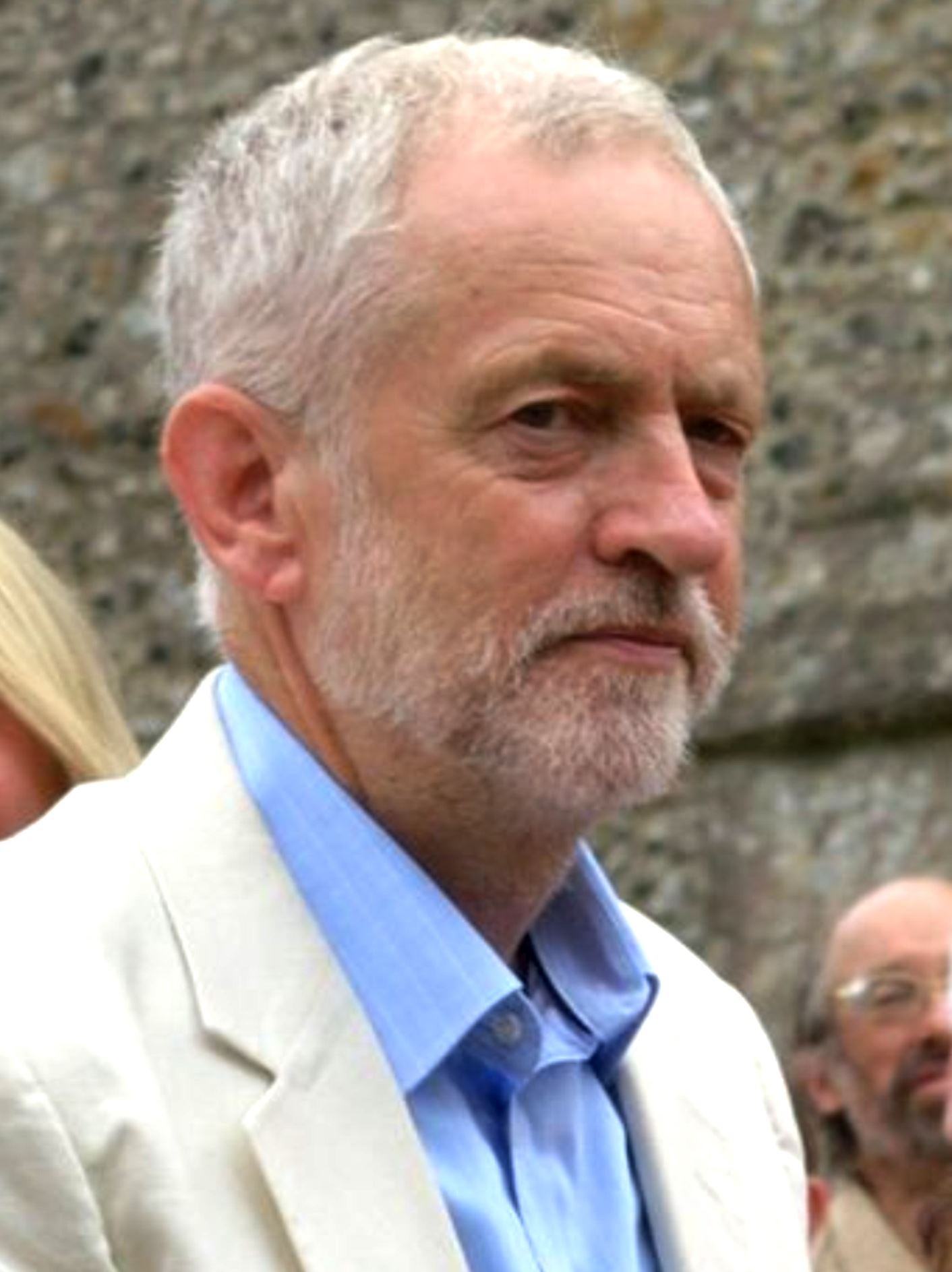
Jeremy Corbyn, the only member of the Socialist Campaign Group to become leader of the Labour Party

The 2015 leadership election was the first held under new rules introduced by Ed Miliband following the Collins Review which recommended moving to a one-member one vote (OMOV) system. This reduced the previous weighting in favour of MPs and Trade Unions. The Blairite wing of the Labour Party (including Blair himself) celebrated this reform, believing that the changes would mean that "the next Labour leader will be a Blairite". At a meeting of the Socialist Campaign Group on 3 June it was decided that, with McDonnell and Abbott both ruling themselves out after having stood previously, Jeremy Corbyn should be the left's candidate for leader. Corbyn was immediately nominated by Campaign Group MPs including John McDonnell (who became chair of his campaign), Diane Abbott, Ronnie Campbell, Kelvin Hopkins, Michael Meacher, Dennis Skinner, Richard Burgon, Clive Lewis and Cat Smith.

The campaign quickly mobilised grassroots Labour members and activists to pressure MPs to nominate Corbyn, even if they disagreed with him, in order to ensure a proper debate about the future of the Labour Party. Two minutes before the deadline Corbyn reached the threshold of 35 nominations, having been 'lent' nominations from MPs who did not support him but were persuaded to nominate him by grassroots members and Campaign Group MPs. Margaret Beckett was one of those who nominated Corbyn despite disagreeing with him, and later described herself as a "moron" for doing so. Immediately following his success in getting on the ballot Corbyn attended a protest against the treatment of women detained at Yarls Wood Detention Centre and against the 13-year detention by the US of British resident Shaker Aamer in Guantanamo Bay without charge.

Corbyn outlined an anti-austerity domestic agenda and an international agenda opposed to military intervention. He campaigned on issues with wide popular support that had been outside of the political mainstream for many years, including rail re-nationalisation, free higher education, regional investment and a higher minimum wage. On 12 September 2015 Corbyn was elected Leader of the Labour Party in a landslide victory, with 59.5% of first-preference votes.

=== 2016 leadership election ===
During the 2016 referendum Corbyn led Labour in campaigning to remain. Corbyn spoke at 15 rallies from London to Hastings to Aberdeen, reached more than 10 million people with his Remain messages on social media, made six statements in the Commons and put forward Remain arguments during interviews on Sky, BBC, ITV and Channel 4. Analysis from academics at Loughborough University found that the BBC had excluded Labour voices during the campaign and instead covered the campaign as a Conservative Party civil war.

When the result of the referendum was announced Corbyn's opponents on the right and centre of the Parliamentary Labour Party sought to trigger a leadership election on the grounds that they did not think he had campaigned sufficiently vigorously for Remain. MPs hostile to Corbyn leaked internal emails to the BBC which showed that Corbyn's team had resisted moves to pursue a more hostile line on immigration and suggested that this was evidence that Corbyn had sought to "sabotage" the remain campaign. Anti-Corbyn MPs had been briefing the media "for months to "expect movement" against Corbyn on 24 June", suggesting that the opposition to Corbyn was not primarily motivated by his actions during the referendum. In the days following the referendum a number of Corbyn's critics resigned from the Shadow Cabinet and the parliamentary party passed a vote of no confidence in Corbyn by 172 votes against to 40 for. Corbyn promoted a number of Campaign Group MPs to fill his Shadow Cabinet including Richard Burgon, Rebecca Long-Bailey, Grahame Morris and Clive Lewis, and with their support along with that of other left wing MPs and the mobilisation of members by Momentum Corbyn refused to resign. Owen Smith secured the required nominations to run against him. Corbyn's opponents in the National Executive Committee were alleged by Robert Peston to have sought to fix the results, by increasing the fee for becoming a registered supporter from £3 to £25 and excluding from voting the 130,000 new members who had joined in the previous 6 months.

On 24 September 2016, Corbyn was re-elected Leader of the Labour Party in another landslide victory, increasing his share of the vote from 59.5% to 61.8%.

=== 2020 leadership election ===
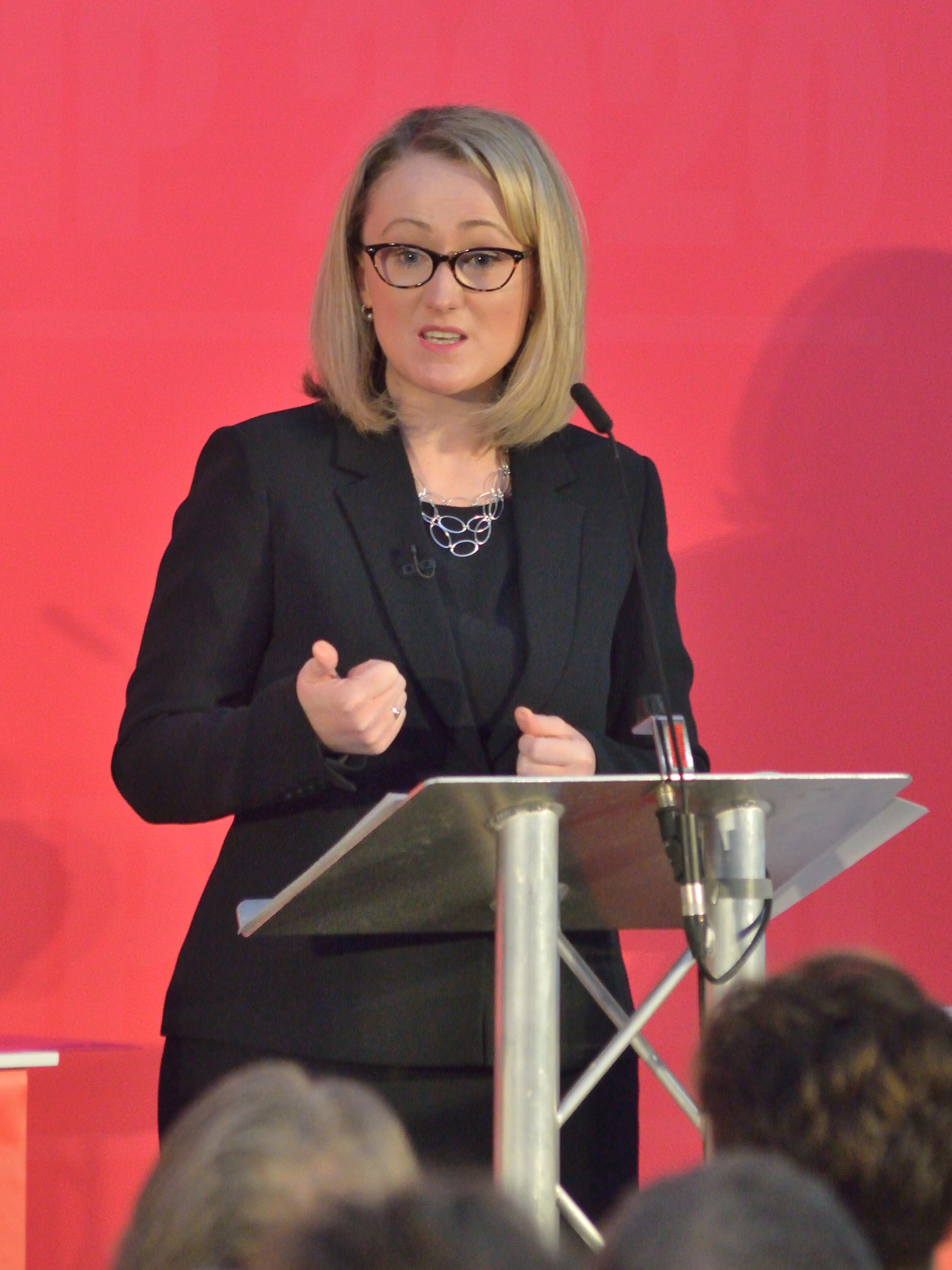
Long-Bailey during a leadership election hustings in Bristol

Following the 2019 general election, the Socialist Campaign Group reformed for 2019–2024. Campaign Group members Rebecca Long-Bailey and Richard Burgon ran for leader and deputy leader of the Labour Party, respectively. Both were defeated by Keir Starmer and Angela Rayner, respectively.

== Views ==
Although the Campaign Group did not require members to adhere to a particular set of policies, the group did occasionally set out statements of principle. The February 1988 edition of Campaign Group News included "The Aims and Objectives of the Labour Party" a statement agreed by the Campaign Group of Labour MPs and circulated "to provide a focus for political discussion and education within the party ... and to be the basis of our long-term political work". The statement set out the ideological basis for Benn's 1988 campaign to be Labour leader. The document outlines a socialist, internationalist, and democratic agenda and starts by listing the rights that members thought out to be fought for:

"WE BELIEVE: That there should be certain rights which must be won and maintained:

- The right to life, free from fear, oppression, ignorance, preventable ill-health or poverty.
- The right to useful and satisfying work, balanced with leisure, to meet the needs of society.
- The right of everyone to receive an income sufficient to maintain a decent standard of living.
- The right to a good home for all in which to live, bring up children and care for all dependents.
- The right to receive the best possible medical care, free, and at the moment of need.
- The right of access, throughout life, to the full range of human knowledge, through education at school, in college and afterwards.
- The right to mass media which provides accurate news, free from bias or distortion, and a diversity of views.
- The right to enjoy dignity, and a full life, in retirement in suitable accommodation, free from financial anxieties, with proper medical, and other, facilities, including personal care, necessary to make that possible.
- The right to expect that any government in power will work for peace and justice, and will not provoke international conflict or hostility or divert resources from essential purposes to build up the weapons of mass destruction.
- The right to equality of treatment under just laws, free from all discrimination based upon class, sex, race, life-style or beliefs.
- The right of free speech and assembly, the entrenchment of civil liberties and human rights and the right to organise voluntary associations and free trade unions for the purpose of protecting and improving the prospects for those who belong to them, and in particular, the right to withdraw labour as a means of securing justice."

== Campaign Group News ==
We need a campaign for peace and disarmament in Europe, and for an end to the arms trade throughout the world and for a new international economic order which will start to reverse the transfer of wealth from the poorest to the richest. Until that is done the Gulf War will be the first of many such wars where Western countries declare war on Third World countries, allegedly for reasons of international law but in reality for an unjust economic order and against people attempting to claim their right to self-determination – like the Kurds.

— Jeremy Corbyn, writing in Campaign Group News about the plight of Kurdish people during the Gulf War

First published in March 1986, Socialist Campaign Group News was the monthly magazine of the Campaign Group. The paper published articles by Campaign Group MPs alongside left wing Labour Party activists and trade unionists. Issues regularly covered included: women's liberation, Black Sections, international liberation struggles, internal Labour Party democracy and elections, reports from the National Executive Committee, proposed resolutions for Labour Party Conference, socialist economic policy, disabled people's rights, Northern Ireland and the Conservative Party.

As of 2008 the editorial board was Jim Mortimer (chair), Diane Abbott MP, Tony Benn, Jeremy Corbyn MP, Anni Marjoram, Bill Michie MP and Pete Willsman. A website of the same name, providing electronic versions of some of the articles in the printed edition and lists of Campaign Group MPs, was run from 1999 to 2010.

== Membership ==
=== Current members ===
Before 2017, the Campaign Group was only open to backbench MPs; this was reformed to allow all Members of Parliament to be members.

The following 25 MPs are currently listed as members:

- Diane Abbott (since 1987)
- Tahir Ali (since 2019)
- Apsana Begum (since 2019)
- Olivia Blake (since 2019)
- Richard Burgon (since 2015)
- Dawn Butler (since 2005)
- Ian Byrne (since 2019)
- Marsha de Cordova (since 2017)
- Mary Kelly Foy (since 2019)
- Imran Hussain (since 2015)
- Kim Johnson (since 2019)
- Ian Lavery (since 2010)
- Brian Leishman (since 2024)
- Clive Lewis (since 2015)
- Rebecca Long-Bailey (since 2015)
- Rachael Maskell (since 2015)
- Andy McDonald (since 2012)
- John McDonnell (since 1997)
- Grahame Morris (since 2010)
- Kate Osborne (since 2019)
- Kate Osamor (since 2015)
- Bell Ribeiro-Addy (since 2019)
- Jon Trickett (since 1996)
- Nadia Whittome (since 2019)
- Steve Witherden (since 2024)

=== Former members ===
==== Deceased ====
The following died while still serving in Parliament:

- Bob McTaggart (d. 1989)
- Allan Roberts (d. 1990)
- Pat Wall (d. 1990)
- Eric Heffer (d. 1991)
- Bob Cryer (d. 1994)
- Bernie Grant (d. 2000)
- Audrey Wise (d. 2000)
- Tony Banks (d. 2006)
- David Taylor (d. 2009)

==== Left Parliament ====
These members left Parliament voluntarily, either to retire or for new opportunities elsewhere:

- Joan Maynard (1987)
- Stuart Holland (1989)
- Bob Clay (1992)
- Martin Flannery (1992)
- Don Dixon (1997)
- Bob Litherland (1997)
- Eddie Loyden (1997)
- William McKelvey (1997)
- Robert Parry (1997)
- Tony Benn (2001)
- Maria Fyfe (2001)
- Tess Kingham (2001)
- John McAllion (2001)
- Bill Michie (2001)
- Harry Barnes (2005)
- Harold Best (2005)
- Tam Dalyell (2005)
- Terence Lewis (2005)
- Alice Mahon (2005)
- Llew Smith (2005)
- Jimmy Wray (2005)
- Ernie Ross (2005)
- John Austin (2010)
- Michael Clapham (2010)
- Harry Cohen (2010)
- Ann Cryer (2010)
- Bill Etherington (2010)
- Neil Gerrard (2010)
- Lynne Jones (2010)
- Bob Marshall-Andrews (2010)
- Alan Simpson (2010)
- Martin Caton (2015)
- David Hamilton (2015)
- Austin Mitchell (2015)
- Linda Riordan (2015)
- Mike Wood (2015)
- Ronnie Campbell (2019)
- Ian Mearns (2024)

==== Constituencies abolished ====
These members left the Commons following the abolition of their constituencies as a result of redrawing of boundaries:

- Les Huckfield (1983)
- Andrew McMahon (1983)
- Reg Race (1983)
- John Tilley (1983)
- Mildred Gordon (1997)
- Mick Whitley (2024)
- Beth Winter (2024)

==== Lost seat in general election ====
These members lost their seats in general elections:

- Tony Benn (1983, returned 1984)
- Bob Cryer (1983, returned 1987)
- Eileen Gordon (2001)
- John Cryer (2005, returned 2010)
- Phil Sawford (2005)
- David Drew (2010, returned 2017, lost seat again in 2019)
- Katy Clark (2015)
- Emma Dent Coad (2019)
- Karen Lee (2019)
- Laura Pidcock (2019)
- Danielle Rowley (2019)
- Dennis Skinner (2019)
- Laura Smith (2019)
- Chris Williamson (2015, returned 2017, suspended then lost seat in 2019)

==== Expelled ====
The following members were expelled from the Labour Party:

- Ron Brown (1991 – convicted of criminal damage)
- Dennis Canavan (2000 – ran as an independent for the Scottish Parliament)
- Terry Fields (1991 – member of the Militant tendency)
- Dave Nellist (1991 – member of the Militant tendency)
- Ken Livingstone (2000 – ran as an independent for Mayor of London; later readmitted)
- Claudia Webbe (2021 – criminally convicted for harassment; had been suspended in 2020)
- Jeremy Corbyn (2024 – stood as an independent in the 2024 general election)

==== Deselected ====
The following members were deselected by their Constituency Labour Parties:

- Norman Atkinson (desel. 1987)
- Ernie Roberts (desel. 1987)
- John Hughes (desel. 1992)
- Bob Wareing (desel. 2007)
- Frank Cook (desel. 2008)
- Ian Gibson (desel. 2009)
- Sam Tarry (desel. 2022)
- Lloyd Russell-Moyle (inel. 2024, having been suspended)

==== Defected ====
- Brian Sedgemore (2005, to the Liberal Democrats)
- Zarah Sultana (2025, to Your Party)

==== Resigned ====
The following members resigned their membership of the Campaign Group in 1985 in a show of support for Neil Kinnock's reforms:

- Kevin Barron
- Derek Fatchett

The following members resigned their membership of the Campaign Group in 1988 in protest at Tony Benn's decision to challenge Neil Kinnock for the Labour leadership that year:

- Margaret Beckett
- Jo Richardson
- Joan Ruddock
- Clare Short
- Joan Walley

The following members resigned their membership of the Campaign Group at various points in time when they became front bench spokespersons or members of the government, which was seen as incompatible with membership of the Campaign Group until 2017:

- Michael Meacher (front bench 1983)
- Ray Powell (front bench 1983)
- Mark Fisher (front bench 1987)
- Paul Boateng (front bench 1989)
- Gavin Strang (front bench 1992)
- Malcolm Chisholm (government 1997)
- Chris Mullin (government 1997)
- Dawn Primarolo (government 1997, but remained a member until 2000)
- Dave Anderson (government 2006)
- John Cryer (front bench 2012 – as Chair of the Parliamentary Labour Party)
- Kelvin Hopkins (front bench 2016, whip suspended 2017)
- Jeremy Corbyn (party leader 2015)

The following members resigned their membership of the Campaign Group for other reasons:

- Alan Meale (1987)
- Gerry Bermingham (1991)
- Terry Patchett (1991)
- Keith Vaz (1991)
- Jimmy Hood (1997)
- Paula Barker (by 2024).
- Dan Carden (by 2024).
- Rachel Hopkins (by 2024).
- Navendu Mishra (by 2024).

== See also ==
- British left
- Campaign for Labour Party Democracy
- Labour Party Black Sections
- Labour Representation Committee
