= 1988 Labour Party leadership election (UK) =

- 2 October 1988
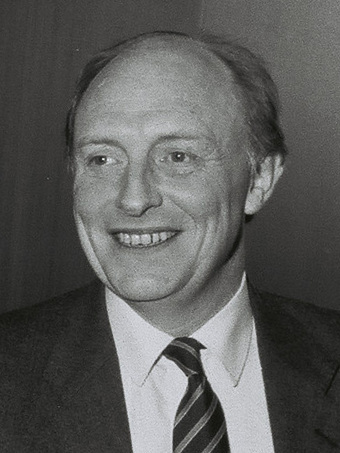

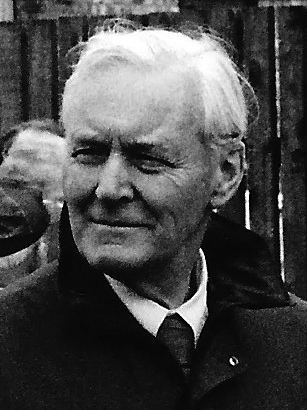
Candidate	Neil Kinnock	Tony Benn
Overall result	88.6%	11.4%
Affiliated unions	99.2%	0.8%
Party members	80.4%	19.6%
Labour MPs	82.8%	17.2%
Leader before election
Neil Kinnock
Elected Leader
Neil Kinnock

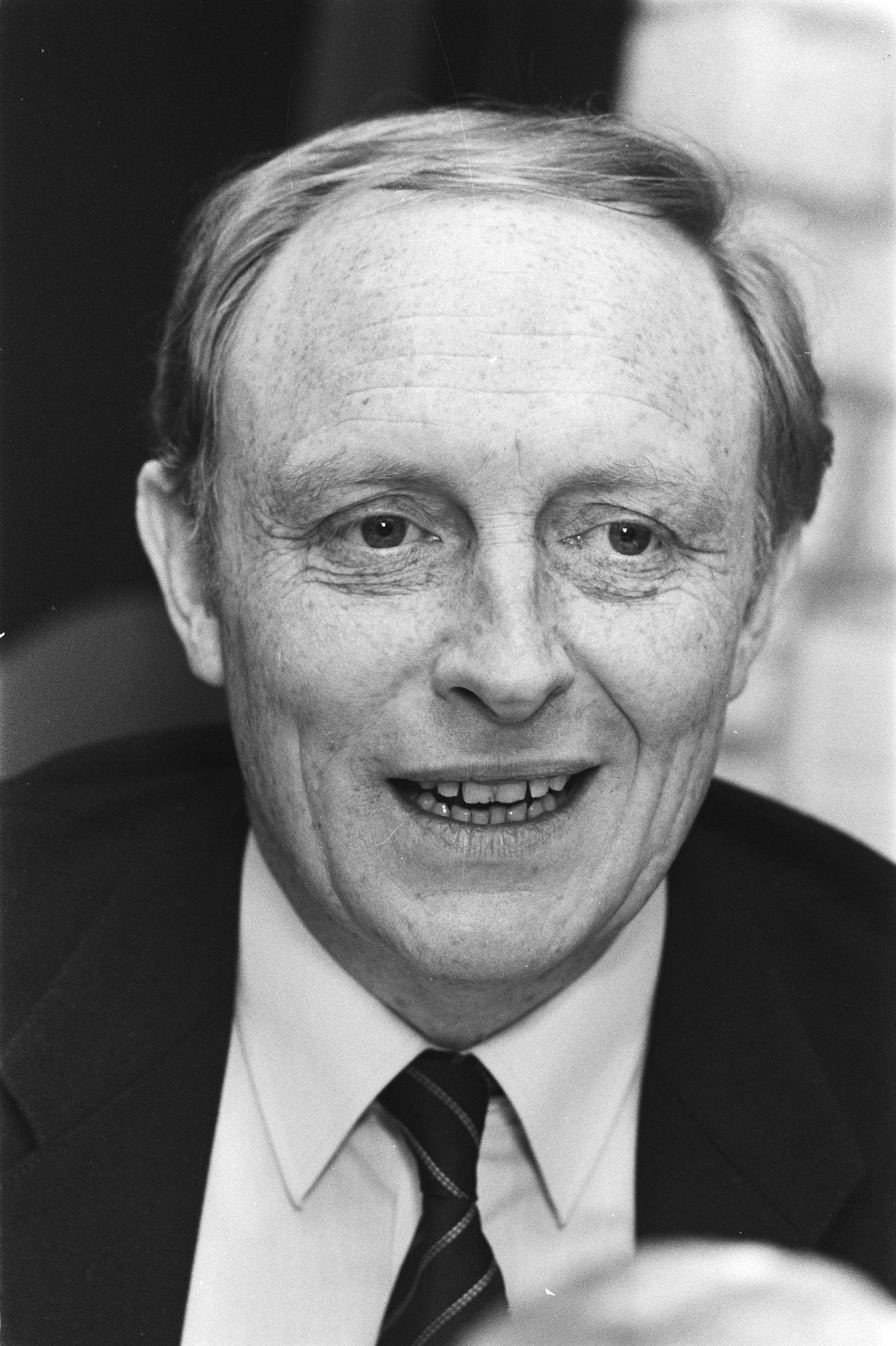

The 1988 Labour Party leadership election saw Tony Benn, identified with the left wing of the British Labour Party, challenge the incumbent leader Neil Kinnock identified with the more moderate social democratic wing.

Kinnock won the election with 89% of the vote and remained Leader until 1992, when he resigned the leadership following Labour's defeat in the 1992 United Kingdom general election.

The election took place at Labour Party conference, with affiliated trade unions holding 40% of the votes, delegates from Constituency Labour Parties holding 30% of the votes, and the Parliamentary Labour Party holding the final 30% of the votes.

== Background ==
Neil Kinnock became leader of the Labour Party in 1983 following the resignation of Michael Foot. The party had been moving towards the left, something that Kinnock sought to change. At the 1987 general election, Kinnock was placed front and centre of the Labour campaign, leading to claims that it was almost presidential. Margaret Thatcher's Conservative Party, seven points ahead in the polls, won the election despite a 1.2% swing to Labour.

Rumours were spreading early in 1988 that Tony Benn was planning a leadership challenge against Kinnock. The 63-year-old Benn had lost his seat in Labour's disastrous performance at the 1983 general election, only to return to parliament within a year after winning the Chesterfield by-election. During the 1960s and 1970s he had been a cabinet minister in the governments of Harold Wilson and James Callaghan. In 1981, with Labour in opposition and reeling from the centrist split from the party which led to the creation of the SDP, he had narrowly failed to defeat Denis Healey for the deputy leadership of the party.

The deputy leadership was also expected to be challenged, as John Prescott, having been made Shadow Secretary of State for Energy, was dissatisfied with his shadow cabinet position and spoke of challenging the incumbent Roy Hattersley. Kinnock responded to the rumours regarding Benn's challenge, calling his supporters "self-enthroned revolutionaries" and a potential challenge a "ridiculous diversion".

== Candidates ==
- Neil Kinnock, incumbent Leader of the Labour Party, Member of Parliament for Islwyn
- Tony Benn, former Secretary of State for Energy, Member of Parliament for Chesterfield

Benn and Kinnock were the only two candidates in the election. Benn's supporters had hoped that launching the leadership challenge would encourage others to step forward and increase the number of candidates involved. They specifically wanted John Smith, the Shadow Chancellor of the Exchequer, to challenge Kinnock as well. At the same time as the leadership challenge, the deputy leadership was contested by the incumbent, Roy Hattersley, John Prescott and Eric Heffer, part of the same left-wing ticket as Benn.

== Campaign ==
The campaign lasted for eight months in the run-up to the Labour Party conference in October 1988. Benn opened his campaign on 3 February, calling it a "campaign for socialism" and saying "I genuinely do not believe the Labour Party is electable if we pursue the present course." His supporters launched their own manifesto, "Aims and Objectives of the Labour Party". But there was not full support on the left of the party, with David Blunkett saying that the result of a challenge would certainly be defeat for any candidate, and would give Kinnock an air of "omnipotence" with victory. Following the launch of a manifesto by Kinnock and Hattersley, which was opposed by Benn, Ken Livingstone and Dennis Skinner, Benn made his official challenge for the Labour leadership. Kinnock called the challenge "futile and selfish".

Following the announcement of the challenge, there was some dissent from parts of the left within the party with Clare Short describing it as a "waste of time". Benn's candidacy led to a split in the left-wing Socialist Campaign Group, with Short resigning from the group alongside Margaret Beckett, Jo Richardson, Joan Ruddock and Joan Walley in protest at Benn's decision. The Amalgamated Engineering Union announced that it would deduct the cost of polling its members from the overall donations that would normally go to the party. Overall, it was expected that the cost of the leadership contest for the party would be in the region of £500,000. Kinnock announced that only 15 MPs had backed the challenge, a claim which was disputed by Benn's backers. There was also a fear that the leadership challenge would decrease the party's following in the polls, as had happened during Benn's challenge for the deputy leadership in 1981.

Kinnock urged Benn to give up the contest at the start of April, which was rejected. Kinnock began to gather the support of the unions, with the National Union of Mineworkers supporting him instead of Benn, resulting in the press calling his challenge a "lost cause". Kinnock and Benn also had opposing views on defence, specifically a nuclear deterrent. In May, Kinnock postponed any decision for a year, which Benn called a "backwards step" and Dennis Skinner described as "probably the biggest socialist sell-out of the century".

In an attempt to take the party back to socialism, Benn threatened that defeat would not be the end, and he would see that a challenge would come on a yearly basis, even it was not by himself. Kinnock's supporters were concerned at the destabilising effect this would cause for the party. During the latter stages of the campaign, Benn and Heffer were prepared for defeat. While at a rally on the day before the vote, Benn said "I do not want anyone to think that tomorrow is the end. It is the beginning. It is twice as good as we thought it might be. We are changing the agenda of British politics."

== Result ==
The ballot took place on 2 October 1988, at the opening session of the Labour Party annual conference in Blackpool. Affiliated organisations had 40% of the vote, while Constituency Labour Parties and the Parliamentary Labour Party had 30% each in the electoral college.

Candidate	Affiliated block votes (40%)		CLP block votes (30%)		PLP votes (30%)		Overall result
Candidate	Votes	%	Votes	%	Votes	%	%
Neil Kinnock ✓	5,605	99.2	489	80.4	183	82.8	88.6
Tony Benn	48	0.8	119	19.6	38	17.2	11.4

== Aftermath ==
Kinnock's supporters were surprised by the size of their victory over Benn and the left of the party, although they expected a further leadership challenge in the following year. Based on the percentages, 183 Members of Parliament supported Kinnock, while Benn was backed by 38. With a clear majority, Kinnock remained leader of the Labour Party. In the deputy leadership election, the incumbent deputy, Roy Hattersley, was victorious. In a television interview on the night of the victory, Kinnock said it was "a very positive vote for unity and for change", as he intended to use the vote as a mandate for policy changes he sought to bring in.

Kinnock and Hattersley remained as leader and deputy leader respectively through the 1992 general election. After Labour was defeated in the polls, Kinnock announced his resignation on 13 April 1992, and Hattersley followed shortly afterwards. Kinnock blamed the defeat on pro-Conservative media, but both remained in post until July when their replacements were chosen. John Smith was overwhelmingly elected as Kinnock's successor, and led the party until his death in 1994.

== See also ==
- 1988 Labour Party deputy leadership election
