= 1983 Labour Party leadership election (UK) =

- 2 October 1983
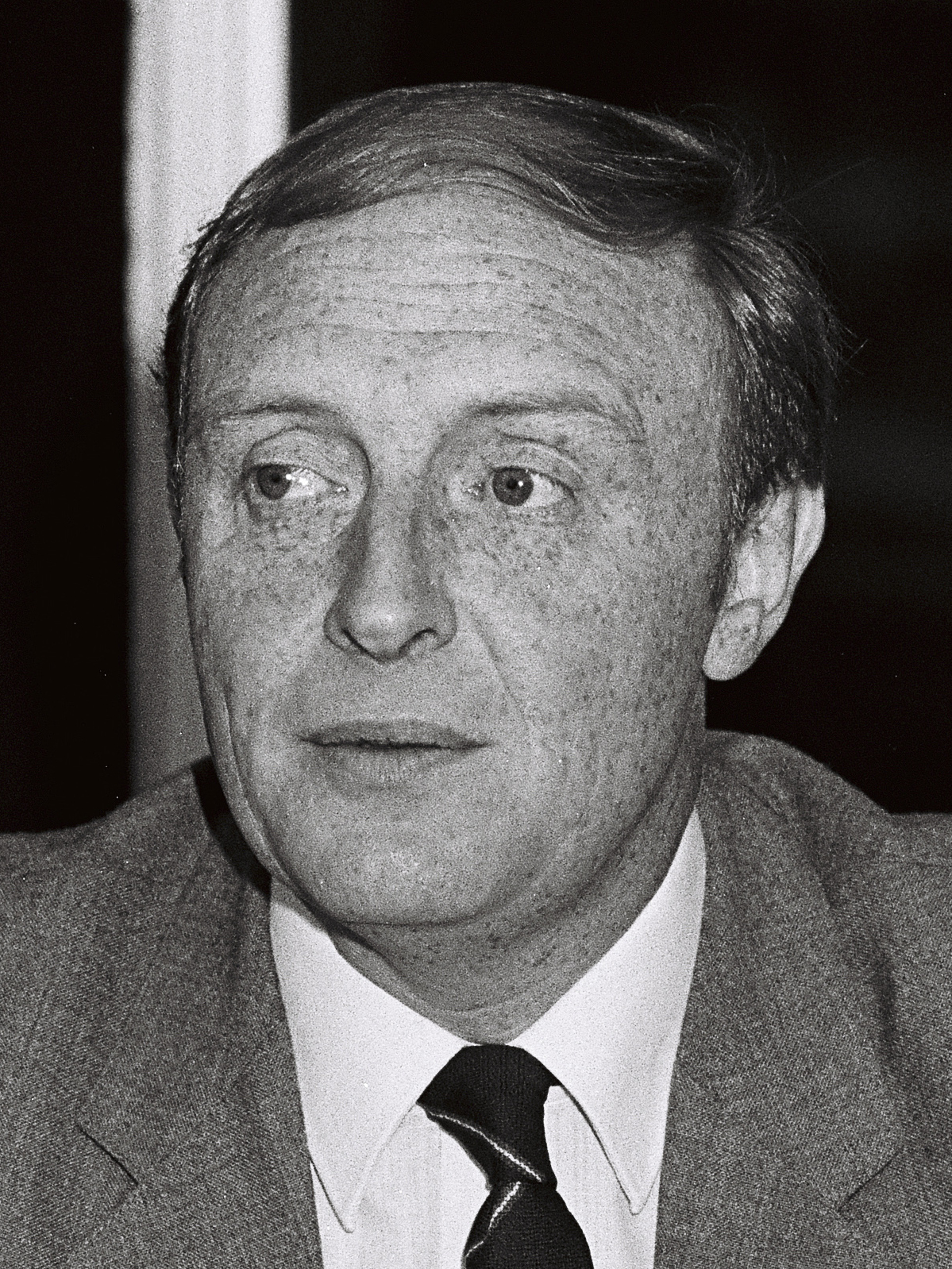

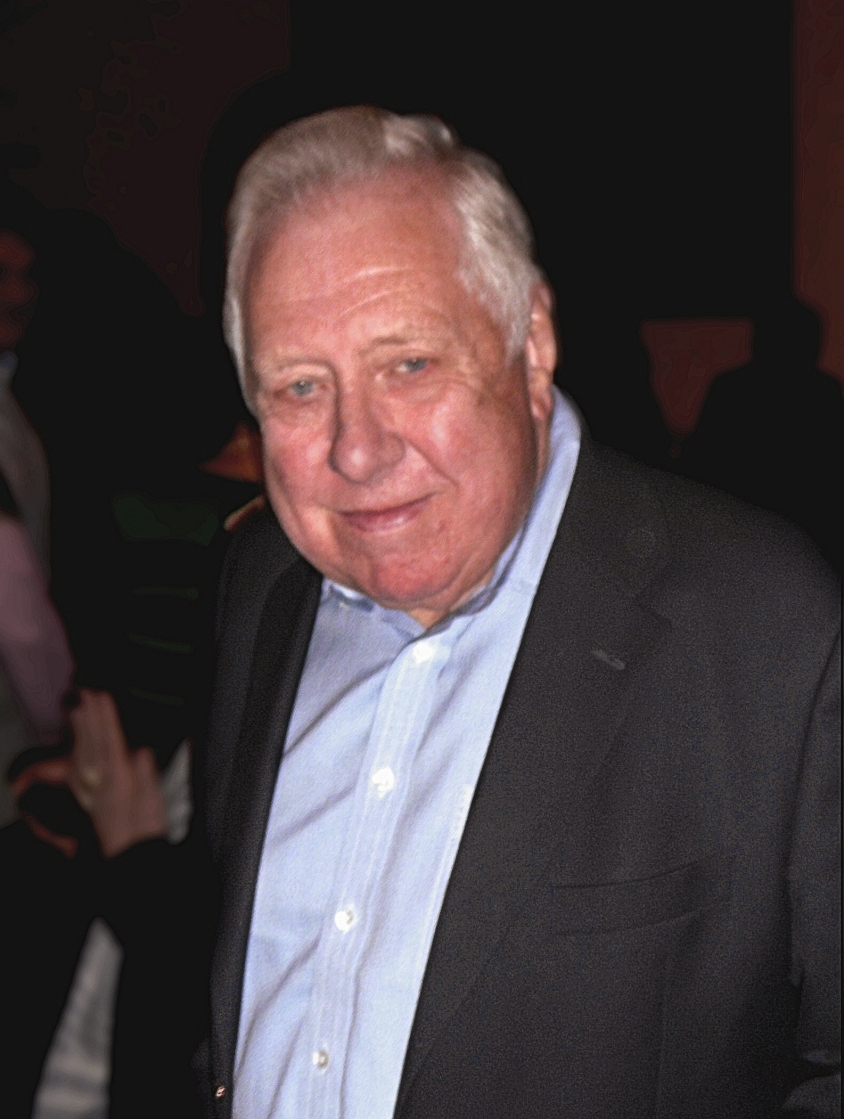
Candidate	Neil Kinnock	Roy Hattersley
Overall result	71.3%	19.3%
Affiliated unions	72.6%	27.2%
Party members	91.5%	1.9%
Labour MPs	49.3%	26.1%
Candidate	Eric Heffer	Peter Shore
Overall result	6.3%	3.1%
Affiliated unions	0.1%	0.1%
Party members	6.6%	—
Labour MPs	14.3%	10.3%
Leader before election
Michael Foot
Elected Leader
Neil Kinnock

The 1983 Labour Party leadership election was an election in the United Kingdom for the leadership of the Labour Party. It occurred when Michael Foot resigned as Leader after the party won only 209 seats at the 1983 general election, a loss of 60 seats from its performance at the previous election four years earlier. This was the worst showing for Labour since 1935. It remained the party's worst showing until 2019.

Neil Kinnock was elected Leader with 71% of the Electoral College vote; runner-up Roy Hattersley stood simultaneously for Deputy Leader, to which position he was elected.

The election took place at the Labour Party Conference, with affiliated trade unions holding 40% of the votes, delegates from Constituency Labour Parties holding 30% of the votes, and the Parliamentary Labour Party holding the final 30% of the votes.

== Background ==
Soon after the 1983 general election defeat it became clear that there was pressure on Foot to resign. David Basnett, chairman of Trade Unions for Labour Victory, which had funded the campaign, argued for a quick announcement on the future of the leadership, saying: "the sooner it is done the better". On 12 June 1983, three days after the general election, Clive Jenkins announced, on behalf of the Association of Scientific, Technical and Managerial Staffs, that his union had nominated Foot for re-election. This allowed Foot to refuse and declare his intention to stand down.

Early speculation days after the election saw the possible candidates as Denis Healey, Neil Kinnock, Roy Hattersley, Gerald Kaufman and Peter Shore. However, almost immediately after Foot announced his intention to resign, Clive Jenkins announced that his union had switched its nomination to Kinnock, which he accepted. Other union leaders contributed support for Kinnock and Hattersley. David Basnett stated on Channel 4: "I will tell you who I think ought to be the leadership team – it ought to be Kinnock and Hattersley"; Gavin Laird, general secretary of the Amalgamated Union of Engineering Workers, backed Hattersley for the leadership with Kinnock as his deputy.

Shortly after Foot's decision to stand down became known, Denis Healey, the Deputy Leader of the party, announced he too would resign from his position and would not seek to become party leader. However, he confirmed he intended to continue to play a leading role in the House of Commons and that he would seek election to the Shadow Cabinet. Another potential candidate, Tony Benn, was ruled out of the running, for only MPs were eligible to stand for the position. Benn was out of Parliament, having lost his seat at the general election a few days earlier.

== Candidates ==
- Roy Hattersley – Shadow Home Secretary, Member of Parliament for Birmingham Sparkbrook
- Eric Heffer – Shadow Minister for Europe, Member of Parliament for Liverpool Walton
- Neil Kinnock – Shadow Secretary of State for Education, Member of Parliament for Islwyn
- Peter Shore – Shadow Chancellor of the Exchequer, Member of Parliament for Bethnal Green and Stepney

== Results ==
Of the four contenders who stood to replace Foot, Kinnock was favoured to win. The results of the election, held at the Labour Party Conference, were:

Candidate	Affiliated block votes (40%)		CLP block votes (30%)		PLP votes (30%)		Overall result
Candidate	Votes	%	Votes	%	Votes	%	%
Neil Kinnock ✓	4,389	72.6	571	91.5	100	49.3	71.3
Roy Hattersley	1,644	27.2	12	1.9	53	26.1	19.3
Eric Heffer	7	0.1	41	6.6	29	14.3	6.3
Peter Shore	5	0.1	0	0.0	21	10.3	3.1

Neil Kinnock won the election with an outright majority; Roy Hattersley became his deputy (see 1983 Labour Party deputy leadership election), beating Michael Meacher. As Leader, Kinnock fought two general elections, both unsuccessfully. Labour was again beaten by a landslide at the 1987 general election despite gaining some seats, and suffered a fourth successive (though this time much closer) defeat at the 1992 election. Kinnock resigned as leader shortly afterwards, paving the way for John Smith.

== Aftermath ==
Neil Kinnock’s decisive first-ballot victory was widely interpreted as an attempt to restore unity and electoral credibility following Labour’s heavy defeat in the 1983 general election. Roy Hattersley’s election as deputy leader over the left-wing candidate Michael Meacher was secured after key trade unions, notably the Transport and General Workers' Union, shifted support toward the Kinnock–Hattersley “dream ticket” in the belief that it offered the best prospect of returning Labour to government.

However, Kinnock immediately faced internal conflict over defence policy. Within hours of his election, the party’s National Executive Committee endorsed a resolution reaffirming Labour’s commitment to unconditional unilateral nuclear disarmament, despite Kinnock’s attempt to secure its remission. The episode was described as the first test—and setback—of his leadership.

Commentary in The Times suggested that Labour’s broader challenge lay in reconciling its socialist programme with the electoral preferences of the British public, and that Kinnock’s success would depend on moderating policy while maintaining party unity.

== See also ==
- 1983 Labour Party deputy leadership election
