= 1981 Labour Party deputy leadership election =

- 27 September 1981
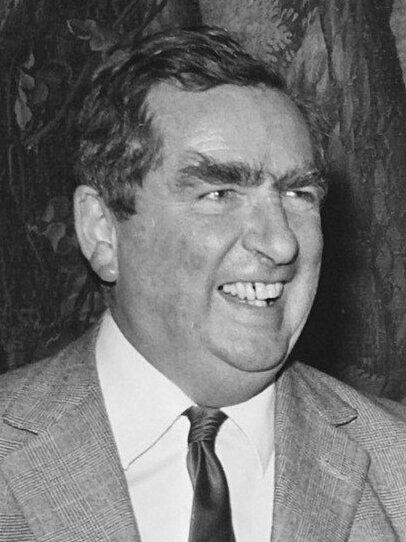

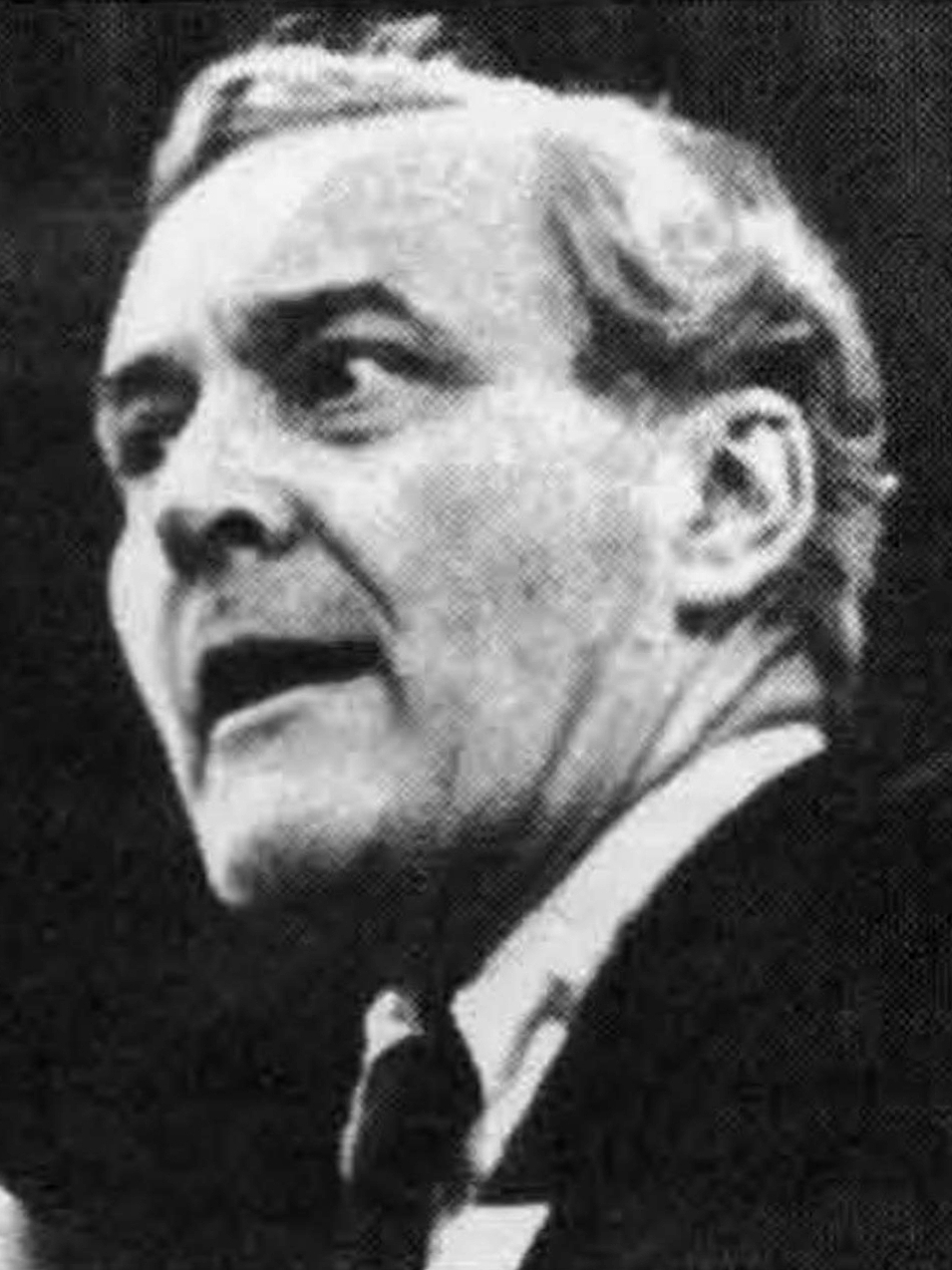

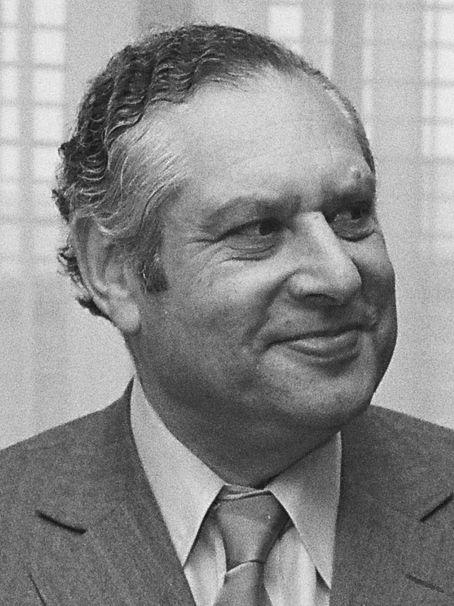
Candidate	Denis Healey	Tony Benn	John Silkin
First ballot	45.4%	36.6%	18.0%
Second ballot	50.4%	49.6%	Eliminated
Deputy Leader before election
Denis Healey
Elected Deputy Leader
Denis Healey

The 1981 Labour Party deputy leadership election took place on 27 September 1981 when Tony Benn unsuccessfully challenged the incumbent deputy leader Denis Healey at the party conference. Healey had been elected unopposed as deputy leader in the previous year.

The election took place at the Labour Party conference, with affiliated trade unions holding 40% of the votes, delegates from Constituency Labour Parties holding 30% of the votes, and the Parliamentary Labour Party holding the final 30% of the votes.

== Candidates ==
- Denis Healey, incumbent Deputy Leader, Member of Parliament for Leeds East
- Tony Benn, former Secretary of State for Energy, Member of Parliament for Bristol South East
- John Silkin, Shadow Leader of the House of Commons, Member of Parliament for Lewisham Deptford

It was the first election to take place using the party's electoral college. At this time 40% of the votes were given to affiliated unions and societies, and 30% each to the Parliamentary Labour Party and delegates representing individual members and activists of the party via their local Constituency Labour Parties (CLP). When this plurality in favour of the unions was first introduced, it received considerable criticism from the more social democratic wing of the party. It transpired it was the union ("Affiliated") block that provided a majority for Denis Healey, and had its share of the vote been equal to that of the PLP and the party membership (via the CLPs) then Healey's narrow majority would have been wiped out and the more left-wing Benn would have won the contest. The challenge for the deputy leadership of the party came a year after the election of Michael Foot as leader, which had seen the party shift to the left and resulted in a split which had created the SDP, who in turn had formed an alliance with the Liberal Party to appeal to centrist voters.

== Results ==
First round
Candidate	Affiliated block votes (40%)		CLP block votes (30%)		PLP votes (30%)		Overall result
Candidate	Votes	%	Votes	%	Votes	%	%
Denis Healey	3,968	61.7	112	17.9	125	51.0	45.4
Tony Benn	1,030	16.0	490	78.3	55	22.4	36.6
John Silkin ✗	1,429	22.2	24	3.8	65	26.5	18.0

Second round
Candidate	Affiliated block votes (40%)		CLP block votes (30%)		PLP votes (30%)		Overall result
Candidate	Votes	%	Votes	%	Votes	%	%
Denis Healey ✓	3,969	62.5	118	18.9	137	65.9	50.4
Tony Benn	2,383	37.5	506	81.1	71	34.1	49.6

== In popular culture ==
A documentary, This Week: Benn's Bandwagon was first shown on 28 April 1981, in the second month of the contest and at the point when it began to dawn on the pundits that Tony Benn was going to come close to winning.

== Legacy ==
Healey's victory has been seen as a significant moment in the history of the Labour Party. Future Labour leader and Prime Minister Tony Blair said after Healey's death that "in winning the deputy leadership of the Labour Party in 1981, he probably saved the Labour Party as an instrument of government and social change". Steve Richards notes that in the event of a Benn victory the SDP hoped to attract a number of significant defectors from the Labour Party and argues that while not obvious in 1981 the victory of Healey "marked the beginning of the end for the SDP".
