= 1983 Labour Party Shadow Cabinet election =

UK political party election

Elections to the Labour Party's Shadow Cabinet (more formally, its "Parliamentary Committee") were announced on 28 October 1983. In addition to the 15 members elected, the Leader (Neil Kinnock), Deputy Leader (Roy Hattersley), Labour Chief Whip (Michael Cocks), Labour Leader in the House of Lords (Lord Cledwyn of Penrhos), and Chairman of the Parliamentary Labour Party (Jack Dormand) were automatically members.

Denis Healey, who had previously been automatically a shadow cabinet member as Deputy Leader, topped the poll. Robin Cook, Michael Meacher and Giles Radice joined the cabinet; Jones and Meacher had not stood in 1982.

Rank	Prior rank	Candidate	Constituency	Votes
1	N/A	Denis Healey	Leeds East	136
2	1	Gerald Kaufman	Manchester Gorton	128
3	3	Peter Shore	Bethnal Green and Stepney	113
4	8	John Smith	Monklands East	97
5		Jack Cunningham	Copeland	89
6		John Prescott	Kingston upon Hull East	88
7	7	John Silkin	Lewisham Deptford	86
8	9	Peter Archer	Warley West	81
9	N/A	Barry Jones	Alyn and Deeside	80
10	17	Robin Cook	Livingston	78
11	13?	Eric Heffer	Liverpool Walton	74
12=	12?	Gwyneth Dunwoody	Crewe and Nantwich	73
12=	N/A	Michael Meacher	Oldham West	73
12=		Giles Radice	North Durham	73
15	10	Stan Orme	Salford East	72
16	?	Brynmor John	Pontypridd	71
17	12	Bruce Millan	Glasgow Govan	69
18		Jeff Rooker	Birmingham Perry Barr	66
19		Denzil Davies	Llanelli	65

== Footnotes ==
Notes
