= 1920 New Zealand Labour Party leadership election =

New Zealand party leadership election

- 24 June 1920
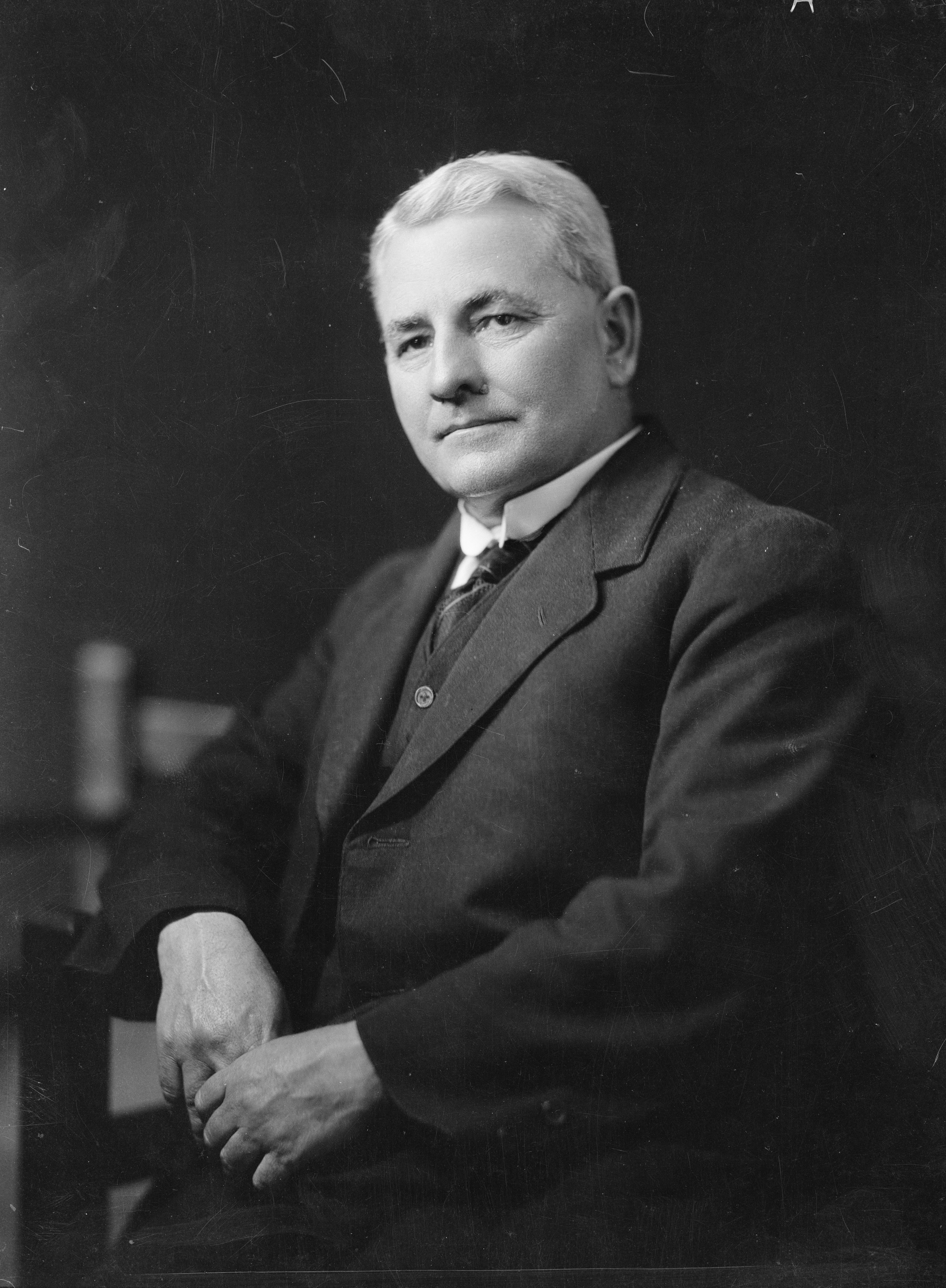

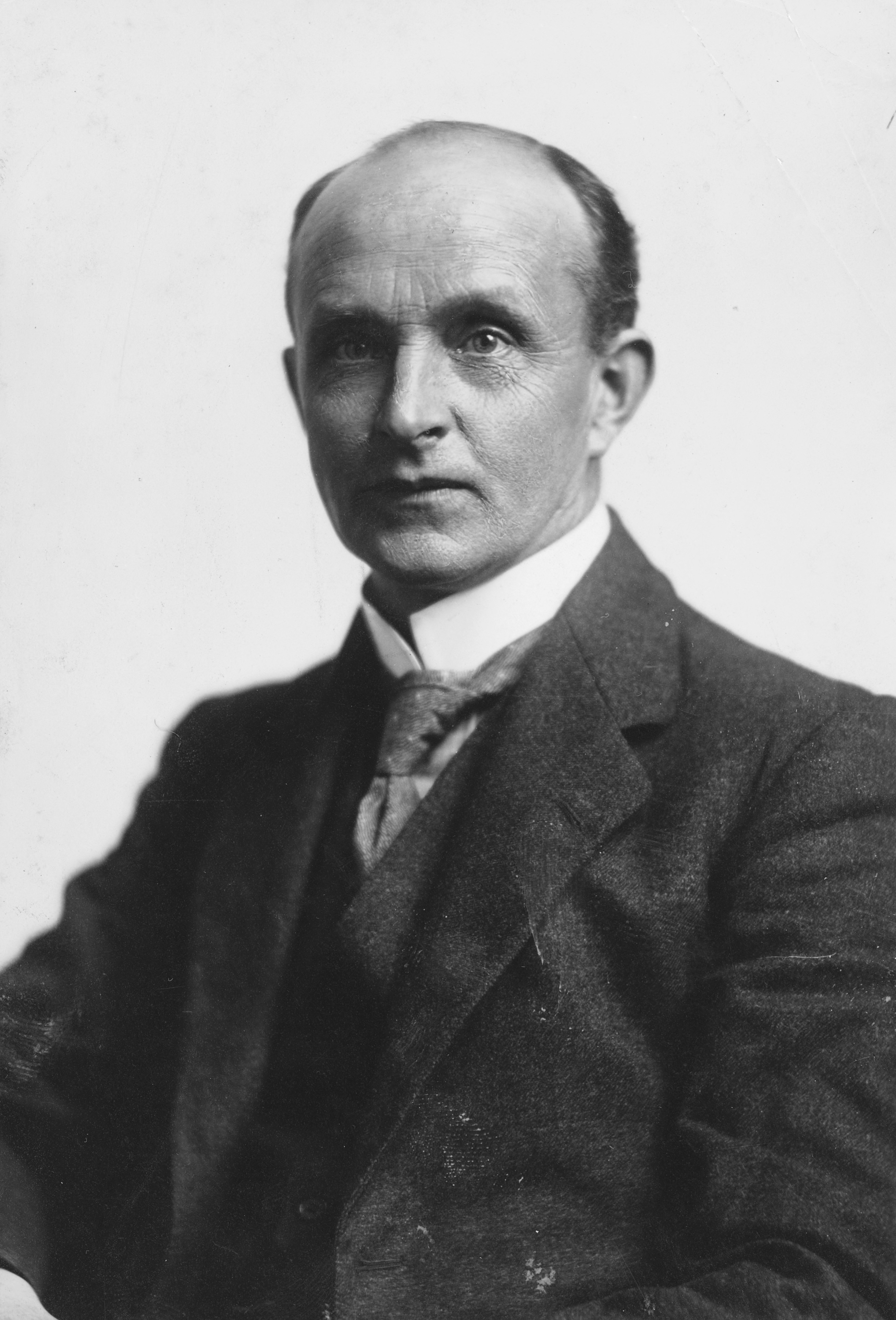
Candidate	Harry Holland	James McCombs
Popular vote	5	3
Percentage	62.5%	37.5%
Leader before election
Harry Holland
Leader after election
Harry Holland

The New Zealand Labour Party leadership election, 1920 was held on 24 June 1920 to determine the future leadership of the New Zealand Labour Party. The election was won by Buller MP Harry Holland, retaining office.

== Background ==
After the 1919 election, former Labour Party President James McCombs who had narrowly lost the previous leadership election to Harry Holland decided to launch a fresh attempt at the leadership. There was a certain level of underlying personal animosity between the two, both remaining bitter over McCombs' resignation from the Labour Party in 1917 over the liquor question. This is thought to be a contributing factor to McCombs' attempts to dethrone Holland.

== Candidates ==
=== Harry Holland ===
Holland had won Labour's leadership the previous year (also opposed by McCombs) and had led them in to the 1919 election where they gained several seats and captured a quarter of the popular vote, though this only equated to an extra three seats in Parliament.

=== James McCombs ===
McCombs was the leader of the Labour Party's moderate faction and continued his agitation against Holland's leadership which he and others thought to be too autocratic. His main supporters in caucus in his plight were fellow Christchurch MPs Dan Sullivan and Ted Howard.

== Result ==
The election was conducted through a members' ballot by Labour's parliamentary caucus. Holland secured five votes to McCombs' three.

=== Leadership ballot ===
Name	Votes	Percentage
Harry Holland	5	62.5%
James McCombs	3	37.5%

== Aftermath ==
Harry Holland continued to lead the Labour Party, and would until his death in 1933. McCombs and Sullivan continued to agitate against Holland's claim to the leadership for the next few years.
