= 1932 Labour Party leadership election =

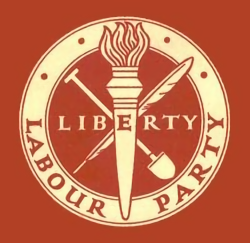
- 25 October 1932
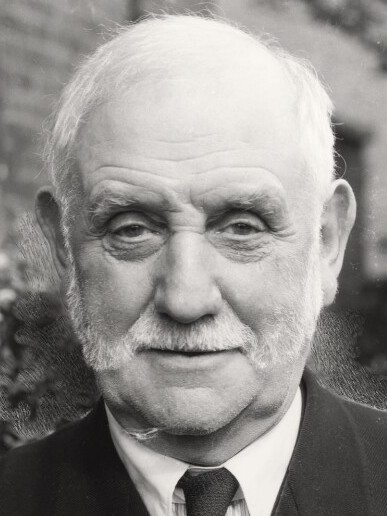
Candidate	George Lansbury
Popular vote	Unopposed
Leader before election
Arthur Henderson
Elected Leader
George Lansbury

The 1932 Labour Party leadership election took place on 25 October 1932, following the resignation of party leader Arthur Henderson.

== Background ==
After the defeat of the Labour Party in the 1931 general election and the defeat in his own constituency of the party leader, Arthur Henderson. Labour was reduced from 287 members to 46 members; George Lansbury was the only senior member of the Labour leadership to retain his seat. As a result, Lansbury became leader of the Parliamentary Labour Party and Leader of the Opposition although Henderson remained party leader despite being outside Parliament. This wasn't without precedent, as Arthur Balfour in 1906 and H. H. Asquith in 1918–20 had both lost their seats in general elections and had remained leader before returning in a by election. However, by October 1932 having not yet attempted a parliamentary return, Henderson (and deputy J. R. Clynes) opted to stand down.

== Candidates ==
=== Declared candidates ===
- George Lansbury, incumbent Leader of the Parliamentary Labour Party, Member of Parliament for Bow and Bromley

=== Potential candidates who declined to run ===
- Clement Attlee, incumbent Deputy Leader of the Parliamentary Labour Party, Member of Parliament for Limehouse
- Arthur Greenwood, former Minister for Health, Member of Parliament for Wakefield

== Results ==
As the only candidate to stand, Lansbury was elected leader unopposed by the Parliamentary Labour Party, with Attlee as his deputy.
