= 1988 Labour Party deputy leadership election =

Election for the Labour Party in the United Kingdom in 1988

- 2 October 1988
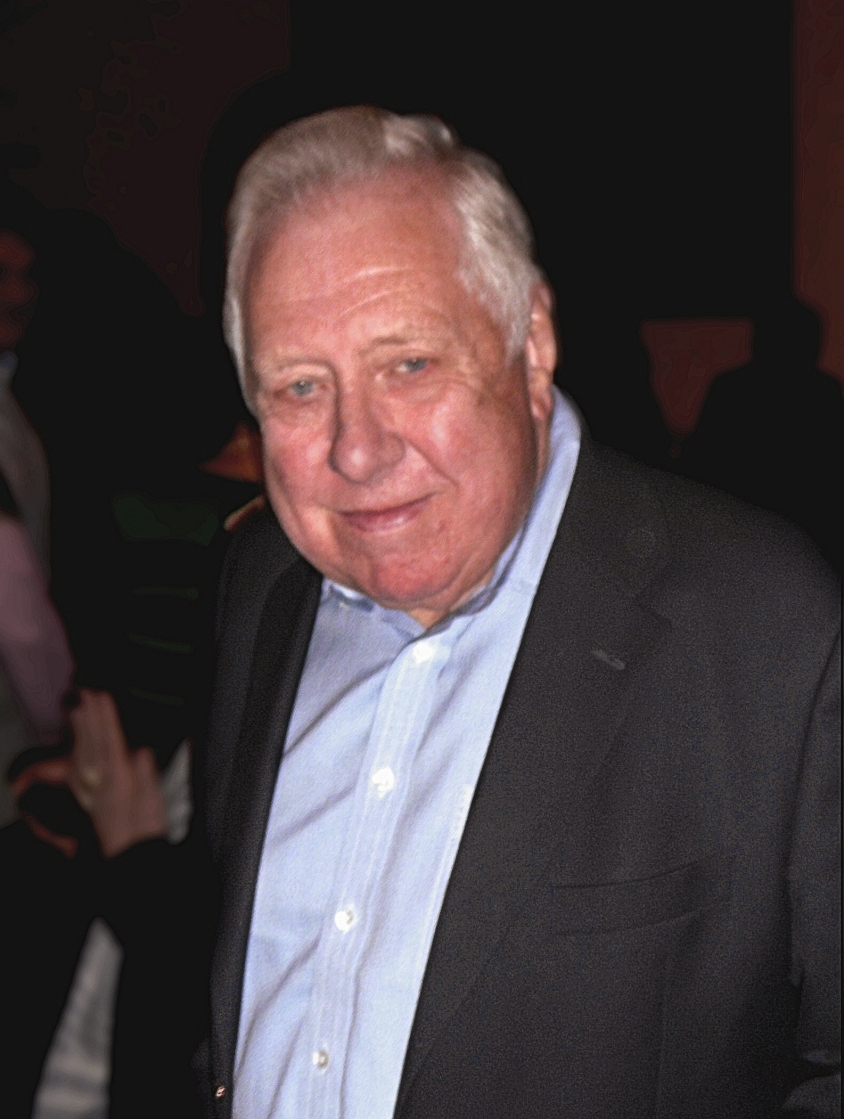

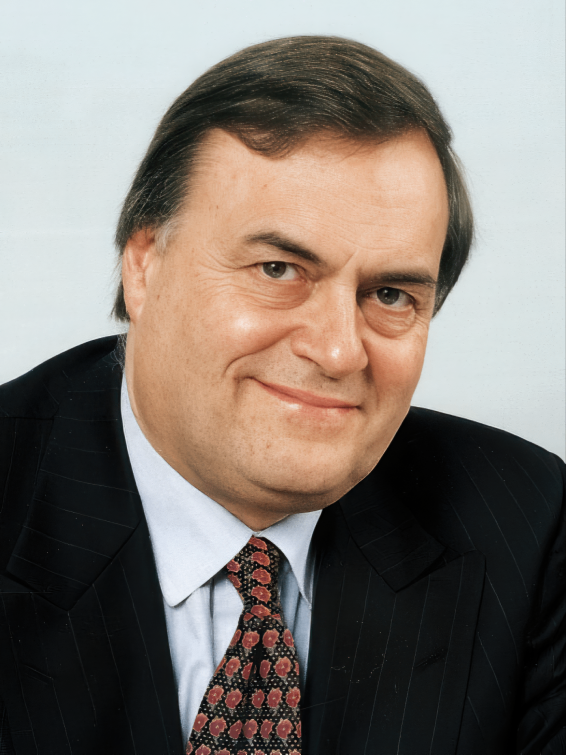

Candidate	Roy Hattersley	John Prescott	Eric Heffer
Overall result	66.8%	23.7%	9.5%
Affiliated unions	78.3%	21.6%	0.0%
Party members	60.4%	26.2%	13.5%
Labour MPs	57.9%	24.0%	18.1%
Deputy Leader before election
Roy Hattersley
Elected Deputy Leader
Roy Hattersley

A deputy leadership election for the Labour Party in the United Kingdom took place on 2 October 1988 when John Prescott and Eric Heffer challenged Labour's incumbent Deputy Leader Roy Hattersley. Hattersley had served in the position since 1983.

The election was conducted using the Labour Party's Electoral College. Delegates at Labour Party conference voted in the election, with 40% of votes going to affiliated unions, 30% to constituency parties and 30% to the Parliamentary Labour Party.

The challenge to Hattersley's position was unsuccessful, and he retained the deputy leadership of the party by a wide margin. He served until 1992, when he resigned following Labour's defeat in the 1992 general election.

== Candidates ==
- Roy Hattersley, incumbent Deputy Leader, Shadow Home Secretary, Member of Parliament for Birmingham Sparkbrook
- Eric Heffer, former Shadow Secretary of State for Housing and Construction, Member of Parliament for Liverpool Walton
- John Prescott, Shadow Secretary of State for Energy, Member of Parliament for Kingston upon Hull East

== Result ==
Candidate	Affiliated block votes (40%)		CLP block votes (30%)		PLP votes (30%)		Overall result
Candidate	Votes	%	Votes	%	Votes	%	%
Roy Hattersley ✓	4,429	78.3	367	60.4	128	57.9	67.3
John Prescott	1,223	21.6	159	26.2	53	24.0	23.7
Eric Heffer	1	0.0	82	13.5	40	18.1	9.4
