= 1983 Labour Party deputy leadership election =

- 2 October 1983
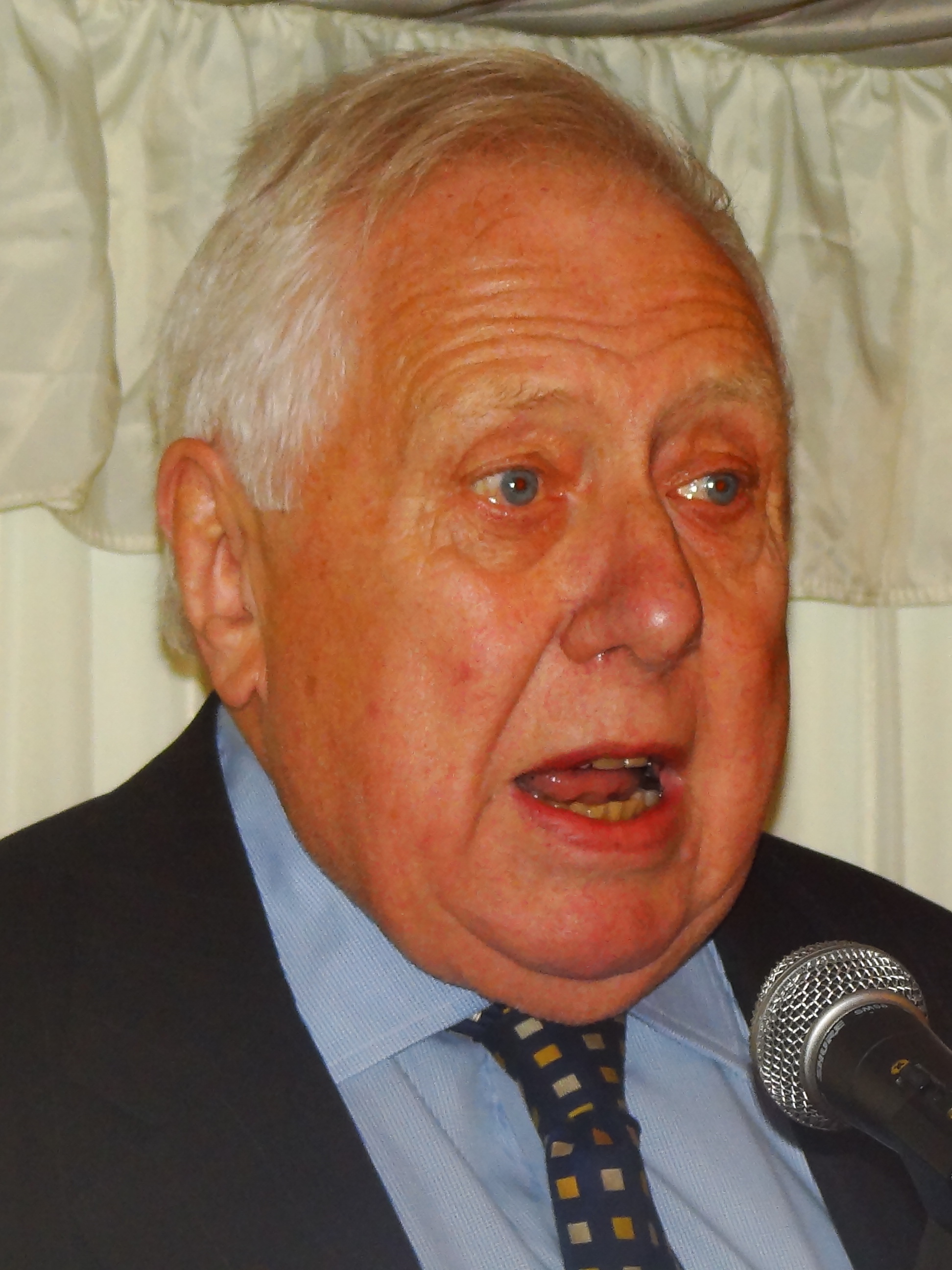

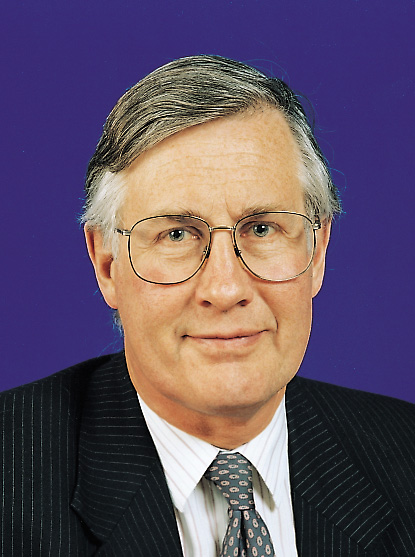

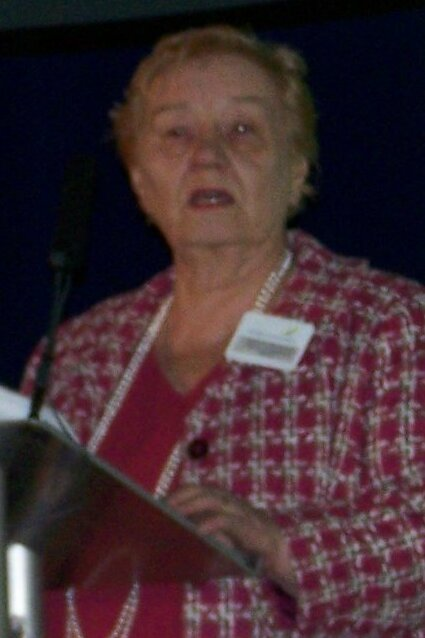
Candidate	Roy Hattersley	Michael Meacher
Overall result	67.3%	27.9%
Affiliated unions	88.2%	11.8%
Party members	51.0%	47.8%
Labour MPs	55.7%	29.4%
Candidate	Denzil Davies	Gwyneth Dunwoody
Overall result	3.5%	1.3%
Affiliated unions	—	—
Party members	0.8%	0.3%
Labour MPs	10.9%	4.0%
Deputy Leader before election
Denis Healey
Elected Deputy Leader
Roy Hattersley

A deputy leadership election for the Labour Party in the United Kingdom took place on 2 October 1983 to replace incumbent Deputy Leader Denis Healey. Healey had served in the position since 1980, becoming deputy leader at the same time that Michael Foot became party leader. Foot and Healey had both announced their resignations following the general election on 9 June 1983, in which a disastrous performance left the Labour Party with just 209 seats in parliament.

The election was conducted using the Labour party's electoral college. It was won by Roy Hattersley, who won more than two-thirds of the votes. On the same day, Neil Kinnock won the leadership election. A young Peter Mandelson was employed in Hattersley's campaign team for the deputy leadership contest.

The election took place at Labour Party conference, with affiliated trade unions holding 40% of the votes, delegates from Constituency Labour Parties holding 30% of the votes, and the Parliamentary Labour Party holding the final 30% of the votes.

== Candidates ==
- Denzil Davies, Shadow Secretary of State for Wales, Member of Parliament for Llanelli
- Gwyneth Dunwoody, Shadow Secretary of State for Health, Member of Parliament for Crewe and Nantwich
- Roy Hattersley, Shadow Home Secretary, Member of Parliament for Birmingham Sparkbrook
- Michael Meacher, former Under-Secretary of State for Trade, Member of Parliament for Oldham West

== Result ==
Candidate	Affiliated block votes (40%)		CLP block votes (30%)		PLP votes (30%)		Overall result
Candidate	Votes	%	Votes	%	Votes	%	%
Roy Hattersley ✓	5,349	88.2	318	51.0	112	55.7	67.3
Michael Meacher	718	11.8	298	47.8	59	29.4	27.9
Denzil Davies	0	0.0	5	0.8	22	10.9	3.5
Gwyneth Dunwoody	0	0.0	2	0.3	8	4.0	1.3

== See also ==
- 1983 Labour Party leadership election (UK)

== Sources ==
- Butler, David & Butler, Gareth (2006). British political facts since 1979 (p. 55). Basingstoke: Palgrave Macmillan. ISBN 978-1-4039-0372-3
- Labour Party Deputy Leadership Elections, 1952–2007
