= 1921 New Zealand Labour Party leadership election =

New Zealand party leadership election

- September 1921
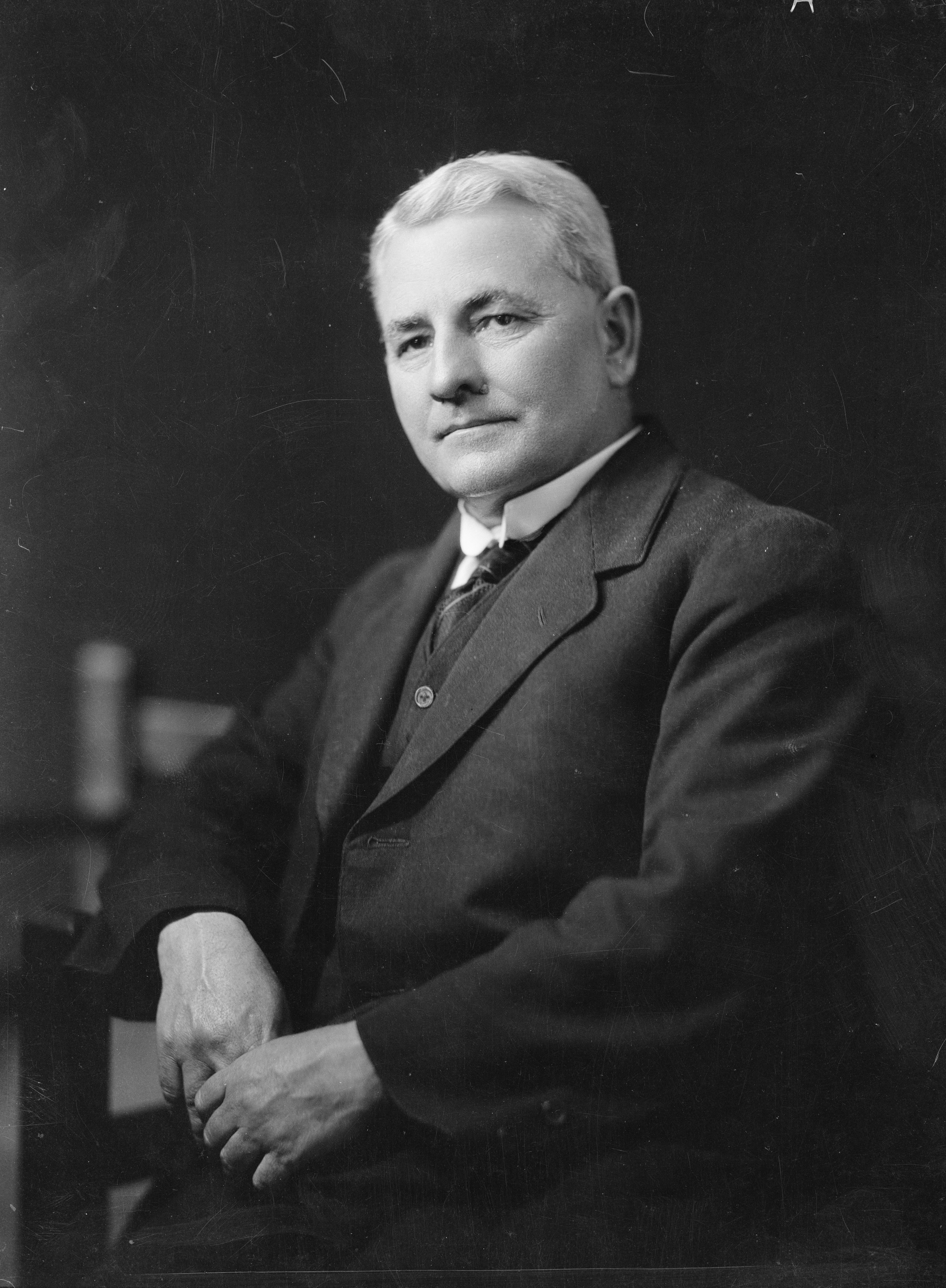

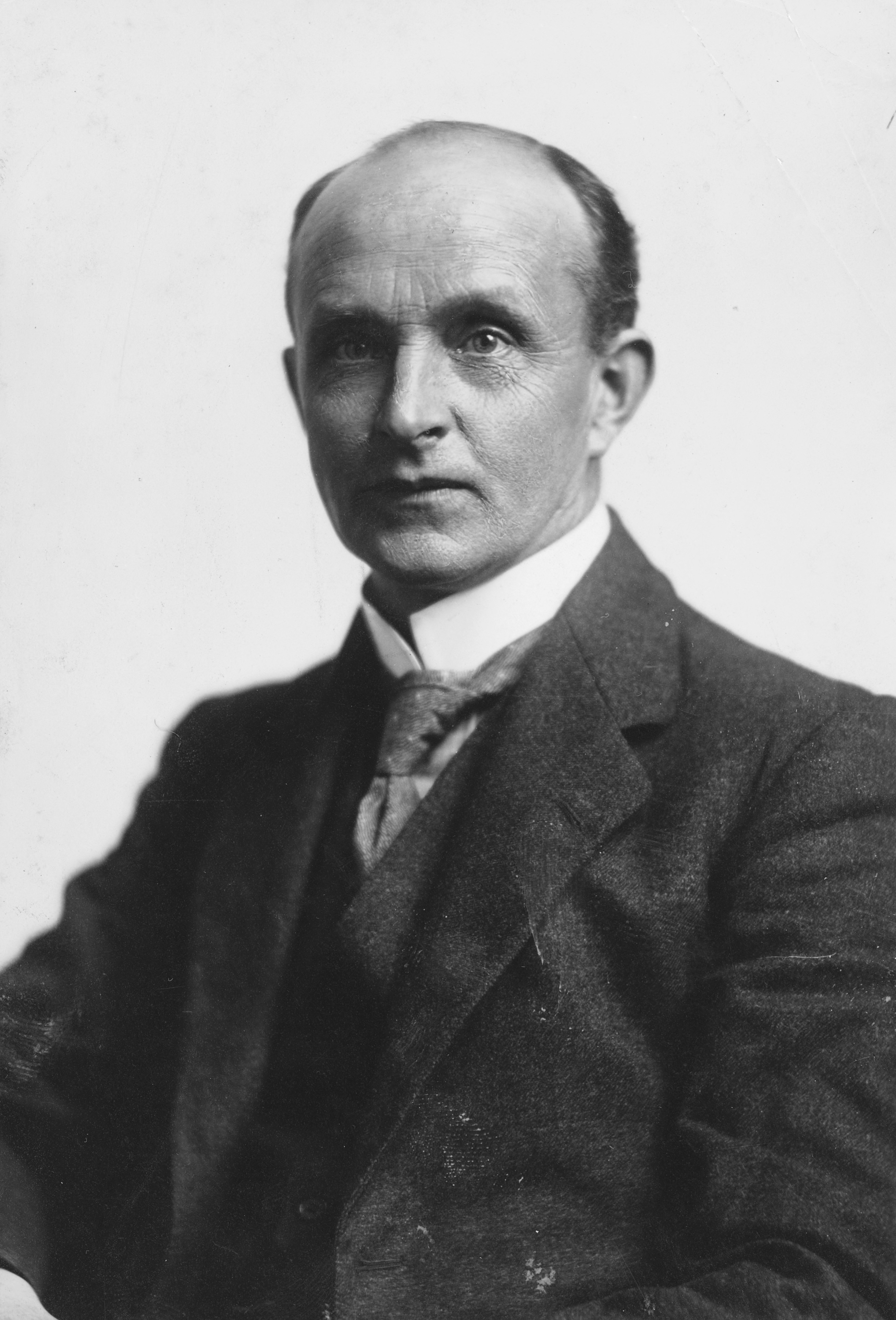
Candidate	Harry Holland	James McCombs
Popular vote	5	2
Percentage	71.42%	28.57%
Leader before election
Harry Holland
Leader after election
Harry Holland

The 1921 New Zealand Labour Party leadership election was held in September 1921 to determine the future leadership of the New Zealand Labour Party. The election was won by Buller MP Harry Holland, retaining office.

== Background ==
Harry Holland had led the Labour Party since 1919. After being elected leader, he led Labour to their first election later that same year gaining 3 seats. He cemented his hold over the party beating off a challenge the year later. The Labour caucus was as divided between moderates and militants as the Labour movement as a whole, which was the backdrop of these internal contests. Holland and his leadership were the subject of much media attention, with newspapers also critical of his leadership style.

== Candidates ==
=== Harry Holland ===
Holland had won Labour's previous leadership contests (opposed by McCombs as well). By Labour standards he was a radical and wrote prolifically on socialist theory. This perceived extremism led many to question whether Labour could gain much traction in future elections. However, the majority of Labour's caucus were also radicals giving Holland the numbers he needed to remain leader.

=== James McCombs ===
McCombs had served in parliament since 1913 and had more parliamentary experience than Holland. He also had been the inaugural president of the Labour Party in 1916. McCombs was the leader of the Labour Party's moderate faction and continued his agitation against Holland's leadership which he and others thought to be too autocratic. His main supporters in caucus in his plight were fellow Christchurch MPs Dan Sullivan and Ted Howard.

== Result ==
The election was conducted through a members ballot by Labour's parliamentary caucus. Holland secured five votes to McCombs' two.

=== Leadership ballot ===
Name	Votes	Percentage
Harry Holland	5	71.42%
James McCombs	2	28.57%

== Aftermath ==
Harry Holland continued to lead the Labour Party, surviving several more challenges, and would until his death in 1933. McCombs and Sullivan continued to agitate against Holland's claim to the leadership for the next few years.
