= 1953 Labour Party deputy leadership election =

British political party election

- 29 October 1953
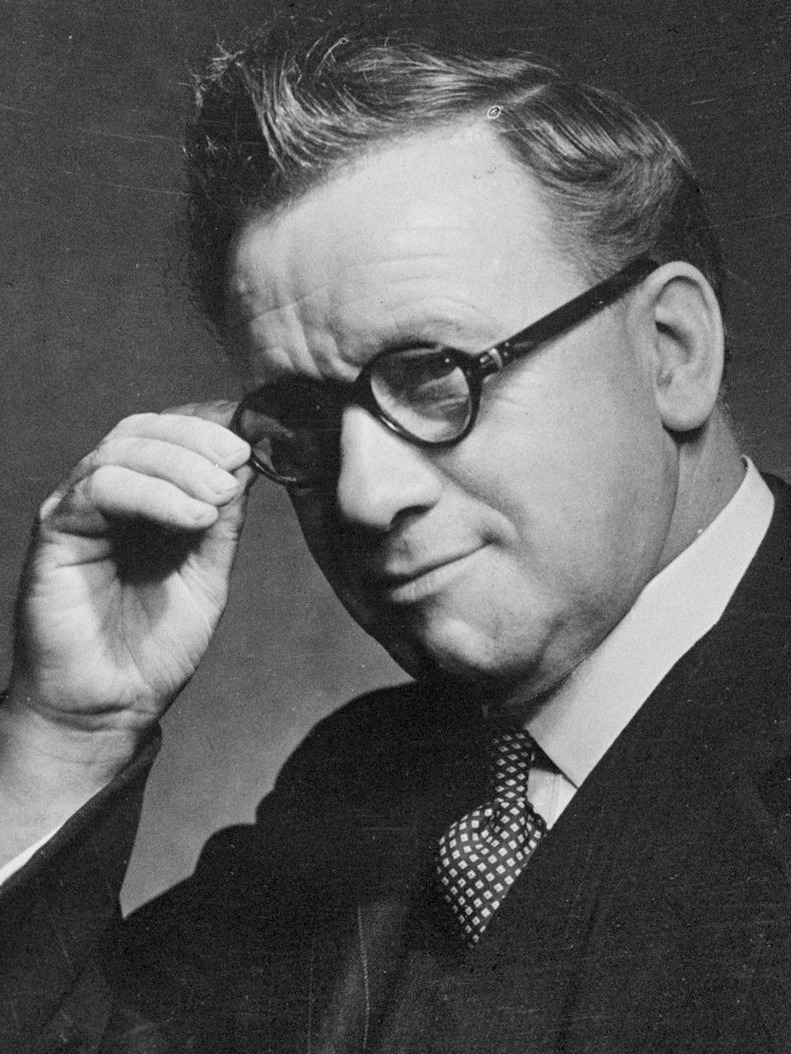

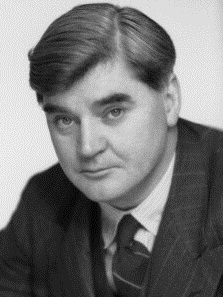
Candidate	Herbert Morrison	Aneurin Bevan
Popular vote	181	76
Percentage	70.4%	29.6%
Deputy Leader before election
Herbert Morrison
Elected Deputy Leader
Herbert Morrison

The 1953 Labour Party deputy leadership election took place on 29 October 1953, after sitting deputy leader Herbert Morrison was challenged by Aneurin Bevan.

== Candidates ==
- Herbert Morrison, incumbent Deputy Leader, Member of Parliament for Lewisham South
- Aneurin Bevan, former Minister of Labour and National Service, Member of Parliament for Ebbw Vale

== Results ==
Only ballot: 29 October 1953
Candidate	Votes	%
Herbert Morrison	181	70.4
Aneurin Bevan	76	29.6
Herbert Morrison re-elected

== Sources ==
- http://privatewww.essex.ac.uk/~tquinn/labour_party_deputy.htm
