= 1919 New Zealand Labour Party leadership election =

New Zealand party leadership election

- 27 August 1919
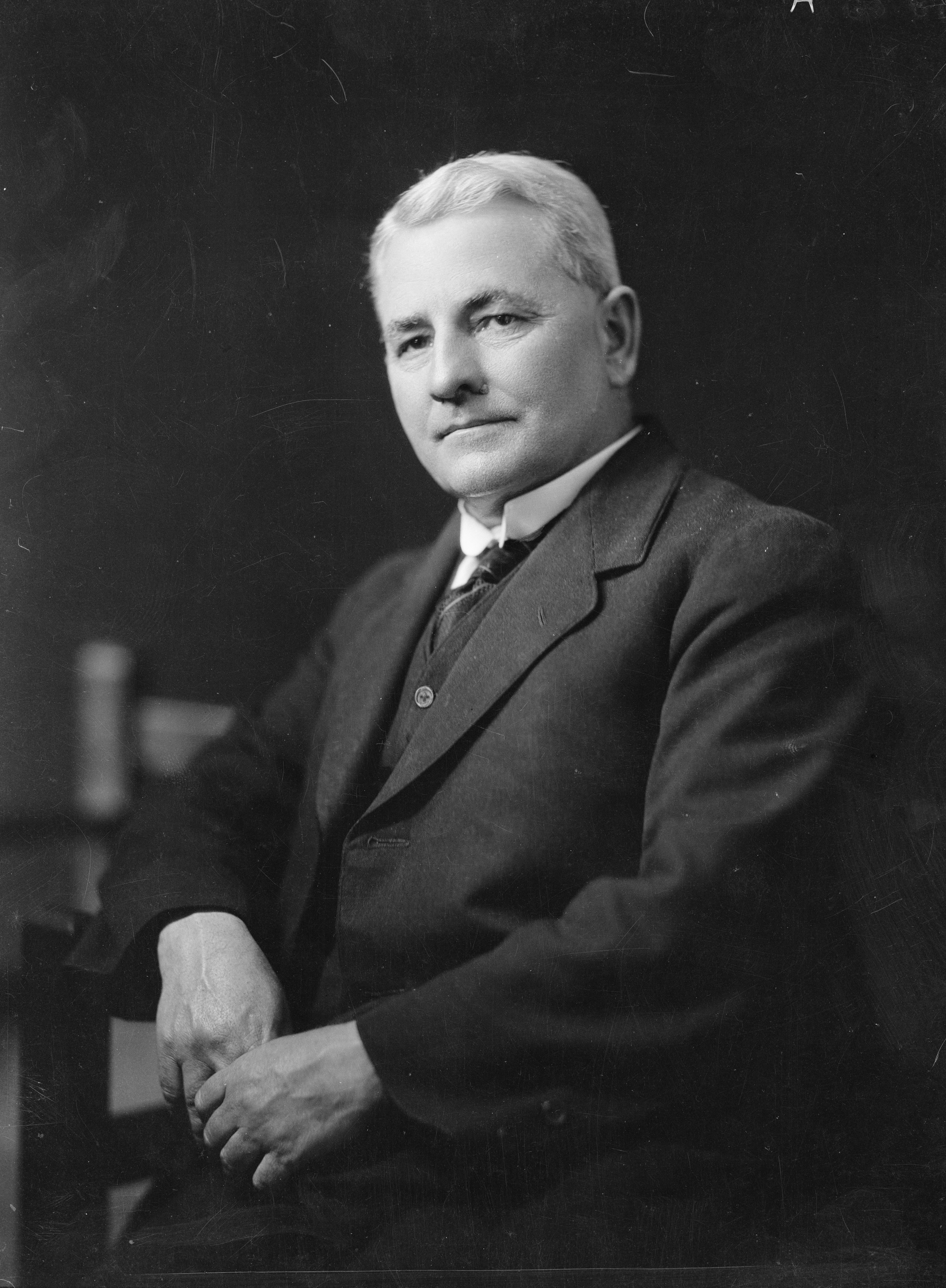

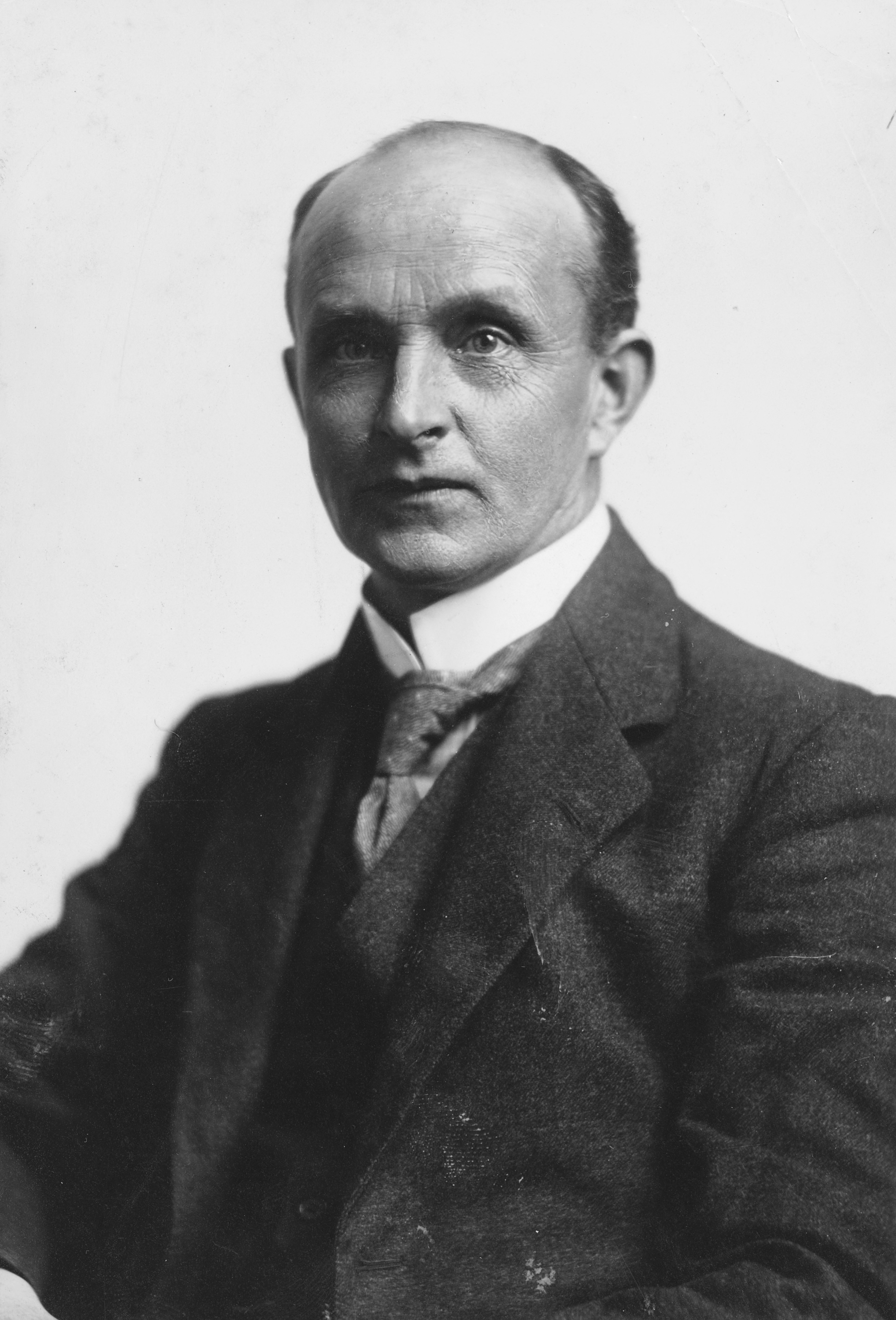
Candidate	Harry Holland	James McCombs
Popular vote	3	3
Percentage	50.0%	50.0%
Leader before election
Alfred Hindmarsh
Leader after election
Harry Holland

The New Zealand Labour Party leadership election, 1919 was held on 27 August 1919 to choose the next leader of the New Zealand Labour Party. The election was won by Grey MP Harry Holland.

It followed the formation of the party and merging of the United Labour Party and Social Democratic Party into one united caucus three years prior.

== Background ==
In 1915 members of the Social Democrats and the United Labour remnant agreed to form a united caucus to better combat the Reform and Liberal party's. Former United Labour MP Alfred Hindmarsh had acted the new Labour Party's chairman and was tasked with unifying the two groups. When the ULP and SDP formally merged into the modern Labour Party, Hindmarsh was chosen to remain the Parliamentary leader. Hindmarsh died in late 1918 in the influenza epidemic leaving the position vacant.

== Candidates ==
=== Harry Holland ===
Holland was acknowledged with having a great amount of political courage, a quality his supporters emphasized would be essential for a fledgling party. Holland was associated with the more radical front of Labour holding strong socialist beliefs, he was backed by members such as Peter Fraser, Michael Joseph Savage, Bob Semple and John A. Lee.

=== James McCombs ===
McCombs had been elected the Labour Party's first president in 1916 until resigning in the following year over the liquor question. He had more parliamentary experience than Holland, serving as an MP since 1913. He was also seen as having a better knowledge of the country than Holland, having lived in New Zealand, far longer. He was the leader of the Labour movement's more moderate wing.

== Result ==
The election was conducted through a members ballot by the then parliamentary caucus. After the votes were counted both candidates won the same number of votes. To break the deadlock drawing by lot was held upon where Holland was eventually successful. The probable votes cast specifically being Peter Fraser and Bob Semple for Holland with Tom Paul and Andrew Walker for McCombs.

== Aftermath ==
Harry Holland led Labour until his death in 1933. Historians have often seen his victory as being due more to his public profile opposed to his policies. He was at the helm for the next five elections, contested unsuccessfully. He also served two spells as the leader of the opposition, the first Labour member to do so. McCombs remained an MP until his own death, also in 1933, leading the more moderate opposing wing to Holland in the caucus alongside Dan Sullivan.
