= Constituency Labour Party =

Organisational unit of the Labour Party (UK)

A constituency Labour Party (CLP) is an organisation of members of the British Labour Party who live in a particular parliamentary constituency.

In England and Wales, CLP boundaries coincide with those for UK parliamentary constituencies. In Scotland, CLP boundaries align with constituencies of the Scottish Parliament. The Labour Party in Northern Ireland has, since February 2009, been organised as a province-wide constituency Labour Party which is yet to contest elections. Labour International is a CLP for members of the British Labour Party who are currently living overseas.

For much of the Labour Party's history, especially during the 1980s, CLPs were perceived as relatively left wing, compared to the more moderate or pragmatic trade unions.

== Bodies ==
A CLP's main decision-making body is normally its General Committee (GC) or All Member Meeting (AMM). Day-to-day management is generally carried out by the executive committee (EC).

The AMM method of organisation was introduced as an option in 1997. Prior to that Branch Labour Parties (BLP) would elect delegates to the CLP General Committee. Until the 1970s there were generally also ward groups that elected delegates to their BLP. Until the 1970s membership dues were collected by branches or the CLP, usually monthly by visiting every member so members had regular physical contact with the party. This also meant CLPs retained a large part of the membership fee, but after membership was computerised and collected nationally a smaller part of the fee was given to CLPs.

Party unit	Description
General Committee (GC)	The GC is made up of delegates elected from the branch Labour Parties (BLP), local branches of affiliated trade unions, socialist societies, the local branch of the Co-operative Party, BLP secretaries and CLP officers. Other CLP members may usually attend but not vote. The GC may sometimes be referred to as the General Management Committee (GMC). In many CLPs, the GC has now been replaced by the All Member Meeting (AMM), where all members in the CLP may attend and vote
Executive Committee (EC)	Manages the CLP. Appointed by and reports to the GC. The EC is generally constituted in the same manner but with fewer delegates from each branch and affiliate. Consists of a Chair, Secretary, two Vice Chairs (One for policy and one for membership, one of whom must be a woman), Women's officer and Treasurer
Branch Labour parties (BLP)	The BLP is the basic local geographic unit for the Labour Party, and is where local party members gather at the most local level. Local BLPs usually have boundaries which follow local government boundaries, commonly wards. The membership of branches is drawn from members of the party who reside or are registered to vote within the area covered by the branch
Young Labour Group	May be established to co-ordinate work among young members. May be established covering any number of neighbouring CLPs
LGBT Group	May be established to co-ordinate work among members of the LGBT+ community
Ethnic Minorities Forum	May be established to co-ordinate work among black, Asian, minority ethnic (BAME) members
Disability Officers/Equality Officers	May be established to co-ordinate and work alongside Disabled members. May also work alongside Disability Labour, the Labour Party's affiliated Disability organisation. The may also be a job share role but with only one vote
Campaign Committee	Co-ordinates public activity of the CLP
Women's Forum	May be established to co-ordinate work among women members

== Officers ==
The Labour Party Rule Book establishes the CLP officers as chair, vice-chair/campaigns, vice-chair/membership, secretary, treasurer and women's officer. These officers are referred to as the Key Officers.

CLPs may appoint additional "functional officers" such as a Youth Officer, BAME Officer, LGBT+ Officer, Disability Officer, Political Education and Training Officer, Trade Union Liaison Officer (TULO), Business Liaison Officer (BuLO), Information Technology Officer and Fundraising Officer who may attend meetings of the executive committee (without voting power).

The CLP elects representatives to national Party structures, including delegates to Labour Party Conference, and it nominates candidates for election to other Party positions such as the National Policy Forum and the National Executive Committee, as well as Party structures within Scotland, Wales or the appropriate English region.

== Meetings ==
In 2004, the Labour Party carried out the "21st Century Party" review. As a result, some CLPs chose to change their arrangements. Some CLPs have merged the GC and EC into a single committee, whilst some CLPs have abolished the GC entirely and organize all-member meetings to take decisions. Other CLPs, particularly in urban areas divided between a number of constituencies, have chosen to combine their activities with neighbouring CLPs.

CLP committees generally meet on a monthly basis: some have chosen to meet less frequently and to organise all-member meetings or policy forums in intervening months. Changes to the standard model of operation for CLPs require permission from the Party's National Executive Committee: however, this practice can be devolved to National or Regional (paid) Officers of the Party.

== Local campaign forums ==
CLPs also elect representative to local campaign forums (LCFs) which promote the election of Labour councillors and then oversee the work of Labour councillors on a specific principal local authority. LCFs replaced local government committees in Autumn 2011 as part of the Labour Party's Refounding Labour agenda. Where the boundaries of a local authority are the same as those used for a parliamentary constituency, the GC will also assume the role of LCF.

The LCF may be referred to in some areas by the older title of district Labour party (DLP) where it is overseeing a district council and county Labour party where it is overseeing the work of a shire county council.

== Selection of parliamentary candidates ==
Functions of the CLP include selecting the local Labour Party candidate for a national parliamentary General Election.

Where there is a sitting Labour MP, the CLP can organise a 'trigger ballot' to decide whether it wishes to carry out the full selection procedure outlined below or simply endorse the sitting MP as their candidate at the next election. It is unusual for a sitting MP to 'lose' their trigger ballot, which requires the endorsement of one third of party branches or one third of affiliated branches to succeed.

In the event that the MP is not a Labour MP, or the sitting MP is retiring or has lost their trigger ballot, a full selection is held. The CLP must, for this, follow the procedures agreed by the National Executive Committee, including whether or not the selection will be carried out from an open or all-women shortlist.

The CLP can choose whether or not to select a candidate on the Labour Party's panel of approved candidates. However, should the CLP select a candidate not on the panel, its decision is subject to the National Executive Committee retrospectively satisfying itself that the candidate reaches the standard required to join the panel. In this and other circumstances (for example new information emerging about a candidate subsequent to their selection), the National Executive Committee can exercise its power to block a CLP's initial choice, which has on occasion proved controversial. In May 2022, all members of the executive committee of the Wakefield CLP resigned after their chosen candidates were all denied approval.

== See also ==
- Conservative Association
