= Parliamentary Labour Party =

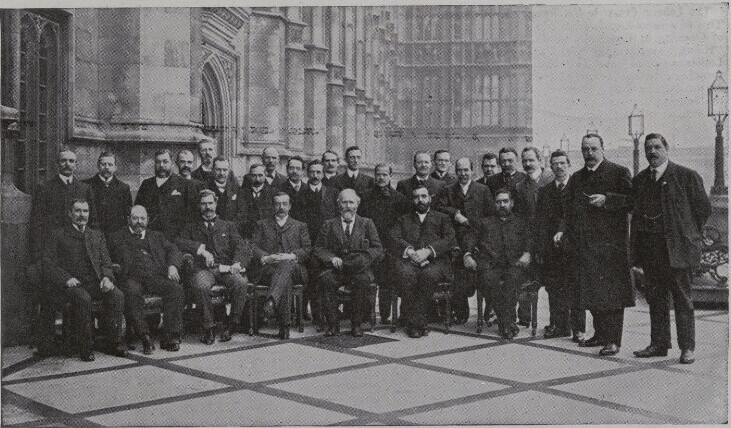
The Parliamentary Labour Party in 1906

The Parliamentary Labour Party (PLP) is the parliamentary group of the Labour Party in the British House of Commons. The group comprises the Labour members of parliament as a collective body. Commentators on the British Constitution sometimes draw a distinction between the Labour Party (which was created outside Parliament and later achieved office) and the Conservative and Liberal parties (which began as parliamentary factions). The term Parliamentary Labour Party refers to the party in Parliament, whereas the term Labour Party refers to the entire Labour Party, the parliamentary element of which is the PLP.

An organisation for former members, the PLP in exile, was established following the 2010 general election.

== Role ==
The PLP holds regular meetings behind closed doors to question the Leader and to discuss its concerns.

Labour MPs elect three of their number to Labour's National Executive Committee.

Originally, the Leader of the Labour Party was elected by the PLP. Now, however, the party operates on a one member, one vote system, where all members are awarded a single vote, as well as affiliated organizations (trade unions and socialist societies) and temporary registered supporters. Instant-runoff voting (the "Alternative Vote") is used to conduct the election. Labour MPs retain the power to trigger an extraordinary or "special" Labour Party Conference to choose a new leader if they lose confidence in their existing leader.

== Chair ==
The Chair of the PLP chairs meetings of the Parliamentary party. They are elected by Labour MPs at the start of each annual session of Parliament. By tradition, only elections at the start of each Parliament, following a general election, are competitive.

From 1921 to 1970, the Chair of the PLP was also the leader of the party as a whole; before 1921, leadership of the party was arguably split between the Chairman of the PLP, the General Secretary and the Party Chairman. When the leaders of the Labour Party joined coalition governments during the First and Second World Wars, an acting chair was appointed to lead the rump of the party in Opposition. When the Party was in government, a liaison committee was elected to facilitate communications between the cabinet and Labour backbenchers – the chair of this committee also chaired meetings of the PLP as a whole during these periods. In 1970, the positions of Leader of the Labour Party and Chair of the PLP were permanently split.

Leader	Tenure	Liaison Committee	Tenure	Opposition	Tenure
Keir Hardie	1906–1908				
Arthur Henderson	1908–1910				
George Barnes	1910–1911				
Ramsay MacDonald	1911–1914				
Arthur Henderson	1914–1917			John Hodge	1915–16
Arthur Henderson	1914–1917			George Wardle	1916–17
William Adamson	1917–1921				
J. R. Clynes	1921–1922				
Ramsay MacDonald	1922–1931	Robert Smillie	1924		
Ramsay MacDonald	1922–1931	Harry Snell	1929–30		
Ramsay MacDonald	1922–1931	James Barr	1930–31		
Arthur Henderson	1931				
George Lansbury	1931–1935				
Clement Attlee	1935–1955	Neil Maclean	1945–46	Hastings Lees-Smith	1940–1941
Clement Attlee	1935–1955	Maurice Webb	1946–1950	Frederick Pethick-Lawrence	1942
Clement Attlee	1935–1955	Glenvil Hall	1950–51	Arthur Greenwood	1942–1945
Hugh Gaitskell	1955–1963				
Harold Wilson	1963–1970	Manny Shinwell	1964–1967		
Harold Wilson	1963–1970	Douglas Houghton	1967–1970		
Chairman	Tenure				
Douglas Houghton	1970–1974				
Ian Mikardo	1974				
Cledwyn Hughes	1974–1979				
Fred Willey	1979–1981				
Jack Dormand	1981–1987				
Stan Orme	1987–1992				
Doug Hoyle	1992–1997				
Clive Soley	1997–2001				
Jean Corston	2001–2005				
Ann Clwyd	2005–2006				
Tony Lloyd	2006–2012				
David Watts	2012–2015				
John Cryer	2015–2024				
Jessica Morden	2024–present				

== Other roles and groups ==
There is also a deputy chair.

Other groups have been established within the PLP, such as the Women's PLP and the LGBT+ PLP.

Labour and Co-operative MPs form part of the PLP, though they also meet (together with Labour Co-op members of the House of Lords) as the Co-operative Parliamentary Group, which has its own chair.

== See also ==
- 1922 Committee
- Parliamentary group
