= 2008 Labour Party leadership election =

Leadership elections took place in Labour Parties in the following countries during 2008:

- 2008 New Zealand Labour Party leadership election
- 2008 Scottish Labour leadership election
  - 2008 Scottish Labour deputy leadership election

== See also ==
- 2007 Labour Party leadership election (disambiguation)
- 2009 Labour Party leadership election
