= Pat McFadden =

British politician (born 1965)

The Right Honourable Pat McFadden MP
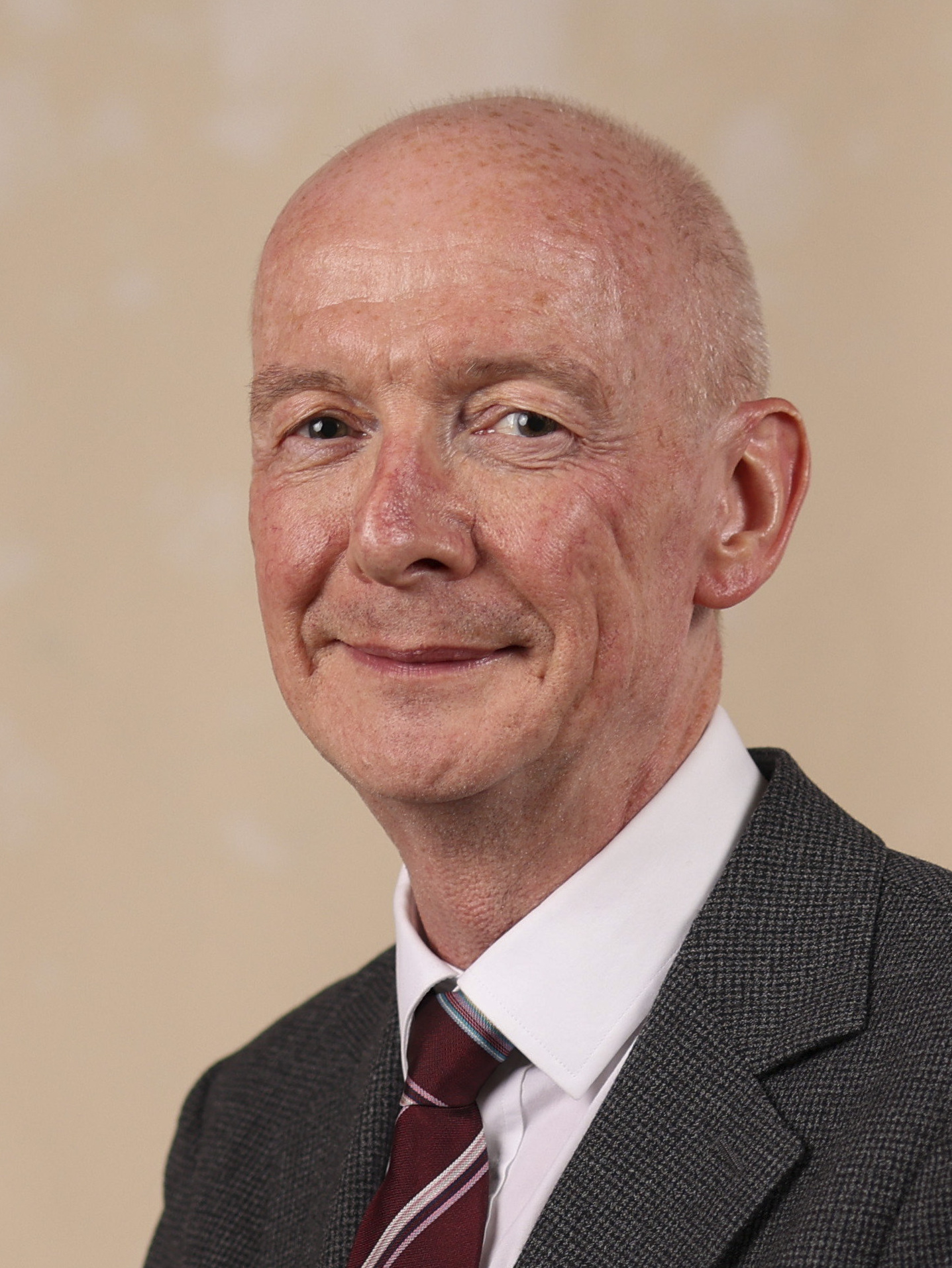
- Official portrait, 2024

Secretary of State for Work and Pensions
- Incumbent
- Assumed office 5 September 2025
- Prime Minister: Keir Starmer; Andy Burnham
- Preceded by: Liz Kendall

Chancellor of the Duchy of Lancaster
- In office 5 July 2024 – 5 September 2025
- Prime Minister: Keir Starmer
- Preceded by: Oliver Dowden
- Succeeded by: Darren Jones

Minister for Intergovernmental Relations
- In office 5 July 2024 – 6 September 2025
- Prime Minister: Keir Starmer
- Preceded by: Michael Gove
- Succeeded by: Darren Jones
Ministerial offices 2006–2010
Minister of State for Business, Innovation and Skills
In office 9 June 2009 – 11 May 2010
| Prime Minister | Gordon Brown |
| Preceded by | The Baroness Vadera |
| Succeeded by | Mark Prisk |
Minister of State for Employment Relations
In office 28 June 2007 – 5 June 2009
| Prime Minister | Gordon Brown |
| Preceded by | Jim Fitzpatrick |
| Succeeded by | The Lord Young |
Parliamentary Secretary for the Cabinet Office
In office 5 May 2006 – 28 June 2007
| Prime Minister | Tony Blair |
| Preceded by | Jim Murphy |
| Succeeded by | Gillian Merron |
Shadow portfolios 2010–2024
Shadow Cabinet portfolios
| 2023–2024 | Chancellor of the Duchy of Lancaster |
| 2023–2024 | Labour Party National Campaign Coordinator |
| 2021–2023 | Chief Secretary to the Treasury |
| May 2010– October 2010 | Business, Innovation and Skills |
Junior Shadow portfolios
| 2020–2021 | Economic Secretary to the Treasury |
| 2014–2016 | Minister for Europe |

Member of Parliament for Wolverhampton South East
- Incumbent
- Assumed office 5 May 2005
- Preceded by: Dennis Turner
- Majority: 9,188 (27.5%)

Political Secretary to the Prime Minister of the United Kingdom
- In office 2002–2005
- Prime Minister: Tony Blair
- Preceded by: Robert Hill
- Succeeded by: John McTernan

Personal details
- Born: Patrick Bosco McFadden; 26 March 1965 (age 61) Paisley, Renfrewshire, Scotland
- Party: Labour
- Spouse: Marianna McFadden
- Children: 2
- Education: University of Edinburgh (MA)
- Website: Official website

Patrick Bosco McFadden (born 26 March 1965) is a British politician who has served as Secretary of State for Work and Pensions since 2025, having previously served as Chancellor of the Duchy of Lancaster from 2024 to 2025. A member of the Labour Party, he has been the Member of Parliament (MP) for Wolverhampton South East since 2005.

Born in Paisley, McFadden was educated at Holyrood Secondary School. He studied politics at the University of Edinburgh and was chair of Scottish Labour Students from 1986 to 1987. After leaving university, he worked for Labour Scottish affairs spokesman Donald Dewar and Labour leader John Smith. He then worked for Tony Blair, serving as Political Secretary to the Prime Minister from 2002 to 2005. McFadden was elected to Parliament as MP for Wolverhampton South East at the 2005 general election. He joined the government frontbench as Parliamentary Secretary for the Cabinet Office in 2006 before being promoted to Minister of State for Employment Relations and Postal Affairs under Gordon Brown. In 2009, he was promoted to a cabinet-attending role as Minister of State for Business, Innovation and Skills, deputy to Business Secretary Peter Mandelson.

After Labour's defeat in the 2010 general election, McFadden was shadow business secretary in the interm shadow cabinet of Harriet Harman from May to October 2010. He unsuccessfully sought election to the shadow cabinet and then subsequently returned to the backbenches. McFadden rejoined the frontbench as shadow europe minister under Ed Miliband in 2014 and was reappointed by Jeremy Corbyn in 2015. McFadden was dismissed by Corbyn in 2016, and remained on the backbenches until he was appointed Shadow Economic Secretary to the Treasury in 2020 by Keir Starmer. He was promoted to the shadow cabinet in 2021 as Shadow Chief Secretary to the Treasury and became Shadow Chancellor of the Duchy of Lancaster in 2023.

McFadden returned to the government following Labour's victory in the 2024 general election, and was appointed Chancellor of the Duchy of Lancaster and Minister for Intergovernmental Relations by Starmer in his ministry. While serving in the Cabinet Office, he undertook several civil service and public sector reforms, including abolishing ACOBA and establishing the Ethics and Integrity Commission. In the 2025 cabinet reshuffle, McFadden was appointed Secretary of State for Work and Pensions. During his tenure under Starmer, he oversaw the scrapping of the two-child benefit cap, and enacted welfare reform to reduce public spending and increase employment. McFadden nominated Andy Burnham in the 2026 leadership election and was subsequently reappointed to the position in the Burnham ministry.

== Early life and education ==
Patrick McFadden was born on 26 March 1965 in Paisley. He is the son of James McFadden and Annie McFadden (née Gallagher), both native Irish speakers from just outside Falcarragh, a village in County Donegal in Ulster, the northern province in Ireland. As a child, Pat McFadden regularly visited County Donegal.

McFadden was educated at Holy Cross RC Primary School on Calder Street and Holyrood Secondary School in Crosshill, south-east Glasgow. He later attended the University of Edinburgh from 1983 to 1987, earning an MA degree in politics.

He was chair of Scottish Labour Students in 1986–87.

== Early career ==
In 1988 he became a researcher for Donald Dewar, then Labour's Scottish Affairs spokesman.

In 1993, he left this role to become a speechwriter and policy adviser to the Labour leader John Smith.

Prior to becoming an MP, he worked in several advisory roles for Tony Blair, both in opposition and government, and was the Prime Minister's Political Secretary from 2002.

== Parliamentary career ==
=== Early career and ministerial roles (2005–2010) ===
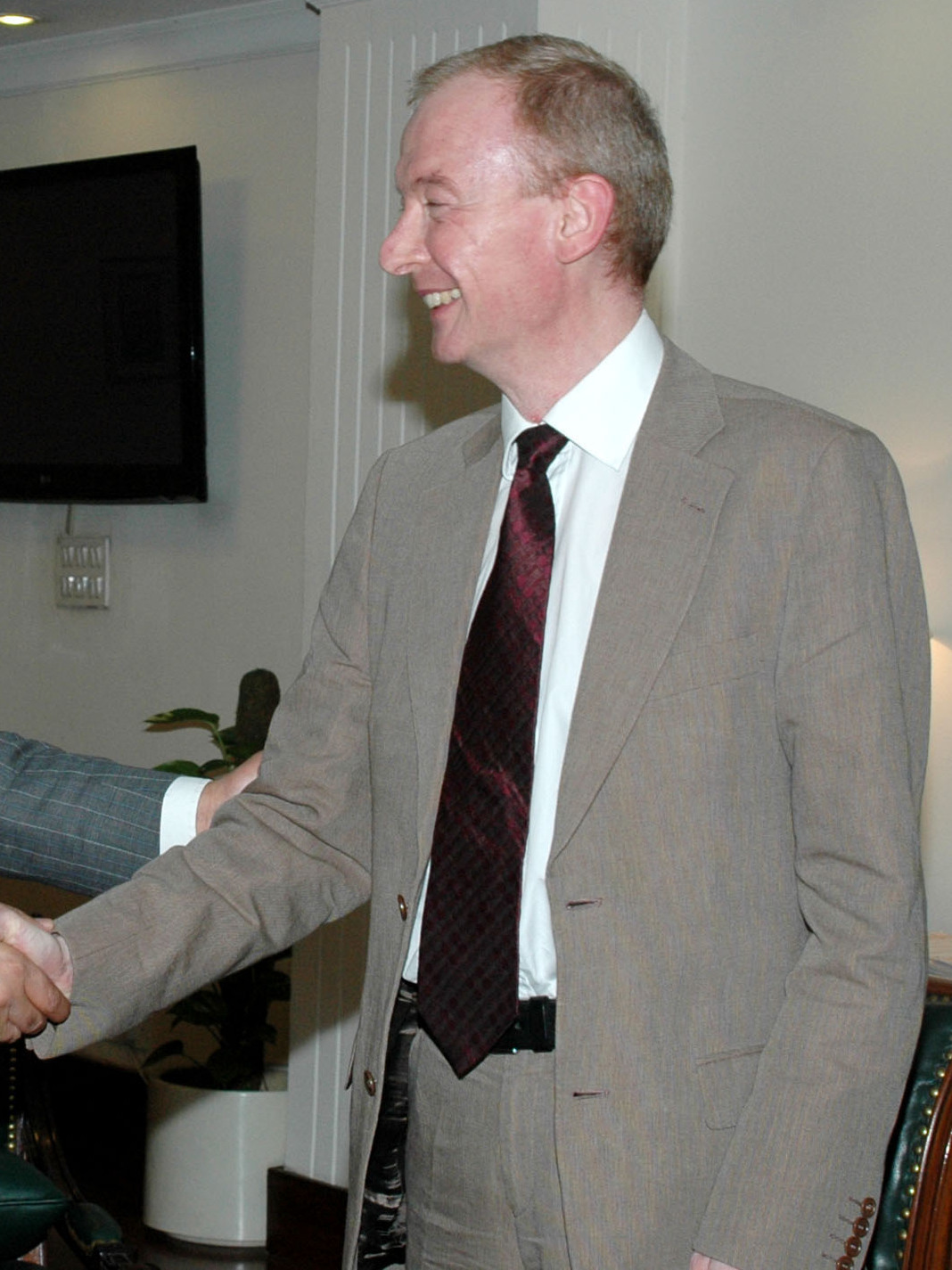
McFadden in 2010

McFadden was elected as MP for Wolverhampton South East at the 2005 general election with 59.4% of the vote and a majority of 10,495.

In the 2006 reshuffle he was appointed as Parliamentary Secretary for the Cabinet Office. In the 2007 reshuffle he was promoted to Minister of State in the then newly created Department for Business, Enterprise and Regulatory Reform with responsibility for Employment Relations and Postal Affairs.

In October 2008, when Peter Mandelson replaced John Hutton as Business Secretary, McFadden took on duties as his deputy in order to represent the department in the House of Commons as Mandelson was a peer and could only address the Lords. McFadden was contemporaneously appointed to the Privy Council.

==== Allegations over expenses ====
In the 2009 United Kingdom parliamentary expenses scandal, it had emerged that McFadden had claimed £5,581 in legal fees, stamp duty, and solicitors fees relating to the purchase of a second home in his Wolverhampton constituency. McFadden originally rented a home in the constituency, but after that one was sold, he wanted to have a permanent home in the constituency. This meant that the monthly cost increased from £500 in rent to £663 in monthly mortgage payments. McFadden also claimed another £969.47 on lights, curtains and blinds and £71 on bins. He also claimed another £356 for four dining room chairs, which was queried by the fees office. In response, McFadden stated that he had checked with the fees office whether the furniture bills were within the guidelines before claiming them, and said that any furniture bought for his second home were one-off costs.

=== In opposition ===
==== Early years (2010–2014) ====
At the 2010 general election, McFadden was re-elected as MP for Wolverhampton South East with a decreased vote share of 47.7% and a decreased majority of 6,593. After Labour's defeat in the general election and the resignation of Gordon Brown, McFadden was named in interim leader Harriet Harman's shadow cabinet as Shadow Business Secretary. In the role, McFadden advocated for Labour to accept and confront the deficit, and warned that if it did not do so, then the party would risk losing support. In a speech to the Fabian society, he stated that "as the pain of the government's cuts bites, public opposition to them will grow, but people will still want to know what we would do differently – and they won't believe us if our answer is just that we could make it all go away."

McFadden supported David Miliband in the 2010 Labour leadership election. When Ed Miliband was elected as Labour leader in September 2010, McFadden announced his decision to stand in Labour's shadow cabinet election but was not elected.

From November 2011 to November 2014, McFadden served on the Treasury Select Committee. He also served as Parliamentary Commission on Banking Standards (Joint Committee) from July 2012 to June 2013.

==== Miliband frontbench (2014–2015) ====
In the 2014 Shadow Cabinet reshuffle, Miliband appointed McFadden as shadow minister for Europe. In the position, he opposed Brexit, but argued that Labour agreed there was a need for change in Europe. He stated that he wanted to make a "hard-headed, patriotic case for both Britain in Europe and for change in Europe so that it works for working people."

In October 2014, after the UK was told to pay an extra £1.7 billion to the European Union budget, McFadden called on Prime Minister David Cameron to work with allies in Europe to put pressure on the European Commissioner to reconsider the proposed change.

McFadden was again re-elected at the 2015 general election, with an increased vote share of 53.3% and an increased majority of 10,767. Following the defeat of the Labour Party in the election and the resignation of Miliband, McFadden nominated Liz Kendall in the subsequent Labour Party leadership election.

==== Corbyn frontbench (2015–2016) ====
McFadden retained his post as Shadow Europe Minister when Jeremy Corbyn became Labour leader.

McFadden came under scrutiny after The Times reported that McFadden had claimed £21,875 in expenses to cover the cost of renting a second home in constituency, while he was letting out the property he owned next door. It was reported that he claimed £7,500 rent in 2014, whilst also owning a home in London valued at £1.2 million. The arrangement was within the rules the Independent Parliamentary Standards Authority (IPSA), but former chairman of the committee on standards in public life, Alistair Graham, described it as "pretty scandalous" and against the spirit of the new expenses system.

McFadden was dismissed from the frontbench along with Michael Dugher in January 2016. He was dismissed for what the leadership described as repeated acts of disloyalty, including when, responding to a Stop the War article on the Paris bombings, he condemned "the view that sees terrorist acts as always being a response or a reaction to what we in the west do". John McDonnell said that McFadden's remarks, expressed in a question to the Prime Minister and interpreted as an attack on Corbyn, were an example of him undermining the leader's view. McFadden was defended by Ian Austin and Chris Leslie. Jonathan Reynolds and Stephen Doughty expressed support for McFadden in their resignation letters the following day.

==== Backbenches (2016–2020) ====
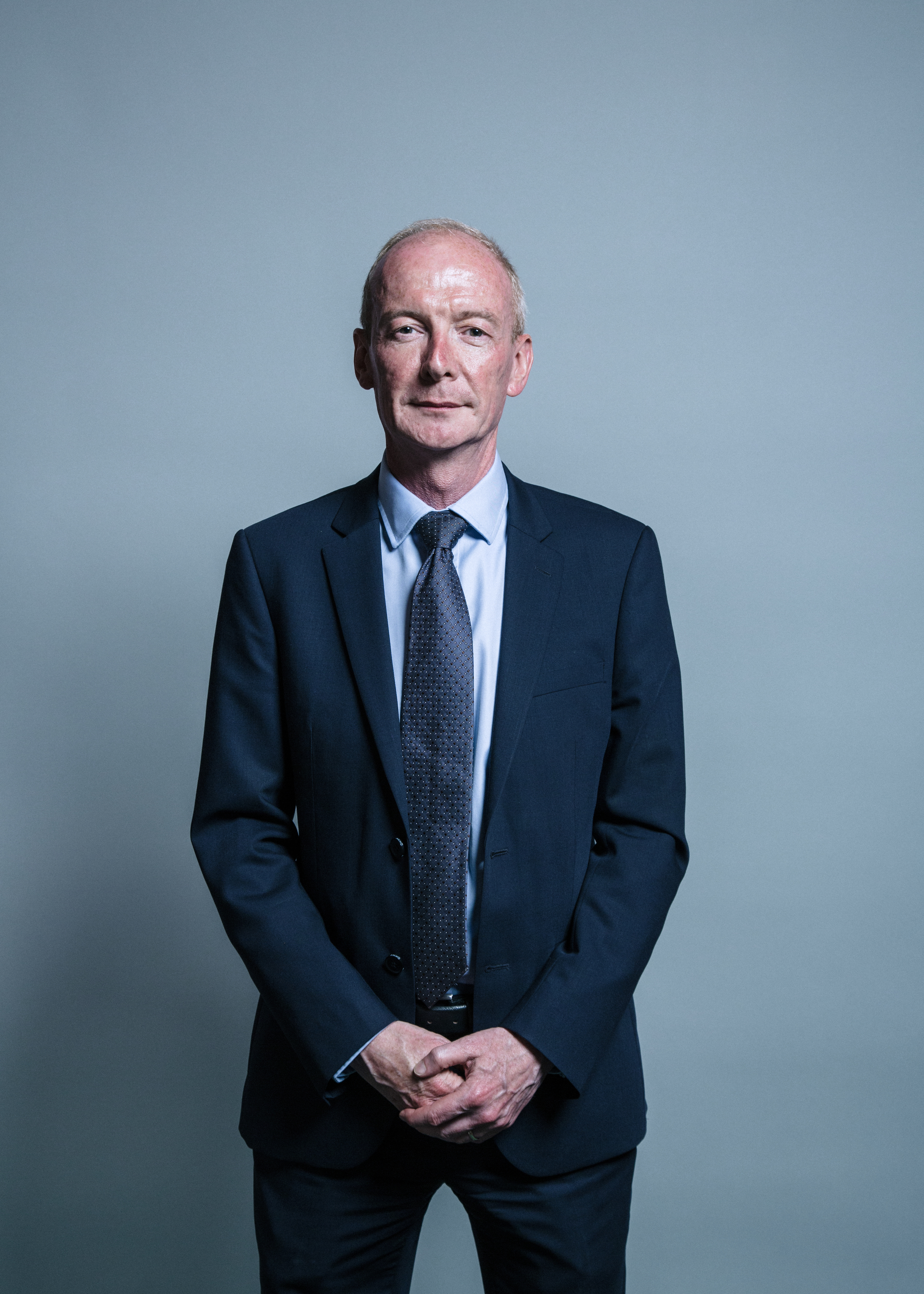
Official portrait, 2017

He supported Owen Smith in the failed attempt to replace Jeremy Corbyn in the 2016 Labour leadership election.

At the snap 2017 general election, McFadden was again re-elected, with an increased vote share of 58.2% and a decreased majority of 8,514. He served on the Committee on the Future Relationship with the European Union from October 2016 to May 2017 and again from September 2017 to November 2019.

McFadden was again re-elected at the 2019 general election, with a decreased vote share of 46.4% and a decreased majority of 1,235. In the 2020 Labour leadership election, McFadden supported and nominated Jess Phillips. In the concurrent deputy leadership election, he supported and nominated Ian Murray. He briefly served on the Business and Trade Select Committee from March to May 2020.

==== Starmer frontbench (2020–2024) ====
On 9 April 2020, McFadden was appointed as Shadow Economic Secretary to the Treasury by new party leader Keir Starmer. He was promoted to Shadow Chief Secretary to the Treasury in the November 2021 shadow cabinet reshuffle.

In the 2023 British shadow cabinet reshuffle, he was appointed Shadow Chancellor of the Duchy of Lancaster and Labour Party National Campaign Coordinator.

In May 2024, the criticism surrounding the expenses of McFadden, which had previously been reported by the Times in 2015, resurfaced after The Telegraph reported on further details in the controversy. It was revealed that despite the criticism in 2015, McFadden kept the arrangement for a further two years, during which the amount he claimed almost doubled to £40,250. He eventually sold the house in November 2017 for a loss of £12,950. A Labour spokesperson said that he had complied with IPSA rules "at all times", and commented that McFadden had sold the property for a loss, which he "paid for personally". In an interview with Sky News, McFadden continued to deny that he had broken any rules, and said that he had followed them as they were written at the time.

=== Return to government ===
==== Cabinet Office (2024–2025) ====
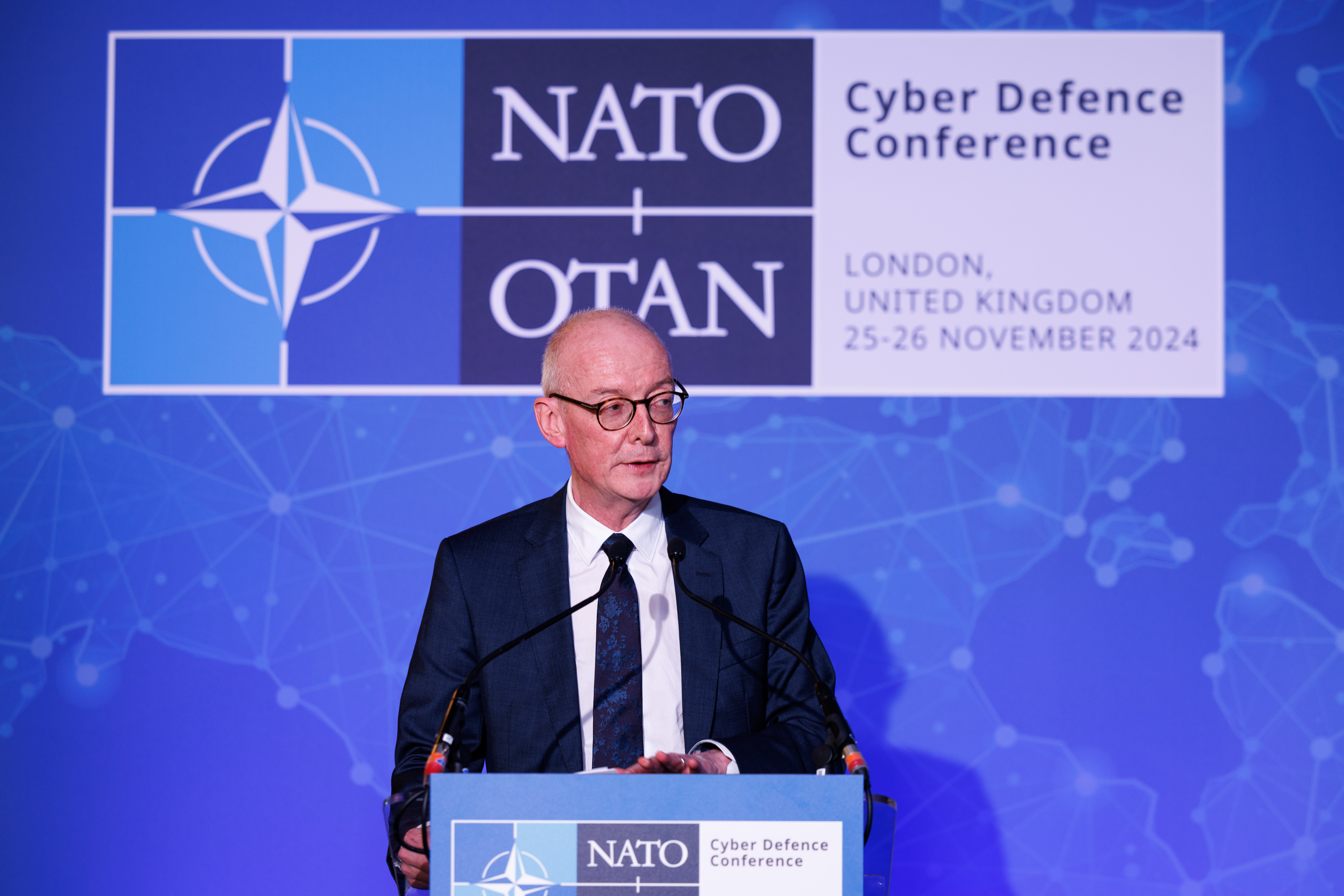
McFadden at the NATO Cyber Defence Conference in Lancaster House in 2024.

At the 2024 general election, McFadden was again re-elected, with an increased vote share of 50.3% and an increased majority of 9,188. After the general election, McFadden was appointed Chancellor of the Duchy of Lancaster and Minister for Intergovernmental Relations by Keir Starmer to serve in his ministry.

In May 2025, McFadden announced plans to move civil servants out of London in order to make savings in spending. The plans aimed to cut the number of roles in London by 12,000 as well as closing 11 offices to save an estimated £94 million by 2032. Under the plans, two new government campuses would be opened in Manchester and Aberdeen, and roles would be created in other cities and towns. McFadden said that the government wanted to make decision-making "closer to communities all across the UK, and argued that the plans would make the government one that "better reflects the country it serves".

In July 2025, McFadden published the UK Government resilience action plan, which focused on building resilience on all risks to the UK. McFadden stated that it was impossible to tackle all risks, but that the government was able to close "many of the gaps in our vulnerabilities and work together to make the UK a more resilient, more secure country." Under the plans, a new Cyber Resilience Index (CRI) to protect critical national infrastructure was created and a digital version of the National Security Risk Assessment (NSRA) was deployed.

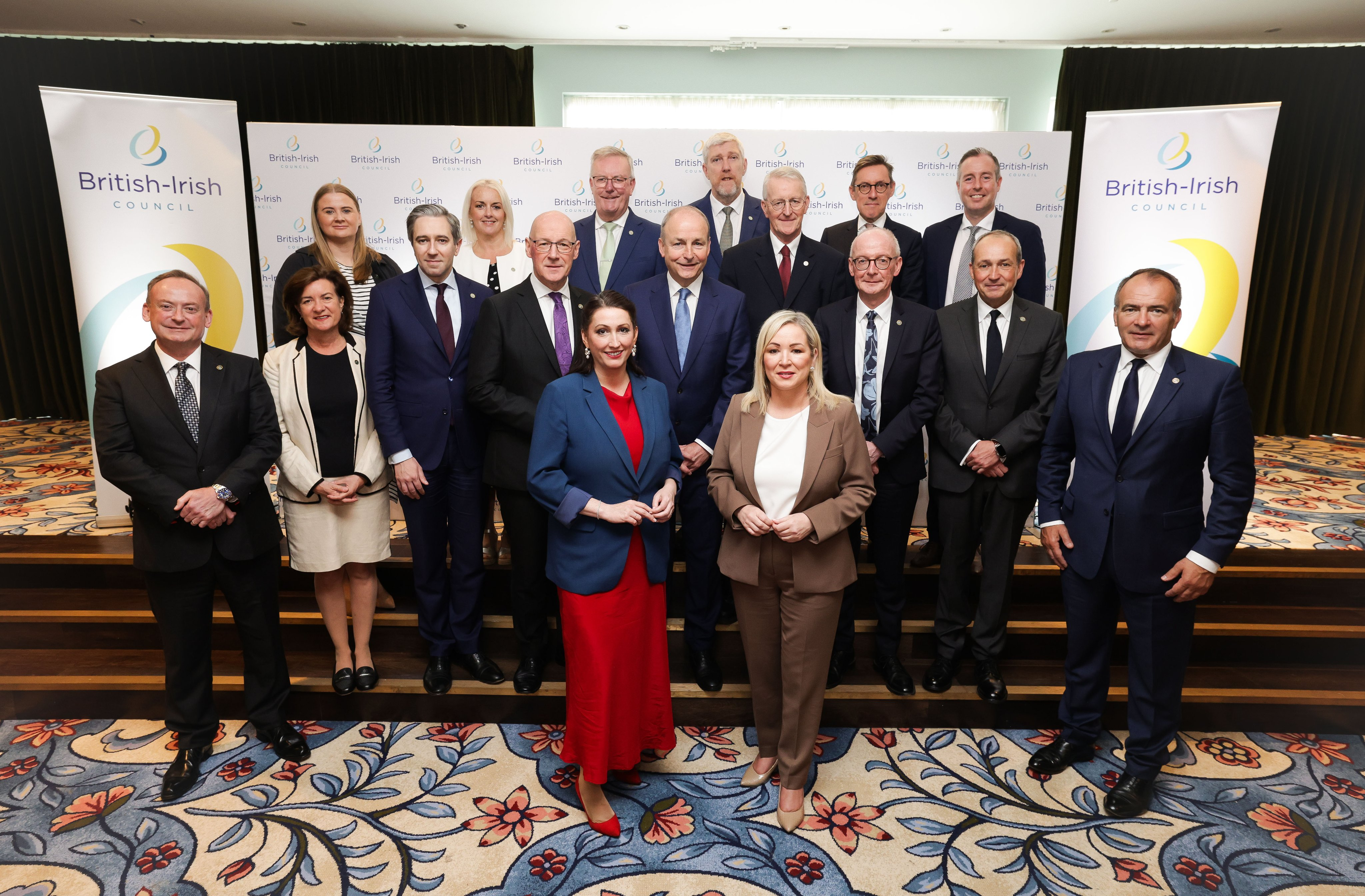
McFadden (standing third from right, middle row) at the British–Irish Council in June 2025, with leaders and First Ministers including John Swinney, Micheál Martin, Eluned Morgan, Simon Harris, Michelle O'Neill, Emma Little-Pengelly, and also Hilary Benn.

Also in July 2025, McFadden announced several government reforms, including that the Advisory Committee on Business Appointments (ACOBA) would be abolished and the Ethics and Integrity Commission (EIC) would be established. McFadden said that the latter would be created by "strengthening and reforming" the Committee on Standards in Public Life, and announced that it would have a "stronger mandate and expanded role" to "expand, promote and report" on the seven principles in public life. He also announced restrictions to ministerial severance pay-offs; under the changes, ministers who leave office after breaching the ministerial code or those who serve for fewer than six months would not get a severance payment. Additionally, any ministers who return to office would forgo their salary until the end of the three-month period in which they receive severance payment.

In August 2025, McFadden undertook a policy which restricted civil service internships to students from poorer families as part of a plan to make Whitehall more "representative". The main civil service internship designed to attract university students was made available only for those of "lower socio-economic backgrounds", based on the profession of their parents when they were aged 14. Those successful from the internship under the policy would be prioritised for entry to the Fast Stream, the programme entry to the civil service. McFadden argued that the country needed to "get more working class young people into the civil service so it harnesses the broadest range of talent and truly reflects the country", and contested that government makes better decisions when it "represents and understands the people we serve". The scheme drew criticism from Leader of the Opposition Kemi Badenoch, who pledged to scrap it under a Conservative government and instead "hire the best people".

==== Work and Pensions Secretary (2025–present) ====
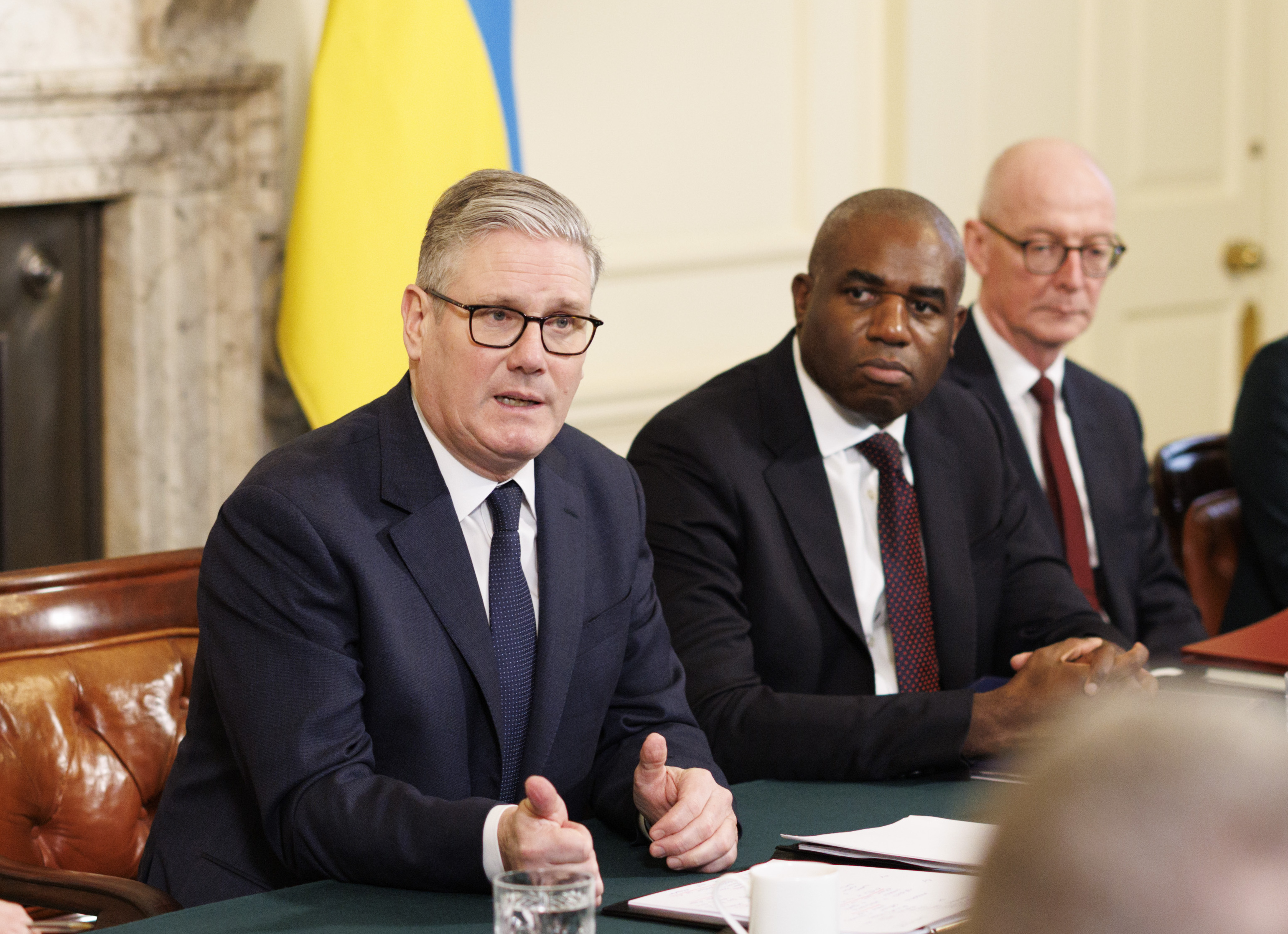
McFadden (right) attending cabinet with Starmer (left) and Deputy Prime Minister David Lammy (middle) in February 2026.

In the 2025 cabinet reshuffle that took place following the resignation of Angela Rayner, McFadden was appointed Secretary of State for Work and Pensions, replacing Liz Kendall. In the 2025 Labour deputy leadership election, McFadden supported Education Secretary Bridget Phillipson to replace Rayner as deputy leader.

In December 2025, McFadden announced reforms to universal credit, and the Personal Independence Payment (PIP), to reduce public spending, by extending the length of awards, from April 2026, for PIP claimants to reduce the backlog in the Work Capability Assessments (WCA). Under the policy, the interval between assessments to verify whether the condition of a claimant still qualified them for PIP was extended, which was designed to help healthcare professionals deliver more WCAs and conduct more face-to-face assessments. The Department for Work and Pensions (D) projected that the policy would save £1.9 billion by 2030/31. McFadden argued that the policy would create a "welfare state that supports those who need it while helping people into work and delivering fairness to the taxpayer".

In March 2026, McFadden announced a £1 billion youth unemployment scheme, to tackle the rising youth employment levels by aiming to create 200,000 jobs. Under the scheme, it was announced that companies were to be given a £3,000 grant for each hire of a person aged 18 to 24 who is on benefits and has been looking for a job for at least six months. Alongside this, a new apprenticeship incentive was announced, under which small and medium-sized businesses would be paid £2,000 for every new employee aged between 16 and 24 that they hired. The scheme was set to start in June 2026, while payments to companies were staggered under the policy. McFadden described the policy as a "new deal for young people" and that the public wanted a system which promoted work with "value for money".

In April 2026, the two-child benefit cap was formally scrapped under McFadden. The DWP had previously assessed that around 1.6 million children in larger families had been losing out on these means-tested benefits. McFadden said that the policy would lift 550,000 children out of poverty by the end of the parliament, and argued that it would "give every child the best start in life".

Ahead of the 2026 local elections, McFadden encouraged voters to support Keir Starmer as a leadership contest would "inject more risk", and argued that markets did not like "uncertainty". During the 2026 Labour leadership crisis, on 12 May, after a cabinet meeting, McFadden along with Kendall, Steve Reed and Peter Kyle spoke to the media and defended Starmer, rejecting calls for his resignation. McFadden stated that in the meeting nobody publicly challenged Starmer and that the government should "carry on".

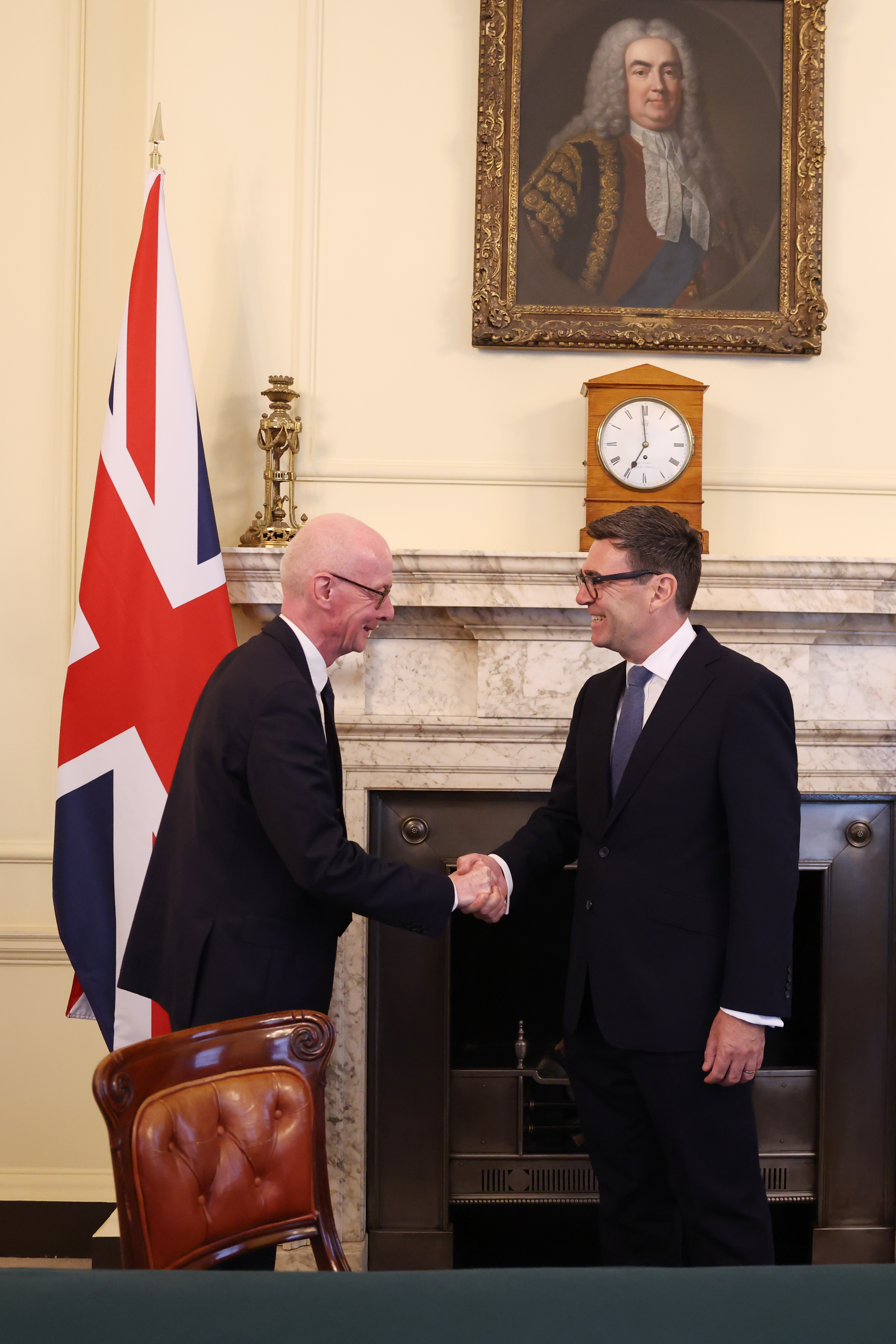
McFadden being reappointed by Andy Burnham on 20 July 2026.

During the Peter Mandelson scandal in June 2026, it was revealed that while Chancellor of the Duchy of Lancaster, on 24 May 2025, McFadden had texted Mandelson, "Every meeting I have [with Labour MPs] is: 'Who can we tax in order to pay benefits to others?' They're asking the wrong questions". In an interview with The Times later that month, McFadden said that he stood by the messages, and stated that "no one should really be surprised", and added that there should not be any "great shock in my desire to change the system". In the same interview, he argued that the universal credit benefits system was broken and needed a "complete overhaul".

After the resignation of Starmer, the media speculated that McFadden might be a potential candidate for Chancellor of the Exchequer under Andy Burnham. The Financial Times reported on 30 June that Burnham had held discussions with McFadden's team about employment reforms, and that McFadden wished to stay in post under Burnham. The Huffington Post reported that numerous Labour MPs supported McFadden in order to prevent the appointment of Energy Secretary Ed Miliband as Chancellor. On 9 July, McFadden nominated Burnham in the leadership election.

On 20 July 2026, Burnham reappointed McFadden as Work and Pensions Secretary in his ministry.

== Political positions ==
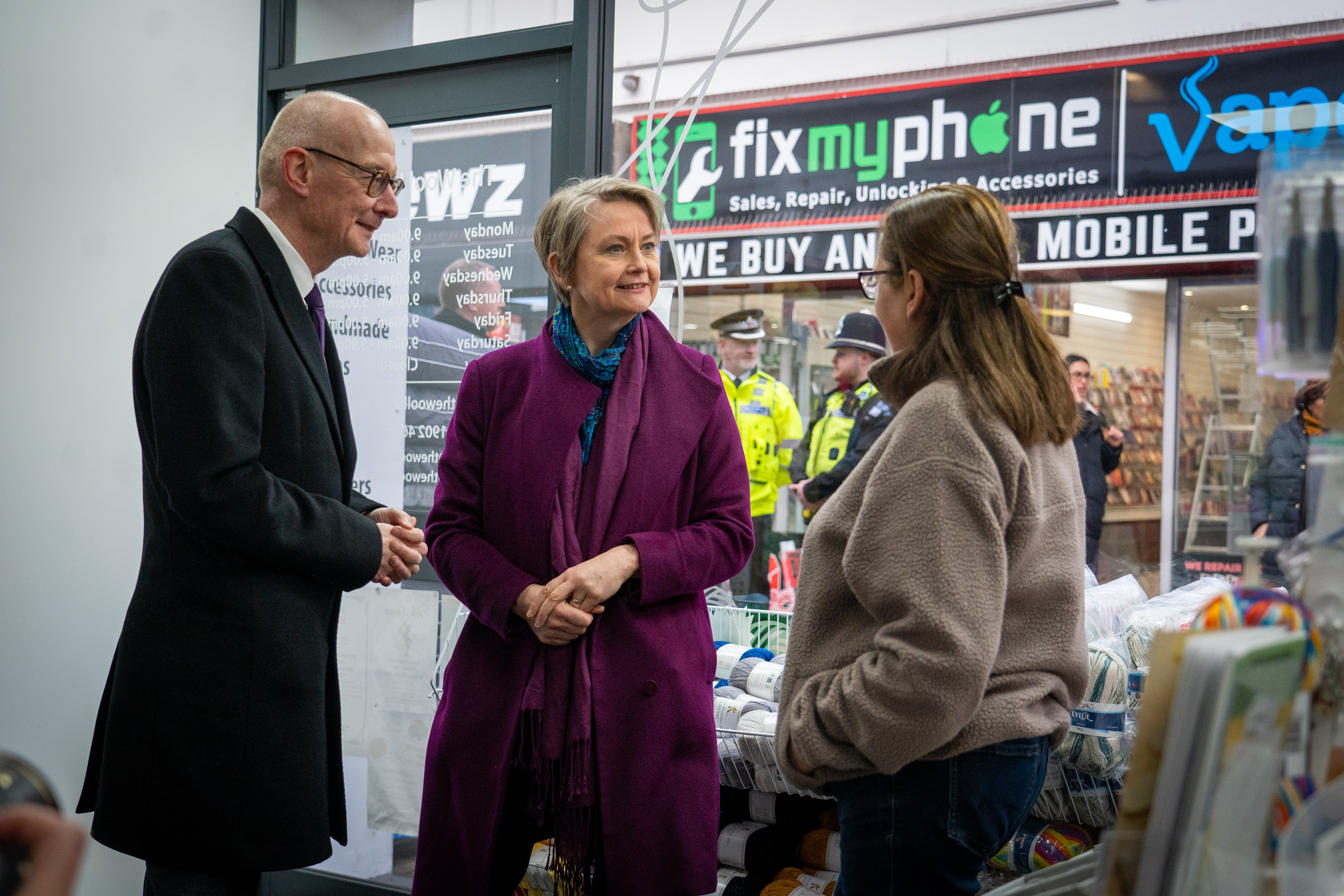
McFadden with Home Secretary Yvette Cooper in Wolverhampton, 2025.

McFadden is associated with the Labour centre-left Labour First grouping. Peter Mandelson described his political ideology as centre-left. He has been described as a key ally of Prime Minister Keir Starmer. The New Statesman described him in 2023 as "Labour's great survivor".

=== Foreign policy ===
==== Brexit ====
McFadden voted in favour of the European Union (Notification of Withdrawal) Bill to trigger Article 50 and exit the European Union. He was opposed to a no-deal Brexit and supports a close trading relationship with the European Union.

==== Israel and Middle East issues ====
McFadden is a vice-chair of Labour Friends of Israel.

In 2023, McFadden condemned October 7 attacks on Israel and declined to comment on a friends of Palestine event that had been planned at the Labour conference in Liverpool.

In April 2024, McFadden rejected calls for a boycott on arms sales to Israel, and said that "we are selling arms to allies who are abiding by international humanitarian law". He called for the government to release the "proper legal evidence" if there was any such that indicated that Israel was not abiding by international law. He went on to argue that "we always want Israel or any ally to abide by international humanitarian law."

In December 2024, McFadden stated that the government "would always support Israel's right to defend itself and make itself secure". He also attributed the fall of the Assad regime in part to Israel, arguing that it had "partly occurred because of Israeli action against Iranian proxies around the region, and that has left Iran weakened and that is partly why the Assad regime has fallen."

In March 2025, McFadden rejected calls for an arms embargo on Israel, stating "we don't impose an arms embargo. We have arms trade with Israel, and you know, that's not going to result in an embargo." McFadden instead supported Britain using "whatever diplomatic influence we have" to obtain a ceasfire. He went on to argue that the British government "would always stick up for Israel's right to defend itself", but that it did not believe "the cutting off of power and essential supplies to a whole population is justified." He also said that the government had said "publicly" what they thought of collective punishment and said "we don't want to see that happening".

==== United States and Donald Trump ====
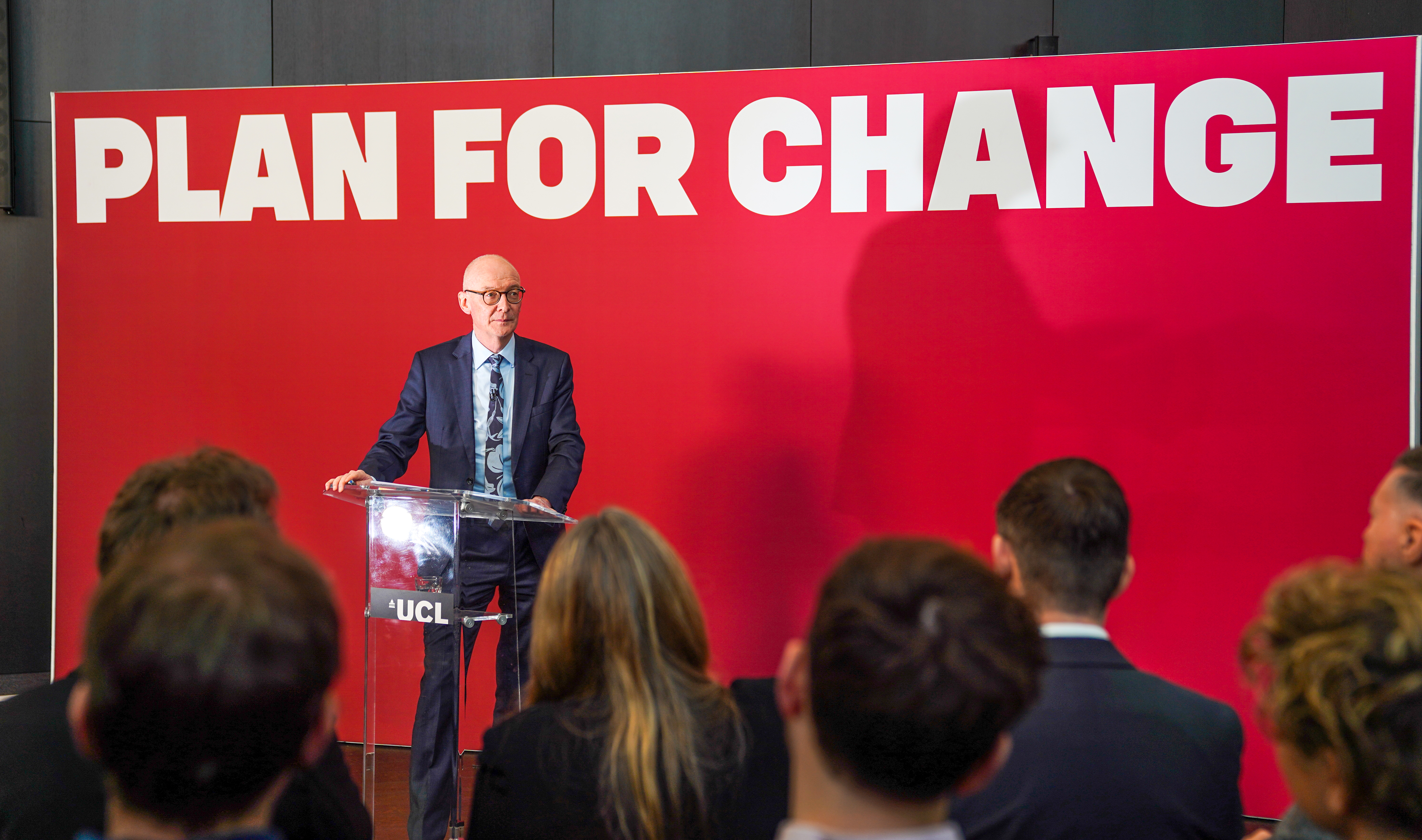
McFadden in 2024.

McFadden has been supportive of the United Kingdom–United States relationship. In January 2021, McFadden described the January 6 attacks on the United States capitol as "terrible and disgusting", and asserted that it was the "culmination of the Trump presidency".

In November 2024, following the election of Donald Trump as president of the United States, McFadden rejected concerns that previous comments by members of the Labour cabinet would harm relations, including Foreign Secretary David Lammy having previously referred to Trump as a "Nazi sympathiser". McFadden argued that the alliance with the United States was "much more important" than "all that". He went on to say "it is so deep. It Is based on real common interests in defence and security. It's really serious, it's really longstanding." He also suggested that the decision to make JD Vance as his running mate and the support of Elon Musk, who both had previously been critical of Trump, was evidence that the remarks would be overcome.

Following a public fallout between Trump and Starmer over the 2026 Iran War, McFadden maintained that the relationship between the two countries was "good and close", but that it did not mean the United Kingdom would "always have to support every intervention and every action that the United States chooses to take." He described the second presidency of Donald Trump as "transactional" and argued that the relationship would "outlast all personalities involved".

==== China ====
In 2024, McFadden, referring to an American assessment of China, argued that the cyber-threat from China was "changing"; he stated that the threat was previously focused on spying and influencing. He asserted that this had shifted to getting ready to "disrupt essential infrastructure".

In May 2025, McFadden warned that China was becoming a "cyber superpower". He asserted that China had "the sophistication, the scale and the seriousness" to pose a serious national challenge to the UK.

==== Russia and Ukraine ====
In November 2024, McFadden argued that the UK was in an AI arms race with Russia, and also warned that Moscow was preparing to launch a wave of cyber attacks against the United Kingdom.

In March 2025, McFadden stated that countries could not be "dragooned" into a coalition of the willing in protecting Ukraine as it was their decision as "sovereign countries", but called on other European countries to "step up" on the issue.

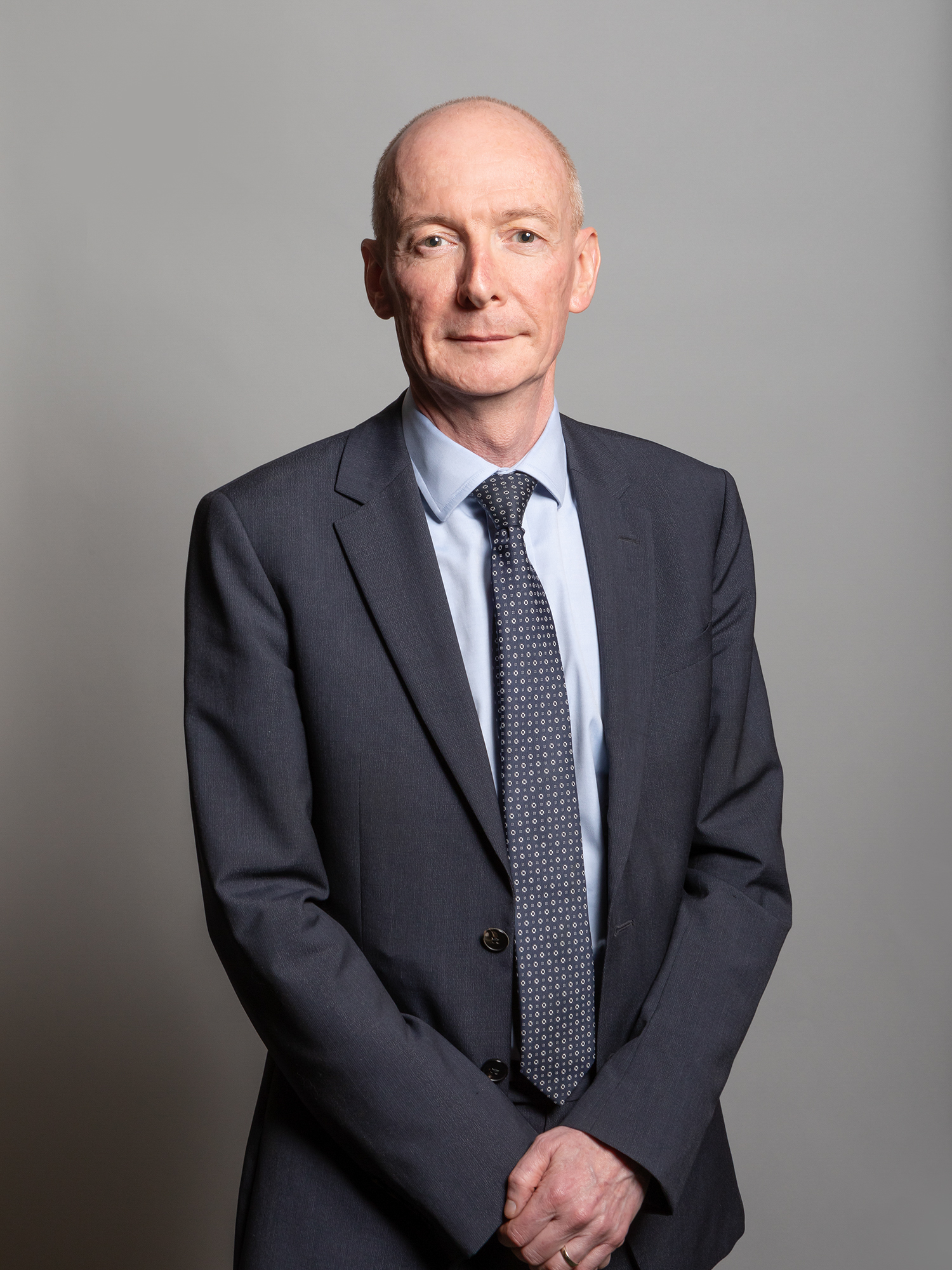
Official portrait, 2020

=== Social issues and individual liberties ===
==== Transgender issues ====
Following the For Women Scotland Ltd v The Scottish Ministers verdict which ruled that definitions of women and sex under the equality act, McFadden argued that there would not be "toilet police", but that "people use the facilities of the biological sex" was the "logical consequence" of the verdict.

==== Same-sex marriage ====
McFadden voted in favour of introducing same-sex marriage in England and Wales in 2013, and also voted in favour of introducing same-sex marriage in Northern Ireland in 2019.

==== Assisted dying ====
McFadden voted in favour of assisted dying in 2015, and also in favour of the Terminally Ill Adults (End of Life) Bill.

In December 2024, McFadden suggested that patients may have to pay for assisted dying. In an interview with the Times Radio, McFadden pointed out the Switzerland system in which people had to pay for the services. He stated all still "had to be considered" and "those questions of costs, safeguards, all the issues that have been raised have to be considered during the committee stage, the clause-by-clause examination of the bill. And that's the right way to do it because it's a huge change." He also argued that a fully state-funded system was a "long way to go."

==== Abortion ====
McFadden voted in favour of decriminalising abortion in England and Wales in 2025.

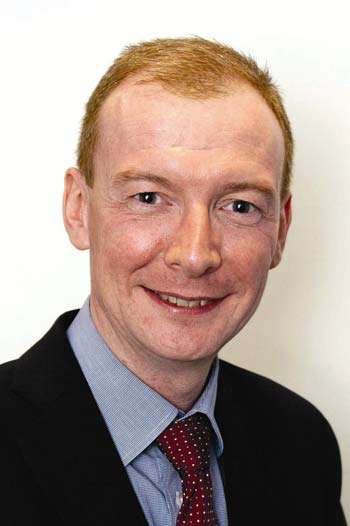
Official government portrait, 2008

=== Domestic policy ===
==== Bank of England ====
McFadden was critical of the Bank of England under governor Mark Carney in 2014 due to hints over possible interest rate rises. McFadden argued that businesses and consumers were "left not really knowing where they stand" by statements made by the Bank. He assessed that the bank was "one day hot, one day cold", and behaving "a bit like a sort of unreliable boyfriend".

==== Welfare reform ====
In September 2025, McFadden argued that welfare reform "must happen" and that it was "really important". He stated that "at the moment this system is unhealthy for people and in the long run is pushing up the benefits bill because we're not getting the help to people who could work." He also argued that the system around health-related benefits created a "binary divide" which separated people into fit for work and not fit for work in an "unhealthy" way.

==== Digital ID ====
In 2025, McFadden, regarding the proposed UK digital ID, identified the Estonian identity card as a model for the scheme and said that British forms of identity had not kept apace with technological developments. He also suggested that digital ID could help solve the small boats crisis and help prevent benefits fraud.

==== Low Pay Commission ====
McFadden opposes abolishing the Low Pay Commission to give ministers more control over setting the minimum wage. In an interview with City A.M. in 2026, he argued that there had been a "degree of admiration" from other countries for the model and that it had "worked very well for the UK for many years".

== Personal life ==
McFadden and his wife, Marianna, have a son and a daughter. Marianna McFadden is the deputy General Secretary of the Labour Party. They were ranked as the second most powerful Westminster couple by Politico in February 2026.

McFadden is a supporter of Celtic F.C. He is a Roman Catholic.

== Honours and recognition ==
McFadden was sworn into the Privy Council of the United Kingdom in 2008, entitling him to by styled with the honorary prefix "the Right Honourable" for life.

In 2023, McFadden ranked twenty-fifth in the New Statesman's Left Power List due to his desire to enforce fiscal discipline.

Parliament of the United Kingdom
| Preceded by Dennis Turner | Member of Parliament for Wolverhampton South East; 2005–present | Incumbent |
Political offices
| Preceded by Jim Fitzpatrick | Minister of State for Employment Relations; 2007–2009 | Succeeded by The Lord Young |
| Preceded by Gareth Thomas | Minister of State for Business; 2009–2010 | Succeeded by Mark Prisk |
| Preceded by Peter Mandelson | Shadow Secretary of State for Business, Innovation and Skills; 2010 | Succeeded by John Denham |
| Preceded by Gareth Thomas | Shadow Minister for Europe; 2014–2016 | Succeeded by Pat Glass |
| Preceded by Jonathan Reynolds | Shadow Economic Secretary to the Treasury; 2020–2021 | Succeeded by Tulip Siddiq |
| Preceded by Bridget Phillipson | Shadow Chief Secretary to the Treasury; 2021–2023 | Succeeded by Darren Jones |
| Preceded by Angela Rayner | Shadow Chancellor of the Duchy of Lancaster; 2023–2024 | Succeeded by Oliver Dowden |
Government offices
| Preceded by Robert Hill | Political Secretary to the Prime Minister; 2002–2005 | Succeeded by John McTernan |
| Preceded by Oliver Dowden | Chancellor of the Duchy of Lancaster; 2024–2025 | Succeeded by Darren Jones |
| Preceded by Liz Kendall | Secretary of State for Work and Pensions; 2025– | Incumbent |
