= 2008 Scottish Labour leadership election =

Scottish Labour leadership election

2008 Scottish Labour Party leadership election
- 1 August – 13 September 2008
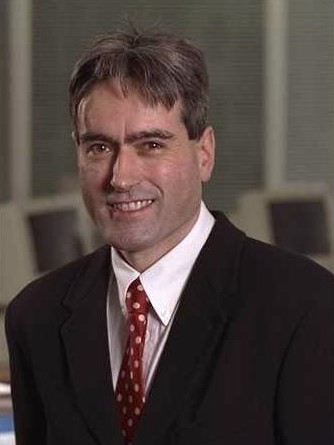

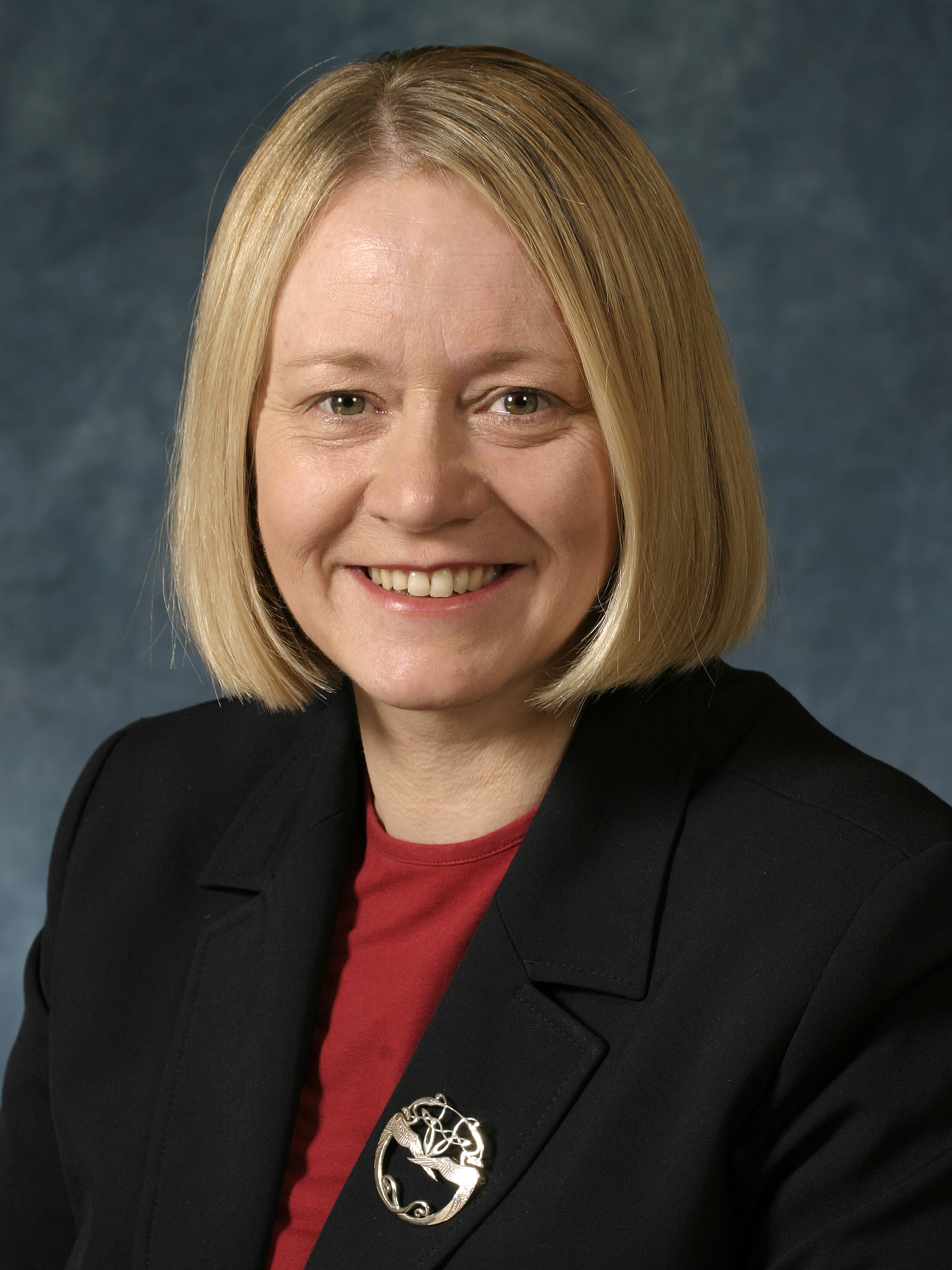

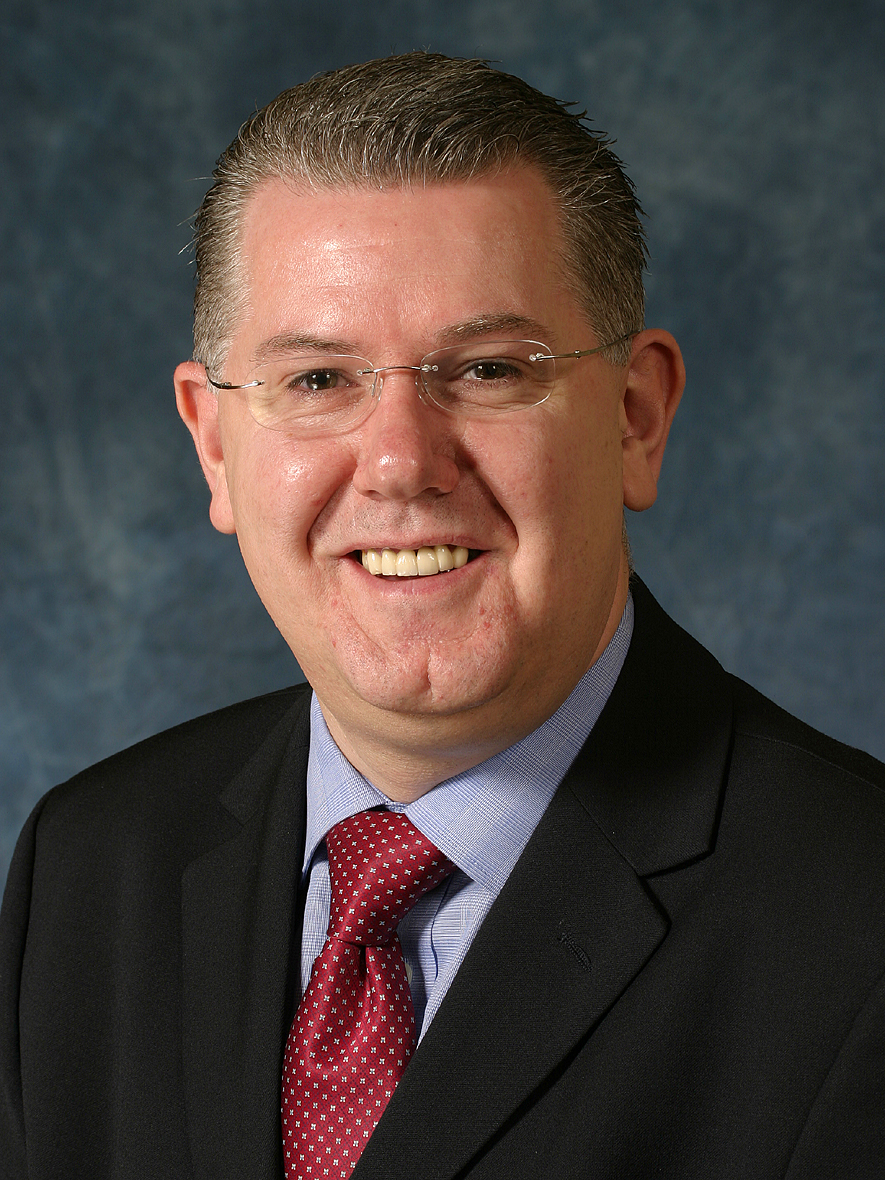
Candidate	Iain Gray	Cathy Jamieson	Andy Kerr
First preferences	46.0%	33.3%	20.7%
Second round	57.8%	42.2%	—
Leader before election
Wendy Alexander
Elected Leader
Iain Gray

The 2008 Scottish Labour Party leadership election was an internal party election to choose a new leader of the Labour Party in the Scottish Parliament, and was triggered following the resignation of Wendy Alexander following a row over donations to her own leadership campaign in 2007. Iain Gray won the contest and was announced as leader on 13 September 2008.

It was the second Scottish Labour leadership election in as many years, the first being caused by the resignation of Jack McConnell, following the Scottish National Party's victory over Labour in the 2007 Scottish Parliament election, however in this election, Alexander was unopposed, meaning that no ballot actually took place.

The timetable for the election was finalised on Monday 28 July, having been put on hold for a month to allow the party to focus on the Glasgow East by-election, which ultimately saw the Scottish National Party overturn a 13,507 Labour majority to gain the seat. Nominations closed at noon on Friday 1 August with the result being declared on Saturday 13 September.

A deputy leadership election was held alongside the leadership election following the resignation of Cathy Jamieson on 28 July. Johann Lamont was elected deputy leader.

== Successfully nominated candidates ==
- Iain Gray — 13 nominations
- Cathy Jamieson — 12 nominations
- Andy Kerr — 10 nominations

Source: Scottish Labour

All three declared candidates received more than five nominations from MSPs, which was the minimum requirement for them to get onto the ballot paper by the close of nominations at 12:00 UTC+1 on 1 August 2008

=== Nominations ===
Candidates are initially nominated by their parliamentary colleagues from within the Scottish Parliament, following which Westminster MPs, constituency Labour parties and affiliated trade union organisation can submit 'supporting nominations', providing their backing to a specific candidates. These nominations can be seen in the tables below;

Nominations from MSPs
Iain Gray MSP	Cathy Jamieson MSP	Andy Kerr MSP
Claire Baker MSP	Bill Butler MSP	Jackie Baillie MSP
Richard Baker MSP	Malcolm Chisholm MSP	Karen Gillon MSP
Sarah Boyack MSP	Cathie Craigie MSP	Andy Kerr MSP
Rhona Brankin MSP	Patricia Ferguson MSP	Ken Macintosh MSP
Margaret Curran MSP	Marlyn Glen MSP	Paul Martin MSP
Helen Eadie MSP	Rhoda Grant MSP	Frank McAveety MSP
George Foulkes MSP	Hugh Henry MSP	Michael McMahon MSP
Charlie Gordon MSP	Cathy Jamieson MSP	Duncan McNeil MSP
Iain Gray MSP	James Kelly MSP	Pauline McNeill MSP
Des McNulty MSP	Elaine Murray MSP	Peter Peacock MSP
John Park MSP	Cathy Peattie MSP
Richard Simpson MSP	Karen Whitefield MSP
David Stewart MSP

Supporting Nominations
Iain Gray MSP	Cathy Jamieson MSP	Andy Kerr MSP
Anne Begg MP	Katy Clark MP	Jim Devine MP
Russell Brown MP	David Hamilton MP	Nigel Griffiths MP
Brian Donohoe MP	Sandra Osborne MP	Jim McGovern MP
Frank Doran MP	Jim Sheridan MP
Tom Harris MP	Gavin Strang MP
Eric Joyce MP
Mark Lazarowicz MP
Tommy McAvoy MP
Ann McKechin MP
Rosemary McKenna MP
Anne Moffat MP
John Robertson MP
David Martin MEP
Catherine Stihler MEP
Community	ASLEF	Scottish Labour Students
CWU	NUM Scotland
GMB Scotland	Scottish Co-operative Party
NULSC (Scottish Area)	Socialist Education Association Scotland
SERA Scotland	UCATT
Unite (Amicus Section)	UNISON
Unite (T&G Section)	Usdaw
Aberdeen North CLP	Airdrie & Shotts CLP	Dundee East CLP
Aberdeen South CLP	Ayr, Carrick and Cumnock CLP	Dundee West CLP
Dumfriesshire, Clydesdale and Tweeddale CLP	Coatbridge, Chryston and Bellshill CLP	East Dunbartonshire CLP
East Lothian CLP	Dumfries & Galloway CLP	East Kilbride, Strathaven and Lesmahagow CLP
Edinburgh North and Leith CLP	East Renfrewshire CLP	Glasgow Central CLP
Edinburgh South West CLP	Glasgow South West CLP	Glasgow North East CLP
Edinburgh West CLP	Glasgow North CLP	Glasgow North West CLP
Falkirk CLP	Kilmarnock and Loudoun CLP	Inverclyde CLP
Kirkcaldy and Cowdenbeath CLP	Paisley and Renfrewshire North CLP	Lanark and Hamilton East CLP
Linlithgow and East Falkirk CLP		Moray CLP
Livingston CLP		Na h-Eileanan an Iar CLP
Midlothian CLP		North Ayrshire and Arran CLP
North East Fife CLP		West Dunbartonshire CLP
Rutherglen and Hamilton West CLP
West Aberdeenshire and Kincardine CLP

== Result ==
The election took place using Alternative Vote in an electoral college, with a third of the votes allocated to Labour's MSPs, Scottish MPs and Scottish MEPs, a third to individual members of the Scottish Labour Party, and a third to individual members of affiliated organisations, mainly trade unions.

In order to be elected, one candidate must have achieved a majority of votes, i.e. 50% plus 1 vote.

=== Round 1 ===
Candidate	Affiliated members (33.3%)	Individual members (33.3%)	Elected members (33.3%)	Total
Iain Gray	39.2%	45.2%	53.7%	46.0%
Cathy Jamieson	42.3%	30.8%	26.8%	33.3%
Andy Kerr	18.6%	24.0%	19.5%	20.7%
Andy Kerr eliminated

=== Round 2 ===
Candidate	Affiliated members (33.3%)	Individual members (33.3%)	Elected members (33.3%)	Total
Iain Gray	48.5%	57.3%	67.6%	57.8%
Cathy Jamieson	51.5%	42.7%	32.4%	42.2%
Iain Gray elected leader

Source: The Citizen: Campaigning for Socialism

== Suggested candidates not standing ==
The following either publicly suggested they were considering standing for election or received media speculation to that effect. However, at the close of nominations they had not been nominated by any MSPs.

- Charlie Gordon
- Tom McCabe
- Margaret Curran. Curran was considered to be a probable candidate; however, Curran subsequently stood in and lost the Glasgow East by-election on 24 July, raising questions over any leadership ambitions. Later stated she supported Gray.
- Ken Macintosh. Macintosh nominated Andy Kerr on 31 July.

== Timeline of events ==
Date	Event
28 June 2008	• Wendy Alexander announces her immediate resignation as Scottish Labour leader. • Cathy Jamieson takes over as acting leader.
29 June 2008	• Cathy Jamieson announces her intention to stand for leadership.
30 June 2008	• Labour MP David Marshall resigns his parliamentary seat of Glasgow East due to ill health, prompting a by-election. • Margaret Curran says she is "actively considering" whether or not to run for leadership.
1 July 2008	• Charlie Gordon, the MSP who accepted the illegal donation that ultimately led to Wendy Alexander's resignation, announces he intends to stand in the leadership election.
2 July 2008	• Scottish Labour announce the postponement of the leadership election in order to concentrate on Glasgow East by-election.
7 July 2008	• Scottish Labour select Margaret Curran as their candidate for the Glasgow East by-election.
24 July 2008 and 25 July 2008	• Glasgow East by-election: The SNP's John Mason overturns previous Labour majority of 13,507 to gain the seat causing what many dub a 'political earthquake'.
28 July 2008	• Scottish Labour's procedure committee meet and agree the timetable for the leadership election. • Cathy Jamieson announces her resignation as deputy leader of Scottish Labour, meaning a deputy leadership election will be held alongside the leadership election. • Nominations for both elections open. • Iain Gray formally announces his candidacy in the leadership election.
29 July 2008	• Cathy Jamieson formally launches her campaign for the leadership.
30 July 2008	• Scottish Labour confirm that both Cathy Jamieson and Iain Gray have received sufficient nominations and are therefore official candidates.
31 July 2008	• Scottish Labour confirm that Andy Kerr has received sufficient nominations and is therefore the third official candidate.
1 August 2008	• Nominations closed with three candidates having been successfully nominated.
13 September 2008	• Declaration of result made – Iain Gray elected Scottish Labour leader.

== See also ==
- 2008 Scottish Labour deputy leadership election
