= 2008 Scottish Labour deputy leadership election =

2008 Scottish Labour leadership election
- 1 August – 13 September 2008
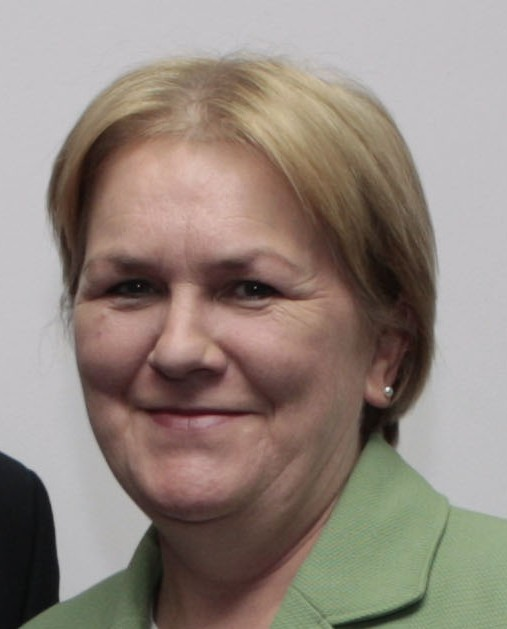

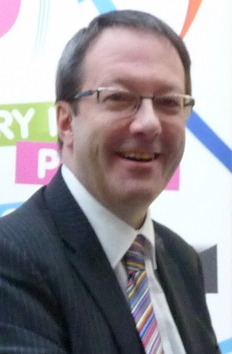
Candidate	Johann Lamont	Bill Butler
Overall Result	60.2%	39.8%
Affiliated Unions	51.6%	48.4%
Party members	54.9%	45.1%
MPs, MSPs & MEPs	74.0%	26.0%
Leader before election
Cathy Jamieson
Elected Leader
Johann Lamont

The 2008 Scottish Labour Party deputy leadership election was an internal party election to choose a new deputy leader of the Labour Party in the Scottish Parliament, and was triggered following the resignation of Cathy Jamieson, who stood down in order to campaign in the leadership election which is being held alongside the deputy leadership election. Johann Lamont won the election and was elected deputy leader on Saturday 13 September.

The timetable for the election was finalised on Monday 28 July, and is identical to that of the leadership election. Nominations closed on Friday 1 August with the result declaration being made on 13 September.

== Successfully nominated candidates ==
- Johann Lamont – nominated by 18 MSPs
- Bill Butler – nominated by 7 MSPs

Both of the declared candidates received more than five nominations from MSPs, which was the minimum requirement for them to get onto the ballot paper, by the close of nominations at 12:00 UTC+1 on 1 August 2008.

=== Nominations ===
Candidates are initially nominated by their parliamentary colleagues from within the Scottish Parliament, following which Westminster MPs, constituency Labour parties and affiliated trade union organisation can submit 'supporting nominations', providing their backing to a specific candidates. These nominations can be seen in the tables below:

Nominations from MSPs
Johann Lamont MSP	Bill Butler MSP
Jackie Baillie MSP	Bill Butler MSP
Sarah Boyack MSP	Cathy Craigie MSP
Malcolm Chisholm MSP	Patricia Ferguson MSP
Margaret Curran MSP	Marlyn Glen MSP
Helen Eadie MSP	Cathy Peattie MSP
George Foulkes MSP	Elaine Smith MSP
Karen Gillon MSP	Karen Whitefield MSP
Trish Godman MSP
Rhoda Grant MSP
James Kelly MSP
Johann Lamont MSP
Frank McAveety MSP
Duncan McNeil MSP
Pauline McNeill MSP
Des McNulty MSP
Elaine Murray MSP
Richard Simpson MSP
David Whitton MSP

Supporting Nominations
Johann Lamont MSP	Bill Butler MSP
Anne Begg MP	Katy Clark MP
Brian Donohoe MP	David Hamilton MP
Tom Harris MP	Ann McKechin MP
Eric Joyce MP	Anne Moffat MP
Thomas McAvoy MP	Jim Sheridan MP
Jim McGovern MP	Gavin Strang MP
Rosemary McKenna MP	David Martin MEP
Sandra Osborne MP	Catherine Stihler MEP
Community	ASLEF
GMB Scotland	CWU
NUM Scotland	TSSA
UCATT	Socialist Health Association
Unite (Amicus Section)	Socialist Education Association Scotland
Unite (T&G Section)	Scottish Co-operative Party
SERA Scotland	UNISON
Scottish Labour Students	Usdaw
Aberdeen South CLP	Ayr, Carrick and Cumnock CLP
Central Ayrshire CLP	Aberdeen North CLP
Dumfriesshire, Clydesdale and Tweeddale CLP	Argyll and Bute CLP
Dumfries & Galloway CLP	Coatbridge, Chryston and Bellshill CLP
East Dunbartonshire CLP	Dundee East CLP
East Renfrewshire CLP	Dundee West CLP
East Kilbride, Strathaven and Lesmahagow CLP	Edinburgh West CLP
East Lothian CLP	Glasgow North CLP
Edinburgh North and Leith CLP	Kilmarnock and Loudoun CLP
Edinburgh South West CLP	Livingston CLP
Falkirk CLP	Midlothian CLP
Glasgow Central CLP	North Ayrshire and Arran CLP
Glasgow North East CLP	Paisley and Renfrewshire North CLP
Glasgow North West CLP
Glasgow South West CLP
Inverclyde CLP
Kirkcaldy and Cowdenbeath CLP
Moray CLP
Na h-Eileanan an Iar CLP
North East Fife CLP
Orkney CLP
Rutherglen and Hamilton West CLP
West Dunbartonshire CLP

== Result ==
The election took place using Alternative Vote in an electoral college, with a third of the votes allocated to Labour's MSPs, Scottish MPs and Scottish MEPs, a third to individual members of the Scottish Labour Party, and a third to individual members of affiliated organisations, mainly trade unions.

In order to be elected, one candidate must have achieved a majority of votes, i.e. 50% plus 1 vote.

Candidate	Affiliated members (33.3%)	Individual members (33.3%)	Elected members (33.3%)	Overall Result
Johann Lamont	39.8%	60.4%	67.1%	55.8%
Bill Butler	52.0%	32.7%	20.3%	35.0%

Source: The Citizen: Campaigning for Socialism

== Suggested candidates not standing ==
The following either publicly suggested they would stand for election or received media speculation to that effect. However, at the close of nominations they had not been nominated by any MSPs.

- Des McNulty has said he would "be inviting support from Holyrood colleagues". McNulty ultimately nominated Johann Lamont.
- Margaret Curran. Originally intended to stand in the leadership election; however she subsequently stood in and lost the Glasgow East by-election on 24 July, raising questions over any leadership or deputy leadership ambitions. Curran ultimately nominated Johann Lamont.

== Timeline of events ==
Date	Event
28 July 2008	• Cathy Jamieson stands down as deputy leader of Scottish Labour in order to concentrate on her campaign in the leadership election; however, she remains Acting Leader. • Scottish Labour's procedure committee meet and agree the timetable for the leadership and deputy leadership elections.
30 July 2008	• Scottish Labour confirm that both Bill Butler and Johann Lamont have received sufficient nominations and are therefore official candidates.
1 August 2008	• Nominations closed with two candidates having been successfully nominated.
13 September 2008	• Declaration of result made - Johann Lamont elected deputy leader of Scottish Labour.

== See also ==
- 2008 Scottish Labour Party leadership election
