= 2007 Labour Party leadership election =

Labour Party leadership elections were held in the following countries in 2007:

- 2007 Israeli Labor Party leadership election
- 2007 Labour Party leadership election (Ireland)
- 2007 Labour Party leadership election (UK) (timeline)
- 2007 Scottish Labour leadership election

== See also ==
- 2008 Labour Party leadership election (disambiguation)
