= Norman Hogg, Baron Hogg of Cumbernauld =

Scottish Labour Co-op politician

The Right Honourable The Lord Hogg of Cumbernauld CBE FSA Scot. DL JP

Opposition Deputy Chief Whip of the House of Commons
- In office 11 November 1983 – 16 July 1987
- Leader: Neil Kinnock
- Preceded by: Walter Harrison
- Succeeded by: Don Dixon

Member of the House of Lords
- Lord Temporal
- Life peerage 24 September 1997 – 8 October 2008

Member of Parliament for Cumbernauld and Kilsyth East Dunbartonshire (1979–1983)
- In office 3 May 1979 – 8 April 1997
- Preceded by: Margaret Bain
- Succeeded by: Rosemary McKenna

Personal details
- Born: 12 March 1938
- Died: 8 October 2008 (aged 70)
- Party: Labour
- Education: Ruthrieston Secondary School

Norman Hogg, Baron Hogg of Cumbernauld CBE, DL, JP, LLD, FSA Scot. (12 March 1938 – 8 October 2008) was a Scottish Labour Party politician.

Educated at Ruthrieston Secondary School in Aberdeen, he worked for Aberdeen Town Council from 1953 to 1967 and then as a District Officer for NALGO from 1967 to 1979. His father, also Norman Hogg, was the Lord Provost of Aberdeen from 1964 to 1967 and he was made a Deputy Lieutenant of Aberdeen in 1970. At the 1979 general election, he was elected as Member of Parliament for Dunbartonshire East, defeating the Scottish National Party's Margaret Bain.

When his constituency was abolished in boundary changes for the 1983 general election, he was elected for the new Cumbernauld and Kilsyth constituency, which he represented at Westminster until he stood down at the 1997 general election.

During his time in the House of Commons he was a member of the Select Committee on Scottish Affairs from 1979 to 1982, Chairman of the Scottish Parliamentary Labour Group in 1981–82, Scottish Labour Whip in 1982–83, Deputy Chief Opposition Whip from 1983 to 1987, Scottish Affairs Spokesman in 1987–88, and a Member of the Public Accounts Committee in 1991–92.

Hogg was created a life peer as Baron Hogg of Cumbernauld, of Cumbernauld in the County of North Lanarkshire on 24 September 1997. He was a Member of the House of Lords Delegated Powers and Regulatory Reform Committee from 1999 to 2002 and was Chairman of the Scottish Peers Association from 2002 and a Deputy Speaker of the House of Lords from 2002.

Hogg was also appointed Lord High Commissioner to the General Assembly of the Church of Scotland in 1998 and 1999.

Hogg died after a long illness on 8 October 2008, at the age of 70.

Parliament of the United Kingdom
Preceded by Margaret Bain	Member of Parliament for East Dunbartonshire; 1979–1983	Constituency abolished
New constituency	Member of Parliament for Cumbernauld and Kilsyth; 1983–1997	Succeeded by Rosemary McKenna
Party political offices
Preceded by Walter Harrison	Labour Deputy Chief Whip in the House of Commons; 1983–1987	Succeeded by Don Dixon
