= Gregg McClymont =

Scottish politician

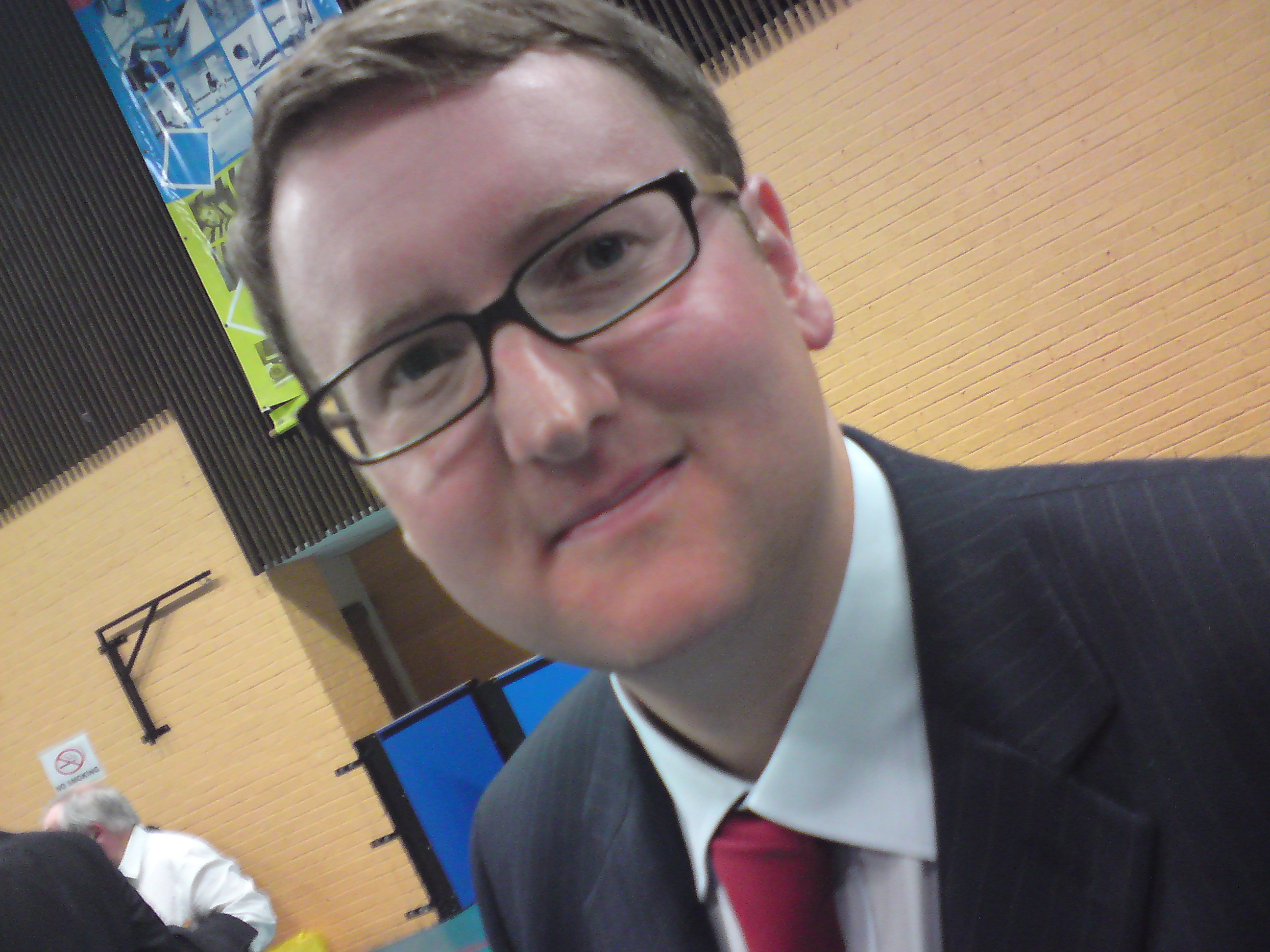
- McClymont in Cumbernauld, May 2010

Shadow Minister for Pensions
- In office 8 October 2011 – 8 May 2015
- Leader: Ed Miliband
- Preceded by: Rachel Reeves
- Succeeded by: Nick Thomas-Symonds

Member of Parliament for Cumbernauld, Kilsyth and Kirkintilloch East
- In office 6 May 2010 – 30 March 2015
- Preceded by: Rosemary McKenna
- Succeeded by: Stuart McDonald
- Majority: 13,755 (34%)

Personal details
- Born: 3 June 1976 (age 50) Cumbernauld, Strathclyde, Scotland
- Party: Labour
- Education: University of Glasgow; University of Pennsylvania; St. John's College, Oxford
- Profession: Historian

Gregg McClymont (born 3 June 1976) is a retirement expert, historian and former politician. He was the Member of Parliament (MP) for Cumbernauld, Kilsyth and Kirkintilloch East from 2010 until 2015.

== Background and personal life ==
Born and brought up in Cumbernauld, he attended Kildrum Primary School and Cumbernauld High School from 1981 until 1993. He read history at the University of Glasgow, graduating in 1997, the year when he was also chair of Scottish Labour Students, before winning the Thouron Scholarship to study at the University of Pennsylvania. Returning to Britain, he wrote a doctoral thesis in modern British history at St John's College, Oxford. Subsequently, he became a tutorial fellow at St Hugh's College, Oxford, where he taught until May 2010.

== Political life ==
He was selected to replace outgoing Labour MP Rosemary McKenna to fight the seat of Cumbernauld, Kilsyth and Kirkintilloch East at the 2010 general election. He won the seat with a 13,755 majority and over 57% of the votes cast. In parliament, McClymont sat on the House of Commons select committees on science and technology, and business, innovation and skills; and held the post of Parliamentary Private Secretary to shadow Secretary of State for Scotland Ann McKechin. In early 2011, he moved on to the Labour front bench as an assistant whip, before becoming the Shadow Pensions Minister for the Department for Work and Pensions in October 2011.

As Shadow Pensions Minister McClymont described proposals to reform annuities as a "good thing", but argued the coalition's plans "lacked clarity". He also claimed that changes to pension credit schemes would see many pensioners getting a rise in pensions of just 87p.

McClymont has been a strong critic of the British Government's economic policy. He has argued repeatedly in parliament for stronger safeguards for post offices following the privatisation of the Royal Mail. He has also sought to highlight the impact changes to housing benefit will have on his constituents in Cumbernauld as well as campaigning for compensation for victims of terror attacks overseas.

== Academic publications ==
- McClymont, Gregg (2008). "Socialism, Puritanism and Hedonism: The Parliamentary Labour Party's Attitude to Gambling, 1923–31". Twentieth Century British History. 19 (3): 288–313. doi:10.1093/tcbh/hwn018.
- McClymong, Gregg (2011). "The Cultural Politics of Tory Socialism: The Clarion in the Labour Movement During the 1890s". In Griffiths, Clare; Nott, James J.; Whyte, William, eds. Classes, Cultures and Politics: Essays on British History for Ross McKibbin. Oxford: Oxford University Press. doi:10.1093/acprof:osobl/9780199579884.001.0001. ISBN 9780199579884.

Parliament of the United Kingdom
| Preceded by Rosemary McKenna | Member of Parliament for Cumbernauld, Kilsyth and Kirkintilloch East; 2010 – 2015 | Succeeded by Stuart McDonald |
