= Cumbernauld and Kilsyth (UK Parliament constituency) =

UK Parliament constituency (1983–2005)

- Former county constituency for the House of Commons
- Boundary of Cumbernauld and Kilsyth in Scotland for the 2001 general election

1983–2005
- Seats: One
- Created from: East Dunbartonshire and West Stirlingshire
- Replaced by: Cumbernauld, Kilsyth & Kirkintilloch East

Cumbernauld and Kilsyth was a county constituency represented in the House of Commons of the Parliament of the United Kingdom from 1983 until 2005, when it was absorbed into the new constituency of Cumbernauld, Kilsyth and Kirkintilloch East as part of a major reorganisation of Scottish constituencies.

The similarly named constituency of Cumbernauld and Kilsyth continues for the Scottish Parliament.

== Members of Parliament ==
Election	Member	Party
1983	Norman Hogg	Labour
1997	Rosemary McKenna	Labour
2005	constituency abolished: see Cumbernauld, Kilsyth & Kirkintilloch East	

== Elections ==
=== Elections of the 1980s ===
General election 1983: Cumbernauld and Kilsyth
Party	Candidate	Votes	%	±%
Labour	Norman Hogg	16,629	49.2	−3.0
SDP	Douglas J. Herbison	6,701	19.8	+17.7
SNP	Gordon Murray	5,875	17.4	−14.2
Conservative	Anne Thomson	4,590	13.6	0.0
Majority		9,928	29.4	
Turnout		33,795	76.5	
Labour win (new seat)				

General election 1987: Cumbernauld and Kilsyth
Party	Candidate	Votes	%	±%
Labour	Norman Hogg	21,385	60.0	+10.8
SNP	Thomas Johnston	6,982	19.6	+2.2
SDP	Colin Deans	5,891	11.4	−8.4
Conservative	Anne Thomson	3,227	9.0	−4.6
Majority		14,403	40.4	+11.0
Turnout		37,485	78.5	+2.0
Labour hold		Swing	+5.0	

=== Elections of the 1990s ===
General election 1992: Cumbernauld and Kilsyth
Party	Candidate	Votes	%	±%
Labour	Norman Hogg	19,855	54.0	−6.0
SNP	Thomas Johnston	10,640	28.9	+9.3
Conservative	Iain Mitchell	4,143	11.3	+2.3
Liberal Democrats	Jean Haddow	2,118	5.8	−5.6
Majority		9,215	25.1	−15.3
Turnout		36,756	79.9	+1.4
Labour hold		Swing		

General election 1997: Cumbernauld and Kilsyth
Party	Candidate	Votes	%	±%
Labour	Rosemary McKenna	21,141	58.7	+4.7
SNP	Colin Barrie	10,013	27.8	−1.1
Conservative	Ian Sewell	2,441	6.8	−4.5
Liberal Democrats	John S. Biggam	1,368	3.8	−2.0
Prolife Alliance	Jan Cara	609	1.7	New
Scottish Socialist	Kenny McEwan	345	1.0	New
Referendum	Pamela Cook	107	0.3	New
Majority		11,128	30.9	+5.8
Turnout		36,024	75.0	−4.9
Labour hold		Swing		

=== Elections of the 2000s ===
General election 2001: Cumbernauld and Kilsyth
Party	Candidate	Votes	%	±%
Labour	Rosemary McKenna	16,144	54.4	−4.3
SNP	David McGlashan	8,624	29.0	+1.2
Liberal Democrats	John O'Donnell	1,934	6.5	+2.7
Conservative	Alison Ross	1,460	4.9	−1.9
Scottish Socialist	Kenny McEwan	1,287	4.3	+3.3
Scottish Freedom Referendum Party	Thomas Taylor	250	0.8	New
Majority		7,520	25.4	−5.5
Turnout		29,699	59.7	−15.3
Labour hold		Swing		
