= 1996 New Zealand Labour Party leadership election =

New Zealand party leadership election

- 27 May 1996

37 New Zealand Labour Party members of the New Zealand Parliament 19 members needed to win
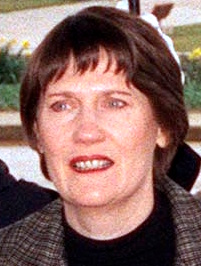

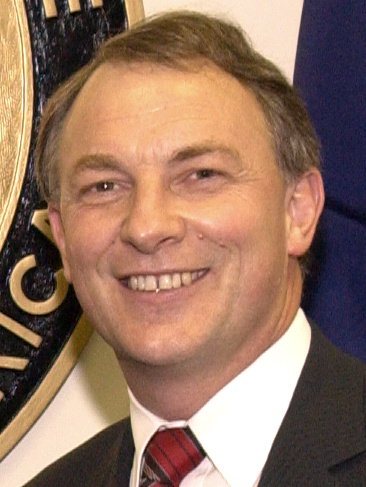
Candidate	Helen Clark	Phil Goff
Leader's seat	Mount Albert	Roskill
Popular vote	Unopposed	Withdrew
Leader before election
Helen Clark
Elected Leader
Helen Clark

The 1996 New Zealand Labour Party leadership election was intended to determine the future leadership of the New Zealand Labour Party. The leadership was retained by Mount Albert MP Helen Clark, who was the incumbent leader.

== Background ==
Despite unseating Mike Moore from the leadership Labour struggled against New Zealand First and the Alliance, after being already behind both National and the Alliance in numerous polls throughout 1995. By early 1996, it still continuously polling poorly, with some showing support below 20%. Labour was still associated with its unpopular Rogernomics image from the 1980s - which Clark was seeking to jettison. This was part of a wider divide inside Labour between its drastically differing left and right factions. Clark was of the left-leaning faction, attempting to restore Labour to it social-democratic roots, while those on the right wing of Labour (such as Goff) were intent on retaining the deregulation and free trade policies of the 1980s, albeit more moderately.

== Candidates ==
=== Helen Clark ===
Clark had led Labour for nearly three years since her own leadership challenge in 1993 against Mike Moore. She proved very unpopular in the country at the time and, at one point, had approval ratings of two percent nationally, but was seen regarded as a colossus within the Labour party itself by Goff and his allies. Clark had yet to connect with voters seeming aloof and wooden. Her widely acknowledged intelligence came across more as arrogance than aptitude.

=== Phil Goff ===
Goff had been a cabinet minister for the entirety of the Fourth Labour Government, actually having more cabinet experience than Clark, who only became a minister in 1987. He was currently serving as the Shadow Minister of Justice under Clark. However, Goff was largely unknown, a dangerous factor only months from an election coupled with his hardline reputation as a Rogernomics-era Minister (something Goff had vigorously supported), an image Labour was trying to shake. This caused many fence sitters to remain with the status-quo, fearing voter backlash.

=== Mike Moore ===
After losing the leadership to Clark, Moore had strongly considered forming a break-away party, the New Zealand Democratic Coalition with Geoff Braybrooke for the new MMP era, but then decided against it. A couple of Maori MPs told Goff's lieutenants they were willing to vote against Clark, but for Moore rather than Goff.

== Result ==
A delegation of Goff and Labour frontbenchers Annette King, Michael Cullen, Jim Sutton and Koro Wētere met with Clark in her office prior to a caucus meeting persuading her to stand down and informing her (in a ruse) that they had the numbers to oust her if she refused. Clark had been prepared for it and had already mobilised her own allies, her deputy David Caygill, Trevor Mallard, Steve Maharey and whip Jonathan Hunt. They had assured her that there were enough MPs loyal to her that the challenge could be averted. Clark stared Goff and his supporters down and ultimately remained leader.

Over the period Caygill had been privately contemplating retiring from politics. On 7 June he informed Clark of his decision to stand down. On 11 June Caygill announced his retirement to a surprised caucus where Cullen was elected the new deputy leader unopposed. Only a day earlier the five frontbench MPs who had confronted Clark had said they wouldn't push for a leadership vote. Caygill said there had been no pressure on him to quit and hoped it would provide the "circuit-breaker" to Labour's troubles. Moore, who still held leadership ambitions, refused to comment on the positional change, saying only that he did not contest the deputy leadership because he was "a leader, not a deputy".

== Outcome ==
Clark would lead Labour until she resigned in 2008. Clark was advised by her allies to demote Goff, but she chose not to. As feared, Labour lost the 1996 election, but did better than many earlier polls indicated. Clark would go on to win three consecutively (Labour's best showing since their first government) in 1999, 2002 and 2005. Goff would eventually become leader in 2008 when Clark resigned following that year's election.

As Goff had hosted a barbeque for his colleagues during the planning stage of the leadership challenge the term "BBQ" became a code word in New Zealand from then on for leadership coups.
