= Ethics and Integrity Commission =

Agency overview
- Formed: 13 October 2025
- Preceding agency: Committee on Standards in Public Life (1994–2025)
- Headquarters: London, England; 51.5015°N 0.1259°W
- Agency executives: Chair; Doug Chalmers
- Parent department: Cabinet Office
- Website: https://eic.independent-commission.uk/

The Ethics and Integrity Commission is an advisory non-departmental public body in the United Kingdom. It is sponsored by the Cabinet Office and succeeded the Committee on Standards in Public Life (CSPL) on 13 October 2025.

== Background ==
On 21 July 2025, the Starmer government announced plans for a new body to oversee the ethical standards of ministers and public officials, called the Ethics and Integrity Commission. The Labour Party had committed to creating this body in their 2024 manifesto.

The Ethics and Integrity Commission replaced the Committee on Standards in Public Life (CSPL).
