= 2008 New Zealand Labour Party leadership election =

New Zealand party leadership election

- 11 November 2008
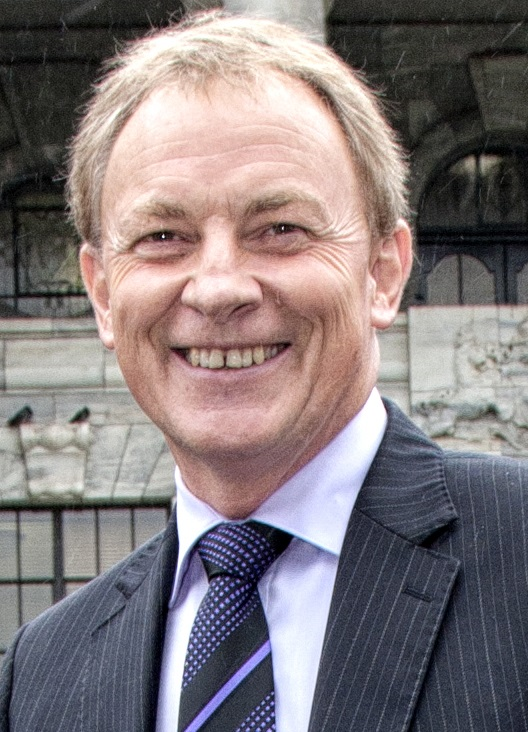
Candidate	Phil Goff
Leader's seat	Mount Roskill
Popular vote	Unopposed
Leader before election
Helen Clark
Elected Leader
Phil Goff

The 2008 New Zealand Labour Party leadership election was held on 11 November 2008 to choose the twelfth Leader of the New Zealand Labour Party. Phil Goff, who had served continuously as an MP since the 1993 election, unanimously won the election with no other MPs putting themselves forward. Annette King became the Deputy Leader. She was first elected to parliament in the 1984 election, three years after Goff.

== Background ==
Following the Labour government's defeat in the 2008 general election, Prime Minister Helen Clark resigned after 15 years as party leader, including three terms as prime minister, prompting the leadership election.

== Candidates ==
There was only one candidate, Phil Goff.

=== Phil Goff ===
Phil Goff had been an MP since 1981 except for three years after losing his seat in 1990. He had served in Clark's government concurrently as Minister of Foreign Affairs and Minister of Justice and later as Minister of Defence. He had previously served in various capacities in David Lange's cabinet in the 1980s. Goff and Clark did not always see eye to eye and in 1996 he attempted an abortive coup to oust Clark.

== Outcome and aftermath ==
Goff had been widely tipped as Clark's successor and faced no other candidates and was acclaimed with unanimous support on 11 November 2008. Annette King was elected as deputy leader, and Darren Hughes and Steve Chadwick were elected as the senior and junior whips, respectively.

Both Goff and King were also perceived by many as merely caretaker leaders until newer, younger figures could emerge. After initially performing well in the opinion polls, Goff's Labour Party dropped in support in contrast to the popular National government led by John Key, hitting a 10 year low of 27% support in July 2011 after controversy over Labour's proposal for a capital gains tax hurt the party's support. While party support recovered somewhat, Goff still led Labour to defeat in the 26 November 2011 general election with a loss of 8 seats and 6.5% of the popular vote compared to 2008. On 29 November, Goff and King tendered their resignations to a meeting of caucus, effective 13 December 2011.
