= Scottish Labour Students =

Student society affiliated to Scottish Labour

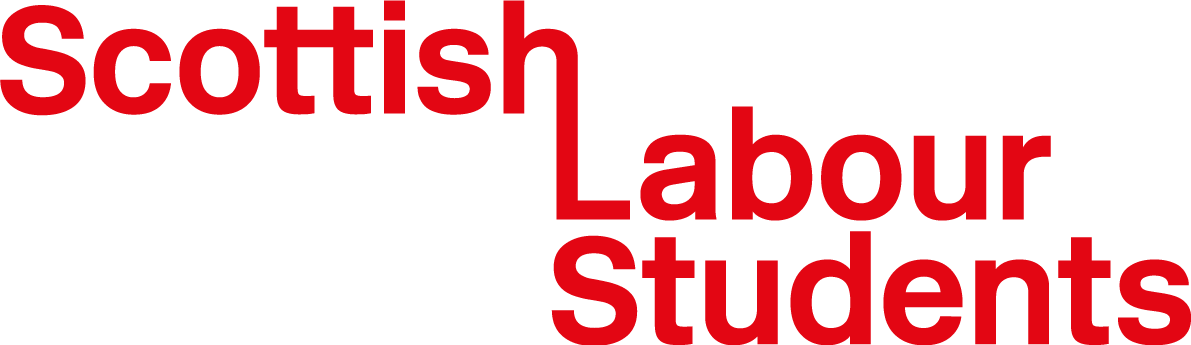
- Chair: Finn McGrady Strachan
- Vice Chair: Evie Cray
- General Secretary: Xavier Cottrell-Boyce
- Treasurer: James Farrow
- Founded: 1970
- Preceded by: Scottish Association of Labour Student Organisations
- Colours: Red
- Mother party: Scottish Labour, Labour Party (UK)

Scottish Labour Students (SLS) is a student society affiliated to Scottish Labour, and part of the UK wide organisation Labour Students.

It aims to bring Labour values to campuses and represent students within the Labour Party throughout Scotland. SLS hold regular Scottish events including SLS Conference in November and SLS Council in February. In addition, its members are often invited to hear major speakers at Labour Party events throughout the year. Glasgow University Labour Club and Edinburgh Labour Students are the two biggest clubs within SLS, and the newest club is the University of the West of Scotland Labour Students.

== History ==
The organisation was founded as the Organisation of Labour Students (SOLS) in 1970/1971, however it is a direct descendant of the Scottish Association of Labour Student Organisations (SALSO) which had existed since 1946. In the 1960s SALSO's UK equivalent, the National Association of Labour Student Organisations (NALSO), was taken over by Trotskyists and disaffiliated from the Labour Party. SALSO, however, successfully resisted any take-over attempts.

SOLS remained famous for its hostility to Trotskyism and its members were key to recovering control of the National Organisation of Labour Students, NOLS, from the Militant tendency in 1975 and the following year SOLS members took the famous "icepick express" (a bus with an icepick - the weapon used to kill Leon Trotsky - attached to the front) to that year's NOLS conference at Lancaster University. This incident is recalled in some detail in Michael Crick's book on the Militant tendency. (see Clause Four Group.)

In 2023, Scottish Conference voted unanimously to re-affiliated SLS after a campaign by incumbent Chair Solomon Cuthbertson.

== Internal organisation ==
SLS is made up of affiliated Labour Clubs at universities across Scotland:

- Glasgow University Labour Club
- Edinburgh University Labour Students
  (Also includes members of Edinburgh Napier University, Heriot-Watt University, and Queen Margaret University)
- Strathclyde University Labour Club
- Stirling University Labour Society
- St Andrews University Labour Society
- Dundee University Labour Students
- Aberdeen Uni Labour Students
- University of the West of Scotland Labour Students
- University of the Highlands and Islands Labour Students

SLS has an executive committee, elected on a yearly basis, currently including:

- Chair: Emma Russell
- Vice Chair: Marcus Flucker
- Secretary: Ceara Sidney
- Treasurer: James Farrow
- Women's Officer: Olivia Clarke
- Disabled Students' Officer: Ruaridh Bennett
- BAME Officer: Ben Amir Stewart
- LGBT+ Officer: VACANT
- Trans Officer: VACANT
- Ordinary Rep (Postgraduate): Nina Miller
- Ordinary Rep (International): Julia Pancer
- Ordinary Rep: Finn McGrady Strachan
- Ordinary Rep: Maya Pons

All positions are elected at the annual SLS Conference held at the conclusion of each academic year.

== Liberation groups ==
The SLS committee includes representatives from each of the 4 liberation campaigns recognised by Labour Students: Women's, LGBT+, Disabled Students and Black Minority Ethnic. Each campaign is autonomous and hold events and discussions designed at highlighting issues relevant to them to the wider Labour Students movement.

== Campaigning ==
SLS members are involved in election campaigning in Scotland and across the UK, and the organisation mobilises its members to take part in campaigns in marginal seats across the country.

In addition to this, for the first time in 2007/08 SLS ran its own issue-based priority campaign. 'Changing Perceptions - Homelessness' intended to challenge the perception young people have of the homeless in Scotland.

In 2008 SLS ran a pro-choice lobbying campaign against attempts during the passage of the Human Fertilisation and Embryology Bill by Conservative Party MP Nadine Dorries to reduce the upper limit for abortions to 20 weeks from the current 24 weeks of pregnancy. Her amendment was defeated by 332 votes to 190, with a separate 22-week limit opposed by 304 votes to 233 - with MPs continuing to support the 24-week limit.

SLS are also actively involved in opposing the Scottish National Party plans to introduce a Local Income Tax which SLS claim would hit students who have to work to support themselves while studying.

As of 2014 SLS officially supports the return of the post-study work visa and free education.

As of 2019, the SLS officially supports further unionisation of workers in students' unions across Scotland.

In the 2021 Scottish Labour leadership election, SLS officially endorsed the Campaign for Socialism-backed candidate, Monica Lennon, who subsequently lost to Anas Sarwar by a margin of 58 to 42 per cent.

== List of Chairs ==
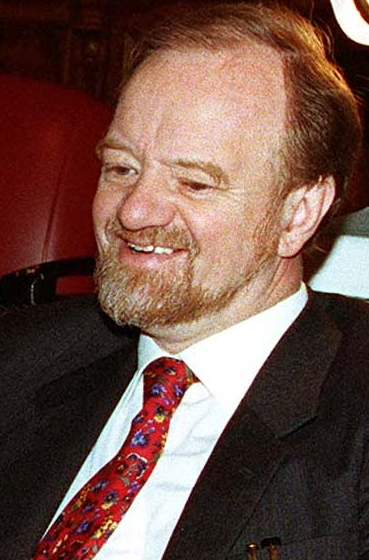
Robin Cook in 1997

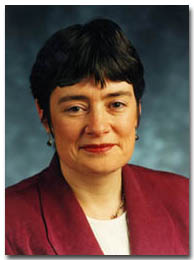
Sarah Boyack in 1999

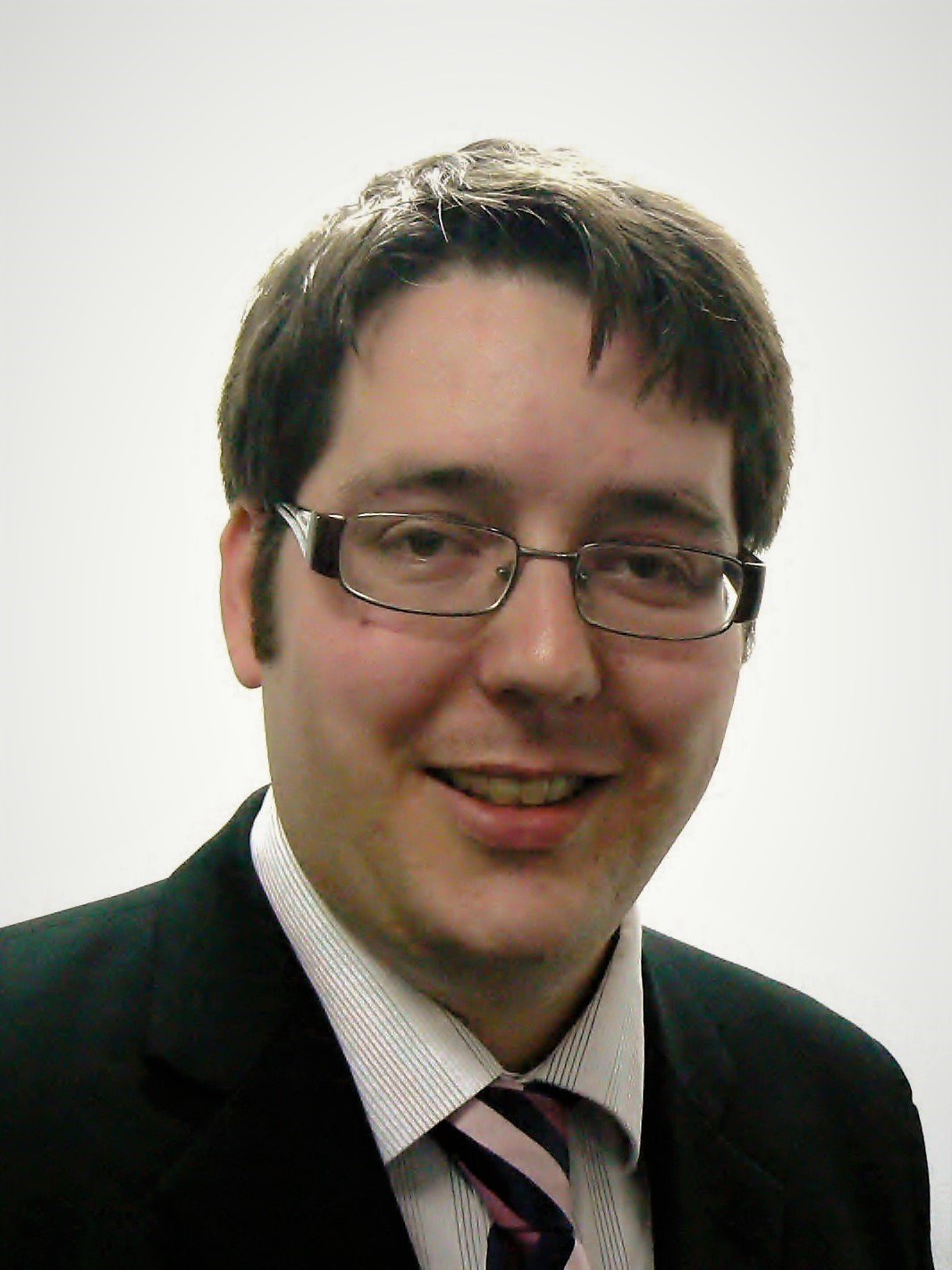
Neil Bibby in 2011

Term	Chair
1967	Robin Cook
1976	Robin Wales
1978	David Smith
1979	Margaret Curran
1980	John Boothman
1981	Geoff Norris
1982	Paul Robertson
1984	Sarah Boyack
1985	Susan Deacon
1986	Pat McFadden
1987	Paul Greatrix
1988	Billy Halliday
1992	Jason Wassell
1994	Joanne Milligan
1997	Gregg McClymont
1998	Alex Foulkes
2001	Blair McDougall
2002	Blair McDougall*
2002	Gemma Doyle and John Woodcock
2003	Adam Hug
2004	Neil Bibby
2005	Kenny Young
2006	Kenny Young
2007	Victoria Jamieson
2008	Jillian Merchant
2009	Dean Carlin
2010	Ross MacRae
2011	Ross MacRae
2011	Mary Roberts
2012	Lewis Miller
2013	Stephen Donnelly
2014	Oliver Milne
2015	Erin Mulhatton
2016	Pippa Weaver
2017	Kate Shaw Nelson
2018	Kirsten Muat
2019	Andrew Wilson (resigned mid-term after majority of University Labour Clubs voted no confidence in leadership)
2019	Mariam Shaaban (elected following Andrew Wilson's resignation)
2020	Mariam Shaaban (resigned mid-term)
2020	Lottie Doherty (Interim Chair)
2021	Daniel Deery
2022	Solomon Cuthbertson
2024	Emma Russell
2026	Finn McGrady-Strachan

Note: Blair McDougall served two terms because the Youth and Student Conference was cancelled following the death of Scotland's First Minister, Donald Dewar.
