= Rosemary McKenna =

British politician

Rosemary McKenna CBE
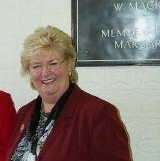

Member of Parliament for Cumbernauld, Kilsyth and Kirkintilloch East Cumbernauld and Kilsyth (1997–2005)
- In office 1 May 1997 – 12 April 2010
- Preceded by: Norman Hogg
- Succeeded by: Gregg McClymont

Personal details
- Born: 8 May 1941 (age 84) Renfrewshire, Scotland
- Party: Labour
- Spouse: James McKenna
- Children: 4

Rosemary McKenna CBE (née Harvey; born 8 May 1941) is a Scottish Labour Party politician, who sat in the House of Commons of the United Kingdom from 1997 to 2010. She was elected as the member of parliament (MP) for Cumbernauld and Kilsyth at the 1997 general election, and held that seat until its abolition in boundary changes for the 2005 general election. She was then elected as the MP for the new Cumbernauld, Kilsyth and Kirkintilloch East, from which she stood down at the next election, in 2010.

== Early life ==
Born to the Irish Cornelius Harvey and a Scottish mother, Susan, she went to St Augustine's RC Secondary School on Liddesdale Road in Milton, Glasgow. From 1958 to 1965, she worked as a secretary. She joined the Labour Party in 1966 when she moved to Cumbernauld. She studied at the Roman Catholic Notre Dame College of Education, receiving a Diploma in Primary Education in 1974. She was a primary school teacher from 1974 to 1994 before becoming a local councillor and eventual Provost of the former Cumbernauld and Kilsyth District Council.

== Parliamentary career ==
McKenna was first elected in 1997 to represent the former Cumbernauld and Kilsyth seat, which she retained at the 2001 election.

The seat was abolished for the 2005 general election and she contested the new Cumbernauld, Kilsyth and Kirkintilloch East constituency, winning with a 1.1% swing against her to the Scottish National Party. She retired at the 2010 general election.

In 2006, she gave the loyal address following the Queens Speech alongside Alun Michael.

She was responsible for chairing the Labour Party's vetting procedure for candidates for the first election for the Scottish Parliament. This process saw many of the more left-oriented candidates rejected, including Dennis Canavan, Ian Davidson, Michael Connarty, all of whom were sitting Members of Parliament at the time, as well as Tommy Sheppard, a former Assistant General Secretary of the Labour Party in Scotland.

== Personal life ==
She married James McKenna. They have three sons and one daughter.

Parliament of the United Kingdom
Preceded by Norman Hogg	Member of Parliament for Cumbernauld and Kilsyth; 1997–2005	constituency abolished
New constituency	Member of Parliament for Cumbernauld, Kilsyth and Kirkintilloch East; 2005–2010	Succeeded by Gregg McClymont
