= 1994 Labour Party deputy leadership election =

- 30 June – 21 July 1994
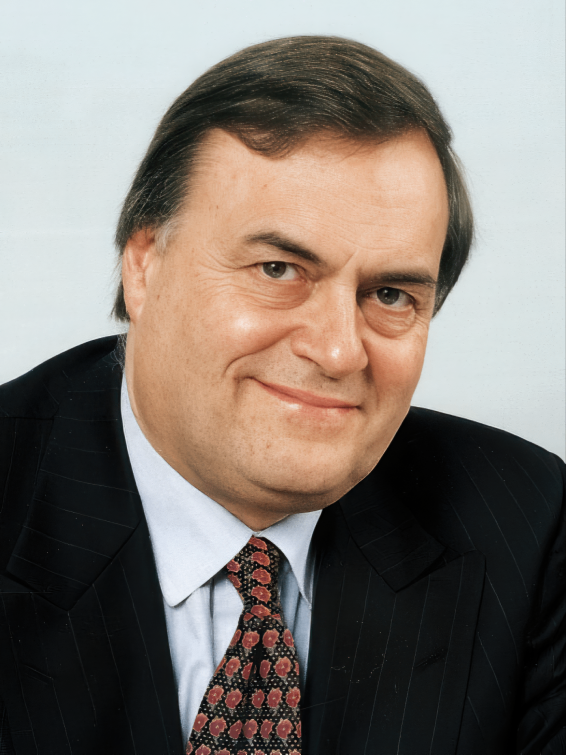

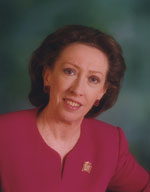
Candidate	John Prescott	Margaret Beckett
Overall result	56.5%	43.5%
Affiliated unions	56.6%	43.4%
Party members	59.5%	40.5%
MPs & MEPs	53.8%	46.2%
Deputy Leader before election
Margaret Beckett
Elected Deputy Leader
John Prescott

A deputy leadership election for the Labour Party in the United Kingdom took place in 1994, following the sudden death of incumbent leader John Smith. Margaret Beckett was the serving Deputy Leader of the Labour Party, having been elected in 1992, and following Smith's death became the acting leader. On 25 May she announced that a contest for the deputy leadership would take place alongside the leadership election, which allowed her to stand for both positions.

Nominations opened on 10 June and ballot papers were sent out on 30 June. Elections were held concurrently for both Leader and Deputy Leader of the Party, with the results announced on 21 July 1994. There were three candidates for Leader: Margaret Beckett, Tony Blair and John Prescott, but out of these three, only Blair did not simultaneously stand for Deputy Leader and did not endorse either Beckett or Prescott for Deputy. Blair went on to win the leadership election, and Prescott won the deputy leadership. Both Prescott and Beckett held roles in Blair's cabinet for his entire time in office.

== Candidates ==
- Margaret Beckett, incumbent Deputy Leader of the Labour Party, Member of Parliament for Derby South
- John Prescott, Shadow Secretary of State for Employment, Member of Parliament for Kingston upon Hull East

== Result ==
The election was conducted using the Labour Party's new "electoral college" which gave a third of the votes to the party's MPs and MEPs, a third to its rank and file members (the CLP) and the final third to affiliated trade unions and societies, such as the Fabians.

Candidate	Affiliated (33.3%)		Constituencies (33.3%)		PLP (33.3%)		Overall result
Candidate	Votes	%	Votes	%	Votes	%	%
John Prescott ✓	441,155	56.6	102,379	59.5	176	53.8	56.5
Margaret Beckett	338,271	43.4	69,977	40.5	151	46.2	43.5

== How each MP voted ==
MP	Leader vote	Deputy Leader vote
Diane Abbott	Margaret Beckett	Margaret Beckett
Irene Adams	John Prescott	John Prescott
Nick Ainger	Tony Blair	John Prescott
Bob Ainsworth	Tony Blair	John Prescott
Graham Allen	Tony Blair	Margaret Beckett
Donald Anderson	Tony Blair	Margaret Beckett
Janet Anderson	Tony Blair	John Prescott
Hilary Armstrong	Tony Blair	Margaret Beckett
Joe Ashton	Tony Blair	John Prescott
John Austin-Walker	Margaret Beckett	Margaret Beckett
Tony Banks	Margaret Beckett	Margaret Beckett
Harry Barnes	Margaret Beckett	Margaret Beckett
Kevin Barron	Tony Blair	John Prescott
John Battle	Margaret Beckett	Margaret Beckett
Hugh Bayley	Tony Blair	John Prescott
Margaret Beckett	Margaret Beckett	Margaret Beckett
Stuart Bell	Tony Blair	Margaret Beckett
Tony Benn	John Prescott	Margaret Beckett
Andrew Bennett	John Prescott	John Prescott
Joe Benton	Tony Blair	John Prescott
Gerry Bermingham	Tony Blair	John Prescott
Roger Berry	John Prescott	Margaret Beckett
Clive Betts	Tony Blair	Margaret Beckett
Tony Blair	Tony Blair	None
David Blunkett	Tony Blair	John Prescott
Paul Boateng	Tony Blair	Margaret Beckett
Roland Boyes	Margaret Beckett	Margaret Beckett
Keith Bradley	Tony Blair	John Prescott
Jeremy Bray	Tony Blair	John Prescott
Gordon Brown	Tony Blair	Margaret Beckett
Nick Brown	Margaret Beckett	Margaret Beckett
Richard Burden	Tony Blair	John Prescott
Stephen Byers	Tony Blair	Margaret Beckett
Richard Caborn	John Prescott	John Prescott
Jim Callaghan	Tony Blair	John Prescott
Anne Campbell	Tony Blair	Margaret Beckett
Ronnie Campbell	John Prescott	Margaret Beckett
Dale Campbell-Savours	Tony Blair	Margaret Beckett
Dennis Canavan	Margaret Beckett	Margaret Beckett
Jamie Cann	Tony Blair	John Prescott
Malcolm Chisholm	Margaret Beckett	Margaret Beckett
Judith Church	Tony Blair	Margaret Beckett
Michael Clapham	John Prescott	Margaret Beckett
David Clark	Tony Blair	Margaret Beckett
Eric Clarke	John Prescott	John Prescott
Tom Clarke	Tony Blair	Margaret Beckett
David Clelland	Tony Blair	Margaret Beckett
Ann Clwyd	Tony Blair	John Prescott
Ann Coffey	Tony Blair	John Prescott
Harry Cohen	Margaret Beckett	Margaret Beckett
Michael Connarty	Tony Blair	John Prescott
Robin Cook	Tony Blair	John Prescott
Frank Cook	John Prescott	John Prescott
Robin Corbett	Tony Blair	John Prescott
Jeremy Corbyn	Margaret Beckett	Margaret Beckett
Jean Corston	Margaret Beckett	Margaret Beckett
Jim Cousins	Margaret Beckett	Margaret Beckett
Tom Cox	Tony Blair	Margaret Beckett
John Cummings	Tony Blair	John Prescott
Lawrence Cunliffe	Tony Blair	John Prescott
Jack Cunningham	Tony Blair	Margaret Beckett
Jim Cunningham	Tony Blair	John Prescott
Tam Dalyell	John Prescott	John Prescott
Alistair Darling	Tony Blair	Margaret Beckett
Ian Davidson	John Prescott	John Prescott
Bryan Davies	Tony Blair	John Prescott
Denzil Davies	John Prescott	Margaret Beckett
Ron Davies	Tony Blair	John Prescott
Terry Davis	John Prescott	John Prescott
John Denham	Tony Blair	Margaret Beckett
Donald Dewar	Tony Blair	Margaret Beckett
Don Dixon	John Prescott	John Prescott
Frank Dobson	Tony Blair	Margaret Beckett
Brian Donohoe	John Prescott	John Prescott
Jim Dowd	Tony Blair	John Prescott
Jimmy Dunnachie	Tony Blair	John Prescott
Gwyneth Dunwoody	John Prescott	John Prescott
Angela Eagle	Margaret Beckett	Margaret Beckett
Ken Eastham	John Prescott	John Prescott
Derek Enright	Tony Blair	John Prescott
Bill Etherington	John Prescott	John Prescott
John Evans	Tony Blair	John Prescott
Derek Fatchett	Margaret Beckett	Margaret Beckett
Andrew Faulds	Tony Blair	John Prescott
Frank Field	Tony Blair	John Prescott
Mark Fisher	Tony Blair	John Prescott
Paul Flynn	Tony Blair	Margaret Beckett
Derek Foster	Tony Blair	Margaret Beckett
George Foulkes	Tony Blair	John Prescott
John Fraser	Tony Blair	Margaret Beckett
Maria Fyfe	Margaret Beckett	Margaret Beckett
Sam Galbraith	Tony Blair	Margaret Beckett
George Galloway	None	None
Mike Gapes	Tony Blair	Margaret Beckett
John Garrett	Tony Blair	Margaret Beckett
Bruce George	Tony Blair	John Prescott
Neil Gerrard	Margaret Beckett	Margaret Beckett
John Gilbert	Tony Blair	John Prescott
Norman Godman	John Prescott	John Prescott
Roger Godsiff	None	None
Llin Golding	Margaret Beckett	Margaret Beckett
Mildred Gordon	Margaret Beckett	Margaret Beckett
Tommy Graham	John Prescott	John Prescott
Bernie Grant	Margaret Beckett	Margaret Beckett
Nigel Griffiths	Tony Blair	Margaret Beckett
Win Griffiths	Tony Blair	Margaret Beckett
Bruce Grocott	Tony Blair	John Prescott
John Gunnell	Tony Blair	John Prescott
Peter Hain	Margaret Beckett	John Prescott
Mike Hall	John Prescott	John Prescott
David Hanson	Tony Blair	John Prescott
Peter Hardy	Tony Blair	Margaret Beckett
Harriet Harman	Tony Blair	Margaret Beckett
Roy Hattersley	Tony Blair	John Prescott
Doug Henderson	Tony Blair	Margaret Beckett
John Heppell	Margaret Beckett	Margaret Beckett
Keith Hill	Tony Blair	Margaret Beckett
David Hinchliffe	John Prescott	John Prescott
Margaret Hodge	Tony Blair	Margaret Beckett
Kate Hoey	Tony Blair	Margaret Beckett
Norman Hogg	Tony Blair	Margaret Beckett
Jimmy Hood	John Prescott	John Prescott
Geoff Hoon	Tony Blair	Margaret Beckett
George Howarth	Tony Blair	Margaret Beckett
Kim Howells	Tony Blair	Margaret Beckett
Doug Hoyle	John Prescott	John Prescott
Bob Hughes	John Prescott	John Prescott
Kevin Hughes	Tony Blair	John Prescott
Roy Hughes	Tony Blair	John Prescott
John Hutton	Tony Blair	Margaret Beckett
Eric Illsley	John Prescott	John Prescott
Adam Ingram	Tony Blair	Margaret Beckett
Glenda Jackson	Tony Blair	Margaret Beckett
Helen Jackson	Margaret Beckett	Margaret Beckett
David Jamieson	Tony Blair	Margaret Beckett
Greville Janner	Tony Blair	John Prescott
Barry Jones	Tony Blair	Margaret Beckett
Jon Owen Jones	Tony Blair	John Prescott
Lynne Jones	Margaret Beckett	Margaret Beckett
Martyn Jones	John Prescott	John Prescott
Tessa Jowell	Tony Blair	Margaret Beckett
Gerald Kaufman	Tony Blair	John Prescott
Alan Keen	Tony Blair	Margaret Beckett
Jane Kennedy	Tony Blair	John Prescott
Piara Khabra	Tony Blair	John Prescott
Peter Kilfoyle	Tony Blair	John Prescott
Neil Kinnock	Tony Blair	Margaret Beckett
Joan Lestor	John Prescott	John Prescott
Terry Lewis	Margaret Beckett	John Prescott
Helen Liddell	Tony Blair	John Prescott
Bob Litherland	John Prescott	John Prescott
Ken Livingstone	Margaret Beckett	Margaret Beckett
Tony Lloyd	John Prescott	John Prescott
Geoffrey Lofthouse	Tony Blair	John Prescott
Eddie Loyden	Margaret Beckett	Margaret Beckett
Calum MacDonald	Tony Blair	John Prescott
Andrew Mackinlay	Margaret Beckett	John Prescott
Max Madden	Margaret Beckett	Margaret Beckett
Alice Mahon	Margaret Beckett	Margaret Beckett
Peter Mandelson	Tony Blair	John Prescott
John Marek	Margaret Beckett	Margaret Beckett
David Marshall	John Prescott	Margaret Beckett
Jim Marshall	Margaret Beckett	Margaret Beckett
Michael Martin	Tony Blair	John Prescott
Eric Martlew	Tony Blair	John Prescott
John Maxton	Tony Blair	Margaret Beckett
John McAllion	John Prescott	John Prescott
Tommy McAvoy	Tony Blair	John Prescott
Ian McCartney	John Prescott	John Prescott
John McFall	Tony Blair	John Prescott
Willie McKelvey	John Prescott	John Prescott
Henry McLeish	Tony Blair	Margaret Beckett
Gordon McMaster	John Prescott	John Prescott
Kevin McNamara	Tony Blair	Margaret Beckett
Denis MacShane	Tony Blair	John Prescott
John McWilliam	Tony Blair	Margaret Beckett
Michael Meacher	John Prescott	John Prescott
Alan Meale	John Prescott	John Prescott
Alun Michael	Tony Blair	Margaret Beckett
Bill Michie	Margaret Beckett	Margaret Beckett
Alan Milburn	Tony Blair	Margaret Beckett
Andrew Miller	Tony Blair	John Prescott
Austin Mitchell	Tony Blair	John Prescott
Lewis Moonie	Tony Blair	Margaret Beckett
Rhodri Morgan	Tony Blair	John Prescott
Elliot Morley	Tony Blair	John Prescott
Alf Morris	Tony Blair	Margaret Beckett
Estelle Morris	Tony Blair	John Prescott
John Morris	Tony Blair	John Prescott
Mo Mowlam	Tony Blair	John Prescott
George Mudie	Tony Blair	John Prescott
Chris Mullin	Tony Blair	Margaret Beckett
Paul Murphy	Tony Blair	John Prescott
Mike O'Brien	Tony Blair	John Prescott
Bill O'Brien	Tony Blair	John Prescott
Eddie O'Hara	Tony Blair	John Prescott
Martin O'Neill	Tony Blair	John Prescott
Gordon Oakes	Tony Blair	Margaret Beckett
Bill Olner	Tony Blair	John Prescott
Stan Orme	Tony Blair	John Prescott
Bob Parry	John Prescott	John Prescott
Terry Patchett	John Prescott	Spoilt
Tom Pendry	Tony Blair	John Prescott
Colin Pickthall	John Prescott	John Prescott
Peter Pike	Margaret Beckett	Margaret Beckett
Greg Pope	Tony Blair	John Prescott
Ray Powell	John Prescott	John Prescott
Bridget Prentice	Tony Blair	John Prescott
Gordon Prentice	Margaret Beckett	Margaret Beckett
John Prescott	John Prescott	John Prescott
Dawn Primarolo	Margaret Beckett	Margaret Beckett
Ken Purchase	Margaret Beckett	Margaret Beckett
Joyce Quin	Tony Blair	Margaret Beckett
Giles Radice	Tony Blair	Margaret Beckett
Stuart Randall	Tony Blair	Margaret Beckett
Nick Raynsford	Tony Blair	Margaret Beckett
Martin Redmond	John Prescott	John Prescott
John Reid	Tony Blair	John Prescott
George Robertson	Tony Blair	Margaret Beckett
John Home Robertson	Tony Blair	John Prescott
Geoffrey Robinson	Tony Blair	John Prescott
Barbara Roche	Margaret Beckett	Margaret Beckett
Allan Rogers	Tony Blair	John Prescott
Jeff Rooker	Tony Blair	John Prescott
Terry Rooney	Margaret Beckett	John Prescott
Ernie Ross	Tony Blair	John Prescott
Ted Rowlands	Tony Blair	John Prescott
Joan Ruddock	Tony Blair	Margaret Beckett
Brian Sedgemore	Margaret Beckett	John Prescott
Barry Sheerman	Tony Blair	Margaret Beckett
Robert Sheldon	Tony Blair	John Prescott
Peter Shore	Tony Blair	John Prescott
Clare Short	Margaret Beckett	Margaret Beckett
Alan Simpson	Margaret Beckett	Margaret Beckett
Dennis Skinner	Margaret Beckett	Margaret Beckett
Andrew Smith	Tony Blair	Margaret Beckett
Chris Smith	Tony Blair	Margaret Beckett
Llew Smith	John Prescott	Margaret Beckett
Peter Snape	John Prescott	John Prescott
Clive Soley	Tony Blair	John Prescott
Nigel Spearing	Margaret Beckett	Margaret Beckett
John Spellar	Tony Blair	John Prescott
Rachel Squire	Tony Blair	Margaret Beckett
Gerry Steinberg	Tony Blair	John Prescott
George Stevenson	Margaret Beckett	Margaret Beckett
Roger Stott	Tony Blair	John Prescott
Gavin Strang	Tony Blair	Margaret Beckett
Jack Straw	Tony Blair	None
Gerry Sutcliffe	Tony Blair	John Prescott
Ann Taylor	Tony Blair	Margaret Beckett
Jack Thompson	Tony Blair	John Prescott
Stephen Timms	Tony Blair	Margaret Beckett
Paddy Tipping	Margaret Beckett	Margaret Beckett
Dennis Turner	Tony Blair	Margaret Beckett
Keith Vaz	Tony Blair	Margaret Beckett
Harold Walker	Tony Blair	John Prescott
Joan Walley	John Prescott	John Prescott
Gareth Wardell	None	None
Bob Wareing	John Prescott	John Prescott
Mike Watson	Tony Blair	John Prescott
Malcolm Wicks	Tony Blair	John Prescott
Alan J. Williams	Tony Blair	John Prescott
Alan W. Williams	Tony Blair	Margaret Beckett
Brian Wilson	Tony Blair	John Prescott
David Winnick	John Prescott	Margaret Beckett
Audrey Wise	Margaret Beckett	Margaret Beckett
Tony Worthington	Tony Blair	John Prescott
Jimmy Wray	John Prescott	John Prescott
Tony Wright	Tony Blair	John Prescott
David Young	John Prescott	John Prescott

== See also ==
- 1994 Labour Party leadership election
