= 1992 Labour Party leadership election =

British leadership election to replace Neil Kinnock

- 18 July 1992
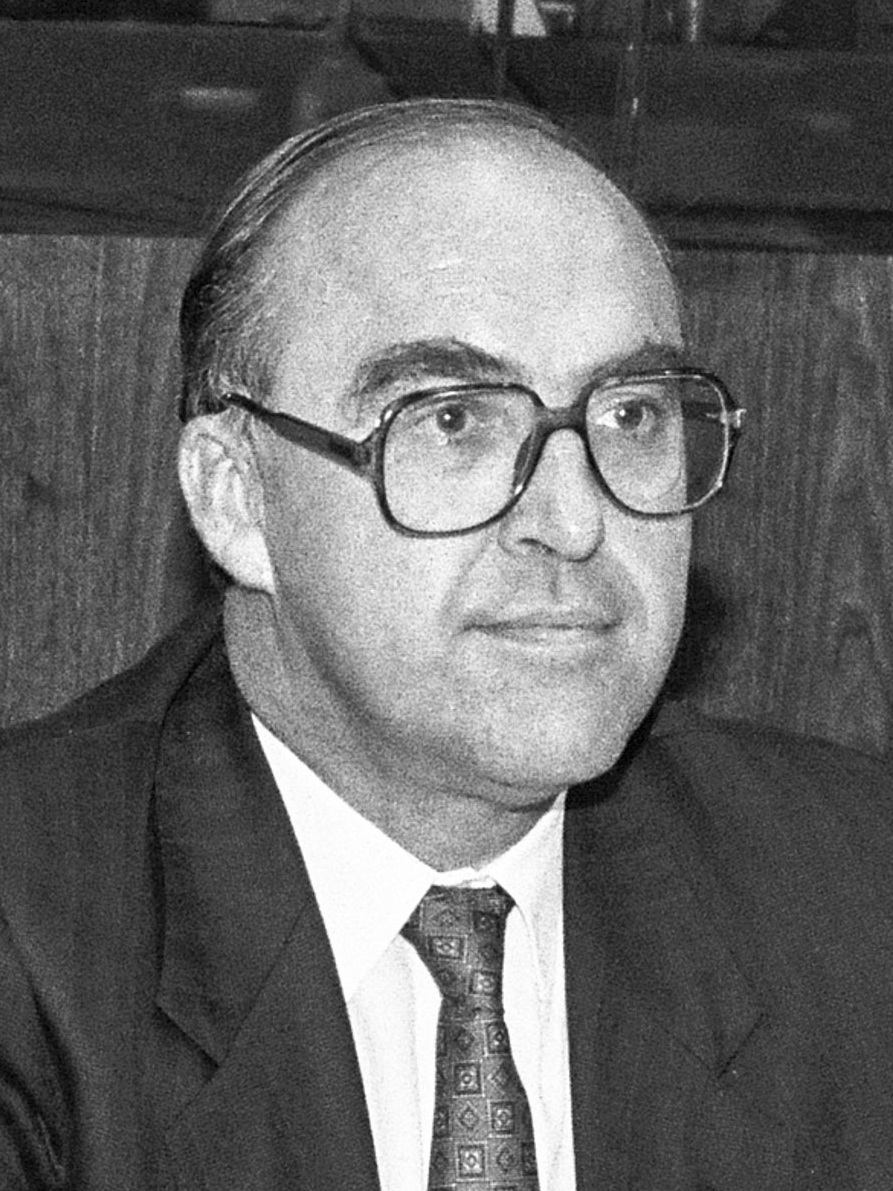

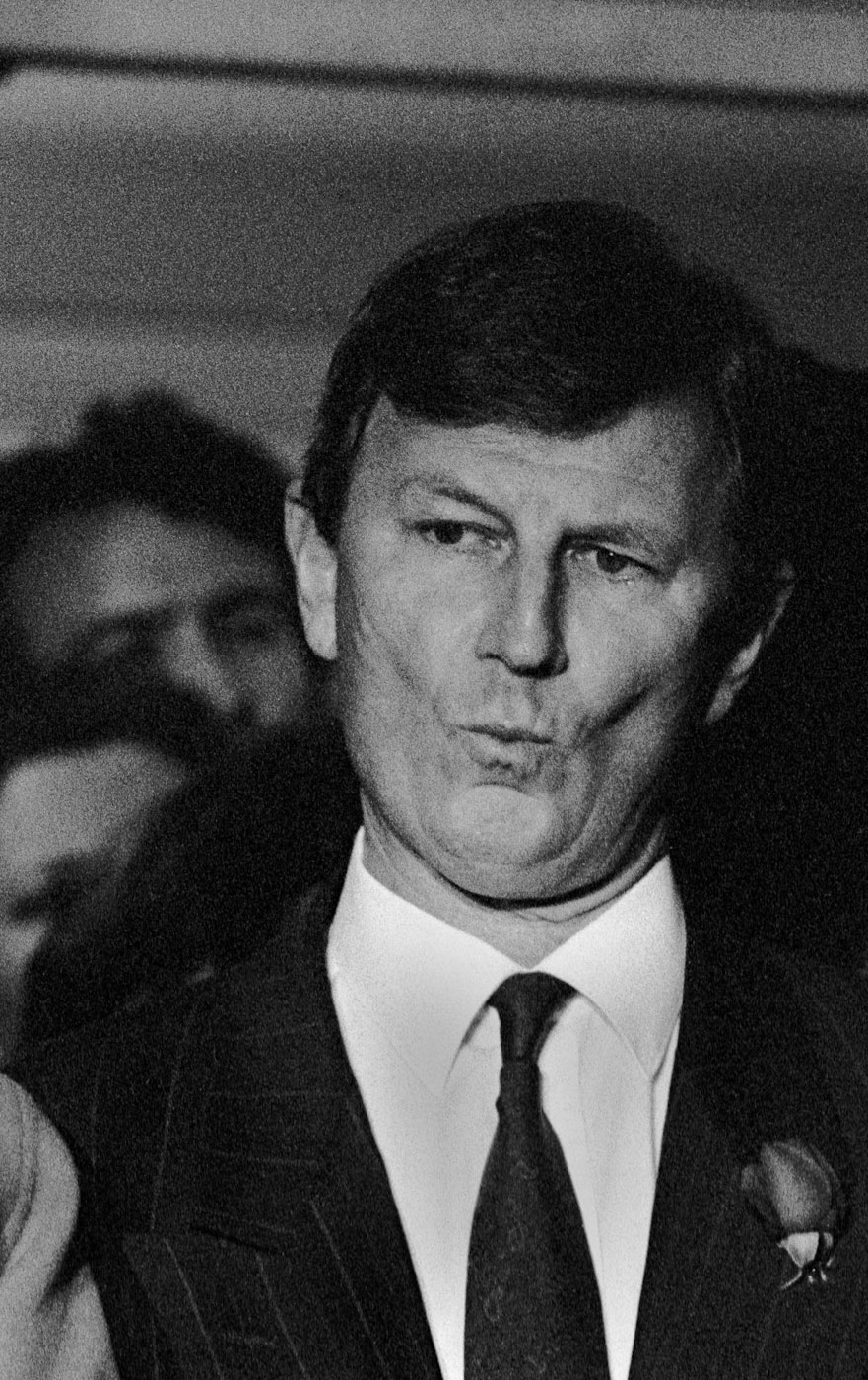
Candidate	John Smith	Bryan Gould
Overall result	91.0%	9.0%
Affiliated unions	96.3%	3.7%
Party members	98.0%	2.0%
Labour MPs	77.1%	22.9%
Leader before election
Neil Kinnock
Elected Leader
John Smith

The 1992 Labour Party leadership election followed the Labour Party's failure to win the 1992 general election and the subsequent resignation of party leader Neil Kinnock.

There were only two candidates in the election, with John Smith always the clear favourite to win. The ballot took place on 18 July 1992 at the Labour Party conference. Affiliated organisations had 40% of the vote, while Constituency Labour Parties and the Parliamentary Labour Party had 30% each in the electoral college. Gordon Brown and Robin Cook were both seen as potential candidates, but did not stand.

John Smith was elected in a landslide victory with 91% of the vote. This was the last Labour Party leadership election which used the trade union block vote; the system was reformed under Smith's leadership to a one member, one vote system which was in place for the 1994 leadership election held two years later when Smith died suddenly of a heart attack.

The contest took place simultaneously with the 1992 Labour Party deputy leadership election.

== Candidates ==
- Bryan Gould, Shadow Secretary of State for the Environment, Member of Parliament for Dagenham
- John Smith, Shadow Chancellor of the Exchequer, Member of Parliament for Monklands East

== Result ==
Candidate	Affiliated block votes (40%)		CLP block votes (30%)		PLP votes (30%)		Overall result
Candidate	Votes	%	Votes	%	Votes	%	%
John Smith ✓	4,822	96.3	597	98.0	229	77.1	91.1
Bryan Gould	187	3.7	12	2.0	68	22.9	9.0

John Smith was elected leader of the Labour Party with a clear majority.

Shortly after Black Wednesday in September 1992, Labour's lead in the opinion polls began to rise. By the time of his sudden death, Smith was widely predicted and expected to become prime minister at the next general election.

In the event, he would only serve two years before his death, which precipitated another leadership election.

== Reactions ==
The Sunday Times described Tony Blair, the Shadow Employment Secretary at the time, as "The Leader Labour Missed" following Smith's win. Blair would go on to be leader between 1994 and 2007.

== See also ==
- 1992 Labour Party deputy leadership election
- Opinion polling for the 1997 United Kingdom general election
