= 1995 Epping Forest District Council election =

UK local election

- 4 May 1995

20 out of 59 seats to Epping Forest District Council 30 seats needed for a majority

	First party	Second party	Third party
Party	Labour	Conservative	Liberal Democrats
Last election	15 seats, 33.2%	23 seats, 33.8%	6 seats, 17.0%
Seats before	15	23	7
Seats after	18	18	10
Seat change	▲3	▼5	▲4
Popular vote	9,585	7,447	5,185
Percentage	37.0%	28.2%	20.0%
Swing	▲3.8%	▼5.6%	▲3.0%
	Fourth party	Fifth party	Sixth party
Party	Loughton Residents	Epping Residents	Independent
Last election	7 seats, 9.0%	3 seats, 4.5%	2 seats, N/A
Seats before	7	3	3
Seats after	7	3	3
Seat change	Steady	Steady	▲1
Popular vote	974	1,195	644
Percentage	3.7%	4.6%	2.4%
Swing	▼5.3%	▲0.1%	N/A
	Seventh party	Eighth party
Party	Ind. Conservative	SDP
Last election	1 seat, 1.8%	2 seats, 0.3%
Seats before	0	0 (Note: Buckhurst Hill East councillors, G. Dunseath defected from the SDP to the Liberal Democrats, while Cllr Croke defected to Labour.)
Seats after	0	0
Seat change	▼1	▼2
Popular vote	410	N/A
Percentage	1.5%	N/A
Swing	▼0.3%	N/A
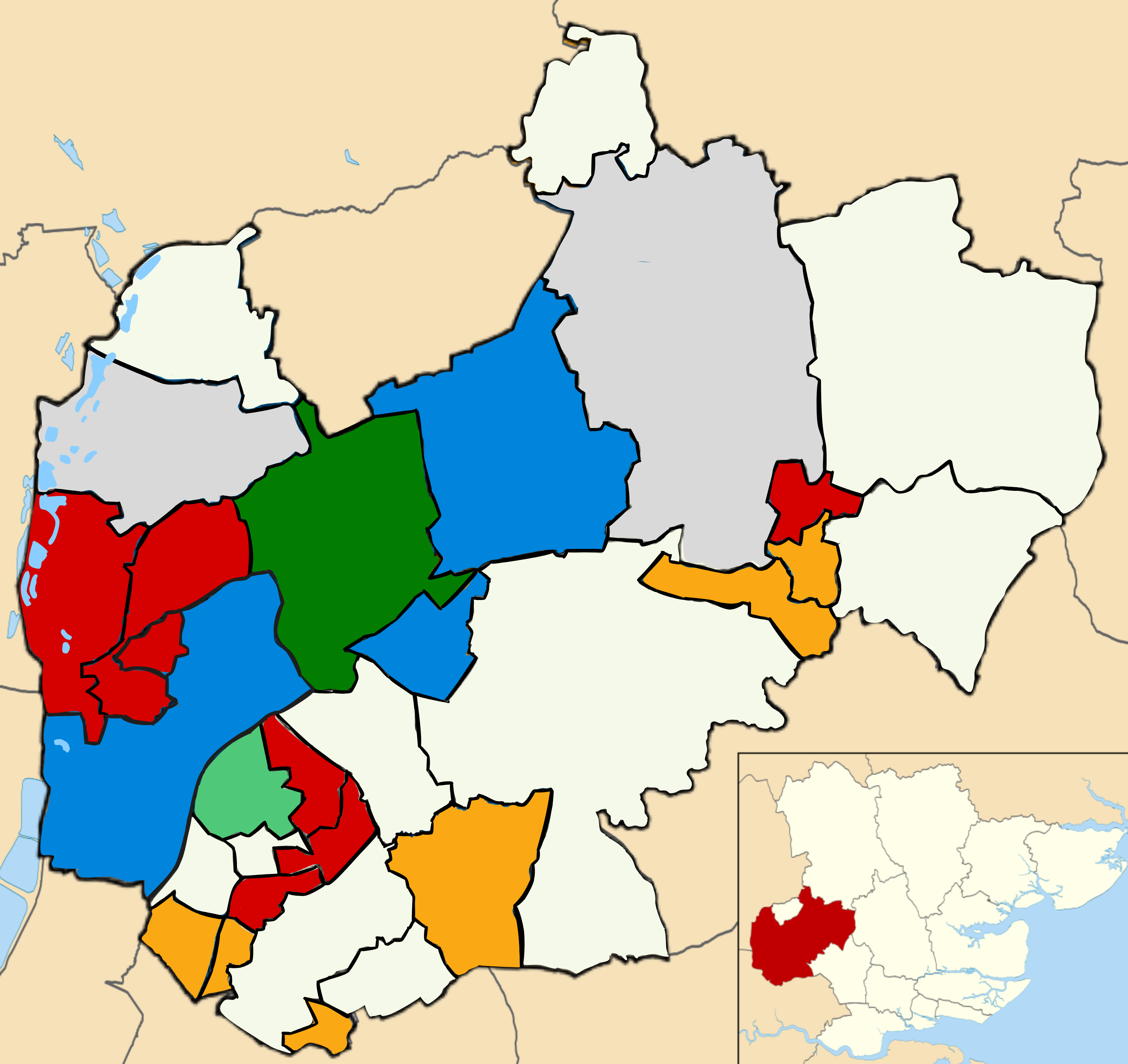
- Winner of each seat at the 1995 Epping Forest District Council election
Leader before election
Conservative minority administration
Leader after election
No overall control

The 1995 Epping Forest District Council election took place on 4 May 1995 to elect members of Epping Forest District Council in Essex, England. 20 members of Epping Forest District Council in Essex were elected. The council fell into no overall control with no party having control, though with Labour emerging with the most votes for the first ever time.

== Background ==
The 1995 Epping Forest District Council election saw significant political shifts across the district. Labour achieved its highest share of the vote ever in Epping Forest and equalled the Conservatives in seats, who suffered their lowest ever share of the vote and number of seats, securing just 18 councillors and 28.2% of the vote overall. This marked a historic decline for the Conservatives in the district.

The Liberal Democrats made notable gains, winning four seats and overtaking the Loughton Residents Association (LRA), which maintained its presence with seven seats, as the third party. The SDP ceased to exist on the council following this election, with Cllr Dunseath of Buckhurst Hill East having defected to the Liberal Democrats prior to the vote and not standing again, while Cllr Croke defected to Labour earlier. This marked the final appearance of the SDP in the Council Chamber.

Independent representation also shifted, with Cllr Richard Morgan relinquishing his identity as an Independent Conservative to become an Independent, joining Cllr Easton of Roydon and newly elected Cllr Carr of Nazeing as a group of three independents, consolidating non-aligned representation on the council.

The British National Party (BNP) contested Epping Forest for the first time, gaining a minor share of the vote (approximately 0.5%) in Debden Green. While their early results were minimal, the BNP would later increase their presence significantly, winning six councillors and 9.0% of the vote across the district by the mid- to late-2010s.

Nationally, the election took place against a backdrop of economic and social developments. Early in the year, Daewoo announced plans to build a new car factory in the UK, while the Rover Group and MGF sports car launch dominated the automotive sector. High-profile events such as Eric Cantona’s suspension and the MORI polling data, showing the Conservatives trailing Labour, sometimes by over 43%, reflected broader political shifts that were echoed locally in Epping Forest’s dramatic council election results.

== Results summary ==
1995 Epping Forest District Council election
Party	This election			Full council			This election		
Party	Seats	Net	Seats %	Other	Total	Total %	Votes	Votes %	+/−
Labour	7	▲3	35.0	11	18	30.5	9,585	37.0	▲3.8
Conservative	3	▼5	15.0	15	18	30.5	7,447	28.2	▼5.6
Liberal Democrats	6	▲4	30.0	4	10	16.9	5,185	20.0	▲3.0
Loughton Residents	1	Steady	5.0	6	7	11.8	974	3.7	▼5.3
Epping Residents	1	Steady	5.0	2	3	5.0	1,195	4.6	▲0.1
Independent	2	▲1	10.0	1	3	5.0	644	2.4	N/A
Ind. Conservative	0	▼1	0.0	0	0	0.0	410	1.5	▼0.3
BNP	0	Steady	0.0	0	0	0.0	142	0.5	N/A
Green	0	Steady	0.0	0	0	0.0	12	0.1	N/A
SDP	0	▼2	0.0	0	0	0.0	N/A	N/A	N/A

=== Buckhurst Hill East ===
Buckhurst Hill East
Party	Candidate	Votes	%	±%
Liberal Democrats	M. Heavens	836	64.6	▼5.6
Labour	L. Baddock	231	17.9	▲7.1
Conservative	R. Braybrook	227	17.5	▲2.4
Majority		605	46.8	▼8.3
Turnout		1,294	38.2	▼10.9
Registered electors		3,391		
Liberal Democrats gain from SDP		Swing		

=== Buckhurst Hill West ===
Buckhurst Hill West
Party	Candidate	Votes	%	±%
Liberal Democrats	M. Harding	1,023	57.5	▼3.7
Conservative	A. Torgut	607	34.1	▲0.7
Labour	D. Wing	150	8.4	▲4.5
Majority		416	23.4	N/A
Turnout		1,780	35.1	▼12.8
Registered electors		5,069		
Liberal Democrats gain from Conservative		Swing		

=== Chipping Ongar ===
Chipping Ongar
Party	Candidate	Votes	%	±%
Liberal Democrats	K. Wright*	310	42.8	▼10.1
Conservative	N. Deller	215	29.7	▼6.5
Labour	P. Haseldine	187	25.8	▲14.9
Green	L. Simon	12	1.7	N/A
Majority		95	13.1	▼3.6
Turnout		724	53.9	▼4.2
Registered electors		1,344		
Liberal Democrats hold		Swing		

=== Debden Green ===
Debden Green
Party	Candidate	Votes	%	±%
Labour	G. Huckle	1,013	72.4	▼1.8
Conservative	L. Daniel	245	17.5	▼8.3
BNP	I. Hernon	142	10.1	N/A
Majority		768	54.9	▲6.5
Turnout		1,400	35.9	▼3.6
Registered electors		3,900		
Labour hold		Swing		

=== Epping Hemnall ===
Epping Hemnall
Party	Candidate	Votes	%	±%
Conservative	D. Collins*	608	31.2	▲2.1
Liberal Democrats	J. Whitehouse	586	30.1	▼1.9
Epping Residents	L. Barry	432	22.2	▼1.0
Labour	B. Johns	321	16.5	▲0.7
Majority		22	1.1	▲1.8
Turnout		1,947	42.3	▼2.7
Registered electors		4,601		
Conservative hold		Swing		

=== Epping Lindsey ===
Epping Lindsey
Party	Candidate	Votes	%	±%
Epping Residents	A. O'Brien*	763	39.9	▼4.9
Labour	T. Norris	495	25.9	▲6.8
Conservative	J. Ashbridge	486	25.4	▲2.4
Liberal Democrats	A. Moss	167	8.7	▼4.4
Majority		268	14.0	▼7.9
Turnout		1,911	39.9	▼5.0
Registered electors		4,793		
Epping Residents Association hold		Swing		

=== Grange Hill ===
Grange Hill
Party	Candidate	Votes	%	±%
Liberal Democrats	P. Spencer	826	51.1	▲11.0
Conservative	E. Buttling	596	36.8	▼9.6
Labour	S. Miller	196	12.1	▼1.4
Majority		230	14.3	N/A
Turnout		1,618	35.7	
Registered electors		4,530		
Liberal Democrats gain from Conservative		Swing		

=== Greensted & Marden Ash ===
Greensted & Marden Ash
Party	Candidate	Votes	%	±%
Liberal Democrats	D. Jacobs*	516	62.6	▼1.1
Labour	R. Gross	155	18.8	▲11.8
Conservative	C. Pithers	153	18.6	▼10.7
Majority		361	43.8	▲9.4
Turnout		824	44.5	▼7.5
Registered electors		1,852		
Liberal Democrats hold		Swing		

=== High Beech ===
High Beech
Party	Candidate	Votes	%	±%
Conservative	N. Green	531	57.0	▼11.1
Labour	P. Burling	230	24.7	▼7.2
Liberal Democrats	C. Munday-Chanin	171	18.3	N/A
Majority		301	32.3	▼4.0
Turnout		932	43.5	▲0.8
Registered electors		2,158		
Conservative hold		Swing		

=== Lambourne ===
Lambourne
Party	Candidate	Votes	%	±%
Liberal Democrats	K. Easlea	515	61.5	▲23.4
Conservative	D. Pettitt	217	25.9	▼15.3
Labour	D. Martin	105	12.5	▼8.3
Majority		298	35.6	N/A
Turnout		837	59.0	▼4.7
Registered electors		1,418		
Liberal Democrats gain from Conservative		Swing		

=== Loughton Broadway ===
Loughton Broadway
Party	Candidate	Votes	%	±%
Labour	J. Davis*	1,380	86.7	▲4.6
Conservative	I. Locks	212	13.3	▼4.6
Majority		1,168	73.4	▲9.2
Turnout		1,592	39.6	▼8.1
Registered electors		4,022		
Labour hold		Swing		

=== Loughton Roding ===
Loughton Roding
Party	Candidate	Votes	%	±%
Labour	J. Humphreys*	1,047	62.2	▲12.2
Loughton Residents	M. Rogers	328	19.5	▼3.5
Conservative	J. Holland	209	12.4	▼3.0
Liberal Democrats	L. Wells	98	5.8	▼5.7
Majority		719	42.7	▲15.7
Turnout		1,682	58.3	▲5.9
Registered electors		2,885		
Labour hold		Swing		

=== Loughton St. Johns ===
Loughton St. Johns
Party	Candidate	Votes	%	±%
Loughton Residents	B. Moore	646	47.1	▼4.3
Conservative	S. Metcalfe	417	30.4	▼5.6
Labour	R. Larner	309	22.5	▲2.8
Majority		229	16.7	▼5.4
Turnout		1,372	32.3	▼7.7
Registered electors		4,245		
Loughton Residents hold		Swing		

=== Moreton & Matching ===
Moreton & Matching
Party	Candidate	Votes	%	±%
Independent	R. Morgan*	N/A	N/A	N/A
Majority		N/A	N/A	N/A
Turnout		N/A	N/A	N/A
Registered electors		1,595		
Independent gain from Ind. Conservative		Swing		

=== Nazeing ===
Nazeing
Party	Candidate	Votes	%	±%
Independent	J. Carr	441	30.4	N/A
Ind. Conservative	D. Borton	410	28.3	▼7.6
Conservative	E. Rowland	347	23.9	▼18.7
Labour	D. Miller	253	17.4	▼4.1
Majority		31	2.1	N/A
Turnout		1,451	45.0	▼2.0
Registered electors		3,223		
Independent gain from Independent		Swing		

=== North Weald Bassett ===
North Weald Bassett
Party	Candidate	Votes	%	±%
Conservative	I. Abbey	600	38.2	▼20.3
Labour	D. Tetlow	520	33.1	▼8.4
North Weald Residents	R. Wyness	249	15.8	N/A
Independent	M. May	203	12.9	N/A
Majority		80	5.1	▼32.2
Turnout		1,572	35.6	▼1.7
Registered electors		4,416		
Conservative hold		Swing		

=== Shelley ===
Shelley
Party	Candidate	Votes	%	±%
Labour	R. Barnes*	539	87.8	▲24.7
Conservative	J. Dean	75	12.2	▲0.7
Majority		464	75.6	▲38.0
Turnout		614	44.4	▼4.4
Registered electors		1,384		
Labour hold		Swing		

=== Waltham Abbey East ===
Waltham Abbey East
Party	Candidate	Votes	%	±%
Labour	S. Welton	930	51.8	▼5.7
Conservative	D. Spinks*	728	40.6	▼1.9
Liberal Democrats	C. Spence	137	7.6	N/A
Majority		202	11.2	N/A
Turnout		1,795	32.4	▼7.8
Registered electors		5,539		
Labour gain from Conservative		Swing		

=== Waltham Abbey Paternoster ===
Waltham Abbey Paternoster
Party	Candidate	Votes	%	±%
Labour	F. Harewood	700	58.6	▼5.8
Conservative	L. Rowley	495	41.4	▲5.8
Majority		205	17.2	▼11.6
Turnout		1,195	33.6	▼5.5
Registered electors		3,554		
Labour hold		Swing		

=== Waltham Abbey West ===
Waltham Abbey West
Party	Candidate	Votes	%	±%
Labour	L. Denham	824	63.2	▼1.2
Conservative	C. Pitman	479	36.8	▲1.2
Majority		345	26.5	▼2.4
Turnout		1,303	32.7	▼6.4
Registered electors		3,990		
Labour gain from Conservative		Swing		
