= 1992 Labour Party deputy leadership election =

Internal election in the British Labour Party

- 18 July 1992
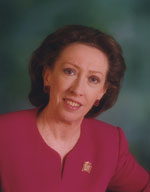

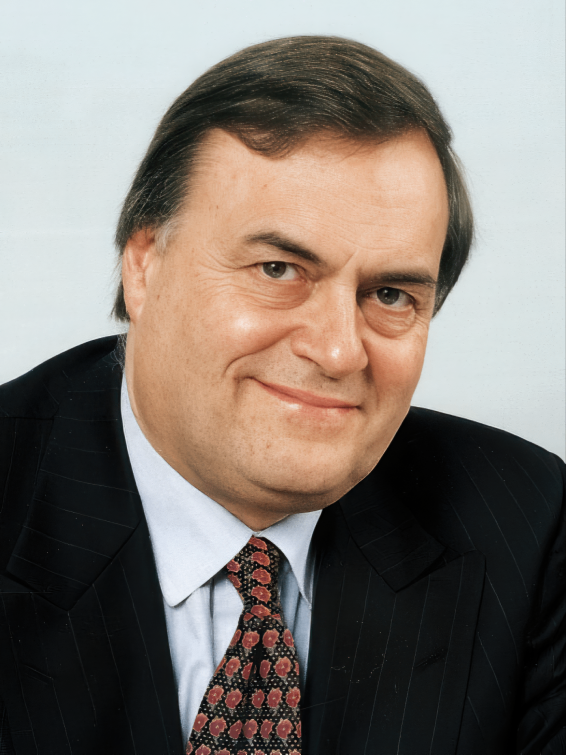

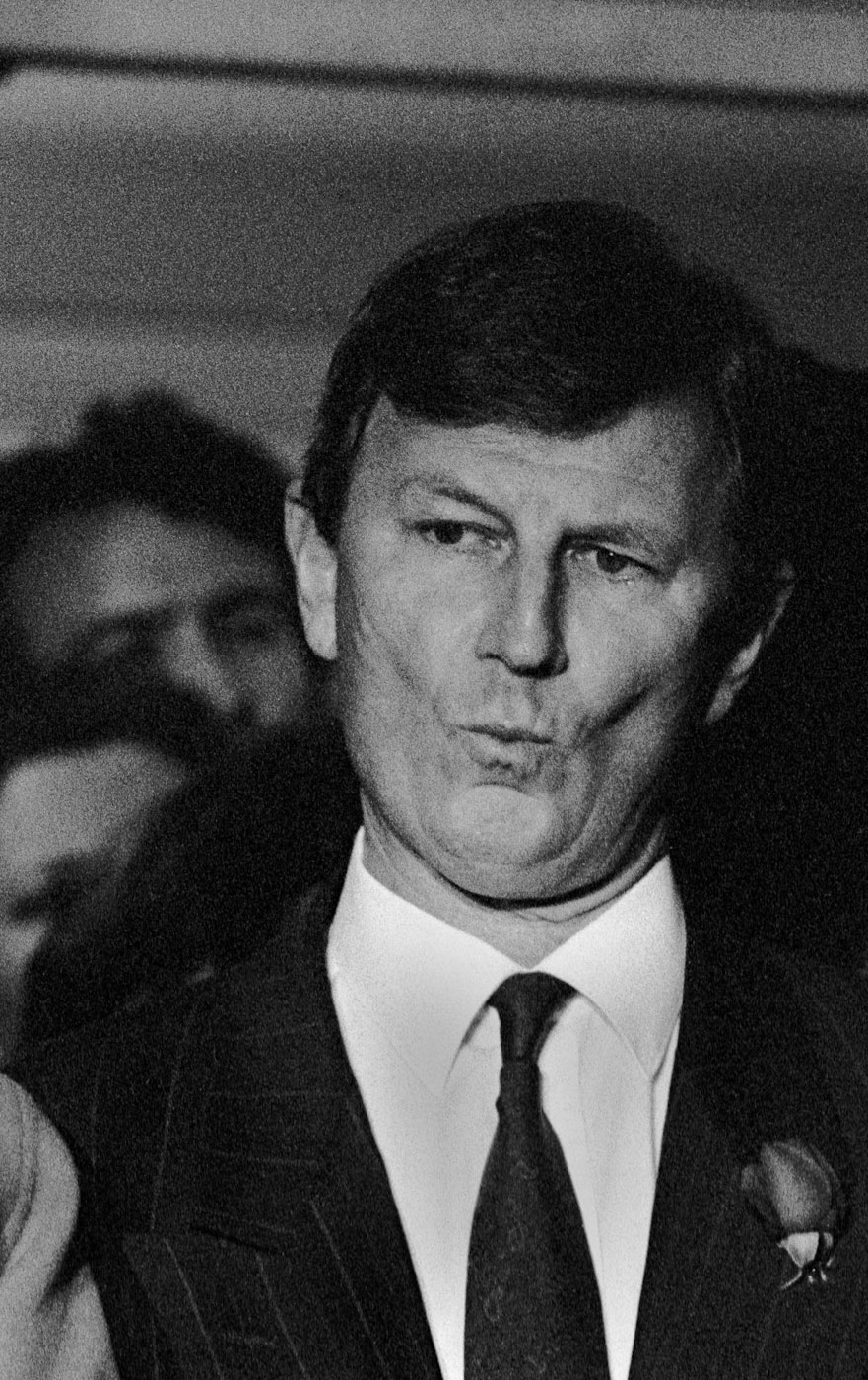
Candidate	Margaret Beckett	John Prescott	Bryan Gould
Overall result	57.3%	28.2%	14.5%
Affiliated unions	63.5%	29.1%	7.4%
Party members	63.5%	23.7%	12.9%
Labour MPs	42.9%	31.4%	25.7%
Deputy Leader before election
Roy Hattersley
Elected Deputy Leader
Margaret Beckett

The 1992 Labour Party deputy leadership election followed the Labour Party's failure to win the 1992 general election and the subsequent resignation of deputy party leader Roy Hattersley. The ballot took place on 18 July 1992 at Labour Party Conference. Affiliated organisations had 40% of the vote, while Constituency Labour Parties and the Parliamentary Labour Party had 30% each in the electoral college.

The election took place simultaneously with the 1992 Labour Party leadership election.

== Candidates ==
- Margaret Beckett, Shadow Chief Secretary to the Treasury, Member of Parliament for Derby South
- Bryan Gould, Shadow Secretary of State for the Environment, Member of Parliament for Dagenham
- John Prescott, Shadow Secretary of State for Transport, Member of Parliament for Kingston upon Hull East

== Result ==
Candidate	Affiliated block votes (40%)	CLP block votes (30%)	PLP votes (30%)	Overall result
Candidate	%	%	%	%
Margaret Beckett ✓	63.5	63.5	42.9	57.3
John Prescott	29.1	23.7	31.4	28.1
Bryan Gould	7.4	12.9	25.7	14.6

== See also ==
- 1992 Labour Party leadership election
- Opinion polling for the 1997 United Kingdom general election
