= 1994 Labour Party leadership election =

British political leadership election

- 30 June – 21 July 1994
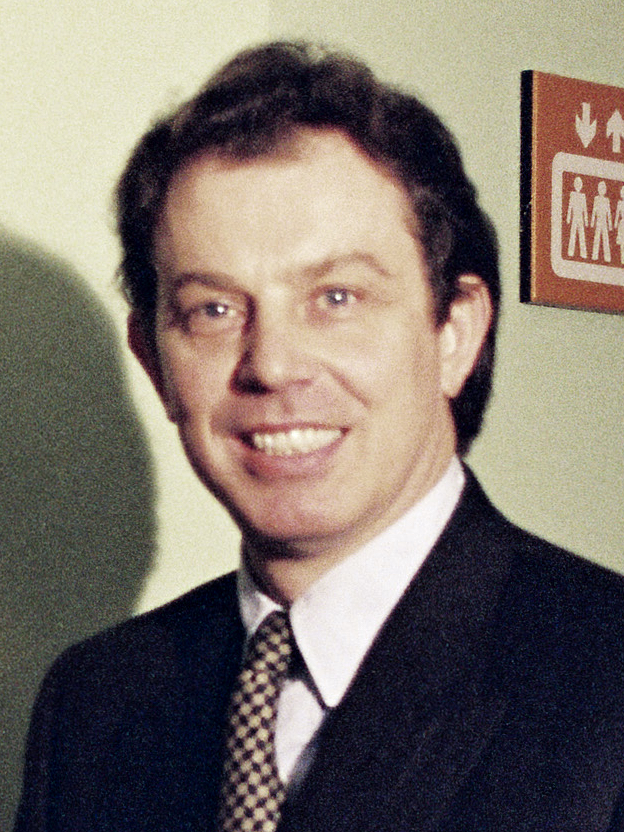

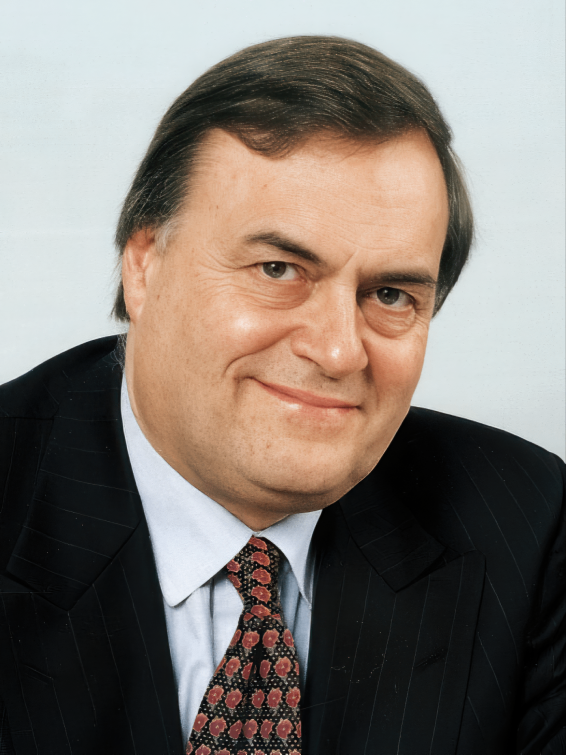

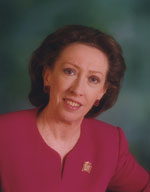
Candidate	Tony Blair	John Prescott	Margaret Beckett
Overall result	57.0%	24.1%	18.9%
Affiliated unions	52.3%	28.4%	19.3%
Party members	58.2%	24.4%	17.4%
MPs & MEPs	60.5%	19.6%	19.9%
Leader before election
Margaret Beckett (interim)
John Smith
Elected Leader
Tony Blair

The 1994 Labour Party leadership election was held on 21 July 1994 following the death of the incumbent leader, John Smith, on 12 May. Tony Blair won the leadership and became Prime Minister after winning the 1997 general election.

The election was the first held under the new leadership election rules that had been introduced in 1993, which included an element of one member, one vote. The poll for leader was held simultaneously with a deputy leadership vote.

== Candidates ==
Margaret Beckett had been the Deputy Leader of the Labour Party, and following Smith's death was serving as acting leader; she was the first female Labour MP ever to stand for the leadership of the party (and remained the only such MP until Diane Abbott announced her candidacy for the 2010 leadership election). Tony Blair was, at the time of his candidature, the Shadow Home Secretary.

It has been widely speculated that Shadow Chancellor Gordon Brown did not stand due to a pact agreed with Blair at the Granita restaurant in Islington, North London. Shortly after John Smith's death, Roy Hattersley telephoned Blair and urged him to stand for the Party leadership. Blair informed Hattersley that he was worried about "hurting Gordon", to which Hattersley replied that Blair should tell Gordon Brown that there had been "a lot of people in the past who had wanted to be leader of the Labour Party and have come to terms with the fact that they weren't going to be".

In a MORI poll conducted shortly after Smith's death among all Labour supporters, Blair took 32 per cent, Prescott 21 per cent, Beckett and Brown 12 per cent each, and Cook 7 per cent, suggesting that Brown had little chance of winning anyway.

Robin Cook, the Shadow Secretary of State for Trade and Industry stated that he would not run, as he did not believe he was attractive enough to the general electorate and that this would damage the party at the next election. John Prescott, who had stood at the 1992 deputy leadership election and lost to Beckett, stood again for both leader and deputy leader.

The "electoral college" system that had been introduced meant that the votes of members of affiliated groups (mostly trades unions), the members of constituency parties, and Labour MPs were all weighted equally.

- Margaret Beckett, incumbent Deputy Leader of the Labour Party, Member of Parliament for Derby South
- Tony Blair, Shadow Home Secretary, Member of Parliament for Sedgefield
- John Prescott, Shadow Secretary of State for Employment, Member of Parliament for Kingston upon Hull East

== Result ==
Candidate	Affiliated (33.3%)		Constituencies (33.3%)		PLP (33.3%)		Overall result
Candidate	Votes	%	Votes	%	Votes	%	%
Tony Blair ✓	407,637	52.3	100,313	58.2	198	60.5	57.0
John Prescott	221,367	28.4	42,053	24.4	64	19.6	24.1
Margaret Beckett	150,422	19.3	29,990	17.4	65	19.9	18.9

Tony Blair won, and led the party to its first general election victory for twenty-three years at the 1997 general election. Prescott won the deputy leadership poll, and went on to become Deputy Prime Minister during Blair's premiership. Beckett would also serve both in the Shadow Cabinet and then the Cabinet throughout Blair's term as leader, eventually becoming the last of the three Foreign Secretaries of the Blair ministries.

The next leadership election to take place occurred when Blair resigned in June 2007; this election was won by Gordon Brown, who ran uncontested. The next contested election would be in 2010, when Brown resigned.

== How each MP voted ==
MP	Leader vote	Deputy Leader vote
Diane Abbott	Beckett	Beckett
Irene Adams	Prescott	Prescott
Nick Ainger	Blair	Prescott
Bob Ainsworth	Blair	Prescott
Graham Allen	Blair	Beckett
Donald Anderson	Blair	Beckett
Janet Anderson	Blair	Prescott
Hilary Armstrong	Blair	Beckett
Joe Ashton	Blair	Prescott
John Austin-Walker	Beckett	Beckett
Tony Banks	Beckett	Beckett
Harry Barnes	Beckett	Beckett
Kevin Barron	Blair	Prescott
John Battle	Beckett	Beckett
Hugh Bayley	Blair	Prescott
Margaret Beckett	Beckett	Beckett
Stuart Bell	Blair	Beckett
Tony Benn	Prescott	Beckett
Andrew Bennett	Prescott	Prescott
Joe Benton	Blair	Prescott
Gerry Bermingham	Blair	Prescott
Roger Berry	Prescott	Beckett
Clive Betts	Blair	Beckett
Tony Blair	Blair	None
David Blunkett	Blair	Prescott
Paul Boateng	Blair	Beckett
Roland Boyes	Beckett	Beckett
Keith Bradley	Blair	Prescott
Jeremy Bray	Blair	Prescott
Gordon Brown	Blair	Beckett
Nick Brown	Beckett	Beckett
Richard Burden	Blair	Prescott
Stephen Byers	Blair	Beckett
Richard Caborn	Prescott	Prescott
Jim Callaghan	Blair	Prescott
Anne Campbell	Blair	Beckett
Ronnie Campbell	Prescott	Beckett
Dale Campbell-Savours	Blair	Beckett
Dennis Canavan	Beckett	Beckett
Jamie Cann	Blair	Prescott
Malcolm Chisholm	Beckett	Beckett
Judith Church	Blair	Beckett
Michael Clapham	Prescott	Beckett
David Clark	Blair	Beckett
Eric Clarke	Prescott	Prescott
Tom Clarke	Blair	Beckett
David Clelland	Blair	Beckett
Ann Clwyd	Blair	Prescott
Ann Coffey	Blair	Prescott
Harry Cohen	Beckett	Beckett
Michael Connarty	Blair	Prescott
Robin Cook	Blair	Prescott
Frank Cook	Prescott	Prescott
Robin Corbett	Blair	Prescott
Jeremy Corbyn	Beckett	Beckett
Jean Corston	Beckett	Beckett
Jim Cousins	Beckett	Beckett
Tom Cox	Blair	Beckett
John Cummings	Blair	Prescott
Lawrence Cunliffe	Blair	Prescott
Jack Cunningham	Blair	Beckett
Jim Cunningham	Blair	Prescott
Tam Dalyell	Prescott	Prescott
Alistair Darling	Blair	Beckett
Ian Davidson	Prescott	Prescott
Bryan Davies	Blair	Prescott
Denzil Davies	Prescott	Beckett
Ron Davies	Blair	Prescott
Terry Davis	Prescott	Prescott
John Denham	Blair	Beckett
Donald Dewar	Blair	Beckett
Don Dixon	Prescott	Prescott
Frank Dobson	Blair	Beckett
Brian Donohoe	Prescott	Prescott
Jim Dowd	Blair	Prescott
Jimmy Dunnachie	Blair	Prescott
Gwyneth Dunwoody	Prescott	Prescott
Angela Eagle	Beckett	Beckett
Ken Eastham	Prescott	Prescott
Derek Enright	Blair	Prescott
Bill Etherington	Prescott	Prescott
John Evans	Blair	Prescott
Derek Fatchett	Beckett	Beckett
Andrew Faulds	Blair	Prescott
Frank Field	Blair	Prescott
Mark Fisher	Blair	Prescott
Paul Flynn	Blair	Beckett
Derek Foster	Blair	Beckett
George Foulkes	Blair	Prescott
John Fraser	Blair	Beckett
Maria Fyfe	Beckett	Beckett
Sam Galbraith	Blair	Beckett
George Galloway	None	None
Mike Gapes	Blair	Beckett
John Garrett	Blair	Beckett
Bruce George	Blair	Prescott
Neil Gerrard	Beckett	Beckett
John Gilbert	Blair	Prescott
Norman Godman	Prescott	Prescott
Roger Godsiff	None	None
Llin Golding	Beckett	Beckett
Mildred Gordon	Beckett	Beckett
Tommy Graham	Prescott	Prescott
Bernie Grant	Beckett	Beckett
Nigel Griffiths	Blair	Beckett
Win Griffiths	Blair	Beckett
Bruce Grocott	Blair	Prescott
John Gunnell	Blair	Prescott
Peter Hain	Beckett	Prescott
Mike Hall	Prescott	Prescott
David Hanson	Blair	Prescott
Peter Hardy	Blair	Beckett
Harriet Harman	Blair	Beckett
Roy Hattersley	Blair	Prescott
Doug Henderson	Blair	Beckett
John Heppell	Beckett	Beckett
Keith Hill	Blair	Beckett
David Hinchliffe	Prescott	Prescott
Margaret Hodge	Blair	Beckett
Kate Hoey	Blair	Beckett
Norman Hogg	Blair	Beckett
Jimmy Hood	Prescott	Prescott
Geoff Hoon	Blair	Beckett
George Howarth	Blair	Beckett
Kim Howells	Blair	Beckett
Doug Hoyle	Prescott	Prescott
Bob Hughes	Prescott	Prescott
Kevin Hughes	Blair	Prescott
Roy Hughes	Blair	Prescott
John Hutton	Blair	Beckett
Eric Illsley	Prescott	Prescott
Adam Ingram	Blair	Beckett
Glenda Jackson	Blair	Beckett
Helen Jackson	Beckett	Beckett
David Jamieson	Blair	Beckett
Greville Janner	Blair	Prescott
Barry Jones	Blair	Beckett
Jon Owen Jones	Blair	Prescott
Lynne Jones	Beckett	Beckett
Martyn Jones	Prescott	Prescott
Tessa Jowell	Blair	Beckett
Gerald Kaufman	Blair	Prescott
Alan Keen	Blair	Beckett
Jane Kennedy	Blair	Prescott
Piara Khabra	Blair	Prescott
Peter Kilfoyle	Blair	Prescott
Neil Kinnock	Blair	Beckett
Joan Lestor	Prescott	Prescott
Terry Lewis	Beckett	Prescott
Helen Liddell	Blair	Prescott
Bob Litherland	Prescott	Prescott
Ken Livingstone	Beckett	Beckett
Tony Lloyd	Prescott	Prescott
Geoffrey Lofthouse	Blair	Prescott
Eddie Loyden	Beckett	Beckett
Calum MacDonald	Blair	Prescott
Andrew MacKinlay	Beckett	Prescott
Max Madden	Beckett	Beckett
Alice Mahon	Beckett	Beckett
Peter Mandelson	Blair	Prescott
John Marek	Beckett	Beckett
David Marshall	Prescott	Beckett
Jim Marshall	Beckett	Beckett
Michael Martin	Blair	Prescott
Eric Martlew	Blair	Prescott
John Maxton	Blair	Beckett
John McAllion	Prescott	Prescott
Tommy McAvoy	Blair	Prescott
Ian McCartney	Prescott	Prescott
John McFall	Blair	Prescott
Willie McKelvey	Prescott	Prescott
Henry McLeish	Blair	Beckett
Gordon McMaster	Prescott	Prescott
Kevin McNamara	Blair	Beckett
Denis MacShane	Blair	Prescott
John McWilliam	Blair	Beckett
Michael Meacher	Prescott	Prescott
Alan Meale	Prescott	Prescott
Alun Michael	Blair	Beckett
Bill Michie	Beckett	Beckett
Alan Milburn	Blair	Beckett
Andrew Miller	Blair	Prescott
Austin Mitchell	Blair	Prescott
Lewis Moonie	Blair	Beckett
Rhodri Morgan	Blair	Prescott
Elliot Morley	Blair	Prescott
Alf Morris	Blair	Beckett
Estelle Morris	Blair	Prescott
John Morris	Blair	Prescott
Mo Mowlam	Blair	Prescott
George Mudie	Blair	Prescott
Chris Mullin	Blair	Beckett
Paul Murphy	Blair	Prescott
Mike O'Brien	Blair	Prescott
Bill O'Brien	Blair	Prescott
Eddie O'Hara	Blair	Prescott
Martin O'Neill	Blair	Prescott
Gordon Oakes	Blair	Beckett
Bill Olner	Blair	Prescott
Stan Orme	Blair	Prescott
Bob Parry	Prescott	Prescott
Terry Patchett	Prescott	Spoilt
Tom Pendry	Blair	Prescott
Colin Pickthall	Prescott	Prescott
Peter Pike	Beckett	Beckett
Greg Pope	Blair	Prescott
Ray Powell	Prescott	Prescott
Bridget Prentice	Blair	Prescott
Gordon Prentice	Beckett	Beckett
John Prescott	Prescott	Prescott
Dawn Primarolo	Beckett	Beckett
Ken Purchase	Beckett	Beckett
Joyce Quin	Blair	Beckett
Giles Radice	Blair	Beckett
Stuart Randall	Blair	Beckett
Nick Raynsford	Blair	Beckett
Martin Redmond	Prescott	Prescott
John Reid	Blair	Prescott
George Robertson	Blair	Beckett
John Home Robertson	Blair	Prescott
Geoffrey Robinson	Blair	Prescott
Barbara Roche	Beckett	Beckett
Allan Rogers	Blair	Prescott
Jeff Rooker	Blair	Prescott
Terry Rooney	Beckett	Prescott
Ernie Ross	Blair	Prescott
Ted Rowlands	Blair	Prescott
Joan Ruddock	Blair	Beckett
Brian Sedgemore	Beckett	Prescott
Barry Sheerman	Blair	Beckett
Robert Sheldon	Blair	Prescott
Peter Shore	Blair	Prescott
Clare Short	Beckett	Beckett
Alan Simpson	Beckett	Beckett
Dennis Skinner	Beckett	Beckett
Andrew Smith	Blair	Beckett
Chris Smith	Blair	Beckett
Llew Smith	Prescott	Beckett
Peter Snape	Prescott	Prescott
Clive Soley	Blair	Prescott
Nigel Spearing	Beckett	Beckett
John Spellar	Blair	Prescott
Rachel Squire	Blair	Beckett
Gerry Steinberg	Blair	Prescott
George Stevenson	Beckett	Beckett
Roger Stott	Blair	Prescott
Gavin Strang	Blair	Beckett
Jack Straw	Blair	None
Gerry Sutcliffe	Blair	Prescott
Ann Taylor	Blair	Beckett
Jack Thompson	Blair	Prescott
Stephen Timms	Blair	Beckett
Paddy Tipping	Beckett	Beckett
Dennis Turner	Blair	Beckett
Keith Vaz	Blair	Beckett
Harold Walker	Blair	Prescott
Joan Walley	Prescott	Prescott
Gareth Wardell	None	None
Bob Wareing	Prescott	Prescott
Mike Watson	Blair	Prescott
Malcolm Wicks	Blair	Prescott
Alan J. Williams	Blair	Prescott
Alan W. Williams	Blair	Beckett
Brian Wilson	Blair	Prescott
David Winnick	Prescott	Beckett
Audrey Wise	Beckett	Beckett
Tony Worthington	Blair	Prescott
Jimmy Wray	Prescott	Prescott
Tony Wright	Blair	Prescott
David Young	Prescott	Prescott

== See also ==
- 1994 Labour Party deputy leadership election
- Blair–Brown deal
