= Wayne Gould =

Hong Kong retired judge (born 1945)

Wayne Gould (高樂德) (born 3 July 1945 in Hāwera, New Zealand) is a retired Hong Kong judge, known for helping to popularise sudoku puzzles in the United Kingdom and the United States.

In the mid-2000s, he pioneered the global success and popularity of the Sudoku puzzle outside Japan where it had been popular for about two decades. Gould worked as a judge in the criminal courts of Hong Kong until 1997. In 1997 he noticed a sudoku book in a bookshop in Tokyo. Gould then spent six years developing a computer program, known as Pappocom Sudoku, that could mass-produce puzzles for the global market. In September 2004, he published a puzzle in The Conway Daily Sun (of North Conway, New Hampshire) in the United States, and he convinced the London Times to publish the puzzle, starting in November 2004. His work led to the publication of sudoku puzzles in many UK newspapers.

Part of his strategy was offering newspapers a daily puzzle at no charge, unique to each paper, for publication accompanied by an offer of its solution via the Pappocom website. The website also offered those consulting it a low-cost program that generates and, if desired, assists in solving, unlimited Sudoku puzzles of a difficulty and style specified by the user.

He is also editor of several paperback collections of the puzzles called Su Doku: The Utterly Addictive Number-placing Puzzle, published in 2005 by The Times Books (ISBN 0-00-720732-8, ISBN 0-00-721350-6, ISBN 0-00-721426-X).

He was named one of the Time 100 world's most influential people of 2006 by Time magazine. He is the brother of the former British politician Bryan Gould.

== See also ==
- Howard Garns
