= Peter Dunphy =

British business person and film producer

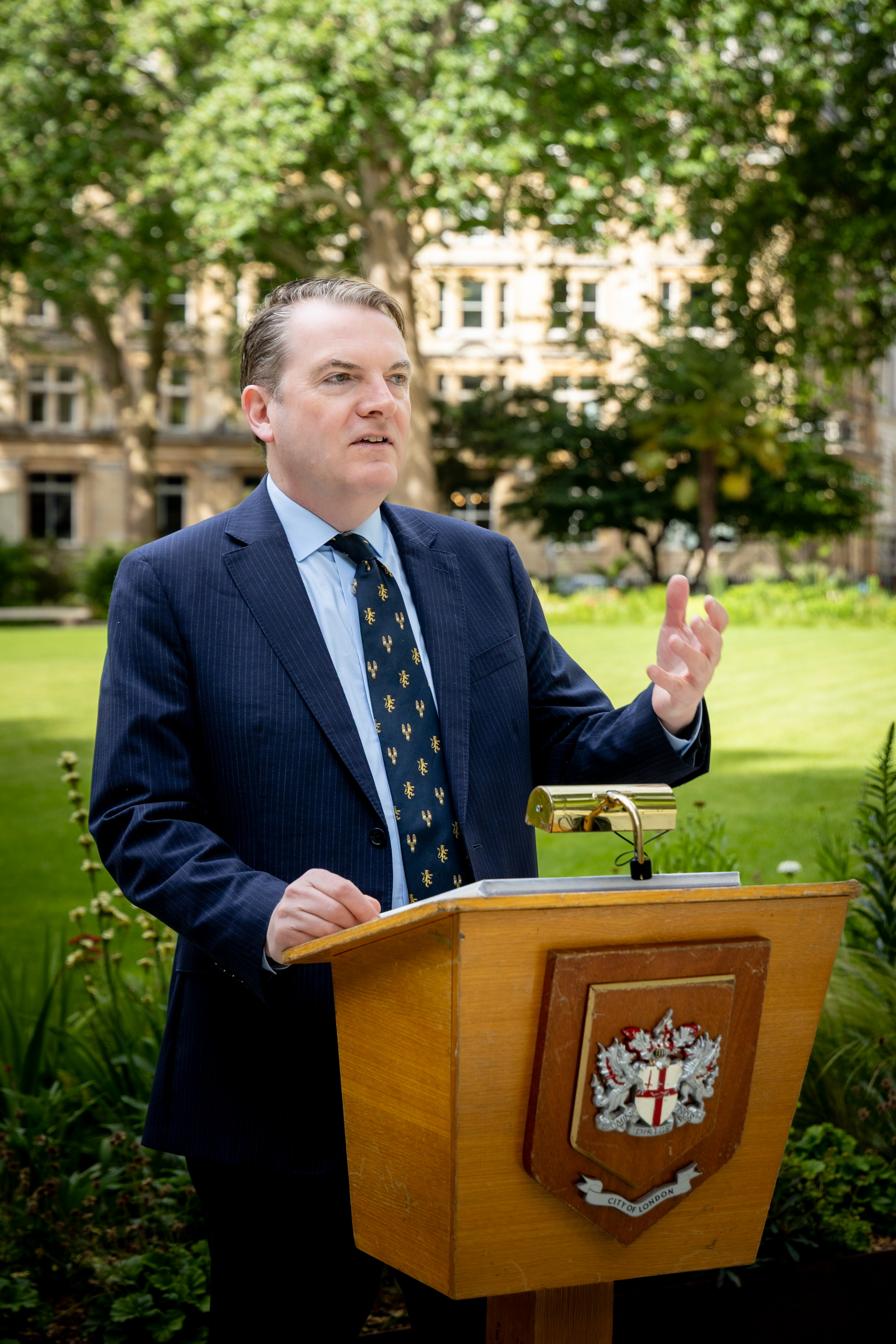
- Dunphy in 2025
- Born: 1 June 1966 (age 60); Consett, Co. Durham, UK
- Education: St Bede's Catholic School, Lanchester University of Liverpool
- Occupations: Business investment advisor; Film producer; Councillor and Chief Commoner of the City of London Corporation

Peter Gerard Dunphy MBE (born 1 June 1966) is a British staffing business CEO and Film Producer, who served as Chief Commoner of the City of London Corporation for 2024/25.

== Early life and education ==
Born in 1966 at Consett, Peter Dunphy MBE was brought up in Lanchester, County Durham, and educated at St Bede's School and the University of Liverpool.

== Career ==
Dunphy is a business investment adviser and was previously an investment director of James Caan's Hamilton Bradshaw Private Equity, and the founder and CEO of City of London based recruitment company, Dryden Human Capital (formerly Darwin Rhodes Group), at the time the largest insurance staffing firm globally with offices in 11 countries. He successfully sold the business in 2012 to private equity funds.

Also a film producer (as Peter Gerard Dunphy), he has acted as Lead Producer or Executive Producer for over a dozen films including Mad to Be Normal starring David Tennant, Elisabeth Moss, Gabriel Byrne and Michael Gambon; Funny Cow starring Maxine Peake, Paddy Considine and Stephen Graham; Letters to Sofija, Two Graves with Cathy Tyson, Dave Johns and David Hayman; the feature length autobiographical The Quiet One about Bill Wyman of The Rolling Stones, Surviving Christmas with the Relatives, Chris Gollon: Life in Paint featuring British painter Chris Gollon and the feature-length documentary Bicycle.

== Politics ==
Dunphy unsuccessfully contested Hornsey and Wood Green as the Liberal Democrat parliamentary candidate at the 1992 general election and at the 1994 Dagenham by-election, and Walthamstow at the 2001 general election. Between 2012 and 2018 he served as the Lib Dem's Registered Treasurer and Finance Committee Chair responsible for overseeing budgets, party spending and PPERA and Electoral Commission compliance. Peter Dunphy Consulting has donated £152,637 (£138,658 personally) to the LibDems over several years.

An Independent Common Councilman for the Ward of Cornhill, first elected in 2009 and returned in 2013, 2017, 2022 and 2025, Dunphy was elected Chairman of the City Licensing Committee in 2016, Chief Commoner of the City of London Corporation (for 2024/25) and Chairman of the Port Health and Environmental Services Committee in 2025.

Dunphy was, along with former MP Heidi Allen, founding director of Unite to Remain, the electoral pact between parties which supported remaining in the European Union at the 2019 UK general election.

== Charitable work ==
A Liveryman of the Worshipful Company of Drapers, Dunphy is a long-serving Trustee of the Honourable The Irish Society, serving as Deputy Governor (Managing Director) between 2019 and 2021.. He was recognised in the 2026 New Year's Honours List with a Member of the Order of the British Empire for services to Amenity Conservation and to Volunteering.

== See also ==
- City of London Corporation
