= Opinion polling for the 1997 United Kingdom general election =

Opinion polling for the 1997 United Kingdom general election was carried out by various organisations to gauge voting intention. The opinion polls listed range from the previous election on 9 April 1992 to the election on 1 May 1997.

Most opinion polls do not cover Northern Ireland, since its 18 seats were not contested by the political parties standing for election in the rest of the United Kingdom.

== Graphical summary ==
By the end of 1992 Labour had established a lead over the Conservatives which lasted until the 1997 election.

Labour Conservatives Liberal Democrats

== National poll results ==
Most national opinion polls do not cover Northern Ireland, which has different major political parties from the rest of the United Kingdom. Most polls listed only cover Great Britain (England, Scotland and Wales), and exclude Northern Ireland unless otherwise stated. Due to rounding, total figures may not add up to 100%. The lead is calculated by subtracting the polling percentage of the first party (shaded in the party's colour, and in bold) by that of the second party.

=== 1997 ===
Date(s) conducted	Pollster	Client	Con	Lab	LD	Rfr	Lead
1 May 1997	1997 general election (Note: Great Britain results; excludes Northern Ireland.)		31.4%	44.4%	17.2%	2.7%	13.0
30 Apr	MORI	Evening Standard	29%	47%	19%	–	18
29–30 Apr	ICM	The Guardian	33%	43%	18%	–	10
29–30 Apr	Gallup	The Daily Telegraph	33%	46%	16%	1%	13
29 Apr	MORI	The Times	27%	51%	15%	–	24
29 Apr	NOP	Reuters	28%	50%	14%	–	22
28–29 Apr	Gallup	The Daily Telegraph	31%	51%	13%	–	20
28–29 Apr	Harris	The Independent	31%	48%	15%	–	17
26–28 Apr	Gallup	The Daily Telegraph	29%	51%	13%	–	22
24–28 Apr	Gallup	Channel 4	31%	49%	14%	–	18
25–27 Apr	Gallup	The Daily Telegraph	30%	49%	14%	–	19
24–26 Apr	Gallup	The Sunday Telegraph	31%	48%	13%	–	17
25 Apr	NOP	The Sunday Times	29%	47%	16%	–	18
23–25 Apr	Gallup	The Daily Telegraph	32%	48%	14%	–	16
23–25 Apr	ICM	The Observer	32%	47%	16%	–	15
23–24 Apr	MORI	Independent on Sunday	29%	53%	12%	3%	24
22–24 Apr	Gallup	The Daily Telegraph	32%	48%	12%	–	16
21–23 Apr	Gallup	The Daily Telegraph	30%	50%	12%	–	20
22 Apr	MORI	The Times	27%	48%	17%	3%	21
20–22 Apr	Gallup	The Daily Telegraph	30%	51%	12%	4%	21
18–22 Apr	Gallup	Channel 4	31%	50%	13%	–	19
20–21 Apr	ICM	The Guardian	37%	42%	14%	–	5
18–21 Apr	Gallup	The Daily Telegraph	32%	48%	12%	3%	16
20 Apr	Gallup	The Daily Telegraph	32%	48%	13%	–	16
19–20 Apr	Harris	The Independent	30%	48%	15%	–	18
16–19 Apr	Gallup	The Sunday Telegraph	31%	50%	13%	–	19
18 Apr	NOP	The Sunday Times	29%	47%	17%	–	18
16–18 Apr	Gallup	The Daily Telegraph	32%	50%	13%	2%	18
16–18 Apr	ICM	The Observer	31%	48%	15%	–	17
15–17 Apr	Gallup	The Daily Telegraph	31%	50%	12%	–	19
14–16 Apr	Gallup	The Daily Telegraph	31%	50%	11%	–	19
15 Apr	MORI	The Times	32%	49%	13%	2%	17
13–15 Apr	Gallup	The Daily Telegraph	30%	51%	12%	3%	21
13–14 Apr	ICM	The Guardian	31%	45%	19%	–	14
12–14 Apr	Gallup	The Daily Telegraph	32%	49%	14%	–	17
11–14 Apr	Harris	The Independent	31%	49%	13%	–	18
11–14 Apr	MORI	Evening Standard	29%	50%	15%	–	21
13 Apr	Gallup	The Daily Telegraph	30%	50%	14%	–	20
10–12 Apr	Gallup	The Daily Telegraph	32%	49%	14%	–	17
9–12 Apr	Gallup	The Sunday Telegraph	31%	50%	13%	–	19
11 Apr	NOP	The Sunday Times	28%	49%	16%	–	21
9–11 Apr	Gallup	The Daily Telegraph	32%	52%	11%	–	20
9–11 Apr	ICM	The Observer	32%	48%	15%	–	16
8–10 Apr	Gallup	The Daily Telegraph	30%	52%	11%	–	22
7–9 Apr	Gallup	The Daily Telegraph	29%	53%	12%	–	24
8 Apr	MORI	The Times	34%	49%	12%	1%	15
6–8 Apr	Gallup	The Daily Telegraph	32%	51%	11%	–	19
6–7 Apr	ICM	The Guardian	34%	46%	15%	–	12
5–7 Apr	Gallup	The Daily Telegraph	33%	53%	10%	–	20
4–7 Apr	Harris	The Independent	28%	54%	12%	–	26
4–6 Apr	Gallup	The Daily Telegraph	30%	55%	10%	–	25
4 Apr	NOP	Reuters	29%	52%	11%	–	23
2–4 Apr	ICM	The Observer	30%	50%	14%	–	20
3 Apr	NOP	The Sunday Times	28%	52%	12%	–	24
3 Apr	Harris	Central News	29%	55%	11%	–	26
2–3 Apr	MORI	Independent on Sunday	30%	55%	9%	3%	25
1–3 Apr	Gallup	Channel 4	30%	54%	11%	–	24
26 Mar – 2 Apr	Gallup	The Daily Telegraph	31%	52%	11%	1%	21
5 Mar – 2 Apr	G9000	N/A	29.8%	53.7%	10.8%	–	23.9
1 Apr	MORI	The Times	28%	55%	11%	2%	27
27–31 Mar	Harris	The Independent	28%	52%	14%	3%	24
29–31 Mar	ICM	The Guardian	32%	46%	17%	–	14
21–24 Mar	MORI	The Times	29%	50%	14%	3%	21
20–24 Mar	Harris	The Independent	28%	56%	10%	2%	28
19–21 Mar	Gallup	The Sunday Telegraph	27%	56%	11%	–	29
15–17 Mar	Gallup	The Daily Telegraph	28.5%	56.5%	9.5%	1.5%	28
14–17 Mar	Harris	The Independent	27%	58%	10%	2%	31
14 Mar	NOP	Reuters	29%	54%	11%	–	25
13 Mar	NOP	The Sunday Times	26%	54%	13%	–	28
7–10 Mar	Harris	The Independent	26%	53%	14%	–	27
9 Mar	ORB	Ladbrokes	26%	56%	12%	–	30
28 Feb – 4 Mar	Gallup	The Daily Telegraph	28%	54%	12.5%	2%	26
10 Feb – 4 Mar	G9000	N/A	32.8%	50.9%	10.8%	–	18.1
28 Feb – 3 Mar	Harris	The Independent	30%	55%	10%	–	25
28 Feb – 2 Mar	ICM	The Guardian	30%	48%	16%	–	18
27 Feb	Wirral South by-election (Lab gain from Con)						
21–24 Feb	MORI	The Times	31%	52%	11%	2%	21
21 Feb	NOP	Reuters	29%	51%	14%	2%	22
13 Feb	NOP	The Sunday Times	30%	49%	13%	–	19
30 Jan – 4 Feb	Gallup	The Daily Telegraph	34%	49%	12%	1%	15
31 Jan – 2 Feb	ICM	The Guardian	32%	48%	15%	–	16
24–28 Jan	MORI	The Times	30%	55%	11%	–	25
8–28 Jan	G9000	N/A	33%	50.5%	11.3%	1.3%	17.5
16 Jan	NOP	The Sunday Times	31%	54%	12%	1%	23
11–15 Jan	Gallup	The Daily Telegraph	32.5%	50.5%	10.5%	–	18
5 Jan	ORB	Ladbrokes	30%	53%	12%	–	23
3–5 Jan	ICM	The Guardian	31%	48%	16%	–	17

=== 1996 ===
Date(s) conducted	Pollster	Client	Con	Lab	LD	Lead
14 Dec	ICM	The Observer	30%	50%	14%	20
12 Dec	Barnsley East by-election (Lab hold)					
9 Dec	MORI	The Times	30%	51%	13%	21
2 Dec	Gallup	The Daily Telegraph	22%	59%	12%	37
1 Dec	ICM	The Guardian	31%	50%	15%	19
29 Nov	MORI	The European	30%	52%	13%	22
14 Nov	NOP	The Sunday Times	26%	56%	13%	30
11 Nov	MORI	The Times	33%	50%	12%	17
5 Nov	Gallup	The Daily Telegraph	28%	55%	11%	17
2 Nov	ICM	The Guardian	34%	47%	15%	13
1 Nov	MORI	Mail on Sunday	30%	54%	12%	24
28 Oct	MORI	The Times	28%	56%	12%	18
21 Oct	MORI	N/A	27%	54%	12%	17
17 Oct	NOP	The Sunday Times	33%	47%	14%	24
14 Oct	MORI	N/A	30%	53%	12%	23
7 Oct	MORI	N/A	29%	54%	13%	25
5 Oct	ICM	The Guardian	31%	49%	16%	18
4 Oct	Gallup	The Daily Telegraph	24%	57%	15%	33
3 Oct	NOP	The Sunday Times	25%	57%	13%	32
1 Oct	Gallup	The Daily Telegraph	27.5%	52%	15%	24.5
24 Sep	Gallup	The Daily Telegraph	27%	54%	13.5%	27
23 Sep	MORI	The Times	29%	52%	14%	23
19 Sep	NOP	The Sunday Times	31%	50%	14%	19
9 Sep	MORI	N/A	28%	56%	12%	28
7 Sep	ICM	The Guardian	32%	47%	16%	15
3 Sep	Gallup	The Daily Telegraph	25.5%	58.5%	11%	33
25 Aug	MORI	The Times	30%	51%	13%	27
15 Aug	NOP	The Sunday Times	28%	54%	14%	26
12 Aug	MORI	N/A	30%	52%	13%	22
5 Aug	Gallup	The Daily Telegraph	25%	59%	11%	34
3 Aug	ICM	The Guardian	33%	45%	19%	12
28 Jul	MORI	The Times	29%	53%	12%	24
25 Jul	NOP	The Sunday Times	29%	51%	16%	22
6 Jul	ICM	The Guardian	30%	45%	21%	15
1 Jul	Gallup	The Daily Telegraph	26%	54.5%	14.5%	28.5
1 Jul	MORI	N/A	32%	52%	12%	20
24 Jun	MORI	The Times	31%	52%	12%	21
20 Jun	NOP	The Sunday Times	27%	55%	15%	28
10 Jun	MORI	N/A	27%	56%	13%	29
6 Jun	ICM	The Guardian	30%	46%	19%	16
3 Jun	Gallup	The Daily Telegraph	22.5%	57%	16%	34.5
2 Jun	ICM	The Guardian	30%	46%	19%	16
30 May	Northern Ireland Forum election					
26 May	MORI	The Times	27%	54%	15%	27
16 May	NOP	The Sunday Times	27%	52%	17%	25
13 May	MORI	N/A	27%	56%	13%	29
6 May	Gallup	The Daily Telegraph	24.5%	55.5%	15.5%	31
5 May	ICM	The Guardian	28%	45%	21%	17
3 May	ICM	The Sunday Express	26%	52%	15%	26
2 May	Local elections in England					
27 Apr	MORI	The Sun	29%	54%	13%	25
25 Apr	NOP	The Sunday Times	28%	52%	16%	24
22 Apr	MORI	The Times	28%	54%	14%	26
13 Apr	ICM	The Guardian	29%	50%	17%	21
11 Apr	South East Staffordshire by-election (Lab gain from Con)					
1 Apr	Gallup	The Daily Telegraph	26%	55.5%	15.5%	29.5
25 Mar	MORI	The Times	28%	57%	13%	29
14 Mar	NOP	The Sunday Times	27%	55%	14%	28
11 Mar	MORI	N/A	29%	55%	13%	26
4 Mar	Gallup	The Daily Telegraph	23%	57.5%	16%	34.5
4 Mar	ICM	The Guardian	31%	45%	20%	14
26 Feb	MORI	The Times	26%	57%	14%	31
16 Feb	NOP	The Sunday Times	25%	54%	16%	29
12 Feb	MORI	N/A	26%	57%	14%	31
5 Feb	Gallup	The Daily Telegraph	28%	54.5%	14.5%	26.5
4 Feb	ICM	The Guardian	31%	47%	19%	16
1 Feb	Hemsworth by-election (Lab hold)					
29 Jan	MORI	N/A	28%	54%	15%	26
22 Jan	MORI	The Times	29%	55%	13%	26
19 Jan	NOP	The Sunday Times	25%	54%	18%	25
17 Jan	NOP	N/A	33%	47%	14%	14
8 Jan	Gallup	The Daily Telegraph	21%	60.5%	14.5%	39.5
6 Jan	ICM	The Guardian	26%	48%	22%	22
3 Jan	NOP	The Sunday Times	29%	52%	13%	23

=== 1995 ===
Date(s) conducted	Pollster	Client	Con	Lab	LD	Lead
15 Dec	NOP	The Sunday Times	25%	55%	16%	30
14 Dec	ICM	The Observer	30%	50%	14%	20
9 Dec	ICM	The Guardian	26%	48%	22%	22
4 Dec	Gallup	The Daily Telegraph	23%	62%	12%	39
4 Dec	MORI	The Times	28%	55%	13%	27
1 Dec	NOP	The Sunday Times	25%	57%	15%	32
20 Nov	MORI	The Times	26%	56%	14%	30
17 Nov	NOP	The Sunday Times	27%	56%	13%	29
5 Nov	ICM	The Guardian	31%	48%	16%	17
30 Oct	Gallup	The Daily Telegraph	21.5%	61%	14.5%	39.5
23 Oct	MORI	The Times	27%	56%	13%	29
20 Oct	NOP	The Sunday Times	23%	59%	15%	36
7 Oct	ICM	The Guardian	30%	47%	19%	17
2 Oct	Gallup	The Daily Telegraph	25.5%	55.5%	14%	30
25 Sep	MORI	The Times	28%	51%	16%	23
15 Sep	NOP	The Sunday Times	27%	53%	17%	26
9 Sep	ICM	The Guardian	31%	48%	17%	17
4 Sep	Gallup	The Daily Telegraph	26.5%	54.5%	14%	28
28 Aug	MORI	The Times	25%	56%	15%	31
18 Aug	NOP	The Sunday Times	24%	57%	15%	33
5 Aug	ICM	The Guardian	31%	48%	17%	17
31 Jul	Gallup	The Daily Telegraph	22.5%	57.5%	14.5%	35
31 Jul	ICM	The Daily Express	24%	58%	14%	34
27 Jul	Littleborough and Saddleworth by-election (LD gain from Con)					
24 Jul	MORI	The Times	26%	59%	12%	33
21 Jul	MORI	London Weekend Television	30%	52%	13%	22
21 Jul	NOP	The Sunday Times	26%	55%	14%	29
8 Jul	ICM	The Guardian	32%	47%	17%	15
4 Jul	John Major is re-elected leader of the Conservative Party in a leadership challenge					
3 Jul	Gallup	The Daily Telegraph	25.5%	57%	13%	31.5
3 Jul	MORI	The European	33%	52%	10%	19
27 Jun	MORI	The Economist	31%	55%	11%	24
26 Jun	MORI	The Times	29%	56%	13%	27
24 Jun	MORI	Mail on Sunday	32%	54%	11%	22
15 Jun	North Down by-election (UKUP gain from UPUP)					
10 Jun	ICM	The Guardian	24%	53%	19%	29
5 Jun	Gallup	The Daily Telegraph	20%	59.5%	14.5%	39.5
25 May	Perth and Kinross by-election (SNP gain from Con)					
22 May	MORI	The Times	22%	58%	16%	36
13 May	ICM	The Guardian	29%	48%	19%	19
8 May	Gallup	The Daily Telegraph	23%	55.5%	16.5%	32.5
4 May	Local elections in England and Wales					
24 Apr	MORI	The Times	26%	56%	15%	30
8 Apr	ICM	The Guardian	26%	51%	18%	25
6 Apr	Local elections in Scotland					
3 Apr	Gallup	The Daily Telegraph	23%	57.5%	15%	34.5
24 Mar	MORI	The Sunday Times	25%	59%	12%	34
20 Mar	MORI	The Times	25%	57%	13%	32
11 Mar	ICM	The Guardian	27%	52%	17%	25
27 Feb	Gallup	The Daily Telegraph	20.5%	60.5%	15%	40
20 Feb	MORI	The Times	24%	58%	14%	34
16 Feb	Islwyn by-election (Lab hold)					
11 Feb	ICM	The Guardian	31%	49%	17%	18
30 Jan	Gallup	The Daily Telegraph	23.5%	59.5%	13%	36
23 Jan	MORI	The Times	27%	56%	14%	29
14 Jan	ICM	The Guardian	30%	48%	18%	18
13 Jan	Harris	The Sunday Times	25%	60%	12%	35
9 Jan	Gallup	The Daily Telegraph	18.5%	62%	14%	43.5

=== 1994 ===
Date(s) conducted	Pollster	Client	Con	Lab	LD	Lead
19 Dec	MORI	The Times	22%	61%	13%	39
15 Dec	Dudley West by-election (Lab gain from Con)					
9 Dec	ICM	The Observer	26%	53%	17%	27
5 Dec	Gallup	The Daily Telegraph	21.5%	61%	13.5%	39.5
3 Dec	ICM	The Guardian	31%	49%	17%	18
21 Nov	MORI	The Times	24%	55%	17%	31
5 Nov	ICM	The Guardian	31%	49%	16%	18
31 Oct	Gallup	The Daily Telegraph	21.5%	56.5%	17%	35
24 Oct	MORI	The Times	25%	57%	14%	32
8 Oct	ICM	The Guardian	32%	49%	15%	17
3 Oct	Gallup	The Daily Telegraph	25.5%	54%	16.5%	28.5
27 Sep	Gallup	The Daily Telegraph	21%	57.5%	15.5%	36.5
26 Sep	MORI	The Economist	25%	52%	18%	27
26 Sep	MORI	The Times	25%	54%	17%	29
16 Sep	NOP	The Independent	28%	50%	17%	22
10 Sep	ICM	The Guardian	33%	45%	18%	12
5 Sep	Gallup	The Daily Telegraph	22%	56.5%	17%	34.5
26 Aug	NOP	Independent on Sunday	26%	54%	16%	28
22 Aug	MORI	The Times	23%	56%	18%	33
6 Aug	ICM	The Guardian	28%	49%	19%	21
1 Aug	Gallup	The Daily Telegraph	23%	56.5%	14.5%	33.5
21 Jul	Tony Blair is elected leader of the Labour Party					
18 Jul	MORI	The Times	23%	51%	21%	28
9 Jul	ICM	The Guardian	31%	44%	21%	13
4 Jul	Gallup	The Daily Telegraph	26.5%	51%	17.5%	24.5
30 Jun	Monklands East by-election (Lab hold)					
20 Jun	MORI	The Times	24%	52%	20%	28
10 Jun	ICM	The Sunday Express	26.5%	45.5%	19%	19
9 Jun	European Parliament election; Barking by-election (Lab hold), Bradford South by-election (Lab hold), Dagenham by-election (Lab hold), Eastleigh by-election (LD gain from Con) and Newham North East by-election (Lab hold)					
6 Jun	MORI	The Times	23%	50%	22%	27
4 Jun	ICM	The Daily Express	27%	45%	22%	19
31 May	MORI	GMB	22%	46%	22%	24
30 May	Gallup	The Telegraph	21%	54%	21.5%	33
23 May	MORI	The Times	27%	46%	23%	19
21 May	ICM	The Guardian	30%	44%	20%	14
17 May	ICM	The Daily Express	26%	48%	23%	22
14 May	MORI	The Sunday Times	26%	49%	20%	23
12 May	John Smith dies suddenly aged 55; Margaret Beckett is appointed interim Labour leader					
9 May	Gallup	The Daily Telegraph	24.5%	45.5%	25%	20.5
7 May	ICM	The Guardian	29%	44%	24%	17
5 May	Local elections in England and Scotland; Rotherham by-election (Lab hold)					
25 Apr	MORI	The Times	26%	47%	23%	21
20 Apr	NOP	The Independent	26%	48%	21%	22
9 Apr	ICM	The Guardian	30%	42%	22%	12
4 Apr	Gallup	The Daily Telegraph	26.5%	51.5%	17.5%	25
1 Apr	MORI	Evening Standard	28%	46%	22%	18
31 Mar	NOP	Independent on Sunday	26%	50%	20%	24
28 Mar	MORI	The Times	27%	49%	20%	22
12 Mar	ICM	The Guardian	29%	44%	22%	15
28 Feb	Gallup	The Daily Telegraph	25%	48.5%	21%	23.5
28 Feb	MORI	The Times	28%	47%	21%	19
12 Feb	ICM	The Guardian	30%	44%	21%	14
31 Jan	Gallup	The Daily Telegraph	26%	45.5%	23%	19.5
27 Jan	Audience Selection	Sunday Mirror	28%	41%	24%	13
24 Jan	MORI	The Times	28%	48%	20%	20
11 Jan	Gallup	The Daily Telegraph	25.5%	46.5%	20.5%	21
11 Jan	MORI	The Sun	30%	46%	20%	16
8 Jan	ICM	The Guardian	31%	43%	21%	12

=== 1993 ===
Date(s) conducted	Pollster	Client	Con	Lab	LD	Lead
14 Dec	ICM	The Observer	26%	**48%**	23%	22
13 Dec	MORI	The Times	29%	**47%**	20%	18
6 Dec	Gallup	The Daily Telegraph	27%	**48.5%**	20%	21.5
4 Dec	ICM	The Guardian	31%	**42%**	23%	11
22 Nov	MORI	The Times	29%	**47%**	22%	18
13 Nov	NOP	The Sunday Times	27%	**47%**	21%	20
6 Nov	ICM	The Guardian	34%	**38%**	24%	4
1 Nov	Gallup	The Daily Telegraph	24%	**46.5%**	25.5%	22.5
25 Oct	MORI	The Times	29%	**45%**	23%	16
9 Oct	ICM	The Guardian	36%	**39%**	20%	3
9 Oct	ICM	The Sunday Express	30%	**40%**	26%	10
27 Sep	Gallup	The Daily Telegraph	23%	**44.5%**	27%	21.5
24 Sep	ICM	The Sunday Express	27%	**41%**	26%	14
21 Sep	Gallup	The Daily Telegraph	23.5%	**44%**	26.5%	20.5
20 Sep	MORI	The Times	29%	**43%**	25%	14
11 Sep	ICM	The Guardian	29%	**40%**	26%	11
6 Sep	Gallup	The Daily Telegraph	25.5%	**46.5%**	23%	21
23 Aug	MORI	The Times	28%	**42%**	25%	14
7 Aug	ICM	The Guardian	30%	**36%**	27%	6
1 Aug	Gallup	The Daily Telegraph	23%	**44.5%**	27%	21.5
30 Jul	MORI	The Sunday Times	27%	**41%**	28%	14
29 Jul	Christchurch by-election (LD gain from Con)					
26 Jul	MORI	The Times	27%	**44%**	25%	17
23 Jul	MORI	The Sunday Times	34%	**44%**	18%	10
5 Jul	Gallup	The Daily Telegraph	24.5%	**43%**	26.5%	18.5
3 Jul	ICM	The Guardian	32%	**37%**	25%	5
28 Jun	MORI	The Times	28%	**46%**	23%	18
12 Jun	MORI	The Sunday Times	29%	**44%**	22%	15
11 Jun	NOP	Independent on Sunday	27%	**42%**	26%	15
5 Jun	ICM	The Guardian	31%	**38%**	26%	7
31 May	Gallup	The Daily Telegraph	25%	**49%**	23%	24
24 May	MORI	The Times	28%	**44%**	24%	16
19 May	Local elections in Northern Ireland					
8 May	ICM	The Guardian	32%	**38%**	24%	6
6 May	Local elections in England and Wales; Newbury by-election (LD gain from Con)					
3 May	Gallup	The Daily Telegraph	30%	**47%**	17.5%	17
26 Apr	MORI	The Times	32%	**46%**	20%	14
10 Apr	ICM	The Guardian	34%	**39%**	21%	5
1 Apr	Gallup	The Daily Telegraph	30.5%	**49%**	15.5%	18.5
29 Mar	MORI	The Times	32%	**47%**	17%	15
6 Mar	ICM	The Guardian	36%	**41%**	18%	5
1 Mar	Gallup	The Daily Telegraph	32%	**49%**	14%	17
22 Feb	MORI	The Times	34%	**46%**	16%	12
6 Feb	ICM	The Guardian	37%	**39%**	18%	2
1 Feb	Gallup	The Daily Telegraph	33.5%	**46%**	15.5%	12.5
26 Jan	MORI	CCC	38%	**44%**	13%	8
21 Jan	MORI	The Sunday Times	37%	**45%**	14%	8
11 Jan	Gallup	The Daily Telegraph	33.5%	**45.5%**	14.5%	12
9 Jan	ICM	The Guardian	**39%**	37%	18%	2

=== 1992 ===
Date(s) conducted	Pollster	Client	Con	Lab	LD	Lead
15 Dec	MORI	The Sunday Times	34%	**47%**	16%	13
5 Dec	ICM	The Guardian	36%	**41%**	18%	5
1 Dec	MORI	The Sunday Times	34%	**47%**	15%	13
30 Nov	Gallup	The Daily Telegraph	29%	**52%**	14%	23
20 Nov	ICM	The Daily Express	33%	**49%**	14%	16
12 Nov	Harris	The Observer	32%	**51%**	14%	19
8 Nov	Harris	World in Action	30%	**53%**	13%	23
7 Nov	ICM	The Guardian	36%	**40%**	19%	4
2 Nov	Gallup	The Daily Telegraph	32.5%	**50%**	13%	17.5
30 Oct	NOP	Independent on Sunday	34%	**47%**	14%	13
27 Oct	MORI	The Sunday Times	35%	**45%**	15%	10
19 Oct	Gallup	N/A	29%	**51%**	14%	22
12 Oct	Gallup	N/A	36%	**45%**	14%	9
10 Oct	ICM	The Guardian	**38%**	**38%**	19%	Tie
29 Sep	MORI	The Sunday Times	37%	**43%**	16%	6
28 Sep	Gallup	The Daily Telegraph	37%	**44%**	15%	7
21 Sep	Gallup	The Daily Telegraph	37%	**42%**	17%	5
19 Sep	MORI	The Sunday Times	39%	**43%**	15%	4
18 Sep	NOP	Independent on Sunday	39%	**41%**	16%	3
17 Sep	Harris	The Observer	36%	**44%**	16%	8
16 Sep	Black Wednesday					
7 Sep	Gallup	N/A	**43%**	41%	12%	2
5 Sep	ICM	The Guardian	**39%**	35%	19%	4
2 Sep	MORI	The Sunday Times	41%	**44%**	13%	3
21 Aug	MORI	The Times	38%	**44%**	14%	6
14 Aug	NOP	Independent on Sunday	**43%**	39%	14%	4
8 Aug	ICM	The Guardian	**41%**	36%	17%	5
3 Aug	Gallup	N/A	40.5%	**45%**	12%	4.5
28 Jul	MORI	The Sunday Times	39%	**43%**	15%	4
18 Jul	John Smith is elected leader of the Labour Party					
16 Jul	Harris	The Observer	**44%**	38%	15%	6
6 Jul	Gallup	N/A	**42%**	38%	16%	4
4 Jul	ICM	The Guardian	**45%**	36%	15%	9
23 Jun	MORI	The Sunday Times	**42%**	39%	16%	3
18 Jun	Harris	The Observer	**46%**	36%	15%	10
6 Jun	ICM	The Guardian	**45%**	36%	16%	9
1 Jun	Gallup	N/A	**45%**	37%	17%	8
26 May	MORI	The Sunday Times	**43%**	38%	16%	5
17 May	Audience Selection	N/A	**45%**	37%	13%	8
14 May	Harris	The Observer	**46%**	37%	13%	9
9 May	ICM	The Guardian	**45%**	34%	17%	11
8 May	Local elections in England and Scotland					
4 May	Gallup	N/A	**42%**	39%	17%	3
28 Apr	MORI	The Sunday Times	**43%**	38%	16%	5
16 Apr	Harris	The Observer	**44%**	36%	17%	8
12 Apr	Gallup	N/A	**39%**	38%	19%	1
11 Apr	Audience Selection	N/A	**42%**	36%	18%	6
9 Apr 1992	1992 general election (Note: Great Britain results; excludes Northern Ireland.)		**42.8%**	35.2%	18.3%	7.6

== Sub-national poll results ==
=== Scotland ===
All poll data from BBC News.

Date(s) conducted	Pollster	Client	Sample size	Lab	SNP	Con	LD	Lead
1 May 1997	1997 general election		–	45.6%	22.1%	17.5%	13.0%	23.5
26–27 Apr 1997	System 3	The Herald	1,084	50%	26%	14%	9%	25
25–27 Apr 1997	ICM	The Scotsman	1,000	46%	21%	18%	13%	25
24 Apr 1997	NOP	Scot S Times	1,000	49%	24%	14%	12%	25
19–20 Apr 1997	System 3	The Herald	1,080	47%	21%	18%	11%	26
18–20 Apr 1997	ICM	The Scotsman	1,000	47%	21%	18%	11%	26
17 Apr 1997	NOP	Scot S Times	950	47%	28%	15%	8%	19
12–14 Apr 1997	System 3	The Herald	1,000	52%	24%	13%	9%	28
11–13 Apr 1997	ICM	The Scotsman	1,000	42%	23%	19%	15%	19
5–6 Apr 1997	System 3	The Herald	1,081	51%	23%	14%	10%	28
2 Apr 1997	NOP	Scot S Times	844	49%	25%	18%	6%	24
29–31 Mar 1997	ICM	The Scotsman	1,000	47%	22%	20%	9%	25
27–30 Mar 1997	System 3	The Herald	1,003	53%	26%	12%	9%	27
20–24 Mar 1997	System 3	The Herald	1,006	52%	20%	17%	9%	32
9 Apr 1992	1992 general election		–	39.0%	21.5%	25.6%	13.1%	13.4

== Individual constituency poll results ==
=== Christchurch ===
Between the 1992 and 1997 general elections the boundaries of Christchurch were changed. The 1993 poll was based on the old boundaries.

Date(s) conducted	Pollster	Client	Sample size	Con	LD	Lab	Others	Lead
1 May 1997	1997 general election		–	46.4%	42.6%	6.9%	4.1%	3.8
29 Jul 1993	1993 by-election		–	31.4%	62.2%	2.7%	3.6%	30.8
Early Apr 1993 (Note: Poll appears not to exclude "don't know" responses.)	?	Bournemouth Echo	Unknown	28.3%	32.5%	8.3%	–	4.2
9 Apr 1992	1992 general election		–	63.5%	23.6%	12.1%	13.1%	39.9

=== Gloucester ===
Between the 1992 and 1997 general elections the boundaries of Gloucester were changed.

Date(s) conducted	Pollster	Client	Sample size	Con	Lab	LD	Rfr	Others	Lead
1 May 1997	1997 general election		–	35.7%	50.0%	10.5%	2.6%	1.3% UKIP: 0.8% NL: 0.5%	14.3
22–24 Apr 1997	MORI	The Sun	501	35%	46%	14%	4%	1% Grn: 0% (Note: The Green Party was prompted but they did not stand a candidate in the constituency.); Other: 1%	11
8 Apr 1997	MORI	The Sun	672	33%	52%	13%	2%	1% Grn: 0% (Note: The Green Party was prompted but they did not stand a candidate in the constituency.); Other: 1%	19
9 Apr 1992	1992 general election (Note: Notional result)		–	45.5%	36.8%	17.6%	–	–	8.7

=== Loughborough ===
Between the 1992 and 1997 general elections the boundaries of Loughborough were changed.

Date(s) conducted	Pollster	Client	Sample size	Con	Lab	LD	Rfr	Others	Lead
1 May 1997	1997 general election		–	37.7%	48.6%	11.8%	1.9%	–	10.9
19–21 Mar 1997	MORI	Mail on Sunday	602	33%	57%	7%	1%	5% (Note: Includes the SNP and Plaid Cymru (combined 3%) which were both prompted; however, neither party stand candidates in Loughborough, given the constituency is in England and the parties only stand candidates in Scotland and Wales respectively.)	24
9 Apr 1992	1992 general election (Note: Notional result)		–	46.8%	39.8%	11.3%	–	2.2%	7.0

=== Newbury ===
Between the 1992 and 1997 general elections the boundaries of Newbury were changed. The 1993 poll was based on the old boundaries.

Date(s) conducted	Pollster	Client	Sample size	Con	LD	Lab	Others	Lead
1 May 1997	1997 general election		–	37.8%	52.9%	5.5%	3.7%	15.1
6 May 1993	1993 by-election		–	31.4%	65.1%	2.7%	6.0%	38.2
2 May 1993	?	Mail on Sunday	Unknown	38%	50%	–	12%	12
9 Apr 1992	1992 general election		–	55.9%	37.3%	6.0%	0.8%	18.6

=== Tatton ===
Between the 1992 and 1997 general elections the boundaries of Tatton were changed.

Date(s) conducted	Pollster	Client	Sample size	Con	Bell (Ind)	Others	Lead
1 May 1997	1997 general election		–	37.5%	60.2%	2.4% Hill (Ind Con): 0.6% Kinsey (Ind Con): 0.4% MMGOP: 0.3% Alb: 0.3% NL: 0.3% LBvST: 0.2% Nicholas (Ind Con): 0.2% Juc: 0.1%	22.7
9 Apr 1997	MORI	The Sun	525	40%	44%	16% Other: 15% Rfr: 1% (Note: The Referendum Party were prompted in this poll but did not stand a candidate in the constituency.); Grn: <0.5% (Note: The Green Party were prompted in this poll but did not stand a candidate in the constituency.)	4
9 Apr 1992	1992 general election (Note: Notional result)		–	62.2%	–	37.8% Lab: 19.0% LD: 18.1% Other: 0.7%	43.2

=== Wirral South ===
Between the 1992 and 1997 general elections the boundaries of Wirral South were changed.

Date(s) conducted	Pollster	Client	Sample size	Con	Lab	LD	Rfr	Others	Lead
1 May 1997	1997 general election		–	36.4%	50.9%	10.4%	1.6%	0.6% PLA: 0.5% NL: 0.1%	14.5
19–20 Apr 1997	MORI	The Sun	700	36%	54%	8%	1%	1%	18
27 Feb 1997	1997 by-election		–	34.4%	52.6%	10.1%	–	2.9% UKIP: 0.9% Bence (Ind): 0.4% SLP: 0.4% DI: 0.3% Taylor (Ind): 0.3% Samuelson (Ind): 0.3% NL: 0.1% 21CF: 0.1% TAG: 0.1%	18.2
6–7 Feb 1997	MORI	Mail on Sunday	601	35%	55%	9%	<0.5%	1% Grn: <0.5% Other: <0.5%	20
14–16 Jan 1997	MORI	Mail on Sunday	601	37%	54%	8%	<0.5%	1% Grn: <0.5% Other: <0.5%	17
9 Apr 1992	1992 general election (Note: Notional result)		–	50.8%	34.6%	13.1%	–	1.6%	16.2

== Other polling ==
=== Women ===
MORI conducted a voting intention poll surveying women only.

Date(s) conducted	Pollster	Client	Sample size	Con	Lab	LD	SNP / PC	Rfr	Grn	Others	Lead
1 May 1997	1997 general election (MORI)		–	32%	44%	18%	6%				12
26–27 Mar 1997	MORI	Mail on Sunday	800	30%	52%	14%	1%	1%	1%	1%	22
9 Apr 1992	1992 general election (MORI)		–	44%	34%	18%	4%				10

=== Young voters ===
==== First-time voters ====
MORI conducted a voting intention poll surveying 18–27-year-olds who did not vote in 1992 and intended to vote for the first time in 1997.

Date(s) conducted	Pollster	Client	Sample size	Lab	Con	LD	Others	Lead
25–26 Mar 1997	MORI	News of the World	980	62%	22%	9%	7%	40

==== "Thatcher's Children" ====
For Channel 4's programme Thatcher's Children, which premiered on 24 April 1997, MORI conducted a voting intention survey of 18–23-year-olds.

Date(s) conducted	Pollster	Client	Sample size	Lab	Con	LD	Grn	SNP / PC	Rfr	Others	Lead
24 Mar – 5 Apr 1997	MORI	Channel 4	539	56%	23%	11%	4%	4%	2%	<0.5%	33
