= 1994 Dagenham by-election =

UK parliamentary by-election

- 9 June 1994

Constituency of Dagenham
	First party	Second party
	Lab	Con
Candidate	Judith Church	James Fairrie
Party	Labour	Conservative
Popular vote	15,474	2,130
Percentage	72.00%	9.91%
Swing	▲19.74%	▼26.38%
	Third party	Fourth party
	LD	BNP
Candidate	Peter Dunphy	John Tyndall
Party	Liberal Democrats	BNP
Popular vote	1,804	1,511
Percentage	8.39%	7.03%
Swing	▼3.06%	N/A
MP before election
Bryan Gould
Labour
Elected MP
Judith Church
Labour

The 1994 Dagenham by-election, for the Dagenham constituency, was held on 9 June 1994 after Labour Member of Parliament (MP) Bryan Gould resigned the seat. A safe Labour seat, it was won by Judith Church, who retained the seat in 1997.

== Candidates ==
- Judith Church had unsuccessfully run for Labour in the 1992 general election in Stevenage.
- James Fairrie, the candidate for the Conservative Party, had been educated at Downside School, Royal Military Academy Sandhurst and the University of Exeter. Having served with the Royal Hussars he took a job with an export credit agency whilst also serving as a councillor in the London Borough of Wandsworth from 1981 to 1986. He unsuccessfully contested Newham South in the 1987 general election.
- Peter Dunphy, the candidate for the Liberal Democrats, had run unsuccessfully for the party in the 1992 general election for the Hornsey and Wood Green seat. He went on to serve as a councillor for the London Borough of Waltham Forest.
- John Tyndall, the British National Party candidate, was party leader at the time and had previously contested a number of general elections for the BNP. His by-election vote share was the BNP's highest score in a Parliamentary by-election which stood until the Sedgefield by-election of July 2007. It was also the first time ever that the party had saved its deposit in a parliamentary election.
- Peter Compobassi, the UK Independence Party candidate, went on to run for the party in Thurrock in the 1997 general election. A seller of hot chestnuts on London's Oxford Street, he has signed up to be one of the 'Metric Martyrs'.
- Mark Leighton, the Natural Law Party candidate, ran again in Kingston and Surbiton for the 1997 general election.

== Result ==
Dagenham by-election, 1994
Party	Candidate	Votes	%	±%
Labour	Judith Church	15,474	72.00	+19.74
Conservative	James Fairrie	2,130	9.91	−26.38
Liberal Democrats	Peter Dunphy	1,804	8.39	−3.06
BNP	John Tyndall	1,511	7.03	New
UKIP	Peter Compobassi	457	2.13	New
Natural Law	Mark Leighton	116	0.54	New
Majority		13,344	62.09	+46.11
Turnout		21,492		
Labour hold		Swing	+23.1	

== Previous result ==
The result for the previous election was:

1992 general election: Dagenham
Party	Candidate	Votes	%	±%
Labour	Bryan Gould	22,027	52.26	+7.82
Conservative	D Rossiter	15,294	36.29	−2.2
Liberal Democrats	CNH Marquand	4,824	11.45	−5.62
Majority		6,733	15.98	+10.03
Turnout		42,145	70.66	+3.37
Labour hold		Swing	+5.0	
