= Bryan Gould =

New Zealand-British politician and diplomat (born 1939)

Bryan Gould CNZM
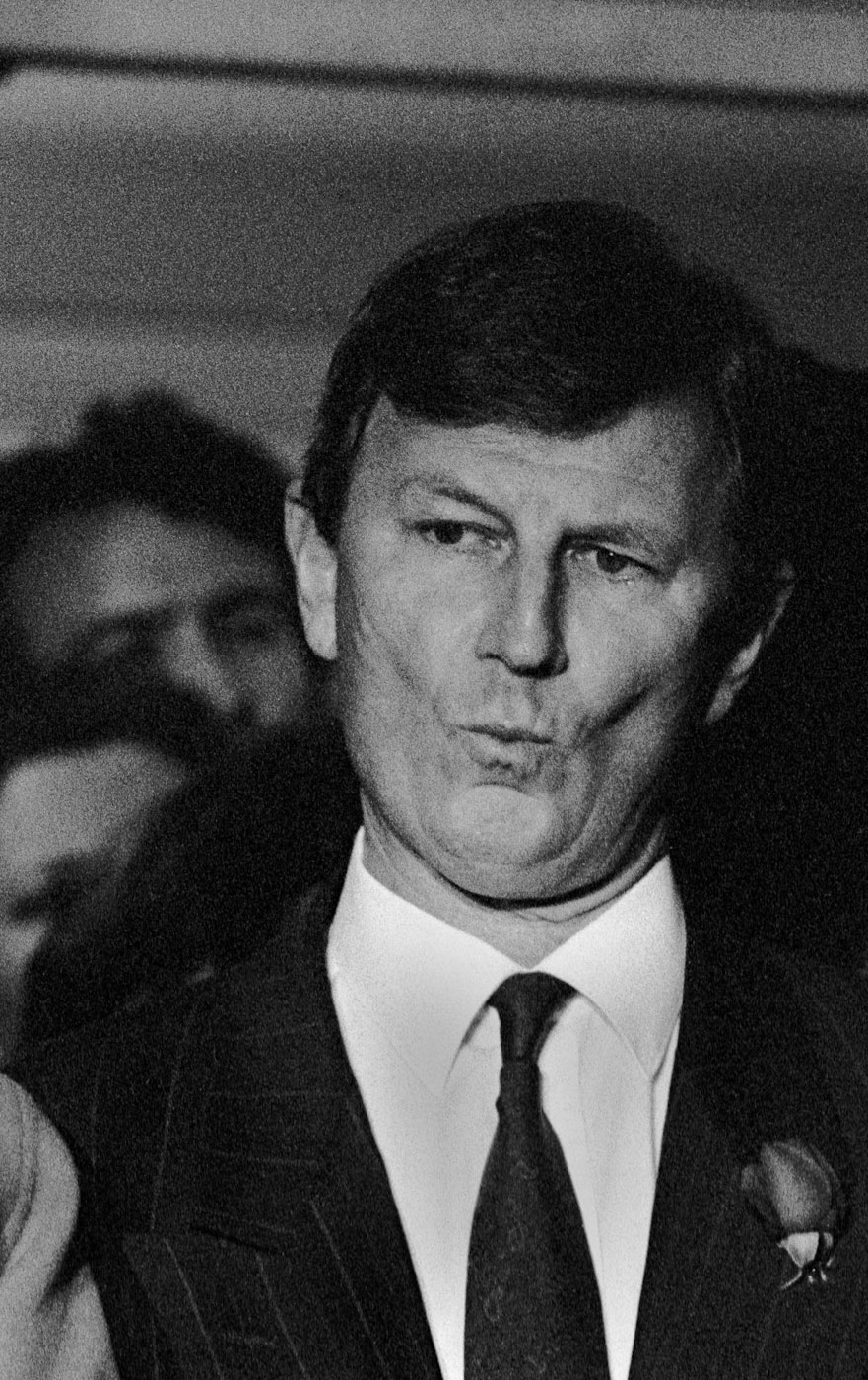
- Gould in 1992

Shadow Secretary of State for National Heritage
- In office 18 July 1992 – 29 September 1992
- Leader: John Smith
- Preceded by: Office Created
- Succeeded by: Ann Clwyd

Shadow Secretary of State for the Environment
- In office 2 November 1989 – 18 July 1992
- Leader: Neil Kinnock
- Preceded by: Jack Cunningham
- Succeeded by: Chris Smith

Shadow Secretary of State for Trade and Industry
- In office 13 July 1987 – 2 November 1989
- Leader: Neil Kinnock
- Preceded by: John Smith
- Succeeded by: Gordon Brown

Shadow Chief Secretary to the Treasury
- In office 30 October 1986 – 13 July 1987
- Leader: Neil Kinnock
- Succeeded by: Gordon Brown

Member of Parliament for Dagenham
- In office 9 June 1983 – 17 May 1994
- Preceded by: John Parker
- Succeeded by: Judith Church

Member of Parliament for Southampton Test
- In office 10 October 1974 – 7 April 1979
- Preceded by: James Hill
- Succeeded by: James Hill

Personal details
- Born: Bryan Charles Gould; 11 February 1939 (age 87) Hāwera, New Zealand
- Party: Labour
- Relations: George Gould (grandfather); Wayne Gould (brother)
- Education: Balliol College, Oxford
- Website: www.bryangould.com

Bryan Charles Gould CNZM (born 11 February 1939) is a New Zealand-born British former politician and diplomat. He served as a Member of Parliament (MP) from 1974 to 1979, and again from 1983 to 1994. He was a member of the Labour Party's shadow cabinet from 1986 to 1992, and stood unsuccessfully for the leadership of the party in 1992.

Gould returned to New Zealand in 1994 to take up the position of vice-chancellor of the University of Waikato, serving until 2004. From 2004 to 2007, he was a director of TVNZ.

== Early life and family ==
Gould was born in Hāwera, New Zealand, on 11 February 1939, the son of Charles Terence Gould and Elsie Gladys May Gould (née Driller). He was educated at Tauranga College from 1951 to 1953, and then Dannevirke High School between 1954 and 1955. He went on to study at Victoria University College from 1956 to 1958, and Auckland University College from 1959 to 1962, graduating BA LLB in 1961, and LLM with first-class honours two years later. He was a New Zealand Rhodes Scholar to Balliol College, Oxford, from 1962. After completing a degree in Law with first-class honours, he joined the British Diplomatic Service in 1964. He then returned to Oxford as a tutorial Fellow in Law at Worcester College alongside Francis Reynolds.

Gould's brother is Wayne Gould, best known for popularising Sudoku outside of Japan. They are descendants of George Gould, a former chairman of the New Zealand Shipping Company. In 1967, Bryan Gould married Gillian Anne Harrigan, and the couple went on to have two children.

== Parliamentary career ==
Having fought the UK seat Southampton Test unsuccessfully in February 1974, Gould was elected Labour MP in October 1974 and held it until 1979. He worked as a television journalist from 1979 to 1983, and was then elected as MP for Dagenham from 1983, holding the seat until he resigned on 17 May 1994.

Gould was a member of Neil Kinnock's shadow cabinet, serving first as Shadow Chief Secretary to the Treasury, then as spokesman on Trade and Industry, the Environment, and later on Heritage. With Peter Mandelson, he ran Labour's campaign for the 1987 general election, which was later described by the BBC as "slick and professional" despite Labour suffering another landslide defeat to the Conservative Party.

In 1992, he founded the Full Employment Forum. Later that year he was defeated in the leadership election to succeed Kinnock following the general election, which Labour had lost to the Conservative Party for the fourth election in succession. John Smith won the leadership contest, but Gould resigned from Smith's shadow cabinet on 27 September 1992 when the shadow cabinet rejected a referendum on the Maastricht Treaty and in protest against Labour's support for the European Exchange Rate Mechanism. He resigned his parliamentary seat in May 1994 when he was about to return to New Zealand.

== After Parliament ==
In July 1994, Gould returned to New Zealand and became Vice-Chancellor of the University of Waikato, serving until his retirement in 2004. In this position, Gould was instrumental in initiating The Great Race, a rowing race for Waikato University against international universities on the Waikato River. The Bryan Gould Cup for the women's eights race is named after him.

In August 1995, Gould was commissioned by the London Evening Standard to write an article on Tony Blair's leadership. However, the newspaper mistakenly published another article under Gould's name, submitted anonymously by Nick Howard, the 19-year-old son of the then Home Secretary, Michael Howard. Howard’s text, which had been received by fax at the same time at the same time as Gould’s, accused Blair of having "given up" his socialist ideals and being "solely interested in power", which would lead to "massive problems in office". The mistake led to an apology from the newspaper's editor, Stewart Steven.

In the 2005 Queen's Birthday Honours, Gould was appointed a Companion of the New Zealand Order of Merit, for services to tertiary education. In October 2006, he was awarded an honorary doctorate by the University of Waikato. He served as a board member of TVNZ between 2004 and 2007.

From 2010 to 2018 Gould Chaired the Eastern Bay Primary Health Alliance

Parliament of the United Kingdom
Preceded by James Hill	Member of Parliament for Southampton Test; October 1974–1979	Succeeded by James Hill
Preceded by John Parker	Member of Parliament for Dagenham; 1983–1994	Succeeded by Judith Church
Party political offices
Preceded by Nick Butler	Chair of the Fabian Society; 1988 – 1989	Succeeded by David Bean
Academic offices
Preceded by Wilf Malcolm	Vice-Chancellor of the University of Waikato; 1994–2004	Succeeded by Roy Crawford
