= Judith Church =

British politician (born 1953)

Member of Parliament for Dagenham
- In office 9 June 1994 – 14 May 2001
- Preceded by: Bryan Gould
- Succeeded by: Jon Cruddas

Personal details
- Born: 19 September 1953 (age 72)
- Party: Labour
- Education: University of Leeds

Judith Church (born 19 September 1953) is a former politician in the United Kingdom.

Having unsuccessfully fought Stevenage in 1992, she was the Labour Member of Parliament for Dagenham from winning the seat at a by-election in June 1994 until she stood down at the 2001 general election.

== Early life ==
She went to St Bernard's Convent School (now called St Bernard's Catholic Grammar School - a grammar school) in Slough. She attended the University of Leeds, gaining a BA in Maths and Philosophy in 1975. After that she went to Huddersfield Polytechnic, Aston University and Thames Valley College. She became a factory inspector. She stood in 1992 in Stevenage.

Parliament of the United Kingdom
| Preceded by Bryan Gould | Member of Parliament for Dagenham; 1994–2001 | Succeeded by Jon Cruddas |
