= Dagenham (constituency) =

Parliamentary constituency in the United Kingdom, 1945–2010

Coordinates: 51.555°N 0.157°E

- Former borough constituency for the House of Commons
- Boundary of Dagenham in Greater London for the 2005 general election
- County: Greater London

1945–2010
- Seats: One
- Created from: Romford
- Replaced by: Dagenham and Rainham

Dagenham was a borough constituency represented in the House of Commons of the UK Parliament that elected one Member of Parliament (MP) by the first past the post system of election. It was replaced at the 2010 general election largely by Dagenham and Rainham.

== Boundaries ==
Map of boundaries 1974–1983

Dates	Local authority	Maps	Wards
1945–1974	Dagenham Urban District (before 1965); London Borough of Barking (after 1965)		Urban District of Hornchurch
1974–1983	London Borough of Barking		Chadwell Heath, Eastbrook, Fanshawe, Heath, River, Valence, and Village.
1983–1997	London Borough of Barking and Dagenham		Alibon, Chadwell Heath, Eastbrook, Fanshawe, Heath, Marks Gate, River, Triptons, Valence, and Village.
1997–2010	London Borough of Barking and Dagenham		Alibon, Chadwell Heath, Eastbrook, Fanshawe, Heath, Marks Gate, River, Triptons, Valence, and Village.

=== 2010 Boundary change ===
Following their review of parliamentary representation in North London, the Boundary Commission for England created a new constituency of Dagenham and Rainham.

== History ==
Before 1945 this Dagenham constituency and surrounding area was part of the Romford constituency. The MP for the predecessor seat since 1935, Labour's John Parker, stood again on each occasion in this smaller successor area, representing it until 1983. Parker was the last serving MP to have been elected before the Second World War, and with 48 years in Parliament, remained the longest-serving Labour MP in history until Dennis Skinner served Bolsover for 49 years. Dagenham was held by Labour since its inception and election predictions always rated it as a safe seat. The constituency shared boundaries with the Dagenham electoral division for election of councillors to the Greater London Council at elections in 1973, 1977 and 1981.

The far-right British National Party (BNP) was active in this area periodically and its support led to some retained deposits by polling more than 5% of the vote on several occasions. Their candidate received nearly 10% of the vote in the 2005 general election and in the 2006 local elections returned 12 councillors to Barking and Dagenham London Borough Council.

== Constituency profile ==
The constituency hosted shrinking skilled manual industry such as the Ford Motor Company works, which downscaled production in 2001, leading to replacement distribution and warehousing businesses as well as local regeneration under the Thames Gateway project from 2005 however higher than national unemployment immediately, including following the seat's abolition. (See the main successor seat, Dagenham and Rainham for statistics.) The largest-polling opposition candidate was Conservative since 1979, with the Liberal Party a greater or equal opponent in elections before that, vying for second place with that party.

== Members of Parliament ==
Election	Member	Party	Notes
1945	John Parker	Labour	Member for Romford (1935–1945)
1983	Bryan Gould	Labour	
1994 by-election	Judith Church	Labour	
2001	Jon Cruddas	Labour	Contested Dagenham and Rainham following redistribution
2010	constituency abolished: see Dagenham and Rainham		

== Election results ==
=== Elections in the 1940s ===
General election 1945: Dagenham
Party	Candidate	Votes	%
Labour	John Parker	36,686	83.7
Conservative	Albert Cooper	7,147	16.3
Majority		29,539	67.4
Turnout		43,833	69.1
Registered electors		63,450	
Labour win (new seat)			

=== Elections in the 1950s ===
General election 1950: Dagenham
Party	Candidate	Votes	%	±%
Labour	John Parker	43,300	72.5	−11.2
Conservative	D. Cook	11,565	19.4	+3.1
Liberal	Ivy Thurston	3,973	6.7	New
Communist	George Bridges	883	1.5	New
Majority		31,735	53.1	−14.3
Turnout		59,721	81.3	+12.2
Registered electors		73,477		
Labour hold		Swing	−7.1	

General election 1951: Dagenham
Party	Candidate	Votes	%	±%
Labour	John Parker	44,908	76.1	+3.6
Conservative	Norman St John-Stevas	14,112	23.9	+4.5
Majority		30,796	52.2	−1.0
Turnout		59,020	79.8	−1.5
Registered electors		73,939		
Labour hold		Swing	−0.5	

General election 1955: Dagenham
Party	Candidate	Votes	%	±%
Labour	John Parker	38,811	73.9	−2.2
Conservative	Roger Gray	13,718	26.1	+2.2
Majority		25,093	47.8	−4.4
Turnout		52,529	68.9	−8.8
Registered electors		76,198		
Labour hold		Swing	−2.2	

General election 1959: Dagenham
Party	Candidate	Votes	%	±%
Labour	John Parker	37,009	69.0	−4.9
Conservative	Andrew Waley	16,626	31.0	+4.9
Majority		20,383	38.0	−9.8
Turnout		53,635	72.5	+3.6
Registered electors		73,968		
Labour hold		Swing	−4.9	

=== Elections in the 1960s ===
General election 1964: Dagenham
Party	Candidate	Votes	%	±%
Labour	John Parker	32,851	64.8	−4.2
Conservative	Giles Currie	9,461	18.7	−12.3
Liberal	Patrick Humphrey	7,301	14.4	New
Communist	Kevin Halpin	1,070	2.1	New
Majority		23,390	46.2	+8.1
Turnout		50,683	71.0	−1.6
Registered electors		71,424		
Labour hold		Swing	+4.1	

General election 1966: Dagenham
Party	Candidate	Votes	%	±%
Labour	John Parker	35,055	74.7	+9.8
Conservative	Giles Currie	10,530	22.4	+3.8
Communist	George Wake	1,373	2.9	+0.8
Majority		24,525	52.2	+6.1
Turnout		46,958	67.4	−3.6
Registered electors		69,671		
Labour hold		Swing	+3.0	

=== Elections in the 1970s ===
General election 1970: Dagenham
Party	Candidate	Votes	%	±%
Labour	John Parker	31,335	70.7	−3.9
Conservative	Hugh McClancy	11,976	27.0	+4.6
Communist	George Wake	982	2.2	−0.7
Majority		19,359	43.7	−8.5
Turnout		44,290	59.1	−8.3
Registered electors		75,005		
Labour hold		Swing	−4.3	

1970 notional result
Party	Vote	%
Labour	30,300	70.8
Conservative	11,600	27.1
Others	900	2.1
Turnout	42,800	58.6
Electorate	73,052	

General election February 1974: Dagenham
Party	Candidate	Votes	%	±%
Labour	John Parker	35,765	72.7	+1.9
Conservative	Archie Hamilton	12,275	24.9	−2.2
Communist	George Wake	1,169	2.4	+0.3
Majority		23,490	47.7	+4.0
Turnout		49,209	71.0	+12.4
Registered electors		69,289		
Labour hold		Swing	+2.0	

General election October 1974: Dagenham
Party	Candidate	Votes	%	±%
Labour	John Parker	29,678	65.2	−7.4
Conservative	Archie Hamilton	7,684	16.9	−8.1
Liberal	G Poole	7,564	16.6	New
Communist	George Wake	569	1.3	−1.1
Majority		21,994	48.3	+0.6
Turnout		45,495	65.0	−6.0
Registered electors		70,004		
Labour hold		Swing	+0.3	

General election 1979: Dagenham
Party	Candidate	Votes	%	±%
Labour	John Parker	24,707	52.6	−12.7
Conservative	Gary Hyams	14,600	31.1	+14.2
Liberal	Mark Long	5,583	11.9	−4.7
National Front	John Roberts	1,553	3.3	New
Communist	Daniel Connor	553	1.2	−0.1
Majority		10,107	21.5	−26.8
Turnout		46,994	69.1	+4.1
Registered electors		67,990		
Labour hold		Swing	+13.4	

1979 notional result
Party	Vote	%
Labour	22,646	52.0
Conservative	13,797	31.7
Liberal	5,174	11.9
Others	1,936	4.4
Turnout	43,553	
Electorate		

=== Elections in the 1980s ===
General election 1983: Dagenham
Party	Candidate	Votes	%	±%
Labour	Bryan Gould	15,665	39.3	−12.7
Conservative	Bob Neill	12,688	31.8	+0.1
SDP	Jacqueline Horne	10,769	27.0	+15.1
National Front	Joe Pearce	645	1.6	−1.7
Communist	D Walshe	141	0.4	−0.8
Majority		2,997	7.5	−12.9
Turnout		39,878	63.4	
Registered electors		62,960		
Labour hold		Swing	−6.4	

General election 1987: Dagenham
Party	Candidate	Votes	%	±%
Labour	Bryan Gould	18,454	44.4	+5.2
Conservative	Bob Neill	15,985	38.5	+6.7
SDP	John Carter	7,088	17.1	−9.9
Majority		2,469	5.9	−1.5
Turnout		41,527	67.3	+3.9
Registered electors		61,714		
Labour hold		Swing	−0.8	

=== Elections in the 1990s ===
General election 1992: Dagenham
Party	Candidate	Votes	%	±%
Labour	Bryan Gould	22,027	52.3	+7.8
Conservative	Don Rossiter	15,294	36.3	−2.2
Liberal Democrats	Charles Marquand	4,824	11.4	−5.6
Majority		6,733	16.0	+10.0
Turnout		42,145	70.7	+3.4
Registered electors		59,645		
Labour hold		Swing	+5.0	

1994 Dagenham by-election
Party	Candidate	Votes	%	±%
Labour	Judith Church	15,474	72.0	+19.7
Conservative	James Fairrie	2,130	9.9	−26.4
Liberal Democrats	Peter Dunphy	1,804	8.4	−3.1
BNP	John Tyndall	1,511	7.0	New
UKIP	Peter Compobassi	457	2.1	New
Natural Law	Mark Leighton	116	0.5	New
Majority		13,344	62.1	+46.1
Turnout		21,492	37.0	−33.7
Registered electors		58,123		
Labour hold		Swing	+23.1	

1992 notional result
Party	Vote	%
Labour	22,499	51.7
Conservative	16,052	36.9
Liberal Democrats	4,992	11.5
Turnout	43,543	69.8
Electorate	62,395	

General election 1997: Dagenham
Party	Candidate	Votes	%	±%
Labour	Judith Church	23,759	65.7	+14.0
Conservative	James P.J. Fairrie	6,705	18.5	−18.3
Liberal Democrats	Thomas Dobrashian	2,704	7.5	−4.0
Referendum	Steven Kraft	1,411	3.9	New
BNP	William Binding	900	2.5	New
Independent	Richard H. Dawson	349	1.0	New
National Democrats	Michael B. Hipperson	183	0.5	New
ProLife Alliance	Kathleen A. Goble	152	0.4	New
Majority		17,054	47.2	+32.4
Turnout		36,163	62.1	−7.7
Registered electors		58,232		
Labour hold		Swing	+16.2	

=== Elections in the 2000s ===
General election 2001: Dagenham
Party	Candidate	Votes	%	±%
Labour	Jon Cruddas	15,784	57.2	−8.5
Conservative	Michael White	7,091	25.7	+7.2
Liberal Democrats	Adrian Gee-Turner	2,820	10.2	+2.7
BNP	David Hill	1,378	5.0	+2.5
Socialist Alliance	Bill Hamilton	262	1.0	New
Socialist Labour	Robert Siggins	245	0.9	New
Majority		8,693	31.5	−15.6
Turnout		27,580	46.5	−15.6
Registered electors		59,340		
Labour hold		Swing	−7.8	

General election 2005: Dagenham
Party	Candidate	Votes	%	±%
Labour	Jon Cruddas	15,446	50.1	−7.1
Conservative	Michael White	7,841	25.4	−0.3
Liberal Democrats	James Kempton	3,106	10.1	−0.2
BNP	Lawrence Rustem	2,870	9.3	+4.3
UKIP	Gerard Batten	1,578	5.1	New
Majority		7,605	24.7	−6.9
Turnout		30,841	51.3	+4.8
Registered electors		60,141		
Labour hold		Swing	−3.4	

== See also ==
- Parliamentary constituencies in London

Parliament of the United Kingdom
Preceded by Vauxhall	Constituency represented by the father of the House; 1979–1983	Succeeded by Cardiff South and Penarth
