= List of MPs for constituencies in Scotland (1997–2001) =

- Colours on map indicate the party allegiance of each constituency's MP.

This is a list of the 72 Members of Parliament (MPs) elected to the House of Commons by Scottish constituencies for the Fifty-Second Parliament of the United Kingdom (1997 to 2001) at the 1997 general election.

== Composition ==
Affiliation	Members
Labour Party	56
Liberal Democrats	10
Scottish National Party	6
Total	72

== List ==
MP	Constituency	Party	Notes
Aberdeen Central	Frank Doran	Labour	
Aberdeen North	Malcolm Savidge	Labour	
Aberdeen South	Anne Begg	Labour	
Airdrie and Shotts	Helen Liddell	Labour	
Angus	Andrew Welsh	SNP	
Argyll and Bute	Ray Michie	Liberal Democrats	
Ayr	Sandra Osborne	Labour	
Banff and Buchan	Alex Salmond	SNP	
Caithness, Sutherland and Easter Ross	Robert Maclennan	Liberal Democrats	
Carrick, Cumnock and Doon Valley	George Foulkes	Labour Co-operative	
Central Fife	Henry McLeish	Labour	
Clydebank and Milngavie	Tony Worthington	Labour	
Clydesdale	Jimmy Hood	Labour	
Coatbridge and Chryston	Tom Clarke	Labour	
Cumbernauld and Kilsyth	Rosemary McKenna	Labour	
Cunninghame North	Brian Wilson	Labour	
Cunninghame South	Brian Donohoe	Labour	
Dumbarton	John McFall	Labour Co-operative	
Dumfries	Russell Brown	Labour	
Dundee East	John McAllion	Labour	
Dundee West	Ernie Ross	Labour	
Dunfermline East	Gordon Brown	Labour	
Dunfermline West	Rachel Squire	Labour	
East Kilbride	Adam Ingram	Labour	
East Lothian	John Home Robertson	Labour	
Eastwood	Jim Murphy	Labour	
Edinburgh Central	Alistair Darling	Labour	
Edinburgh East and Musselburgh	Gavin Strang	Labour	
Edinburgh North and Leith	Malcolm Chisholm	Labour	
Edinburgh Pentlands	Dr Lynda Clark	Labour	
Edinburgh South	Nigel Griffiths	Labour	
Edinburgh West	Donald Gorrie	Liberal Democrat	
Falkirk East	Michael Connarty	Labour	
Falkirk West	Dennis Canavan	Labour	2000 By-election
Galloway and Upper Nithsdale	Alasdair Morgan	SNP	
Glasgow, Anniesland	Donald Dewar	Labour	2000 By-election
Glasgow Baillieston	Jimmy Wray	Labour	
Glasgow Cathcart	John Maxton	Labour	
Glasgow Govan	Mohammad Sarwar	Labour	
Glasgow Kelvin	George Galloway	Labour	
Glasgow Maryhill	Maria Fyfe	Labour	
Glasgow Pollok	Ian Davidson	Labour Co-operative	
Glasgow Rutherglen	Thomas McAvoy	Labour Co-operative	
Glasgow Shettleston	David Marshall	Labour	
Glasgow Springburn	Michael Martin	None - Speaker	
Gordon	Malcolm Bruce	Liberal Democrat	
Greenock and Inverclyde	Norman Godman	Labour	
Hamilton North and Bellshill	John Reid	Labour	
Hamilton South	George Robertson	Labour	1999 By-election
Inverness East, Nairn and Lochaber	David Stewart	Labour	
Kilmarnock and Loudoun	Des Browne	Labour	
Kirkcaldy	Dr Lewis Moonie	Labour Co-operative	
Linlithgow	Sir Tam Dalyell	Labour	
Livingston	Robin Cook	Labour	
Midlothian	Eric Clarke	Labour	
Moray	Margaret Ewing	SNP	
Motherwell and Wishaw	Frank Roy	Labour	
North East Fife	Sir Menzies Campbell	Liberal Democrat	
North Tayside	John Swinney	SNP	
Ochil	Martin O'Neill	Labour	
Orkney and Shetland	Jim Wallace	Liberal Democrat	
Paisley North	Irene Adams	Labour	
Paisley South	Gordon McMaster	Labour	1997 By-election
Perth	Roseanna Cunningham	SNP	
Ross, Skye and Inverness West	Charles Kennedy	Liberal Democrat	
Roxburgh and Berwickshire	Archy Kirkwood	Liberal Democrat	
Stirling	Anne McGuire	Labour	Lord Commissioner of the Treasury (2001–2002)
Strathkelvin and Bearsden	Sam Galbraith	Labour	
Tweeddale, Ettrick and Lauderdale	Michael Moore	Liberal Democrat	
West Aberdeenshire and Kincardine	Sir Robert Smith	Liberal Democrat	
West Renfrewshire	Tommy Graham	Labour	
Western Isles	Calum Macdonald	Labour	

== By-elections ==
- 1997 Paisley South By-election, Douglas Alexander, Labour
- 1999 Hamilton South By-election, Bill Tynan, Labour
- 2000 Glasgow Anniesland By-election, John Robertson, Labour
- 2000 Falkirk West By-election, Eric Joyce, Labour

== See also ==
- Lists of MPs for constituencies in Scotland
