= Results of the 2004 European Parliament election in the United Kingdom =

1999 election of members of the European parliament for the United Kingdom

Results of the 2004 election by Westminster constituency.

The United Kingdom's component of the 2004 European Parliament election was held on Thursday 10 June 2004. They were the first nationwide poll since the 2001 United Kingdom general election.

In England and Wales the votes were counted in each local authority, and the results were amalgamated for the regional lists. The votes in Scotland were counted in each Westminster constituency. These European elections were the second to be fought under proportional representation within Great Britain. The seats were allocated according to the d'Hondt system.

The election saw poor results for the Labour government and the opposition Conservative Party. These elections showed strength for the UK Independence Party who doubled their support. The Liberal Democrats fell to fourth place. The Green Party of England and Wales and the Scottish National Party stabilised winning two seats each and Plaid Cymru held its one seat. The British National Party and the Respect Party won a sizeable number of the votes but no seats.

The results in the Northern Ireland constituency were counted as one constituency using the single transferable vote.

== East Midlands ==
European Parliament election, 2004 (East Midlands)

Local authority	Con		Lab		Lib Dem		UKIP		Green		BNP		Respect		Others		Total	Electorate		Party won in 2004
Local authority	#	%	#	%	#	%	#	%	#	%	#	%	#	%	#	%	Total	Electorate	Turnout	Party won in 2004
Amber Valley	10,674	24.25	10,545	23.96	3,920	8.91	12,931	29.38	2,324	5.28	3,341	7.59	197	0.45	80	0.18	44,012	94,559	46.50%	UKIP
Ashfield	5,677	16.83	9,707	28.77	3,291	9.75	10,196	30.22	1,645	4.88	2,880	8.54	181	0.54	161	0.48	33,738	86,424	39.00%	UKIP
Bassetlaw	9,022	24.93	9,867	27.26	3,511	9.70	9,794	27.06	1,687	4.66	2,085	5.76	124	0.34	101	0.28	36,191	82,901	43.70%	Labour
Blaby	9,147	30.18	4,427	14.61	3,653	12.05	8,381	27.65	1,686	5.56	2,794	9.22	173	0.57	48	0.16	30,309	70,091	43.20%	Conservative
Bolsover	3,187	14.35	8,133	36.62	2,200	9.90	5,603	25.23	959	4.32	1,925	8.67	136	0.61	69	0.31	22,212	57,527	38.60%	Labour
Boston	5,570	26.85	3,029	14.60	1,815	8.75	7,797	37.58	616	2.97	1,817	8.76	70	0.34	34	0.16	20,748	44,426	46.70%	UKIP
Broxtowe	10,197	25.85	8,472	21.47	5,829	14.77	9,412	23.86	2,350	5.96	2,821	7.15	292	0.74	79	0.20	39,452	81,018	48.70%	Conservative
Charnwood	15,305	28.18	9,879	18.19	6,698	12.33	15,049	27.71	3,058	5.63	3,678	6.77	561	1.03	88	0.16	54,316	122,292	44.40%	Conservative
Chesterfield	3,652	10.87	9,118	27.13	9,536	28.38	7,224	21.50	1,541	4.59	2,157	6.42	298	0.89	81	0.24	33,607	78,498	42.80%	Liberal Democrat
Corby	2,971	20.24	4,695	31.98	1,588	10.82	3,485	23.74	636	4.33	1,104	7.52	155	1.06	46	0.31	14,680	39,537	37.10%	Labour
Daventry	10,306	38.58	3,954	14.80	3,186	11.93	6,163	23.07	1,589	5.95	1,348	5.05	118	0.44	50	0.19	26,714	57,205	46.70%	Conservative
Derby	14,989	19.38	21,070	27.25	11,410	14.75	19,326	24.99	3,216	4.16	4,697	6.07	2,505	3.24	117	0.15	77,330	166,046	46.60%	Labour
Derbyshire Dales	9,541	33.64	4,516	15.92	4,176	14.72	6,705	23.64	2,074	7.31	1,110	3.91	203	0.72	40	0.14	28,365	55,819	50.80%	Conservative
East Lindsey	14,601	31.81	7,111	15.49	5,700	12.42	13,030	28.39	2,300	5.01	2,813	6.13	206	0.45	133	0.29	45,894	103,643	44.30%	Conservative
East Northamptonshire	9,203	34.59	4,285	16.11	2,847	10.70	7,217	27.13	1,417	5.33	1,469	5.52	103	0.39	65	0.24	26,606	60,343	44.10%	Conservative
Erewash	9,243	24.07	7,993	20.82	3,927	10.23	11,790	30.70	1,866	4.86	3,292	8.57	201	0.52	88	0.23	38,400	83,379	46.10%	UKIP
Gedling	10,607	26.60	8,193	20.55	4,713	11.82	10,709	26.86	2,442	6.12	2,753	6.90	369	0.93	88	0.22	39,874	87,192	45.70%	UKIP
Harborough	10,825	36.94	3,409	11.63	4,585	15.65	6,896	23.53	1,756	5.99	1,670	5.70	115	0.39	48	0.16	29,304	62,301	47.00%	Conservative
High Peak	7,674	24.87	6,646	21.54	4,679	15.16	7,245	23.48	2,592	8.40	1,509	4.89	450	1.46	63	0.20	30,858	68,714	44.90%	Conservative
Hinckley and Bosworth	10,379	29.99	5,499	15.89	4,369	12.63	9,622	27.81	1,837	5.31	2,643	7.64	174	0.50	80	0.23	34,603	80,461	43.00%	Conservative
Kettering	9,169	32.55	5,487	19.48	3,067	10.89	7,062	25.07	1,427	5.07	1,692	6.01	194	0.69	67	0.24	28,165	65,484	43.00%	Conservative
Leicester	14,873	18.58	22,061	27.55	10,690	13.35	15,252	19.05	4,802	6.00	4,858	6.07	7,375	9.21	152	0.19	80,063	200,312	40.00%	Labour
Lincoln	5,840	23.69	6,229	25.27	3,320	13.47	6,001	24.34	1,381	5.60	1,575	6.39	217	0.88	87	0.35	24,650	59,371	41.50%	Labour
Mansfield	5,048	16.49	8,705	28.44	3,128	10.22	9,735	31.81	1,453	4.75	2,081	6.80	174	0.57	284	0.93	30,608	76,731	39.90%	Labour
Melton	5,559	32.88	2,373	14.04	1,828	10.81	5,346	31.62	847	5.01	853	5.05	68	0.40	31	0.18	16,905	38,706	43.70%	Conservative
Newark and Sherwood	10,803	29.48	7,601	20.74	4,543	12.40	9,488	25.89	1,953	5.33	1,914	5.22	146	0.40	195	0.53	36,643	82,176	44.60%	Conservative
North East Derbyshire	6,575	19.16	9,832	28.66	4,318	12.59	8,808	25.67	1,762	5.14	2,741	7.99	195	0.57	79	0.23	34,310	75,599	45.40%	Labour
North Kesteven	11,510	31.75	5,207	14.36	4,804	13.25	10,865	29.97	1,720	4.74	1,912	5.27	141	0.39	94	0.26	36,253	75,538	48.00%	Conservative
North West Leicestershire	7,704	25.66	6,976	23.24	3,178	10.59	7,853	26.16	1,613	5.37	2,495	8.31	122	0.41	78	0.26	30,019	69,604	43.10%	UKIP
Northampton	15,171	26.76	10,671	18.82	8,667	15.29	13,959	24.62	3,129	5.52	4,291	7.57	725	1.28	89	0.16	56,702	147,704	38.40%	Conservative
Nottingham	13,206	19.17	18,755	27.23	8,987	13.05	15,935	23.14	4,681	6.80	4,793	6.96	2,343	3.40	177	0.26	68,877	191,853	35.90%	Labour
Oadby and Wigston	5,134	26.36	2,574	13.21	3,673	18.86	5,354	27.49	817	4.19	1,526	7.83	371	1.90	29	0.15	19,478	42,864	45.40%	UKIP
Rushcliffe	13,735	33.58	6,685	16.35	6,068	14.84	9,016	22.05	3,203	7.83	1,730	4.23	381	0.93	80	0.20	40,898	81,067	50.40%	Conservative
Rutland	4,752	37.38	1,601	12.59	1,674	13.17	3,365	26.47	822	6.47	428	3.37	48	0.38	22	0.17	12,712	26,527	47.90%	Conservative
South Derbyshire	8,425	29.54	6,884	24.14	2,864	10.04	6,339	22.23	1,136	3.98	2,728	9.57	92	0.32	52	0.18	28,520	65,830	43.30%	Conservative
South Holland	9,530	34.55	3,823	13.86	2,661	9.65	8,274	30.00	1,084	3.93	2,036	7.38	112	0.41	60	0.22	27,580	63,905	43.20%	Conservative
South Kesteven	13,899	31.61	6,311	14.35	5,199	11.82	13,567	30.85	2,593	5.90	2,139	4.86	178	0.40	90	0.20	43,976	94,123	46.70%	Conservative
South Northamptonshire	10,749	37.72	3,885	13.63	3,620	12.70	6,907	24.24	1,815	6.37	1,300	4.56	154	0.54	70	0.25	28,500	61,409	46.40%	Conservative
Wellingborough	7,212	30.58	4,312	18.28	2,288	9.70	7,038	29.84	1,183	5.02	1,334	5.66	174	0.74	43	0.18	23,584	52,978	44.50%	Conservative
West Lindsey	9,695	31.23	4,398	14.17	5,754	18.53	7,759	24.99	1,621	5.22	1,528	4.92	168	0.54	124	0.40	31,047	65,862	47.10%	Conservative

== East of England ==
European Parliament election, 2004 (East of England)

Local authority	Con		Lab		Lib Dem		UKIP		Green		BNP		Respect		Others		Total	Electorate		Party won in 2004
Local authority	#	%	#	%	#	%	#	%	#	%	#	%	#	%	#	%	Total	Electorate	Turnout	Party won in 2004
Babergh	7,424	29.90	2,936	11.82	3,617	14.57	6,193	24.94	1,433	5.77	798	3.21	114	0.46	2,317	9.33	24,832	67,061	37.00%	Conservative
Basildon	12,283	30.50	7,668	19.04	3,691	9.17	8,515	21.15	1,763	4.38	3,798	9.43	262	0.65	2,286	5.68	40,266	127,330	31.60%	Conservative
Bedford	12,272	28.49	8,527	19.79	6,710	15.58	7,300	16.95	2,073	4.81	1,492	3.46	429	1.00	4,276	9.93	43,079	108,302	39.80%	Conservative
Braintree	11,249	31.77	6,008	16.97	3,925	11.08	7,775	21.96	2,358	6.66	1,471	4.15	149	0.42	2,474	6.99	35,409	103,923	34.10%	Conservative
Breckland	9,723	30.06	4,361	13.48	3,020	9.34	8,259	25.53	1,751	5.41	1,387	4.29	115	0.36	3,733	11.54	32,349	91,770	35.30%	Conservative
Brentwood	8,506	36.39	2,299	9.84	2,979	12.74	5,297	22.66	1,118	4.78	877	3.75	97	0.41	2,202	9.42	23,375	53,747	43.50%	Conservative
Broadland	11,114	29.63	5,904	15.74	4,906	13.08	6,837	18.23	2,036	5.43	1,452	3.87	108	0.29	5,146	13.72	37,503	96,512	38.90%	Conservative
Broxbourne	8,286	36.48	3,176	13.98	1,591	7.00	5,175	22.78	876	3.86	2,292	10.09	137	0.60	1,180	5.20	22,713	64,016	35.50%	Conservative
Cambridge	6,199	19.90	6,692	21.48	8,044	25.82	3,139	10.08	3,387	10.87	400	1.28	532	1.71	2,758	8.85	31,151	87,149	35.70%	Liberal Democrat
Castle Point	7,421	30.78	4,433	18.39	1,485	6.16	6,805	28.22	959	3.98	1,569	6.51	134	0.56	1,306	5.42	24,112	68,814	35.00%	Conservative
Chelmsford	12,937	31.89	5,071	12.50	6,929	17.08	8,596	21.19	2,082	5.13	1,766	4.35	269	0.66	2,917	7.19	40,567	125,350	32.40%	Conservative
Colchester	11,961	28.43	6,017	14.30	7,030	16.71	8,929	21.22	2,664	6.33	1,395	3.32	316	0.75	3,761	8.94	42,073	120,691	34.90%	Conservative
Dacorum	12,027	33.39	6,300	17.49	5,514	15.31	6,164	17.11	2,027	5.63	1,483	4.12	244	0.68	2,264	6.28	36,023	105,335	34.20%	Conservative
East Cambridgeshire	5,653	31.87	1,976	11.14	3,083	17.38	3,776	21.29	1,101	6.21	515	2.90	94	0.53	1,540	8.68	17,738	55,869	31.70%	Conservative
East Hertfordshire	11,990	35.30	4,227	12.44	4,813	14.17	7,013	20.65	2,203	6.49	1,196	3.52	189	0.56	2,335	6.87	33,966	96,477	35.20%	Conservative
Epping Forest	11,854	34.83	3,868	11.36	4,001	11.75	7,597	22.32	1,614	4.74	2,567	7.54	227	0.67	2,310	6.79	34,038	91,243	37.30%	Conservative
Fenland	7,744	36.28	3,035	14.22	2,086	9.77	4,821	22.58	665	3.12	1,094	5.12	92	0.43	1,810	8.48	21,347	66,404	32.10%	Conservative
Forest Heath	3,710	33.56	1,452	13.13	1,001	9.05	3,038	27.48	432	3.91	438	3.96	46	0.42	938	8.48	11,055	34,646	31.90%	Conservative
Great Yarmouth	7,094	27.95	5,975	23.54	1,985	7.82	5,219	20.56	1,076	4.24	1,500	5.91	103	0.41	2,427	9.56	25,379	67,102	37.80%	Conservative
Harlow	4,584	22.31	5,190	25.26	2,285	11.12	4,308	20.97	996	4.85	1,216	5.92	390	1.90	1,576	7.67	20,545	55,992	36.70%	Labour
Hertsmere	10,444	40.16	4,192	16.12	2,917	11.22	4,302	16.54	1,281	4.93	1,137	4.37	216	0.83	1,520	5.84	26,009	66,144	39.30%	Conservative
Huntingdonshire	18,963	38.96	4,761	9.78	7,730	15.88	8,902	18.29	2,157	4.43	1,560	3.20	213	0.44	4,391	9.02	48,677	117,870	41.30%	Conservative
Ipswich	8,555	27.38	7,571	24.23	4,219	13.50	5,158	16.51	1,693	5.42	1,497	4.79	194	0.62	2,362	7.56	31,249	89,288	35.00%	Conservative
Kings Lynn and West Norfolk	13,304	35.50	5,891	15.72	3,502	9.35	7,935	21.18	1,645	4.39	1,743	4.65	161	0.43	3,291	8.78	37,472	109,729	34.10%	Conservative
Luton	7,841	20.31	10,077	26.10	6,627	17.16	6,324	16.38	1,432	3.71	1,826	4.73	2,347	6.08	2,134	5.53	38,608	136,930	28.20%	Labour
Maldon	5,653	35.15	2,013	12.52	1,723	10.71	3,837	23.86	938	5.83	663	4.12	73	0.45	1,181	7.34	16,081	45,136	35.60%	Conservative
Mid Bedfordshire	12,346	35.11	4,571	13.00	4,427	12.59	7,221	20.54	1,829	5.20	1,503	4.27	128	0.36	3,137	8.92	35,162	95,287	36.90%	Conservative
Mid Suffolk	8,685	31.68	3,314	12.09	3,373	12.30	5,833	21.28	2,330	8.50	968	3.53	101	0.37	2,810	10.25	27,414	69,348	39.50%	Conservative
North Hertfordshire	12,605	33.75	6,669	17.86	5,861	15.69	5,717	15.31	2,344	6.28	997	2.67	217	0.58	2,934	7.86	37,344	93,885	39.80%	Conservative
North Norfolk	10,135	30.42	3,280	9.85	7,370	22.12	6,305	18.93	1,493	4.48	973	2.92	96	0.29	3,662	10.99	33,314	80,507	41.40%	Conservative
Norwich	5,441	16.08	8,505	25.13	6,478	19.14	3,645	10.77	4,406	13.02	1,029	3.04	333	0.98	4,005	11.83	33,842	95,255	35.50%	Labour
Peterborough	14,013	31.62	8,290	18.71	5,002	11.29	7,091	16.00	1,705	3.85	2,342	5.28	2,119	4.78	3,754	8.47	44,316	116,934	37.90%	Conservative
Rochford	8,090	36.65	2,784	12.61	2,158	9.78	5,004	22.67	1,094	4.96	1,330	6.02	112	0.51	1,504	6.81	22,076	62,873	35.10%	Conservative
South Bedfordshire	10,530	33.05	5,114	16.05	4,082	12.81	6,699	21.03	1,502	4.71	1,556	4.88	180	0.56	2,197	6.90	31,860	86,940	36.60%	Conservative
South Cambridgeshire	14,717	32.14	5,867	12.81	8,841	19.31	7,818	17.07	2,986	6.52	948	2.07	294	0.64	4,317	9.43	45,788	102,361	44.70%	Conservative
South Norfolk	10,853	30.66	4,002	11.30	6,493	18.34	6,044	17.07	2,072	5.85	1,082	3.06	132	0.37	4,725	13.35	35,403	90,733	39.00%	Conservative
Southend	14,090	33.18	6,093	14.35	4,925	11.60	9,319	21.95	2,421	5.70	2,112	4.97	363	0.85	3,139	7.39	42,462	122,098	34.80%	Conservative
St Albans	13,535	31.99	6,685	15.80	8,913	21.07	5,735	13.56	2,723	6.44	942	2.23	495	1.17	3,276	7.74	42,304	95,891	44.10%	Conservative
St Edmundsbury	8,372	31.93	3,592	13.70	3,093	11.80	6,077	23.18	1,469	5.60	961	3.67	125	0.48	2,532	9.66	26,221	75,737	34.60%	Conservative
Stevenage	4,984	22.36	6,298	28.26	3,264	14.64	3,013	13.52	1,187	5.33	925	4.15	170	0.76	2,448	10.98	22,289	57,146	39.00%	Labour
Suffolk Coastal	11,982	32.53	4,293	11.65	4,946	13.43	7,719	20.95	2,354	6.39	1,215	3.30	163	0.44	4,166	11.31	36,838	92,764	39.70%	Conservative
Tendring	10,062	26.54	6,089	16.06	3,614	9.53	12,463	32.88	1,568	4.14	1,464	3.86	178	0.47	2,468	6.51	37,906	106,938	35.40%	UKIP
Three Rivers	8,356	33.51	3,239	12.99	5,082	20.38	4,160	16.68	1,250	5.01	966	3.87	216	0.87	1,667	6.69	24,936	60,499	41.20%	Conservative
Thurrock	7,628	24.76	8,098	26.29	2,245	7.29	6,201	20.13	1,270	4.12	3,419	11.10	178	0.58	1,767	5.74	30,806	106,708	28.90%	Labour
Uttlesford	7,265	35.92	1,702	8.41	3,282	16.23	4,150	20.52	1,282	6.34	488	2.41	72	0.36	1,987	9.82	20,228	54,157	37.40%	Conservative
Watford	5,299	22.74	4,436	19.04	6,020	25.83	3,137	13.46	1,636	7.02	813	3.49	560	2.40	1,402	6.02	23,303	59,625	39.10%	Liberal Democrat
Waveney	8,322	25.60	6,440	19.81	3,047	9.37	6,922	21.30	1,840	5.66	1,315	4.05	195	0.60	4,421	13.60	32,502	88,421	36.80%	Conservative
Welwyn Hatfield	9,425	33.31	5,948	21.02	3,449	12.19	4,673	16.52	1,547	5.47	1,077	3.81	226	0.80	1,949	6.89	28,294	70,273	40.30%	Conservative

== London ==
European Parliament election, 2004 (London)

Local authority	Con		Lab		Lib Dem		UKIP		Green		BNP		Respect		Others		Total	Electorate		Party won in 2004
Local authority	#	%	#	%	#	%	#	%	#	%	#	%	#	%	#	%	Total	Electorate	Turnout	Party won in 2004
Barking and Dagenham	5,384	15.13	9,947	27.95	3,063	8.61	7,500	21.08	1,479	4.16	5,266	14.80	1,052	2.96	1,893	5.32	35,584	116,551	30.50%	Labour
Barnet	33,298	37.05	21,478	23.90	11,895	13.23	9,422	10.48	6,649	7.40	2,212	2.46	2,553	2.84	2,374	2.64	89,881	220,961	40.70%	Conservative
Bexley	21,167	31.80	12,566	18.88	6,980	10.49	14,810	22.25	2,898	4.35	5,228	7.85	559	0.84	2,356	3.54	66,564	170,093	39.10%	Conservative
Brent	14,859	24.22	20,504	33.43	10,810	17.62	3,910	6.37	4,500	7.34	1,071	1.75	3,372	5.50	2,317	3.78	61,343	166,085	36.90%	Labour
Bromley	36,039	37.20	13,109	13.53	16,328	16.85	17,357	17.92	5,767	5.95	4,181	4.32	1,052	1.09	3,051	3.15	96,884	225,021	43.10%	Conservative
Camden	10,717	21.71	12,892	26.11	9,612	19.47	3,658	7.41	7,156	14.49	1,103	2.23	3,185	6.45	1,048	2.12	49,371	135,834	36.30%	Labour
City of London	707	31.69	443	19.86	410	18.38	242	10.85	258	11.56	47	2.11	83	3.72	41	1.84	2,231	6,034	37.00%	Conservative
Croydon	28,650	31.92	20,887	23.27	11,652	12.98	13,320	14.84	5,659	6.31	3,231	3.60	2,437	2.72	3,910	4.36	89,746	240,556	37.30%	Conservative
Ealing	18,485	23.08	25,964	32.41	11,929	14.89	7,743	9.67	6,553	8.18	2,167	2.71	4,419	5.52	2,842	3.55	80,102	207,274	38.60%	Labour
Enfield	21,823	31.26	17,564	25.16	7,686	11.01	9,788	14.02	4,413	6.32	3,573	5.12	2,463	3.53	2,508	3.59	69,818	188,374	37.10%	Conservative
Greenwich	10,428	19.19	15,780	29.05	7,210	13.27	8,470	15.59	4,694	8.64	3,908	7.19	1,498	2.76	2,341	4.31	54,329	155,809	34.90%	Labour
Hackney	5,866	14.23	14,253	34.58	5,538	13.44	2,338	5.67	6,837	16.59	825	2.00	4,026	9.77	1,530	3.71	41,213	122,609	33.60%	Labour
Hammersmith and Fulham	13,784	33.60	9,882	24.09	5,955	14.52	3,733	9.10	4,148	10.11	1,066	2.60	1,347	3.28	1,108	2.70	41,023	107,222	38.30%	Conservative
Haringey	8,122	15.56	17,202	32.95	9,866	18.90	3,212	6.15	7,464	14.30	768	1.47	4,046	7.75	1,534	2.94	52,214	145,853	35.80%	Labour
Harrow	21,627	34.25	16,789	26.59	8,372	13.26	6,928	10.97	3,539	5.60	1,735	2.75	1,923	3.05	2,238	3.54	63,151	157,637	40.10%	Conservative
Havering	21,501	32.56	11,154	16.89	5,415	8.20	15,832	23.98	2,962	4.49	6,309	9.55	537	0.81	2,324	3.52	66,034	172,531	38.30%	Conservative
Hillingdon	20,457	31.35	14,192	21.75	7,679	11.77	11,424	17.51	3,282	5.03	4,605	7.06	1,445	2.21	2,173	3.33	65,257	179,662	36.30%	Conservative
Hounslow	12,632	24.21	15,064	28.87	7,728	14.81	6,420	12.30	3,813	7.31	2,371	4.54	2,519	4.83	1,639	3.14	52,186	158,348	33.00%	Labour
Islington	5,241	13.68	10,657	27.82	8,067	21.06	3,495	9.13	6,360	16.61	1,091	2.85	2,258	5.90	1,132	2.96	38,301	119,416	32.10%	Labour
Kensington and Chelsea	14,709	44.34	5,319	16.03	4,420	13.32	3,132	9.44	2,834	8.54	597	1.80	1,400	4.22	762	2.30	33,173	86,317	38.40%	Conservative
Kingston upon Thames	12,543	29.10	6,556	15.21	11,415	26.48	5,730	13.29	3,336	7.74	1,195	2.77	800	1.86	1,533	3.56	43,108	98,836	43.60%	Conservative
Lambeth	10,378	16.45	20,225	32.07	12,358	19.59	4,647	7.37	8,802	13.95	1,051	1.67	3,075	4.88	2,539	4.03	63,075	191,889	32.90%	Labour
Lewisham	9,663	16.28	19,407	32.69	9,200	15.50	6,452	10.87	7,489	12.61	2,166	3.65	2,210	3.72	2,784	4.69	59,371	168,812	35.20%	Labour
Merton	14,578	27.35	14,692	27.56	7,195	13.50	6,786	12.73	4,427	8.30	2,100	3.94	1,651	3.10	1,881	3.53	53,310	130,276	40.90%	Labour
Newham	6,924	12.73	18,078	33.23	4,626	8.50	4,370	8.03	2,876	5.29	2,414	4.44	11,784	21.66	3,324	6.11	54,396	166,257	32.70%	Labour
Redbridge	20,536	29.63	16,908	24.39	8,063	11.63	9,561	13.79	4,092	5.90	2,920	4.21	4,824	6.96	2,408	3.47	69,312	176,572	39.30%	Conservative
Richmond upon Thames	18,803	32.88	8,156	14.26	14,976	26.18	6,193	10.83	5,998	10.49	1,174	2.05	838	1.47	1,056	1.85	57,194	119,503	47.90%	Conservative
Southwark	8,000	13.69	18,518	31.68	13,903	23.78	5,205	8.90	6,478	11.08	1,830	3.13	2,053	3.51	2,470	4.23	58,457	167,708	34.90%	Labour
Sutton	15,436	30.35	6,328	12.44	12,329	24.24	8,973	17.64	2,638	5.19	2,379	4.68	635	1.25	2,139	4.21	50,857	131,941	38.50%	Conservative
Tower Hamlets	9,523	18.63	10,103	19.76	8,531	16.68	4,195	8.20	4,194	8.20	2,362	4.62	10,611	20.75	1,611	3.15	51,130	139,172	36.70%	Respect
Waltham Forest	11,126	19.61	13,555	23.89	8,881	15.65	7,308	12.88	5,506	9.70	2,741	4.83	5,468	9.64	2,163	3.81	56,748	155,803	36.40%	Labour
Wandsworth	25,212	33.18	19,343	25.46	10,617	13.97	6,227	8.20	7,994	10.52	1,490	1.96	3,007	3.96	2,089	2.75	75,979	202,228	37.60%	Conservative
Westminster	16,723	37.91	9,069	20.56	6,081	13.79	4,252	9.64	3,891	8.82	976	2.21	2,045	4.64	1,070	2.43	44,107	123,773	35.60%	Conservative

== North East of England ==
European Parliament election, 2004 (North East England)

Local authority	Con		Lab		Lib Dem		UKIP		Green		BNP		Respect		Others		Total	Electorate		Party won in 2004
Local authority	#	%	#	%	#	%	#	%	#	%	#	%	#	%	#	%	Total	Electorate	Turnout	Party won in 2004
Alnwick	2,955	24.12	1,604	13.09	4,737	38.66	1,468	11.98	620	5.06	383	3.13	77	0.63	408	3.33	12,252	25,422	48.20%	Liberal Democrat
Berwick-upon-Tweed	2,625	27.76	1,106	11.70	3,029	32.03	1,308	13.83	507	5.36	373	3.94	112	1.18	396	4.19	9,456	21,281	44.40%	Liberal Democrat
Blyth Valley	3,719	14.81	9,680	38.56	4,925	19.62	2,999	11.95	1,078	4.29	1,564	6.23	152	0.61	987	3.93	25,104	63,454	39.60%	Labour
Castle Morpeth	5,724	30.06	3,893	20.45	4,485	23.56	2,296	12.06	1,146	6.02	667	3.50	99	0.52	730	3.83	19,040	38,538	49.40%	Conservative
Chester-le-Street	2,827	16.07	7,036	40.00	2,739	15.57	2,009	11.42	816	4.64	1,021	5.80	103	0.59	1,039	5.91	17,590	43,100	40.80%	Labour
Darlington	8,600	28.10	9,189	30.03	4,524	14.78	3,962	12.95	1,574	5.14	1,585	5.18	284	0.93	885	2.89	30,603	75,613	40.50%	Labour
Derwentside	3,736	13.39	11,794	42.26	4,383	15.71	3,257	11.67	1,246	4.46	1,589	5.69	200	0.72	1,702	6.10	27,907	67,384	41.40%	Labour
Durham	3,966	13.35	9,557	32.17	9,094	30.62	2,954	9.94	1,686	5.68	1,027	3.46	261	0.88	1,159	3.90	29,704	70,261	42.30%	Labour
Easington	2,090	8.96	11,530	49.44	2,650	11.36	2,218	9.51	810	3.47	1,828	7.84	162	0.69	2,034	8.72	23,322	70,410	33.10%	Labour
Gateshead	7,539	11.13	27,768	41.00	14,107	20.83	8,190	12.09	3,071	4.53	4,723	6.97	534	0.79	1,795	2.65	67,727	144,928	46.70%	Labour
Hartlepool	4,332	16.98	8,295	32.51	3,469	13.59	5,056	19.81	1,058	4.15	1,572	6.16	266	1.04	1,469	5.76	25,517	68,471	37.30%	Labour
Middlesbrough	6,714	20.79	10,189	31.55	4,343	13.45	4,508	13.96	1,381	4.28	3,091	9.57	1,182	3.66	883	2.73	32,291	100,357	32.20%	Labour
Newcastle-upon-Tyne	12,951	15.73	25,979	31.55	21,246	25.80	9,094	11.05	4,977	6.04	4,798	5.83	1,691	2.05	1,598	1.94	82,334	184,075	44.70%	Labour
North Tyneside	17,813	26.43	22,152	32.87	10,249	15.21	8,027	11.91	3,346	4.96	3,703	5.49	511	0.76	1,602	2.38	67,403	139,564	48.30%	Labour
Redcar and Cleveland	9,694	24.27	12,092	30.27	5,910	14.79	5,470	13.69	1,991	4.98	3,699	9.26	371	0.93	723	1.81	39,950	103,828	38.50%	Labour
Sedgefield	3,600	13.67	11,420	43.36	3,918	14.88	3,285	12.47	1,061	4.03	1,478	5.61	204	0.77	1,372	5.21	26,338	68,379	38.50%	Labour
South Tyneside	6,941	15.22	16,685	36.59	6,715	14.73	6,269	13.75	2,313	5.07	3,116	6.83	500	1.10	3,057	6.70	45,596	114,322	39.90%	Labour
Stockton-on-Tees	11,209	23.98	13,344	28.55	7,151	15.30	7,067	15.12	1,832	3.92	4,110	8.79	740	1.58	1,283	2.75	46,736	133,105	35.10%	Labour
Sunderland	12,764	15.42	30,576	36.95	8,238	9.95	7,060	8.53	2,876	3.48	6,970	8.42	614	0.74	13,661	16.51	82,759	210,830	39.30%	Labour
Teesdale	2,884	32.64	2,107	23.85	1,281	14.50	1,221	13.82	575	6.51	344	3.89	51	0.58	372	4.21	8,835	19,833	44.50%	Conservative
Tynedale	7,654	33.73	4,675	20.60	4,391	19.35	2,773	12.22	1,509	6.65	668	2.94	208	0.92	811	3.57	22,689	47,132	48.10%	Conservative
Wansbeck	1,831	9.95	8,138	44.23	3,794	20.62	1,973	10.72	912	4.96	957	5.20	130	0.71	665	3.61	18,400	46,896	39.20%	Labour
Wear Valley	2,801	14.79	7,248	38.27	3,413	18.02	2,423	12.79	862	4.55	983	5.19	181	0.96	1,027	5.42	18,938	47,949	39.50%	Labour

== North West of England ==
European Parliament election, 2004 (North West England)

Local authority	Con		Lab		Lib Dem		UKIP		Green		BNP		Respect		Others		Total	Electorate		Party won in 2004
Local authority	#	%	#	%	#	%	#	%	#	%	#	%	#	%	#	%	Total	Electorate	Turnout	Party won in 2004
Allerdale	8,074	29.07	7,582	27.30	2,910	10.48	3,888	14.00	1,428	5.14	1,381	4.97	1,381	0.58	2,347	8.45	27,772	74,711	37.20%	Conservative
Barrow-in-Furness	5,272	25.37	6,778	32.62	1,782	8.58	3,136	15.09	880	4.24	869	4.18	869	0.70	1,915	9.22	20,778	50,001	41.60%	Labour
Blackburn with Darwen	10,190	20.88	12,030	24.65	10,577	21.67	4,776	9.79	1,861	3.81	4,491	9.20	4,491	2.92	3,458	7.08	48,809	101,185	48.20%	Labour
Blackpool	11,245	29.16	10,414	27.01	3,185	8.26	5,888	15.27	1,615	4.19	2,641	6.85	2,641	0.57	3,351	8.69	38,558	110,503	34.90%	Labour
Bolton	19,701	24.22	22,225	27.33	14,455	17.77	8,869	10.90	3,162	3.89	5,427	6.67	5,427	2.19	5,716	7.03	81,333	191,196	42.50%	Labour
Burnley	4,879	15.34	7,814	24.56	6,377	20.05	3,464	10.89	1,068	3.36	5,301	16.66	5,301	1.27	2,505	7.87	31,811	64,219	49.50%	Labour
Bury	18,098	27.36	19,101	28.88	7,378	11.16	8,012	12.11	3,129	4.73	5,509	8.33	5,509	1.26	4,079	6.17	66,139	138,290	47.80%	Labour
Carlisle	10,972	32.36	8,690	25.63	3,760	11.09	4,311	12.71	1,775	5.23	1,722	5.08	1,722	0.46	2,523	7.44	33,910	80,113	42.30%	Conservative
Chester	14,147	32.02	9,849	22.29	6,779	15.34	6,556	14.84	2,894	6.55	1,211	2.74	1,211	0.48	2,534	5.74	44,182	91,111	48.50%	Conservative
Chorley	12,493	32.34	10,146	26.27	3,999	10.35	4,511	11.68	1,877	4.86	2,339	6.06	2,339	0.63	3,017	7.81	38,625	78,825	49.00%	Conservative
Congleton	11,385	33.15	5,965	17.37	5,506	16.03	4,920	14.32	2,075	6.04	1,749	5.09	1,749	0.34	2,629	7.65	34,347	73,402	46.80%	Conservative
Copeland	5,827	28.90	6,439	31.93	1,700	8.43	2,635	13.07	601	2.98	1,148	5.69	1,148	0.51	1,712	8.49	20,164	53,677	37.60%	Labour
Crewe and Nantwich	11,458	29.37	10,587	27.14	4,514	11.57	5,236	13.42	2,115	5.42	2,136	5.48	2,136	0.43	2,793	7.16	39,008	85,388	45.70%	Conservative
Eden	6,791	38.64	2,094	11.91	2,688	15.29	2,656	15.11	1,356	7.72	546	3.11	546	0.51	1,355	7.71	17,575	40,088	43.80%	Conservative
Ellesmere Port and Neston	6,841	26.05	8,422	32.07	2,720	10.36	3,515	13.38	1,383	5.27	1,355	5.16	1,355	0.66	1,854	7.06	26,264	62,449	42.10%	Labour
Fylde	10,445	39.10	4,166	15.59	2,504	9.37	4,675	17.50	1,410	5.28	1,264	4.73	1,264	0.42	2,139	8.01	26,715	60,060	44.50%	Conservative
Halton	5,423	16.04	12,881	38.09	4,000	11.83	4,533	13.40	1,839	5.44	2,170	6.42	2,170	0.63	2,758	8.16	33,817	91,072	37.10%	Labour
Hyndburn	6,425	25.72	6,095	24.40	3,408	13.64	2,896	11.59	1,223	4.90	2,910	11.65	2,910	1.05	1,762	7.05	24,981	58,938	42.40%	Conservative
Knowsley	3,162	8.97	17,401	49.36	4,675	13.26	3,031	8.60	1,715	4.86	2,005	5.69	2,005	1.08	2,884	8.18	35,254	108,744	32.40%	Labour
Lancaster	12,412	29.76	9,201	22.06	4,925	11.81	5,495	13.18	4,583	10.99	1,751	4.20	1,751	0.76	3,019	7.24	41,705	103,857	40.20%	Conservative
Liverpool	10,234	9.25	38,640	34.92	27,510	24.86	9,159	8.28	6,936	6.27	4,611	4.17	4,611	1.98	11,366	10.27	110,648	337,414	32.80%	Labour
Macclesfield	22,404	37.56	9,704	16.27	9,129	15.30	8,672	14.54	3,849	6.45	2,153	3.61	2,153	0.53	3,426	5.74	59,655	120,703	49.40%	Conservative
Manchester	10,823	10.34	36,468	34.83	24,964	23.84	7,764	7.41	8,350	7.97	5,380	5.14	5,380	3.10	7,707	7.36	104,707	312,771	33.50%	Labour
Oldham	10,993	15.28	18,223	25.34	18,197	25.30	8,035	11.17	3,244	4.51	7,486	10.41	7,486	1.18	4,892	6.80	71,922	158,587	45.40%	Labour
Pendle	6,405	19.67	5,787	17.77	8,812	27.06	3,601	11.06	1,276	3.92	4,322	13.27	4,322	1.24	1,958	6.01	32,566	64,368	50.60%	Liberal Democrat
Preston	11,071	27.09	9,664	23.65	5,687	13.91	4,748	11.62	1,934	4.73	2,546	6.23	2,546	6.01	2,765	6.77	40,870	98,413	41.50%	Conservative
Ribble Valley	8,665	41.26	2,629	12.52	2,777	13.22	2,759	13.14	1,110	5.29	1,423	6.78	1,423	0.49	1,534	7.30	21,000	43,721	48.00%	Conservative
Rochdale	11,550	18.07	15,719	24.59	14,658	22.93	7,015	10.97	2,957	4.63	5,949	9.31	5,949	1.38	5,194	8.13	63,924	148,538	43.00%	Labour
Rossendale	6,072	26.40	5,132	22.32	2,467	10.73	2,865	12.46	1,423	6.19	2,383	10.36	2,383	0.78	2,474	10.76	22,996	50,440	45.60%	Conservative
Salford	9,693	18.60	17,630	33.83	6,267	12.03	7,043	13.52	2,695	5.17	4,166	8.00	4,166	0.99	4,099	7.87	52,107	157,859	33.00%	Labour
Sefton	21,057	23.99	24,425	27.83	15,567	17.74	10,027	11.43	5,037	5.74	3,911	4.46	3,911	0.86	6,974	7.95	87,757	203,176	43.20%	Labour
South Lakeland	15,018	36.74	5,130	12.55	8,186	20.03	5,110	12.50	3,280	8.02	1,137	2.78	1,137	0.41	2,847	6.96	40,876	82,348	49.60%	Conservative
South Ribble	10,043	30.67	7,271	22.20	4,030	12.31	4,598	14.04	1,667	5.09	2,291	7.00	2,291	0.63	2,641	8.07	32,746	81,864	40.00%	Conservative
St. Helens	7,899	15.38	19,870	38.69	8,055	15.69	5,472	10.66	2,100	4.09	3,047	5.93	3,047	0.61	4,595	8.95	51,351	135,488	37.90%	Labour
Stockport	22,997	24.29	18,116	19.13	21,437	22.64	13,620	14.38	5,741	6.06	5,093	5.38	5,093	0.81	6,911	7.30	94,685	219,841	43.10%	Conservative
Tameside	11,404	18.30	20,453	32.82	5,988	9.61	8,181	13.13	3,826	6.14	6,609	10.60	6,609	0.97	5,257	8.44	62,322	165,987	37.50%	Labour
Trafford	23,949	33.94	17,118	24.26	8,997	12.75	7,799	11.05	4,536	6.43	3,238	4.59	3,238	1.30	4,000	5.67	70,555	158,498	44.50%	Conservative
Vale Royal	12,786	32.19	9,136	23.00	5,117	12.88	5,564	14.01	2,137	5.38	2,073	5.22	2,073	0.45	2,732	6.88	39,722	96,428	41.20%	Conservative
Warrington	13,822	22.55	17,776	29.01	9,614	15.69	8,114	13.24	3,125	5.10	3,230	5.27	3,230	0.56	5,262	8.59	61,284	148,092	41.40%	Labour
West Lancashire	11,479	31.64	9,978	27.50	3,046	8.40	5,567	15.35	2,272	6.26	1,560	4.30	1,560	0.55	2,178	6.00	36,278	86,254	42.10%	Conservative
Wigan	13,449	16.06	33,275	39.74	8,138	9.72	10,131	12.10	4,214	5.03	7,608	9.09	7,608	0.69	6,341	7.57	83,730	234,282	35.70%	Labour
Wirral	28,773	27.67	29,241	28.12	15,653	15.06	11,608	11.16	5,835	5.61	4,665	4.49	4,665	0.77	7,395	7.11	103,971	243,377	42.70%	Labour
Wyre	13,620	36.09	7,123	18.87	2,925	7.75	6,703	17.76	1,860	4.93	2,153	5.70	2,153	0.37	3,222	8.54	37,744	85,210	44.30%	Conservative

== South East of England ==
European Parliament election, 2004 (South East England).

Local authority	Con		Lab		Lib Dem		UKIP		Green		BNP		Respect		Others		Total	Electorate		Party won in 2004
Local authority	#	%	#	%	#	%	#	%	#	%	#	%	#	%	#	%	Total	Electorate	Turnout	Party won in 2004
Adur	5,761	33.28	2,597	15.00	1,875	10.83	3,621	20.92	1,435	8.29	535	3.09	94	0.54	1,393	8.05	17,311	46,298	37.40%	Conservative
Arun	15,031	37.05	4,000	9.86	4,516	11.13	11,364	28.01	2,511	6.19	1,078	2.66	93	0.23	1,975	4.87	40,568	110,173	36.80%	Conservative
Ashford	11,148	40.20	4,002	14.43	2,973	10.72	5,621	20.27	1,897	6.84	864	3.12	85	0.31	1,141	4.11	27,731	78,255	35.40%	Conservative
Aylesbury Vale	16,525	38.25	4,687	10.85	6,629	15.34	8,439	19.53	3,075	7.12	1,581	3.66	365	0.84	1,904	4.41	43,205	120,970	35.70%	Conservative
Basingstoke and Deane	15,648	36.61	6,309	14.76	6,956	16.27	7,209	16.87	2,828	6.62	1,249	2.92	145	0.34	2,400	5.61	42,744	112,582	38.00%	Conservative
Bracknell Forest	9,438	37.08	3,834	15.06	3,061	12.03	4,853	19.07	1,707	6.71	836	3.28	111	0.44	1,611	6.33	25,451	77,308	32.90%	Conservative
Brighton and Hove	15,844	26.03	12,072	19.83	7,899	12.97	7,936	13.04	12,106	19.89	1,055	1.73	996	1.64	2,971	4.88	60,879	182,950	33.30%	Conservative
Canterbury	12,404	34.89	5,253	14.78	4,937	13.89	6,922	19.47	3,520	9.90	976	2.75	224	0.63	1,315	3.70	35,551	98,299	36.20%	Conservative
Cherwell	14,138	37.81	5,467	14.62	5,188	13.88	5,789	15.48	2,755	7.37	1,476	3.95	252	0.67	2,323	6.21	37,388	101,922	36.70%	Conservative
Chichester	13,136	38.79	2,920	8.62	4,678	13.82	8,343	24.64	2,734	8.07	554	1.64	91	0.27	1,405	4.15	33,861	84,993	39.80%	Conservative
Chiltern	11,561	41.24	2,431	8.67	4,140	14.77	6,127	21.86	2,032	7.25	693	2.47	129	0.46	919	3.28	28,032	71,013	39.50%	Conservative
Crawley	6,523	26.39	6,370	25.77	2,620	10.60	4,365	17.66	1,594	6.45	1,637	6.62	361	1.46	1,249	5.05	24,719	72,658	34.00%	Conservative
Dartford	6,426	30.30	4,797	22.62	1,727	8.14	4,628	21.82	1,128	5.32	1,171	5.52	103	0.49	1,229	5.79	21,209	65,663	32.30%	Conservative
Dover	9,328	32.70	6,745	23.65	2,755	9.66	5,559	19.49	1,790	6.28	932	3.27	155	0.54	1,259	4.41	28,523	81,076	35.20%	Conservative
East Hampshire	12,413	39.86	2,502	8.03	5,203	16.71	6,274	20.15	2,766	8.88	729	2.34	58	0.19	1,194	3.83	31,139	85,797	36.30%	Conservative
Eastbourne	9,804	36.53	2,491	9.28	4,924	18.35	5,179	19.30	1,916	7.14	707	2.63	106	0.39	1,714	6.39	26,841	66,174	40.60%	Conservative
Eastleigh	9,400	27.10	4,456	12.84	8,654	24.95	7,379	21.27	2,133	6.15	839	2.42	89	0.26	1,742	5.02	34,692	88,873	39.00%	Conservative
Elmbridge	14,153	40.98	3,799	11.00	4,945	14.32	6,379	18.47	2,843	8.23	633	1.83	159	0.46	1,627	4.71	34,538	89,263	38.70%	Conservative
Epsom and Ewell	6,289	36.97	2,102	12.36	2,533	14.89	3,456	20.31	1,337	7.86	417	2.45	81	0.48	798	4.69	17,013	51,760	32.90%	Conservative
Fareham	13,071	38.67	3,777	11.17	5,008	14.81	6,846	20.25	2,070	6.12	1,026	3.04	105	0.31	1,901	5.62	33,804	84,240	40.10%	Conservative
Gosport	7,063	33.79	3,030	14.50	2,129	10.19	5,222	24.98	1,185	5.67	828	3.96	92	0.44	1,352	6.47	20,901	58,904	35.50%	Conservative
Gravesham	7,734	34.00	5,480	24.09	1,784	7.84	4,199	18.46	1,266	5.57	1,081	4.75	86	0.38	1,117	4.91	22,747	68,590	33.20%	Conservative
Guildford	13,307	38.44	3,393	9.80	7,647	22.09	5,497	15.88	2,515	7.27	756	2.18	119	0.34	1,383	4.00	34,617	96,944	35.70%	Conservative
Hart	10,132	40.28	2,095	8.33	4,490	17.85	4,799	19.08	1,694	6.73	736	2.93	52	0.21	1,156	4.60	25,154	65,363	38.50%	Conservative
Hastings	5,631	26.37	4,668	21.86	2,531	11.85	4,338	20.32	2,345	10.98	645	3.02	151	0.71	1,043	4.88	21,352	62,731	34.00%	Conservative
Havant	11,352	36.73	3,906	12.64	4,281	13.85	5,970	19.32	2,037	6.59	1,028	3.33	114	0.37	2,217	7.17	30,905	91,616	33.70%	Conservative
Horsham	14,470	38.61	3,255	8.68	5,977	15.95	8,571	22.87	2,809	7.49	780	2.08	77	0.21	1,540	4.11	37,479	97,516	38.40%	Conservative
Isle of Wight	11,341	32.44	3,479	9.95	4,234	12.11	9,913	28.35	2,745	7.85	918	2.63	100	0.29	2,235	6.39	34,965	107,184	32.60%	Conservative
Lewes	9,019	31.90	2,622	9.27	5,738	20.29	5,081	17.97	3,655	12.93	612	2.16	98	0.35	1,450	5.13	28,275	72,265	39.10%	Conservative
Maidstone	15,138	36.63	5,891	14.25	6,285	15.21	8,041	19.46	2,754	6.66	1,329	3.22	146	0.35	1,747	4.23	41,331	107,750	38.40%	Conservative
Medway	17,413	33.36	10,730	20.56	5,352	10.25	10,526	20.16	2,927	5.61	2,562	4.91	264	0.51	2,427	4.65	52,201	178,383	29.30%	Conservative
Mid Sussex	13,930	38.61	2,931	8.12	6,689	18.54	7,237	20.06	2,992	8.29	786	2.18	101	0.28	1,409	3.91	36,075	96,791	37.30%	Conservative
Milton Keynes	15,393	26.25	12,743	21.73	8,322	14.19	10,636	18.14	4,122	7.03	3,066	5.23	480	0.82	3,876	6.61	58,638	157,587	37.20%	Conservative
Mole Valley	11,384	38.63	2,521	8.56	5,362	18.20	5,301	17.99	2,981	10.12	510	1.73	80	0.27	1,329	4.51	29,468	61,930	47.60%	Conservative
New Forest	20,016	39.32	4,469	8.78	7,907	15.53	11,319	22.24	3,221	6.33	1,288	2.53	127	0.25	2,558	5.03	50,905	138,267	36.80%	Conservative
Oxford	5,706	16.01	7,681	21.55	7,977	22.38	3,640	10.21	7,017	19.69	743	2.08	803	2.25	2,070	5.81	35,637	99,329	35.90%	Liberal Democrat
Portsmouth	11,732	27.10	7,303	16.87	8,197	18.94	7,893	18.24	3,115	7.20	2,003	4.63	508	1.17	2,533	5.85	43,284	126,295	34.30%	Conservative
Reading	9,150	24.54	10,062	26.98	5,950	15.96	4,554	12.21	3,707	9.94	1,108	2.97	594	1.59	2,164	5.80	37,289	105,491	35.30%	Labour
Reigate and Banstead	13,860	37.98	4,297	11.77	5,042	13.82	7,794	21.36	2,638	7.23	1,095	3.00	156	0.43	1,612	4.42	36,494	94,000	38.80%	Conservative
Rother	11,070	39.18	2,829	10.01	3,493	12.36	7,212	25.53	1,664	5.89	697	2.47	95	0.34	1,193	4.22	28,253	67,084	42.10%	Conservative
Runnymede	7,169	35.87	2,706	13.54	2,058	10.30	4,644	23.23	1,317	6.59	501	2.51	109	0.55	1,484	7.42	19,988	58,007	34.50%	Conservative
Rushmoor	6,643	30.93	2,944	13.71	3,727	17.35	4,180	19.46	1,352	6.30	1,056	4.92	95	0.44	1,479	6.89	21,476	59,174	36.30%	Conservative
Sevenoaks	12,518	39.71	3,559	11.29	4,215	13.37	6,485	20.57	2,285	7.25	1,010	3.20	105	0.33	1,349	4.28	31,526	84,814	37.20%	Conservative
Shepway	13,823	48.40	3,017	10.56	3,370	11.80	4,806	16.83	1,555	5.44	735	2.57	85	0.30	1,170	4.10	28,561	71,475	40.00%	Conservative
Slough	5,626	19.49	9,694	33.59	3,446	11.94	4,022	13.94	1,651	5.72	1,128	3.91	1,688	5.85	1,607	5.57	28,862	78,852	36.60%	Labour
South Bucks	7,583	43.61	1,623	9.33	1,861	10.70	4,012	23.07	947	5.45	558	3.21	56	0.32	749	4.31	17,389	47,702	36.50%	Conservative
South Oxfordshire	12,985	37.79	4,130	12.02	5,309	15.45	6,196	18.03	3,298	9.60	905	2.63	111	0.32	1,426	4.15	34,360	99,901	34.40%	Conservative
Southampton	12,346	23.98	12,037	23.38	8,530	16.57	8,887	17.26	4,217	8.19	1,854	3.60	450	0.87	3,173	6.16	51,494	163,735	31.40%	Conservative
Spelthorne	8,575	37.50	3,258	14.25	2,432	10.63	5,350	23.40	1,184	5.18	873	3.82	124	0.54	1,072	4.69	22,868	69,708	32.80%	Conservative
Surrey Heath	8,515	41.86	1,667	8.19	3,945	19.39	3,938	19.36	1,046	5.14	539	2.65	44	0.22	648	3.19	20,342	61,557	33.00%	Conservative
Swale	10,128	33.70	5,952	19.80	3,541	11.78	5,952	19.80	1,979	6.58	983	3.27	107	0.36	1,415	4.71	30,057	84,256	35.70%	Conservative
Tandridge	10,744	40.13	2,270	8.48	4,282	15.99	5,911	22.08	1,650	6.16	734	2.74	82	0.31	1,099	4.11	26,772	59,405	45.10%	Conservative
Test Valley	13,119	40.72	2,829	8.78	5,797	17.99	6,407	19.89	1,895	5.88	596	1.85	59	0.18	1,516	4.71	32,218	87,620	36.80%	Conservative
Thanet	10,370	32.13	6,224	19.28	2,545	7.88	8,768	27.16	1,718	5.32	1,042	3.23	196	0.61	1,414	4.38	32,277	96,575	33.40%	Conservative
Tonbridge and Malling	11,434	39.68	3,832	13.30	3,413	11.84	5,940	20.61	2,038	7.07	884	3.07	90	0.31	1,187	4.12	28,818	83,342	34.60%	Conservative
Tunbridge Wells	11,818	39.26	3,294	10.94	4,703	15.62	5,793	19.24	2,623	8.71	554	1.84	119	0.40	1,201	3.99	30,105	77,445	38.90%	Conservative
Vale of White Horse	10,814	33.67	3,617	11.26	7,248	22.57	5,142	16.01	2,918	9.08	782	2.43	130	0.40	1,469	4.57	32,120	89,770	35.80%	Conservative
Waverley	15,096	41.62	2,550	7.03	7,150	19.71	6,518	17.97	3,122	8.61	554	1.53	77	0.21	1,203	3.32	36,270	88,880	40.80%	Conservative
Wealden	17,035	38.51	3,477	7.86	6,278	14.19	10,792	24.40	3,576	8.08	1,001	2.26	120	0.27	1,956	4.42	44,235	111,754	39.60%	Conservative
West Berkshire	15,257	39.23	3,188	8.20	8,809	22.65	5,945	15.29	2,702	6.95	982	2.53	94	0.24	1,914	4.92	38,891	108,302	35.90%	Conservative
West Oxfordshire	11,001	35.44	3,826	12.33	4,714	15.19	5,947	19.16	3,269	10.53	757	2.44	102	0.33	1,425	4.59	31,041	72,963	42.50%	Conservative
Winchester	14,441	35.49	3,245	7.98	10,422	25.62	6,824	16.77	3,281	8.06	615	1.51	126	0.31	1,731	4.25	40,685	83,958	48.50%	Conservative
Windsor and Maidenhead	13,407	38.21	3,454	9.84	7,015	19.99	6,424	18.31	2,233	6.36	1,018	2.90	193	0.55	1,346	3.84	35,090	97,566	36.00%	Conservative
Woking	10,205	37.71	3,016	11.14	5,639	20.84	4,447	16.43	1,593	5.89	609	2.25	300	1.11	1,254	4.63	27,063	68,432	39.50%	Conservative
Wokingham	17,384	39.58	4,216	9.60	7,760	17.67	8,314	18.93	2,928	6.67	1,281	2.92	203	0.46	1,836	4.18	43,922	109,285	40.20%	Conservative
Worthing	10,418	35.35	2,704	9.18	4,549	15.44	6,450	21.89	2,415	8.20	716	2.43	160	0.54	2,056	6.98	29,468	77,681	37.90%	Conservative
Wycombe	15,034	37.26	5,073	12.57	4,976	12.33	8,985	22.27	2,993	7.42	1,051	2.60	356	0.88	1,882	4.66	40,350	118,103	34.20%	Conservative

== South West of England ==
European Parliament election, 2004 (South West England)

Local authority	Con		Lab		Lib Dem		UKIP		Green		BNP		Respect		Others		Total	Electorate		Party won in 2004
Local authority	#	%	#	%	#	%	#	%	#	%	#	%	#	%	#	%	Total	Electorate	Turnout	Party won in 2004
Bath and North East Somerset	14,271	30.27	8,386	17.79	9,974	21.15	7,499	15.90	4,744	10.06	1,167	2.48	430	0.91	678	1.44	47,149	124,998	37.70%	Conservative
Bournemouth	12,241	32.57	4,538	12.07	6,489	17.26	10,469	27.85	2,148	5.71	1,151	3.06	233	0.62	318	0.85	37,587	124,803	30.10%	Conservative
Bristol	20,281	21.25	24,250	25.41	20,214	21.18	13,094	13.72	10,780	11.30	3,934	4.12	1,972	2.07	898	0.94	95,423	281,343	33.90%	Labour
Caradon	6,649	25.43	2,382	9.11	5,750	22.00	8,308	31.78	1,605	6.14	613	2.34	144	0.55	691	2.64	26,142	64,216	40.70%	UKIP
Carrick	6,572	27.51	2,975	12.45	4,993	20.90	6,446	26.98	1,861	7.79	485	2.03	202	0.85	359	1.50	23,893	67,021	35.70%	Conservative
Cheltenham	11,560	34.98	4,030	12.20	7,901	23.91	5,153	15.59	3,008	9.10	695	2.10	201	0.61	498	1.51	33,046	84,460	39.10%	Conservative
Christchurch	6,563	42.23	1,574	10.13	2,269	14.60	3,703	23.83	705	4.54	487	3.13	70	0.45	170	1.09	15,541	36,725	42.30%	Conservative
Cotswold	10,911	42.43	2,610	10.15	4,348	16.91	4,674	18.18	1,618	6.29	477	1.86	115	0.45	961	3.74	25,714	62,513	41.10%	Conservative
East Devon	16,549	36.44	4,072	8.97	7,283	16.04	12,078	26.60	2,721	5.99	1,050	2.31	231	0.51	1,428	3.14	45,412	101,127	44.90%	Conservative
East Dorset	11,793	42.25	2,128	7.62	4,771	17.09	6,631	23.76	1,290	4.62	735	2.63	88	0.32	476	1.71	27,912	70,603	39.50%	Conservative
Exeter	7,452	22.56	7,997	24.21	5,986	18.13	6,673	20.21	3,137	9.50	1,014	3.07	407	1.23	360	1.09	33,026	83,804	39.40%	Labour
Forest of Dean	7,278	31.48	5,305	22.95	3,089	13.36	4,003	17.32	1,760	7.61	721	3.12	299	1.29	663	2.87	23,118	63,523	36.40%	Conservative
Gibraltar	8,297	70.67	1,127	9.60	905	7.71	140	1.19	1,058	9.01	105	0.89	20	0.17	88	0.75	11,740	20,740	56.60%	Conservative
Gloucester	9,111	31.60	6,575	22.80	4,773	16.55	4,916	17.05	1,602	5.56	1,232	4.27	328	1.14	299	1.04	28,836	81,768	35.30%	Conservative
Isles of Scilly	163	22.77	68	9.50	147	20.53	230	32.12	58	8.10	13	1.82	5	0.70	32	4.47	716	1,508	47.50%	UKIP
Kennet	8,394	38.37	2,413	11.03	3,140	14.35	5,076	23.20	1,464	6.69	560	2.56	95	0.43	737	3.37	21,879	57,390	38.10%	Conservative
Kerrier	5,457	23.91	3,675	16.10	3,906	17.11	7,128	31.23	1,400	6.13	536	2.35	130	0.57	594	2.60	22,826	69,007	33.10%	UKIP
Mendip	10,387	33.79	3,311	10.77	6,404	20.84	5,676	18.47	3,025	9.84	822	2.67	178	0.58	933	3.04	30,736	79,817	38.50%	Conservative
Mid Devon	6,839	30.78	2,045	9.21	3,804	17.12	5,872	26.43	1,809	8.14	598	2.69	137	0.62	1,112	5.01	22,216	55,058	40.40%	Conservative
North Cornwall	6,494	27.30	1,730	7.27	5,621	23.63	7,149	30.05	1,423	5.98	565	2.37	88	0.37	720	3.03	23,790	64,120	37.10%	UKIP
North Devon	7,424	27.30	2,077	7.64	5,406	19.88	8,073	29.69	1,861	6.84	672	2.47	131	0.48	1,551	5.70	27,195	70,495	38.60%	UKIP
North Dorset	7,205	36.12	1,546	7.75	3,757	18.83	4,647	23.29	1,413	7.08	469	2.35	94	0.47	818	4.10	19,949	48,717	40.90%	Conservative
North Somerset	18,914	35.10	7,575	14.06	10,250	19.02	10,408	19.32	3,700	6.87	1,843	3.42	351	0.65	843	1.56	53,884	146,051	36.90%	Conservative
North Wiltshire	13,054	35.47	3,903	10.61	7,073	19.22	8,244	22.40	2,374	6.45	1,010	2.74	169	0.46	972	2.64	36,799	97,778	37.60%	Conservative
Penwith	5,559	24.34	3,161	13.84	5,807	25.42	4,949	21.67	1,908	8.35	622	2.72	184	0.81	652	2.85	22,842	49,424	46.20%	Liberal Democrat
Plymouth	15,181	23.40	16,561	25.53	8,593	13.25	17,415	26.85	3,145	4.85	2,831	4.36	524	0.81	613	0.95	64,863	183,782	35.30%	UKIP
Poole	12,830	36.16	4,029	11.35	6,442	18.15	8,612	24.27	1,781	5.02	1,207	3.40	176	0.50	408	1.15	35,485	105,382	33.70%	Conservative
Purbeck	5,614	35.49	1,820	11.51	3,019	19.09	3,505	22.16	894	5.65	417	2.64	90	0.57	458	2.90	15,817	35,341	44.80%	Conservative
Restormel	5,359	24.75	2,469	11.40	4,864	22.46	6,434	29.71	1,253	5.79	680	3.14	143	0.66	454	2.10	21,656	72,505	29.90%	UKIP
Salisbury	13,376	38.06	3,999	11.38	5,344	15.20	8,327	23.69	2,432	6.92	799	2.27	151	0.43	720	2.05	35,148	85,078	41.30%	Conservative
Sedgemoor	10,691	35.48	4,166	13.83	4,763	15.81	6,424	21.32	1,956	6.49	1,075	3.57	153	0.51	905	3.00	30,133	83,395	36.10%	Conservative
South Gloucestershire	20,007	27.91	13,962	19.48	15,070	21.02	13,629	19.01	4,040	5.64	3,566	4.97	433	0.60	977	1.36	71,684	194,542	36.80%	Conservative
South Hams	9,057	30.99	2,759	9.44	4,701	16.09	8,892	30.43	2,592	8.87	486	1.66	190	0.65	548	1.88	29,225	65,419	44.70%	Conservative
South Somerset	14,379	33.03	3,335	7.66	10,908	25.05	9,864	22.66	2,524	5.80	1,253	2.88	182	0.42	1,093	2.51	43,538	120,539	36.10%	Conservative
Stroud	12,547	34.06	7,028	19.08	5,343	14.50	6,002	16.29	4,423	12.01	941	2.55	273	0.74	281	0.76	36,838	84,932	43.40%	Conservative
Swindon	14,002	31.35	10,460	23.42	5,717	12.80	8,652	19.37	2,868	6.42	2,002	4.48	412	0.92	545	1.22	44,658	140,645	31.80%	Conservative
Taunton Deane	10,621	34.10	3,564	11.44	6,232	20.01	6,232	20.01	2,482	7.97	781	2.51	165	0.53	1,074	3.45	31,151	80,645	38.60%	Conservative
Teignbridge	11,765	29.32	3,917	9.76	7,671	19.12	12,246	30.52	2,627	6.55	949	2.37	197	0.49	753	1.88	40,125	96,206	41.70%	UKIP
Tewkesbury	7,895	37.12	2,900	13.64	3,845	18.08	4,110	19.32	1,376	6.47	575	2.70	102	0.48	465	2.19	21,268	61,518	34.60%	Conservative
Torbay	10,860	30.35	3,875	10.83	4,965	13.88	12,552	35.08	1,808	5.05	1,181	3.30	199	0.56	341	0.95	35,781	99,203	36.10%	UKIP
Torridge	5,116	27.42	1,488	7.97	2,953	15.83	6,488	34.77	1,307	7.00	437	2.34	94	0.50	776	4.16	18,659	46,670	40.00%	UKIP
West Devon	5,186	28.95	1,340	7.48	3,060	17.08	6,115	34.14	1,323	7.39	259	1.45	84	0.47	545	3.04	17,912	38,884	46.10%	UKIP
West Dorset	12,407	38.36	3,181	9.84	6,335	19.59	6,396	19.78	2,202	6.81	629	1.94	190	0.59	1,000	3.09	32,340	76,120	42.50%	Conservative
West Somerset	4,707	38.29	1,400	11.39	1,535	12.49	2,541	20.67	769	6.26	295	2.40	57	0.46	990	8.05	12,294	28,776	42.70%	Conservative
West Wiltshire	10,713	33.57	3,740	11.72	6,511	20.40	6,694	20.97	2,396	7.51	1,070	3.35	177	0.55	616	1.93	31,917	90,414	35.30%	Conservative
Weymouth and Portland	5,640	27.44	4,462	21.71	3,688	17.94	4,415	21.48	1,151	5.60	644	3.13	143	0.70	411	2.00	20,554	48,072	42.80%	Conservative

== West Midlands ==
European Parliament election, 2004 (West Midlands)

Local authority	Con		Lab		Lib Dem		UKIP		Green		BNP		Respect		Others		Total	Electorate		Party won in 2004
Local authority	#	%	#	%	#	%	#	%	#	%	#	%	#	%	#	%	Total	Electorate	Turnout	Party won in 2004
Birmingham	53,542	20.06	74,778	28.01	49,370	18.49	31,031	11.62	12,262	4.59	19,950	7.47	19,782	7.41	6,254	2.34	266,969	678,901	39.30%	Labour
Bridgnorth	5,341	34.15	1,865	11.93	2,739	17.52	3,682	23.55	853	5.45	667	4.27	73	0.47	418	2.67	15,638	41,542	37.60%	Conservative
Bromsgrove	9,537	35.71	4,414	16.53	2,671	10.00	5,769	21.60	1,524	5.71	1,747	6.54	123	0.46	925	3.46	26,710	70,354	38.00%	Conservative
Cannock Chase	4,711	21.76	5,607	25.90	3,121	14.42	4,538	20.97	862	3.98	1,740	8.04	61	0.28	1,005	4.64	21,645	71,508	30.30%	Labour
Coventry	19,325	25.03	24,036	31.14	9,249	11.98	10,324	13.37	4,441	5.75	5,037	6.52	2,130	2.76	2,655	3.44	77,197	214,622	36.00%	Labour
Dudley	23,274	26.37	20,521	23.25	8,797	9.97	16,638	18.85	3,516	3.98	10,883	12.33	1,417	1.61	3,198	3.62	88,244	235,280	37.50%	Conservative
East Staffordshire	8,847	32.49	5,725	21.02	2,729	10.02	5,373	19.73	1,183	4.34	2,342	8.60	362	1.33	672	2.47	27,233	80,228	33.90%	Conservative
Herefordshire	17,501	35.15	4,835	9.71	8,908	17.89	10,752	21.59	5,344	10.73	1,224	2.46	228	0.46	999	2.01	49,791	133,863	37.20%	Conservative
Lichfield	9,464	35.73	4,765	17.99	3,233	12.21	5,429	20.50	1,338	5.05	1,474	5.57	79	0.30	702	2.65	26,484	75,638	35.00%	Conservative
Malvern Hills	8,371	35.24	2,105	8.86	4,721	19.87	5,557	23.39	2,014	8.48	541	2.28	113	0.48	335	1.41	23,757	57,746	41.10%	Conservative
Newcastle-under-Lyme	6,734	22.03	8,788	28.75	4,451	14.56	5,233	17.12	1,554	5.08	2,586	8.46	176	0.58	1,047	3.43	30,569	95,471	32.00%	Labour
North Shropshire	5,926	38.27	2,123	13.71	1,881	12.15	3,766	24.32	767	4.95	628	4.06	60	0.39	334	2.16	15,485	44,404	34.90%	Conservative
North Warwickshire	4,242	27.57	3,615	23.50	1,634	10.62	3,292	21.40	740	4.81	1,388	9.02	61	0.40	413	2.68	15,385	48,685	31.60%	Conservative
Nuneaton and Bedworth	7,857	26.11	8,200	27.25	3,357	11.16	5,838	19.40	1,530	5.08	2,236	7.43	206	0.68	868	2.88	30,092	92,184	32.60%	Labour
Oswestry	2,822	28.97	1,673	17.17	1,576	16.18	2,355	24.18	623	6.40	442	4.54	43	0.44	207	2.13	9,741	28,125	34.60%	Conservative
Redditch	6,074	28.26	6,034	28.07	2,541	11.82	3,624	16.86	1,033	4.81	1,434	6.67	150	0.70	604	2.81	21,494	60,184	35.70%	Conservative
Rugby	8,895	32.64	5,704	20.93	4,294	15.76	4,611	16.92	1,694	6.22	1,252	4.59	171	0.63	630	2.31	27,251	69,064	39.50%	Conservative
Sandwell	13,064	17.19	27,527	36.22	6,930	9.12	10,734	14.12	2,745	3.61	9,976	13.13	2,671	3.51	2,352	3.09	75,999	206,292	36.80%	Labour
Shrewsbury and Atcham	9,358	30.64	6,078	19.90	5,259	17.22	5,828	19.08	2,043	6.69	1,171	3.83	147	0.48	660	2.16	30,544	72,927	41.90%	Conservative
Solihull	21,236	35.85	8,041	13.58	9,954	16.81	10,175	17.18	2,788	4.71	5,128	8.66	369	0.62	1,539	2.60	59,230	152,947	38.70%	Conservative
South Shropshire	5,033	36.30	1,222	8.81	3,010	21.71	2,747	19.81	1,146	8.27	380	2.74	85	0.61	242	1.75	13,865	33,193	41.80%	Conservative
South Staffordshire	8,984	32.93	4,319	15.83	2,728	10.00	7,189	26.35	1,101	4.04	1,989	7.29	89	0.33	886	3.25	27,285	83,637	32.60%	Conservative
Stafford	11,868	34.45	7,231	20.99	4,257	12.36	6,741	19.57	1,920	5.57	1,502	4.36	165	0.48	766	2.22	34,450	94,495	36.50%	Conservative
Staffordshire Moorlands	7,660	31.75	4,695	19.46	2,624	10.88	5,328	22.09	1,197	4.96	1,925	7.98	111	0.46	584	2.42	24,124	76,998	31.30%	Conservative
Stoke-on-Trent	7,900	15.58	15,099	29.79	5,627	11.10	9,298	18.34	2,120	4.18	7,745	15.28	623	1.23	2,280	4.50	50,692	184,958	27.40%	Conservative
Stratford on Avon	15,163	40.37	3,862	10.28	7,206	19.19	7,155	19.05	2,113	5.63	1,163	3.10	141	0.38	753	2.01	37,556	88,831	42.30%	Conservative
Tamworth	4,971	28.19	4,909	27.84	1,685	9.56	3,301	18.72	748	4.24	1,373	7.79	74	0.42	570	3.23	17,631	56,448	31.20%	Conservative
Telford and Wrekin	10,194	26.72	8,922	23.39	4,390	11.51	8,260	21.65	1,911	5.01	2,558	6.71	451	1.18	1,464	3.84	38,150	115,308	33.10%	Conservative
Walsall	17,259	25.80	15,764	23.57	5,610	8.39	13,224	19.77	2,081	3.11	7,418	11.09	2,755	4.12	2,783	4.16	66,894	186,614	35.80%	Conservative
Warwick	12,454	34.87	7,641	21.39	5,531	15.48	5,259	14.72	2,696	7.55	1,116	3.12	262	0.73	761	2.13	35,720	97,120	36.80%	Conservative
Wolverhampton	14,938	23.89	21,386	34.21	5,592	8.94	10,614	16.98	2,449	3.92	4,449	7.12	727	1.16	2,362	3.78	62,517	177,988	35.10%	Labour
Worcester	7,647	28.79	5,945	22.38	2,984	11.23	5,193	19.55	1,925	7.25	1,536	5.78	572	2.15	761	2.86	26,563	72,025	36.90%	Conservative
Wychavon	13,405	40.07	3,968	11.86	5,211	15.58	6,901	20.63	1,980	5.92	1,249	3.73	100	0.30	642	1.92	33,456	85,724	39.00%	Conservative
Wyre Forest	9,340	32.57	5,216	18.19	3,609	12.59	5,607	19.55	1,750	6.10	1,545	5.39	127	0.44	1,480	5.16	28,674	74,544	38.50%	Conservative

== Yorkshire and the Humber ==
European Parliament election, 2004 (Yorkshire and the Humber)

Local authority	Con		Lab		Lib Dem		UKIP		Green		BNP		Respect		Others		Total	Electorate		Party won in 2004
Local authority	#	%	#	%	#	%	#	%	#	%	#	%	#	%	#	%	Total	Electorate	Turnout	Party won in 2004
Barnsley	7,954	12.36	26,989	41.95	7,877	12.24	9,227	14.34	2,824	4.39	5,108	7.94	400	0.62	3,953	6.14	64,332	171,952	37.40%	Labour
Bradford	43,447	27.82	34,373	22.01	22,155	14.18	18,679	11.96	8,705	5.57	15,925	10.20	8,875	5.68	4,037	2.58	156,196	330,402	47.30%	Conservative
Calderdale	18,602	27.74	14,473	21.58	9,151	13.64	9,179	13.69	4,246	6.33	7,706	11.49	1,558	2.32	2,150	3.21	67,065	138,470	48.40%	Conservative
Craven	7,847	36.38	3,191	14.79	3,602	16.70	3,002	13.92	1,594	7.39	1,530	7.09	98	0.45	708	3.28	21,572	42,650	50.60%	Conservative
Doncaster	16,459	19.84	27,145	32.71	11,548	13.92	13,214	15.92	3,692	4.45	6,697	8.07	555	0.67	3,667	4.42	82,977	216,122	38.40%	Labour
East Riding of Yorkshire	37,110	34.54	18,912	17.60	18,602	17.32	18,176	16.92	4,915	4.58	6,191	5.76	334	0.31	3,190	2.97	107,430	255,667	42.00%	Conservative
Hambleton	14,615	46.54	4,291	13.66	4,491	14.30	4,308	13.72	1,709	5.44	1,050	3.34	104	0.33	835	2.66	31,403	67,893	46.30%	Conservative
Harrogate	21,335	39.37	5,783	10.67	12,256	22.61	8,551	15.78	2,870	5.30	1,861	3.43	187	0.35	1,354	2.50	54,197	114,623	47.30%	Conservative
Kingston upon Hull	7,568	11.96	20,175	31.88	12,356	19.52	12,179	19.24	2,921	4.62	5,351	8.45	439	0.69	2,303	3.64	63,292	181,902	34.80%	Labour
Kirklees	29,954	21.59	31,138	22.45	23,676	17.07	17,743	12.79	9,147	6.59	17,144	12.36	5,953	4.29	3,957	2.85	138,712	285,330	48.60%	Labour
Leeds	51,827	23.84	59,707	27.46	36,318	16.71	29,595	13.61	13,950	6.42	15,048	6.92	3,967	1.82	6,985	3.21	217,397	519,041	41.90%	Labour
North East Lincolnshire	10,948	25.41	10,796	25.06	6,166	14.31	7,507	17.42	1,912	4.44	3,468	8.05	182	0.42	2,103	4.88	43,082	117,269	36.70%	Conservative
North Lincolnshire	12,826	30.20	11,297	26.60	4,754	11.19	7,306	17.20	1,760	4.14	2,805	6.60	218	0.51	1,504	3.54	42,470	120,676	35.20%	Conservative
Richmondshire	6,836	43.90	1,978	12.70	2,427	15.59	2,404	15.44	734	4.71	652	4.19	58	0.37	481	3.09	15,570	34,552	45.10%	Conservative
Rotherham	12,727	17.01	28,778	38.47	8,621	11.52	10,758	14.38	3,160	4.22	6,875	9.19	959	1.28	2,931	3.92	74,809	184,621	40.50%	Labour
Ryedale	7,900	42.99	2,266	12.33	2,881	15.68	2,995	16.30	1,137	6.19	596	3.24	66	0.36	535	2.91	18,376	40,557	45.30%	Conservative
Scarborough	12,918	33.88	7,694	20.18	4,831	12.67	6,641	17.42	2,513	6.59	1,892	4.96	215	0.56	1,421	3.73	38,125	83,085	45.90%	Conservative
Selby	8,383	35.31	5,318	22.40	2,640	11.12	3,973	16.74	1,131	4.76	1,520	6.40	86	0.36	689	2.90	23,740	59,603	39.80%	Conservative
Sheffield	23,344	14.68	51,330	32.28	29,434	18.51	21,436	13.48	11,725	7.37	13,029	8.19	3,887	2.44	4,809	3.02	158,994	370,957	42.90%	Labour
Wakefield	18,185	19.06	33,707	35.32	10,274	10.77	14,161	14.84	4,361	4.57	10,126	10.61	1,184	1.24	3,428	3.59	95,426	244,962	39.00%	Labour
York	16,584	28.58	13,872	23.90	10,547	18.17	7,632	13.15	5,331	9.19	1,964	3.38	540	0.93	1,566	2.70	58,036	139,383	41.60%	Conservative

== Scotland ==
European Parliament election results, 2004 (Scotland by Westminster constituencies)

Westminster constituency	Con		Lab		Lib Dem		UKIP		Green		BNP		SNP		Others		Total	Electorate		Party won in 2004
Westminster constituency	#	%	#	%	#	%	#	%	#	%	#	%	#	%	#	%	Total	Electorate	Turnout	Party won in 2004
Aberdeen Central	1,926	14.40	3,585	26.80	2,334	17.45	796	5.95	892	6.67	148	1.11	2,831	21.16	865	6.47	13,377	47,831	28.00%	Labour
Aberdeen North	1,633	11.28	3,800	26.25	2,265	15.65	860	5.94	493	3.41	179	1.24	4,500	31.09	745	5.15	14,475	51,968	27.90%	Scottish National Party
Aberdeen South	4,313	22.98	3,823	20.37	4,146	22.09	1,227	6.54	1,112	5.92	172	0.92	3,063	16.32	913	4.86	18,769	57,076	32.90%	Conservative
Airdrie and Shotts	1,379	10.94	5,449	43.23	832	6.60	698	5.54	511	4.05	356	2.82	2,259	17.92	1,122	8.90	12,606	56,339	22.40%	Labour
Angus	4,479	23.63	2,490	13.14	1,818	9.59	1,630	8.60	1,012	5.34	278	1.47	6,272	33.09	973	5.13	18,952	59,761	31.70%	Scottish National Party
Argyll and Bute	3,714	20.43	2,857	15.72	3,575	19.67	1,548	8.52	1,259	6.93	247	1.36	3,538	19.46	1,441	7.93	18,179	48,212	37.70%	Conservative
Ayr	7,024	34.39	5,421	26.54	1,663	8.14	1,213	5.94	971	4.75	241	1.18	2,690	13.17	1,200	5.88	20,423	55,028	37.10%	Conservative
Banff and Buchan	3,516	20.72	1,486	8.76	1,289	7.59	1,468	8.65	577	3.40	264	1.56	7,073	41.67	1,300	7.66	16,973	55,807	30.40%	Scottish National Party
Caithness, Sutherland and Easter Ross	1,821	14.32	2,206	17.35	2,763	21.73	1,162	9.14	741	5.83	150	1.18	2,489	19.58	1,381	10.86	12,713	40,931	31.10%	Liberal Democrat
Carrick, Cumnock and Doon Valley	4,799	24.01	7,101	35.53	1,303	6.52	1,258	6.29	876	4.38	387	1.94	3,047	15.24	1,217	6.09	19,988	65,054	30.70%	Labour
Central Fife	1,391	9.36	5,260	35.41	1,196	8.05	1,244	8.37	644	4.34	286	1.93	3,745	25.21	1,088	7.32	14,854	57,336	25.90%	Labour
Clydebank and Milngavie	2,140	12.55	5,760	33.79	2,054	12.05	918	5.39	1,031	6.05	303	1.78	3,256	19.10	1,585	9.30	17,047	49,824	34.20%	Labour
Clydesdale	3,178	17.88	5,694	32.03	1,540	8.66	1,166	6.56	945	5.32	340	1.91	3,646	20.51	1,267	7.13	17,776	63,928	27.80%	Labour
Coatbridge and Chryston	1,334	10.06	5,986	45.12	970	7.31	671	5.06	680	5.13	230	1.73	2,089	15.75	1,306	9.84	13,266	48,066	27.60%	Labour
Cumbernauld and Kilsyth	864	6.41	4,632	34.36	969	7.19	708	5.25	716	5.31	267	1.98	3,716	27.56	1,609	11.94	13,481	48,174	28.00%	Labour
Cunninghame North	3,773	21.43	4,637	26.33	1,641	9.32	1,241	7.05	998	5.67	305	1.73	3,574	20.30	1,439	8.17	17,608	55,653	31.60%	Labour
Cunninghame South	1,483	11.12	5,128	38.46	962	7.22	967	7.25	540	4.05	285	2.14	2,616	19.62	1,352	10.14	13,333	49,982	26.70%	Labour
Dumbarton	3,566	19.05	4,655	24.87	2,265	12.10	1,490	7.96	893	4.77	354	1.89	3,600	19.24	1,892	10.11	18,715	54,276	34.50%	Labour
Dumfries	7,057	32.15	5,891	26.84	2,196	10.01	1,926	8.78	878	4.00	326	1.49	2,654	12.09	1,020	4.65	21,948	61,805	35.50%	Conservative
Dundee East	2,541	14.37	4,825	27.29	1,336	7.56	1,206	6.82	734	4.15	262	1.48	5,700	32.24	1,075	6.08	17,679	55,708	31.70%	Scottish National Party
Dundee West	1,564	9.99	4,974	31.77	1,462	9.34	945	6.04	741	4.73	248	1.58	4,407	28.15	1,316	8.41	15,657	52,763	29.70%	Scottish National Party
Dunfermline East	1,501	10.68	5,602	39.86	1,041	7.41	1,271	9.04	718	5.11	313	2.23	2,478	17.63	1,129	8.03	14,053	50,836	27.60%	Labour
Dunfermline West	1,853	12.45	4,405	29.60	2,184	14.68	1,442	9.69	991	6.66	297	2.00	2,668	17.93	1,041	7.00	14,881	54,737	27.20%	Labour
East Kilbride	2,192	11.09	6,399	32.37	2,029	10.26	1,290	6.52	1,137	5.75	426	2.15	4,354	22.02	1,944	9.83	19,771	65,677	30.10%	Labour
East Lothian	4,017	21.03	5,668	29.68	2,532	13.26	1,313	6.88	1,543	8.08	201	1.05	2,725	14.27	1,099	5.75	19,098	58,975	32.40%	Labour
Eastwood	7,366	29.78	5,900	23.85	3,293	13.31	1,411	5.70	1,553	6.28	431	1.74	3,145	12.71	1,639	6.63	24,738	66,334	37.30%	Conservative
Edinburgh Central	3,409	17.80	4,106	21.44	3,463	18.08	923	4.82	3,191	16.66	243	1.27	2,332	12.18	1,485	7.75	19,152	56,446	33.90%	Labour
Edinburgh East and Musselburgh	2,340	12.28	5,423	28.47	2,384	12.51	1,067	5.60	2,088	10.96	280	1.47	3,774	19.81	1,694	8.89	19,050	55,636	34.20%	Labour
Edinburgh North and Leith	3,077	16.03	4,404	22.94	3,057	15.93	878	4.57	3,320	17.30	180	0.94	2,743	14.29	1,536	8.00	19,195	57,855	33.20%	Labour
Edinburgh Pentlands	7,305	32.86	4,480	20.15	3,167	14.24	1,144	5.15	1,874	8.43	247	1.11	2,902	13.05	1,115	5.01	22,234	56,555	39.30%	Conservative
Edinburgh South	4,322	20.47	4,557	21.59	4,954	23.47	904	4.28	2,769	13.12	158	0.75	2,296	10.88	1,151	5.45	21,111	57,476	36.70%	Liberal Democrat
Edinburgh West	5,290	23.77	3,460	15.55	6,341	28.49	1,409	6.33	1,582	7.11	265	1.19	2,774	12.46	1,135	5.10	22,256	58,817	37.80%	Liberal Democrat
Falkirk East	1,872	12.44	5,061	33.62	1,160	7.71	1,109	7.37	845	5.61	330	2.19	3,631	24.12	1,046	6.95	15,054	55,663	27.00%	Labour
Falkirk West	1,704	11.64	5,130	35.06	1,053	7.20	893	6.10	845	5.77	340	2.32	3,557	24.31	1,112	7.60	14,634	52,087	28.10%	Labour
Galloway and Upper Nithsdale	7,222	36.23	2,789	13.99	1,842	9.24	1,861	9.34	1,091	5.47	271	1.36	3,974	19.93	885	4.44	19,935	51,865	38.40%	Conservative
Glasgow, Anniesland	1,522	10.47	5,305	36.51	1,596	10.98	747	5.14	1,260	8.67	277	1.91	2,291	15.77	1,532	10.54	14,530	49,783	29.20%	Labour
Glasgow Baillieston	809	7.89	4,321	42.17	592	5.78	508	4.96	388	3.79	263	2.57	2,137	20.85	1,229	11.99	10,247	44,799	22.90%	Labour
Glasgow Cathcart	1,600	11.60	4,586	33.24	1,472	10.67	707	5.12	1,186	8.60	328	2.38	2,142	15.52	1,777	12.88	13,798	48,982	28.20%	Labour
Glasgow Govan	1,261	10.08	3,392	27.12	1,396	11.16	551	4.41	1,443	11.54	313	2.50	2,551	20.40	1,599	12.79	12,506	47,831	26.10%	Labour
Glasgow Kelvin	1,273	8.99	3,616	25.54	2,220	15.68	578	4.08	2,373	16.76	205	1.45	1,906	13.46	1,989	14.05	14,160	54,982	25.80%	Labour
Glasgow Maryhill	511	4.77	4,062	37.88	1,093	10.19	510	4.76	1,056	9.85	257	2.40	1,747	16.29	1,486	13.86	10,722	47,122	22.80%	Labour
Glasgow Pollok	758	6.29	4,844	40.20	731	6.07	641	5.32	533	4.42	320	2.66	2,481	20.59	1,741	14.45	12,049	47,358	25.40%	Labour
Glasgow Rutherglen	1,491	10.86	5,185	37.76	1,874	13.65	756	5.50	758	5.52	373	2.72	1,945	14.16	1,351	9.84	13,733	49,416	27.80%	Labour
Glasgow Shettleston	516	5.36	4,333	45.05	568	5.91	450	4.68	643	6.69	272	2.83	1,528	15.89	1,308	13.60	9,618	45,386	21.20%	Labour
Glasgow, Springburn	617	5.68	5,214	48.01	603	5.55	515	4.74	622	5.73	296	2.73	1,682	15.49	1,311	12.07	10,860	48,223	22.50%	Labour
Gordon	4,446	24.46	2,011	11.06	4,221	23.22	1,386	7.62	1,048	5.76	204	1.12	3,837	21.11	1,026	5.64	18,179	62,200	29.20%	Conservative
Greenock and Inverclyde	1,420	11.02	4,089	31.73	1,830	14.20	852	6.61	798	6.19	225	1.75	2,309	17.92	1,364	10.58	12,887	44,887	28.70%	Labour
Hamilton North and Bellshill	1,337	10.12	5,575	42.21	1,018	7.71	749	5.67	555	4.20	298	2.26	2,413	18.27	1,264	9.57	13,209	51,908	25.40%	Labour
Hamilton South	1,121	9.63	4,711	40.48	928	7.97	714	6.13	541	4.65	224	1.92	2,245	19.29	1,155	9.92	11,639	46,140	25.20%	Labour
Inverness East, Nairn and Lochaber	4,051	17.65	4,345	18.93	4,112	17.91	1,740	7.58	1,768	7.70	259	1.13	4,606	20.06	2,076	9.04	22,957	68,149	33.70%	Scottish National Party
Kilmarnock and Loudoun	2,746	15.25	5,952	33.06	1,350	7.50	1,192	6.62	765	4.25	295	1.64	4,613	25.62	1,091	6.06	18,004	60,820	29.60%	Labour
Kirkcaldy	1,605	12.15	4,617	34.95	1,292	9.78	1,145	8.67	734	5.56	258	1.95	2,620	19.83	938	7.10	13,209	49,286	26.80%	Labour
Linlithgow	1,629	10.77	5,041	33.34	1,386	9.17	1,020	6.75	975	6.45	389	2.57	3,563	23.56	1,119	7.40	15,122	53,794	28.10%	Labour
Livingston	1,683	9.75	5,435	31.50	1,694	9.82	1,293	7.49	1,270	7.36	424	2.46	4,096	23.74	1,358	7.87	17,253	64,989	26.50%	Labour
Midlothian	1,502	10.78	5,460	39.19	1,429	10.26	781	5.61	1,007	7.23	219	1.57	2,511	18.02	1,023	7.34	13,932	47,619	29.30%	Labour
Moray	4,102	21.93	2,733	14.61	2,102	11.24	1,796	9.60	1,168	6.24	332	1.77	5,280	28.22	1,196	6.39	18,709	58,294	32.10%	Scottish National Party
Motherwell and Wishaw	1,456	10.53	5,978	43.22	922	6.67	812	5.87	520	3.76	293	2.12	2,470	17.86	1,380	9.98	13,831	51,777	26.70%	Labour
North East Fife	5,210	27.70	1,651	8.78	5,632	29.94	1,579	8.40	1,500	7.98	206	1.10	2,086	11.09	944	5.02	18,808	58,692	32.00%	Liberal Democrat
North Tayside	6,700	29.18	1,967	8.57	2,056	8.95	1,703	7.42	1,207	5.26	252	1.10	7,930	34.54	1,146	4.99	22,961	60,989	37.60%	Scottish National Party
Ochil	2,766	16.42	4,704	27.92	1,857	11.02	1,070	6.35	1,073	6.37	259	1.54	4,026	23.90	1,093	6.49	16,848	54,930	30.70%	Labour
Orkney and Shetland	1,437	16.88	889	10.44	2,139	25.12	846	9.94	817	9.59	121	1.42	1,306	15.34	960	11.27	8,515	32,329	26.30%	Liberal Democrat
Paisley North	1,186	8.69	4,635	33.96	1,399	10.25	739	5.41	625	4.58	328	2.40	3,499	25.64	1,238	9.07	13,649	43,501	31.40%	Labour
Paisley South	1,325	8.69	5,498	36.05	1,801	11.81	757	4.96	754	4.94	273	1.79	3,475	22.79	1,368	8.97	15,251	48,068	31.70%	Labour
Perth	6,352	29.68	2,746	12.83	2,466	11.52	1,635	7.64	1,480	6.92	286	1.34	4,965	23.20	1,472	6.88	21,402	60,690	35.30%	Conservative
Ross, Skye and Inverness West	2,577	13.44	2,502	13.05	5,060	26.39	1,609	8.39	1,749	9.12	203	1.06	3,294	17.18	2,181	11.37	19,175	56,840	33.70%	Liberal Democrat
Roxburgh and Berwickshire	4,535	31.64	1,728	12.06	3,180	22.19	1,561	10.89	952	6.64	204	1.42	1,474	10.28	700	4.88	14,334	43,684	32.80%	Conservative
Stirling	5,144	26.18	4,268	21.72	2,586	13.16	1,125	5.73	1,799	9.16	217	1.10	3,272	16.65	1,235	6.29	19,646	51,275	38.30%	Conservative
Strathkelvin and Bearsden	3,657	17.44	5,592	26.67	3,100	14.79	1,444	6.89	1,353	6.45	401	1.91	3,557	16.97	1,862	8.88	20,966	61,422	34.10%	Labour
Tweeddale, Ettrick and Lauderdale	4,142	23.31	2,880	16.20	3,923	22.07	1,188	6.68	1,550	8.72	202	1.14	2,775	15.61	1,113	6.26	17,773	54,216	32.80%	Conservative
West Aberdeenshire and Kincardine	5,973	28.73	2,105	10.13	5,204	25.03	1,505	7.24	1,367	6.58	204	0.98	3,304	15.89	1,128	5.43	20,790	63,649	32.70%	Conservative
West Renfrewshire	3,070	18.83	4,370	26.81	1,820	11.17	964	5.91	1,007	6.18	284	1.74	3,641	22.34	1,144	7.02	16,300	50,337	32.40%	Labour
Western Isles	533	8.51	1,481	23.64	447	7.14	403	6.43	260	4.15	53	0.85	1,810	28.90	1,277	20.39	6,264	21,104	29.70%	Scottish National Party

== Wales ==
European Parliament election, 2004 (Wales)

Local authority	Con		Lab		Lib Dem		UKIP		Green		BNP		Respect		PC		Others		Total	Electorate		Party won in 2004
Local authority	#	%	#	%	#	%	#	%	#	%	#	%	#	%	#	%	#	%	Total	Electorate	Turnout	Party won in 2004
Blaenau Gwent	1,589	6.93	12,405	54.13	2,004	8.74	1,903	8.30	561	2.45	885	3.86	125	0.55	2,627	11.46	820	3.58	22,919	52,341	43.80%	Labour
Bridgend	6,348	17.51	14,062	38.78	4,223	11.65	3,865	10.66	1,150	3.17	940	2.59	199	0.55	4,535	12.51	935	2.58	36,257	102,777	35.30%	Labour
Caerphilly	4,363	8.82	22,161	44.79	2,701	5.46	4,243	8.58	1,357	2.74	1,833	3.70	200	0.40	9,696	19.60	2,927	5.92	49,481	124,525	39.70%	Labour
Cardiff	20,984	22.99	26,127	28.63	17,555	19.24	8,078	8.85	4,210	4.61	2,574	2.82	998	1.09	9,119	9.99	1,610	1.76	91,255	237,562	38.40%	Labour
Carmarthenshire	9,014	14.59	18,719	30.29	3,118	5.05	5,555	8.99	2,084	3.37	1,373	2.22	285	0.46	20,172	32.65	1,470	2.38	61,790	133,307	46.40%	Plaid Cymru
Ceredigion	4,264	15.57	3,775	13.78	3,438	12.55	2,694	9.84	1,167	4.26	454	1.66	148	0.54	10,756	39.27	691	2.52	27,387	53,540	51.20%	Plaid Cymru
Conwy	9,358	25.59	8,674	23.72	3,417	9.34	4,476	12.24	1,216	3.33	1,118	3.06	164	0.45	6,841	18.71	1,304	3.57	36,568	87,500	41.80%	Conservative
Denbighshire	8,560	28.90	7,883	26.61	2,468	8.33	3,227	10.89	1,036	3.50	867	2.93	137	0.46	4,788	16.16	658	2.22	29,624	67,686	43.80%	Conservative
Flintshire	9,619	22.36	14,802	34.41	4,477	10.41	5,968	13.87	1,424	3.31	1,732	4.03	223	0.52	3,965	9.22	803	1.87	43,013	114,327	37.60%	Labour
Gwynedd	4,974	12.60	7,819	19.81	1,768	4.48	2,973	7.53	1,552	3.93	686	1.74	204	0.52	18,498	46.87	996	2.52	39,470	92,818	42.50%	Plaid Cymru
Isle of Anglesey	4,867	19.35	5,555	22.08	1,427	5.67	2,503	9.95	754	3.00	670	2.66	95	0.38	8,779	34.90	508	2.02	25,158	51,382	49.00%	Plaid Cymru
Merthyr Tydfil	1,387	8.37	7,953	47.97	1,120	6.76	1,726	10.41	523	3.15	557	3.36	97	0.59	2,464	14.86	751	4.53	16,578	42,737	38.80%	Labour
Monmouthshire	12,218	37.62	7,621	23.46	3,532	10.87	4,172	12.84	1,451	4.47	819	2.52	147	0.45	1,800	5.54	721	2.22	32,481	67,657	48.00%	Conservative
Neath Port Talbot	4,117	9.15	19,850	44.14	3,683	8.19	3,732	8.30	1,553	3.45	1,438	3.20	308	0.68	9,115	20.27	1,176	2.61	44,972	108,619	41.40%	Labour
Newport	9,333	24.63	12,848	33.91	4,308	11.37	4,920	12.98	351	0.93	1,617	4.27	260	0.69	3,509	9.26	745	1.97	37,891	104,505	36.30%	Labour
Pembrokeshire	11,995	27.36	12,119	27.64	4,016	9.16	5,246	11.97	1,804	4.11	981	2.24	207	0.47	6,672	15.22	801	1.83	43,841	89,537	49.00%	Labour
Powys	13,794	30.41	7,171	15.81	9,722	21.43	6,448	14.21	2,288	5.04	1,012	2.23	236	0.52	3,970	8.75	725	1.60	45,366	101,759	44.60%	Conservative
Rhondda Cynon Taf	4,915	7.60	32,203	49.80	3,792	5.86	4,600	7.11	1,775	2.74	1,876	2.90	308	0.48	13,596	21.02	1,602	2.48	64,667	157,269	41.10%	Labour
Swansea	12,468	18.66	21,411	32.05	9,911	14.84	7,608	11.39	2,976	4.45	2,088	3.13	617	0.92	8,445	12.64	1,283	1.92	66,807	176,138	37.90%	Labour
Torfaen	4,133	15.46	11,393	42.60	2,685	10.04	3,608	13.49	879	3.29	1,026	3.84	137	0.51	2,121	7.93	760	2.84	26,742	68,623	39.00%	Labour
Vale of Glamorgan	12,213	31.67	10,646	27.60	2,904	7.53	4,711	12.21	1,628	4.22	1,094	2.84	196	0.51	4,558	11.82	619	1.60	38,569	89,132	43.30%	Conservative
Wrexham	7,258	19.70	12,613	34.23	3,847	10.44	4,421	12.00	1,022	2.77	1,495	4.06	136	0.37	3,862	10.48	2,196	5.96	36,850	94,908	38.80%	Labour
