= List of MPs elected in the 1997 United Kingdom general election =

1997–2001 Parliament of the United Kingdom
←	1992–1997 Parliament	2001–2005 Parliament	→
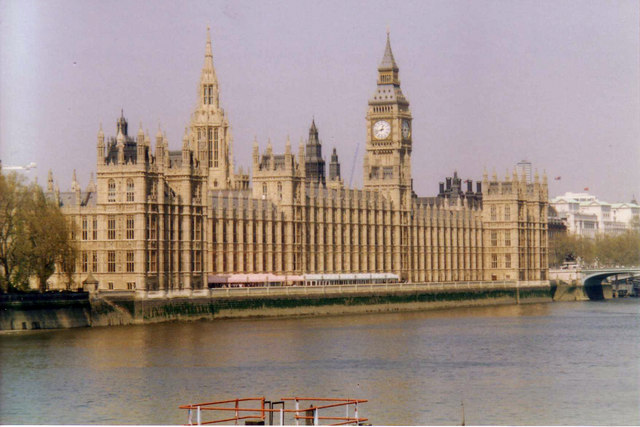
- Palace of Westminster in 1999

Overview
- Legislative body: Parliament of the United Kingdom
- Term: 1 May 1997 – 14 May 2001
- Election: 1997 United Kingdom general election
- Government: First Blair ministry

House of Commons
- Members: 659
- Speaker: Betty Boothroyd; Michael Martin
- Leader: Ann Taylor; Margaret Beckett
- Prime Minister: Tony Blair
- Leader of the Opposition: John Major; William Hague
- Third-party leader: Paddy Ashdown; Charles Kennedy

House of Lords
- Lord Chancellor: Baron Irvine of Lairg

Crown-in-Parliament Elizabeth II

Sessions
- 1st: 7 May 1997 – 19 November 1998
- 2nd: 24 November 1998 – 11 November 1999
- 3rd: 17 November 1999 – 30 November 2000
- 4th: 5 December 2000 – 11 May 2001

This is a list of members of Parliament (MPs) elected to the House of Commons at the 1997 general election, held on 1 May. The list is arranged by constituency. New MPs elected since the general election are noted at the bottom of the page.

During the 1997–2001 Parliament, Betty Boothroyd and Michael Martin served as Speaker, Tony Blair served as Prime Minister, and John Major and William Hague served as Leader of the Opposition. Dissolution of Parliament was on 14 May 2001.

== Sub-lists ==
- List of MPs for constituencies in Scotland (1997–2001)
- List of MPs for constituencies in Wales (1997–2001)

== Composition ==
These representative diagrams show the composition of the parties in the 1997 general election.

Note: The Scottish National Party and Plaid Cymru sit together as a party group, while Sinn Féin has not taken its seats. This is not the official seating plan of the House of Commons, which has five rows of benches on each side, with the government party to the right of the speaker and opposition parties to the left, but with room for only around two-thirds of MPs to sit at any one time.

Affiliation	Members
Labour Party	418
Conservative Party	165
Liberal Democrats	46
Ulster Unionist Party	10
Scottish National Party	6
Plaid Cymru	4
Social Democratic and Labour Party	3
Democratic Unionist Party	2
Sinn Féin	2
Independent	1
UK Unionist Party	1
The Speaker	1
Total	659
Notional government majority	179
Effective government majority	180

The effective majority is slightly higher as Sinn Féin members choose not to take up their seats, and the speaker doesn't usually vote. Speaker Betty Boothroyd was included in a Labour notional majority for statistical purposes.

Constituency	MP	Party
=== A ===
Aberavon	John Morris	Labour
Aberdeen Central	Frank Doran	Labour
Aberdeen North	Malcolm Savidge	Labour
Aberdeen South	Anne Begg	Labour
Aberdeenshire West and Kincardine	Sir Robert Smith	Liberal Democrat
Airdrie and Shotts	Helen Liddell	Labour
Aldershot	Gerald Howarth	Conservative
Aldridge-Brownhills	Richard Shepherd	Conservative
Altrincham and Sale West	Graham Brady	Conservative
Alyn and Deeside	Barry Jones	Labour
Amber Valley	Judy Mallaber	Labour
Angus	Andrew Welsh	Scottish National Party
Antrim East	Roy Beggs	Ulster Unionist
Argyll and Bute	Hon. Ray Michie	Liberal Democrat
Arundel and South Downs	Howard Flight	Conservative
Ashfield	Geoff Hoon	Labour
Ashford	Damian Green	Conservative
Ashton-under-Lyne	Robert Sheldon	Labour
Aylesbury	David Lidington	Conservative
Ayr	Sandra Osborne	Labour
=== B ===
Banbury	Tony Baldry	Conservative
Banff and Buchan	Alex Salmond	Scottish National Party
Barking	Margaret Hodge	Labour
Barnsley Central	Eric Illsley	Labour
Barnsley East and Mexborough	Jeffrey Ennis	Labour
Barnsley West and Penistone	Michael Clapham	Labour
Barrow and Furness	John Hutton	Labour
Basildon	Angela Smith	Labour Co-operative
Basingstoke	Andrew Hunter	Conservative
Bassetlaw	Joe Ashton	Labour
Bath	Don Foster	Liberal Democrat
Batley and Spen	Mike Wood	Labour
Battersea	Martin Linton	Labour
Beaconsfield	Dominic Grieve	Conservative
Beckenham	Piers Merchant	Conservative
Bedford	Patrick Hall	Labour
Belfast East	Peter Robinson	Democratic Unionist
Belfast North	Cecil Walker	Ulster Unionist
Belfast South	Rev. Martin Smyth	Ulster Unionist
Belfast West	Gerry Adams	Sinn Féin
Berwick-upon-Tweed	Alan Beith	Liberal Democrat
Bethnal Green and Bow	Oona King	Labour
Beverley and Holderness	James Cran	Conservative
Bexhill and Battle	Charles Wardle	Conservative
Bexleyheath and Crayford	Nigel Beard	Labour
Billericay	Teresa Gorman	Conservative
Birkenhead	Frank Field	Labour
Birmingham, Edgbaston	Gisela Stuart	Labour
Birmingham, Erdington	Robin Corbett	Labour
Birmingham, Hall Green	Steve McCabe	Labour
Birmingham, Hodge Hill	Terry Davis	Labour
Birmingham, Ladywood	Clare Short	Labour
Birmingham, Northfield	Richard Burden	Labour
Birmingham, Perry Barr	Jeff Rooker	Labour
Birmingham, Selly Oak	Dr Lynne Jones	Labour
Birmingham, Sparkbrook and Small Heath	Roger Godsiff	Labour
Birmingham, Yardley	Estelle Morris	Labour
Bishop Auckland	Derek Foster	Labour
Blaby	Andrew Robathan	Conservative
Blackburn	Jack Straw	Labour
Blackpool North and Fleetwood	Joan Humble	Labour
Blackpool South	Gordon Marsden	Labour
Blaenau Gwent	Llew Smith	Labour
Blaydon	John McWilliam	Labour
Blyth Valley	Ronnie Campbell	Labour
Bognor Regis and Littlehampton	Nick Gibb	Conservative
Bolsover	Dennis Skinner	Labour
Bolton North East	David Crausby	Labour
Bolton South East	Dr Brian Iddon	Labour
Bolton West	Ruth Kelly	Labour
Bootle	Joe Benton	Labour
Boston and Skegness	Sir Richard Body	Conservative
Bosworth	David Tredinnick	Conservative
Bournemouth East	David Atkinson	Conservative
Bournemouth West	Sir John Butterfill	Conservative
Bracknell	Andrew Mackay	Conservative
Bradford North	Terry Rooney	Labour
Bradford South	Gerry Sutcliffe	Labour
Bradford West	Marsha Singh	Labour
Braintree	Alan Hurst	Labour
Brecon and Radnorshire	Richard Livsey	Liberal Democrat
Brent East	Ken Livingstone	Labour
Brent North	Barry Gardiner	Labour
Brent South	Paul Boateng	Labour
Brentford and Isleworth	Ann Keen	Labour
Brentwood and Ongar	Eric Pickles	Conservative
Bridgend	Win Griffiths	Labour
Bridgwater	Tom King	Conservative
Brigg and Goole	Ian Cawsey	Labour
Brighton Kemptown	Dr Des Turner	Labour
Brighton Pavilion	David Lepper	Labour Co-operative
Bristol East	Jean Corston	Labour
Bristol North West	Dr Doug Naysmith	Labour Co-operative
Bristol South	Dawn Primarolo	Labour
Bristol West	Valerie Davey	Labour
Bromley and Chislehurst	Eric Forth	Conservative
Bromsgrove	Julie Kirkbride	Conservative
Broxbourne	Marion Roe	Conservative
Broxtowe	Dr Nick Palmer	Labour
Buckingham	John Bercow	Conservative
Burnley	Peter Pike	Labour
Burton	Janet Dean	Labour
Bury North	David Chaytor	Labour
Bury South	Ivan Lewis	Labour
Bury St Edmunds	David Ruffley	Conservative
=== C ===
Caernarfon	Dafydd Wigley	Plaid Cymru
Caerphilly	Ron Davies	Labour
Caithness, Sutherland and Easter Ross	Robert Maclennan	Liberal Democrat
Calder Valley	Christine McCafferty	Labour
Camberwell and Peckham	Harriet Harman	Labour
Cambridge	Anne Campbell	Labour
Cannock Chase	Dr Tony Wright	Labour
Canterbury	Julian Brazier	Conservative
Cardiff Central	Jon Owen Jones	Labour Co-operative
Cardiff North	Julie Morgan	Labour
Cardiff South and Penarth	Alun Michael	Labour Co-operative
Cardiff West	Rhodri Morgan	Labour
Carlisle	Eric Martlew	Labour
Carmarthen East and Dinefwr	Alan Williams	Labour
Carmarthen West and South Pembrokeshire	Nick Ainger	Labour
Carrick, Cumnock and Doon Valley	George Foulkes	Labour Co-operative
Carshalton and Wallington	Tom Brake	Liberal Democrat
Castle Point	Christine Butler	Labour
Central Suffolk and North Ipswich	Sir Michael Lord	Conservative
Ceredigion	Cynog Dafis	Plaid Cymru
Charnwood	Stephen Dorrell	Conservative
Chatham and Aylesford	Jonathan Shaw	Labour
Cheadle	Stephen Day	Conservative
Cheltenham	Nigel Jones	Liberal Democrat
Chesham and Amersham	Cheryl Gillan	Conservative
Chester, City of	Christine Russell	Labour
Chesterfield	Tony Benn	Labour
Chichester	Andrew Tyrie	Conservative
Chingford and Woodford Green	Iain Duncan Smith	Conservative
Chipping Barnet	Sir Sydney Chapman	Conservative
Chorley	Lindsay Hoyle	Labour
Christchurch	Christopher Chope	Conservative
Cities of London and Westminster	Hon. Peter Brooke	Conservative
Cleethorpes	Shona McIsaac	Labour
Clwyd South	Martyn Jones	Labour
Clwyd West	Gareth Thomas	Labour
Clydebank and Milngavie	Tony Worthington	Labour
Clydesdale	Jimmy Hood	Labour
Coatbridge and Chryston	Tom Clarke	Labour
Colchester	Bob Russell	Liberal Democrat
Colne Valley	Kali Mountford	Labour
Congleton	Ann Winterton	Conservative
Conwy	Betty Williams	Labour
Copeland	Jack Cunningham	Labour
Corby	Phil Hope	Labour Co-operative
Cotswold	Geoffrey Clifton-Brown	Conservative
Coventry North East	Bob Ainsworth	Labour
Coventry North West	Geoffrey Robinson	Labour
Coventry South	Jim Cunningham	Labour
Crawley	Laura Moffatt	Labour
Crewe and Nantwich	Gwyneth Dunwoody	Labour
Crosby	Claire Curtis-Thomas	Labour
Croydon Central	Geraint Davies	Labour
Croydon North	Malcolm Wicks	Labour
Croydon South	Richard Ottaway	Conservative
Cumbernauld and Kilsyth	Rosemary McKenna	Labour
Cunninghame North	Brian Wilson	Labour
Cunninghame South	Brian Donohoe	Labour
Cynon Valley	Ann Clwyd	Labour
=== D ===
Dagenham	Judith Church	Labour
Darlington	Alan Milburn	Labour
Dartford	Dr Howard Stoate	Labour
Daventry	Tim Boswell	Conservative
Delyn	David Hanson	Labour
Denton and Reddish	Andrew Bennett	Labour
Derby North	Bob Laxton	Labour
Derby South	Margaret Beckett	Labour
Devizes	Michael Ancram	Conservative
Devon East	Sir Peter Emery	Conservative
Dewsbury	Ann Taylor	Labour
Don Valley	Caroline Flint	Labour
Doncaster Central	Rosie Winterton	Labour
Doncaster North	Kevin Hughes	Labour
Dover	Gwyn Prosser	Labour
Dudley North	Ross Cranston	Labour
Dudley South	Ian Pearson	Labour
Dulwich and West Norwood	Tessa Jowell	Labour
Dumbarton	John McFall	Labour Co-operative
Dumfries	Russell Brown	Labour
Dundee East	John McAllion	Labour
Dundee West	Ernie Ross	Labour
Dunfermline East	Gordon Brown	Labour
Dunfermline West	Rachel Squire	Labour
Durham, City of	Gerry Steinberg	Labour
=== E ===
Ealing, Acton and Shepherd's Bush	Clive Soley	Labour
Ealing North	Stephen Pound	Labour
Ealing, Southall	Piara Khabra	Labour
Easington	John Cummings	Labour
East Antrim	Roy Beggs	Ulster Unionist
East Ham	Stephen Timms	Labour
East Kilbride	Adam Ingram	Labour
East Lothian	John Home Robertson	Labour
East Surrey	Peter Ainsworth	Conservative
East Worthing and Shoreham	Tim Loughton	Conservative
East Yorkshire	John Townend	Conservative
Eastbourne	Nigel Waterson	Conservative
Eastleigh	David Chidgey	Liberal Democrat
Eastwood	Jim Murphy	Labour
Eccles	Ian Stewart	Labour
Eddisbury	Alastair Goodlad	Conservative
Edinburgh Central	Alistair Darling	Labour
Edinburgh East and Musselburgh	Gavin Strang	Labour
Edinburgh North and Leith	Malcolm Chisholm	Labour
Edinburgh Pentlands	Dr Lynda Clark	Labour
Edinburgh South	Nigel Griffiths	Labour
Edinburgh West	Donald Gorrie	Liberal Democrat
Edmonton	Andy Love	Labour Co-operative
Ellesmere Port and Neston	Andrew Miller	Labour
Elmet	Colin Burgon	Labour
Eltham	Clive Efford	Labour
Enfield North	Joan Ryan	Labour
Enfield, Southgate	Stephen Twigg	Labour
Epping Forest	Eleanor Laing	Conservative
Epsom and Ewell	Hon. Sir Archie Hamilton	Conservative
Erewash	Liz Blackman	Labour
Erith and Thamesmead	John Austin	Labour
Esher and Walton	Ian Taylor	Conservative
Exeter	Ben Bradshaw	Labour
=== F ===
Falkirk East	Michael Connarty	Labour
Falkirk West	Dennis Canavan	Labour
Falmouth and Camborne	Candy Atherton	Labour
Fareham	Peter Lloyd	Conservative
Faversham and Mid Kent	Andrew Rowe	Conservative
Feltham and Heston	Alan Keen	Labour Co-operative
Fermanagh and South Tyrone	Ken Maginnis	Ulster Unionist
Fife Central	Henry McLeish	Labour
Finchley and Golders Green	Dr Rudi Vis	Labour
Folkestone and Hythe	Michael Howard	Conservative
Forest of Dean	Diana Organ	Labour
Foyle	John Hume	Social Democratic and Labour
Fylde	Michael Jack	Conservative
=== G ===
Gainsborough	Edward Leigh	Conservative
Galloway and Upper Nithsdale	Alasdair Morgan	Scottish National Party
Gateshead East and Washington West	Joyce Quin	Labour
Gedling	Vernon Coaker	Labour
Gillingham	Paul Clark	Labour
Glasgow, Anniesland	Donald Dewar	Labour
Glasgow, Baillieston	Jimmy Wray	Labour
Glasgow, Cathcart	John Maxton	Labour
Glasgow, Govan	Mohammad Sarwar	Labour
Glasgow, Kelvin	George Galloway	Labour
Glasgow, Maryhill	Maria Fyfe	Labour
Glasgow, Pollok	Ian Davidson	Labour Co-operative
Glasgow, Rutherglen	Thomas McAvoy	Labour Co-operative
Glasgow, Shettleston	David Marshall	Labour
Glasgow, Springburn	Michael Martin	Labour
Gloucester	Tess Kingham	Labour
Gordon	Malcolm Bruce	Liberal Democrat
Gosport	Peter Viggers	Conservative
Gower	Martin Caton	Labour
Grantham and Stamford	Quentin Davies	Conservative
Gravesham	Chris Pond	Labour
Great Grimsby	Austin Mitchell	Labour
Great Yarmouth	Tony Wright	Labour
Greenock and Inverclyde	Dr Norman Godman	Labour
Greenwich and Woolwich	Nick Raynsford	Labour
Guildford	Nick St Aubyn	Conservative
=== H ===
Hackney North and Stoke Newington	Diane Abbott	Labour
Hackney South and Shoreditch	Brian Sedgemore	Labour
Halesowen and Rowley Regis	Sylvia Heal	Labour
Halifax	Alice Mahon	Labour
Haltemprice and Howden	David Davis	Conservative
Halton	Derek Twigg	Labour
Hamilton North and Bellshill	John Reid	Labour
Hamilton South	George Robertson	Labour
Hammersmith and Fulham	Iain Coleman	Labour
Hampshire East	Michael Mates	Conservative
Hampstead and Highgate	Glenda Jackson	Labour
Harborough	Edward Garnier	Conservative
Harlow	Bill Rammell	Labour
Harrogate and Knaresborough	Phil Willis	Liberal Democrat
Harrow East	Tony McNulty	Labour
Harrow West	Gareth Thomas	Labour
Hartlepool	Peter Mandelson	Labour
Harwich	Ivan Henderson	Labour
Hastings and Rye	Michael Foster	Labour
Havant	David Willetts	Conservative
Hayes and Harlington	John McDonnell	Labour
Hazel Grove	Andrew Stunell	Liberal Democrat
Hemel Hempstead	Tony McWalter	Labour Co-operative
Hemsworth	Jon Trickett	Labour
Hendon	Andrew Dismore	Labour
Henley	Michael Heseltine	Conservative
Hereford	Paul Keetch	Liberal Democrat
Hertford and Stortford	Bowen Wells	Conservative
Hertsmere	James Clappison	Conservative
Hexham	Peter Atkinson	Conservative
Heywood and Middleton	Jim Dobbin	Labour Co-operative
High Peak	Tom Levitt	Labour
Hitchin and Harpenden	Peter Lilley	Conservative
Holborn and St Pancras	Frank Dobson	Labour
Hornchurch	John Cryer	Labour
Hornsey and Wood Green	Barbara Roche	Labour
Horsham	Hon. Francis Maude	Conservative
Houghton and Washington East	Fraser Kemp	Labour
Hove	Ivor Caplin	Labour
Huddersfield	Barry Sheerman	Labour Co-operative
Huntingdon	John Major	Conservative
Hyndburn	Greg Pope	Labour
=== I ===
Ilford North	Linda Perham	Labour
Ilford South	Mike Gapes	Labour Co-operative
Inverness East, Nairn and Lochaber	David Stewart	Labour
Ipswich	Jamie Cann	Labour
Isle of Wight	Peter Brand	Liberal Democrat
Islington North	Jeremy Corbyn	Labour
Islington South and Finsbury	Chris Smith	Labour
Islwyn	Don Touhig	Labour Co-operative
=== J ===
Jarrow	Stephen Hepburn	Labour
=== K ===
Keighley	Ann Cryer	Labour
Kensington and Chelsea	Alan Clark	Conservative
Kettering	Phil Sawford	Labour
Kilmarnock and Loudoun	Des Browne	Labour
Kingston and Surbiton	Edward Davey	Liberal Democrat
Kingston upon Hull East	John Prescott	Labour
Kingston upon Hull North	Kevin McNamara	Labour
Kingston upon Hull West and Hessle	Alan Johnson	Labour
Kingswood	Roger Berry	Labour
Kirkcaldy	Dr Lewis Moonie	Labour Co-operative
Knowsley North and Sefton East	George Howarth	Labour
Knowsley South	Edward O'Hara	Labour
=== L ===
Lagan Valley	Jeffrey Donaldson	Ulster Unionist
Lancaster and Wyre	Hilton Dawson	Labour
Leeds Central	Derek Fatchett	Labour
Leeds East	George Mudie	Labour
Leeds North East	Fabian Hamilton	Labour
Leeds North West	Harold Best	Labour
Leeds West	John Battle	Labour
Leicester East	Keith Vaz	Labour
Leicester South	Jim Marshall	Labour
Leicester West	Patricia Hewitt	Labour
Leigh	Lawrence Cunliffe	Labour
Leominster	Peter Temple-Morris	Conservative
Lewes	Norman Baker	Liberal Democrat
Lewisham, Deptford	Joan Ruddock	Labour
Lewisham East	Bridget Prentice	Labour
Lewisham West	Jim Dowd	Labour
Leyton and Wanstead	Harry Cohen	Labour
Lichfield	Michael Fabricant	Conservative
Lincoln	Gillian Merron	Labour
Linlithgow	Tam Dalyell	Labour
Liverpool, Garston	Maria Eagle	Labour
Liverpool, Riverside	Louise Ellman	Labour Co-operative
Liverpool, Walton	Peter Kilfoyle	Labour
Liverpool, Wavertree	Jane Kennedy	Labour
Liverpool, West Derby	Bob Wareing	Labour
Livingston	Robin Cook	Labour
Llanelli	Denzil Davies	Labour
Londonderry East	William Ross	Ulster Unionist
Loughborough	Andy Reed	Labour Co-operative
Louth and Horncastle	Sir Peter Tapsell	Conservative
Ludlow	Christopher Gill	Conservative
Luton North	Kelvin Hopkins	Labour
Luton South	Margaret Moran	Labour
=== M ===
Macclesfield	Sir Nicholas Winterton	Conservative
Maidenhead	Theresa May	Conservative
Maidstone and The Weald	Ann Widdecombe	Conservative
Makerfield	Ian McCartney	Labour
Maldon and East Chelmsford	John Whittingdale	Conservative
Manchester Central	Tony Lloyd	Labour
Manchester, Blackley	Graham Stringer	Labour
Manchester, Gorton	Gerald Kaufman	Labour
Manchester, Withington	Keith Bradley	Labour
Mansfield	Alan Meale	Labour
Medway	Robert Marshall-Andrews	Labour
Meirionnydd Nant Conwy	Elfyn Llwyd	Plaid Cymru
Meriden	Caroline Spelman	Conservative
Merthyr Tydfil and Rhymney	Ted Rowlands	Labour
Mid Bedfordshire	Jonathan Sayeed	Conservative
Mid Dorset and North Poole	Christopher Fraser	Conservative
Mid Norfolk	Keith Simpson	Conservative
Mid Sussex	Hon. Nicholas Soames	Conservative
Mid Ulster	Martin McGuinness	Sinn Féin
Mid Worcestershire	Peter Luff	Conservative
Middlesbrough	Sir Stuart Bell	Labour
Middlesbrough South and East Cleveland	Dr Ashok Kumar	Labour
Midlothian	Eric Clarke	Labour
Milton Keynes South West	Dr Phyllis Starkey	Labour
Mitcham and Morden	Siobhain McDonagh	Labour
Mole Valley	Sir Paul Beresford	Conservative
Monmouth	Huw Edwards	Labour
Montgomeryshire	Lembit Öpik	Liberal Democrat
Moray	Margaret Ewing	Scottish National Party
Morecambe and Lunesdale	Geraldine Smith	Labour
Morley and Rothwell	John Gunnell	Labour
Motherwell and Wishaw	Frank Roy	Labour
=== N ===
Neath	Peter Hain	Labour
New Forest East	Dr Julian Lewis	Conservative
New Forest West	Desmond Swayne	Conservative
Newark	Fiona Jones	Labour
Newbury	David Rendel	Liberal Democrat
Newcastle upon Tyne Central	Jim Cousins	Labour
Newcastle upon Tyne East and Wallsend	Nick Brown	Labour
Newcastle upon Tyne North	Doug Henderson	Labour
Newcastle-under-Lyme	Llin Golding	Labour
Newport East	Alan Howarth	Labour
Newport West	Paul Flynn	Labour
Newry and Armagh	Seamus Mallon	Social Democratic and Labour
Normanton	Bill O'Brien	Labour
North Antrim	Rev. Ian Paisley	Democratic Unionist
North Cornwall	Paul Tyler	Liberal Democrat
North Devon	Nick Harvey	Liberal Democrat
North Dorset	Robert Walter	Conservative
North Down	Robert McCartney	United Kingdom Unionist
North Durham	Giles Radice	Labour
North East Bedfordshire	Sir Nicholas Lyell	Conservative
North East Cambridgeshire	Malcolm Moss	Conservative
North East Derbyshire	Harry Barnes	Labour
North East Fife	Sir Menzies Campbell	Liberal Democrat
North East Hampshire	James Arbuthnot	Conservative
North East Hertfordshire	Oliver Heald	Conservative
North East Milton Keynes	Brian White	Labour
North Essex	Bernard Jenkin	Conservative
North Norfolk	David Prior	Conservative
North Shropshire	Owen Paterson	Conservative
North Southwark and Bermondsey	Simon Hughes	Liberal Democrat
North Swindon	Michael Wills	Labour
North Tayside	John Swinney	Scottish National Party
North Thanet	Roger Gale	Conservative
North Tyneside	Stephen Byers	Labour
North Warwickshire	Mike O'Brien	Labour
North West Cambridgeshire	Sir Brian Mawhinney	Conservative
North West Durham	Hilary Armstrong	Labour
North West Hampshire	Sir George Young, 6th Baronet	Conservative
North West Leicestershire	David Taylor	Labour Co-operative
North West Norfolk	George Turner	Labour
North Wiltshire	James Gray	Conservative
Northampton North	Sally Keeble	Labour
Northampton South	Tony Clarke	Labour
Northavon	Steve Webb	Liberal Democrat
Norwich North	Dr Ian Gibson	Labour
Norwich South	Charles Clarke	Labour
Nottingham East	John Heppell	Labour
Nottingham North	Graham Allen	Labour
Nottingham South	Alan Simpson	Labour
Nuneaton	Bill Olner	Labour
=== O ===
Ochil	Martin O'Neill	Labour
Ogmore	Sir Ray Powell	Labour
Old Bexley and Sidcup	Sir Edward Heath	Conservative
Oldham East and Saddleworth	Phil Woolas	Labour
Oldham West and Royton	Michael Meacher	Labour
Orkney and Shetland	Jim Wallace	Liberal Democrat
Orpington	John Horam	Conservative
Oxford East	Andrew Smith	Labour
Oxford West and Abingdon	Dr Evan Harris	Liberal Democrat
=== P ===
Paisley North	Irene Adams	Labour
Paisley South	Gordon McMaster	Labour
Pendle	Gordon Prentice	Labour
Penrith and The Border	David Maclean	Conservative
Perth	Roseanna Cunningham	Scottish National Party
Peterborough	Helen Clark	Labour
Plymouth, Devonport	David Jamieson	Labour
Plymouth, Sutton	Linda Gilroy	Labour Co-operative
Pontefract and Castleford	Yvette Cooper	Labour
Pontypridd	Dr Kim Howells	Labour
Poole	Robert Syms	Conservative
Poplar and Canning Town	Jim Fitzpatrick	Labour
Portsmouth North	Syd Rapson	Labour
Portsmouth South	Mike Hancock	Liberal Democrat
Preseli Pembrokeshire	Jackie Lawrence	Labour
Preston	Audrey Wise	Labour
Pudsey	Paul Truswell	Labour
Putney	Tony Colman	Labour
=== R ===
Rayleigh	Dr Michael Clark	Conservative
Reading East	Jane Griffiths	Labour
Reading West	Martin Salter	Labour
Redcar	Dr Mo Mowlam	Labour
Redditch	Jacqui Smith	Labour
Regent's Park and Kensington North	Karen Buck	Labour
Reigate	Crispin Blunt	Conservative
Rhondda	Allan Rogers	Labour
Ribble Valley	Nigel Evans	Conservative
Richmond (Yorkshire)	William Hague	Conservative
Richmond Park	Dr Jenny Tonge	Liberal Democrat
Rochdale	Lorna Fitzsimons	Labour
Rochford and Southend East	Sir Teddy Taylor	Conservative
Romford	Eileen Gordon	Labour
Romsey	Michael Colvin	Conservative
Ross, Skye and Inverness West	Charles Kennedy	Liberal Democrat
Rossendale and Darwen	Janet Anderson	Labour
Rother Valley	Kevin Barron	Labour
Rotherham	Dr Denis MacShane	Labour
Roxburgh and Berwickshire	Sir Archy Kirkwood	Liberal Democrat
Rugby and Kenilworth	Andy King	Labour
Ruislip - Northwood	John Wilkinson	Conservative
Runnymede and Weybridge	Philip Hammond	Conservative
Rushcliffe	Kenneth Clarke	Conservative
Rutland and Melton	Alan Duncan	Conservative
Ryedale	John Greenway	Conservative
=== S ===
Saffron Walden	Sir Alan Haselhurst	Conservative
St Albans	Kerry Pollard	Labour
St Helens North	David Watts	Labour
St Helens South	Gerry Bermingham	Labour
St Ives	Andrew George	Liberal Democrat
Salford	Hazel Blears	Labour
Salisbury	Robert Key	Conservative
Scarborough and Whitby	Lawrie Quinn	Labour
Scunthorpe	Elliot Morley	Labour
Sedgefield	Tony Blair	Labour
Selby	John Grogan	Labour
Sevenoaks	Michael Fallon	Conservative
Sheffield, Attercliffe	Clive Betts	Labour
Sheffield, Brightside	David Blunkett	Labour
Sheffield Central	Richard Caborn	Labour
Sheffield, Hallam	Richard Allan	Liberal Democrat
Sheffield, Heeley	Bill Michie	Labour
Sheffield, Hillsborough	Helen Jackson	Labour
Sherwood	Paddy Tipping	Labour
Shipley	Chris Leslie	Labour
Shrewsbury and Atcham	Paul Marsden	Labour
Sittingbourne and Sheppey	Derek Wyatt	Labour
Skipton and Ripon	David Curry	Conservative
Sleaford and North Hykeham	Hon. Douglas Hogg	Conservative
Slough	Fiona Mactaggart	Labour
Solihull	John Taylor	Conservative
Somerton and Frome	David Heath	Liberal Democrat
South Antrim	Clifford Forsythe	Ulster Unionist
South Cambridgeshire	Andrew Lansley	Conservative
South Derbyshire	Mark Todd	Labour
South Dorset	Ian Bruce	Conservative
South Down	Eddie McGrady	Social Democratic and Labour
South East Cambridgeshire	James Paice	Conservative
South East Cornwall	Colin Breed	Liberal Democrat
South Holland and The Deepings	John Hayes	Conservative
South Norfolk	John MacGregor	Conservative
South Ribble	David Borrow	Labour
South Shields	Dr David Clark	Labour
South Staffordshire	Sir Patrick Cormack	Conservative
South Suffolk	Tim Yeo	Conservative
South Swindon	Julia Drown	Labour
South Thanet	Dr Stephen Ladyman	Labour
South West Bedfordshire	Sir David Madel	Conservative
South West Devon	Gary Streeter	Conservative
South West Hertfordshire	Richard Page	Conservative
South West Norfolk	Gillian Shephard	Conservative
South West Surrey	Virginia Bottomley	Conservative
Southampton Itchen	John Denham	Labour
Southampton Test	Dr Alan Whitehead	Labour
Southend West	David Amess	Conservative
Southport	Ronnie Fearn	Liberal Democrat
Spelthorne	David Wilshire	Conservative
Stafford	David Kidney	Labour
Staffordshire Moorlands	Charlotte Atkins	Labour
Stalybridge and Hyde	Tom Pendry	Labour
Stevenage	Barbara Follett	Labour
Stirling	Anne McGuire	Labour
Stockport	Ann Coffey	Labour
Stockton North	Frank Cook	Labour
Stockton South	Dari Taylor	Labour
Stoke-on-Trent Central	Mark Fisher	Labour
Stoke-on-Trent North	Joan Walley	Labour
Stoke-on-Trent South	George Stevenson	Labour
Stone	William Cash	Conservative
Stourbridge	Debra Shipley	Labour
Strangford	John Taylor	Ulster Unionist
Stratford-on-Avon	John Maples	Conservative
Strathkelvin and Bearsden	Sam Galbraith	Labour
Streatham	Keith Hill	Labour
Stretford and Urmston	Beverley Hughes	Labour
Stroud	David Drew	Labour Co-operative
Suffolk Coastal	John Gummer	Conservative
Sunderland North	Bill Etherington	Labour
Sunderland South	Chris Mullin	Labour
Surrey Heath	Nick Hawkins	Conservative
Sutton and Cheam	Paul Burstow	Liberal Democrat
Sutton Coldfield	Sir Norman Fowler	Conservative
Swansea East	Donald Anderson	Labour
Swansea West	Alan Williams	Labour
=== T ===
Tamworth	Brian Jenkins	Labour
Tatton	Martin Bell	Independent
Taunton	Jackie Ballard	Liberal Democrat
Teignbridge	Patrick Nicholls	Conservative
Telford	Bruce Grocott	Labour
Tewkesbury	Laurence Robertson	Conservative
Thurrock	Andrew Mackinlay	Labour
Tiverton and Honiton	Angela Browning	Conservative
Tonbridge and Malling	Sir John Stanley	Conservative
Tooting	Tom Cox	Labour
Torbay	Adrian Sanders	Liberal Democrat
Torfaen	Paul Murphy	Labour
Torridge and West Devon	John Burnett	Liberal Democrat
Totnes	Anthony Steen	Conservative
Tottenham	Bernie Grant	Labour
Truro and St Austell	Matthew Taylor	Liberal Democrat
Tunbridge Wells	Archie Norman	Conservative
Tweeddale, Ettrick and Lauderdale	Michael Moore	Liberal Democrat
Twickenham	Dr Vincent Cable	Liberal Democrat
Tyne Bridge	David Clelland	Labour
Tynemouth	Alan Campbell	Labour
=== U ===
Upminster	Keith Darvill	Labour
Upper Bann	David Trimble	Ulster Unionist
Uxbridge	Sir Michael Shersby	Conservative
=== V ===
Vale of Clwyd	Chris Ruane	Labour
Vale of Glamorgan	John Smith	Labour
Vale of York	Anne McIntosh	Conservative
Vauxhall	Kate Hoey	Labour
=== W ===
Wakefield	David Hinchliffe	Labour
Wallasey	Angela Eagle	Labour
Walsall North	David Winnick	Labour
Walsall South	Bruce George	Labour
Walthamstow	Neil Gerrard	Labour
Wansbeck	Denis Murphy	Labour
Wansdyke	Dan Norris	Labour
Wantage	Robert Jackson	Conservative
Warley	John Spellar	Labour
Warrington North	Helen Jones	Labour
Warrington South	Helen Southworth	Labour
Warwick and Leamington	James Plaskitt	Labour
Watford	Claire Ward	Labour
Waveney	Bob Blizzard	Labour
Wealden	Sir Geoffrey Johnson-Smith	Conservative
Weaver Vale	Mike Hall	Labour
Wellingborough	Paul Stinchcombe	Labour
Wells	David Heathcoat-Amory	Conservative
Welwyn Hatfield	Melanie Johnson	Labour
Wentworth	John Healey	Labour
West Bromwich East	Peter Snape	Labour
West Bromwich West	Betty Boothroyd	None (Speaker)
West Chelmsford	Simon Burns	Conservative
West Derbyshire	Patrick McLoughlin	Conservative
West Dorset	Oliver Letwin	Conservative
West Ham	Tony Banks	Labour
West Lancashire	Colin Pickthall	Labour
West Renfrewshire	Thomas Graham	Labour
West Suffolk	Richard Spring	Conservative
West Tyrone	William Thompson	Ulster Unionist
West Worcestershire	Sir Michael Spicer	Conservative
Westbury	David Faber	Conservative
Western Isles	Calum Macdonald	Labour
Westmorland and Lonsdale	Tim Collins	Conservative
Weston-super-Mare	Brian Cotter	Liberal Democrat
Wigan	Roger Stott	Labour
Wimbledon	Roger Casale	Labour
Winchester	Mark Oaten ^{1}	Liberal Democrat
Windsor	Michael Trend	Conservative
Wirral South	Ben Chapman	Labour
Wirral West	Stephen Hesford	Labour
Witney	Shaun Woodward	Conservative
Woking	Humfrey Malins	Conservative
Wokingham	John Redwood	Conservative
Wolverhampton North East	Ken Purchase	Labour Co-operative
Wolverhampton South East	Dennis Turner	Labour Co-operative
Wolverhampton South West	Jenny Jones	Labour
Woodspring	Dr Liam Fox	Conservative
Worcester	Mike Foster	Labour
Workington	Dale Campbell-Savours	Labour
Worsley	Terry Lewis	Labour
Worthing West	Peter Bottomley	Conservative
The Wrekin	Peter Bradley	Labour
Wrexham	Dr John Marek	Labour
Wycombe	Sir Ray Whitney	Conservative
Wyre Forest	David Lock	Labour
Wythenshawe and Sale East	Paul Goggins	Labour
=== Y ===
Yeovil	Paddy Ashdown	Liberal Democrat
Ynys Môn (Anglesey)	Ieuan Wyn Jones	Plaid Cymru
York, City of	Hugh Bayley	Labour

Note:

1. The election of Mark Oaten was declared void by the election court on 6 October 1997.

== By-elections ==
See the list of United Kingdom by-elections.
