= Bill Tynan =

British politician

Member of Parliament for Hamilton South
- In office 23 September 1999 – 11 April 2005
- Preceded by: George Robertson
- Succeeded by: Constituency abolished

Personal details
- Born: 18 August 1940 (age 86)
- Party: Labour
- Spouse: Elizabeth Mathieson

William Tynan (born 18 August 1940) is a retired Labour Party politician in the United Kingdom. He was the member of parliament (MP) for Hamilton South from 1999 to 2005, having won the Hamilton South by-election to replace the ennobled George Robertson.

== Early life ==
The son of James and Mary Tynan, he attended St Mungo's Academy, a Catholic (then a grammar school) school in Glasgow. At Stow College on Shamrock Street in Glasgow he studied Mechanical Engineering. He was a Press Toolmaker for 27 years.

Prior to selection as an MP, he was a full-time trade union official with the AEEU from 1988 then Amicus Union.

== Parliamentary career ==
For the 2005 general election, his seat was abolished as part of the reduction in the total number of Scottish seats. Aged 64, he chose to retire rather than contest the election in another constituency.

Bill Tynan's constituency covered Hamilton and Blantyre with an electorate of approximately 53,000. He was re-elected at the 2001 general election with a majority of 10,775.

He was a Member of European Scrutiny Committee, Northern Ireland Affairs Committee, Vice Convener of the Friends of Scottish Racing Parliamentary Group and Chair of the All Party Parliamentary Group on Nuclear Energy. He was successful in bringing a Private Member's Bill on fireworks to Parliament, which was subsequently enacted as the Fireworks Act 2003.

== Personal life ==
His interests include: international development, energy and social justice. He enjoys playing golf and watching football. He married Elizabeth Mathieson on 11 July 1964 and they have three daughters, six grandchildren and live in Hamilton.

Parliament of the United Kingdom
Preceded by George Robertson	Member of Parliament for Hamilton South; 1999–2005	constituency abolished
