= 1999 Hamilton South by-election =

1999 Scottish Parliamentary by-election with record number of candidates

- 23 September 1999
- Turnout: 41.3%
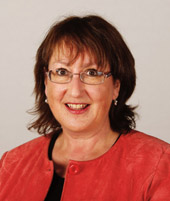
	First party	Second party	Third party
Candidate	Bill Tynan	Annabelle Ewing	Shareen Blackall
Party	Labour	SNP	Scottish Socialist
Popular vote	7,172	6,616	1,847
Percentage	36.9%	34.0%	9.5%
Swing	▼28.7%	▲16.4%	New
	Fourth party	Fifth party
Candidate	Charles Ferguson	Stephen Mungall
Party	Conservative	Independent
Popular vote	1,406	1,075
Percentage	7.2%	5.5%
Swing	▼1.4%	New
MP before election
George Robertson
Labour
Elected MP
Bill Tynan
Labour

A by-election for the United Kingdom parliamentary constituency of Hamilton South was held on 23 September 1999, following the resignation of incumbent Labour Party MP George Robertson upon his appointment as Secretary General of NATO. It was won by Bill Tynan, who held the seat for Labour.

On 4 August 1999, incumbent MP George Robertson was announced as the new NATO Secretary General. This meant that Robertson was required to resign from his seat which he had won at the 1997 general election. The seat had fallen vacant in a Parliamentary recess, and the law does not permit a by-election to be called during a recess if the sitting member resigns by taking the Chiltern Hundreds.

Robertson was elevated to the House of Lords as Baron Robertson of Port Ellen on 24 August 1999, instantly vacating his seat. The writ for the by-election was moved immediately. The Labour Party selected Bill Tynan, a locally based trade union official, to defend the seat. The Scottish National Party, which was likely to provide the main challenge, chose Annabelle Ewing. Ewing was the daughter of Winnie Ewing; who had famously defeated Labour to win the Hamilton by-election of 1967. The Scottish Socialist Party fought a strong campaign for the seat, and Stephen Mungall was nominated by a local group protesting against the ownership of the local football team, Hamilton Academical F.C.

Twelve candidates stood, which was at the time, the most at any Scottish by-election. This figure was surpassed, when thirteen candidates stood at the 2009 by-election in Glasgow North East.

Polling day for the by-election was on 23 September. The Labour Party narrowly held on to the seat, following a recount; the Liberal Democrats polled poorly, their sixth place was the worst placing at a by-election by any major party since the Conservative candidate in the 1990 Upper Bann by-election also came sixth; for by-elections in seats in Great Britain; it was the lowest since the Liberal candidate in the 1948 Glasgow Camlachie by-election also came sixth. The Scottish Socialist Party outperformed the Conservatives.

== Result ==
Hamilton South by-election, 1999
Party	Candidate	Votes	%	±%
Labour	Bill Tynan	7,172	36.9	–28.7
SNP	Annabelle Ewing	6,616	34.0	+16.4
Scottish Socialist	Shareen Blackall	1,847	9.5	New
Conservative	Charles Ferguson	1,406	7.2	–1.4
Independent	Stephen Mungall	1,075	5.5	New
Liberal Democrats	Marilyne MacLaren	634	3.3	–1.9
ProLife Alliance	Monica Burns	257	1.3	–0.7
Socialist Labour	Tom Dewar	238	1.2	New
Scottish Unionist	Jim Reid	113	0.6	New
UKIP	Alistair McConnachie	61	0.3	New
Natural Law	George Stidolph	18	0.1	New
Independent	John Moray	17	0.1	New
Majority		556	2.9	–45.1
Turnout		19,454	41.3	–29.8
Labour hold		Swing	–22.6	

Mungall used the description "Hamilton Accies Home, Watson Away", referring to demands by some fans that Hamilton Academical should play their home matches locally and that Watson, a prominent shareholder, should go.

== Previous result ==
General Election 1997: Hamilton South
Party	Candidate	Votes	%	±%
Labour	George Robertson	21,709	65.6	
SNP	Ian Black	5,831	17.6	
Conservative	Robert Kilgour	2,858	8.6	
Liberal Democrats	Richard Pitts	1,693	5.1	
ProLife Alliance	Colin Gunn	684	2.1	
Referendum	Stuart Brown	316	1.0	
Majority		15,878	48.0	
Turnout		33,091	71.1	
Labour win (new seat)				

== See also ==
- Hamilton South (UK Parliament constituency)
- Elections in Scotland
- Lists of United Kingdom by-elections
