= Hamilton North and Bellshill (UK Parliament constituency) =

UK Parliament constituency (1997–2005)

- Former burgh constituency for the House of Commons
- Boundary of Hamilton North and Bellshill in Scotland for the 2001 general election

1997–2005
- Seats: One
- Created from: Hamilton
- Replaced by: Airdrie & Shotts; Coatbridge, Chryston & Bellshill; Lanark & Hamilton East; Motherwell & Wishaw

Hamilton North and Bellshill was a burgh constituency represented in the House of Commons of the Parliament of the United Kingdom from 1997 to 2005. It elected one Member of Parliament (MP) by the first-past-the-post system of elections.

== History ==
It was formed by the division of the Hamilton constituency to form Hamilton North and Bellshill and Hamilton South.

Hamilton North and Bellshill was split up in 2005 into parts of Airdrie and Shotts, Coatbridge, Chryston and Bellshill, Lanark and Hamilton East and Motherwell and Wishaw.

== Boundaries ==
The Motherwell District electoral divisions of Bellshill and Tannochside, and North Calder; and the Hamilton District electoral division of Bothwell and Hamilton North.

== Members of Parliament ==
Election	Member	Party
1997	John Reid	Labour
2005	constituency abolished	

== Election results ==
=== Elections of the 2000s ===
General election 2001: Hamilton North and Bellshill
Party	Candidate	Votes	%	±%
Labour	John Reid	18,786	61.8	−2.2
SNP	Chris Stephens	5,225	17.2	−1.9
Conservative	William Frain-Bell	2,649	8.7	−1.7
Liberal Democrats	Keith M. Legg	2,360	7.8	+2.7
Scottish Socialist	Shareen Blackall	1,189	3.9	New
Socialist Labour	Stephen J. Mayes	195	0.6	New
Majority		13,561	44.6	−0.3
Turnout		30,404	56.8	−14.1
Labour hold		Swing		

=== Elections of the 1990s ===
General election 1997: Hamilton North and Bellshill
Party	Candidate	Votes	%	±%
Labour	John Reid	24,322	64.0	
SNP	Michael Matheson	7,255	19.1	
Conservative	Gordon McIntosh	3,944	10.4	
Liberal Democrats	Keith M. Legg	1,719	5.1	
Referendum	Ray P.D. Conn	554	1.5	
Majority		17,067	44.9	
Turnout		37,999	70.9	
Labour win (new seat)				

== See also ==
- Hamilton North and Bellshill (Scottish Parliament constituency)
