= Hamilton South (UK Parliament constituency) =

UK Parliament constituency (1997–2005)

- Former burgh constituency for the House of Commons
- Boundary of Hamilton South in Scotland for the 2001 general election

1997–2005
- Seats: One
- Created from: Hamilton
- Replaced by: Lanark & Hamilton East; Rutherglen & Hamilton West

Hamilton South was a burgh constituency represented in the House of Commons in the Parliament of the United Kingdom. Formed in 1997 from the Hamilton constituency, it was abolished in 2005 and parts of the constituency went to make the constituencies of Lanark and Hamilton East and Rutherglen and Hamilton West.

== Boundaries ==
The Hamilton District electoral divisions of Blantyre and Burnbank, Hamilton South, and Hamilton West.

== Members of Parliament ==
Election	Member	Party	Notes
1997	George Robertson	Labour	resigned 1999 to become Secretary General of NATO
1999 by-election	Bill Tynan	Labour	

== Election results ==
=== Elections of the 2000s ===
General election 2001: Hamilton South
Party	Candidate	Votes	%	±%
Labour	Bill Tynan	15,965	59.7	−5.9
SNP	John Wilson	5,190	19.4	+1.8
Liberal Democrats	John Oswald	2,388	8.9	+3.8
Conservative	Dr. Neil Richardson	1,876	7.0	−1.6
Scottish Socialist	Georgina (Gena) Mitchell	1,187	4.4	N/A
UKIP	Janice Murdoch	151	0.6	N/A
Majority		10,775	40.3	−7.7
Turnout		26,757	57.3	−13.8
Labour hold		Swing		

=== Elections of the 1990s ===
By-election 1999: Hamilton South
Party	Candidate	Votes	%	±%
Labour	Bill Tynan	7,172	36.9	−28.7
SNP	Annabelle Ewing	6,616	34.0	+16.4
Scottish Socialist	Shareen Blackall	1,847	9.5	New
Conservative	Charles Ferguson	1,406	7.2	−1.4
Independent	Stephen A. Mungall	1,075	5.5	New
Liberal Democrats	Marilyne A. MacLaren	634	3.3	−1.8
ProLife Alliance	Monica Burns	257	1.3	−0.8
Socialist Labour	Tom Dewar	238	1.2	New
Scottish Unionist Party (modern)	Jim W. Reid	113	0.6	New
UKIP	Alastair D. McConnachie	61	0.3	New
Natural Law	George W. Stidolph	18	0.1	New
Independent	John S.H. Moray	17	0.1	New
Majority		556	2.9	−45.1
Turnout		19,454	41.3	−29.8
Labour hold		Swing	-22.6	

Mungall used the description "Hamilton Accies Home, Watson Away", referring to demands by some fans that Hamilton Academical should play their home matches locally and that Watson, the chairman, should go. He was a member of the Socialist Labour Party.

General election 1997: Hamilton South
Party	Candidate	Votes	%	±%
Labour	George Robertson	21,709	65.6	
SNP	Ian Black	5,831	17.6	
Conservative	Robert Kilgour	2,858	8.6	
Liberal Democrats	Richard Pitts	1,693	5.1	
ProLife Alliance	Colin S. Gunn	684	2.1	
Referendum	Stuart W. Brown	316	1.0	
Majority		15,878	48.0	
Turnout		33,091	71.1	
Labour win (new seat)				
