= List of MPs elected in the 2001 United Kingdom general election =

2001–2005 Parliament of the United Kingdom
←	1997–2001 Parliament	2005–2010 Parliament	→
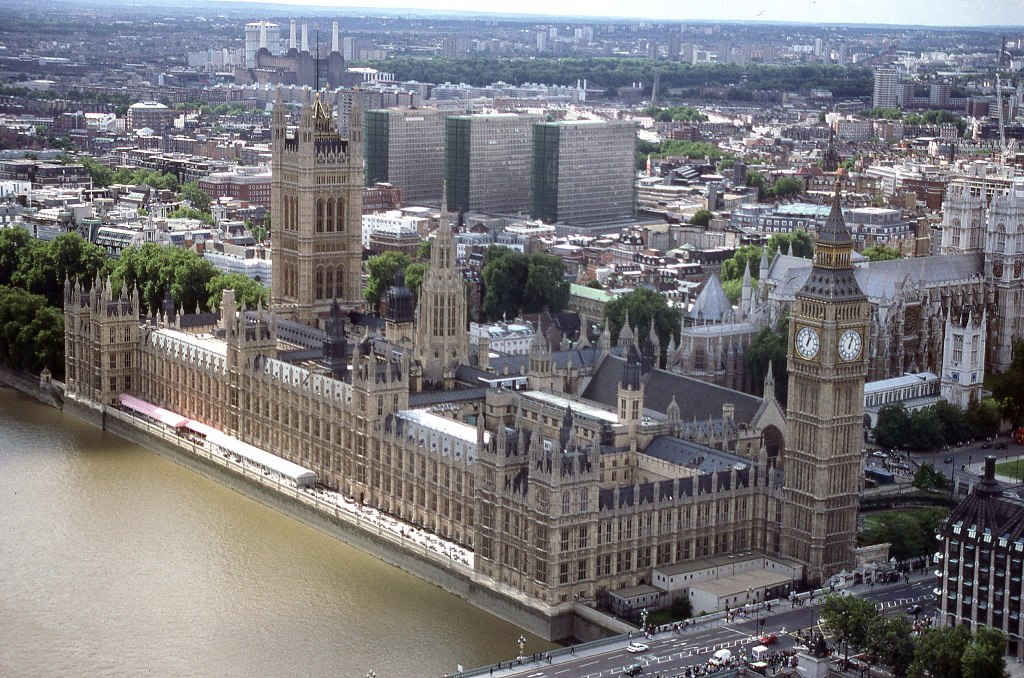
- Palace of Westminster in 2001

Overview
- Legislative body: Parliament of the United Kingdom
- Term: 7 June 2001 – 11 April 2005
- Election: 2001 United Kingdom general election
- Government: Second Blair ministry

House of Commons
- Members: 659
- Speaker: Michael Martin
- Leader: Margaret Beckett; Robin Cook; John Reid; Peter Hain
- Prime Minister: Tony Blair
- Leader of the Opposition: William Hague; Iain Duncan Smith; Michael Howard
- Third-party leader: Charles Kennedy

House of Lords
- Lord Chancellor: Baron Irvine of Lairg; Baron Falconer of Thoroton

Crown-in-Parliament Elizabeth II

Sessions
- 1st: 13 June 2001 – 7 November 2002
- 2nd: 13 November 2002 – 20 November 2003
- 3rd: 26 November 2003 – 18 November 2004
- 4th: 23 November 2004 – 7 April 2005

This is a list of members of Parliament (MPs) elected to the House of Commons at the 2001 general election, held on 7 June. The list is arranged by constituency. New MPs elected since the general election and changes in party allegiance are noted at the bottom of the page.

Notable newcomers to the House of Commons included David Cameron, David Miliband, Boris Johnson, John Thurso, George Osborne, Nigel Dodds, Chris Grayling, Andy Burnham, Adam Price, Alistair Carmichael, Angus Robertson, Chris Bryant, Norman Lamb, and Tom Watson (many of whom would go on to reach senior positions in government and/or their respective parties).

During the 2001–05 Parliament, Michael Martin was the Speaker, Tony Blair served as Prime Minister, and William Hague, Iain Duncan Smith and Michael Howard served as Leader of the Opposition. This Parliament was dissolved on 11 April 2005.

== By nation ==
- List of MPs for constituencies in Northern Ireland (2001–2005)
- List of MPs for constituencies in Scotland (2001–2005)
- List of MPs for constituencies in Wales (2001–2005)

== Composition ==
These representative diagrams show the composition of the parties in the 2001 general election.

Note: The Scottish National Party and Plaid Cymru sat together as a party group, while Sinn Féin did not take its seats. This is not the official seating plan of the House of Commons, which has five rows of benches on each side, with the government party to the right of the speaker and opposition parties to the left, but with room for only around two-thirds of MPs to sit at any one time.

Affiliation	At election	At dissolution
Labour Party	412	404
Conservative Party	166	165
Liberal Democrats	52	51
Ulster Unionist Party	6	4
Scottish National Party	5	3
Democratic Unionist Party	5	6
Plaid Cymru	4	3
Sinn Féin	4	5
Social Democratic and Labour Party	3	2
Independent	1	1
Speaker	1	1
Total	659	659
Notional government majority	167	164
Effective government majority	170	165

The effective government majority was slightly higher because Sinn Féin members did not take up their seats and the speaker does not vote. Speaker Michael Martin technically represented Labour in a notional majority.

Table of contents:

A B C D E F G H I J K L M N O P Q R S T U V W X Y Z Changes

=== A ===
Constituency	Elected MP	Elected party	Previous MP	Previous party
Aberavon	Dr Hywel Francis	Labour	Sir John Morris	Labour
Aberdeen Central	Frank Doran	Labour	Frank Doran	Labour
Aberdeen North	Malcolm Savidge	Labour	Malcolm Savidge	Labour
Aberdeen South	Anne Begg	Labour	Anne Begg	Labour
Airdrie and Shotts	Helen Liddell	Labour	Helen Liddell	Labour
Aldershot	Gerald Howarth	Conservative	Gerald Howarth	Conservative
Aldridge-Brownhills	Richard Shepherd	Conservative	Richard Shepherd	Conservative
Altrincham and Sale West	Graham Brady	Conservative	Graham Brady	Conservative
Alyn and Deeside	Mark Tami	Labour	Barry Jones	Labour
Amber Valley	Judy Mallaber	Labour	Judy Mallaber	Labour
Angus	Michael Weir	Scottish National Party	Andrew Welsh	Scottish National Party
Argyll and Bute	Alan Reid	Liberal Democrat	Ray Michie	Liberal Democrat
Arundel and South Downs	Howard Flight	Conservative	Howard Flight	Conservative
Ashfield	Geoff Hoon	Labour	Geoff Hoon	Labour
Ashford	Damian Green	Conservative	Damian Green	Conservative
Ashton-under-Lyne	David Heyes	Labour	Robert Sheldon	Labour
Aylesbury	David Lidington	Conservative	David Lidington	Conservative
Ayr	Sandra Osborne	Labour	Sandra Osborne	Labour
=== B ===
Constituency	Elected MP	Elected party	Previous MP	Previous party
Banbury	Tony Baldry	Conservative	Tony Baldry	Conservative
Banff and Buchan	Alex Salmond	Scottish National Party	Alex Salmond	Scottish National Party
Barking	Margaret Hodge	Labour	Margaret Hodge	Labour
Barnsley Central	Eric Illsley	Labour	Eric Illsley	Labour
Barnsley East and Mexborough	Jeff Ennis	Labour	Jeff Ennis	Labour
Barnsley West and Penistone	Michael Clapham	Labour	Michael Clapham	Labour
Barrow and Furness	John Hutton	Labour	John Hutton	Labour
Basildon	Angela Smith	Labour Co-operative	Angela Smith	Labour Co-operative
Basingstoke	Andrew Hunter	Conservative	Andrew Hunter	Conservative
Bassetlaw	John Mann	Labour	Joe Ashton	Labour
Bath	Don Foster	Liberal Democrat	Don Foster	Liberal Democrat
Batley and Spen	Mike Wood	Labour	Mike Wood	Labour
Battersea	Martin Linton	Labour	Martin Linton	Labour
Beaconsfield	Dominic Grieve	Conservative	Dominic Grieve	Conservative
Beckenham	Jacqui Lait	Conservative	Jacqui Lait	Conservative
Bedford	Patrick Hall	Labour	Patrick Hall	Labour
Belfast East	Peter Robinson	Democratic Unionist	Peter Robinson	Democratic Unionist
Belfast North	Nigel Dodds	Democratic Unionist	Cecil Walker	Ulster Unionist
Belfast South	The Rev. Martin Smyth	Ulster Unionist	The Rev. Martin Smyth	Ulster Unionist
Belfast West	Gerry Adams	Sinn Féin	Gerry Adams	Sinn Féin
Berwick-upon-Tweed	Alan James Beith	Liberal Democrat	Alan James Beith	Liberal Democrat
Bethnal Green and Bow	Oona King	Labour	Oona King	Labour
Beverley and Holderness	James Cran	Conservative	James Cran	Conservative
Bexhill and Battle	Gregory Barker	Conservative	Charles Wardle	Independent
Bexleyheath and Crayford	Nigel Beard	Labour	Nigel Beard	Labour
Billericay	John Baron	Conservative	Teresa Gorman	Conservative
Birkenhead	Frank Field	Labour	Frank Field	Labour
Birmingham, Edgbaston	Gisela Stuart	Labour	Gisela Stuart	Labour
Birmingham, Erdington	Siôn Simon	Labour	Robin Corbett	Labour
Birmingham, Hall Green	Steve McCabe	Labour	Stephen McCabe	Labour
Birmingham, Hodge Hill	Terry Davis (resigned)	Labour	Terry Davis	Labour
Birmingham, Ladywood	Clare Short	Labour	Clare Short	Labour
Birmingham, Northfield	Richard Burden	Labour	Richard Burden	Labour
Birmingham, Perry Barr	Khalid Mahmood	Labour	Jeff Rooker	Labour
Birmingham, Selly Oak	Dr Lynne Jones	Labour	Dr Lynne Jones	Labour
Birmingham, Sparkbrook and Small Heath	Roger Godsiff	Labour	Roger Godsiff	Labour
Birmingham, Yardley	Estelle Morris	Labour	Estelle Morris	Labour
Bishop Auckland	Derek Foster	Labour	Derek Foster	Labour
Blaby	Andrew Robathan	Conservative	Andrew Robathan	Conservative
Blackburn	Jack Straw	Labour	Jack Straw	Labour
Blackpool North and Fleetwood	Joan Humble	Labour	Joan Humble	Labour
Blackpool South	Gordon Marsden	Labour	Gordon Marsden	Labour
Blaenau Gwent	Llew Smith	Labour	Llew Smith	Labour
Blaydon	John McWilliam	Labour	John McWilliam	Labour
Blyth Valley	Ronnie Campbell	Labour	Ronnie Campbell	Labour
Bognor Regis and Littlehampton	Nick Gibb	Conservative	Nick Gibb	Conservative
Bolsover	Dennis Skinner	Labour	Dennis Skinner	Labour
Bolton North East	David Crausby	Labour	David Crausby	Labour
Bolton South East	Dr Brian Iddon	Labour	Dr Brian Iddon	Labour
Bolton West	Ruth Kelly	Labour	Ruth Kelly	Labour
Bootle	Joe Benton	Labour	Joe Benton	Labour
Boston and Skegness	Mark Simmonds	Conservative	Sir Richard Body	Conservative
Bosworth	David Tredinnick	Conservative	David Tredinnick	Conservative
Bournemouth East	David Atkinson	Conservative	David Atkinson	Conservative
Bournemouth West	Sir John Butterfill	Conservative	Sir John Butterfill	Conservative
Bracknell	Andrew MacKay	Conservative	Andrew MacKay	Conservative
Bradford North	Terry Rooney	Labour	Terry Rooney	Labour
Bradford South	Gerry Sutcliffe	Labour	Gerry Sutcliffe	Labour
Bradford West	Marsha Singh	Labour	Marsha Singh	Labour
Braintree	Alan Hurst	Labour	Alan Hurst	Labour
Brecon and Radnorshire	Roger Williams	Liberal Democrat	Richard Livsey	Liberal Democrat
Brent East	Paul Daisley (deceased)	Labour	Ken Livingstone	Independent
Brent North	Barry Gardiner	Labour	Barry Gardiner	Labour
Brent South	Paul Boateng	Labour	Paul Boateng	Labour
Brentford and Isleworth	Ann Keen	Labour	Ann Keen	Labour
Brentwood and Ongar	Eric Pickles	Conservative	Eric Pickles	Conservative
Bridgend	Win Griffiths	Labour	Win Griffiths	Labour
Bridgwater	Ian Liddell-Grainger	Conservative	Rt Hon Tom King	Conservative
Brigg and Goole	Ian Cawsey	Labour	Ian Cawsey	Labour
Brighton Kemptown	Dr Des Turner	Labour	Dr Des Turner	Labour
Brighton Pavilion	David Lepper	Labour Co-operative	David Lepper	Labour Co-operative
Bristol East	Jean Corston	Labour	Jean Corston	Labour
Bristol North West	Dr Doug Naysmith	Labour Co-operative	Dr Doug Naysmith	Labour Co-operative
Bristol South	Dawn Primarolo	Labour	Dawn Primarolo	Labour
Bristol West	Valerie Davey	Labour	Valerie Davey	Labour
Bromley and Chislehurst	Eric Forth	Conservative	Eric Forth	Conservative
Bromsgrove	Julie Kirkbride	Conservative	Julie Kirkbride	Conservative
Broxbourne	Marion Roe	Conservative	Marion Roe	Conservative
Broxtowe	Dr Nick Palmer	Labour	Dr Nick Palmer	Labour
Buckingham	John Bercow	Conservative	John Bercow	Conservative
Burnley	Peter Pike	Labour	Peter Pike	Labour
Burton	Janet Dean	Labour	Janet Dean	Labour
Bury North	David Chaytor	Labour	David Chaytor	Labour
Bury South	Ivan Lewis	Labour	Ivan Lewis	Labour
Bury St Edmunds	David Ruffley	Conservative	David Ruffley	Conservative
=== C ===
Constituency	Elected MP	Elected party	Previous MP	Previous party
Caernarfon	Hywel Williams	Plaid Cymru	Dafydd Wigley	Plaid Cymru
Caerphilly	Wayne David	Labour	Ron Davies	Labour
Caithness, Sutherland and Easter Ross	John Thurso	Liberal Democrat	Robert Maclennan	Liberal Democrat
Calder Valley	Christine McCafferty	Labour	Christine McCafferty	Labour
Camberwell and Peckham	Harriet Harman	Labour	Harriet Harman	Labour
Cambridge	Anne Campbell	Labour	Anne Campbell	Labour
Cannock Chase	Dr Tony Wright	Labour	Tony Wright	Labour
Canterbury	Julian Brazier	Conservative	Julian Brazier	Conservative
Cardiff Central	Jon Owen Jones	Labour Co-operative	Jon Owen Jones	Labour Co-operative
Cardiff North	Julie Morgan	Labour	Julie Morgan	Labour
Cardiff South and Penarth	Alun Michael	Labour Co-operative	Alun Michael	Labour Co-operative
Cardiff West	Kevin Brennan	Labour	Rhodri Morgan	Labour
Carlisle	Eric Martlew	Labour	Eric Martlew	Labour
Carmarthen East and Dinefwr	Adam Price	Plaid Cymru	Alan Williams	Labour
Carmarthen West and South Pembrokeshire	Nick Ainger	Labour	Nick Ainger	Labour
Carrick, Cumnock and Doon Valley	George Foulkes	Labour Co-operative	George Foulkes	Labour Co-operative
Carshalton and Wallington	Tom Brake	Liberal Democrat	Tom Brake	Liberal Democrat
Castle Point	Bob Spink	Conservative	Christine Butler	Labour
Central Fife	John MacDougall	Labour	Henry McLeish	Labour
Central Suffolk and North Ipswich	Sir Michael Lord	Conservative	Michael Lord	Conservative
Ceredigion	Simon Thomas	Plaid Cymru	Simon Thomas	Plaid Cymru
Charnwood	Stephen Dorrell	Conservative	Stephen Dorrell	Conservative
Chatham and Aylesford	Jonathan Shaw	Labour	Jonathan Shaw	Labour
Cheadle	Patsy Calton	Liberal Democrat	Stephen Day	Conservative
Cheltenham	Nigel Jones	Liberal Democrat	Nigel Jones	Liberal Democrat
Chesham and Amersham	Cheryl Gillan	Conservative	Cheryl Gillan	Conservative
City of Chester	Christine Russell	Labour	Christine Russell	Labour
Chesterfield	Paul Holmes	Liberal Democrat	Tony Benn	Labour
Chichester	Andrew Tyrie	Conservative	Andrew Tyrie	Conservative
Chingford and Woodford Green	Iain Duncan Smith	Conservative	Iain Duncan Smith	Conservative
Chipping Barnet	Sir Sydney Chapman	Conservative	Sydney Chapman	Conservative
Chorley	Lindsay Hoyle	Labour	Lindsay Hoyle	Labour
Christchurch	Christopher Chope	Conservative	Christopher Chope	Conservative
Cities of London and Westminster	Mark Field	Conservative	Peter Brooke	Conservative
Cleethorpes	Shona McIsaac	Labour	Shona McIsaac	Labour
Clwyd South	Martyn Jones	Labour	Martyn Jones	Labour
Clwyd West	Gareth Thomas	Labour	Gareth Thomas	Labour
Clydebank and Milngavie	Tony Worthington	Labour	Tony Worthington	Labour
Clydesdale	Jimmy Hood	Labour	Jimmy Hood	Labour
Coatbridge and Chryston	Tom Clarke	Labour	Tom Clarke	Labour
Colchester	Bob Russell	Liberal Democrat	Bob Russell	Liberal Democrat
Colne Valley	Kali Mountford	Labour	Kali Mountford	Labour
Congleton	Ann Winterton	Conservative	Ann Winterton	Conservative
Conwy	Betty Williams	Labour	Betty Williams	Labour
Copeland	Jack Cunningham	Labour	Jack Cunningham	Labour
Corby	Phil Hope	Labour Co-operative	Phil Hope	Labour Co-operative
Cotswold	Geoffrey Clifton-Brown	Conservative	Geoffrey-Clifton Brown	Conservative
Coventry North East	Bob Ainsworth	Labour	Bob Ainsworth	Labour
Coventry North West	Geoffrey Robinson	Labour	Geoffrey Robinson	Labour
Coventry South	Jim Cunningham	Labour	Jim Cunningham	Labour
Crawley	Laura Moffatt	Labour	Laura Moffatt	Labour
Crewe and Nantwich	Gwyneth Dunwoody	Labour	Gwyneth Dunwoody	Labour
Crosby	Claire Curtis-Thomas	Labour	Claire Curtis-Thomas	Labour
Croydon Central	Geraint Davies	Labour	Geraint Davies	Labour
Croydon North	Malcolm Wicks	Labour	Malcolm Wicks	Labour
Croydon South	Richard Ottaway	Conservative	Richard Ottaway	Conservative
Cumbernauld and Kilsyth	Rosemary McKenna	Labour	Rosemary McKenna	Labour
Cunninghame North	Brian Wilson	Labour	Brian Wilson	Labour
Cunninghame South	Brian Donohoe	Labour	Brian Donohoe	Labour
Cynon Valley	Ann Clwyd	Labour	Ann Clwyd	Labour
=== D ===
Constituency	Elected MP	Elected party	Previous MP	Previous party
Dagenham	Jon Cruddas	Labour	Judith Church	Labour
Darlington	Alan Milburn	Labour	Alan Milburn	Labour
Dartford	Dr Howard Stoate	Labour	Dr Howard Stoate	Labour
Daventry	Tim Boswell	Conservative	Tim Boswell	Conservative
Delyn	David Hanson	Labour	David Hanson	Labour
Denton and Reddish	Andrew Bennett	Labour	Andrew Bennett	Labour
Derby North	Bob Laxton	Labour	Bob Laxton	Labour
Derby South	Margaret Beckett	Labour	Margaret Beckett	Labour
Devizes	Michael Ancram	Conservative	Michael Ancram	Conservative
Dewsbury	Ann Taylor	Labour	Ann Taylor	Labour
Don Valley	Caroline Flint	Labour	Caroline Flint	Labour
Doncaster Central	Rosie Winterton	Labour	Rosie Winterton	Labour
Doncaster North	Kevin Hughes	Labour	Kevin Hughes	Labour
Dover	Gwyn Prosser	Labour	Gwyn Prosser	Labour
Dudley North	Ross Cranston	Labour	Ross Cranston	Labour
Dudley South	Ian Pearson	Labour	Ian Pearson	Labour
Dulwich and West Norwood	Tessa Jowell	Labour	Tessa Jowell	Labour
Dumbarton	John McFall	Labour Co-operative	John McFall	Labour Co-operative
Dumfries	Russell Brown	Labour	Russell Brown	Labour
Dundee East	Iain Luke	Labour	John McAllion	Labour
Dundee West	Ernie Ross	Labour	Ernie Ross	Labour
Dunfermline East	Gordon Brown	Labour	Gordon Brown	Labour
Dunfermline West	Rachel Squire	Labour	Rachel Squire	Labour
City of Durham	Gerry Steinberg	Labour	Gerry Steinberg	Labour
=== E ===
Constituency	Elected MP	Elected party	Previous MP	Previous party
Ealing North	Stephen Pound	Labour	Stephen Pound	Labour
Ealing Acton and Shepherd's Bush	Clive Soley	Labour	Clive Soley	Labour
Ealing Southall	Piara Khabra	Labour	Piara Khabra	Labour
Easington	John Cummings	Labour	John Cummings	Labour
East Antrim	Roy Beggs	Ulster Unionist	Roy Beggs	Ulster Unionist
East Devon	Hugo Swire	Conservative	Peter Emery	Conservative
East Ham	Stephen Timms	Labour	Stephen Timms	Labour
East Hampshire	Michael Mates	Conservative	Michael Mates	Conservative
East Kilbride	Adam Ingram	Labour	Adam Ingram	Labour
East Londonderry	Gregory Campbell	Democratic Unionist	William Ross	Ulster Unionist
East Lothian	Anne Picking	Labour	John Home Robertson	Labour
East Surrey	Peter Ainsworth	Conservative	Peter Ainsworth	Conservative
East Worthing and Shoreham	Tim Loughton	Conservative	Tim Loughton	Conservative
East Yorkshire	Greg Knight	Conservative	John Townend	Conservative
Eastbourne	Nigel Waterson	Conservative	Nigel Waterson	Conservative
Eastleigh	David Chidgey	Liberal Democrat	David Chidgey	Liberal Democrat
Eastwood	Jim Murphy	Labour	Jim Murphy	Labour
Eccles	Ian Stewart	Labour	Ian Stewart	Labour
Eddisbury	Stephen O'Brien	Conservative	Stephen O'Brien	Conservative
Edinburgh Central	Alistair Darling	Labour	Alistair Darling	Labour
Edinburgh East and Musselburgh	Gavin Strang	Labour	Gavin Strang	Labour
Edinburgh North and Leith	Mark Lazarowicz	Labour Co-operative	Malcolm Chisholm	Labour
Edinburgh South	Nigel Griffiths	Labour	Nigel Griffiths	Labour
Edinburgh West	John Barrett	Liberal Democrat	Donald Gorrie	Liberal Democrat
Edinburgh Pentlands	Dr Lynda Clark	Labour	Dr Lynda Clark	Labour
Edmonton	Andy Love	Labour Co-operative	Andy Love	Labour Co-operative
Ellesmere Port and Neston	Andrew Miller	Labour	Andrew Miller	Labour
Elmet	Colin Burgon	Labour	Colin Burgon	Labour
Eltham	Clive Efford	Labour	Clive Efford	Labour
Enfield North	Joan Ryan	Labour	Joan Ryan	Labour
Enfield Southgate	Stephen Twigg	Labour	Stephen Twigg	Labour
Epping Forest	Eleanor Laing	Conservative	Eleanor Laing	Conservative
Epsom and Ewell	Chris Grayling	Conservative	Archie Hamilton	Conservative
Erewash	Liz Blackman	Labour	Liz Blackman	Labour
Erith and Thamesmead	John Austin	Labour	John Austin	Labour
Esher and Walton	Ian Taylor	Conservative	Ian Taylor	Conservative
Exeter	Ben Bradshaw	Labour	Ben Bradshaw	Labour
=== F ===
Constituency	Elected MP	Elected party	Previous MP	Previous party
Falkirk East	Michael Connarty	Labour	Michael Connarty	Labour
Falkirk West	Eric Joyce	Labour	Eric Joyce	Labour
Falmouth and Camborne	Candy Atherton	Labour	Candy Atherton	Labour
Fareham	Mark Hoban	Conservative	Mark Hoban	Conservative
Faversham and Mid Kent	Hugh Robertson	Conservative	Andrew Rowe	Conservative
Feltham and Heston	Alan Keen	Labour Co-operative	Alan Keen	Labour Co-operative
Fermanagh and South Tyrone	Michelle Gildernew	Sinn Féin	Ken Maginnis	Ulster Unionist
Finchley and Golders Green	Dr Rudi Vis	Labour	Dr Rudi Vis	Labour
Folkestone and Hythe	Michael Howard	Conservative	Michael Howard	Conservative
Forest of Dean	Diana Organ	Labour	Diana Organ	Labour
Foyle	John Hume	Social Democratic and Labour	John Hume	Social Democratic and Labour
Fylde	Michael Jack	Conservative	Michael Jack	Conservative
=== G ===
Constituency	Elected MP	Elected party	Previous MP	Previous party
Gainsborough	Edward Leigh	Conservative	Edward Leigh	Conservative
Galloway and Upper Nithsdale	Peter Duncan	Conservative	Alasdair Morgan	Scottish National
Gateshead East and Washington West	Joyce Quin	Labour	Joyce Quin	Labour
Gedling	Vernon Coaker	Labour	Vernon Coaker	Labour
Gillingham	Paul Clark	Labour	Paul Clark	Labour
Glasgow, Anniesland	John Robertson	Labour	John Robertson	Labour
Glasgow Baillieston	Jimmy Wray	Labour	Jimmy Wray	Labour
Glasgow Cathcart	Tom Harris	Labour	John Maxton	Labour
Glasgow Govan	Mohammad Sarwar	Labour	Mohammad Sarwar	Labour
Glasgow Kelvin	George Galloway	Labour	George Galloway	Labour
Glasgow Maryhill	Ann McKechin	Labour	Maria Fyfe	Labour
Glasgow Pollok	Ian Davidson	Labour Co-operative	Ian Davidson	Labour Co-operative
Glasgow Rutherglen	Thomas McAvoy	Labour Co-operative	Thomas McAvoy	Labour Co-operative
Glasgow Shettleston	David Marshall	Labour	David Marshall	Labour
Glasgow, Springburn	Michael Martin	None - Speaker	Michael Martin	None - Speaker
Gloucester	Parmjit Dhanda	Labour	Tess Kingham	Labour
Gordon	Malcolm Bruce	Liberal Democrat	Malcolm Bruce	Liberal Democrat
Gosport	Peter Viggers	Conservative	Peter Viggers	Conservative
Gower	Martin Caton	Labour	Martin Caton	Labour
Grantham and Stamford	Quentin Davies	Conservative	Quentin Davies	Conservative
Gravesham	Chris Pond	Labour	Chris Pond	Labour
Great Grimsby	Austin Mitchell	Labour	Austin Mitchell	Labour
Great Yarmouth	Tony Wright	Labour	Tony Wright	Labour
Greenock and Inverclyde	David Cairns	Labour	Norman Godman	Labour
Greenwich and Woolwich	Nick Raynsford	Labour	Nick Raynsford	Labour
Guildford	Sue Doughty	Liberal Democrat	Nick St Aubyn	Conservative
=== H ===
Constituency	Elected MP	Elected party	Previous MP	Previous party
Hackney North and Stoke Newington	Diane Abbott	Labour	Diane Abbott	Labour
Hackney South and Shoreditch	Brian Sedgemore	Labour	Brian Sedgemore	Labour
Halesowen and Rowley Regis	Sylvia Heal	Labour	Sylvia Heal	Labour
Halifax	Alice Mahon	Labour	Alice Mahon	Labour
Haltemprice and Howden	David Davis	Conservative	David Davis	Conservative
Halton	Derek Twigg	Labour	Derek Twigg	Labour
Hamilton North and Bellshill	John Reid	Labour	John Reid	Labour
Hamilton South	Bill Tynan	Labour	Bill Tynan	Labour
Hammersmith and Fulham	Iain Coleman	Labour	Iain Coleman	Labour
Hampstead and Highgate	Glenda Jackson	Labour	Glenda Jackson	Labour
Harborough	Edward Garnier	Conservative	Edward Garnier	Conservative
Harlow	Bill Rammell	Labour	Bill Rammell	Labour
Harrogate and Knaresborough	Phil Willis	Liberal Democrat	Phil Willis	Liberal Democrat
Harrow East	Tony McNulty	Labour	Tony McNulty	Labour
Harrow West	Gareth Thomas	Labour	Gareth Thomas	Labour
Hartlepool	Peter Mandelson (resigned)	Labour	Peter Mandelson	Labour
Harwich	Ivan Henderson	Labour	Ivan Henderson	Labour
Hastings and Rye	Michael Foster	Labour	Michael Foster	Labour
Havant	David Willetts	Conservative	David Willetts	Conservative
Hayes and Harlington	John McDonnell	Labour	John McDonnell	Labour
Hazel Grove	Andrew Stunell	Liberal Democrat	Andrew Stunell	Liberal Democrat
Hemel Hempstead	Tony McWalter	Labour Co-operative	Tony McWalter	Labour Co-operative
Hemsworth	Jon Trickett	Labour	Jon Trickett	Labour
Hendon	Andrew Dismore	Labour	Andrew Dismore	Labour
Henley	Boris Johnson	Conservative	Michael Heseltine	Conservative
Hereford	Paul Keetch	Liberal Democrat	Paul Keetch	Liberal Democrat
Hertford and Stortford	Mark Prisk	Conservative	Bowen Wells	Conservative
Hertsmere	James Clappison	Conservative	James Clappison	Conservative
Hexham	Peter Atkinson	Conservative	Peter Atkinson	Conservative
Heywood and Middleton	Jim Dobbin	Labour Co-operative	Jim Dobbin	Labour Co-Operative
High Peak	Tom Levitt	Labour	Tom Levitt	Labour
Hitchin and Harpenden	Peter Lilley	Conservative	Peter Lilley	Conservative
Holborn and St Pancras	Frank Dobson	Labour	Frank Dobson	Labour
Hornchurch	John Cryer	Labour	John Cryer	Labour
Hornsey and Wood Green	Barbara Roche	Labour	Barbara Roche	Labour
Horsham	Francis Maude	Conservative	Francis Maude	Conservative
Houghton and Washington East	Fraser Kemp	Labour	Fraser Kemp	Labour
Hove	Ivor Caplin	Labour	Ivor Caplin	Labour
Huddersfield	Barry Sheerman	Labour Co-operative	Barry Sheerman	Labour Co-operative
Huntingdon	Jonathan Djanogly	Conservative	Rt Hon John Major	Conservative
Hyndburn	Greg Pope	Labour	Greg Pope	Labour
=== I ===
Constituency	Elected MP	Elected party	Previous MP	Previous party
Ilford North	Linda Perham	Labour	Linda Perham	Labour
Ilford South	Mike Gapes	Labour Co-operative	Mike Gapes	Labour Co-operative
Inverness East, Nairn and Lochaber	David Stewart	Labour	David Stewart	Labour
Ipswich	Jamie Cann (deceased)	Labour	Jamie Cann	Labour
Isle of Wight	Andrew Turner	Conservative	Peter Brand	Liberal Democrat
Islington North	Jeremy Corbyn	Labour	Jeremy Corbyn	Labour
Islington South and Finsbury	Chris Smith	Labour	Chris Smith	Labour
Islwyn	Don Touhig	Labour Co-operative	Don Touhig	Labour Co-operative
=== J ===
Constituency	Elected MP	Elected party	Previous MP	Previous party
Jarrow	Stephen Hepburn	Labour	Stephen Hepburn	Labour
=== K ===
Constituency	Elected MP	Elected party	Previous MP	Previous party
Keighley	Ann Cryer	Labour	Ann Cryer	Labour
Kensington and Chelsea	Michael Portillo	Conservative	Michael Portillo	Conservative
Kettering	Phil Sawford	Labour	Phil Sawford	Labour
Kilmarnock and Loudoun	Des Browne	Labour	Des Browne	Labour
Kingston and Surbiton	Edward Davey	Liberal Democrat	Ed Davey	Liberal Democrat
Kingston upon Hull East	John Prescott	Labour	Rt Hon John Prescott	Labour
Kingston upon Hull North	Kevin McNamara	Labour	Kevin McNamara	Labour
Kingston upon Hull West and Hessle	Alan Johnson	Labour	Alan Johnson	Labour
Kingswood	Roger Berry	Labour	Roger Berry	Labour
Kirkcaldy	Dr Lewis Moonie	Labour Co-operative	Lewis Moonie	Labour Co-operative
Knowsley North and Sefton East	George Howarth	Labour	George Howarth	Labour
Knowsley South	Edward O'Hara	Labour	Eddie O'Hara	Labour
=== L ===
Constituency	Elected MP	Elected party	Previous MP	Previous party
Lagan Valley	Jeffrey Donaldson	Ulster Unionist	Jeffrey Donaldson	Ulster Unionist
Lancaster and Wyre	Hilton Dawson	Labour	Hilton Dawson	Labour
Leeds Central	Hilary Benn	Labour	Hilary Benn	Labour
Leeds East	George Mudie	Labour	George Mudie	Labour
Leeds North East	Fabian Hamilton	Labour	Fabian Hamilton	Labour
Leeds North West	Harold Best	Labour	Harold Best	Labour
Leeds West	John Battle	Labour	John Battle	Labour
Leicester East	Keith Vaz	Labour	Keith Vaz	Labour
Leicester South	Jim Marshall (deceased)	Labour	Jim Marshall	Labour
Leicester West	Patricia Hewitt	Labour	Patricia Hewitt	Labour
Leigh	Andy Burnham	Labour	Lawrence Cunliffe	Labour
Leominster	Bill Wiggin	Conservative	Peter Temple-Morris	Labour
Lewes	Norman Baker	Liberal Democrat	Norman Baker	Liberal Democrat
Lewisham East	Bridget Prentice	Labour	Bridget Prentice	Labour
Lewisham West	Jim Dowd	Labour	Jim Dowd	Labour
Lewisham Deptford	Joan Ruddock	Labour	Joan Ruddock	Labour
Leyton and Wanstead	Harry Cohen	Labour	Harry Cohen	Labour
Lichfield	Michael Fabricant	Conservative	Michael Fabricant	Conservative
Lincoln	Gillian Merron	Labour	Gillian Merron	Labour
Linlithgow	Sir Tam Dalyell	Labour	Tam Dalyell	Labour
Liverpool, Garston	Maria Eagle	Labour	Maria Eagle	Labour
Liverpool, Riverside	Louise Ellman	Labour Co-operative	Louise Ellman	Labour Co-operative
Liverpool, Walton	Peter Kilfoyle	Labour	Peter Kilfoyle	Labour
Liverpool, Wavertree	Jane Kennedy	Labour	Jane Kennedy	Labour
Liverpool, West Derby	Bob Wareing	Labour	Bob Wareing	Labour
Livingston	Robin Cook	Labour	Robin Cook	Labour
Llanelli	Denzil Davies	Labour	Denzil Davies	Labour
Loughborough	Andy Reed	Labour Co-operative	Andy Reed	Labour Co-operative
Louth and Horncastle	Sir Peter Tapsell	Conservative	Sir Peter Tapsell	Conservative
Ludlow	Matthew Green	Liberal Democrat	Christopher Gill	Conservative
Luton North	Kelvin Hopkins	Labour	Kelvin Hopkins	Labour
Luton South	Margaret Moran	Labour	Margaret Moran	Labour
=== M ===
Constituency	Elected MP	Elected party	Previous MP	Previous party
Macclesfield	Sir Nicholas Winterton	Conservative	Sir Nicholas Winterton	Conservative
Maidenhead	Theresa May	Conservative	Theresa May	Conservative
Maidstone and The Weald	Ann Widdecombe	Conservative	Ann Widdecombe	Conservative
Makerfield	Ian McCartney	Labour	Ian McCartney	Labour
Maldon and East Chelmsford	John Whittingdale	Conservative	John Whittingdale	Conservative
Manchester Central	Tony Lloyd	Labour	Tony Lloyd	Labour
Manchester, Blackley	Graham Stringer	Labour	Graham Stringer	Labour
Manchester, Gorton	Gerald Kaufman	Labour	Gerald Kaufman	Labour
Manchester, Withington	Keith Bradley	Labour	Keith Bradley	Labour
Mansfield	Alan Meale	Labour	Alan Meale	Labour
Medway	Robert Marshall-Andrews	Labour	Robert Marshall-Andrews	Labour
Meirionnydd Nant Conwy	Elfyn Llwyd	Plaid Cymru	Elfyn Llwyd	Plaid Cymru
Meriden	Caroline Spelman	Conservative	Caroline Spelman	Conservative
Merthyr Tydfil and Rhymney	Dai Havard	Labour	Ted Rowlands	Labour
Mid Bedfordshire	Jonathan Sayeed	Conservative	Jonathan Sayeed	Conservative
Mid Dorset and North Poole	Annette Brooke	Liberal Democrat	Christopher Fraser	Conservative
Mid Norfolk	Keith Simpson	Conservative	Keith Simpson	Conservative
Mid Sussex	Nicholas Soames	Conservative	Nicholas Soames	Conservative
Mid Ulster	Martin McGuinness	Sinn Féin	Martin McGuinness	Sinn Féin
Mid Worcestershire	Peter Luff	Conservative	Peter Luff	Conservative
Middlesbrough	Sir Stuart Bell	Labour	Sir Stuart Bell	Labour
Middlesbrough South and East Cleveland	Dr Ashok Kumar	Labour	Dr Ashok Kumar	Labour
Midlothian	David Hamilton	Labour	Eric Clarke	Labour
Milton Keynes South West	Dr Phyllis Starkey	Labour	Dr Phyllis Starkey	Labour
Mitcham and Morden	Siobhain McDonagh	Labour	Siobhain McDonagh	Labour
Mole Valley	Sir Paul Beresford	Conservative	Sir Paul Beresford	Conservative
Monmouth	Huw Edwards	Labour	Huw Edwards	Labour
Montgomeryshire	Lembit Öpik	Liberal Democrat	Lembit Öpik	Liberal Democrat
Moray	Angus Robertson	Scottish National Party	Margaret Ewing	Scottish National Party
Morecambe and Lunesdale	Geraldine Smith	Labour	Geraldine Smith	Labour
Morley and Rothwell	Colin Challen	Labour	John Gunnell	Labour
Motherwell and Wishaw	Frank Roy	Labour	Frank Roy	Labour
=== N ===
Constituency	Elected MP	Elected party	Previous MP	Previous party
Neath	Peter Hain	Labour	Peter Hain	Labour
New Forest East	Dr Julian Lewis	Conservative	Dr Julian Lewis	Conservative
New Forest West	Desmond Swayne	Conservative	Desmond Swayne	Conservative
Newark	Patrick Mercer	Conservative	Fiona Jones	Labour
Newbury	David Rendel	Liberal Democrat	David Rendel	Liberal Democrat
Newcastle upon Tyne Central	Jim Cousins	Labour	Jim Cousins	Labour
Newcastle upon Tyne East and Wallsend	Nick Brown	Labour	Nick Brown	Labour
Newcastle upon Tyne North	Doug Henderson	Labour	Doug Henderson	Labour
Newcastle-under-Lyme	Paul Farrelly	Labour	Llin Golding	Labour
Newport East	Alan Howarth	Labour	Alan Howarth	Labour
Newport West	Paul Flynn	Labour	Paul Flynn	Labour
Newry and Armagh	Seamus Mallon	Social Democratic and Labour	Seamus Mallon	Social Democratic and Labour
Normanton	Bill O'Brien	Labour	Bill O'Brien	Labour
North Antrim	The Rev. Ian Paisley	Democratic Unionist	The Rev. Ian Paisley	Democratic Unionist
North Cornwall	Paul Tyler	Liberal Democrat	Paul Tyler	Liberal Democrat
North Devon	Nick Harvey	Liberal Democrat	Nick Harvey	Liberal Democrat
North Dorset	Robert Walter	Conservative	Robert Walter	Conservative
North Down	Sylvia Hermon	Ulster Unionist	Robert McCartney	UK Unionist
North Durham	Kevan Jones	Labour	Giles Radice	Labour
North East Bedfordshire	Alistair Burt	Conservative	Sir Nicholas Lyell	Conservative
North East Cambridgeshire	Malcolm Moss	Conservative	Malcolm Moss	Conservative
North East Derbyshire	Harry Barnes	Labour	Harry Barnes	Labour
North East Fife	Sir Menzies Campbell	Liberal Democrat	Sir Menzies Campbell	Liberal Democrat
North East Hampshire	James Arbuthnot	Conservative	James Arbuthnot	Conservative
North East Hertfordshire	Oliver Heald	Conservative	Oliver Heald	Conservative
North East Milton Keynes	Brian White	Labour	Brian White	Labour
North Essex	Bernard Jenkin	Conservative	Bernard Jenkin	Conservative
North Norfolk	Norman Lamb	Liberal Democrat	David Prior	Conservative
North Shropshire	Owen Paterson	Conservative	Owen Paterson	Conservative
North Southwark and Bermondsey	Simon Hughes	Liberal Democrat	Simon Hughes	Liberal Democrat
North Swindon	Michael Wills	Labour	Michael Wills	Labour
North Tayside	Peter Wishart	Scottish National Party	John Swinney	Scottish National Party
North Thanet	Roger Gale	Conservative	Roger Gale	Conservative
North Tyneside	Stephen Byers	Labour	Stephen Byers	Labour
North Warwickshire	Mike O'Brien	Labour	Mike O'Brien	Labour
North West Cambridgeshire	Sir Brian Mawhinney	Conservative	Sir Brian Mawhinney	Conservative
North West Durham	Hilary Armstrong	Labour	Hilary Armstrong	Labour
North West Hampshire	Sir George Young, 6th Baronet	Conservative	Sir George Young, 6th Baronet	Conservative
North West Leicestershire	David Taylor	Labour Co-operative	David Taylor	Labour Co-operative
North West Norfolk	Henry Bellingham	Conservative	George Turner	Labour
North Wiltshire	James Gray	Conservative	James Gray	Conservative
Northampton North	Sally Keeble	Labour	Sally Keeble	Labour
Northampton South	Tony Clarke	Labour	Tony Clarke	Labour
Northavon	Steve Webb	Liberal Democrat	Steve Webb	Liberal Democrat
Norwich North	Dr Ian Gibson	Labour	Dr Ian Gibson	Labour
Norwich South	Charles Clarke	Labour	Charles Clarke	Labour
Nottingham East	John Heppell	Labour	John Heppell	Labour
Nottingham North	Graham Allen	Labour	Graham Allen	Labour
Nottingham South	Alan Simpson	Labour	Alan Simpson	Labour
Nuneaton	Bill Olner	Labour	Bill Olner	Labour
=== O ===
Constituency	Elected MP	Elected party	Previous MP	Previous party
Ochil	Martin O'Neill	Labour	Martin O'Neill	Labour
Ogmore	Sir Ray Powell	Labour	Sir Ray Powell	Labour
Old Bexley and Sidcup	Derek Conway	Conservative	Sir Edward Heath	Conservative
Oldham East and Saddleworth	Phil Woolas	Labour	Phil Woolas	Labour
Oldham West and Royton	Michael Meacher	Labour	Michael Meacher	Labour
Orkney and Shetland	Alistair Carmichael	Liberal Democrat	Jim Wallace	Liberal Democrat
Orpington	John Horam	Conservative	John Horam	Conservative
Oxford East	Andrew Smith	Labour	Andrew Smith	Labour
Oxford West and Abingdon	Dr Evan Harris	Liberal Democrat	Dr Evan Harris	Liberal Democrat
=== P ===
Constituency	Elected MP	Elected party	Previous MP	Previous party
Paisley North	Irene Adams	Labour	Irene Adams	Labour
Paisley South	Douglas Alexander	Labour	Douglas Alexander	Labour
Pendle	Gordon Prentice	Labour	Gordon Prentice	Labour
Penrith and The Border	David Maclean	Conservative	David Maclean	Conservative
Perth	Annabelle Ewing	Scottish National Party	Roseanna Cunningham	Scottish National Party
Peterborough	Helen Clark	Labour	Helen Clark	Labour
Plymouth, Devonport	David Jamieson	Labour	David Jamieson	Labour
Plymouth, Sutton	Linda Gilroy	Labour Co-operative	Linda Gilroy	Labour Co-operative
Pontefract and Castleford	Yvette Cooper	Labour	Yvette Cooper	Labour
Pontypridd	Dr Kim Howells	Labour	Dr Kim Howells	Labour
Poole	Robert Syms	Conservative	Robert Syms	Conservative
Poplar and Canning Town	Jim Fitzpatrick	Labour	Jim Fitzpatrick	Labour
Portsmouth North	Syd Rapson	Labour	Syd Rapson	Labour
Portsmouth South	Mike Hancock	Liberal Democrat	Mike Hancock	Liberal Democrat
Preseli Pembrokeshire	Jackie Lawrence	Labour	Jackie Lawrence	Labour
Preston	Mark Hendrick	Labour Co-operative	Mark Hendrick	Labour
Pudsey	Paul Truswell	Labour	Paul Truswell	Labour
Putney	Tony Colman	Labour	Tony Colman	Labour
=== R ===
Constituency	Elected MP	Elected party	Previous MP	Previous party
Rayleigh	Mark Francois	Conservative	Dr Michael Clark	Conservative
Reading East	Jane Griffiths	Labour	Jane Griffiths	Labour
Reading West	Martin Salter	Labour	Martin Salter	Labour
Redcar	Vera Baird	Labour	Dr Mo Mowlam	Labour
Redditch	Jacqui Smith	Labour	Jacqui Smith	Labour
Regent's Park and Kensington North	Karen Buck	Labour	Karen Buck	Labour
Reigate	Crispin Blunt	Conservative	Crispin Blunt	Conservative
Rhondda	Chris Bryant	Labour	Allan Rogers	Labour
Ribble Valley	Nigel Evans	Conservative	Nigel Evans	Conservative
Richmond (Yorks)	William Hague	Conservative	William Hague	Conservative
Richmond Park	Dr Jenny Tonge	Liberal Democrat	Dr Jenny Tonge	Liberal Democrat
Rochdale	Lorna Fitzsimons	Labour	Lorna Fitzsimmons	Labour
Rochford and Southend East	Sir Teddy Taylor	Conservative	Sir Teddy Taylor	Conservative
Romford	Andrew Rosindell	Conservative	Eileen Gordon	Labour
Romsey	Sandra Gidley	Liberal Democrat	Sandra Gidley	Liberal Democrat
Ross, Skye and Inverness West	Charles Kennedy	Liberal Democrat	Charles Kennedy	Liberal Democrat
Rossendale and Darwen	Janet Anderson	Labour	Janet Anderson	Labour
Rother Valley	Kevin Barron	Labour	Kevin Barron	Labour
Rotherham	Dr Denis MacShane	Labour	Dr Denis MacShane	Labour
Roxburgh and Berwickshire	Sir Archy Kirkwood	Liberal Democrat	Sir Archy Kirkwood	Liberal Democrat
Rugby and Kenilworth	Andy King	Labour	Andy King	Labour
Ruislip-Northwood	John Wilkinson	Conservative	John Wilkinson	Conservative
Runnymede and Weybridge	Philip Hammond	Conservative	Philip Hammond	Conservative
Rushcliffe	Kenneth Clarke	Conservative	Kenneth Clarke	Conservative
Rutland and Melton	Alan Duncan	Conservative	Alan Duncan	Conservative
Ryedale	John Greenway	Conservative	John Greenway	Conservative
=== S ===
Constituency	Elected MP	Elected party	Previous MP	Previous party
Saffron Walden	Sir Alan Haselhurst	Conservative	Sir Alan Haselhurst	Conservative
St Albans	Kerry Pollard	Labour	Kerry Pollard	Labour
St Helens North	David Watts	Labour	David Watts	Labour
St Helens South	Shaun Woodward	Labour	Gerry Bermingham	Labour
St Ives	Andrew George	Liberal Democrat	Andrew George	Liberal Democrat
Salford	Hazel Blears	Labour	Hazel Blears	Labour
Salisbury	Robert Key	Conservative	Robert Key	Conservative
Scarborough and Whitby	Lawrie Quinn	Labour	Lawrie Quinn	Labour
Scunthorpe	Elliot Morley	Labour	Elliot Morley	Labour
Sedgefield	Tony Blair	Labour	Tony Blair	Labour
Selby	John Grogan	Labour	John Grogan	Labour
Sevenoaks	Michael Fallon	Conservative	Michael Fallon	Conservative
Sheffield Central	Richard Caborn	Labour	Richard Caborn	Labour
Sheffield Attercliffe	Clive Betts	Labour	Clive Betts	Labour
Sheffield Brightside	David Blunkett	Labour	David Blunkett	Labour
Sheffield Hallam	Richard Allan	Liberal Democrat	Richard Allan	Liberal Democrat
Sheffield Heeley	Meg Munn	Labour Co-operative	Bill Michie	Labour
Sheffield Hillsborough	Helen Jackson	Labour	Helen Jackson	Labour
Sherwood	Paddy Tipping	Labour	Paddy Tipping	Labour
Shipley	Chris Leslie	Labour	Chris Leslie	Labour
Shrewsbury and Atcham	Paul Marsden	Labour	Paul Marsden	Labour
Sittingbourne and Sheppey	Derek Wyatt	Labour	Derek Wyatt	Labour
Skipton and Ripon	David Curry	Conservative	David Curry	Conservative
Sleaford and North Hykeham	Douglas Hogg	Conservative	Douglas Hogg	Conservative
Slough	Fiona Mactaggart	Labour	Fiona Mactaggart	Labour
Solihull	John Taylor	Conservative	John Taylor	Conservative
Somerton and Frome	David Heath	Liberal Democrat	David Heath	Liberal Democrat
South Antrim	David Burnside	Ulster Unionist	William McCrea	Democratic Unionist
South Cambridgeshire	Andrew Lansley	Conservative	Andrew Lansley	Conservative
South Derbyshire	Mark Todd	Labour	Mark Todd	Labour
South Dorset	Jim Knight	Labour	Ian Bruce	Conservative
South Down	Eddie McGrady	Social Democratic and Labour	Eddie McGrady	Social Democratic and Labour
South East Cambridgeshire	James Paice	Conservative	James Paice	Conservative
South East Cornwall	Colin Breed	Liberal Democrat	Colin Breed	Liberal Democrat
South Holland and The Deepings	John Hayes	Conservative	John Hayes	Conservative
South Norfolk	Richard Bacon	Conservative	John MacGregor	Conservative
South Ribble	David Borrow	Labour	David Borrow	Labour
South Shields	David Miliband	Labour	Dr David Clark	Labour
South Staffordshire	Sir Patrick Cormack	Conservative	Sir Patrick Cormack	Conservative
South Suffolk	Tim Yeo	Conservative	Tim Yeo	Conservative
South Swindon	Julia Drown	Labour	Julia Drown	Labour
South Thanet	Dr Stephen Ladyman	Labour	Dr Stephen Ladyman	Labour
South West Bedfordshire	Andrew Selous	Conservative	Sir David Madel	Conservative
South West Devon	Gary Streeter	Conservative	Gary Streeter	Conservative
South West Hertfordshire	Richard Page	Conservative	Richard Page	Conservative
South West Norfolk	Gillian Shephard	Conservative	Gillian Shephard	Conservative
South West Surrey	Virginia Bottomley	Conservative	Virginia Bottomley	Conservative
Southampton, Itchen	John Denham	Labour	John Denham	Labour
Southampton, Test	Dr Alan Whitehead	Labour	Dr Alan Whitehead	Labour
Southend West	David Amess	Conservative	David Amess	Conservative
Southport	Dr John Pugh	Liberal Democrat	Ronnie Fearn	Liberal Democrat
Spelthorne	David Wilshire	Conservative	David Wilshire	Conservative
Stafford	David Kidney	Labour	David Kidney	Labour
Staffordshire Moorlands	Charlotte Atkins	Labour	Charlotte Atkins	Labour
Stalybridge and Hyde	James Purnell	Labour	Tom Pendry	Labour
Stevenage	Barbara Follett	Labour	Barbara Follett	Labour
Stirling	Anne McGuire	Labour	Anne McGuire	Labour
Stockport	Ann Coffey	Labour	Ann Coffey	Labour
Stockton North	Frank Cook	Labour	Frank Cook	Labour
Stockton South	Dari Taylor	Labour	Dari Taylor	Labour
Stoke-on-Trent Central	Mark Fisher	Labour	Mark Fisher	Labour
Stoke-on-Trent North	Joan Walley	Labour	Joan Walley	Labour
Stoke-on-Trent South	George Stevenson	Labour	George Stevenson	Labour
Stone	William Cash	Conservative	William Cash	Conservative
Stourbridge	Debra Shipley	Labour	Debra Shipley	Labour
Strangford	Iris Robinson	Democratic Unionist	John Taylor	Ulster Unionist
Stratford-on-Avon	John Maples	Conservative	John Maples	Conservative
Strathkelvin and Bearsden	John Lyons	Labour	Sam Galbraith	Labour
Streatham	Keith Hill	Labour	Keith Hill	Labour
Stretford and Urmston	Beverley Hughes	Labour	Beverley Hughes	Labour
Stroud	David Drew	Labour Co-operative	David Drew	Labour Co-operative
Suffolk Coastal	John Gummer	Conservative	John Gummer	Conservative
Sunderland North	Bill Etherington	Labour	Bill Etherington	Labour
Sunderland South	Chris Mullin	Labour	Chris Mullin	Labour
Surrey Heath	Nick Hawkins	Conservative	Nick Hawkins	Conservative
Sutton and Cheam	Paul Burstow	Liberal Democrat	Paul Burstow	Liberal Democrat
Sutton Coldfield	Andrew Mitchell	Conservative	Sir Norman Fowler	Conservative
Swansea East	Donald Anderson	Labour	Donald Anderson	Labour
Swansea West	Alan Williams	Labour	Alan Williams	Labour
=== T ===
Constituency	Elected MP	Elected party	Previous MP	Previous party
Tamworth	Brian Jenkins	Labour	Brian Jenkins	Labour
Tatton	George Osborne	Conservative	Martin Bell	Independent
Taunton	Adrian Flook	Conservative	Jackie Ballard	Liberal Democrat
Teignbridge	Richard Younger-Ross	Liberal Democrat	Patrick Nicholls	Conservative
Telford	David Wright	Labour	Bruce Grocott	Labour
Tewkesbury	Laurence Robertson	Conservative	Laurence Robertson	Conservative
Thurrock	Andrew MacKinlay	Labour	Andrew MacKinlay	Labour
Tiverton and Honiton	Angela Browning	Conservative	Angela Browning	Conservative
Tonbridge and Malling	Sir John Stanley	Conservative	Sir John Stanley	Conservative
Tooting	Tom Cox	Labour	Tom Cox	Labour
Torbay	Adrian Sanders	Liberal Democrat	Adrian Sanders	Liberal Democrat
Torfaen	Paul Murphy	Labour	Paul Murphy	Labour
Torridge and West Devon	John Burnett	Liberal Democrat	John Burnett	Liberal Democrat
Totnes	Anthony Steen	Conservative	Anthony Steen	Conservative
Tottenham	David Lammy	Labour	David Lammy	Labour
Truro and St Austell	Matthew Taylor	Liberal Democrat	Matthew Taylor	Liberal Democrat
Tunbridge Wells	Archie Norman	Conservative	Archie Norman	Conservative
Tweeddale, Ettrick and Lauderdale	Michael Moore	Liberal Democrat	Michael Moore	Liberal Democrat
Twickenham	Dr Vincent Cable	Liberal Democrat	Dr Vincent Cable	Liberal Democrat
Tyne Bridge	David Clelland	Labour	David Clelland	Labour
Tynemouth	Alan Campbell	Labour	Alan Campbell	Labour
=== U ===
Constituency	Elected MP	Elected party	Previous MP	Previous party
Upminster	Angela Watkinson	Conservative	Keith Darvill	Labour
Upper Bann	David Trimble	Ulster Unionist	David Trimble	Ulster Unionist
Uxbridge	John Randall	Conservative	John Randall	Conservative
=== V ===
Constituency	Elected MP	Elected party	Previous MP	Previous party
Vale of Clwyd	Chris Ruane	Labour	Chris Ruane	Labour
Vale of Glamorgan	John Smith	Labour	John Smith	Vale of Glamorgan
Vale of York	Anne McIntosh	Conservative	Anne McIntosh	Conservative
Vauxhall	Kate Hoey	Labour	Kate Hoey	Labour
=== W ===
Constituency	Elected MP	Elected party	Previous MP	Previous party
Wakefield	David Hinchliffe	Labour	David Hinchliffe	Labour
Wallasey	Angela Eagle	Labour	Angela Eagle	Labour
Walsall North	David Winnick	Labour	David Winnick	Labour
Walsall South	Bruce George	Labour	Bruce George	Labour
Walthamstow	Neil Gerrard	Labour	Neil Gerrard	Labour
Wansbeck	Denis Murphy	Labour	Denis Murphy	Labour
Wansdyke	Dan Norris	Labour	Dan Norris	Labour
Wantage	Robert Jackson	Conservative	Robert Jackson	Conservative
Warley	John Spellar	Labour	John Spellar	Labour
Warrington North	Helen Jones	Labour	Helen Jones	Labour
Warrington South	Helen Southworth	Labour	Helen Southworth	Labour
Warwick and Leamington	James Plaskitt	Labour	James Plaskitt	Labour
Watford	Claire Ward	Labour	Claire Ward	Labour
Waveney	Bob Blizzard	Labour	Bob Blizzard	Labour
Wealden	Charles Hendry	Conservative	Sir Geoffrey Johnson-Smith	Conservative
Weaver Vale	Mike Hall	Labour	Mike Hall	Labour
Wellingborough	Paul Stinchcombe	Labour	Paul Stinchcombe	Labour
Wells	David Heathcoat-Amory	Conservative	David Heathcoat-Amory	Conservative
Welwyn Hatfield	Melanie Johnson	Labour	Melanie Johnson	Labour
Wentworth	John Healey	Labour	John Healey	Labour
West Aberdeenshire and Kincardine	Sir Robert Smith	Liberal Democrat	Sir Robert Smith	Liberal Democrat
West Bromwich East	Tom Watson	Labour	Peter Snape	Labour
West Bromwich West	Adrian Bailey	Labour Co-operative	Adrian Bailey	Labour Co-operative
West Chelmsford	Simon Burns	Conservative	Simon Burns	Conservative
West Derbyshire	Patrick McLoughlin	Conservative	Patrick McLoughlin	Conservative
West Dorset	Oliver Letwin	Conservative	Oliver Letwin	Conservative
West Ham	Tony Banks	Labour	Tony Banks	Labour
West Lancashire	Colin Pickthall	Labour	Colin Pickthall	Labour
West Renfrewshire	James Sheridan	Labour	Tommy Graham	Labour
West Suffolk	Richard Spring	Conservative	Richard Spring	Conservative
West Tyrone	Pat Doherty	Sinn Féin	William Thompson	Ulster Unionist
West Worcestershire	Sir Michael Spicer	Conservative	Sir Michael Spicer	Conservative
Westbury	Dr Andrew Murrison	Conservative	David Faber	Conservative
Western Isles	Calum Macdonald	Labour	Calum Macdonald	Labour
Westmorland and Lonsdale	Tim Collins	Conservative	Tim Collins	Conservative
Weston-Super-Mare	Brian Cotter	Liberal Democrat	Brian Cotter	Liberal Democrat
Wigan	Neil Turner	Labour	Neil Turner	Labour
Wimbledon	Roger Casale	Labour	Roger Casale	Labour
Winchester	Mark Oaten	Liberal Democrat	Mark Oaten	Liberal Democrat
Windsor	Michael Trend	Conservative	Michael Trend	Conservative
Wirral South	Ben Chapman	Labour	Ben Chapman	Labour
Wirral West	Stephen Hesford	Labour	Stephen Hesford	Labour
Witney	David Cameron	Conservative	Shaun Woodward	Conservative
Woking	Humfrey Malins	Conservative	Humfrey Malins	Conservative
Wokingham	John Redwood	Conservative	John Redwood	Conservative
Wolverhampton North East	Ken Purchase	Labour Co-operative	Ken Purchase	Labour Co-operative
Wolverhampton South East	Dennis Turner	Labour Co-operative	Dennis Turner	Labour Co-operative
Wolverhampton South West	Rob Marris	Labour	Jenny Jones	Labour
Woodspring	Dr Liam Fox	Conservative	Dr Liam Fox	Conservative
Worcester	Mike Foster	Labour	Mike Foster	Labour
Workington	Tony Cunningham	Labour	Dale Campbell-Savours	Labour
Worsley	Terry Lewis	Labour	Terry Lewis	Labour
Worthing West	Peter Bottomley	Conservative	Peter Bottomley	Conservative
The Wrekin	Peter Bradley	Labour	Peter Bradley	Labour
Wrexham	Ian Lucas	Labour	Dr John Marek	Labour
Wycombe	Paul Goodman	Conservative	Sir Ray Whitney	Conservative
Wyre Forest	Dr Richard Taylor	Independent	David Lock	Labour
Wythenshawe and Sale East	Paul Goggins	Labour	Paul Goggins	Labour
=== Y ===
Constituency	Elected MP	Elected party	Previous MP	Previous party
Yeovil	David Laws	Liberal Democrat	Paddy Ashdown	Liberal Democrat
Ynys Môn	Albert Owen	Labour	Ieuan Wyn Jones	Plaid Cymru
City of York	Hugh Bayley	Labour	Hugh Bayley	Labour

== By-elections ==
There were six by-elections in the 2001–2005 Parliament. Each were in seats held by the governing Labour party, four of which were held and two won by the Liberal Democrats. Four by-elections were a result of the death of the incumbent MP.

By - Election	Date	Incumbent	Party	Winner	Party	Cause
Ipswich	22 November 2001	Jamie Cann	Labour	Chris Mole	Labour	Death of Incumbent
Ogmore	14 February 2002	Sir Raymond Powell	Labour	Huw Irranca-Davies	Labour	Death of Incumbent
Brent East	18 September 2003	Paul Daisley	Labour	Sarah Teather	Liberal Democrats	Death of Incumbent
Leicester South	15 July 2004	Jim Marshall	Labour	Parmjit Singh Gill	Liberal Democrats	Death of Incumbent
Birmingham Hodge Hill	15 July 2004	Terry Davis	Labour	Liam Byrne	Labour	Resignation on appointment as Secretary-General of the Council of Europe
Hartlepool	30 September 2004	Peter Mandelson	Labour	Iain Wright	Labour	Resignation on appointment as European Commissioner

== Defections, Suspensions and Resignations ==
=== 2001 ===
- Paul Marsden (Shrewsbury and Atcham) - Joined the Liberal Democrats from Labour on 10 December

=== 2002 ===
- Andrew Hunter (Basingstoke) - resigned the Conservative whip on 2 October

=== 2003 ===
- Martin Smyth (Belfast South), David Burnside (South Antrim), and Jeffrey Donaldson (Lagan Valley) - Resigned the Ulster Unionist whip on 23 June
- George Galloway (Glasgow Kelvin) - Expelled from the Labour Party 23 October

=== 2004 ===
- Jeffrey Donaldson (Lagan Valley) - Joined the Democratic Unionist Party on 5 January
- Martin Smyth (Belfast South) and David Burnside (South Antrim) - Resumed taking the Ulster Unionist Whip on 9 January
- George Galloway (Glasgow Kelvin) - Formed RESPECT The Unity Coalition on 25 January
- Ann Winterton (Congleton) - Conservative whip was withdrawn on 25 February and restored on 31 March.
- Andrew Hunter (Basingstoke) - Took the Democratic Unionist Party whip on 10 December

=== 2005 ===
- Robert Jackson (Wantage) - Joined the Labour Party from the Conservatives on 15 January
- Jonathan Sayeed (Mid Bedfordshire) - Conservative whip temporarily suspended on 3 February to 7 March; whip permanently suspended later in March
- Howard Flight (Arundel and South Downs) - Conservative whip was withdrawn on 25 March.
- Paul Marsden (Shrewsbury and Atcham) - Resigned from the Liberal Democrats and declared his support for Labour on 5 April.
