= List of MPs for constituencies in Scotland (2001–2005) =

- Colours on map indicate the party allegiance of each constituency's MP.

This is a list of the 72 members of Parliament (MPs) elected to the House of Commons of the United Kingdom by Scottish constituencies for the Fifty-Third Parliament of the United Kingdom (2001 to 2005) at the 2001 United Kingdom general election.

== Composition ==
Affiliation	Members
Labour Party	56
Liberal Democrats	10
Scottish National Party	5
Conservative Party	1
Total	72

== List ==
MP	Constituency	Party	Notes
Aberdeen Central	Frank Doran	Labour	
Aberdeen North	Malcolm Savidge	Labour	
Aberdeen South	Anne Begg	Labour	
Airdrie and Shotts	Helen Liddell	Labour	
Angus	Michael Weir	Scottish National Party	
Argyll and Bute	Alan Reid	Scottish Liberal Democrats	
Ayr	Sandra Osborne	Labour	
Banff and Buchan	Alex Salmond	Scottish National Party	
Caithness, Sutherland and Easter Ross	John Thurso	Scottish Liberal Democrats	
Carrick, Cumnock and Doon Valley	George Foulkes	Labour Co-operative	
Central Fife	John MacDougall	Labour	
Clydebank and Milngavie	Tony Worthington	Labour	
Clydesdale	Jimmy Hood	Labour	
Coatbridge and Chryston	Tom Clarke	Labour	
Cumbernauld and Kilsyth	Rosemary McKenna	Labour	
Cunninghame North	Brian Wilson	Labour	
Cunninghame South	Brian Donohoe	Labour	
Dumbarton	John McFall	Labour Co-operative	
Dumfries	Russell Brown	Labour	
Dundee East	Iain Luke	Labour	
Dundee West	Ernie Ross	Labour	
Dunfermline East	Gordon Brown	Labour	
Dunfermline West	Rachel Squire	Labour	
East Kilbride	Adam Ingram	Labour	
East Lothian	Anne Picking	Labour	
Eastwood	Jim Murphy	Labour	
Edinburgh Central	Alistair Darling	Labour	
Edinburgh East and Musselburgh	Gavin Strang	Labour	
Edinburgh North and Leith	Mark Lazarowicz	Labour Co-operative	
Edinburgh Pentlands	Dr Lynda Clark	Labour	
Edinburgh South	Nigel Griffiths	Labour	
Edinburgh West	John Barrett	Liberal Democrat	
Falkirk East	Michael Connarty	Labour	
Falkirk West	Eric Joyce	Labour	
Galloway and Upper Nithsdale	Peter Duncan	Conservative	
Glasgow, Anniesland	John Robertson	Labour	
Glasgow Baillieston	Jimmy Wray	Labour	
Glasgow Cathcart	Tom Harris	Labour	
Glasgow Govan	Mohammad Sarwar	Labour	
Glasgow Kelvin	George Galloway	Labour	
Glasgow Maryhill	Ann McKechin	Labour	
Glasgow Pollok	Ian Davidson	Labour Co-operative	
Glasgow Rutherglen	Thomas McAvoy	Labour Co-operative	
Glasgow Shettleston	David Marshall	Labour	
Glasgow, Springburn	Michael Martin	None - Speaker	
Gordon	Malcolm Bruce	Liberal Democrat	
Greenock and Inverclyde	David Cairns	Labour	
Hamilton North and Bellshill	John Reid	Labour	
Hamilton South	Bill Tynan	Labour	
Inverness East, Nairn and Lochaber	David Stewart	Labour	
Kilmarnock and Loudoun	Des Browne	Labour	
Kirkcaldy	Dr Lewis Moonie	Labour Co-operative	
Linlithgow	Sir Tam Dalyell	Labour	
Livingston	Robin Cook	Labour	
Midlothian	David Hamilton	Labour	
Moray	Angus Robertson	Scottish National Party	
Motherwell and Wishaw	Frank Roy	Labour	
North East Fife	Sir Menzies Campbell	Liberal Democrat	
North Tayside	Pete Wishart	Scottish National Party	
Ochil	Martin O'Neill	Labour	
Orkney and Shetland	Alistair Carmichael	Liberal Democrat	
Paisley North	Irene Adams	Labour	
Paisley South	Douglas Alexander	Labour	Minister of State for Trade (2004 to 2005) Minister for the Cabinet Office and Chancellor of the Duchy of Lancaster (2003 to 2004) Minister of State for e-Commerce and Competitiveness (2001 to 2002)
Perth	Annabelle Ewing	Scottish National Party	
Ross, Skye and Inverness West	Charles Kennedy	Liberal Democrat	
Roxburgh and Berwickshire	Archy Kirkwood	Liberal Democrat	
Stirling	Anne McGuire	Labour	Lord Commissioner of the Treasury (2001–2002)
Strathkelvin and Bearsden	John Lyons	Labour	
Tweeddale, Ettrick and Lauderdale	Michael Moore	Liberal Democrat	
West Aberdeenshire and Kincardine	Sir Robert Smith	Liberal Democrat	
West Renfrewshire	James Sheridan	Labour	
Western Isles	Calum Macdonald	Labour	

== See also ==
- Lists of MPs for constituencies in Scotland
