= Tessa Munt =

British politician (born 1959)

Councillor Tessa Munt MP
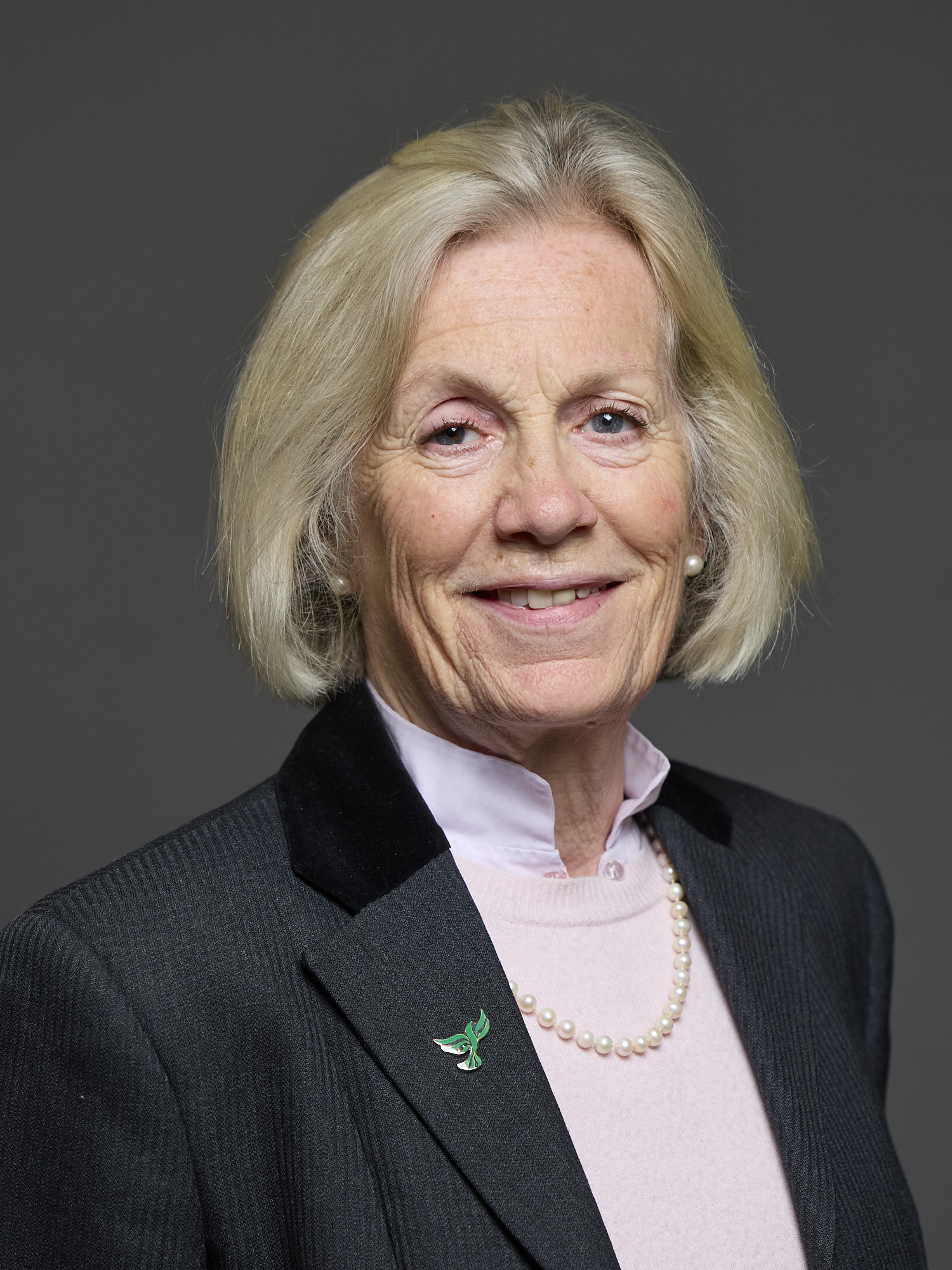
- Official portrait, 2024

Member of Parliament for Wells and Mendip Hills
- Incumbent
- Assumed office 4 July 2024
- Preceded by: James Heappey (Wells (Note: The Wells constituency was renamed "Wells and Mendip Hills" at the 2024 general election, with major boundary changes))
- Majority: 11,121 (22.08%)

Member of Parliament for Wells
- In office 6 May 2010 – 30 March 2015
- Preceded by: David Heathcoat-Amory
- Succeeded by: James Heappey

Member of Somerset Council for Wells
- Incumbent
- Assumed office 4 May 2017 Serving with Theo Butt-Philip (Since 2022)
- Preceded by: John Osman
- Majority: 1,494 (38.7%)

Personal details
- Born: 16 October 1959 (age 66) Surrey, England
- Party: Liberal Democrats (after 1997)
- Other political affiliations: Labour (mid-1990s)
- Spouse: Martin Munt (m. 1992, separated)
- Children: 2
- Education: Sutton High School, London
- Website: tessamunt.co.uk

Tessa Jane Munt (née Vasey) (born 16 October 1959) is a British Liberal Democrat politician. She is the Member of Parliament for Wells and Mendip Hills in Somerset, having previously been elected as the MP for Wells from 2010 to 2015 and serving as the Parliamentary Private Secretary (PPS) to the Secretary of State for Business, Innovation and Skills, Vince Cable. As a councillor on Somerset Council, she was the executive member for Children, Families and Education from 2022 until 2023.

== Early life ==
Her paternal grandfather was a politician in Kenya during the 1950s, whilst her uncle was a member of the Church of England synod. Her mother was raised within the Church of Scotland.

The eldest of four children born in Surrey, she was educated at a Roman Catholic Convent school until the age of eleven, and then at Reigate County School for Girls and the private Sutton High School, before finishing her education at an independent college. Munt has told the BBC that as a child, she was a victim of sexual abuse.

== Early career ==
Munt initially joined the international division of Midland Bank, before leaving after a year to join a local firm of solicitors. After three years, she started working for a local hotel, and after two years moved to East Anglia working in the company's sales and marketing team, before moving to personnel and later customer care training.

She then worked in administration for South Essex College at their Southend-on-Sea campus, before moving into teaching. She then worked for a period in social services, working with adults with learning difficulties. She also worked part-time as a volunteer for both Childline and the Environmental Investigation Agency. She married in 1992, and had two children.

She spent time working as the personal assistant to former international cricketer Phil Edmonds. She then started working for a solicitors' firm, before being asked to move by a former company partner to join the team at Forsters solicitors. She also spent five years as a Regional Advisory Panel member for the National Lottery Charities Board.

== Political career ==
Munt had joined the Labour Party in the early-1990s, but left after their election victory in 1997 due to the centralisation of party policy. She then campaigned in the late-1990s in Suffolk to preserve a Victorian school against a proposed development plan, where she met Andrew Phillips, Baron Phillips of Sudbury, and in 1999 after attending a party conference and meeting Norman Lamb, Munt joined the Liberal Democrats.

Munt was the party's candidate for South Suffolk at the 2001 general election, when she finished in third place with a 24.9% share of the votes. She also contested Ipswich at the 2001 by-election following the death of Labour MP Jamie Cann, coming third with 22.4% of the vote.

As her father lived in Wells, Somerset, a few weeks after her defeat, the local party committee offered her the option of standing at the Wells constituency. She stood at the 2005 general election, finishing in second place to sitting MP David Heathcoat-Amory with a 37.8% share of the vote.

=== Westminster: 2010–2015 ===
Munt was elected as the Member of Parliament for Wells at the 2010 general election with a majority of 800 votes over David Heathcoat-Amory, who admitted that his involvement in the United Kingdom Parliamentary expenses scandal played a part in his defeat.

Munt was a party whip in the House of Commons from 2010 until March 2012, although she threatened to resign from the post if the Trident nuclear missile system was renewed. She was later appointed as Parliamentary Private Secretary (PPS) to Business Secretary Vince Cable.

In July 2010, newspapers revealed details of an investigation by Sedgemoor District Council into her claims of single person council tax discount while having more than one other adult male registered to vote at her home, including a local GP, the broadcaster Andy Kershaw and the media advisor for the family of Madeleine McCann. On 6 September 2010, Sedgemoor District Council said that there were now no criminal proceedings relating to the single person discount on Council Tax and Munt was cleared of any wrongdoing.

On 27 January 2015, Munt resigned as PPS to Cable after she voted for a Commons amendment, not supported by the government, calling for a moratorium on fracking in the UK.

In the 2015 election, Munt lost the Wells parliamentary seat to the Conservative party candidate James Heappey by 7,585 votes. Munt was again the Liberal Democrat candidate for Wells in the following two general elections of 2017 and 2019, though she was unsuccessful both times.

=== County Hall: 2017–present ===
In 2017, Munt was elected as a councillor in Somerset, beating Somerset County Council leader, John Osman, by the slim majority of 95 votes. In 2022, she was re-elected to a term which transitioned to Somerset Council, a new unitary authority on 1 April 2023. From May 2022 until May 2023, Munt was part of Somerset Council's executive member for Children, Families and Education.

=== Return to Parliament ===
At the 2024 general election Munt was elected to the newly created seat of Wells and Mendip Hills, the successor to the majority of her old seat of Wells, following major boundary changes.

== Personal life ==
Munt lives in Somerset. She married Martin Munt in 1992, and they had two children before separating. She is a vegetarian, and has been a governor of Hugh Sexey Middle School in Blackford, Somerset.

== Notes ==
Parliament of the United Kingdom
Preceded by David Heathcoat-Amory	Member of Parliament for Wells; 2010–2015	Succeeded by James Heappey
Preceded by James Heappey (as Wells)	Member of Parliament for Wells and Mendip Hills; 2024–present	Incumbent
