= Angela Crawley =

Scottish SNP politician

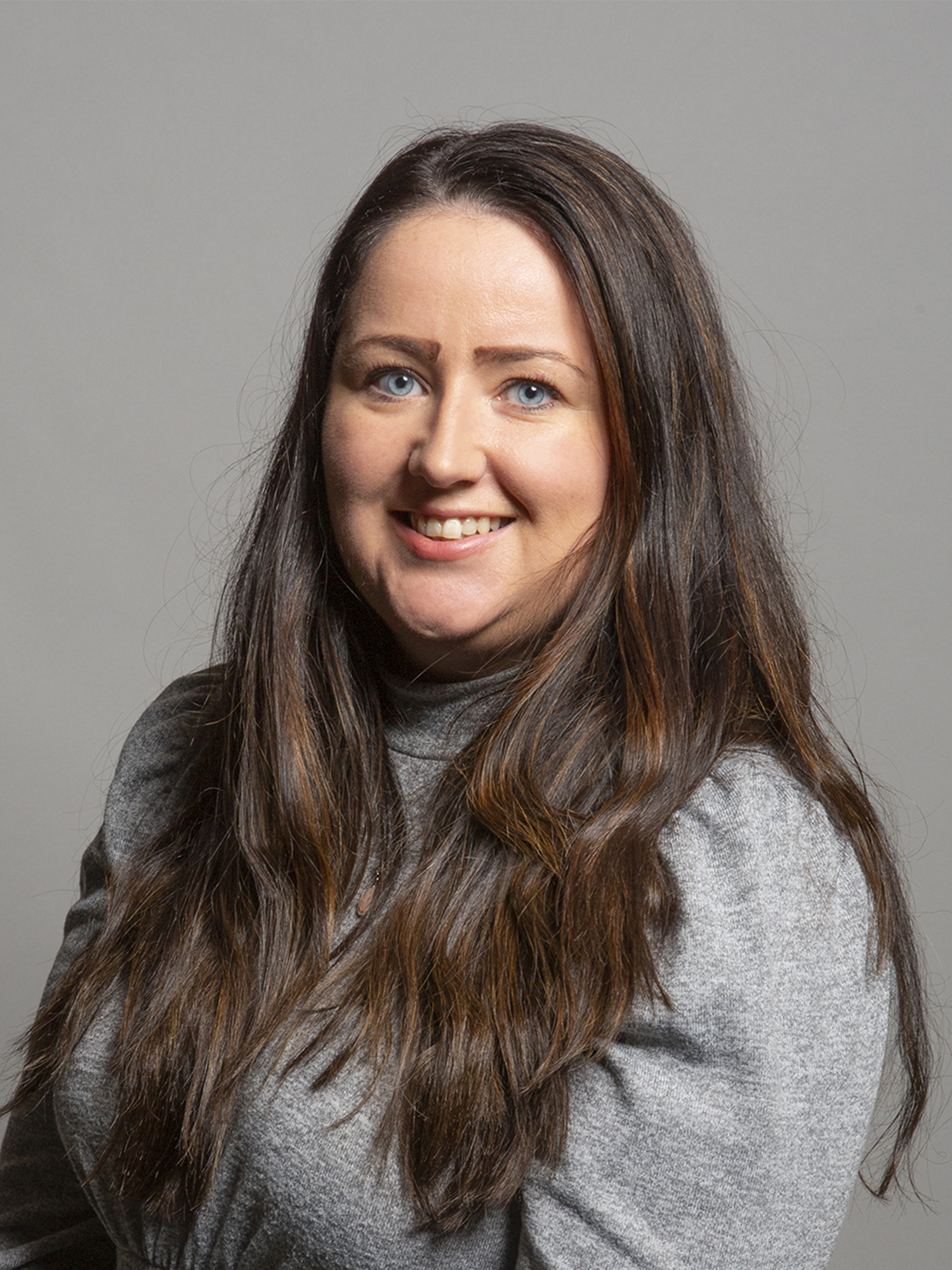
- Official portrait, 2019

SNP Attorney General Spokesperson in the House of Commons
- In office 1 February 2021 – 10 December 2022
- Leader: Ian Blackford
- Preceded by: Stuart McDonald
- Succeeded by: Patricia Gibson (2023)

Member of Parliament for Lanark and Hamilton East
- In office 7 May 2015 – 30 May 2024
- Preceded by: Jimmy Hood
- Succeeded by: Constituency abolished

Personal details
- Born: 3 June 1987 (age 39) Hamilton, Scotland
- Party: Scottish National Party
- Education: University of Stirling; University of Glasgow
- Website: Official website

Angela Crawley (born 3 June 1987) is a Scottish National Party politician who served as the Member of Parliament (MP) for Lanark and Hamilton East from 2015 to 2024. She served as the SNP Shadow Attorney General from 2021 to 2022. She was previously the SNP spokesperson for Women and Equalities, and a member of the Women and Equalities Committee of the House of Commons.

== Early life and career ==
Born in Hamilton, Crawley attended John Ogilvie High School. She studied Politics at the University of Stirling, graduating with a BA degree. She then spent several years living and working in Brighton for the Educational Travel Group. After being elected to Parliament, she received an LLB degree in law from the University of Glasgow.

She first stood for election to South Lanarkshire Council for the Hamilton South ward and was elected at the 2012 local elections with 1,255 first preferences and taking the second seat in the ward, exceeding the quota.

In 2014, she was appointed as the National Convenor of the SNP's youth wing, Young Scots for Independence; also sitting on the party's National Executive Committee.

In 2017, Crawley was named in the Forbes 30 Under 30 list for her work in Parliament. She very narrowly retained her Lanark and Hamilton East seat at the 2017 snap general election, at what was a tight three way marginal behind the Conservatives and Labour. It was the tighest three-way marginal between three parties for any seat since 1945.

In December 2016, Crawley stated in Parliament her view that "the law must be updated to recognise an individual's gender identity, which has nothing to do with their birth gender and everything to do with the gender they believe they are". Conservative MP Ben Howlett described Crawley in his response "as a great champion on trans issues".

Crawley has prioritised campaigning on LGBTQ+ Equality in Parliament. On 27 February 2017, she launched a new campaign for transgender and non binary equality. This involved her setting up a petition. In 2022, Crawley led a debate on 50 Years of Pride in the UK, stating that "trans people in 2022 are facing the same hate crime and discrimination that many of the LGBTI community faced in the 1980s", and asserting that LGBTQ+ rights are human rights.

Crawley has called for victims of domestic abuse to be exempted from the child maintenance charge, and wrote a letter to the then Home Secretary Amber Rudd on the issue in 2018.

In 2021, Crawley launched a campaign for paid miscarriage leave in the UK including the introduction of a Private Members Bill on the issue along with a national petition. She reintroduced the Private Members Bill in the 2022 Parliament.

On 15 June 2022, Crawley led a debate in Westminster on the merits of introducing a universal basic income (UBI).

On 23 June 2023, she announced that in order to be able to spend more time with her family, she would not stand at the 2024 general election.

== Personal life ==
In February 2016, she was included in The Independent's group photograph of 28 LGBT MPs and peers.

Parliament of the United Kingdom
| Preceded by Jimmy Hood | Member of Parliament for Lanark and Hamilton East; 2015–2024 | Constituency abolished |
