= James Heappey =

British politician (born 1981)

Major The Right Honourable James Heappey
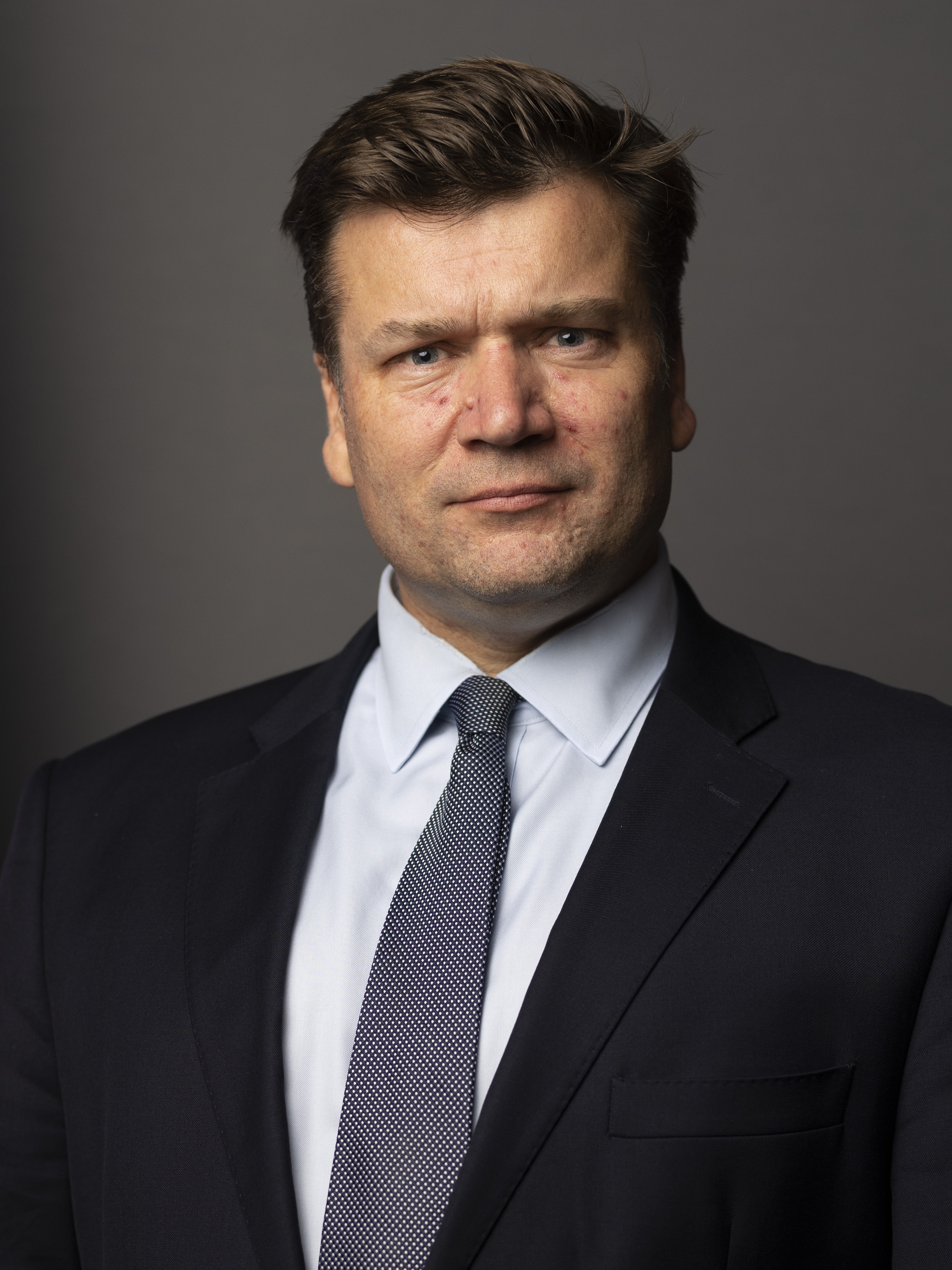
- Official portrait, 2022

Minister of State for the Armed Forces (Note: As Parliamentary Under-Secretary of State for the Armed Forces from February 2020 to July 2022; Minister of State for the Armed Forces and Veterans (attending Cabinet) from September to October 2022; Minister of State for the Armed Forces from July to September 2022 and from October 2022 to March 2024)
- In office 13 February 2020 – 26 March 2024
- Prime Minister: Boris Johnson; Liz Truss; Rishi Sunak
- Preceded by: Anne-Marie Trevelyan
- Succeeded by: Leo Docherty

Parliamentary Under-Secretary of State for Defence Procurement
- In office 16 December 2019 – 13 February 2020
- Prime Minister: Boris Johnson
- Preceded by: Anne-Marie Trevelyan
- Succeeded by: Jeremy Quin

Parliamentary Private Secretary to the Prime Minister
- In office 4 August 2019 – 16 December 2019 Serving with Alex Burghart
- Prime Minister: Boris Johnson
- Preceded by: Andrew Bowie
- Succeeded by: Trudy Harrison

Member of Parliament for Wells
- In office 7 May 2015 – 30 May 2024
- Preceded by: Tessa Munt
- Succeeded by: Tessa Munt (Wells and Mendip Hills (Note: The Wells constituency was renamed "Wells and Mendip Hills" at the 2024 general election, with major boundary changes))

Personal details
- Born: 30 January 1981 (age 45) Nailsea, England
- Party: Conservative
- Spouse: Kate Heappey
- Education: University of Birmingham (BA); Royal Military Academy Sandhurst
- Website: Official website

Military service
- Allegiance: United Kingdom
- Branch/service: British Army
- Years of service: 2004–2012
- Rank: Major
- Unit: Royal Gloucestershire, Berkshire and Wiltshire Regiment; The Rifles
- Battles/wars: War in Afghanistan; Iraq War

Major James Stephen Heappey (born 30 January 1981) is a British politician and former soldier who served as Minister of State for the Armed Forces from 2020 to 2024. A member of the Conservative Party, he served as the Member of Parliament (MP) for Wells in Somerset from 2015 to 2024.

He was Parliamentary Under-Secretary of State for the Armed Forces from 2020 to 2022, before being promoted to Minister of State by Prime Minister Boris Johnson in July 2022. In September 2022, Heappey was appointed to the larger portfolio of Armed Forces and Veterans' Minister and was given the right to attend Cabinet by new Prime Minister Liz Truss. In October 2022, new Prime Minister Rishi Sunak appointed Heappey as Minister of State for the Armed Forces, a ministerial role outside of Cabinet, and returned his responsibilities as Veterans' Minister to Johnny Mercer.

== Early life and education ==
James Heappey was born on 30 January 1981 in Nailsea, Somerset, and spent his early years in Sutton Coldfield, West Midlands, before moving back to Nailsea. He was privately educated at Queen Elizabeth's Hospital in Bristol and graduated in political science from the University of Birmingham.

== Military career ==
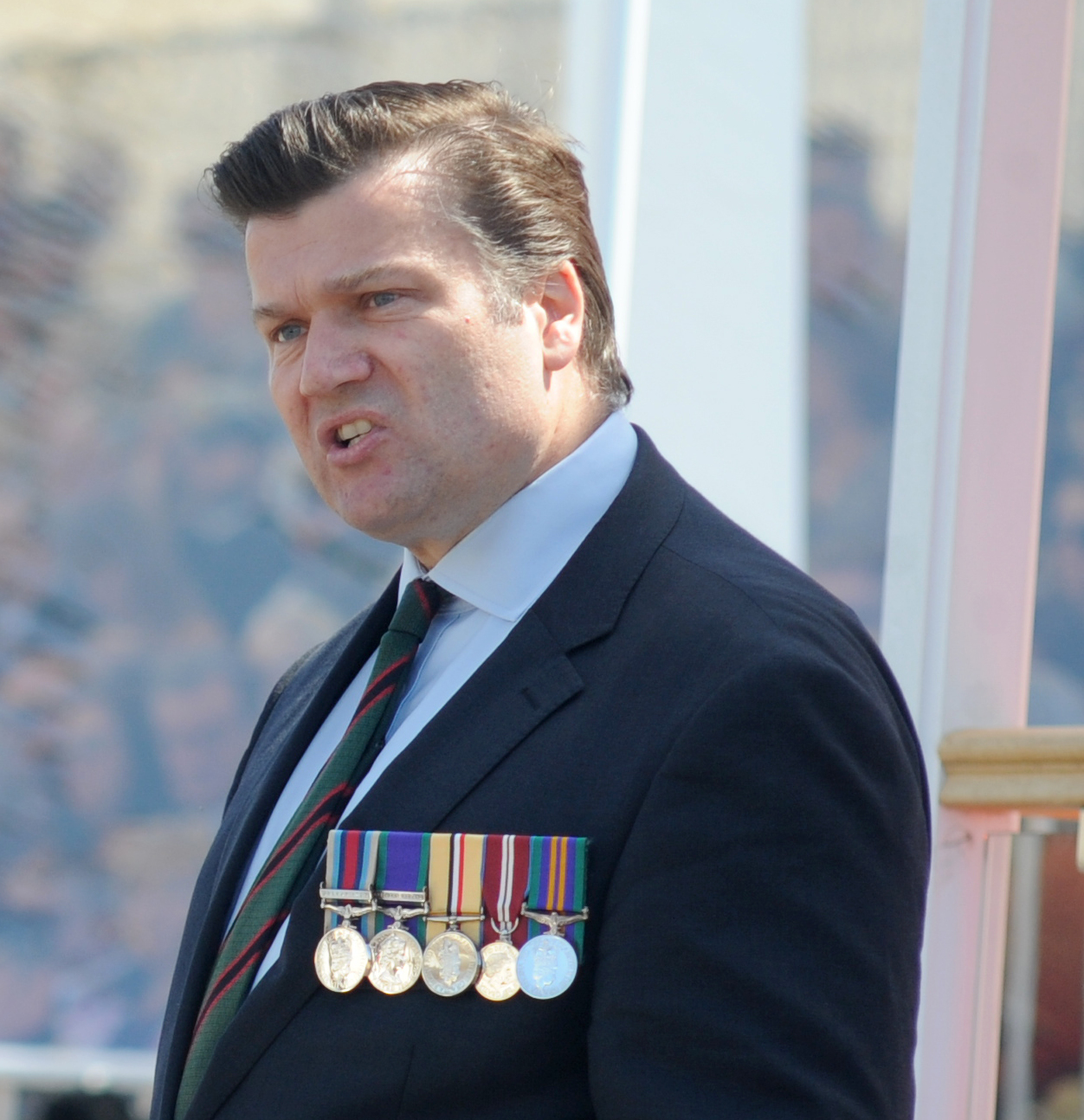
Heappey wearing his military medals in 2022

Following university, Heappey attended the Royal Military Academy Sandhurst. On 7 August 2004, he was commissioned in the British Army as a second lieutenant with seniority in that rank from 11 August 2001. As a university graduate, he was immediately promoted to lieutenant on 7 August 2004 with seniority from 11 August 2003. He was promoted to captain on 7 February 2007. Having attended Staff College, he was promoted to major on 31 July 2012.

Heappey served as an officer in the Royal Gloucestershire, Berkshire and Wiltshire Regiment and then The Rifles, the county regiment for Somerset, in Kabul in 2005, Northern Ireland in 2006, Basra in 2007 and Sangin in Helmand Province in 2009. He also served in Kenya, and in 2011 he was posted to the Ministry of Defence in London, where he worked as executive officer on the General Staff. He retired from the British Army on 2 November 2012 with the rank of major.

After leaving the British Army, he worked as a researcher for the Conservative MP for North Somerset, Liam Fox.

== Parliamentary career ==
At the 2015 general election, Heappey was elected to Parliament as MP for Wells with 46.1% of the vote and a majority of 7,585.

He used his maiden speech in the House of Commons to encourage the Government to continue addressing the problems that many rural communities face, including poor road connections, limited access to the rail network, weak phone signals and slow broadband speeds.

In October 2015, Heappey succeeded Nick de Bois as the Chair of the All Party Parliamentary Group for the UK Events Industry. He also serves as Vice Chairman of the All Party Parliamentary Group for Rural Business, a group which seeks to secure policy outcomes that promote the sustainable growth of the rural economy.

From July 2015 to October 2016, Heappey served on the House of Commons' Energy and Climate Change Select Committee. He backed the Government's decision to give the go-ahead for the Hinkley Point C nuclear power station, in particular citing the benefits for the local economy of Somerset. Heappey has also called for greater exploitation of the resources and expertise available in the marine energy sector. He expressed disappointment in January 2016 when, despite his lobbying efforts, the Conservative Government approved the construction of a 40-mile stretch of power lines to link the Hinkley Point C power-station and Avonmouth.

In May 2016, it was reported that Heappey was one of a number of Conservative MPs being investigated by police in the United Kingdom general election, 2015 party spending investigation, for allegedly spending more than the legal limit on constituency election campaign expenses. In May 2017, the Crown Prosecution Service said that while there was evidence of inaccurate spending returns, it did not "meet the test" for further action.

Although sceptical about some aspects of the European Union, Heappey was opposed to Brexit prior to the 2016 EU membership referendum. He later voted in favour of the Government's timetable to trigger Article 50 of the Treaty on European Union before the end of March 2017. On 15 January 2019 he voted in favour of Theresa May's Brexit deal.

Heappey was re-elected as MP for Wells at the snap 2017 general election with an increased vote share of 50.1% and a decreased majority of 7,582. After the election, he served as the Parliamentary Private Secretary to former Secretary of State for Transport Chris Grayling.

Heappey endorsed Boris Johnson to be leader of the Conservative Party during the 2019 leadership election, and served as his Parliamentary Private Secretary in a job share with Alex Burghart from August to December 2019.

At the 2019 general election, Heappey was again re-elected, with an increased vote share of 54.1% and an increased majority of 9,991.

In December 2019, Heappey left the Prime Minister's Office and became Parliamentary Under-Secretary of State for Defence Procurement, a junior ministerial appointment at the Ministry of Defence. In January 2020, Heappey awarded £184m to Ascent Flight Training, a consortium that the National Audit Office had criticised, in September 2019, for its poor performance and failure to meet "contractual obligations".

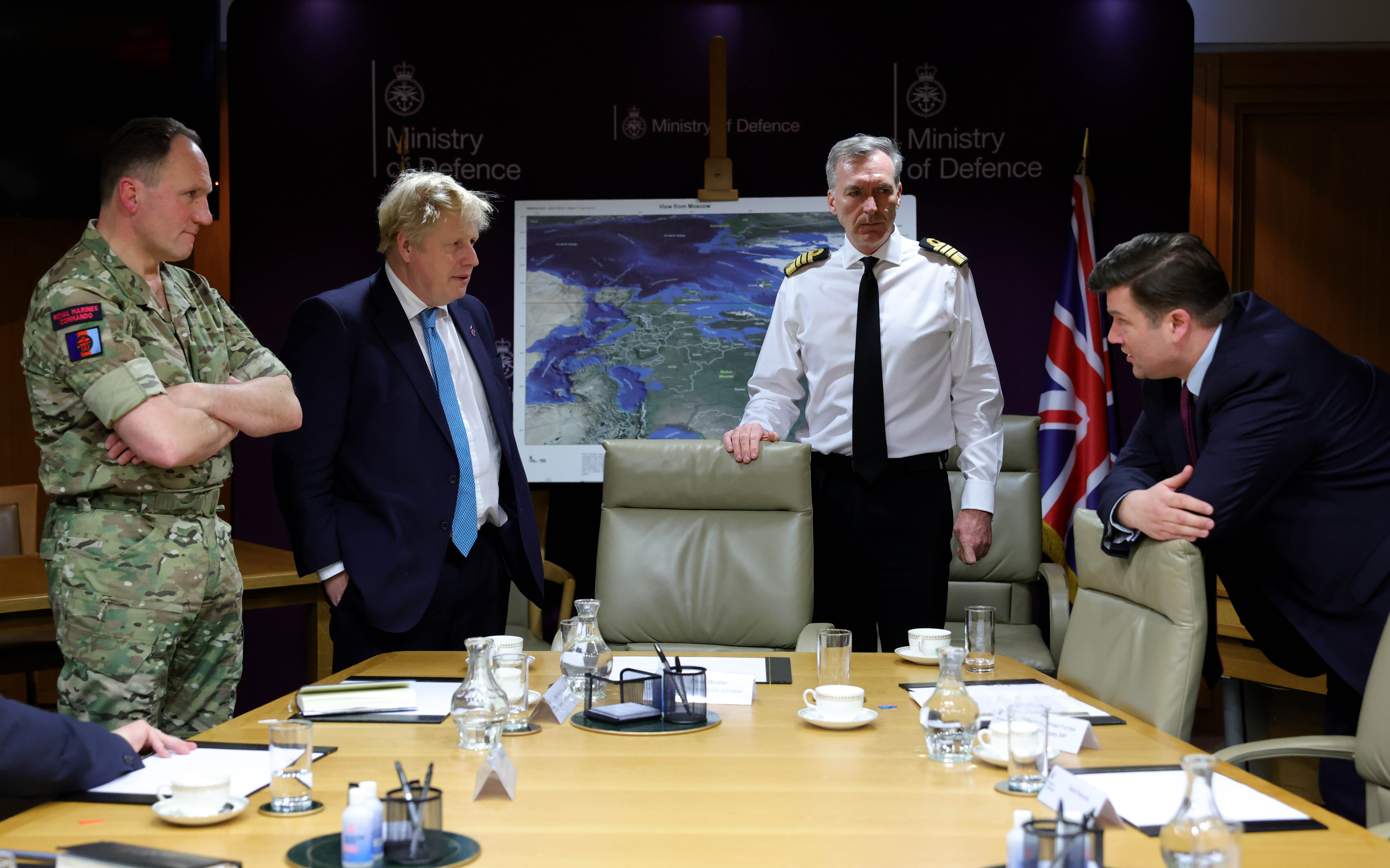
Heappey (right) during a Ministry of Defence briefing in 2022

In February 2020, Johnson appointed Heappey Parliamentary Under-Secretary of State for the Armed Forces as part of a cabinet reshuffle.

In March 2022, Heappey admitted on LBC that despite earning £106,619 a year from his parliamentary salary he was "pretty worried" about going into his overdraft each month.

In April 2022, Heappey said it was legitimate during the 2022 Russian invasion for Ukraine to use British supplied weapons for strikes onto Russian territory.

In July 2022, Heappey was promoted to Minister of State by Johnson. That same month he announced his support for Liz Truss in the Conservative leadership election. In September 2022, following Truss's election, Heappey was re-appointed as a Minister of State in the Ministry of Defence as the Minister for the Armed Forces and Veterans; he was also given the right to attend Truss's Cabinet as part of his role. He was appointed to the Privy Council entitling him to the prefix "The Right Honourable" for life. In October 2022, Heappey said he would resign if Truss reneged on a pledge to raise defence spending to 3% of GDP by 2030.

In October 2022, following Truss's resignation as leader of the Conservative Party, Heappey announced his support for Rishi Sunak, as the next leader of the Conservative Party, despite Sunak's refusal to commit to raise defence spending to 3% of GDP by 2030.

Heappey was re-appointed Minister of State for the Armed Forces by Prime Minister Rishi Sunak on 26 October 2022 but lost the role of Veterans Minister and the right to attend Cabinet to Johnny Mercer.

On 17 May 2023, he was reselected for the 2024 general election by his local Conservative Association.

In February 2024, BBC Panorama found that UK Special Forces had prevented Afghan Special Forces from relocating to the UK. In response, Heappey acknowledged that some decisions were "inconsistent" and the Government would reassess approximately 2,000 applications. Heappey claimed some applications had been unsuccessful because the government did "not hold comprehensive employment or payment records in the same way as we do for other applicants". This account was disputed by a former special forces officer who argued that Heappey had "either been mis-briefed or misled. Either way, it shows a real lack of professional curiosity on his part".

In March 2024, Heappey announced that he would be standing down as Minister of State for the Armed Forces at the end of the month and would not contest the 2024 general election.

On 26 March 2024, he resigned as minister and was replaced by Minister of State for Europe Leo Docherty.

=== Scottish referendum incident ===
During the 2017 general election, he apologised for an incident when meeting the sixth form at Millfield School in Street, Somerset. Heappey asked pupils how they would vote in the proposed second Scottish independence referendum, and a Scottish girl said she would support independence. Some reports asserted that Heappey then asked her "Why don’t you fuck off back to Scotland?", but The Guardian reported Heappey's statement that he told her to "fuck off", but did not say "back to Scotland". In his apology, Heappey said that the comment had been intended as a joke.

The Liberal Democrat candidate for Wells, Tessa Munt, condemned Heappey's use of what she called "bullying, racist and abusive language to dismiss a teenage schoolgirl engaging in political debate." In Scotland, Heappey's conduct was described as "appalling behaviour" by the Scottish National Party leader Nicola Sturgeon, and as "utterly inappropriate" by Ruth Davidson, leader of the Scottish Conservative Party.

=== Parliamentary donations ===
As of 2014, Heappey had declared three donations totalling £10,500. The largest single item Mr Heappey declared was a donation worth £5,000 from the businessman, and climate change denier, Neil Record.

Heappey also recorded a donations of £2,500 from the Dunchurch Lodge Stud Company and £3,000 from James Drummond.

== Post-Parliamentary career ==
In July 2024, Heappey was one of five politicians to cover for James O'Brien's radio show on LBC, as part of the station's "Guest Week".

In September 2024, Heappey began working as a senior analyst for HPO Technologies, a provider of Human Performance Optimisation (HPO) software, which also had a particular focus on the Armed Forces. On 18 December 2024, Heappey was reported to the Cabinet Office for breaching anti-corruption rules after failing to get approval from the Advisory Committee on Business Appointments (ACOBA) before signing a contract with HPO Technologies. In his letter to Heappey ACOBA Chair Lord Pickles said there was an "obvious overlap" between his responsibilities in office, and the job as a senior analyst in a firm operating in the defence sector.

== Personal life ==
Heappey lives in London and the Somerset town of Axbridge with his wife Kate and two children.

His brother Matthew works in financial services and was selected as the Conservative prospective parliamentary candidate for Bath at the 2024 general election in May 2023, before standing down in September of the same year.

== Honours ==

Ribbon	Description	Notes
	Operational Service Medal for Afghanistan	With "AFGHANISTAN" Clasp
	General Service Medal	With "NORTHERN IRELAND" Clasp
	Iraq Medal	
	Queen Elizabeth II Diamond Jubilee Medal	2012; UK Version of this Medal
	Accumulated Campaign Service Medal	24 Months Accumulated Campaign Service

== Notes ==
Parliament of the United Kingdom
Preceded by Tessa Munt	Member of Parliament for Wells; 2015–2024	Succeeded by Tessa Munt (as Wells and Mendip Hills)
Political offices
Preceded by Andrew Bowie	Parliamentary Private Secretary to the Prime Minister; Serving with Alex Burghart; 2019	Succeeded by Trudy Harrison
Preceded by Anne-Marie Trevelyan	Minister for Defence Procurement; 2019–2020	Succeeded by Jeremy Quin
Preceded by Anne-Marie Trevelyan as Minister of State	Parliamentary Under-Secretary of State for the Armed Forces; 2020–2024	Succeeded by Leo Docherty
Preceded by Johnny Mercer	Minister of State for Veterans' Affairs; 2022	Succeeded by Johnny Mercer
