= List of MPs for constituencies in Wales (2001–2005) =

- Colours on map indicate the party allegiance of each constituency's MP.

This is a list of members of Parliament in Wales, elected for the Fifty-Third Parliament of the United Kingdom in the 2001 general election. They are arranged by party. See also: Members of the National Assembly for Wales.

== Labour Party ==
- Nicholas Ainger
- Donald Anderson
- Kevin Brennan
- Chris Bryant
- Martin Caton
- Ann Clwyd
- Wayne David
- Denzil Davies
- Huw Edwards
- Paul Flynn
- Hywel Francis
- Win Griffiths
- Peter Hain
- Dave Hanson
- Dai Havard
- Alan Howarth
- Kim Howells
- Huw Irranca-Davies (from 2002)
- Jackie Lawrence
- Jon Owen Jones
- Martyn Jones
- Alun Michael
- Julie Morgan
- Paul Murphy
- Albert Owen
- Sir Raymond Powell (died December 2001)
- Chris Ruane
- John Smith
- Llew Smith
- Mark Tami
- Gareth Thomas
- Don Touhig
- Alan Williams
- Betty Williams

== Liberal Democrats ==
- Lembit Öpik
- Roger Williams

== Plaid Cymru ==
- Elfyn Llwyd
- Adam Price
- Simon Thomas
- Hywel Williams

== See also ==
- Lists of MPs for constituencies in Wales
