= 2001 Ipswich by-election =

UK parliamentary by-election

- 22 November 2001
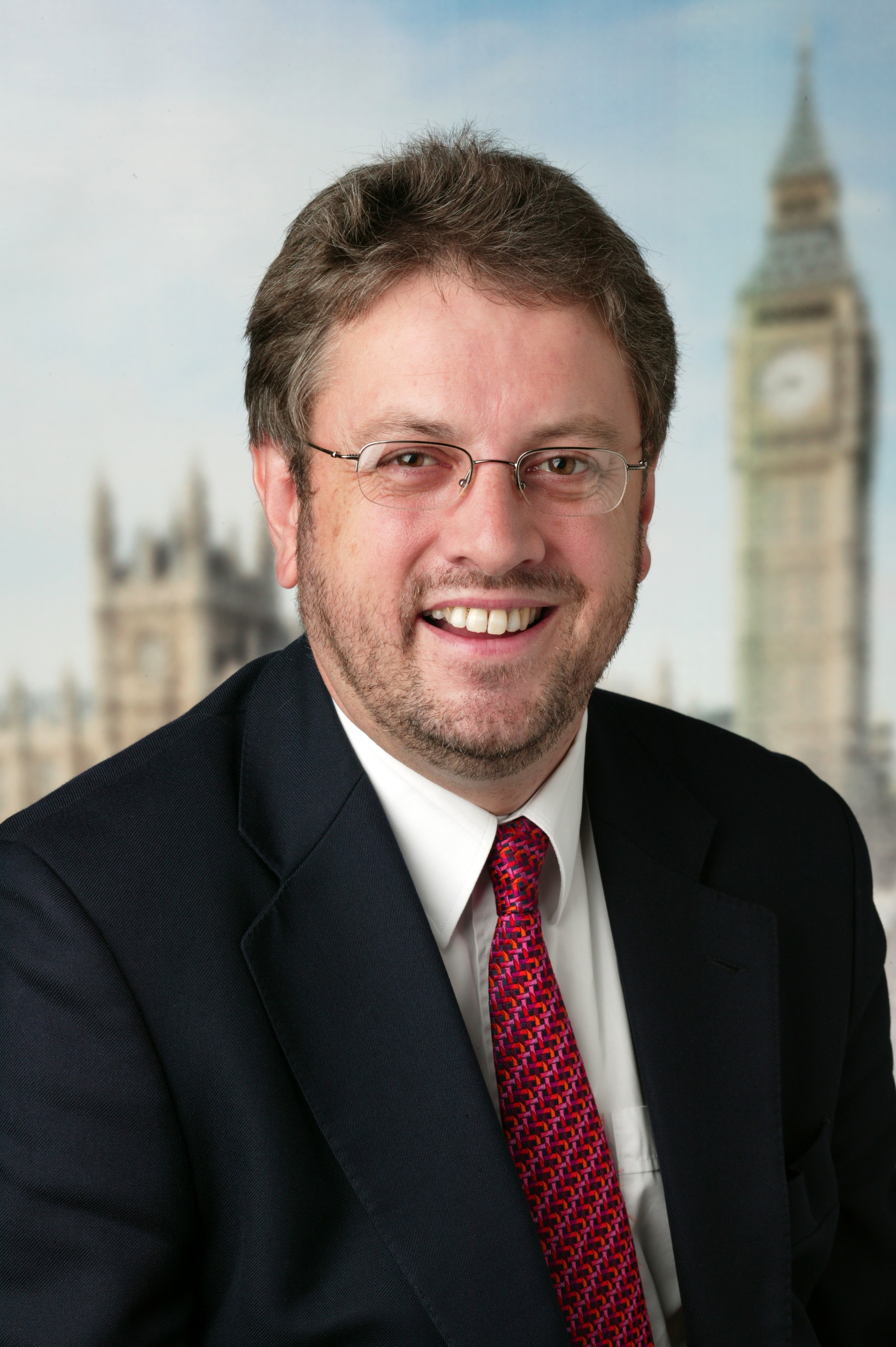

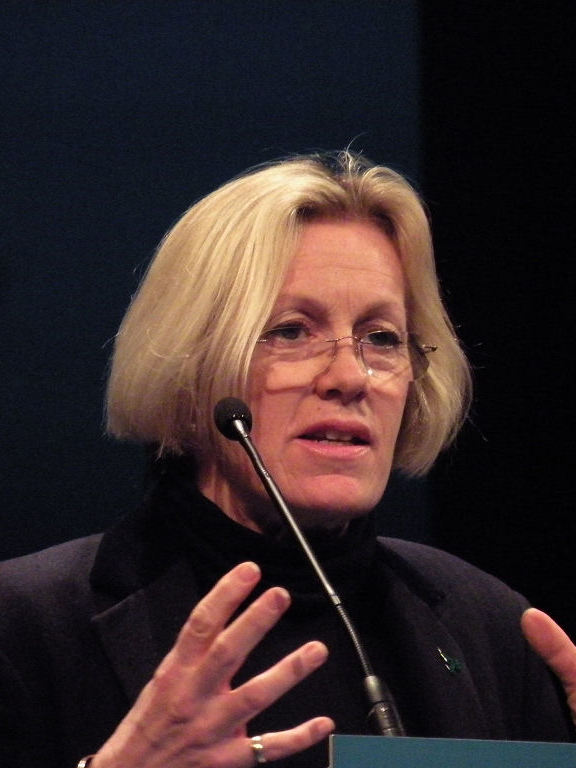
	First party	Second party	Third party
Candidate	Chris Mole	Paul West	Tessa Munt
Party	Labour	Conservative	Liberal Democrats
Popular vote	11,881	7,794	6,146
Percentage	43.4%	28.4%	22.4%
Swing	▼8.0pp	▼2.1pp	▲7.2pp
MP before election
Jamie Cann
Labour
Elected MP
Chris Mole
Labour

A by-election for the United Kingdom parliamentary constituency of Ipswich was held on 22 November 2001 following the death of incumbent Labour Party MP Jamie Cann. It was won by Chris Mole, who held the seat for Labour.

It was first of six by-elections which took place during the 2001–2005 parliament.

With Labour still basking in the glow of their landslide general election victory just five months earlier, no opposition party was able to mount an effective challenge. The Liberal Democrats improved their position somewhat but remained in third place, and Mole was returned with a majority of over 4,000 votes.

The declaration broke with tradition by using live computer images, club music and lasers after the result was announced.

== Background ==
Sitting member of Parliament (MP), Jamie Cann of the Labour Party, died on 15 October 2001, thus triggering a by-election to fill the seat. Cann had been MP for Ipswich since 1992.

== Result ==
By-election 22 November 2001: Ipswich
Party	Candidate	Votes	%	±%
Labour	Chris Mole	11,881	43.4	−8.0
Conservative	Paul West	7,794	28.4	−2.1
Liberal Democrats	Tessa Munt	6,146	22.4	+7.2
CPA	David Coope	581	2.1	New
UKIP	Jonathan Wright	276	1.0	−0.6
Green	Tony Slade	255	0.9	New
Legalise Cannabis	John Ramirez	236	0.9	New
Socialist Alliance	Peter Leach	152	0.6	−0.2
English Independence	Nicolas Winskill	84	0.3	New
Majority		4,087	14.9	−5.8
Turnout		27,405	40.2	−16.8
Labour hold		Swing	-5.9	

== Previous result ==
General election 2001: Ipswich
Party	Candidate	Votes	%	±%
Labour	Jamie Cann	19,952	51.3	−1.4
Conservative	Edward Wild	11,871	30.5	−0.6
Liberal Democrats	Terence Gilbert	5,904	15.2	+3.0
UKIP	William Vinyard	624	1.6	+1.2
Socialist Alliance	Peter Leach	305	0.8	New
Socialist Labour	Shaun Gratton	217	0.6	New
Majority		8,081	20.8	−0.8
Turnout		38,873	57.0	−15.2
Labour hold		Swing	-0.8	

== See also ==
- Lists of United Kingdom by-elections
