= Michael Irvine =

British politician (born 1939)

Member of Parliament for Ipswich
- In office 11 June 1987 – 16 March 1992
- Preceded by: Ken Weetch
- Succeeded by: Jamie Cann

Personal details
- Born: Michael Irvine; 21 October 1939 (age 86) London
- Party: Conservative
- Parent(s): Arthur Irvine (Father)

Michael Fraser Irvine (born 21 October 1939) is a former British Conservative Party politician.

== Political career ==
He stood for Bishop Auckland at the 1979 general election, but was defeated by Labour's Derek Foster.

Against the national trend, Irvine was elected Member of Parliament (MP) for Ipswich at the 1987 general election, unseating the Labour incumbent Kenneth Weetch. At the subsequent 1992 general election, however, Irvine lost the seat back to Labour's Jamie Cann.

== Family ==
He is the son of Labour MP Sir Arthur Irvine, QC, who was Solicitor General from 1967 to 1970.

Parliament of the United Kingdom
Preceded by Ken Weetch	Member of Parliament for Ipswich; 1987 – 1992	Succeeded by Jamie Cann
