= Ken Weetch =

British Labour politician (1933–2026)

Member of Parliament for Ipswich
- In office 10 October 1974 – 18 May 1987
- Preceded by: Ernle Money
- Succeeded by: Michael Irvine

Personal details
- Born: Kenneth Thomas Weetch; 17 September 1933 Abercarn, Monmouthshire, Wales
- Died: 5 February 2026 (aged 92) United Kingdom
- Party: Labour
- Education: London School of Economics

Kenneth Thomas Weetch (17 September 1933 – 5 February 2026) was a British Labour Party politician. He was a Member of Parliament from 1974 to 1987.

== Early life and teaching career ==
Weetch was born in Abercarn, Wales, on 17 September 1933, the son of a coal miner. His family were poor, and he grew up in a wooden shack with no running water. Having passed his 11-plus, he was educated at Newbridge Grammar School in nearby Caerphilly and later at the London School of Economics and Institute of Education, where he qualified as a teacher. He held various teaching posts, eventually becoming head of the history department at Hockerill College of Education in Bishop's Stortford, from where he went on to become a Member of Parliament.

== Parliamentary career ==
Having unsuccessfully contested Saffron Walden in the 1970 general election, Weetch was selected for Ipswich and won the seat at the October 1974 general election. Ipswich was a highly marginal constituency, but Weetch managed to secure an increased majority in 1979 – against the prevailing Conservative trend – and held on in 1983 despite the fact that only two other Labour MPs (Michael Cocks and Oonagh McDonald) were elected in the whole of southern England outside of London that year. Again bucking the trend, at the 1987 general election he surprisingly lost his seat to the Conservative candidate Michael Irvine.

Weetch identified strongly with the right wing of the Labour Party, and shortly after being elected in 1974 he joined The Manifesto Group. Having supported Anthony Crosland in the 1976 Labour Party leadership election, he then went on to become parliamentary private secretary to Bill Rodgers at the Department of Transport. However, unlike many of the 'moderates' on the Labour right, Weetch also possessed a populist streak, which manifested itself in stubborn opposition to Britain's membership of the European Economic Community (EEC) and a refusal to leave Labour when Rodgers and others broke away to form the Social Democratic Party (SDP) in 1981. He was also supportive of the Palestinian cause at a time when many in the party were still pro-Israel. Beyond party issues, Weetch was perhaps best known for his efforts in Parliament to end the monopoly enjoyed by solicitors over conveyancing.

== After parliament ==
A popular constituency MP (so much so that he was occasionally dubbed "Mr Ipsweetch"), Weetch was not prepared for the consequences of losing his seat, but he eventually managed to secure roles teaching economics and working as a parliamentary consultant alongside the former Conservative MP Frederick Silvester. Outside of his working life he enjoyed playing piano in pubs, something he first did to earn money while an impecunious student. He also listed "eating junk food" as a hobby in Who's Who, and memorably once told Margaret Thatcher that he intended to continue eating whatever he pleased after she reprimanded him for choosing a plate of highly calorific apple crumble and custard while standing behind him in the queue at the House of Commons canteen.

Weetch died on 5 February 2026, at the age of 92.

== Sources ==
- The Times Guide to the House of Commons, Times Newspapers Ltd, 1987

Parliament of the United Kingdom
Preceded by Ernle Money	Member of Parliament for Ipswich; October 1974–1987	Succeeded by Michael Irvine
