= Ernle Money =

British politician (1931–2013)

Member of Parliament for Ipswich
- In office 18 June 1970 – 10 October 1974
- Preceded by: Dingle Foot
- Succeeded by: Ken Weetch

Personal details
- Born: Ernle David Drummond Money; 17 February 1931
- Died: 14 April 2013 (aged 82)
- Party: Conservative
- Education: Marlborough College; Oriel College, Oxford

Ernle David Drummond Money CBE (17 February 1931 – 14 April 2013) was a Conservative Party Member of Parliament for Ipswich.

== Biography ==
Money was educated at Marlborough College and Oriel College, Oxford. He served in the Suffolk Regiment from 1949 to 1951. He was called to the Bar in 1958.

Money was elected MP for Ipswich in the 1970 general election with a majority of only 13 votes, the lowest majority of that election. The first Conservative to win the seat since the Second World War, he defeated Labour incumbent Sir Dingle Foot (Michael Foot's brother) and was reelected in the February 1974 election with a slightly increased majority of 259, although he subsequently lost the seat in the October 1974 election to Labour's Kenneth Weetch by a margin of 1,733 votes.

Money retired to Eastbourne in the 1990s. In 2010 he was reported in local press urging voters not to re-elect Eastbourne's Conservative MP Nigel Waterson but instead to vote for his Liberal Democrat opponent Stephen Lloyd. Money had homes in both Eastbourne and Malta.

Parliament of the United Kingdom
Preceded by Dingle Foot	Member of Parliament for Ipswich; 1970–October 1974	Succeeded by Ken Weetch
