= Chris Mole =

British Labour Party politician

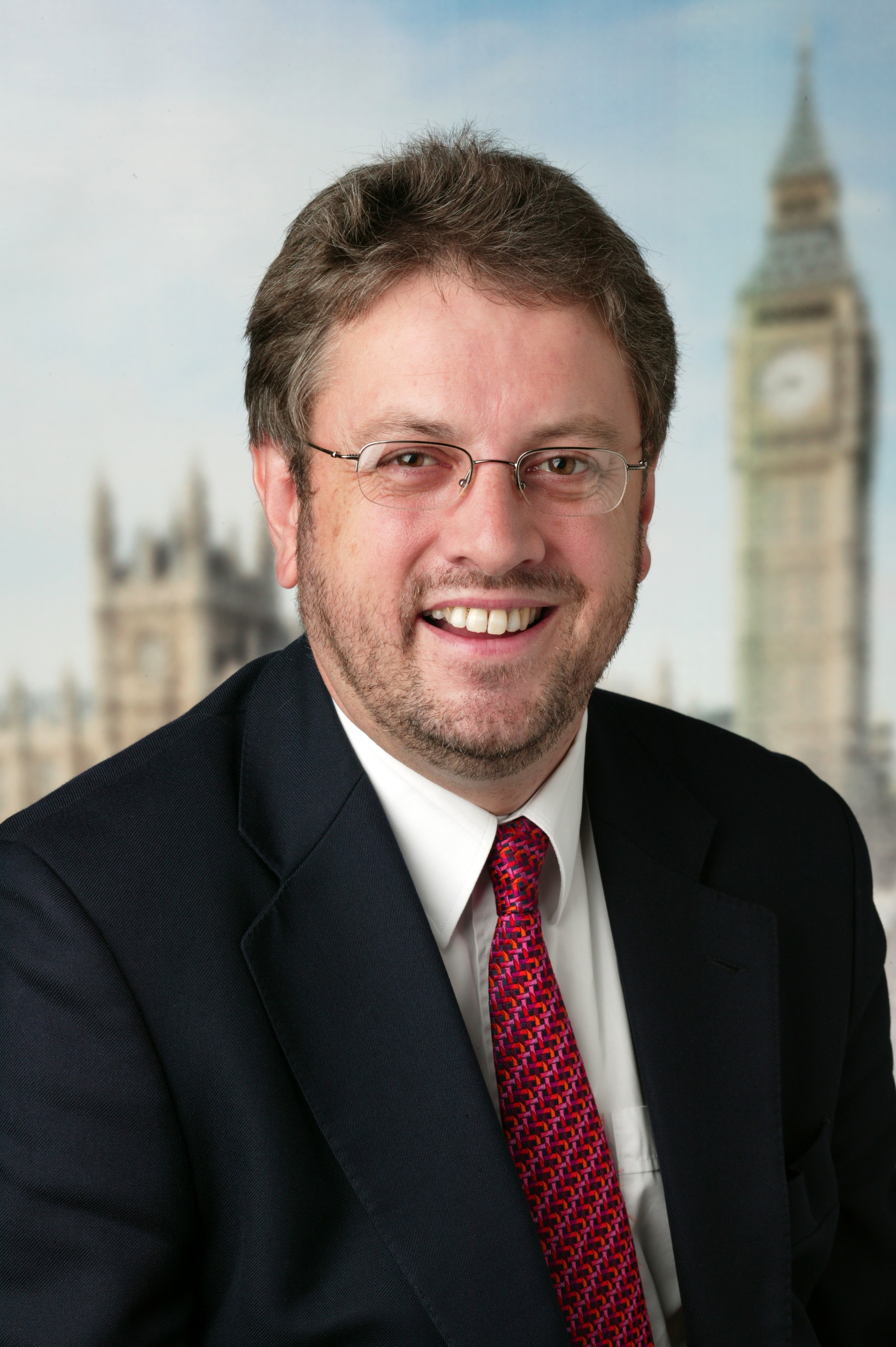
- Official portrait, 2010

Parliamentary Under-Secretary of State for Transport
- In office 5 June 2009 – 11 May 2010
- Prime Minister: Gordon Brown
- Preceded by: Jim Fitzpatrick
- Succeeded by: Mike Penning

Assistant Government Whip
- In office 6 October 2008 – 5 June 2009
- Prime Minister: Gordon Brown
- Chief Whip: Nick Brown

Member of Parliament for Ipswich
- In office 22 November 2001 – 12 April 2010
- Preceded by: Jamie Cann
- Succeeded by: Ben Gummer

Leader of Suffolk County Council
- In office May 1993 – 22 November 2001
- Preceded by: Christopher Penn
- Succeeded by: Jane Hore

Labour Group Leader on Suffolk County Council
- In office November 1989 – 22 November 2001
- Preceded by: Mick Cornish
- Succeeded by: Jane Hore

Suffolk County Councillor for Ipswich Town
- In office 4 May 1989 – 22 November 2001
- Preceded by: Julian Cusack
- Succeeded by: Kevan Lim

Suffolk County Councillor for St. Clements
- In office 2 May 1985 – 4 May 1989
- Preceded by: M Pluke
- Succeeded by: B Chaplin

Personal details
- Born: 16 March 1958 (age 68) Bromley, Kent
- Party: Labour
- Spouse: Shona Gibb
- Children: 2
- Education: University of Kent

Christopher David Mole (born 16 March 1958) is a British Labour Party politician, who was the Member of Parliament for Ipswich from a by-election in 2001, after the death of Jamie Cann, and was re-elected in 2005. He was Parliamentary Under Secretary of State at the Department for Transport, until his defeat in the 2010 general election by Ben Gummer of the Conservative Party.

== Early life ==
Mole attended Dulwich College. He gained a degree in Electronics from the University of Kent and moved to Ipswich in 1981 to work at the BT Laboratories at Martlesham Heath. During that time he served as Branch Secretary of the Research Branch of the white collar BT-only union then called the STE. It is now a cross industry union called Connect.

He was first elected to Suffolk County Council in 1985 and represented a central Ipswich division for 18 years. He was Deputy Chair of EEDA, the regional development agency for the East of England, from 1998 and was Leader of Suffolk County Council from 1993, named Council of the Year 2001, until his election as Member of Parliament. He was a governor of Handford Hall Primary School, Ipswich.

== Parliamentary career ==
In the 2001 parliament, Mole served as a member of the Select Committee that scrutinised the work of the Office of the Deputy Prime Minister, the Deregulation and Regulatory Affairs Select Committee and the Joint Committee on Statutory Instruments. He steered his Private Member's Bill onto the Statute Book where it became the Legal Deposit Libraries Act 2003, extending the concept of legal deposit to electronic records; the Bill was strongly promoted by the British Library

Mole was appointed in June 2005 to the position of Parliamentary Private Secretary PPS to the Local Government Minister Phil Woolas. He resigned from this position on 6 September 2006 after signing a letter calling on Prime Minister Tony Blair to step down. When Gordon Brown became Prime Minister, Mole was recalled to a PPS position, taking the post of PPS to John Healey, the Minister of State for the Department for Communities and Local Government on 28 June 2007. From 16 January 2007 until 20 August 2008, Mole was a member of the Science and Technology Committee.

In October 2008 he was made an Assistant Whip in the Labour government and acted as Assistant Regional Minister with Barbara Follett, the Regional Minister for the East of England. He became a minister for the first time in the June 2009 reshuffle when he was appointed to the Department for Transport as a Parliamentary Under Secretary of State.

In November 2008, he wrote a "strongly worded" letter to BBC Director-General Mark Thompson, demanding that Top Gear presenter Jeremy Clarkson be sacked when he joked about lorry drivers murdering prostitutes.

== Personal life ==
He lives in East Ipswich with his wife Shona (née Gibb), a systems analyst for BT in Ipswich, and their two sons Edward (born 1991) and Thomas (born 1994).

Since leaving the House of Commons in 2010, Chris has volunteered at the Ipswich and Suffolk Credit Union, becoming their general manager in June 2011.

Parliament of the United Kingdom
Preceded by Jamie Cann	Member of Parliament for Ipswich; 2001–2010	Succeeded by Ben Gummer
