= List of MPs for constituencies in Northern Ireland (2001–2005) =

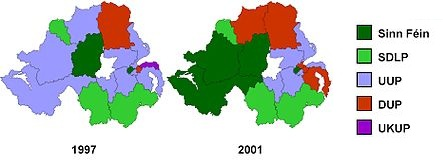
- Colours on map indicate the party allegiance of each constituency's MP.

This is a list of members of Parliament (MPs) elected to the House of Commons of the United Kingdom by Northern Irish constituencies for the 53rd Parliament of the United Kingdom (2001 to 2005). There are 18 such constituencies, 11 of which were represented by Unionists and seven by Nationalists. It includes MPs elected at the 2001 United Kingdom general election, held on 7 June 2001.

The list is sorted by the name of the MP.

Sinn Féin MPs follow an abstentionist policy of not taking their seats in the House of Commons.

== Composition ==
Affiliation	Members
DUP	5
Sinn Féin	4
SDLP	3
Ulster Unionist	6
Total	18

== MPs ==
MP	Constituency	Party	In constituency since	First elected
Gerry Adams	Belfast West	Sinn Féin	1997	1983
Gregory Campbell	East Londonderry	DUP	2001	2001
Nigel Dodds	Belfast North	DUP	2001	2001
Pat Doherty	West Tyrone	Sinn Féin	2001	2001
Jeffrey Donaldson	Lagan Valley	Ulster Unionist	1997	1997
John Hume	Foyle	SDLP	1983	1983
Michelle Gildernew	Fermanagh and South Tyrone	Sinn Féin	2001	2001
Sylvia, Lady Hermon	North Down	Ulster Unionist	2001	2001
David Burnside	South Antrim	Ulster Unionist	2001	2001
Martin Smyth	Belfast South	Ulster Unionist	1982	1982
Eddie McGrady	South Down	SDLP	1987	1987
Martin McGuinness	Mid Ulster	Sinn Féin	1997	1997
Seamus Mallon	Newry and Armagh	SDLP	1986	1986
Ian Paisley	North Antrim	DUP	1970	1970
Iris Robinson	Strangford	DUP	2001	2001
Peter Robinson	Belfast East	DUP	1979	1979
David Trimble	Upper Bann	Ulster Unionist	1990	1990
Roy Beggs	East Antrim	Ulster Unionist	1983	1983
