= Clydesdale (UK Parliament constituency) =

UK Parliament constituency (1983–2005)

- Former county constituency for the House of Commons
- Boundary of Clydesdale in Scotland for the 2001 general election

1983–2005
- Seats: One
- Created from: Lanark and Hamilton
- Replaced by: Dumfriesshire, Clydesdale and Tweeddale; Lanark and Hamilton East; East Kilbride, Strathaven and Lesmahagow

Clydesdale was a county constituency represented in the House of Commons of the Parliament of the United Kingdom from 1983 until 2005. In the latter year, as part of a major reorganisation of Scottish constituencies, it was redistributed to Dumfriesshire, Clydesdale and Tweeddale, Lanark and Hamilton East and East Kilbride, Strathaven and Lesmahagow.

The similarly named Scottish Parliament constituency of Clydesdale continues in existence.

== Boundaries ==
Clydesdale District, and the Hamilton District electoral division of Larkhall and Stonehouse.

== Members of Parliament ==
Election	Member	Party
1983	Judith Hart	Labour
1987	Jimmy Hood	Labour
2005	constituency abolished	

== Elections ==
=== Elections of the 1980s ===
General election 1983: Clydesdale
Party	Candidate	Votes	%	±%
Labour	Judith Hart	17,873	38.8	−8.2
Conservative	Peter Bainbridge	13,007	28.2	+1.7
SDP	Moira Craig	9,908	21.5	+14.5
SNP	Tom McAlpine	5,271	11.4	−8.1
Majority		4,866	10.6	−9.5
Turnout		46,059	76.5	
Labour win (new seat)				

General election 1987: Clydesdale
Party	Candidate	Votes	%	±%
Labour	Jimmy Hood	21,826	45.3	+6.5
Conservative	Raymond Robertson	11,324	23.5	−4.7
SDP	John Boyle	7,909	16.4	−5.1
SNP	Michael Russell	7,125	14.8	+3.4
Majority		10,502	21.8	+11.2
Turnout		48,186	78.2	+1.7
Labour hold		Swing		

=== Elections of the 1990s ===
General election 1992: Clydesdale
Party	Candidate	Votes	%	±%
Labour	Jimmy Hood	21,418	44.6	−0.7
Conservative	Carol Goodwin	11,231	23.4	−0.1
SNP	Iain Gray	11,084	23.1	+8.3
Liberal Democrats	Elspeth M. Buchanan	3,957	8.2	−8.2
BNP	Stephen Cartwright	342	0.7	New
Majority		10,187	21.2	−0.6
Turnout		48,029	77.6	−0.6
Labour hold		Swing		

General election 1997: Clydesdale
Party	Candidate	Votes	%	±%
Labour	Jimmy Hood	23,859	52.5	+7.9
SNP	Andrew Doig	10,050	22.1	−1.0
Conservative	Mark Izatt	7,396	16.3	−7.1
Liberal Democrats	Sandra Grieve	3,796	8.4	+0.2
BNP	Kenneth Smith	311	0.7	0.0
Majority		13,809	30.4	+9.2
Turnout		45,412	71.6	−6.0
Labour hold		Swing		

=== Elections of the 2000s ===
General election 2001: Clydesdale
Party	Candidate	Votes	%	±%
Labour	Jimmy Hood	17,822	46.6	−5.9
SNP	Jim Wright	10,028	26.2	+4.1
Conservative	Kevin Newton	5,034	13.2	−3.1
Liberal Democrats	Moira Craig	4,111	10.8	+2.4
Scottish Socialist	Paul Cockshott	974	2.5	New
UKIP	Donald Mackay	253	0.7	New
Majority		7,794	20.4	−10.0
Turnout		38,222	59.3	−12.3
Labour hold		Swing		
