= Jamie Cann =

British politician

Jamie Cann MP

Member of Parliament for Ipswich
- In office 9 April 1992 – 15 October 2001
- Preceded by: Michael Irvine
- Succeeded by: Chris Mole

Personal details
- Born: 28 June 1946 Barton-upon-Humber, Lincolnshire, England
- Died: 15 October 2001 (aged 55) Cambridge, England
- Party: Labour
- Spouse: Rosemary Lovitt (m. 1970)
- Children: 2

Jamie Charles Cann (28 June 1946 – 15 October 2001) was a British Labour Party politician who was the Leader of Ipswich Borough Council from 1979 to 1991, before being elected as the Member of Parliament (MP) for Ipswich at the 1992 general election, a seat he held until his death in 2001.

== Early and family life ==
He was educated at Barton-upon-Humber Grammar School and Kesteven College of Education. He then became a primary school teacher, serving as deputy headmaster of Handford Hall Primary School in Ipswich from 1981 to 1992.

== Political career ==
Cann voted against equalising the age of consent for same-sex relations. In 1998, he was fined £1,000, and disqualified from driving for eighteen months for drink driving.

Described by The Guardian as 'sardonic', he spent most of his time campaigning in the constituency. As leader of Ipswich Borough Council, he was noted as a reformer and helped make Ipswich a model local authority.

He died of liver disease, in October 2001, just four months after being re-elected at the 2001 general election, and following a spell in hospital in Cambridge. The subsequent by-election for Ipswich was held on 22 November and was retained for the Labour Party by the new candidate Chris Mole. A retirement home on the Ravenswood development in Ipswich was named in Cann's honour following his death.

Parliament of the United Kingdom
Preceded by Michael Irvine	Member of Parliament for Ipswich; 1992–2001	Succeeded by Chris Mole
