= Jimmy Hood =

British politician

James Hood
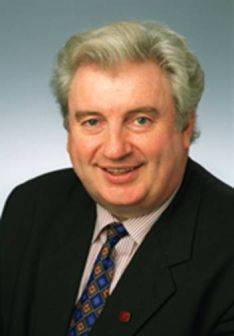

Chair of the European Scrutiny Committee
- In office 17 November 1998 – 18 October 2006
- Preceded by: Committee established
- Succeeded by: Michael Connarty

Member of Parliament for Lanark and Hamilton East Clydesdale (1987–2005)
- In office 11 June 1987 – 30 March 2015
- Preceded by: Judith Hart
- Succeeded by: Angela Crawley

Personal details
- Born: 16 May 1948 Lesmahagow, Lanarkshire, Scotland
- Died: 3 December 2017 (aged 69)
- Party: Labour
- Spouse: Marion McCleary
- Education: University of Nottingham

James Hood (16 May 1948 – 3 December 2017) was a Scottish Labour Party politician, who served as a Member of Parliament from 1987 until being defeated in 2015. He represented the Clydesdale constituency until 2005, and the Lanark and Hamilton East constituency thereafter. Hood, a National Union of Mineworkers (NUM) trade union official during the miners' strike of 1984–85, remained a backbencher throughout his parliamentary career.

== Early life ==
James Hood was born in Lesmahagow, Lanarkshire and was educated at the Lesmahagow Higher Grade School in Lesmahagow, Coatbridge College, Motherwell Technical College and the University of Nottingham.

He worked with the National Coal Board (NCB) for 23 years, as a mining engineer from 1964, the year he joined the NUM until 1987. He started his career with the NCB in the Lanarkshire Coalfield, at Auchlochan Colliery, moving to Nottinghamshire on the closure of the coalfield in the summer of 1968 and became a NUM trade union official in 1973. During the miners' strike of 1984–85 he led the striking Nottinghamshire miners.

From 1973 to 1987 he was a member of Ollerton Parish Council. In 1979 he was elected as a councillor to Newark and Sherwood District Council and served until his election to Westminster.

== Parliamentary career ==
He was elected to the House of Commons as the Member of Parliament for Clydesdale at the 1987 general election, following the retirement of the sitting Labour MP Judith Hart. Hood won the seat with a majority of 10,502 votes. His Clydesdale-based seat was abolished as part of boundary changes directly before the 2005 general election. Hood then stood for the newly created seat and was elected as MP for Lanark and Hamilton East. He represented the seat until his defeat at the 2015 general election to the Scottish National Party candidate, Angela Crawley.

In Parliament, he joined the left-wing Campaign group and initially refused to pay the poll tax. In 1998, he called for the abolition of the system of parliamentary whips in a debate on workplace bullying, arguing that workplace abuses existed in Parliament "where careers are controlled by the carrot and stick of political patronage" and suggesting that "career assassination" was commonplace. Despite his credentials as a left-wing firebrand, he subsequently came to be regarded as a relatively loyal supporter of Tony Blair's 'New Labour'.

He voted against the first Gulf War, and was one of many Labour rebels that voted against the invasion of Iraq in 2003.

In Parliament, he served as the Chairman of the European legislation select committee from 1992 to 2006, having been a member from 1987. He was also member of the Liaison Committee from 1992 to 2006 and on the Defence Select Committee between 1997 and 2001. He was a Member of the Speaker's panel of Chairmen from 1997.

In November 2008, Hood was one of 18 MPs who signed a Commons motion backing a Team GB football team at the 2012 Olympic Games, saying football "should not be any different from other competing sports and our young talent should be allowed to show their skills on the world stage". The football governing bodies of Scotland, Wales and Northern Ireland are all opposed to a Great Britain team, fearing it would stop them competing as individual nations in future tournaments.

In February 2014, Hood outlined his opposition to Scottish independence in a commons debate, stating "Even if the SNP was right and there was a grand, great thing at the end of the rainbow for the SNP and its debate for independence, I would still be against it. If the Scottish people are going to be better off economically and so on, I would still be against breaking away from the Union".

In October 2014, Hood invoked parliamentary privilege to link former Home Secretary Leon Brittan to accusations of improper conduct with children. He added that "I am just repeating what I read in the papers".

On 7 May 2015, Hood was unseated by the Scottish National Party candidate Angela Crawley, a South Lanarkshire Council councillor. Crawley overturned Hood's previous majority of 13,478 votes to command a 10,100 majority for the SNP.

=== Expenses ===
During the MPs expenses scandal, it was reported that Hood had claimed £1,000 per month in second home expenses without claiming receipts, which was up to the permissible limits in place at the time. Hood said his second London home was necessary because of the distance of Westminster from Lanarkshire, and he accepted it would not be possible to make claims of that size in future without receipts and he "fully supported" putting details of expenses online.

== Personal life ==
He married Marion McCleary in 1967; the couple had a son and a daughter and five grandchildren. He suffered a heart attack in 1998. Hood died of a second heart attack on 3 December 2017, aged 69.

Parliament of the United Kingdom
Preceded by Judith Hart	Member of Parliament for Clydesdale; 1987 – 2005	Constituency abolished
New constituency	Member of Parliament for Lanark and Hamilton East; 2005 – 2015	Succeeded by Angela Crawley
