= Colin Brown =

Colin Brown may refer to:

- Colin Brown (cricketer) (1878–1936), Somerset cricketer
- Colin Brown (RAF officer) (1898–1965), World War I flying ace with 14 victories
- Colin Brown (jockey) (born 1955), English National Hunt jockey active in the 1980s
- Colin Brown (film journalist) (born 1962), British editor-in-chief of Screen International
- Colin Brown (political journalist) (1950–2020), British political journalist
- Colin Brown (American football) (born 1985), offensive lineman for the Buffalo Bills
- Colin Brown (artist) (born 1962), Scottish artist

== See also ==
- Colin Browne (disambiguation)
