= Colin Browne =

Colin Browne may refer to:

- Colin Browne (filmmaker), Canadian writer, documentary filmmaker and academic
- Colin Browne (businessman), American chief executive of Under Armour
- Colin O'Neil Browne, politician from Antigua and Barbuda

== See also ==
- Colin Brown (disambiguation)
