= Prescott punch =

British political controversy in 2001

Coordinates: 53°19′05.2″N 3°29′07.9″W

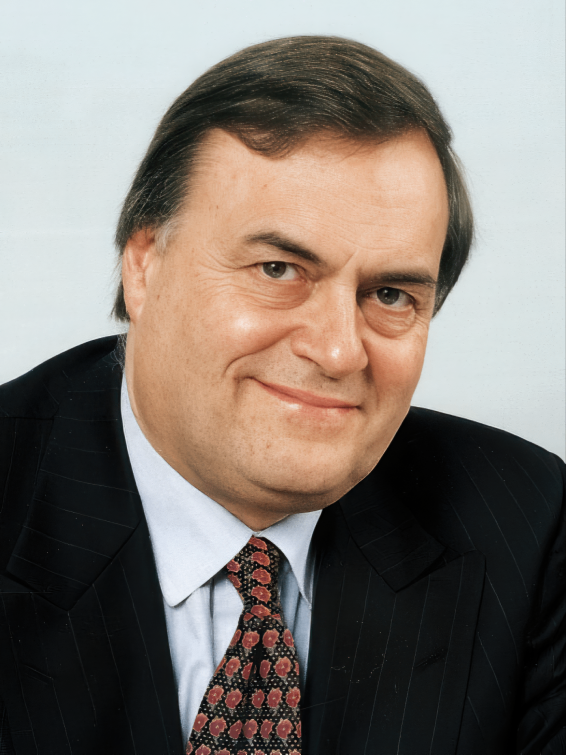
Prescott in 1997

In the evening of 16 May 2001, John Prescott, the British deputy prime minister, was hit in the face by an egg while walking to a Labour Party election rally at the Little Theatre in Rhyl, North Wales, in the run-up to the 2001 general election. Prescott hit the protester who had thrown the egg, agricultural worker Craig Evans, with a left-handed jab. A brief scuffle ensued, during which Prescott was pushed into a wall before police and Labour Party supporters moved Evans away. The incident came on the same day that the Labour Party's election manifesto had been launched. Earlier in the day Prime Minister Tony Blair had been confronted by an angry relative of a patient in a Birmingham hospital, and Home Secretary Jack Straw had been jeered at a conference of the Police Federation of England and Wales.

Labour's senior leadership were divided on how to respond to the incident, which Prescott characterised as an act of self defence. Alastair Campbell, Downing Street Director of Communications, told Prescott to apologise but he refused. Sky News broke the first news of the incident and were threatened with a libel suit by Labour. The Chancellor of the Exchequer and Labour's election campaign leader Gordon Brown stood by Prescott, though Blair thought an apology should have been made.

The story led most newspapers on 17 May and coverage was generally not negative. Blair referred to the incident in a cautious manner at that morning's press conference but it became clear that the press were treating it as a humorous occurrence. Polls found that the public were supportive of Prescott's response to being egged at close range and it did not affect Labour's poll standing. Labour won the election, with a slightly reduced but still very large majority.

== Background ==
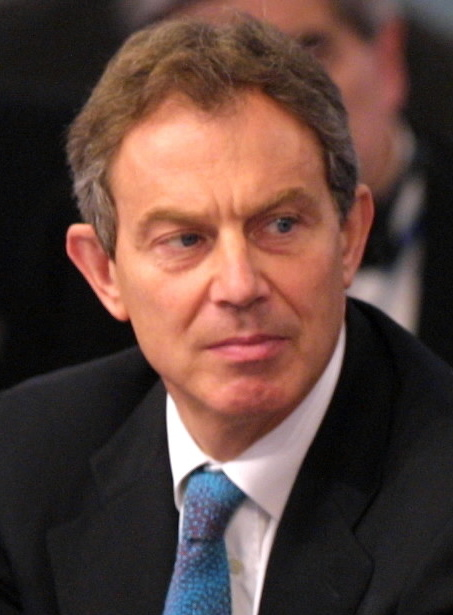
Tony Blair, pictured in 2002

The 2001 general election took place on 7 June 2001; it was the first election following the landslide victory of the Labour Party, under Tony Blair, at the general election of 1997. Labour's Chancellor of the Exchequer, Gordon Brown, had taken charge of the Labour Party campaign, including development of the manifesto for the 2001 campaign. The result of the election was seen as a foregone conclusion with Labour widely expected to retain their significant majority in the House of Commons. There was low turnover in members of parliament and, Labour having dropped all-women shortlists, there was expected to be little change to the demographic make-up of the house (unlike 1997 which had seen a significant increase in the number of women elected).

Campaigning by all parties was low-key and Clarke et al. (2018) state that Labour's campaign was perceived to be dull and "overly stage-managed". In 2002 political scientist Anthony King described the campaign as "one of the dullest in recent history".

== Day of the incident ==
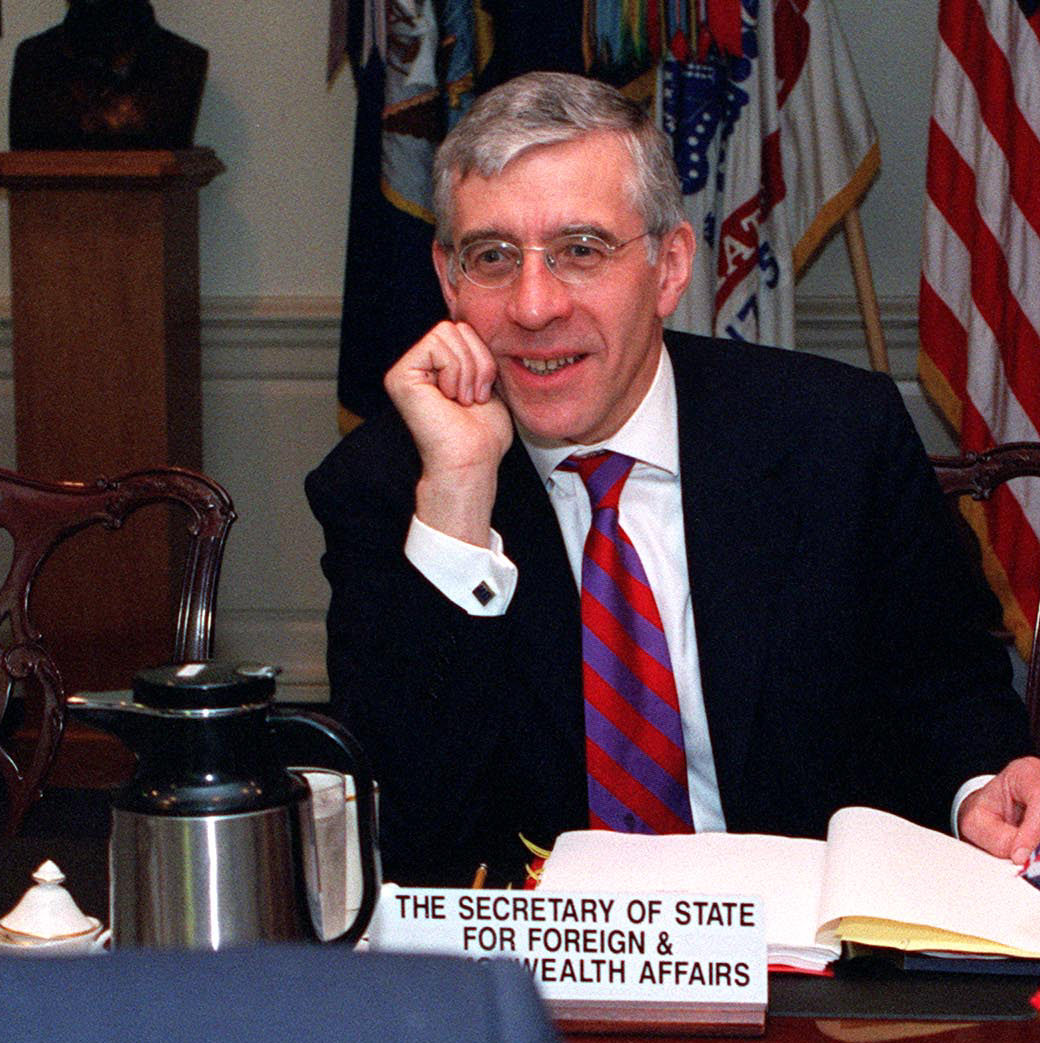
Jack Straw, pictured later in 2001

On the day of the incident, 16 May 2001, Labour had launched their manifesto at an event in Birmingham. Prescott, with other senior party figures, had travelled to the event aboard a chartered train from London. Cabinet ministers afterwards travelled to the regions to launch the manifesto locally. Blair went to Queen Elizabeth Hospital Birmingham where he was confronted by Sharron Storer, the partner of a cancer patient who was angry with the level of treatment he was receiving from the National Health Service (NHS). Improvements to the NHS had been a key objective in Labour's 1997 manifesto. The home secretary, Jack Straw, travelled to Blackpool to address a conference of the Police Federation of England and Wales on the law and order pledges in the 2001 manifesto. Straw was jeered at the conference and laughed at when he said that being a police officer was a "good job". During the same day William Hague, leader of the rival Conservative Party, was forced to abandon a planned walkabout in Wolverhampton on security advice, due to a rowdy demonstration.

Prescott, unaware of the Blair and Straw incidents, travelled to Rhyl, North Wales, where he was to address a Labour Party election rally at the town's Little Theatre. His campaign bus, the Prescott Express, arrived outside the theatre at 6:35 pm. The bus parked opposite the theatre and Prescott and his team had to cross the A525 Vale Road to reach the venue. Prescott crossed at a pedestrian crossing onto the opposite footpath which ran between a pedestrian guard rail and a low wall.

Some 30 protesters picketed the venue, demonstrating against low agricultural wages and Labour's support for a fox hunting ban. A Sky News crew, tipped off that there would be a protest, filmed Prescott's arrival, as did a BBC News camera. An egg was thrown at Prescott as he approached the protesters but it missed. Some of the protesters occupied the space between the guard rail and the wall and were not moved on by the two police officers that preceded Prescott's team. As Prescott reached the footpath he had no direct police guard; his closest support was his special adviser Joan Hammell, Labour Party official Jessica Morden and assistant Beverley Priest. His main escort Martin Angus, had drifted out in front in a hurry to get into the venue.

External videos
- Video of the punch
- The Prescott Punch - Rhyl, 2001 on YouTube

As Prescott passed protester Craig Evans, a local farm worker, Evans threw an egg at Prescott at point-blank range. The egg hit Prescott in the side of the face and dripped down his neck, which Prescott initially thought was his own blood. Prescott reacted with what The Independent's political journalist Colin Brown described as "an instinctive boxer's jab with the left fist" at Evans. There followed a scuffle between the two men and other parties, which the BBC described as an "undignified brawl". Prescott was pushed onto the low wall and was nearly toppled over before the police and his supporters intervened and broke up the fight.

Following the incident Evans was moved away by the police and Prescott walked into the venue, with the BBC describing him as appearing to be "clearly shaken" by the events. In his 2008 memoir, Prezza: My Story: Pulling No Punches, Prescott recalls wondering at this point whether the incident would make the newspapers at all. He was also concerned that the video footage would not show the height advantage Evans had over him and that the reporting would portray Prescott as a "sixteen-stone bruiser". During the rally a convoy of vehicles drove past the theatre, honking their horns in support of the protest. The convoy was led by Brynle Williams, a leader of the 2000 fuel protests.

== Aftermath ==
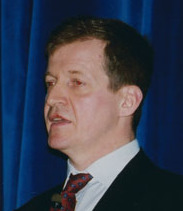
Campbell, pictured in 2003

Shortly after the incident Prescott made a statement that described the events as a "frightening and regrettable incident" amid a "clearly hostile" crowd. The statement ended: "I was attacked by an individual. In the mêlée that followed I clearly defended myself. I believe that someone is now being questioned by the police and it would be quite improper and quite wrong to add any further comment". Clive Wolfendale, an assistant chief constable of North Wales Police said "clearly if there are any allegations made against [Prescott] as a result of these incidents, we will investigate. If that means questioning Mr Prescott, we will do that". In the event neither Evans nor Prescott were charged with any criminal offence.

Following the incident Prescott first made contact with Alastair Campbell, the Downing Street Director of Communications. Campbell was with Blair, who was filming an election segment for ITV News. Campbell recalled in his memoirs that there was initially silence on the line which he recognised as a sign that Prescott had a problem to relay. Campbell immediately told Prescott that he should apologise though Prescott retorted that Campbell had not when he punched Guardian political editor Michael White in the House of Commons in 1991. Campbell was then political editor of the Daily Mirror, and White had made a joke about Mirror owner Robert Maxwell who had recently died at sea. No apology was made by Prescott. Campbell informed Blair once filming had finished and they travelled from the studio in the company of PR adviser Anji Hunter who worried that "middle-class England will not understand" the reason why Prescott punched Evans.

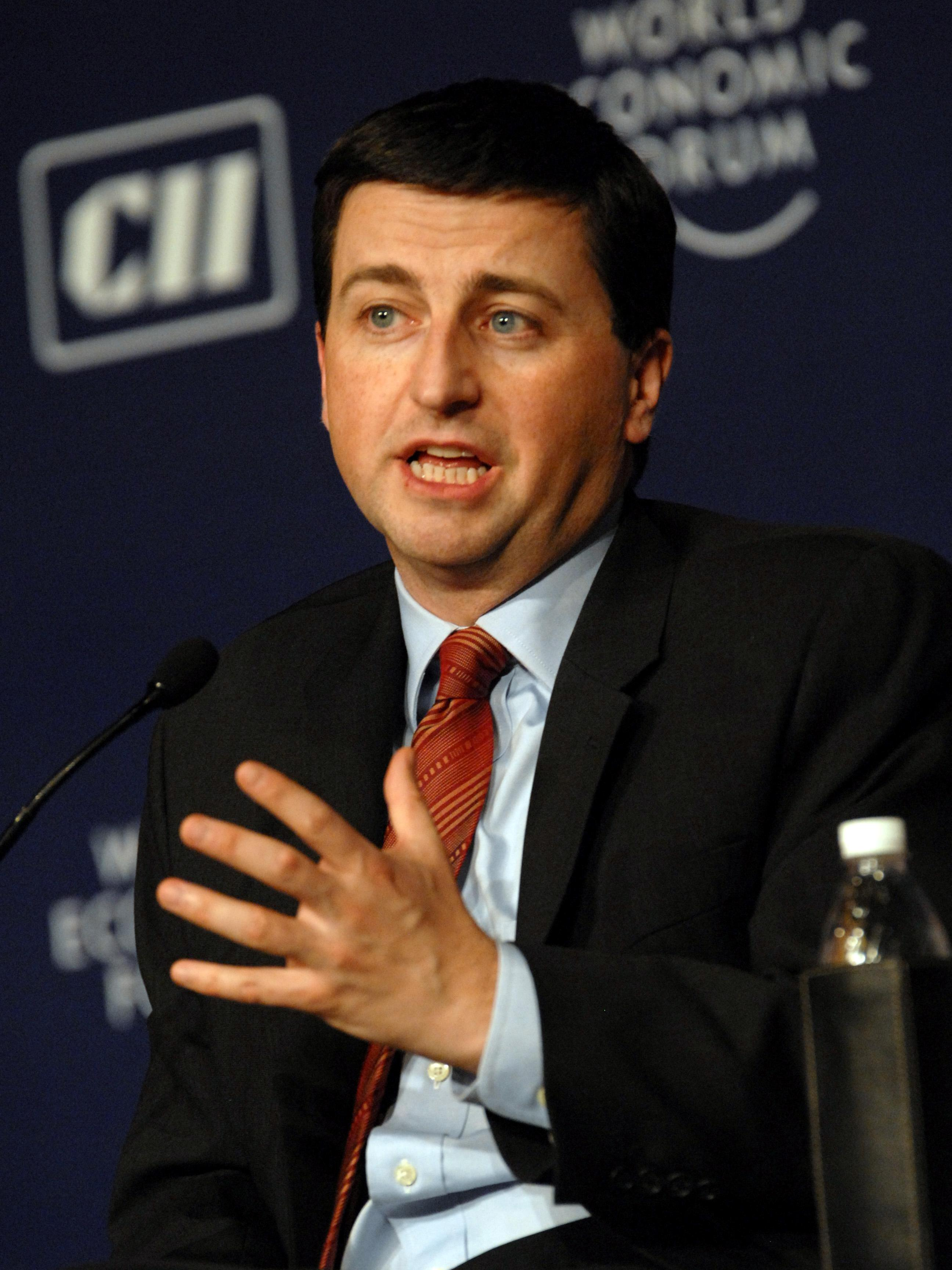
Douglas Alexander, pictured in 2008

At the time of the punch Brown was at the Labour Party headquarters at Millbank Tower in London. He was meeting with senior advisers including Douglas Alexander, Ian Austin, Lord Falconer, Lance Price, Philip Gould, key seats head Peter Hambly, polling head Greg Cook and Labour General Secretary Margaret McDonagh to discuss the next day's press conference. During the meeting McDonagh was informed of the punch by a Labour official. At the end of the meeting she announced that "there has been an incident in Rhyl. We don't know the details but we think that John Prescott may have punched someone". It proved difficult for Brown's team to contact Prescott to get more details as the mobile phone signal was patchy in Rhyl.

The news was broken by Shirley Lewis, Sky News' north-west correspondent, though initially without video of the punch itself. There was some panic at Millbank and an official called Sky News to threaten a libel suit over the reporting. It was the opinion of the Sky News team that Labour would have denied the incident had occurred if it had not been caught on camera. The Sky News footage was broadcast on their network and sold to other organisations, playing on the news that evening and the following morning. Once the footage appeared the libel threat was dropped. Brown stood by Prescott and ordered a statement prepared saying that the punch had been made in self defence. Price, in charge of the party's media strategy, refused to brief the statement before the footage had been viewed. Gould thought the incident would be viewed negatively by the public and affect Labour's poll performance. Some in the senior leadership team considered that Prescott would have to resign as the party, whose manifesto pledged to deal with yobbish behaviour, would be viewed as hypocritical.

The BBC News footage was later to appear but played a key part in helping the party leadership come to a decision on their response. The BBC camera showed the incident from the front (Sky's camera had been shooting over Prescott's shoulder) and showed the egg being thrown at point blank range and a punch from Evans hitting Prescott's face during the scuffle. Falconer and Alexander, former lawyers with experience in assault cases, stated that there was a good case to be made for Prescott acting in self defence. After this Price released the prepared statement. Blair thought this to be a wrong decision and was of the opinion that Prescott should have issued a full apology, others, including Joe Irvin, Prescott's representative at Millbank, were of the opinion that such an apology would be an admission of guilt.

== Impact on campaigning ==
The story led in most newspapers on 17 May 2001, relegating the Labour manifesto launch to the inside pages, with most of the coverage not negative in nature. This was a relief to Straw, who feared his reception at Blackpool would lead the news of the day but found it was eclipsed by the Rhyl and Birmingham hospital incidents. The Daily Mirror went with a single word headline "Manifisto", while The Sun christened Prescott "Two Jabs", an allusion to his nickname of "Two Jags", after his penchant for expensive official cars. The incident was referred to as the Prescott punch, Prescott's punch or the "Rumble in Rhyl".

That morning Blair was concerned about the questioning he would receive from the media in the pre-arranged press conference. Although at that morning's strategy meeting he confessed "I cannot talk about it without finding it funny". Campbell opined that "it will probably go down well with the D/Es" (meaning the working and non-working classes as identified on the NRS social grade). At the press conference Blair read a carefully worded statement saying that "in respect of John, of course it would have been better if the whole thing hadn't happened, but I want to say something to you about John Prescott. You could not wish for a deputy more loyal, more true and more decent. He cares about his country and he cares passionately about his politics. But John is John..." At the last line the audience of reporters laughed. Blair quickly realised that the incident would be treated lightly and in good humour. Despite this there remained a split in the opinion at Millbank, many younger female staff were appalled by the lack of punishment for Prescott. While Brown's team remained supportive some within Blair's team thought that Prescott should still have resigned.

There continued to be little in the way of negative coverage of the punch in the media. The increased coverage of the punch gave Labour a marginal advantage over the Conservatives in the quantity of coverage broadcast in the run-up to the election. When the punch coverage is removed from the data the share of coverage is approximately even. An observer for Mass-Observation noted that the news story was one of the few election-related stories to be reported in the United States. Opinion polls showed the public, particularly the working class, supported Prescott's reaction to the egg throw; a Sky News Active television poll of 38,000 people found 61% in support. In the 7 June general election Labour maintained a significant majority of 166 seats, down slightly from 179 in 1997. They saw their vote share fall marginally from 43.2% to 40.7% while the Conservatives saw a slight increase from 30.7% to 31.7%.

Although Brown considered that the incident could have ended Prescott's political career it seems to have done no harm, though it has been described by Clarke et al. as a gaffe. Later works have described the incident as bringing some light relief to the campaign, without harming the prospects of Labour in the election. It, and the Birmingham hospital incident, have been regarded as the only two memorable moments of the entire campaign. The Times Guide to the House of Commons has called the incident "one of the ugliest, and in many ways, the most humorous, scuffles of modern electoral history". For a while the "Prescott Wave", a clenched left fist salute, became popular and Prescott was greeted with it at many of his later campaign appearances. A number of internet sites inspired by the punch were established. They offered the chance for the user to virtually punch a number of politicians or to have them punch others.

Prescott considered the incident had been set-up by the Countryside Alliance as part of their protest against the proposed abolition of fox hunting. Prescott had clashed with the movement before and at the 2000 Labour Party conference had said "every time I see the Countryside Alliance and their contorted faces, I vow to redouble my efforts to abolish fox-hunting". Prescott's friend, former union leader Rodney Bickerstaffe, claimed the incident showed Prescott's age (he was then 62), saying "I told him it was a good left, but it had no weight. In the past, the lad would not have got up. He must be losing his touch".
