= Anne Marie Morris =

Former British politician

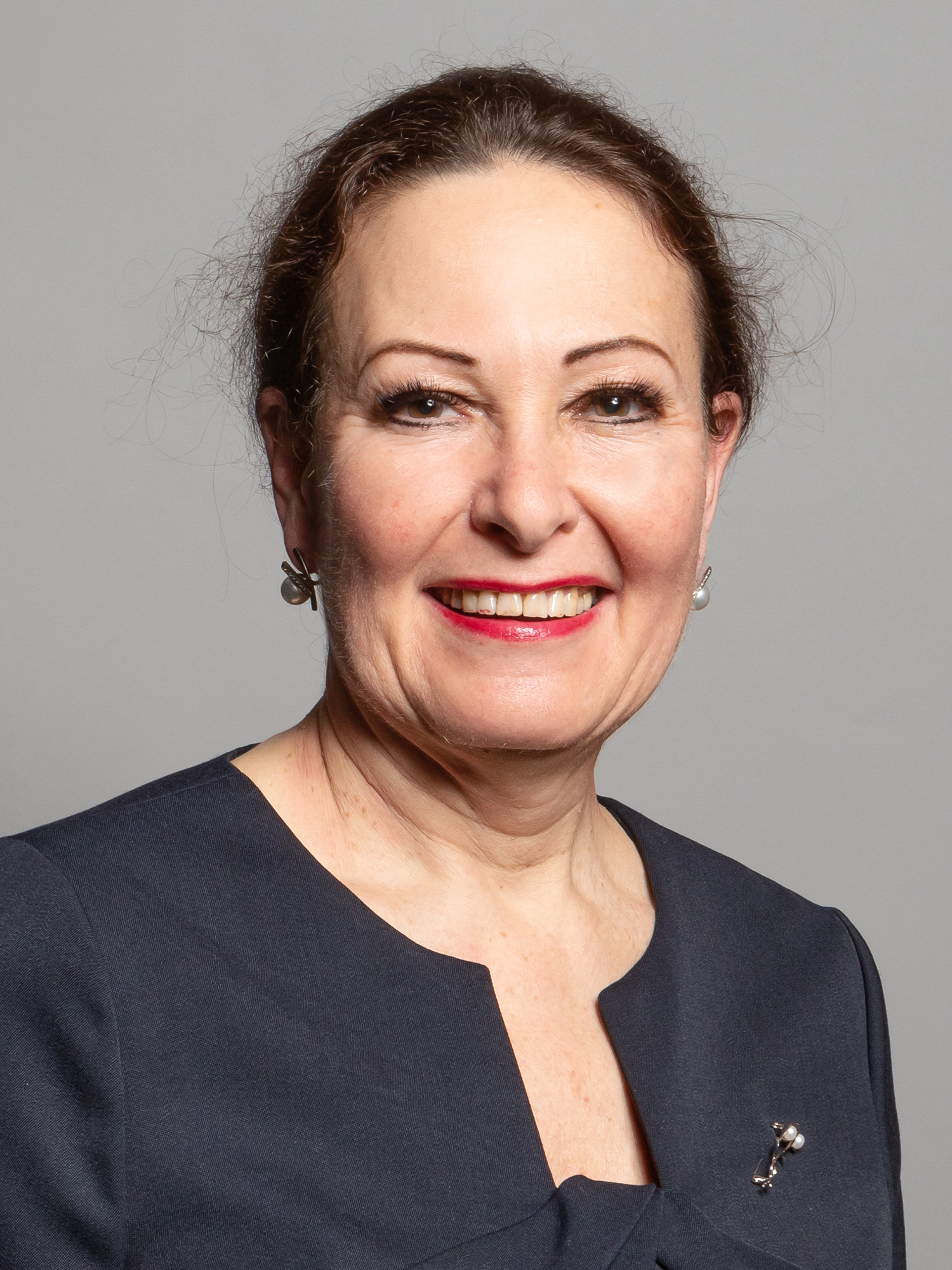
- Official portrait, 2020

Member of Parliament for Newton Abbot
- In office 6 May 2010 – 30 May 2024
- Preceded by: Richard Younger-Ross (Teignbridge)
- Succeeded by: Martin Wrigley

Personal details
- Born: 5 July 1957 (age 69) London, England
- Party: Reform UK (from 2025)
- Other political affiliations: Conservative (until 2025)
- Education: Hertford College, Oxford
- Occupation: Politician; lawyer
- Website: www.annemariemorris.co.uk

Anne Marie Morris (born 5 July 1957) is a British politician and lawyer, who represented Newton Abbot as a Member of Parliament (MP) between May 2010 and May 2024 as a Conservative Member. During her 14 year term in office, she twice lost the party whip for a period of nine months between July and December 2017, and then again between January and May 2022. Morris joined Reform UK to lead their social care policy in 2025.

== Early life and career ==
Anne Marie Morris was born on 5 July 1957 in London. Morris was privately educated at Bryanston School in Dorset, and then went to the University of Oxford, where she studied law at Hertford College.

After a career working as a corporate lawyer, Morris became a marketing director for PricewaterhouseCoopers (PwC) and Ernst and Young. She was elected as a councillor on West Sussex County Council for the division of Cuckfield & Lucastes in 2005 and went on to chair the council's Health Scrutiny Committee.

== Parliamentary career ==
In December 2006, Morris was selected by the local Conservative Association as the prospective parliamentary candidate for Newton Abbot. At the 2010 general election, she was elected to Parliament as MP for Newton Abbot with 43% of the vote and a majority of 523.

In March 2011, in Newton Abbot, Morris established Teignbridge Business Buddies, a scheme that offers support to small businesses.

Morris attracted attention during Prime Minister's Questions in July 2012 as she shouted a long question on technical colleges in Devon over a noisy and increasingly amused Commons chamber, whilst waving a left arm held in a sling. Video of her "high-pitched outburst" was widely circulated on social media. Morris said she cared about the issue raised and would "always speak passionately about issues in my constituency."

In October 2012, Morris was featured in an investigation by the BBC into MPs who owned property in London but claimed expenses for renting a separate property in the city. She was listed as one of 22 MPs who were undertaking the practice, which was legal, following a cap on the amount MPs could claim for mortgage costs.

In August 2013, Morris was one of 30 Conservative rebels whose votes helped defeat the government's plans for military action in Syria. She later said she made the decision because the military action plans "felt ill-thought through and smacked of regime change", but supported plans for air strikes against ISIL.

During 2014, Morris led the UK's first ever policy review to consider entrepreneurial education for all levels of education, 'An Education System for an Entrepreneur'.

At the 2015 general election, Morris was re-elected as MP for Newton Abbot with an increased vote share of 47.5% and an increased majority of 11,288.

Morris supported the United Kingdom leaving the European Union prior to the 2016 referendum.

At the snap 2017 general election, Morris was again re-elected with an increased vote share of 55.5% and an increased majority of 17,160.

On 15 November 2018, Morris submitted a letter of no confidence in Theresa May's leadership.

Morris was again re-elected at the 2019 general election, with the same vote share of 55.5% and an increased majority of 17,501.

In October 2020, Morris was one of five Conservative MPs who broke the whip to vote for a Labour opposition day motion to extend the provision of free school meals during school holidays until Easter 2021.

Regarding the December 2020 COVID-19 lockdown, Morris said: "There is nothing new in this document – it's just a rehash of data that has been published before. No attempt has been made to model the impact on the economy in the way that they have modelled the impact the tiers will have on Covid infections. I cannot support the Government in [the 1 December] vote, and everyone I know who has read the document is saying the same."

The Guardian reported in May 2022 that Morris had submitted a letter of no confidence in Prime Minister Boris Johnson. Morris supported Liz Truss in the July–September 2022 Conservative Party leadership election.

During May 2024, Morris was re-selected as the Conservative candidate for Newton Abbot at the 2024 general election. However, she was subsequently unseated by the Liberal Democrat, Martin Wrigley, when her vote share from the previous General Election declined sharply from 55.6% to just 27% following a turnout of 65.2%.

=== Whip suspensions ===
==== 2017 ====
In July 2017, Morris faced calls for the Conservative whip to be withdrawn from her after being recorded on a parliamentary panel using the idiom "nigger in the woodpile" to describe the threat of leaving the EU without a deal, at the launch of a report into the future for the UK's financial sector after Brexit. Morris later stated that the comment was "totally unintentional" and gave an unreserved apology. Prime Minister Theresa May had ordered the Chief Whip to suspend the party whip. The term had been used previously in the House of Lords by Conservative peer Lord Dixon-Smith in 2008.

This incident took place a few weeks after the 2017 general election campaign during which Morris distanced herself from a remark made by her partner and election agent, Roger Kendrick, at a hustings, in which he said problems in the British education system were "due entirely to non-British born immigrants and their high birth rates".

The whip was restored to Morris on 12 December 2017, one day before a crucial vote on the Brexit process. Although Morris voted with the Conservative government, the government was defeated by four votes.

==== 2022 ====
In January 2022, it was reported by Politico that she had again lost the Conservative whip, for voting for an opposition day motion on a VAT cut for energy bills. Morris said she was "disappointed", but "won't apologise for supporting measures that would help my hard-working constituents at a time when the cost of living is rising." The motion was defeated by 319 votes to 229. She said she had submitted a letter of no confidence in Boris Johnson before losing the whip. The party whip was restored on 12 May 2022.

== Post-parliamentary career ==
Following her defeat at the 2024 election, Morris has worked as a Managing Director at geopolitical advisory firm Manteion.

In July 2025, Morris joined Reform UK with the intention of developing their social care policies.

== Personal life ==
Morris lives in Newton Abbot and London. Her former partner was the financier Roger Kendrick, who also formerly served as her election agent.

Parliament of the United Kingdom
Preceded by Richard Younger-Ross as Member of Parliament for Teignbridge	Member of Parliament for Newton Abbot; 2010–2024	Succeeded by Martin Wrigley
