= Cuckfield & Lucastes (electoral division) =

Electoral division in West Sussex, England

Coordinates: 51.01591°N 0.14969°W

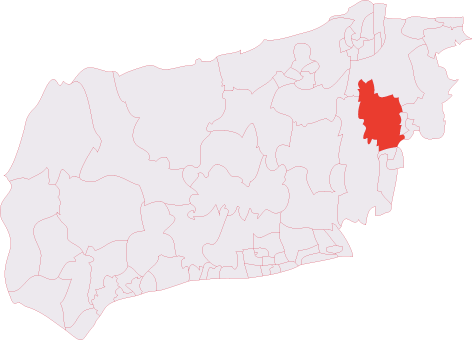
Cuckfield & Lucastes
Shown within West Sussex
District:	Mid Sussex
UK Parliament Constituency:	Mid Sussex, Horsham
Ceremonial county:	West Sussex
Electorate (2009):	8018
County Councillor
Peter Bradbury (Con)

Cuckfield & Lucastes is an electoral division of West Sussex in England, and returns one member to sit on West Sussex County Council.

== Extent ==
The division covers the town of Cuckfield and the western part of the town of Haywards Heath; and the villages of Ansty, Staplefield and Whitemans Green.

It comprises the Cuckfield and Haywards Heath Lucastes wards; the civil parishes of Ansty & Staplefield, Cuckfield; and the western part of Haywards Heath.

In March 2007, Anne Marie Morris resigned as councillor after she was selected as the Conservative candidate in the Devon seat of Newton Abbot for the 2010 United Kingdom general election.

== Election results ==
=== 2021 Election ===
Results of the election held on 6 May 2021:

Cuckfield & Lucastes
Party	Candidate	Votes	%	±%
Conservative	Pete Bradbury	1,740	46.1	−11.1
Liberal Democrats	Alison Rees	759	20.1	−4.7
Labour	Paul Kenny	586	15.5	+5.5
Green	Allan Murray	548	14.5	+6.5
Reform UK	Richard Rap	144	3.8	N/A
Majority				
Conservative hold		Swing		

=== 2017 Election ===
Results of the election held on 4 May 2017:

Cuckfield & Lucastes
Party	Candidate	Votes	%	±%
Conservative	Pete Bradbury	1,641	57.2	+8.6
Liberal Democrats	Stephen Blanch	711	24.8	+7.0
Labour	Sarah Moss	286	10.0	−1.4
Green	Catherine Edminson	229	8.0	+8.0
Majority		930	32.4	+6.0
Turnout		2,867	32.4	−0.6
Conservative hold		Swing		

=== 2013 Election ===
Results of the election held on 2 May 2013:

Cuckfield & Lucastes
Party	Candidate	Votes	%	±%
Conservative	Pete Bradbury	1,282	48.6	+1.8
UKIP	Marc Montgomery	585	22.2	+16.2
Liberal Democrats	Stephen Blanch	470	17.8	−3.4
Labour	Sarah Moss	300	11.4	+8.8
Majority		697	26.4	+0.8
Turnout		2,637	33.0	−12.4
Conservative hold		Swing	7.2% Con to UKIP	

=== 2009 Election ===
Results of the election held on 4 June 2009:

Cuckfield & Lucastes
Party	Candidate	Votes	%	±%
Conservative	Peter Bradbury	1,703	46.8	−14.5
Liberal Democrats	Stephen Blanch	770	21.2	−17.5
Independent	Mike Bright	644	17.7	N/A
UKIP	Marc Montgomery	218	6.0	N/A
Green	Catherine Edminson	208	5.7	N/A
Labour	Derek Davies	95	2.6	N/A
Majority		933	25.6	+3.0
Turnout		3,638	45.4	0.0
Conservative hold		Swing		

=== 2007 Bye-election ===
Results of the bye-election held on 3 May 2007:

Cuckfield & Lucastes
Party	Candidate	Votes	%	±%
Conservative	Peter Bradbury	2,020	61.3	+8.3
Liberal Democrats	Stephen Blanch	1,274	38.7	+7.4
Majority		746	22.6	+0.9
Turnout		3,358	45.4	−27.4
Conservative hold		Swing		

=== 2005 Election ===
Results of the election held on 5 May 2005:

Cuckfield & Lucastes
Party	Candidate	Votes	%	±%
Conservative	Anne Marie Morris	2,633	53.0	
Liberal Democrats	Irene Balls	1,556	31.3	
Labour	Derek Davies	423	8.5	
Green	Peter Wemyss-Gorman	354	7.1	
Majority		1,077	21.7	
Turnout		4,966	72.8	
Conservative win (new seat)				
