= Patrick Nicholls =

British politician (born 1948)

Member of Parliament for Teignbridge
- In office 9 June 1983 – 14 May 2001
- Preceded by: Constituency Established
- Succeeded by: Richard Younger-Ross

Personal details
- Born: 14 November 1948 (age 77)
- Party: Conservative

Patrick Charles Martyn Nicholls (born 14 November 1948) is a British solicitor and politician who served as a Conservative MP for Teignbridge between 1983 and 2001.

A solicitor by profession and formerly an East Devon District Councillor, Nicholls was first elected to the House of Commons in 1983 at the age of 34, winning a comfortable majority over the nationally known Liberal Party candidate, John Alderson, who had resigned as Chief Constable of Devon & Cornwall specifically to contest the seat.

Within a year of entering the House of Commons, Nicholls was made a parliamentary private secretary to the Home Office Minister David Mellor, and subsequently to the Minister of Agriculture John Gummer. He was also made a Steward of The British Boxing Board of Control.

Following the 1987 General Election, Nicholls entered the government as the Parliamentary Under Secretary of State for Employment. Still not yet 40, he was given a key role in piloting the second tranche of Conservative Trades Union reforms through Standing Committee. He was appointed to the Westminster Foundation for Democracy at its inception in 1992 and served on The North Atlantic Assembly and the 1922 Committee of Conservative MPs.

In 1994, he was made a Vice Chairman of the Conservative Party and in 1997 was appointed the Shadow Fisheries Minister by the then Leader of the Opposition, William Hague. A leading Eurosceptic, Nicholls was credited with having single-handedly turned Conservative Party policy around in favour of leaving the EU Common Fisheries Policy.

After losing his seat in 2001, Nicholls became Chairman of The Young Britons Foundation, a research think-tank established in July 2003 to "help train tomorrow's centre-right leaders and activists today". Currently, Nicholls is a freelance political journalist and lectures on British and American politics in Europe and America as well as the UK.

Nicholls is married with three children. His wife, Bridget, is also a solicitor.

== Writings ==
- Too Soon A Passing: a life of DCM Nicholls . Bellarion Books 2023. ISBN 9781527280120
- Leigh Rayment's Historical List of MPs

Parliament of the United Kingdom
New constituency	Member of Parliament for Teignbridge; 1983 – 2001	Succeeded by Richard Younger-Ross
