= Richard Younger-Ross =

British MP (born 1953)

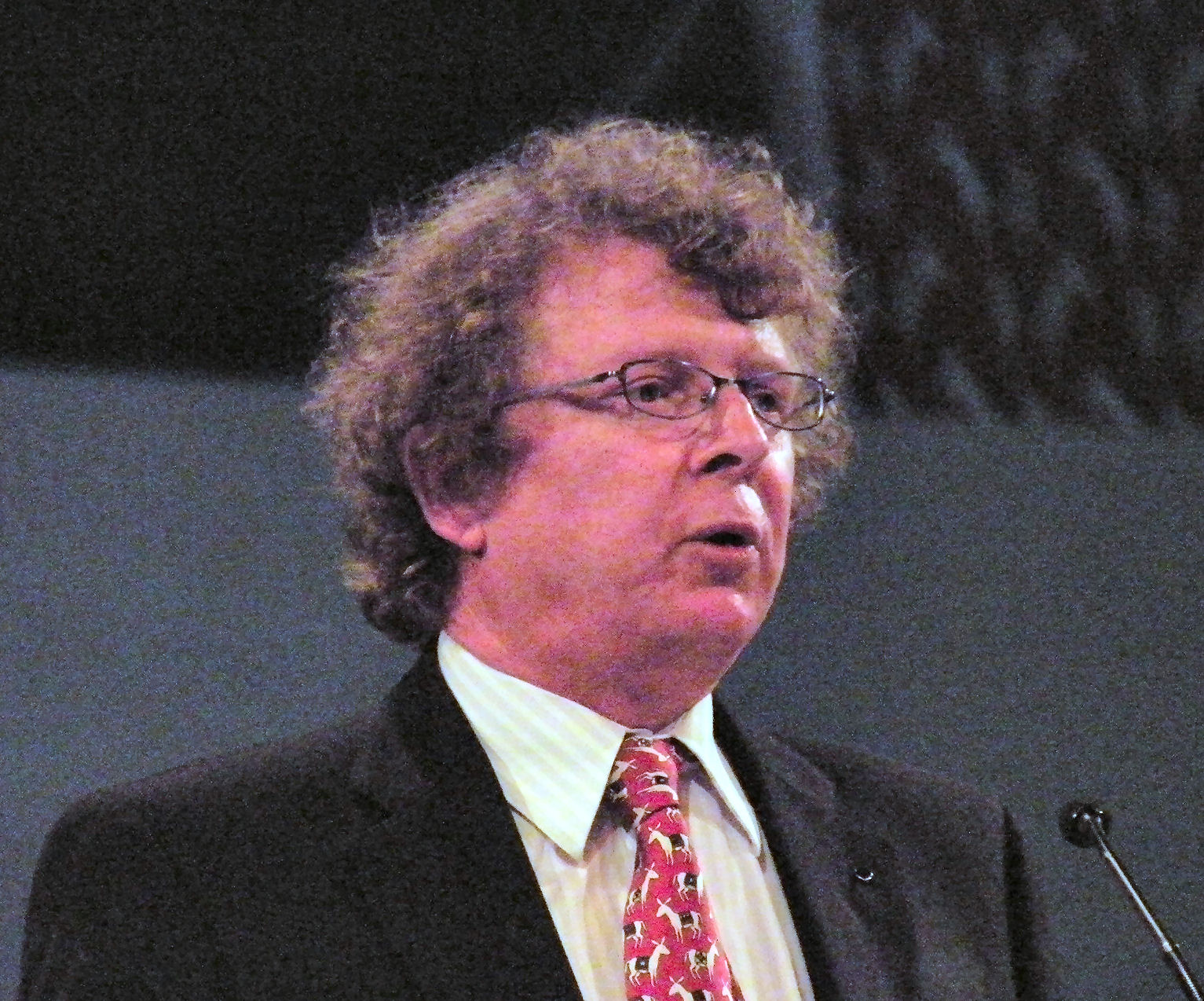

Member of Parliament for Teignbridge
- In office 7 June 2001 – 12 April 2010
- Preceded by: Patrick Nicholls
- Succeeded by: Constituency abolished

Personal details
- Born: 29 January 1953 (age 73) Surrey
- Party: Liberal Democrat
- Spouse: Susan Younger (married 1982)
- Education: Oxford Brookes University

Richard Alan Younger-Ross (born Richard Alan Ross, 29 January 1953) is a politician in England. He was the Liberal Democrat Member of Parliament (MP) for Teignbridge from 2001 to 2010, having contested the seat in 1992 and 1997, finally winning in the 2001 election. He was defeated in the redefined Newton Abbot constituency in 2010 election. In 2013 he fought and won the Devon County Council seat of Teignmouth Town, but four years later, on 4 May 2017, he lost his seat to Sylvia Russell, a Conservative, by just 22 votes.

== Early life ==
Richard Younger-Ross was born in Surrey in 1953. He attended Walton County Secondary School for Boys, Brooklands Technical College in Weybridge, then Ewell Technical College. He studied at Oxford Polytechnic, now Oxford Brookes University. Before becoming a politician, he was an architectural consultant.

His first, unsuccessful, candidacy for Parliament was at Chislehurst in 1987.

== Parliamentary career ==
He was a member of the Defence Select Committee and was the Lib Dem Spokesperson for Heritage.

In 2003, he voted against parliamentary approval for the invasion of Iraq.

He was a member of the Foreign Affairs Select Committee between 2005 and 2008.

In 2005, he proposed amendments to the Water Bill to create a water charge equalisation scheme to reduce the very high costs of water in the South West. This proposal is being considered by the Government following the Walker Report.

In 2006, Younger-Ross proposed a Ten Minute Rule Bill restricting Sunday trading hours in the UK for shops, arguing that without such legislation the British people would lose "rhythm of life" (House of Commons Debate, 24 May 2006). He is a member of the Beveridge Group.

In 2007, Younger-Ross was one of the last Liberal Democrat MPs to have the chance to question Tony Blair during Prime Minister's Questions. Rather than asking a topical or newsworthy question, Younger-Ross chose to ask an esoteric question about disestablishmentarianism, prompting the response from Blair, "I am really not bothered about that one." Also in 2007, he tabled an Early Day Motion calling for changes to the voting system of the Eurovision Song Contest, arguing that countries voted for their neighbours rather than the best songs. The UK finished second from the bottom in the 2007 contest, receiving votes only from Ireland and Malta.

In 2008 he proposed that Park Home Site owners should be "fit and proper people", a proposal currently being consulted on by the Government.

== Personal life ==
Younger-Ross moved to Teignmouth, Devon in 1989, with his wife, Susan Younger, whom he married in 1982 in Oxford. He is a Roman Catholic, attending a church in Teignmouth.

== Expenses ==
On 16 May 2009, The Daily Telegraph released details of several of Younger-Ross's parliamentary expense claims. The disclosures were part of the newspaper's wider disclosure of expenses of British Members of Parliament.

Younger-Ross was reported to have claimed more than £1200 for 5 mirrors to furnish his London flat, on which the rent was £1566 per month. A further £1475 was claimed for a single chest of drawers. These claims were submitted and approved by the Fees Office despite the fact that it was in excess of the so-called "John Lewis List". It was not issued to MPs but stated that MPs should not spend more than £500 on chests of drawers or more than £300 on a mirror. The Telegraph interpreted the claims as excessive, stating that they were "in clear breach of guidelines that state members must not use public funds" for "antique or luxury" goods. When questioned on Sky TV, he apologised saying that perceptions of what was luxury depended on your background and income, "clearly we have got it wrong".

On 21 March 2010, Younger-Ross was forced to apologise and pay £4,000 to Parliament after breaching commons rules over a payment he accepted relating to his second home. Younger-Ross had accepted £8,000 windfall money from the new landlord of his second home in Dolphin Square, London. In a letter to Sir Malcolm Rifkind, chairman of the Standards and Privileges Committee, Mr Younger-Ross said: "I wholly accept the report and its conclusions and unreservedly apologise." MPs had been told they could accept this payment by the fees office. Many MPs profited from using the allowance to assist them buying a home, the House of Commons considered this to be acceptable although they may profit by tens of thousands of pounds on the sale of the property.

Subsequent to this, the Telegraph reported that a number of MPs had secretly requested refunds of their initially repaid expense claims after demands received from the House of Commons were lower than expected. Mr Younger-Ross received the fourth largest refund, an amount of £3,170.92, thereby effectively negating the entirety of his initial payment.

== Hunting ==
Younger-Ross had a mixed voting record on hunting, rebelling against his party whips and voting against the fox hunting ban during the amendment stage of the bill and earlier abstaining on the key vote. He argued that although he disliked hunting, he would not vote for a ban which did not compensate those who had legitimately made a living from it. Two wrongs do not make a right he said.

== Penal Reform ==
Younger-Ross is a member of the Howard League for Penal Reform.

Parliament of the United Kingdom
Preceded by Patrick Nicholls	Member of Parliament for Teignbridge; 2001 – 2010	Succeeded by Anne Marie Morris as MP for Newton Abbot
