= Opinion polling for the 2001 United Kingdom general election =

Opinion polling for the 2001 United Kingdom general election was carried out by various organisations to gauge voting intention. The opinion polls listed range from the previous election on 1 May 1997 to the election on 7 June 2001.

All data is from Ipsos MORI, UK Polling Report and BBC News.

== Guide to tables ==
Poll results are listed in the tables below in reverse chronological order. The highest percentage figure in each poll is displayed in bold, and its background is shaded in the leading party's colour. The "lead" column shows the percentage point difference between the two parties with the highest figures. When a poll result is a tie, the figures with the highest percentages are shaded and displayed in bold.

== National poll results ==
=== 2001 ===
Date(s) conducted	Pollster	Client	Sample size	Lab	Con	LD	Others	Lead
7 Jun 2001	2001 general election		–	40.7%	31.7%	18.3%	9.3%	9.0
6 Jun	Gallup	The Daily Telegraph	2,399	47%	30%	18%	?	17
5–6 Jun	MORI	The Times	1,906	45%	30%	18%	?	15
2–4 Jun	ICM	The Guardian	1,009	43%	32%	19%	6%	11
2–3 Jun	ICM	Evening Standard	1,381	47%	30%	18%	?	17
3 Jun	Rasmussen	The Independent	?	44%	33%	16%	?	11
31 May – 2 Jun	MORI	The Sunday Telegraph	1,070	50%	27%	17%	?	23
31 May – 1 Jun	ICM	The Observer	1,005	46%	34%	15%	?	12
31 May – 1 Jun	NOP	The Sunday Times	1,105	47%	30%	16%	?	17
30 May – 1 Jun	ICM	Channel 4	1,007	43%	31%	19%	?	12
29 May	MORI	The Times	1,013	48%	30%	16%	?	18
28–29 May	Gallup	The Daily Telegraph	1,462	47%	31%	16%	?	16
26–28 May	ICM	The Guardian	1,000	47%	28%	17%	8%	19
27 May	Rasmussen	The Independent	?	44%	32%	17%	?	12
24–25 May	NOP	The Sunday Times	?	49%	30%	14%	?	19
21–23 May	Gallup	The Daily Telegraph	1,000	48%	32%	15%	?	16
22 May	MORI	Times	1,066	52%	27%	16%	?	25
22 May	Rasmussen	The Independent	?	44%	32%	16%	?	12
19–21 May	ICM	The Guardian	1,000	45%	32%	17%	7%	13
20 May	Gallup	BES	?	55%	25%	14%	?	30
17–18 May	NOP	The Sunday Times	1,107	49%	30%	14%	?	19
15 May	MORI	The Times	1,019	54%	28%	12%	6%	26
14–15 May	Gallup	The Daily Telegraph	1,004	48%	32%	13%	7%	16
13–14 May	ICM	The Guardian	1,004	46%	31%	16%	7%	15
14 May	Gallup	BES	?	53%	32%	11%	?	21
10–14 May	MORI	The Economist	1,846	54%	26%	14%	6%	28
14 May	Dissolution of Parliament and the official start of the election campaign							
11–13 May	ICM	Evening Standard	1,437	48%	32%	14%	6%	16
13 May	Rasmussen	The Independent	1,004	46%	32%	13%	9%	14
10–12 May	MORI	The Sunday Telegraph	1,030	51%	31%	13%	5%	20
10–11 May	ICM	The Observer	1,011	48%	32%	15%	5%	16
10–11 May	NOP	The Sunday Times	1,003	49%	32%	13%	6%	17
2–8 May	Gallup	The Daily Telegraph	1,000	49%	32%	13%	6%	17
8 May	MORI	The Times	1,046	54%	30%	13%	?	24
4–7 May	NOP	Daily Express	1,000	51%	31%	13%	6%	20
1–6 May	NOP	Channel 4	1,600	49%	34%	11%	?	15
26 Apr – 2 May	NOP	Channel 4	~2000	51%	29%	13%	5%	22
30 Apr – 1 May	MORI	The Sun	1,008	50%	32%	13%	5%	18
19–24 Apr	MORI	The Times	1,935	50%	30%	13%	7%	20
20–22 Apr	ICM	The Guardian	1,005	47%	33%	14%	6%	14
10–12 Apr	MORI	Daily Mail	1,003	53%	29%	12%	6%	24
4–10 Apr	Gallup	The Daily Telegraph	1,009	53%	27%	15%	5%	26
30 Mar – 4 Apr	NOP	Channel 4	1,575	52%	30%	12%	6%	22
30–31 Mar	MORI	The Sunday Telegraph	1,034	48%	32%	15%	5%	16
29–30 Mar	ICM	The Guardian	1,000	49%	34%	13%	4%	15
22–27 Mar	MORI	The Times	1,945	50%	31%	14%	5%	19
16–18 Mar	ICM	The Guardian	1,426	44%	35%	16%	6%	9
15–16 Mar	NOP	The Sunday Times	1,426	51%	31%	13%	5%	20
17 Feb – 13 Mar	Gallup	The Daily Telegraph	1,016	55%	29%	12%	3%	26
15–20 Feb	MORI	The Times	1,900	50%	30%	14%	5%	20
16–18 Feb	ICM	The Guardian	1,000	47%	32%	15%	7%	15
31 Jan – 7 Feb	Gallup	The Daily Telegraph	1,001	50%	29%	17%	4%	21
25–26 Jan	MORI	Mail on Sunday	1,007	49%	31%	14%	6%	18
18–22 Jan	MORI	The Times	2,083	50%	31%	14%	5%	19
19–21 Jan	ICM	The Guardian	1,004	44%	34%	16%	6%	10
10–16 Jan	Gallup	The Daily Telegraph	1,006	51%	31%	13%	6%	20
11–13 Jan	MORI	The Sunday Telegraph	1,007	52%	31%	11%	6%	21
11–12 Jan	NOP	The Sunday Times	1,232	48%	33%	14%	5%	15
4–6 Jan	MORI	Mail on Sunday	1,005	46%	35%	14%	5%	11

=== 2000 ===
Date(s) conducted	Pollster	Client	Sample size	Lab	Con	LD	Others	Lead
21 Dec	Falkirk West by-election (Lab hold)							
13–15 Dec	MORI	News of the World	1,003	**47%**	32%	16%	5%	15
6–13 Dec	Gallup	The Daily Telegraph	1,011	**47%**	32%	14%	7%	15
7–12 Dec	MORI	The Times	1,984	**46%**	34%	14%	6%	12
1–3 Dec	ICM	The Guardian	1,003	**44%**	34%	16%	6%	10
23–28 Nov	MORI	The Times	1,972	**48%**	33%	13%	6%	15
24–25 Nov	MORI	Mail on Sunday	1,006	**47%**	34%	13%	6%	13
23 Nov	Glasgow Anniesland by-election (Lab hold), Preston by-election (Lab hold) and West Bromwich West by-election (Lab gain from Spk)							
1–7 Nov	Gallup	The Daily Telegraph	1,010	**45%**	34%	14%	6%	11
3–5 Nov	ICM	The Guardian	1,001	**40%**	34%	20%	7%	6
2–3 Nov	MORI	Mail on Sunday	1,002	**42%**	34%	17%	7%	8
19–23 Oct	MORI	The Times	2,010	**45%**	32%	17%	6%	13
13–16 Oct	ICM	The Guardian	1,001	**40%**	35%	19%	6%	5
11–13 Oct	NOP	The Sunday Times	1,171	**42%**	35%	17%	6%	7
10 Oct	MORI	Carlton TV	1,014	**40%**	38%	19%	3%	2
28–30 Sep	ICM	News of the World	1,025	**38%**	37%	20%	6%	1
28–30 Sep	MORI	The Sun	1,006	**43%**	36%	16%	5%	7
28–29 Sep	NOP	Sunday Express	1,002	**43%**	37%	13%	7%	6
Sep	NOP	Labour Party	1,000	?	?	?	?	11
21–26 Sep	MORI	The Times	1,843	**37%**	35%	21%	7%	2
21 Sep	South Antrim by-election (DUP gain from UUP)							
20–26 Sep	Gallup	The Daily Telegraph	1,002	**39%**	36%	20%	5%	3
21–23 Sep	NOP	Channel 4	1,002	32%	**40%**	22%	6%	8
21–22 Sep	MORI	Mail on Sunday	1,014	35%	**39%**	21%	5%	4
14–19 Sep	MORI	Schroder Salomon Smith Barney	1,864	**36%**	**36%**	21%	7%	Tie
13–19 Sep	Gallup	The Daily Telegraph	1,006	35%	**40%**	16%	9%	5
15–17 Sep	ICM	The Guardian	1,055	34%	**38%**	22%	7%	4
14–16 Sep	NOP	The Sunday Times	1,002	**37%**	**37%**	21%	5%	Tie
14–15 Sep	MORI	News of the World	1,006	36%	**38%**	18%	8%	2
6–12 Sep	Gallup	The Daily Telegraph	1,006	**45%**	32%	16%	6%	13
6–12 Sep	MORI	N/A	2,004	**45%**	30%	17%	8%	15
7–14 Sep	Protests over the rising cost of fuel occur across the United Kingdom							
31 Aug – 6 Sep	MORI	N/A	1,818	**48%**	32%	13%	5%	16
17–21 Aug	MORI	The Times	1,916	**51%**	29%	15%	5%	22
17–18 Aug	MORI	News of the World	1,004	**51%**	32%	12%	5%	19
11–13 Aug	ICM	The Guardian	1,050	**44%**	34%	17%	8%	10
2–7 Aug	Gallup	The Daily Telegraph	1,005	**47%**	32%	14%	7%	15
20–24 Jul	MORI	The Times	2,019	**49%**	33%	12%	6	16
20–22 Jul	MORI	Mail on Sunday	1,011	**51%**	32%	11%	6%	19
14–15 Jul	ICM	The Guardian	1,056	**42%**	35%	17%	6%	7
12–14 Jul	MORI	Mail on Sunday	1,003	**47%**	32%	15%	6%	15
5–11 Jul	Gallup	The Daily Telegraph	1,016	**45%**	35%	14%	7%	10
29–30 Jun	MORI	Mail on Sunday	1,004	**46%**	32%	17%	5%	14
22–27 Jun	MORI	The Times	1,915	**47%**	33%	13%	7%	14
22 Jun	Tottenham by-election (Lab hold)							
23–26 Jun	ICM	The Guardian	1,061	**43%**	32%	17%	8%	11
22–23 Jun	MORI	News of the World	1,002	**47%**	34%	14%	5%	13
8–9 Jun	MORI	Mail on Sunday	1,008	**41%**	38%	16%	5%	3
31 May – 6 Jun	Gallup	The Daily Telegraph	1,007	**49%**	30%	15%	6%	19
18–23 May	MORI	The Times	1,891	**48%**	32%	15%	5%	16
17–19 May	MORI	Daily Mail	1,003	**46%**	33%	14%	7%	13
13–15 May	ICM	The Guardian	1,003	**41%**	34%	18%	7%	7
3–9 May	Gallup	The Daily Telegraph	1,009	**47%**	31%	14%	7%	16
6–7 May	ICM	Conservative Party	1,000	**43%**	35%	15%	7%	8
4 May	Local elections in England; Romsey by-election (LD gain from Con)							
13–18 Apr	MORI	The Times	1,860	**51%**	27%	15%	7%	24
14–15 Apr	ICM	The Guardian	1,203	**45%**	32%	15%	8%	13
5–11 Apr	Gallup	The Daily Telegraph	1,007	**50%**	32%	12%	6%	18
23–28 Mar	MORI	The Times	1,728	**50%**	29%	14%	7%	21
17–19 Mar	ICM	The Guardian	1,207	**44%**	32%	16%	8%	12
1–7 Mar	Gallup	The Daily Telegraph	1,018	**51%**	31%	11%	6%	20
17–22 Feb	MORI	The Times	1,938	**50%**	29%	15%	6%	21
11–13 Feb	ICM	The Guardian	1,205	**44%**	29%	18%	9%	15
2–6 Feb	Gallup	The Daily Telegraph	1,024	**49%**	28%	15%	8%	21
3 Feb	Ceredigion by-election (PC hold)							
25–27 Jan	MORI	Daily Mail	1,007	**49%**	29%	15%	7%	20
20–25 Jan	MORI	The Times	2,015	**50%**	30%	15%	5%	20
14–17 Jan	ICM	The Guardian	1,155	**47%**	30%	17%	6%	17
5–12 Jan	Gallup	The Daily Telegraph	1,005	**53%**	30%	12%	5%	23

=== 1999 ===
Date(s) conducted	Pollster	Client	Sample size	Lab	Con	LD	Others	Lead
10–14 Dec	MORI	The Times	1,967	54%	28%	13%	5%	26
10–12 Dec	ICM	The Guardian	1,201	48%	29%	17%	6%	19
25 Nov – 1 Dec	Gallup	The Daily Telegraph	1,011	53%	27%	15%	5%	26
25 Nov	Kensington & Chelsea by-election (Con hold)							
19–22 Nov	MORI	The Times	1,935	55%	25%	14%	6%	30
12–14 Nov	ICM	The Guardian	1,119	44%	34%	15%	7%	10
8–10 Nov	MORI	Daily Mail	1,003	50%	32%	12%	7%	18
27 Oct – 2 Nov	Gallup	The Daily Telegraph	1,002	52%	28%	14%	6%	24
22–26 Oct	ICM	The Guardian	1,084	45%	32%	17%	6%	13
22–25 Oct	MORI	The Times	1,965	56%	28%	11%	5%	28
13–14 Oct	MORI	The Sun	1,003	52%	31%	13%	7%	21
23–29 Sep	Gallup	The Daily Telegraph	1,012	52%	29%	13%	7%	23
24–27 Sep	MORI	The Times	1,823	52%	25%	17%	6%	27
23 Sep	Hamilton South by-election and Wigan by-election (both Lab holds)							
17–19 Sep	ICM	The Guardian	1,202	45%	32%	16%	6%	13
9–11 Sep	MORI	Mail on Sunday	1,002	49%	32%	13%	6%	17
25 Aug – 1 Sep	Gallup	The Daily Telegraph	1,000	52%	27%	13%	7%	25
20–23 Aug	MORI	The Times	1,862	49%	27%	17%	7%	22
13–15 Aug	ICM	The Guardian	1,204	48%	30%	16%	6%	18
9 Aug	Charles Kennedy is elected leader of the Liberal Democrats							
28 Jul – 4 Aug	Gallup	The Daily Telegraph	1,008	51%	30%	12%	7%	21
23–26 Jul	MORI	The Times	2,13	51%	28%	14%	7%	23
22 Jul	Eddisbury by-election (Con hold)							
9–11 Jul	ICM	The Guardian	1,200	48%	31%	16%	5%	17
18–21 Jun	MORI	The Times	2,028	51%	28%	13%	8%	23
10 Jun	European Parliament election; Leeds Central by-election (Lab hold)							
4–5 Jun	ICM	The Guardian	1,205	46%	29%	19%	7%	17
26 May – 1 Jun	Gallup	The Daily Telegraph	1,000	52%	24%	16%	8%	28
21–24 May	MORI	The Times	2,046	52%	28%	14%	6%	24
7–8 May	ICM	The Guardian	1,205	51%	28%	16%	6%	23
6 May	Local elections in England and Wales; Scottish Parliament election; Welsh Assembly election							
30 Apr – 1 May	MORI	Mail on Sunday	1,008	50%	30%	14%	6%	20
21–28 Apr	Gallup	The Daily Telegraph	1,006	52%	29%	13%	7%	23
23–26 Apr	MORI	The Times	1,966	56%	25%	13%	6%	31
16–17 Apr	ICM	The Guardian	1,205	52%	29%	16%	4%	23
30 Mar – 7 Apr	Gallup	The Daily Telegraph	1,014	54%	27%	13%	7%	27
19–22 Mar	MORI	The Times	1,907	54%	27%	13%	6%	27
5–7 Mar	ICM	The Guardian	1,217	52%	29%	16%	4%	23
26 Feb – 4 Mar	Gallup	The Daily Telegraph	1,002	52%	30%	11%	6%	22
19–22 Feb	MORI	The Times	1,907	51%	30%	14%	6%	21
5–7 Feb	ICM	The Guardian	1,211	49%	28%	16%	6%	21
28 Jan – 3 Feb	Gallup	The Daily Telegraph	1,069	53%	29%	13%	5%	24
22–25 Jan	MORI	The Times	1,930	56%	24%	14%	6%	32
6–12 Jan	NOP	Evening Standard	1,600	57%	25%	12%	6%	32
4–6 Jan	Gallup	The Daily Telegraph	1,017	52%	29%	13%	5%	23
30 Dec 1998 – 3 Jan 1999	ICM	The Guardian	1,209	50%	30%	15%	5%	20

=== 1998 ===
Date(s) conducted	Pollster	Client	Sample size	Lab	Con	LD	Others	Lead
9–15 Dec	NOP	Evening Standard	1,600	55%	27%	12%	7%	28
11–14 Dec	MORI	The Times	1,864	54%	27%	12%	6%	27
4–7 Dec	ICM	The Guardian	1,123	49%	29%	16%	6%	20
16 Nov – 2 Dec	Gallup	The Daily Telegraph	1,021	55%	29%	11%	5%	26
20–23 Nov	MORI	The Times	1,883	53%	29%	13%	5%	24
4–6 Nov	ICM	The Guardian	1,210	51%	27%	17%	5%	24
29 Oct – 4 Nov	Gallup	The Daily Telegraph	1,036	54%	28%	14%	5%	26
23–26 Oct	MORI	The Times	1,775	53%	26%	16%	5%	27
1–4 Oct	ICM	The Guardian	1,120	51%	29%	15%	5%	22
24–30 Sep	Gallup	The Daily Telegraph	1,028	57%	23%	15%	5%	34
18–21 Sep	MORI	The Times	1,789	56%	24%	15%	5%	32
4–6 Sep	ICM	The Guardian	1,178	48%	29%	17%	6%	19
26 Aug – 3 Sep	Gallup	The Daily Telegraph	1,005	54%	28%	12%	6%	26
21–24 Aug	MORI	The Times	1,886	52%	28%	14%	6%	24
7–9 Aug	ICM	The Guardian	1,203	47%	31%	17%	4%	16
30 Jul – 5 Aug	Gallup	The Daily Telegraph	1,003	53%	28%	13%	5%	25
17–21 Jul	MORI	The Times	1,796	53%	28%	14%	5%	25
3–4 Jul	ICM	The Guardian	1,203	52%	27%	17%	4%	25
25 Jun – 1 Jul	Gallup	The Daily Telegraph	1,006	52%	28%	14%	6%	24
25–30 Jun	MORI	The Times	1,760	56%	27%	13%	4%	29
24–26 Jun	MORI	The Sun	1,000	51%	28%	15%	6%	23
25 Jun	Northern Ireland Assembly election							
5–6 Jun	ICM	The Guardian	1,201	51%	29%	16%	4%	22
28 May – 3 Jun	Gallup	The Daily Telegraph	1,011	54%	28%	12%	6%	26
21–24 May	MORI	The Times	1,832	55%	26%	14%	5%	29
22 May	Good Friday Agreement referendum ("Yes" wins)							
15–19 May	ICM	The Guardian	1,101	50%	29%	16%	5%	21
7 May	Local elections in England; Greater London Authority referendum							
23–29 Apr	Gallup	The Daily Telegraph	1,050	54%	25%	16%	4%	29
24–27 Apr	MORI	The Times	1,926	55%	27%	14%	4%	28
24–26 Apr	MORI	The Sun	804	54%	30%	13%	3%	24
20–22 Apr	ICM	The Observer	1,000	52%	29%	16%	3%	23
3–5 Apr	ICM	The Guardian	1,212	48%	31%	16%	6%	17
26 Mar – 1 Apr	Gallup	The Daily Telegraph	985	54%	26%	16%	4%	28
20–23 Mar	MORI	The Times	1,879	53%	28%	14%	5%	25
6–8 Mar	ICM	The Guardian	1,200	46%	33%	17%	5%	13
26 Feb – 4 Mar	Gallup	The Daily Telegraph	999	51%	29%	14%	6%	22
20–23 Feb	MORI	The Times	1,792	52%	28%	15%	5%	24
6–8 Feb	ICM	The Guardian	1,200	47%	31%	18%	4%	16
28 Jan – 4 Feb	Gallup	The Daily Telegraph	1,041	54%	29%	11%	5%	25
23–26 Jan	MORI	The Times	1,870	54%	28%	14%	4%	26
9–11 Jan	ICM	The Guardian	1,200	48%	30%	17%	5%	18
5–7 Jan	Gallup	The Daily Telegraph	1,014	56%	26%	12%	5%	30

=== 1997 ===
Date(s) conducted	Pollster	Client	Sample size	Lab	Con	LD	Others	Lead
12–15 Dec	MORI	The Times	2,122	55%	26%	15%	4%	29
5–6 Dec	ICM	The Guardian	1,200	50%	29%	17%	4%	21
27 Nov – 3 Dec	Gallup	The Daily Telegraph	1,011	57%	21%	17%	5%	36
21–24 Nov	MORI	The Times	1,879	56%	24%	16%	4%	32
20 Nov	Beckenham by-election (Con hold) and Winchester by-election (LD hold)							
13–14 Nov	MORI	The Sun	603	56%	30%	11%	3%	26
7–8 Nov	ICM	The Guardian	1,200	52%	30%	14%	4%	22
6 Nov	Paisley South by-election (Lab hold)							
30 Oct – 4 Nov	Gallup	The Daily Telegraph	1,021	63%	23%	11%	4%	40
24–27 Oct	MORI	The Times	1,772	60%	24%	12%	4%	36
6 Oct	ICM	The Guardian	1,211	59%	23%	13%	4%	36
25 Sep – 1 Oct	Gallup	The Daily Telegraph	1,014	60%	22%	14%	4%	38
26–29 Sep	MORI	The Times	1,916	59%	25%	13%	3%	34
18 Sep	Welsh devolution referendum ("Yes" wins)							
11 Sep	Scottish devolution referendum ("Yes" wins)							
4–8 Sep	ICM	The Guardian	1,206	60%	24%	10%	6%	36
27 Aug – 3 Sep	Gallup	The Daily Telegraph	1,023	58%	26%	12%	5%	32
21–25 Aug	MORI	The Times	1,758	54%	28%	15%	3%	26
31 Jul – 6 Aug	Gallup	The Daily Telegraph	1,203	58%	25%	12%	4%	33
31 Jul	Uxbridge by-election (Con hold)							
25–28 Jul	MORI	The Times	1,901	57%	23%	15%	5%	34
27–28 Jun	ICM	The Guardian	1,200	61%	23%	12%	4%	38
20–23 Jun	MORI	The Times	1,852	58%	24%	15%	3%	34
19 Jun	William Hague is elected leader of the Conservative Party							
29 May – 4 Jun	Gallup	The Daily Telegraph	996	59%	23%	13%	5%	36
1 May 1997	1997 general election		–	43.2%	30.7%	16.8%	9.3%	12.5

== Exit polls ==
Two exit polls conducted by MORI for ITV and NOP for the BBC were published at the end of voting at 22:00, predicting the number of seats for each party.

Parties	MORI for ITV		NOP for BBC	
Parties	Seats	Change	Seats	Change
Labour Party	417	▼2	408	▼11
Conservative Party	154	▼11	177	▲12
Liberal Democrats	58	▲12	44	▼2
Others	30	▲1	30	▲1
	Labour majority of 175		Labour majority of 157	

== Sub-national poll results ==
=== Northern Ireland ===
Data from BBC News.

Date(s) conducted	Pollster	Client	Sample size	UUP	SDLP	SF	DUP	APNI	Lead
7 Jun 2001	2001 general election		–	**26.8%**	21%	21.7%	22.5%	3.6%	4.3
10–15 May 2001	Ulster Marketing Survey	Belfast Telegraph	1,031	**25%**	**25%**	16%	14%	5%	Tie
21 Sep 2000	South Antrim by-election								
25 Jun 1998	Election to the Northern Ireland Assembly								
22 May 1998	Good Friday Agreement Referendum								
21 May 1997	Local elections held								
1 May 1997	1997 general election		–	**32.7%**	24.1%	16.1%	13.6%	8%	8.6

=== Scotland ===
Data from BBC News.

Date(s) conducted	Pollster	Client	Sample size	Lab	SNP	Con	LD	SSP	Lead
7 Jun 2001	2001 general election		–	43.3%	20.1%	15.6%	16.3%	3.1%	23.2%
4–5 Jun 2001	ICM	The Scotsman	1,013	43%	24%	14%	14%	4%	19
24–28 May 2001	System Three	The Herald	1,048	47%	26%	13%	11%	3%	21
18–21 May 2001	System Three	The Herald	3,019	50%	25%	12%	9%	3%	25
12–13 May 2001	ICM	The Scotsman	1,000	44%	25%	16%	12%	–	19
26 Apr – 2 May 2001	System Three	The Herald	1,028	47%	27%	12%	9%	–	20
22–28 Mar 2001	System Three	The Herald	1,009	52%	25%	12%	8%	–	27
8–9 Mar 2001	ICM	News of the World	1,000	46%	22%	18%	11%	–	24
22 Feb – 4 Mar 2001	System Three	The Herald	955	45%	29%	16%	9%	–	16
14–15 Feb 2001	ICM	Scotland on Sunday	1,003	42%	22%	16%	10%	–	20
15–31 Jan 2001	System Three	The Herald	1,014	46%	28%	13%	11%	–	18
4–9 Jan 2001	System Three	The Herald	1,025	46%	28%	13%	9%	–	18
21 Dec 2000	Falkirk West by-election								
23–28 Nov 2000	System Three	The Herald	1,022	48%	24%	16%	9%	–	24
23 Nov	Glasgow Anniesland by-election								
22–31 Oct 2000	System Three	The Herald	1,001	48%	27%	13%	10%	–	21
21 Oct 2000	Henry McLeish is elected leader of Scottish Labour and First Minister								
21–26 Sep 2000	System Three	The Herald	1,020	33%	**33%**	15%	17%	–	Tie
21 Sep 2000	John Swinney is elected leader of the Scottish National Party								
18–20 Sep 2000	ICM	The Scotsman	1,000	36%	27%	22%	13%	–	9
18–20 Sep 2000	System Three	The Herald	1,027	45%	28%	15%	9%	–	17
27 Jul – 5 Aug 2000	System Three	The Herald	951	46%	26%	15%	9%	–	20
22–28 Jun 2000	System Three	The Herald	1,015	39%	31%	17%	11%	–	8
25–31 May 2000	System Three	The Herald	968	48%	24%	14%	10%	–	24
27 Apr – 2 May 2000	System Three	The Herald	999	44%	26%	17%	9%	–	18
23–28 Mar 2000	System Three	The Herald	991	40%	29%	16%	11%	–	11
24–29 Feb 2000	System Three	The Herald	1,030	45%	27%	15%	10%	–	18
27 Jan – 2 Feb 2000	System Three	The Herald	1,008	49%	24%	14%	11%	–	25
6–13 Jan 2000	System Three	The Herald	978	50%	27%	12%	9%	–	23
23 Sep 1999	Hamilton South by-election								
6 May 1999	Local elections held and Scottish Parliament election								
6 Nov 1997	Paisley South by-election								
11 Sep 1997	Scottish devolution referendum								
1 May 1997	1997 general election		–	45.6%	22.1%	17.5%	13%	N/A	23.5%

=== Wales ===
Data from BBC News.

Date(s) conducted	Pollster	Client	Sample size	Lab	Con	LD	PC	Lead
7 Jun 2001	2001 general election		–	48.6%	21%	13.8%	14.3%	27.6
Mar 2001	NOP	Harlech Television	1,003	52%	22%	10%	14%	30
26–31 Oct 2000	NOP	Harlech Television	1,000	45%	25%	13%	15%	20
29 Jun – 7 Jul 2000	NOP	Harlech Television	1,000	51%	25%	9%	13%	26
23–28 Feb 2000	Beaufort	BBC Wales	1,000	50%	20%	12%	16%	30
9 Feb 2000	Rhodri Morgan is elected leader of Welsh Labour and as First Secretary							
3 Feb 2000	Ceredigion by-election							
13–18 Jan 2000	NOP	Harlech Television	1,002	56%	21%	8%	13%	35
6 May 1999	Local elections held and Welsh Assembly election							
25–28 Feb 1999	Beaufort	BBC Wales	1,015	54%	20%	9%	16%	34
20 Feb 1999	Alun Michael is elected leader of Welsh Labour							
Feb 1999	NOP	Harlech Television	?	58%	20%	9%	12%	38
12–18 Feb 1999	Beaufort	BBC Wales	1,002	62%	15%	8%	14%	47
19 Sep 1998	Ron Davies is elected leader of Welsh Labour							
10–15 Sep 1998	NOP	Harlech Television	1,500	58%	11%	8%	21%	37
4–9 Jul 1998	Beaufort	BBC Wales	1,000	62%	16%	8%	13%	46
18 Sep 1997	Welsh devolution referendum							
1 May 1997	1997 general election		–	54.7%	19.6%	12.3%	9.9%	35.1
