= Martin Wrigley =

British Liberal Democrat politician

Martin Wrigley MP
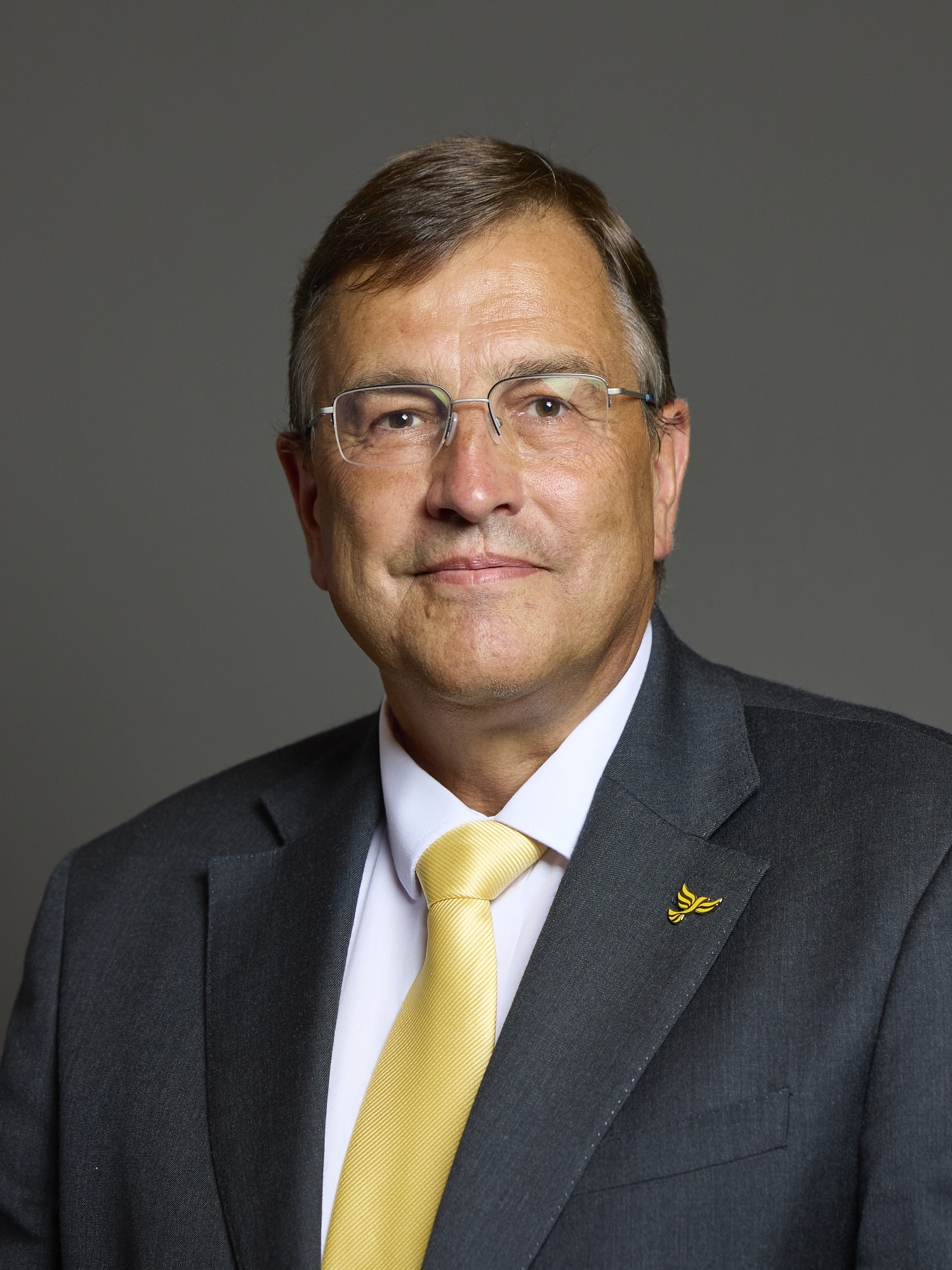
- Official portrait, 2024

Member of Parliament for Newton Abbot
- Incumbent
- Assumed office 4 July 2024
- Preceded by: Anne Marie Morris
- Majority: 2,246 (4.7%)

Personal details
- Born: John Martin Charles Wrigley
- Party: Liberal Democrats

John Martin Charles Wrigley is a British Liberal Democrat politician who has been the Member of Parliament for Newton Abbot since 2024.

Wrigley was leader of Teignbridge District Council until July 2024.

== Parliamentary career ==
Wrigley was elected to the House of Commons in the 2024 General Election, replacing Conservative MP Anne Marie Morris. He had previously worked in the technology industry for thirty years He is a member of the science, innovation and technology select committee and has criticised the role of Palantir as a government supplier.
