= 2001 United Kingdom general election =

- 7 June 2001

All 659 seats to the House of Commons 330 (Note: The 4 Sinn Féin MPs did not take their seats, so the effective number of seats in the House of Commons was 655, making a majority 328 seats.) seats needed for a majority
- Opinion polls
- Registered: 44,403,238
- Turnout: 26,367,383; 59.4% (▼11.9 pp)
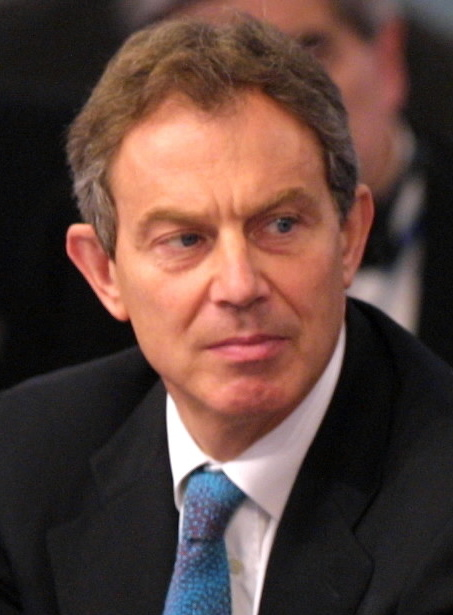

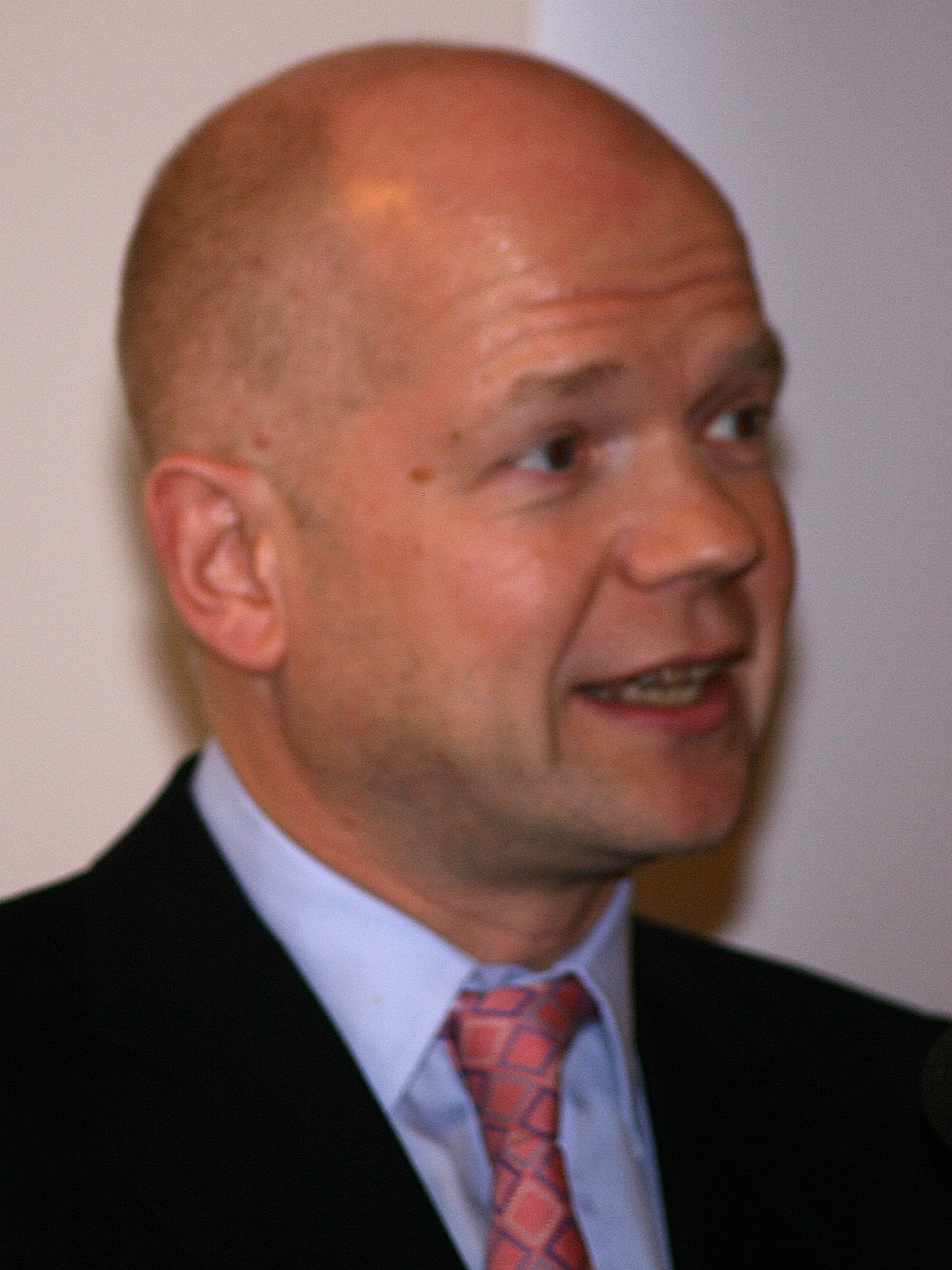

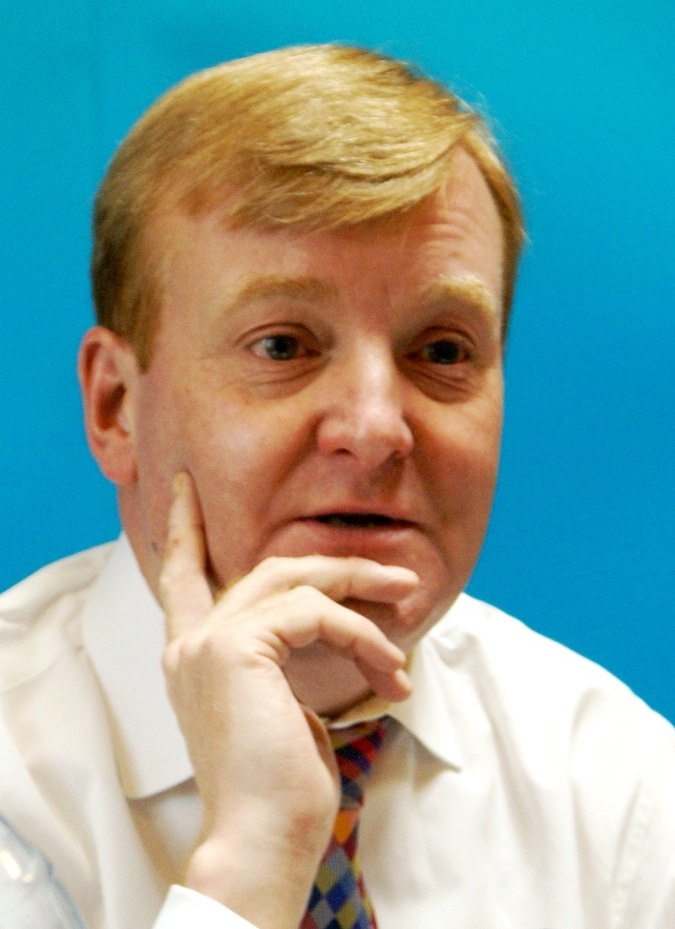
	First party	Second party	Third party
Leader	Tony Blair	William Hague	Charles Kennedy
Party	Labour	Conservative	Liberal Democrats
Leader since	21 July 1994	19 June 1997	9 August 1999
Leader's seat	Sedgefield	Richmond (Yorks)	Ross, Skye and Inverness West
Last election	418 seats, 43.2%	165 seats, 30.7%	46 seats, 16.8%
Seats won	412 (Note: Does not include the Speaker, Michael Martin, who was included in the Labour totals by some media outlets)	166	52
Seat change	▼6	▲1	▲6
Popular vote	10,724,953	8,357,615	4,814,321
Percentage	40.7%	31.7%	18.3%
Swing	▼2.5 pp	▲1.0 pp	▲1.5 pp
- Colours denote the winning party, as shown in the main table of results.

- Composition of the House of Commons after the election
Prime Minister before election
Tony Blair
Labour
Prime Minister after election
Tony Blair
Labour

A general election was held in the United Kingdom on 7 June 2001, four years after the previous election on 1 May 1997, to elect 659 members to the House of Commons. The governing Labour Party led by Prime Minister Tony Blair was re-elected to serve a second term in government with another landslide victory with a 166-seat majority, returning 412 members of Parliament versus 418 from the previous election, a net loss of six seats, although with a significantly lower turnout than before—59.4%, compared to 71.6% at the previous election.

The number of votes Labour received fell by nearly three million. Blair went on to become the only Labour prime minister to serve two consecutive full terms in office. As Labour retained almost all of their seats won in the 1997 landslide victory, the media dubbed the 2001 election "the quiet landslide". There was little change outside Northern Ireland, with 620 out of the 641 seats in Great Britain electing candidates from the same party as they did in 1997. A strong economy contributed to the Labour victory.

The opposition Conservative Party under William Hague's leadership was still deeply divided on the issue of Europe and the party's policy platform had drifted considerably to the right. The party put the issue of European monetary union, in particular the prospect of the UK joining the Eurozone, at the centre of its campaign but failed to resonate with the electorate. The Conservatives briefly had a narrow lead in the polls during the 2000 fuel strikes but Labour successfully resolved them by year end. Furthermore, a series of publicity stunts that backfired also harmed Hague, and he immediately announced his resignation as party leader when the election result was clear, formally stepping down three months later, therefore becoming the first leader of the Conservative Party in the House of Commons since Austen Chamberlain nearly eighty years prior not to serve as prime minister.

The election was largely a repeat of the 1997 general election, with Labour losing only six seats overall and the Conservatives making a net gain of one seat (gaining nine seats but losing eight). The Conservatives gained a seat in Scotland, which ended the party's status as an "England-only" party in the prior parliament, but failed again to win any seats in Wales. The Liberal Democrats, now led by Charles Kennedy, made a net gain of six seats.

Exceptionally low voter turnout, which fell below 60% for the first time since 1918, also marked this election. The election was broadcast live on BBC One and presented by David Dimbleby, Jeremy Paxman, Andrew Marr, Peter Snow, and Tony King. The 2001 general election was notable for being the first in which pictures of the party logos appeared on the ballot paper. Prior to this, the ballot paper had only displayed the candidate's name, address, and party name.

Three future Prime Ministers entered parliament at this election: David Cameron and Boris Johnson for the Conservatives, and Andy Burnham for Labour. In addition, future Conservative Chancellor of the Exchequer George Osborne was first elected to the Commons in 2001; Osborne would serve in the same Cabinet as Cameron from 2010 to 2016. At the same time, several notable MPs either stood down or retired from their seats, including former Prime Ministers Edward Heath (also Father of the House) and John Major, former Deputy Prime Minister Michael Heseltine, former Liberal Democrat leader Paddy Ashdown, former Cabinet ministers Tony Benn, Tom King, John Morris, Mo Mowlam, John MacGregor and Peter Brooke, Teresa Gorman, and then Mayor of London Ken Livingstone.

== Background ==
The elections were marked by voter apathy, with turnout falling to 59.4%, the lowest (and first under 70%) since the Coupon Election of 1918. Throughout the election the Labour Party had maintained a significant lead in the opinion polls and the result was deemed to be so certain that some bookmakers paid out for a Labour majority before election day. However, the opinion polls the previous autumn had shown the first Tory lead (though only by a narrow margin) in the opinion polls for eight years as they benefited from the public anger towards the government over the fuel protests which had led to a severe shortage of motor fuel.

By the end of 2000, however, the dispute had been resolved and Labour were firmly back in the lead of the opinion polls. In total, a mere 29 parliamentary seats changed hands at the 2001 Election.

2001 also saw the rare election of an independent. Richard Taylor of Independent Kidderminster Hospital and Health Concern (usually now known simply as "Health Concern") unseated a government MP, David Lock, in Wyre Forest. There was also a high vote for British National Party leader Nick Griffin in Oldham West and Royton, in the wake of recent race riots in the town of Oldham.

In Northern Ireland, the election was far more dramatic and marked a move by unionists away from support for the Good Friday Agreement, with the moderate Ulster Unionist Party (UUP) losing four seats to the more hardline Democratic Unionist Party (DUP). This polarisation was also seen in the nationalist community, with the moderate Social Democratic and Labour Party (SDLP) losing votes to the more staunchly left-wing, republican and abstentionist Sinn Féin. It also saw a tightening of the parties as the small UK Unionist Party lost its only seat.

== Campaign ==
The election had been expected on 3 May, to coincide with local elections, but on 2 April 2001, the local elections were postponed to 7 June because of rural movement restrictions imposed in response to the foot-and-mouth outbreak that had started in February.

On 8 May, Prime Minister Tony Blair announced that the general election would be held on the 7 June as expected, on the same day as the local elections. Blair made the announcement in a speech at St Saviour's and St Olave's Church of England School in Bermondsey, London rather than on the steps of Downing Street.

For Labour, the last four years had run relatively smoothly. The party had successfully defended all their by election seats, and many suspected a Labour win was inevitable from the start.

Many in the party, however, were afraid of voter apathy, which was epitomised in a poster of "Hague with Margaret Thatcher's hair", captioned "Get out and vote. Or they get in." Despite recessions in mainland Europe and the United States, due to the bursting of global tech bubbles, Britain was notably unaffected, and Labour could therefore rely on a strong economy as unemployment continued to decline toward election day, putting to rest any fears of a Labour government putting the economic situation at risk.

For William Hague, however, the Conservative Party had still not fully recovered from the loss in 1997. The party was still divided over Europe, and talk of a referendum on joining the Eurozone was rife; as a result, 'Save The Pound' was one of the key slogans deployed in the Conservatives' campaign. As Labour remained at the political centre, the Conservatives moved to the right. A policy gaffe by Oliver Letwin over public spending cuts left the party with an own goal that Labour soon exploited.

Thatcher gave a speech to the Conservative Election Rally in Plymouth on 22 May 2001, calling New Labour 'rootless, empty and artificial'. She also added to Hague's troubles when speaking out strongly against the Euro to applause. Hague himself, although a witty performer at Prime Minister's Questions, was dogged in the press and reminded of a speech he gave at the 1977 Conservative Conference. The Sun newspaper only added to the Conservatives' woes by backing Labour for a second consecutive election, calling Hague a 'dead parrot' during the Conservative Party's conference in October 1998.

The Conservatives campaigned on a strongly right-wing platform, emphasising the issues of Europe, immigration and tax, the fabled 'Tebbit Trinity'. They also released a poster showing a heavily pregnant Tony Blair, stating: 'Four years of Labour and he still hasn't delivered.' However, Labour countered by asking where the proposed tax cuts were going to come from, and decried the Tory policy as 'cut here, cut there, cut everywhere', playing to the widespread belief that the Conservatives would make major cuts to public services in order to fund tax cuts. Labour also capitalised on the strong economic conditions of the time, and another major line of attack (primarily directed towards Michael Portillo, now Shadow Chancellor after having returned to Parliament via a by-election) was to warn of a return to 'Tory Boom and Bust' under a Conservative administration.

Charles Kennedy contested his first election as leader of the Liberal Democrats.

During the election Sharron Storer, a resident of Birmingham, criticised Prime Minister Tony Blair in front of television cameras about conditions in the National Health Service. The widely televised incident happened on 16 May during a campaign visit by Blair to the Queen Elizabeth Hospital in Birmingham. Sharron Storer's partner, Keith Sedgewick, a cancer patient with non-Hodgkin lymphoma and therefore highly susceptible to infection, was being treated at the time in the bone marrow unit, but no bed could be found for him and he was transferred to the casualty unit for his first 24 hours. On the evening of the same day Deputy Prime Minister John Prescott punched a protestor after being hit by an egg on his way to an election rally in Rhyl, North Wales.

== Endorsements ==
- Labour received endorsements from The Sun, The Times, and The Daily Express (The Express for the first time in its history), The Daily Mirror, The Financial Times, The Economist, and The Guardian.
- The Independent endorsed Labour and the Liberal Democrats.
- The Conservatives were endorsed by the Daily Mail and The Daily Telegraph.

== Opinion polling ==
Labour Conservatives Liberal Democrats

== Results ==
Constituency results by party

Equal-area projection of constituency results

Equal-area projection of constituency gains

Result by countries and English regions

The election result was effectively a repeat of 1997, as the Labour Party retained an overwhelming majority, with the BBC announcing the victory at 2:58 am, Friday 8 June. Having presided over relatively serene political, economic and social conditions, the feeling of prosperity in the United Kingdom had been maintained into the new millennium, and Labour would have a free hand to assert its ideals in the subsequent parliament. Despite the victory, voter apathy was a major issue: turnout fell below 60%, 12 percentage points down on 1997. All three of the main parties saw their total votes fall, with Labour's total vote dropping by 2.8 million on 1997, the Conservatives' by 1.3 million, and the Liberal Democrats' by 428,000. This dramatic fall was widely attributed to the general acceptance of the status quo and the likelihood of Labour's majority remaining unassailable.

For the Conservatives, the huge loss they had sustained in 1997 was repeated. Despite gaining nine seats, they lost seven to the Liberal Democrats, and even one to Labour (South Dorset). William Hague was quick to announce his resignation, doing so at 7:44 am outside the Conservative Party headquarters. Some believed that Hague had been unlucky – although considered by most to be a talented orator and an intelligent statesman, he had come up against the charismatic Tony Blair in the peak of his political career, and it was inevitable that little progress would be made in reducing Labour's majority after a relatively smooth parliament.

Staying at what they considered rock bottom, however, showed that the Conservatives had failed to improve their negative public image, had remained somewhat divided over Europe and had not regained the trust that they had lost in the 1990s. Hague's focus on the 'Save The Pound' campaign narrative had failed to gain any traction; Labour's successful counter-tactic was to be repeatedly vague over the issue of future monetary union – and said that the UK would only consider joining the Eurozone 'when conditions were right'. But in Scotland, despite flipping one seat from the Scottish National Party, their vote collapse continued. They failed to retake former strongholds in Scotland as the Nationalists consolidated their grip on the Northeastern portion of the country.

The Liberal Democrats, under their new leader, Charles Kennedy, gained six seats – marking a continuation in their recent increase in popularity as per the 1997 election, where the party had more than doubled its parliamentary representation from 20 to 46 seats.

The SNP failed to gain any new seats and lost a seat to the Conservatives, though by just 79 votes. In Wales, Plaid Cymru both gained a seat from Labour and lost one to them.

In Northern Ireland, the Ulster Unionists, despite gaining North Down, lost five other seats.

=== Summary of seats returned ===
Party	Leader	MPs		Aggregate votes	
Party	Leader		Of total		Of total
Labour Party	Tony Blair	412 (Note: Includes 30 Co-operative Party MP, as part of the Labour-Co-op alliance.)	62.5%	10,724,953	40.7%
Conservative and Unionist Party	William Hague	166	25.2%	8,357,615	31.7%
Liberal Democrats	Charles Kennedy	52	7.9%	4,814,321	18.3%
Ulster Unionist Party	David Trimble	6	0.9%	216,839	0.8%
Scottish National Party	John Swinney	5	0.8%	464,314	1.8%
Democratic Unionist Party	Ian Paisley	5	0.8%	181,999	0.7%
Plaid Cymru	Ieuan Wyn Jones	4	0.6%	195,893	0.7%
Sinn Féin	Gerry Adams	4	0.6%	175,933	0.7%
Social Democratic and Labour Party	John Hume	3	0.5%	169,865	0.6%
Health Concern	Richard Taylor	1	0.2%	28,487	0.0%
Speaker	Michael Martin	1	0.2%	16,053	0.1%

=== Full results ===

UK General Election 2001
		Candidates						Votes		
Party	Leader	Stood	Elected	Gained	Unseated	Net	% of total	%	No.	Net %
Labour	Tony Blair	640 (Note: Includes 30 Co-operative Party candidates, as part of the Labour-Co-op alliance)	412 (Note: Includes 30 Co-operative Party MPs, as part of the Labour-Co-op alliance)	2	8	−6 (Note: Includes +2 Co-operative Party MPs, as part of the Labour-Co-op alliance)	62.5 (Note: Includes 4.6% for the Co-operative Party, as part of the Labour-Co-op alliance)	40.7 (Note: Includes 2.3% for the Co-operative Party, as part of the Labour-Co-op alliance)	10,724,953 (Note: Includes 601,197 for the Co-operative Party, as part of the Labour-Co-op alliance)	−2.5 (Note: Includes +0.2% for the Co-operative Party, as part of the Labour-Co-op alliance)
Conservative	William Hague	643	166	9	8	+1	25.2	31.6	8,357,615	+1.0
Liberal Democrats	Charles Kennedy	639	52	8	2	+6	7.9	18.3	4,814,321	+1.5
SNP	John Swinney	72	5	0	1	−1	0.8	1.8	464,314	−0.2
UKIP	Jeffrey Titford	428	0	0	0	0	0.0	1.5	390,563	+1.2
UUP	David Trimble	17	6	1	5	−4	0.9	0.8	216,839	0.0
Plaid Cymru	Ieuan Wyn Jones	40	4	1	1	0	0.6	0.7	195,893	+0.2
DUP	Ian Paisley	14	5	3	0	+3	0.8	0.7	181,999	+0.4
Sinn Féin	Gerry Adams	18	4	2	0	+2	0.6	0.7	175,933	+0.3
SDLP	John Hume	18	3	0	0	0	0.5	0.6	169,865	0.0
Green	Margaret Wright and Mike Woodin	145	0	0	0	0	0.0	0.6	166,477	+0.3
Independent	N/A	137	0	0	1	−1	0.0	0.4	98,917	+0.3
Scottish Socialist	Tommy Sheridan	72	0	0	0	0	0.0	0.3	72,516	N/A
Socialist Alliance	N/A	98	0	0	0	0	0.0	0.2	57,553	N/A
Socialist Labour	Arthur Scargill	114	0	0	0	0	0.0	0.2	57,288	0.0
BNP	Nick Griffin	33	0	0	0	0	0.0	0.2	47,129	+0.1
Alliance	Seán Neeson	10	0	0	0	0	0.0	0.1	28,999	−0.1
Health Concern	Richard Taylor	1	1	1	0	+1	0.2	0.1	28,487	N/A
Speaker	N/A	1	1	1	0	+1	0.2	0.1	16,053	N/A
Liberal	Michael Meadowcroft	13	0	0	0	0	0.0	0.1	13,685	0.0
UK Unionist	Robert McCartney	1	0	0	1	−1	0.0	0.1	13,509	+0.1
ProLife Alliance	Bruno Quintavalle	37	0	0	0	0	0.0	0.0	9,453	−0.1
Legalise Cannabis	Alun Buffry	13	0	0	0	0	0.0	0.0	8,677	N/A
People's Justice	Shaukat Ali Khan	3	0	0	0	0	0.0	0.0	7,443	N/A
Monster Raving Loony	Howling Laud Hope and Catmando	15	0	0	0	0	0.0	0.0	6,655	0.0
PUP	Hugh Smyth	2	0	0	0	0	0.0	0.0	4,781	0.0
Mebyon Kernow	Dick Cole	3	0	0	0	0	0.0	0.0	3,199	0.0
NI Women's Coalition	Monica McWilliams and Pearl Sagar	1	0	0	0	0	0.0	0.0	2,968	0.0
Scottish Unionist	Danny Houston	2	0	0	0	0	0.0	0.0	2,728	N/A
Rock 'n' Roll Loony	Chris Driver	7	0	0	0	0	0.0	0.0	2,634	N/A
National Front	Tom Holmes	5	0	0	0	0	0.0	0.0	2,484	0.0
Workers' Party	Seán Garland	6	0	0	0	0	0.0	0.0	2,352	0.0
Neath Port Talbot Ratepayers	Paul Evans	1	0	0	0	0	0.0	0.0	1,960	N/A
NI Unionist	Cedric Wilson	6	0	0	0	0	0.0	0.0	1,794	N/A
Socialist	Peter Taaffe	2	0	0	0	0	0.0	0.0	1,454	0.0
Reform 2000	Erol Basarik	5	0	0	0	0	0.0	0.0	1,418	N/A
Isle of Wight	Philip Murray	1	0	0	0	0	0.0	0.0	1,164	N/A
Muslim		4	0	0	0	0	0.0	0.0	1,150	N/A
Communist	Robert Griffiths	6	0	0	0	0	0.0	0.0	1,003	0.0
New Britain	Dennis Delderfield	1	0	0	0	0	0.0	0.0	888	0.0
Free Party	Bob Dobbs	3	0	0	0	0	0.0	0.0	832	N/A
Leeds Left Alliance	Mike Davies	1	0	0	0	0	0.0	0.0	770	N/A
New Millennium Bean Party	Captain Beany	1	0	0	0	0	0.0	0.0	727	N/A
Workers Revolutionary	Sheila Torrance	6	0	0	0	0	0.0	0.0	607	0.0
Tatton	Paul Williams	1	0	0	0	0	0.0	0.0	505	N/A

Government's new majority	165
Total votes cast	26,367,383
Turnout	59.4%

All parties with more than 500 votes shown.

The seat gains reflect changes on the 1997 general election result. Two seats had changed hands in by-elections in the intervening period. These were as follows:

- Romsey from Conservative to Liberal Democrats. The Liberal Democrats held this seat in 2001.
- South Antrim from Ulster Unionists to Democratic Unionists. The Ulster Unionists won this seat back in 2001.

Seats won in the election (outer ring) against number of votes (inner ring).

The results of the election give a Gallagher index of dis-proportionality of 17.74.

Popular vote
Labour	40.7%
Conservative	31.7%
Liberal Democrat	18.3%
Scottish National	1.8%
UK Independence	1.5%
Others	6.1%

Parliamentary seats
Labour	62.7%
Conservative	25.2%
Liberal Democrat	7.9%
Ulster Unionist	0.9%
Scottish National	0.8%
Democratic Unionist	0.8%
Others	1.8%

=== Results by constituent country ===
	LAB	CON	LD	SNP	PC	NI parties	Others	Total
England	323	165	40	–	–	–	1	529
Wales	34	–	2	–	4	–	–	40
Scotland	56	1	10	5	–	–	–	72
Northern Ireland	–	–	–	–	–	18	–	18
Total	413	166	52	5	4	18	1	659

=== Seats changing hands ===
Seat	1997 election	Constituency result 2001 by party						2001 election
Seat	1997 election	Con	Lab	Lib	PC	SNP	Others	2001 election
Belfast North	UUP							DUP
Carmarthen East and Dinefwr	Labour	4,912	13,540	2,815	16,130		656	Plaid Cymru
Castle Point	Labour	17,738	16,753	3,116			1273	Conservative
Cheadle	Conservative	18,444	6,086	18,477			599	Liberal Democrats
Chesterfield	Labour	3,613	18,663	21,249			437	Liberal Democrats
Dorset Mid and Poole North	Conservative	17,974	6,765	18,358			621	Liberal Democrats
South Dorset	Conservative	18,874	19,027	6,531			913	Labour
Fermanagh and South Tyrone	UUP							Sinn Féin
Galloway and Upper Nithsdale	SNP	12,222	7,258	3,698		12,148	588	Conservative
Guildford	Conservative	19,820	6,558	20,358			736	Liberal Democrats
Isle of Wight	Liberal Democrats	25,223	9,676	22,397			2,106	Conservative
Londonderry East	UUP							DUP
Ludlow	Conservative	16,990	5,785	18,620			871	Liberal Democrats
Newark	Labour	20,983	16,910	5,970				Conservative
Norfolk North	Conservative	23,495	7,490	23,978			649	Liberal Democrats
Norfolk North West	Labour	24,846	21,361	4,292			704	Conservative
North Down	UK Unionist							UUP
Romford	Labour	18,931	12,954	2,869				Conservative
Romsey	Conservative	20,386	3,986	22,756				Liberal Democrats
Strangford	UUP							DUP
Tatton	Independent	19,860	11,249	7,685				Conservative
Taunton	Liberal Democrats	23,033	8,254	22,798			1,140	Conservative
Teignbridge	Conservative	23,332	7,366	26,343				Liberal Democrats
Tyrone West	UUP							Sinn Féin
Upminster	Labour	15,410	14,169	3,183			1,089	Conservative
Wyre Forest	Labour	9,350	10,857				28,487	Health Concern
Ynys Mon	Plaid Cymru	7,653	11,906	2,772	11,106			Labour

=== MPs who lost their seats ===
Party	Name	Constituency	Office held whilst in power	Year elected	Defeated by	Party
Labour Party	Alan Williams	Carmarthen East and Dinefwr		1987	Adam Price	Plaid Cymru
Labour Party	Christine Butler	Castle Point		1997	Dr. Bob Spink	Conservative Party
Labour Party	Fiona Jones	Newark		1997	Colonel; Patrick Mercer	Conservative Party
Labour Party	George Turner	Norfolk North West		1997	Henry Bellingham	Conservative Party
Labour Party	Eileen Gordon	Romford		1997	Andrew Rosindell	Conservative Party
Labour Party	Keith Darvill	Upminster		1997	Angela Watkinson	Conservative Party
Labour Party	David Lock	Wyre Forest		1997	Dr. Richard Taylor	Independent Kidderminster Hospital and Health Concern
Conservative Party	Stephen Day	Cheadle		1987	Patsy Calton	Liberal Democrats
Conservative Party	Christopher Fraser	Mid Dorset and North Poole		1997	Annette Brooke	Liberal Democrats
Conservative Party	Ian Bruce	South Dorset		1987	Jim Knight	Labour Party
Conservative Party	Nick St Aubyn	Guildford		1997	Sue Doughty	Liberal Democrats
Conservative Party	The Hon. David Prior	Norfolk North		1997	Norman Lamb	Liberal Democrats
Conservative Party	Patrick Nicholls	Teignbridge		1983	Richard Younger-Ross	Liberal Democrats
Liberal Democrats	Dr. Peter Brand	Isle of Wight		1997	Andrew Turner	Conservative Party
Liberal Democrats	Jackie Ballard	Taunton		1997	Adrian Flook	Conservative Party
Ulster Unionist Party	Willie Ross	East Londonderry		1974	Gregory Campbell	Democratic Unionist Party
Ulster Unionist Party	Cecil Walker	North Belfast		1983	Nigel Dodds	Democratic Unionist Party
Ulster Unionist Party	William Thompson	West Tyrone		1997	Pat Doherty	Sinn Féin
Democratic Unionist Party	William McCrea	Antrim South		2000	David Burnside	Ulster Unionist Party
UK Unionist Party	Robert McCartney	North Down		1995	Sylvia Hermon	Ulster Unionist Party
Independent	Martin Bell	Tatton contesting Brentwood and Ongar		1997	Eric Pickles	Conservative Party

=== Voter demographics ===
MORI interviewed 18,657 adults in Great Britain after the election which suggested the following demographic breakdown:

The 2001 UK general election vote in Great Britain (in per cent)
Social Group	Lab	Con	Lib Dem	Others	Lead	Turnout
Total	42	33	19	6	9	59
Gender
Men	42	32	18	8	10	61
Women	42	33	19	6	9	58
Age
18–24	41	27	24	8	14	39
25–34	51	24	19	6	27	46
35–44	45	28	19	8	17	59
45–54	41	32	20	7	9	65
55–64	37	39	17	7	2	69
65+	39	40	17	4	1	70
Social class
AB	30	39	25	6	9	68
C1	38	36	20	6	2	60
C2	49	29	15	7	20	56
DE	55	24	13	8	31	53
Work status
Full time	43	30	20	7	13	57
Part time	43	29	21	7	14	56
Not working	41	36	18	5	5	63
Unemployed	54	23	11	12	31	44
Self-employed	32	39	18	11	7	60
Housing tenure
Owner	32	43	19	6	11	68
Mortgage	42	31	20	7	11	59
Council/HA	60	18	14	8	42	52
Private rent	40	28	25	7	12	46
Men by age
18–24	38	29	26	7	9	43
25–34	52	24	19	5	28	47
35–54	43	29	19	9	14	64
55+	39	39	16	6	Tie	73
Men by social class
AB	31	38	25	6	7	68
C1	39	36	14	11	3	62
C2	49	28	14	9	21	56
DE	55	23	14	8	32	56
Women by age
18–24	45	24	23	8	21	36
25–34	49	25	19	7	24	46
35–54	43	31	20	6	12	60
55+	38	40	18	4	2	67
Women by social class
AB	28	41	26	5	13	68
C1	37	37	20	6	Tie	59
C2	48	30	17	5	18	56
DE	56	25	13	6	31	50
Readership
Daily Express	33	43	19	5	10	63
Daily Mail	24	55	17	4	31	65
Daily Mirror	71	11	13	5	58	62
Daily Record	59	8	10	23	36	57
The Daily Telegraph	16	65	14	5	49	71
Financial Times	30	48	21	1	18	64
The Guardian	52	6	34	8	18	68
The Independent	38	12	44	6	6	69
Daily Star	56	21	17	6	35	48
The Sun	52	29	11	8	23	50
The Times	28	40	26	6	12	66
No daily paper	45	27	22	6	18	56
Evening Standard	42	29	21	8	13	51
Sunday Readership
News of the World	55	27	12	6	28	52
Sunday Express	29	47	20	4	18	67
Sunday Mail	53	14	13	20	33	59
Sunday Mirror	72	16	9	3	56	62
The Sunday Post	43	22	18	17	21	64
The Sunday Telegraph	17	63	13	7	46	71
The Mail on Sunday	25	53	17	5	28	65
The Observer	53	4	34	9	19	71
Sunday People	65	19	13	3	46	60
The Sunday Times	29	40	24	7	11	67
Independent on Sunday	47	10	37	6	10	70
No Sunday paper	42	30	22	6	12	55

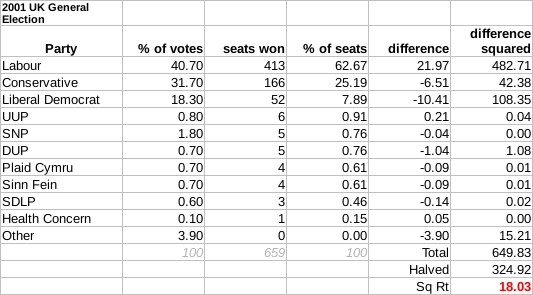
The disproportionality of the house of parliament in the 2001 election was 18.03 according to the Gallagher index, mainly between Labour and the Liberal Democrats.

== See also ==
- List of MPs elected in the 2001 United Kingdom general election
- Results of the 2001 United Kingdom general election
- 2001 United Kingdom foot-and-mouth outbreak
- 2001 United Kingdom general election in England
- 2001 United Kingdom general election in Scotland
- 2001 United Kingdom general election in Wales
- 2001 United Kingdom general election in Northern Ireland
- List of MPs for constituencies in Wales (2001–2005)
- List of MPs for constituencies in Scotland (2001–2005)
- 2001 United Kingdom local elections

== Bibliography ==
- Butler, David and Dennis Kavanagh. The British General Election of 2001 (2002), the standard scholarly study
- Morgan, Bryn (18 June 2001). "General Election Results, 7 June 2001 [Revised Edition]" (PDF). Research Paper 01/54. House of Commons Library.
