= Colin Brown (cricketer) =

English cricketer

Personal information
- Full name: Colin Edwin Brown
- Born: 12 October 1878; North Curry, Taunton, Somerset, England
- Died: 25 June 1936 (aged 57); Whitby, Yorkshire, England

Domestic team information
- Years: Team
- 1902–1905: Somerset

Career statistics
Competition	FC
Matches	8
Runs scored	151
Batting average	12.58
100s/50s	0/1
Top score	53
Balls bowled	18
Wickets	0
Bowling average	–
5 wickets in innings	–
10 wickets in match	–
Best bowling	0/4
Catches/stumpings	6/–
- Source: CricketArchive, 22 December 2015

Colin Edwin Brown (12 October 1878 – 25 June 1936) played first-class cricket for Somerset in 1902 and 1905. He was born at North Curry, Taunton, Somerset and died at Whitby, North Yorkshire.

Brown was a lower-order batsman and an occasional bowler. It is not known whether he batted left- or right-handed or what his bowling style was. He appeared in one match for Somerset in 1902 with little success, and returned for seven further games in 1905. His only batting success came in the match against Lancashire in 1905, when he made 53 in the second innings, more than double his second highest career score; in this match, the Lancashire bowler Walter Brearley took 17 Somerset wickets, including four wickets in four balls – the last two of the first innings and the first two of the second innings. Brown was dismissed by Brearley in both innings, and Somerset lost the game by an innings and 160 runs inside two days.
