= Teignbridge (constituency) =

UK Parliament constituency (1983–2010)

Coordinates: 50.546°N 3.497°W

- Former county constituency for the House of Commons
- Boundary of Teignbridge in Devon for the 2005 general election

- Location of Devon within England
- County: Devon

1983–2010
- Seats: One
- Created from: Totnes and Tiverton
- Replaced by: Newton Abbot, Central Devon

Teignbridge was, from 1983 until 2010, a county constituency represented in the House of Commons of the Parliament of the United Kingdom. It elected one Member of Parliament (MP) by the first past the post system of election.

== Boundaries and history ==
1983–1997: The District of Teignbridge wards of Abbotskerwell, Ambrook, Ashburton, Bishopsteignton, Bradley, Buckfastleigh, Buckland, Bushell, Chudleigh, college, Dawlish Central, Dawlish North East, Dawlish South West, Haldon, Haytor, Ipplepen, Kingskerwell, Kingsteignton East, Kingsteignton West, Milber, Moorland, Moretonhampstead, Shaldon, Teignhydes, Teignmouth Central, Teignmouth East, Teignmouth North, and Teignmouth West, and the District of South Hams ward of Eastmoor.

1997–2010: The District of Teignbridge wards of Abbotskerwell, Bishopsteignton, Bradley, Buckland, Bushell, Chudleigh, college, Dawlish Central, Dawlish North East, Dawlish South West, Haldon, Haytor, Ipplepen, Kingskerwell, Kingsteignton East, Kingsteignton West, Milber, Moorland, Moretonhampstead, Shaldon, Teignhydes, Teignmouth Central, Teignmouth East, Teignmouth North, and Teignmouth West.

The constituency was based on the Teignbridge local government district in Devon. It was created in 1983 from parts of the seats of Totnes and Tiverton. Towns in the constituency included Dawlish, Newton Abbot and Teignmouth.

The seat was held by Patrick Nicholls of the Conservative Party from its creation until his defeat by Richard Younger-Ross of the Liberal Democrats at the 2001 general election. Younger-Ross successfully defended the seat in 2005, with a majority of 6,215 over the Conservatives' Stanley Johnson, the father of Boris Johnson.

=== Abolition ===
Following a review of parliamentary representation in Devon by the Boundary Commission for England, which increased the number of seats in the county from 11 to 12, the Teignbridge constituency was abolished. The southern part, including the main towns of Dawlish, Newton Abbot and Teignmouth, formed the new Newton Abbot seat, while the northern portion formed part of Central Devon.

== Members of Parliament ==
Election	Member	Party
1983	Patrick Nicholls	Conservative
2001	Richard Younger-Ross	Liberal Democrats
2010	Constituency abolished: see Newton Abbot and Central Devon	

== Elections ==
=== Elections in the 1980s ===
General election 1983: Teignbridge
Party	Candidate	Votes	%	±%
Conservative	Patrick Nicholls	28,265	54.0	
Liberal	John Alderson	20,047	38.3	
Labour	Michael Loughlin	3,749	7.2	
Monster Raving Loony	Alan Hope	241	0.5	
Majority		8,218	15.7	
Turnout		52,305	77.5	
Conservative win (new seat)				

General election 1987: Teignbridge
Party	Candidate	Votes	%	±%
Conservative	Patrick Nicholls	30,693	53.2	−0.8
Liberal	Richard Ryder	20,268	35.1	−3.2
Labour	Justin Greenwood	6,413	11.1	+3.9
Monster Raving Loony	Alan Hope	312	0.6	+0.1
Majority		10,425	18.1	+2.4
Turnout		57,686	80.3	+2.8
Conservative hold		Swing		

=== Elections in the 1990s ===
General election 1992: Teignbridge
Party	Candidate	Votes	%	±%
Conservative	Patrick Nicholls	31,274	50.0	−3.2
Liberal Democrats	Richard Younger-Ross	22,416	35.9	+0.8
Labour	Robert A. Kennedy	8,128	13.0	+1.9
Monster Raving Loony	Alan Hope	437	0.7	+0.1
Natural Law	Nicholas J. Hayes	234	0.4	New
Majority		8,858	14.1	−4.0
Turnout		62,489	82.4	+2.1
Conservative hold		Swing	−1.9	

General election 1997: Teignbridge
Party	Candidate	Votes	%	±%
Conservative	Patrick Nicholls	24,679	39.2	−10.8
Liberal Democrats	Richard Younger-Ross	24,398	38.8	+2.9
Labour	Sue Dann	11,311	18.0	+5.0
UKIP	S. Stokes	1,601	2.5	New
Green	Nick Banwell	817	1.3	New
Rainbow Dream Ticket	Lorraine Golding	139	0.2	New
Majority		281	0.45	−13.7
Turnout		62,945	77.1	−6.3
Conservative hold		Swing	−6.9	

=== Elections in the 2000s ===
General election 2001: Teignbridge
Party	Candidate	Votes	%	±%
Liberal Democrats	Richard Younger-Ross	26,343	44.4	+5.6
Conservative	Patrick Nicholls	23,332	39.3	+0.1
Labour	Christopher Bain	7,366	12.4	−5.6
UKIP	Paul Exmouth	2,269	3.8	+1.3
Majority		3,011	5.1	
Turnout		59,310	69.3	−7.8
Liberal Democrats gain from Conservative		Swing	+2.8	

General election 2005: Teignbridge
Party	Candidate	Votes	%	±%
Liberal Democrats	Richard Younger-Ross	27,808	45.7	+1.3
Conservative	Stanley Johnson	21,593	35.5	−3.8
Labour	Chris Sherwood	6,931	11.4	−1.0
UKIP	Trevor Colman	3,881	6.4	+2.6
Liberal	Reginald Wills	685	1.1	New
Majority		6,215	10.2	+5.1
Turnout		60,898	68.7	−0.6
Liberal Democrats hold		Swing	+2.55	

== See also ==
- parliamentary constituencies in Devon
