= Colin Brown (artist) =

British painter and collage artist

Colin Brown (born 1962) is a British painter and collage artist based in Stonehaven, Scotland.

Colin Brown was born in Dundee, Scotland, in 1962. He attended Duncan of Jordanstone College of Art (1982–1987), graduating with a B.A. Honours Degree in Fine Art (Painting) 1986 and Post-Graduate Diploma in Fine Art (Painting) 1987. Brown was awarded the 1987 John Kinross Scholarship by the Royal Scottish Academy, Edinburgh to study in Florence, Italy. In 1988 he established a studio in Glasgow and worked in Düsseldorf, Germany, for four years before settling in the northeast of Scotland. In 1996 he was the recipient of a Pollock-Krasner Award from the Pollock-Krasner Foundation, New York.

Brown has exhibited internationally with major solo exhibitions in Hanover, Germany (1998), London (2010), Singapore (2013) and Scotland (2019, 2021). Described by the Press and Journal as ‘Scotland’s most prominent collage artist,’ Brown developed a unique style of painting influenced by Scottish, European and North American traditions.

Whilst still a student at Duncan of Jordanstone College of Art, Dundee, Brown discovered the Dada ideal of ‘looking at society in fragments’. Brown's early art was influenced by Scottish figurative painters of the 1980s Steven Campbell, Joyce W Cairns, Ken Currie and German artists of the interwar period including Max Beckmann and Otto Dix. The gestural brushwork and impasto of American Abstract Expressionism and sculptural paint handling of German artist Anselm Kiefer also shaped the artist's approach. 'As a student, an abandoned jute factory became the ground for three-dimensional collage works and assemblage from architectural elements'.

The art historian and critic Duncan Macmillan described Brown's collage technique as ‘combining cut out fragments of printed matter with paint, drawing, and scraps of writing. He also abrades the surface. The end result is like a multi-layered wall where graffiti and layers of poster and notices have been put up, torn down, and weathered over years.’ Brown conveys the passage of time using a wide range of traditional media, industrial paints, and recycled materials, combined with drawn and painted marks, drips and spatters.‘It’s human history, evolution, and change- that is what the work is to me.’

In 2019, Brown's series of fifteen paintings 'A Love Letter to Europe' paid homage to specific European cities, with materials gathered from each urban environment. The human history of each city, cultural icons, art history, and musical references featured in this work was intended 'to celebrate' connection to Europe's ‘diverse cultures, languages, and traditions.’

Prior to the coronavirus lockdown in 2020 Brown began work on the series Altered Redouté, a homage to the work of 18th-century Belgian botanical artist Pierre-Joseph Redouté, marking a shift in his work from urban subject matter to the natural world. Interviewed by the Press and Journal newspaper in June 2020, Brown described this body of work 'In Bloom' as 'a conversation with an artist of a different time.' 'It felt really prescient that I'd gone from urban to nature as there was more focus on nature as everyone was stuck at home and travel was banned.' 'So nature... became quite an important part of the process.' In a feature article in the international collage magazine Kolaj in 2022, the art historian and critic Georgina Coburn described the 'shift in focus' in Brown's 'In Bloom' series, 'from urban, material culture, to the nature of culture itself and what nurtures us as humans, [as] pure Zeitgeist. Where once fragments of organic imagery were accents in the composition, here they are placed centre stage.'

Colin Brown's work has featured in publications including Collage: Assembling Contemporary Art, a major overview of international collage artists edited by Blanche Craig and Cutting Edges, a survey of contemporary collage, edited by James Gallagher and Robert Klanten. Brown's work can be seen in public collections including the Highland Regional Council, Scotland, Norddeutsche Landesbank, Hanover, Germany, Grampian Arts Trust, Scotland and Hibernian Football Club, Edinburgh.
