= Newton Abbot (constituency) =

UK Parliament constituency (since 2010)

Coordinates: 50.546°N 3.497°W

- County constituency for the House of Commons
- Interactive map of boundaries since 2024
- Boundary of Newton Abbot in South West England
- County: Devon
- Electorate: 72,956 (2023)
- Major settlements: Newton Abbot, Dawlish and Teignmouth

Current constituency
- Created: 2010
- Member of Parliament: Martin Wrigley (Liberal Democrats)
- Seats: One
- Created from: Teignbridge

Newton Abbot is a constituency (Note: A county constituency (for the purposes of election expenses and type of returning officer)) in Devon represented in the House of Commons of the UK Parliament since 2024 by Martin Wrigley of the Liberal Democrats. It was previously represented since its 2010 creation by Anne Marie Morris, a Conservative. (Note: As with all constituencies, the constituency elects one Member of Parliament (MP) by the first past the post system of election at least every five years.)

== Constituency profile ==
Newton Abbot is a constituency in Devon. It is named after its largest town, Newton Abbot, which has a population of around 31,000. Other settlements in the constituency include the towns of Kingsteignton, Teignmouth and Dawlish and the villages of Bishopsteignton and Kingskerswell.

Traditionally a rural market town, Newton Abbot became an important railway town during the Industrial Revolution. Teignmouth and Dawlish are historically fishing ports that grew into popular seaside resort towns. The constituency has overall average levels of wealth, with the villages and rural areas generally being more affluent than the towns. The average house price is lower than the national and South West England averages.

The constituency has a high average age with a large retiree population. In general, residents have average levels of education and high rates of homeownership. Levels of household income and child poverty are similar to national averages. A high proportion of residents work in the retail and tourism industries and a low percentage claim unemployment benefits. White people made up 98% of the population at the 2021 census.

At the local district council, most of the constituency is represented by Liberal Democrats with some Independent councillors in Newton Abbot and Conservatives in and around Kingsteignton. At the county council, which held elections in 2025, Reform UK representatives were elected in Newton Abbot and its surroundings, whilst Teignmouth and Dawlish elected Liberal Democrats. An estimated 57% of voters in the constituency supported leaving the European Union in the 2016 referendum, higher than the nationwide figure of 52%.

== History ==
Parliament accepted the Boundary Commission's Fifth Periodic Review of Westminster constituencies proposing to create this constituency for the 2010 general election which increased the number of seats in the county from eleven to twelve.

It replaced the southern part of the former Teignbridge seat, including the town of Newton Abbot itself, as well as Dawlish and Teignmouth. Nominally, the 2010 result was a gain of the seat (LD-Conservative) on a swing of 5.8%. Teignbridge's other successor saw a very similar 6% swing, with a much larger margin for the same winning party in Central Devon at the 2010 election.

== Boundaries ==
=== 2010–2024 ===
Map of boundaries from 2010 to 2024

The District of Teignbridge electoral wards of:

- Ambrook, Bishopsteignton, Bradley, Buckland and Milber, Bushell, College, Dawlish Central and North East, Dawlish South West, Ipplepen, Kenton with Starcross, Kerswell-with-Combe, Kingsteignton East, Kingsteignton West, Shaldon and Stokeinteignhead, Teignmouth Central, Teignmouth East and Teignmouth West.

=== 2024–present ===
Further to the 2023 Periodic Review of Westminster constituencies which came into effect for the 2024 general election, the constituency is composed of the following wards of the District of Teignbridge (as they existed on 1 December 2020):

- Ambrook; Bishopsteignton; Bradley; Buckland & Milber; Bushell; College; Dawlish North East; Dawlish South West; Ipplepen; Kenton & Starcross; Kerswell-with-Combe; Kingsteignton East; Kingsteignton West; Shaldon & Stokeinteignhead; Teignmouth Central; Teignmouth East; Teignmouth West.

Very minor change to the boundary with Central Devon.

== Members of Parliament ==
Election	Member	Party
2010	Anne Marie Morris	Conservative
July 2017	Anne Marie Morris	Independent
December 2017	Anne Marie Morris	Conservative
January 2022	Anne Marie Morris	Independent
May 2022	Anne Marie Morris	Conservative
2024	Martin Wrigley	Liberal Democrats

== Elections ==
=== Elections in the 2020s ===
General election 2024: Newton Abbot
Party	Candidate	Votes	%	±%
Liberal Democrats	Martin Wrigley	15,201	31.7	+9.5
Conservative	Anne Marie Morris	12,955	27.0	−28.6
Reform	Christopher Hilditch	8,494	17.7	New
Labour	Jacob Cousens	7,115	14.8	−2.9
Green	Pauline Wynter	2,083	4.3	+1.4
Alliance	Liam Mullone	1,924	4.0	New
Heritage	Andre Sabine	116	0.2	New
Volt	Annaliese Cude	104	0.2	New
Majority		2,246	4.7	N/A
Turnout		47,992	65.0	−6.8
Registered electors		73,885		
Liberal Democrats gain from Conservative		Swing	+19.1	

=== Elections in the 2010s ===
2019 notional result
Party	Vote	%
Conservative	29,117	55.6
Liberal Democrats	11,661	22.2
Labour	9,287	17.7
Green	1,505	2.9
Others	840	1.6
Turnout	52,410	71.8
Electorate	72,956	

General election 2019: Newton Abbot
Party	Candidate	Votes	%	±%
Conservative	Anne Marie Morris	29,190	55.5	0.0
Liberal Democrats	Martin Wrigley	11,689	22.2	+1.4
Labour	James Osben	9,329	17.8	−4.4
Green	Megan Debenham	1,508	2.9	+1.1
Independent	David Halpin	840	1.6	New
Majority		17,501	33.3	0.0
Turnout		52,556	72.5	+0.5
Conservative hold		Swing		

Additionally Richard Manley stood as PPC for the Renew Party, standing down in favour of Martin Wrigley as part of the Unite to Remain pact.

General election 2017: Newton Abbot
Party	Candidate	Votes	%	±%
Conservative	Anne Marie Morris	28,735	55.5	+8.0
Labour	James Osben	11,475	22.2	+12.4
Liberal Democrats	Marie Chadwick	10,601	20.8	−3.1
Green	Kathryn Driscoll	926	1.8	−2.8
Majority		17,160	33.3	+9.7
Turnout		51,632	72.0	+3.0
Conservative hold		Swing	-2.1	

General election 2015: Newton Abbot
Party	Candidate	Votes	%	±%
Conservative	Anne Marie Morris	22,794	47.5	+4.5
Liberal Democrats	Richard Younger-Ross	11,506	23.9	−18.0
UKIP	Rod Peers	6,726	13.9	+7.5
Labour	Roy Freer	4,736	9.8	+2.8
Green	Steven Smyth-Bonfield	2,216	4.6	+3.1
TUSC	Sean Brogan	221	0.5	New
Majority		11,288	23.6	+22.5
Turnout		48,199	69.0	−0.6
Conservative hold		Swing	+11.2	

General election 2010: Newton Abbot
Party	Candidate	Votes	%	±%
Conservative	Anne Marie Morris	20,774	43.0	+8.0
Liberal Democrats	Richard Younger-Ross*	20,251	41.9	−3.6
Labour	Patrick Canavan	3,387	7.0	−4.4
UKIP	Jackie Hooper	3,088	6.4	−0.1
Green	Corinne Lindsey	701	1.5	New
Independent	Keith Sharp	82	0.2	New
Majority		523	1.1	N/A
Turnout		48,283	69.6	+0.7
Conservative gain from Liberal Democrats		Swing	+5.8	

* Served as an MP in the 2005–2010 Parliament

== See also ==
- List of parliamentary constituencies in Devon
