= Colin Brown (political journalist) =

British author and political journalist (1950–2020)

Colin Brown (8 April 1950 – 9 March 2020) was a British author and political journalist.

As a journalist, he covered breaking news in Downing Street and Westminster for more than 30 years.

He was political correspondent for The Guardian between 1979 and 1986, then held the same position at The Independent from 1986 to 2000. He then took up the role of Political Editor at The Independent on Sunday from 2002 to 2004, before being made Political Editor at The Sunday Telegraph, and then Deputy Political Editor of The Independent between 2004 and 2008. He then freelanced and lived in London.

Brown wrote the books: Fighting Talk – the biography of John Prescott (Simon & Schuster) and Prescott (Politico's), Whitehall - The Street That Shaped a Nation (Simon & Schuster), Real Britannia – Our Ten Proudest Years, the Glory and the Spin (Oneworld Publications) published in paperback as Glory and Bollocks, The Scum of the Earth – What Happened to the Real British Heroes of Waterloo? (The History Press, 2015), Operation Big - the Race to Stop Hitler's A-Bomb (Amberley Publishing, 2016), and Lady M the Life and Loves of Elizabeth, Lady Melbourne (Amberley Publishing, April 2017).

Brown died on 9 March 2020, after receiving treatment for brain cancer. He was 69.
