= 2001 United Kingdom general election in Scotland =

- 7 June 2001

All 72 Scottish seats to the House of Commons
- Turnout: 58.2% (▼13.1 pp)
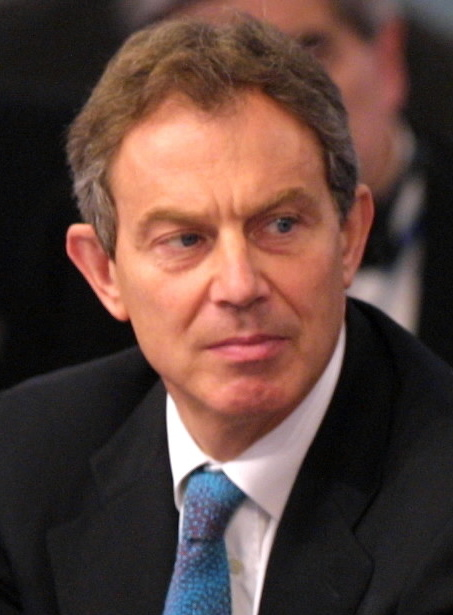

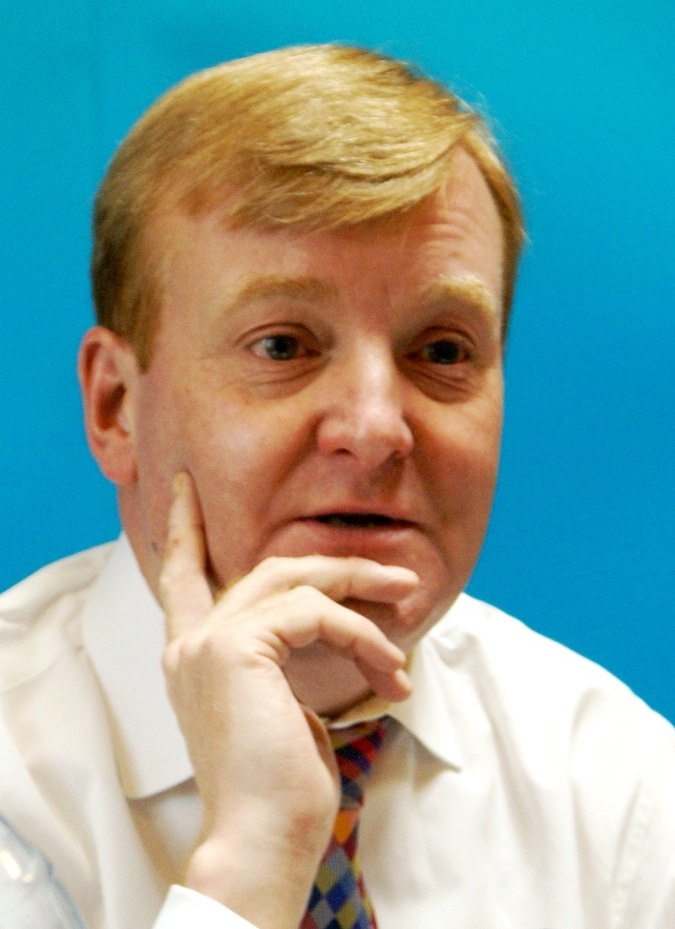

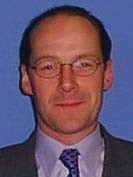

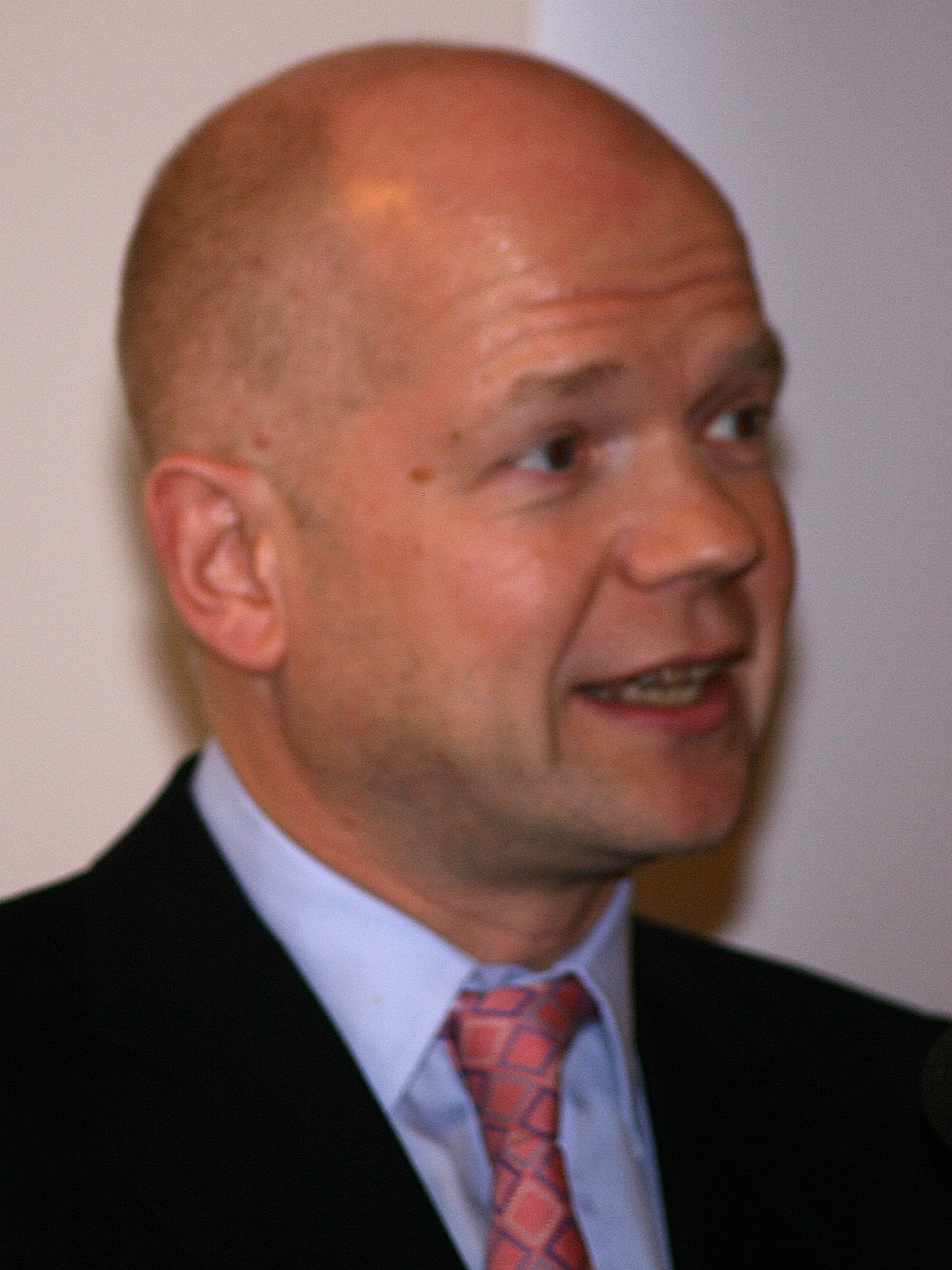
	First party	Second party
Leader	Tony Blair	Charles Kennedy
Party	Labour	Liberal Democrats
Leader since	21 July 1994	9 August 1999
Leader's seat	Sedgefield	Ross, Skye & Inverness West
Last election	56 seats, 45.6%	10 seats, 13.0%
Seats won	55	10
Seat change	▼1	Steady
Popular vote	1,001,173	378,034
Percentage	43.3%	16.3%
Swing	▼2.3 pp	▲3.3 pp
	Third party	Fourth party
Leader	John Swinney	William Hague
Party	SNP	Conservative
Leader since	23 September 2000	19 June 1997
Leader's seat	Did not stand	Richmond (Yorks)
Last election	6 seats, 22.1%	0 seats, 17.5%
Seats won	5	1
Seat change	▼1	▲1
Popular vote	464,314	360,658
Percentage	20.1%	15.6%
Swing	▼2.0 pp	▼1.9 pp

On Thursday 7 June 2001, the 2001 United Kingdom general election was held in Scotland, to elect all 659 members of the House of Commons, with 72 constituencies being in Scotland.

There was only one Scottish seat which changed parties during the election; that of Galloway and Upper Nithsdale which Peter Duncan of the Conservative Party gained from Alisdair Morgan of the Scottish National Party, by just 74 votes. Apart from the Conservatives increasing their representation to a single seat, the election was essentially a repeat of the previous result four years earlier; with Labour still the largest party in terms of seats won.

== Candidates ==
Below is a table summarising the candidates of the 2001 general election in Scotland.

Affiliation	Candidates
Scottish National Party	72
Scottish Socialist Party	72
Labour Party	71
Conservative and Unionist Party	71
Liberal Democrats	71
Socialist Labour Party	12
UK Independence Party	11
Independent	9
Scottish Green Party	4
Prolife Alliance	3
Scottish Unionist Party	2
Legalise Cannabis Alliance	2
Speaker of the House of Commons	1
Official Monster Raving Loony Party	1
Liberal Party	1
Countryside Party	1
Scottish Freedom Referendum Party	1
Rock 'n' Roll Loony Party	1
Communist Party of Britain	1
Total	407

== Outcome ==
The result saw very little change from the last contest in 1997, though after being wiped out in Scotland four years earlier, this time the Conservatives managed to win one seat. A notable feature of the election was that turnout fell to 58%, which reportedly caused all of Scotland's political parties to be "worried about voter apathy".

Although the Conservatives once again had a Scottish MP, their vote share actually fell compared with 1997 and in vote share terms they fell to fourth place. On top of this they failed to win several target seats including Edinburgh Pentlands where former MP Malcolm Rifkind failed to regain the seat and Eastwood where Labour incumbent Jim Murphy substantially increased his majority over the Scottish Conservative Chairman Raymond Robertson. The Conservatives did come close to gaining Perth where Liz Smith came within 48 votes of taking the seat from the SNP. David McLetchie, the Scottish Conservative leader, said that one seat was "better than nothing".

As well as losing Galloway and Upper Nithsdale to the Conservatives the SNP failed to take any of their target seats and saw a decline in their share of the vote, though still had the second highest vote share in Scotland. Nevertheless the former SNP leader Alex Salmond said "consolidating as the second party in Scotland is no mean achievement" and put the party in a good position for the 2003 Scottish Parliament election.

Although Labour held all its seats it also saw a decline in its vote share. In contrast the Liberal Democrats increased their vote share, though they did not win any additional seats. The new Scottish Socialist Party had set themselves what leader Tommy Sheridan called an "ambitious" target of 100,000 votes; they ultimately polled 70,000 votes. Sheridan attributed this to the significant drop in turnout compared with 1997.

== Results ==
Below is a table summarising the results of the 2001 general election in Scotland.

Party	Seats					Aggregate votes		
Party	Total	Gains	Losses	Net	Of all (%)	Total	Of all (%)	Change (%)
Labour	55	0	1	▼1	76.4	1,001,173	43.3	▼2.3
SNP	5	0	1	▼1	6.9	464,314	20.1	▼2.0
Liberal Democrats	10	0	0	Steady	13.9	378,034	16.3	▲3.3
Conservative	1	1	0	▲1	1.4	360,658	15.6	▼1.9
Scottish Socialist	0	New			—	72,516	3.1	New
Speaker	1	New		▲1	1.4	16,053	0.7	New
Green	0	0	0	Steady	—	4,551	0.2	▲0.1
Independent	0	0	0	Steady	—	3,825	0.2	Steady
UKIP	0	0	0	Steady	—	3,236	0.1	Steady
Socialist Labour	0	0	0	Steady	—	3,184	0.1	Steady
Scottish Unionist	0	New			—	2,728	0.1	New
Legalise Cannabis	0	New			—	955	0.0	New
ProLife Alliance	0	0	0	Steady	—	786	0.0	▼0.2
Monster Raving Loony	0	0	0	Steady	—	405	0.0	Steady
Liberal	0	0	0	Steady	—	383	0.0	Steady
Countryside	0	New			—	265	0.0	New
Scottish Freedom Referendum	0	New			—	250	0.0	New
Rock 'n' Roll Loony	0	New			—	211	0.0	New
Communist	0	0	0	Steady	—	174	0.0	Steady
Total	72			0	100.0	2,313,701	100.0	0.0
Registered voters, and turnout							71.3	▼13.1

2001 map of Scottish Constituencies - Results

=== Votes and seats summary ===
Popular vote
Labour	43.3%
SNP	20.1%
Liberal Democrats	16.3%
Conservative	15.6%
Socialist	3.1%
Speaker	0.7%
Other	0.9%

Parliament seats
Labour	76.4%
Liberal Democrats	13.9%
SNP	6.9%
Conservative	1.4%
Speaker	1.4%

== See also ==
- 2001 United Kingdom general election in England
- 2001 United Kingdom general election in Northern Ireland
- 2001 United Kingdom general election in Wales
- List of MPs for constituencies in Scotland (2001–2005)
