= 2001 United Kingdom general election in England =

- 7 June 2001

All 529 English seats to the House of Commons
- Turnout: 59.2% (▼12.2 pp)
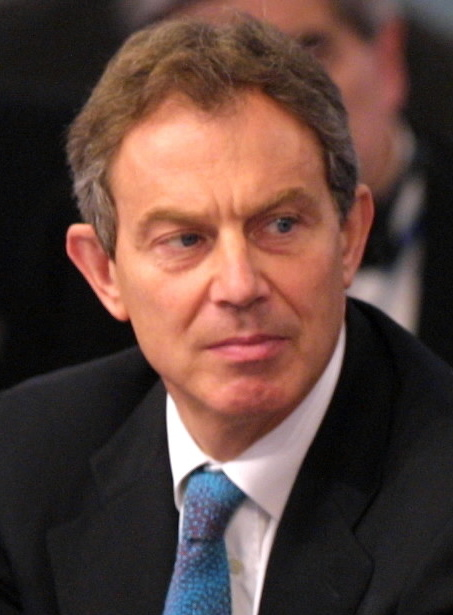

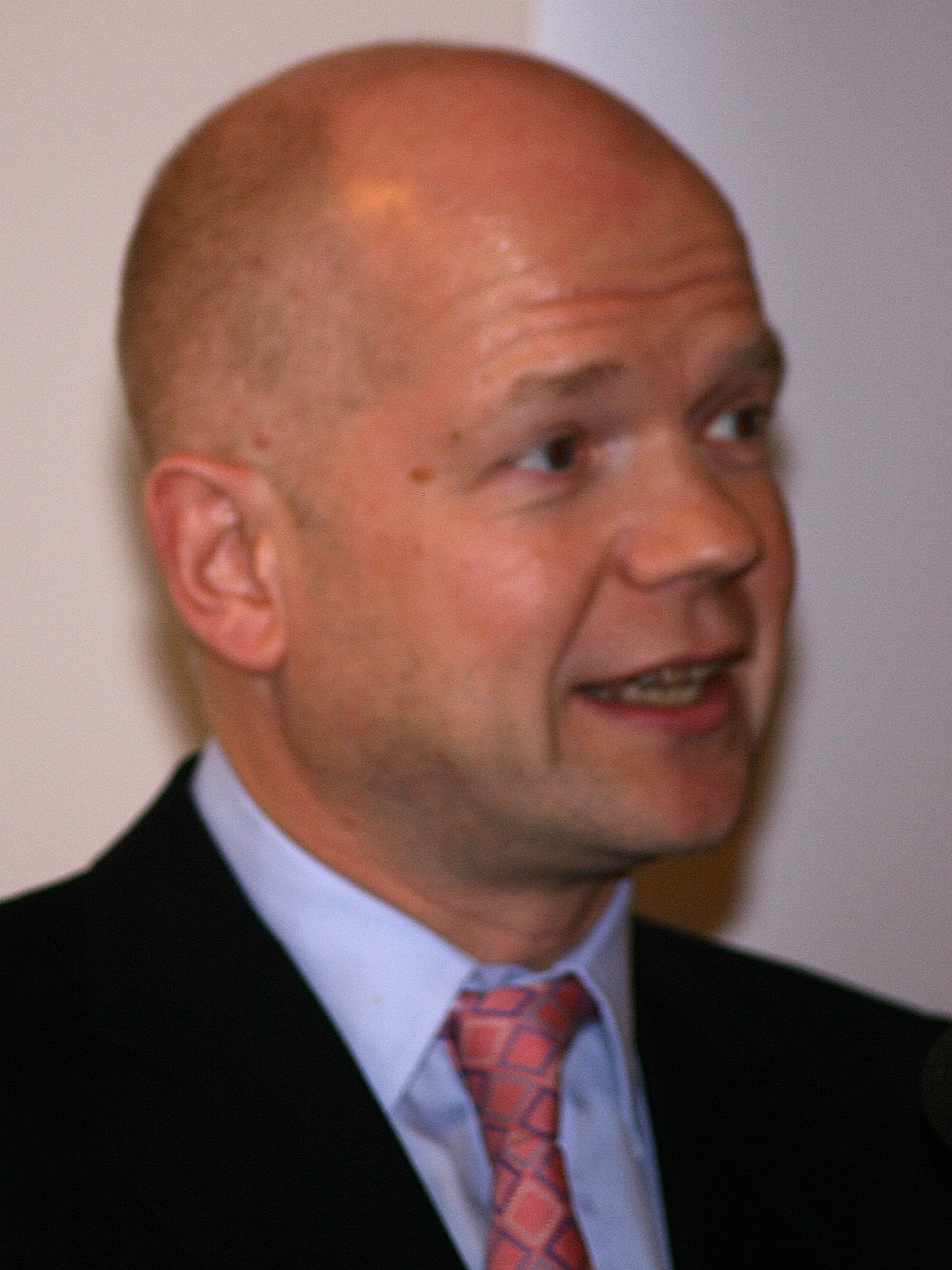

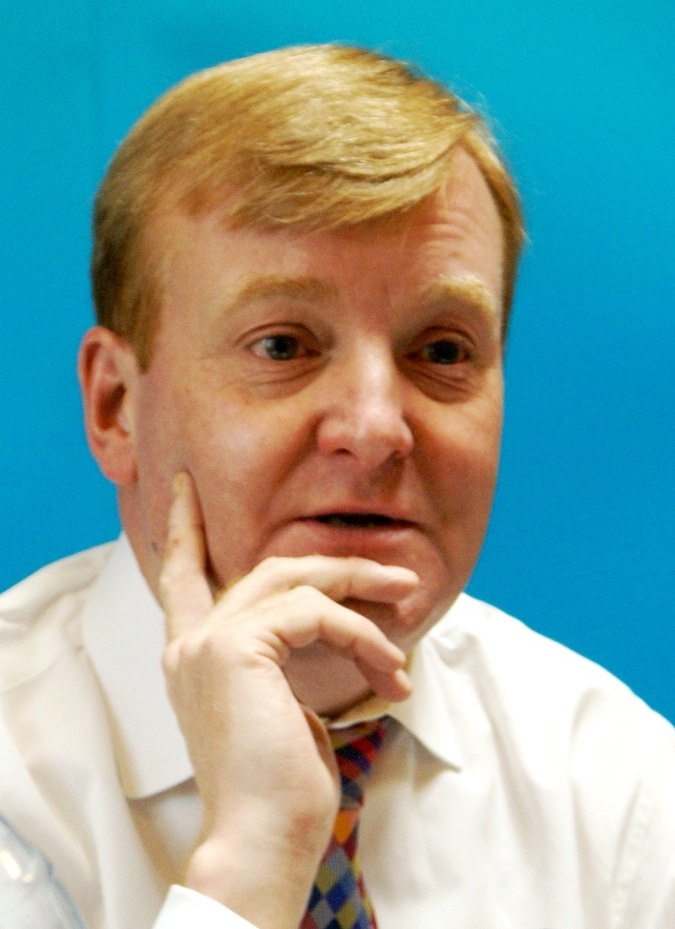
	First party	Second party	Third party
Leader	Tony Blair	William Hague	Charles Kennedy
Party	Labour	Conservative	Liberal Democrats
Leader since	21 July 1994	19 June 1997	9 August 1999
Leader's seat	Sedgefield	Richmond (Yorks)	Ross, Skye & Inverness West
Last election	328 seats, 43.5%	165 seats, 33.7%	34 seats, 17.9%
Seats won	323	165	40
Seat change	▼5	Steady	▲6
Popular vote	9,056,824	7,705,870	4,246,853
Percentage	41.4%	35.2%	19.4%
Swing	▼2.1 pp	▲1.5 pp	▲1.3 pp

On Thursday 7 June 2001, the 2001 United Kingdom general election was held in England, to elect all 659 members of the House of Commons, with 529 constituencies being in England. The Labour Party won a landslide majority of English seats for the second election in a row.

Much like the results in the rest of the United Kingdom, the results in England largely mirrored the results of the 1997 election. Labour lost only five seats in England and the Conservatives remained unchanged (losing eight seats but gaining eight). However, three of the few new MPs elected were future Conservative Prime Ministers David Cameron and Boris Johnson and future Conservative Chancellor of the Exchequer George Osborne. The party also gained back Tatton which it lost in 1997 to independent Martin Bell. Bell, however, did not contest the seat, and unsuccessfully ran as an independent candidate in Brentwood and Ongar.

The Liberal Democrats gained six seats overall, all of which were in England. The party gained five from Labour and one from the Conservatives.

Richard Taylor of Independent Kidderminster Hospital and Health Concern (also known simply as "Health Concern") secured his first election win, taking Wyre Forest from government MP, David Lock.

== Candidates ==
Below is a table summarising the candidates of the 2001 general election in England, showing parties that stood 10 or more candidates each.

Affiliation	Candidates
Conservative and Unionist Party	529
Labour Party	529
Liberal Democrats	528
UK Independence Party	392
Green Party of England and Wales	135
Independent	116
Socialist Labour Party	96
Socialist Alliance	92
British National Party	32
Prolife Alliance	27
Official Monster Raving Loony Party	14
Liberal Party	13
Legalise Cannabis Alliance	11
Others	74
Total	2,588

== Results ==
Party	Seats					Aggregate votes		
Party	Total	Gains	Losses	Net	Of all (%)	Total	Of all (%)	Change (%)
Labour	323	2	7	▼5	61.1	9,056,824	41.4	▼2.1
Conservative	165	7	7	Steady	31.2	7,705,870	35.2	▲1.5
Liberal Democrats	40	8	2	▲6	8.1	4,246,853	19.4	▲1.5
UKIP	0	0	0	Steady	—	374,775	1.7	▲1.3
Green	0	0	0	Steady	—	158,173	0.7	▲0.5
Independent	0	0	1	▼1	—	79,559	0.4	▲0.1
Socialist Alliance	0	New			-	55,295	0.3	New
Socialist Labour	0	0	0	Steady	—	51,299	0.2	▲0.1
BNP	0	0	0	Steady	—	46,851	0.2	▲0.1
Health Concern	1	New		▲1	0.2	28,487	0.1	New
Liberal	0	0	0	Steady	—	13,302	0.1	▼0.1
Legalise Cannabis	0	0	0	Steady	—	7,722	0.0	Steady
People's Justice	0	New			—	7,443	0.0	New
Prolife Alliance	0	0	0	Steady	—	7,058	0.0	▼0.1
Monster Raving Loony	0	0	0	Steady	—	6,250	0.0	Steady
Mebyon Kernow	0	0	0	Steady	—	3,199	0.0	Steady
National Front	0	0	0	Steady	—	2,484	0.0	Steady
Rock 'n' Roll Loony	0	New			—	2,423	0.0	New
Socialist	0	0	0	Steady	—	1,454	0.0	Steady
Reform 2000 Party	0	New			—	1,418	0.0	New
Isle of Wight Party	0	New			—	1,164	0.0	New
Muslim Party	0	New			—	1,150	0.0	New
New Britain	0	Did not stand in 1997			—	888	0.0	—N/a
Free Party	0	New			—	832	0.0	New
Leeds Left Alliance	0	New			—	770	0.0	New
Workers Revolutionary	0	0	0	Steady	—	607	0.0	Steady
Tatton Group	0	New			—	505	0.0	New
Grey Party	0	New			—	479	0.0	New
CPA	0	New			—	479	0.0	New
Residents and Motorists	0	New			—	460	0.0	New
Anti-Corruption Forum	0	New			—	456	0.0	New
Pro-Euro Conservative	0	New			—	454	0.0	New
Pensioner Coalition	0	New			—	453	0.0	New
Communist	0	0	0	Steady	—	445	0.0	Steady
Lower Excise Duty	0	0	0	Steady	—	391	0.0	Steady
Others	0	0	0	Steady	—	4,490	0.0	Steady
Other non-contested	0	—N/a		▼1	—	0	0.0	—N/a
Total	529			0	100.0	21,870,762	100.0	0.0
Registered voters, and turnout							59.2	▼12.2

Popular vote
Labour	41.4%
Conservative	35.2%
Liberal Democrats	19.4%
UKIP	1.7%
Green	0.7%
Other	1.5%

Parliament seats
Labour	61.1%
Conservative	31.2%
Liberal Democrats	7.6%
Other	0.2%

== By region ==
Note: the below regional vote shares, seats and changes are sourced from the BBC. The regions referenced do not exactly match the regions of England used in subsequent elections.

=== East Midlands ===
Party	Seats					Aggregate Votes		
Party	Total	Gains	Losses	Net	Of all (%)	Total	Of all (%)	Change (%)
Labour	28	0	2	▼2	63.6	879,886	45.1	▼2.7
Conservative	15	1	0	▲1	34.1	727,386	37.3	▲2.4
Liberal Democrats	1	1	0	▲1	2.3	300,831	15.4	▲1.8
UKIP	0	0	0	Steady	0.0	21,764	1.1	▲0.8
Green	0	0	0	Steady	0.0	4,865	0.2	▲0.1
Others	0	0	0	Steady	0.0	17,173	0.9	▼2.4
Total	44					1,951,905	60.9	▼12.3

=== East Anglia ===
Party	Seats					Aggregate Votes		
Party	Total	Gains	Losses	Net	Of all (%)	Total	Of all (%)	Change (%)
Conservative	14	1	1	Steady	63.6	434,774	41.7	▲3.0
Labour	7	0	1	▼1	31.8	373,397	35.8	▼2.5
Liberal Democrats	1	1	0	▲1	4.5	198,244	19.0	▲1.1
UKIP	0	0	0	Steady	0.0	22,493	2.2	▲2.0
Green	0	0	0	Steady	0.0	8,645	0.8	▲0.5
Others	0	0	0	Steady	0.0	5,385	0.5	▼4.1
Total	22					1,042,938	63.7	▼10.7

=== Greater London ===
Party	Seats					Aggregate Votes		
Party	Total	Gains	Losses	Net	Of all (%)	Total	Of all (%)	Change (%)
Labour	55	0	2	▼2	74.3	1,306,869	47.3	▼2.2
Conservative	13	2	0	▲2	17.6	841,751	30.5	▼0.7
Liberal Democrats	6	0	0	Steady	8.1	482,888	17.5	▲2.9
Green	0	0	0	Steady	0.0	45,933	1.7	▲1.3
UKIP	0	0	0	Steady	0.0	26,433	1.0	▲0.7
Others	0	0	0	Steady	0.0	56,490	2.0	▼2.0
Total	74					2,760,364	55.2	▼12.4

Greater London

=== North East England ===
Party	Seats					Aggregate Votes		
Party	Total	Gains	Losses	Net	Of all (%)	Total	Of all (%)	Change (%)
Labour	32	0	0	Steady	88.9	746,012	55.7	▼5.2
Conservative	3	0	0	Steady	8.3	329,965	24.6	▲2.4
Liberal Democrats	1	0	0	Steady	2.8	229,560	17.1	▲3.8
UKIP	0	0	0	Steady	0.0	10,799	0.8	▲0.6
Green	0	0	0	Steady	0.0	3,583	0.3	▲0.2
Others	0	0	0	Steady	0.0	19,635	1.5	▼1.8
Total	36					1,339,554	57.6	▼11.8

=== North West England ===
Party	Seats					Aggregate Votes		
Party	Total	Gains	Losses	Net	Of all (%)	Total	Of all (%)	Change (%)
Labour	60	0	0	Steady	85.7	1,375,509	51.8	▼2.4
Conservative	7	1	1	Steady	10.0	752,483	28.3	▲1.2
Liberal Democrats	3	1	0	▲1	4.3	438,526	16.5	▲2.2
UKIP	0	0	0	Steady	0.0	23,013	0.9	▲0.8
Green	0	0	0	Steady	0.0	11,410	0.4	▲0.3
Others	0	0	1	▼1	0.0	56,001	2.1	▼2.1
Total	70					2,656,942	55.3	▼14.6

=== South East England ===
Party	Seats					Aggregate Votes		
Party	Total	Gains	Losses	Net	Of all (%)	Total	Of all (%)	Change (%)
Conservative	73	2	2	Steady	62.4	2,209,050	42.6	▲1.2
Labour	35	0	1	▼1	29.9	1,643,314	31.7	▼0.2
Liberal Democrats	9	2	1	▲1	7.7	1,121,385	21.6	▲0.2
UKIP	0	0	0	Steady	0.0	126,431	2.4	▲1.7
Green	0	0	0	Steady	0.0	35,629	0.7	▲0.4
Others	0	0	0	Steady	0.0	51,902	1.0	▼3.3
Total	117					5,187,711	61.3	▼12.4

=== South West England ===
Party	Seats					Aggregate Votes		
Party	Total	Gains	Losses	Net	Of all (%)	Total	Of all (%)	Change (%)
Conservative	20	1	3	▼2	39.2	946,629	38.5	▲1.8
Liberal Democrats	15	2	1	▲1	29.4	765,824	31.2	▼0.1
Labour	16	1	0	▲1	31.4	645,121	26.3	▼0.1
UKIP	0	0	0	Steady	0.0	60,590	2.5	▲1.6
Green	0	0	0	Steady	0.0	19,770	0.8	▲0.4
Others	0	0	0	Steady	0.0	18,415	0.7	▼3.6
Total	51					2,456,349	64.9	▼10.1

=== West Midlands ===
Party	Seats					Aggregate Votes		
Party	Total	Gains	Losses	Net	Of all (%)	Total	Of all (%)	Change (%)
Labour	43	0	1	▼1	72.9	1,049,244	44.8	▼3.0
Conservative	13	0	1	▼1	22.0	818,749	35.0	▲1.3
Liberal Democrats	2	1	0	▲1	3.4	343,929	14.7	▲0.9
UKIP	0	0	0	Steady	0.0	43,203	1.8	▲1.6
Health Concern	1	New		▲1	1.7	28,487	1.2	New
Green	0	0	0	Steady	0.0	9,732	0.4	▲0.2
Others	0	0	0	Steady	0.0	47,037	2.0	▼1.0
Total	59					2,340,381	58.5	▼12.4

=== Yorkshire and the Humber ===
Party	Seats					Aggregate Votes		
Party	Total	Gains	Losses	Net	Of all (%)	Total	Of all (%)	Change (%)
Labour	47	0	0	Steady	83.9	1,037,114	48.6	▼3.3
Conservative	7	0	0	Steady	12.5	644,802	30.2	▲2.2
Liberal Democrats	2	0	0	Steady	3.6	365,662	17.1	▲1.1
UKIP	0	0	0	Steady	0.0	40,061	1.9	▲1.7
Green	0	0	0	Steady	0.0	18,616	0.9	▲0.6
Others	0	0	0	Steady	0.0	27,730	1.2	▼2.3
Total	56					2,133,985	56.7	▼11.6

== By county ==
The below tables summarise the results by county as used by the Boundary Commission for England after the fourth periodic boundary review for Westminster constituencies in England.

=== Avon ===
Party	Seats					Aggregate votes		
Party	Total	Gains	Losses	Net	Of all (%)	Total	Of all (%)	Change (%)
Labour	6	0	0	Steady	60.0	177,782	36.8	▲0.3
Liberal Democrats	3	0	0	Steady	30.0	134,170	27.8	▲1.4
Conservative	1	0	0	Steady	10.0	152,030	31.5	▼1.2
Others	0	0	0	Steady	0.0	19,185	4.0	▼0.5
Total	10					483,167	64.2	▼10.9

=== Bedfordshire ===
Party	Seats					Aggregate votes		
Party	Total	Gains	Losses	Net	Of all (%)	Total	Of all (%)	Change (%)
Labour	3	0	0	Steady	50.0	109,113	42.8	▼1.1
Conservative	3	0	0	Steady	50.0	100,265	39.4	▲0.8
Liberal Democrats	0	0	0	Steady	0.0	37,599	14.8	▲1.9
Others	0	0	0	Steady	0.0	7,817	3.1	▼1.6
Total	6					254,794	60.9	▼13.9

=== Berkshire ===
Party	Seats					Aggregate votes		
Party	Total	Gains	Losses	Net	Of all (%)	Total	Of all (%)	Change (%)
Conservative	4	0	0	Steady	50.0	142,280	40.2	▼2.0
Labour	3	0	0	Steady	37.5	108,675	30.7	▲2.2
Liberal Democrats	1	0	0	Steady	12.5	91,964	26.0	▲1.4
Others	0	0	0	Steady	0.0	11,002	3.1	▼1.6
Total	8					353,921	60.2	▼12.7

=== Buckinghamshire ===
Party	Seats					Aggregate votes		
Party	Total	Gains	Losses	Net	Of all (%)	Total	Of all (%)	Change (%)
Conservative	5	0	0	Steady	71.4	145,128	45.5	▲1.8
Labour	2	0	0	Steady	28.6	98,165	30.7	▲0.1
Liberal Democrats	0	0	0	Steady	0.0	63,221	19.8	▼1.4
Others	0	0	0	Steady	0.0	12,724	4.0	▼0.6
Total	7					319,238	63.3	▼10.1

=== Cambridgeshire ===
Party	Seats					Aggregate votes		
Party	Total	Gains	Losses	Net	Of all (%)	Total	Of all (%)	Change (%)
Conservative	5	0	0	Steady	71.4	138,798	42.8	▲0.8
Labour	2	0	0	Steady	28.6	104,506	32.3	▼2.2
Liberal Democrats	0	0	0	Steady	0.0	68,824	21.2	▲3.4
Others	0	0	0	Steady	0.0	11,843	3.7	▼1.9
Total	7					323,971	62.2	▼11.6

=== Cheshire ===
Party	Seats					Aggregate votes		
Party	Total	Gains	Losses	Net	Of all (%)	Total	Of all (%)	Change (%)
Labour	7	0	0	Steady	63.6	214,236	46.3	▼0.2
Conservative	4	0	0	▲1	36.4	164,470	35.6	▲2.2
Liberal Democrats	0	0	0	Steady	0.0	72,118	15.6	▲3.3
Others	0	0	0	▼1	0.0	11,609	2.5	▼5.3
Total	11					462,433	60.4	▼14.4

=== Cleveland ===
Party	Seats					Aggregate votes		
Party	Total	Gains	Losses	Net	Of all (%)	Total	Of all (%)	Change (%)
Labour	6	0	0	Steady	100.0	138,520	46.3	▼3.1
Conservative	0	0	0	Steady	0.0	61,092	26.2	▲1.0
Liberal Democrats	0	0	0	Steady	0.0	28,966	12.4	▲2.6
Others	0	0	0	Steady	0.0	5,015	2.1	▼0.5
Total	6					233,593	56.9	▼13.6

=== Cornwall ===
Party	Seats					Aggregate votes		
Party	Total	Gains	Losses	Net	Of all (%)	Total	Of all (%)	Change (%)
Liberal Democrats	4	0	0	Steady	80.0	113,000	44.8	▲0.9
Labour	1	0	0	Steady	20.0	43,674	17.3	▲0.2
Conservative	0	0	0	Steady	0.0	82,227	32.6	▲2.3
Others	0	0	0	Steady	0.0	13,216	5.2	▼3.4
Total	5					252,117	64.6	▼10.0

=== County Durham ===
Party	Seats					Aggregate votes		
Party	Total	Gains	Losses	Net	Of all (%)	Total	Of all (%)	Change (%)
Labour	7	0	0	Steady	100.0	170,329	62.9	▼5.7
Conservative	0	0	0	Steady	0.0	55,254	20.4	▲2.8
Liberal Democrats	0	0	0	Steady	0.0	38,533	14.2	▲4.5
Others	0	0	0	Steady	0.0	6,890	2.5	▼1.6
Total	7					271,006	58.6	▼11.5

=== Cumbria ===
Party	Seats					Aggregate votes		
Party	Total	Gains	Losses	Net	Of all (%)	Total	Of all (%)	Change (%)
Labour	4	0	0	Steady	66.7	94,191	38.8	▼7.0
Conservative	2	0	0	Steady	33.3	96,163	39.6	▲6.1
Liberal Democrats	0	0	0	Steady	0.0	46,736	19.3	▲2.7
Others	0	0	0	Steady	0.0	5,563	2.3	▼1.8
Total	6					242,653	63.5	▼10.4

=== Derbyshire ===
Party	Seats					Aggregate votes		
Party	Total	Gains	Losses	Net	Of all (%)	Total	Of all (%)	Change (%)
Labour	8	0	0	▼1	80.0	227,768	50.0	▼3.6
Conservative	1	0	0	Steady	10.0	141,717	31.1	▲1.6
Liberal Democrats	1	0	0	▲1	10.0	79,845	17.5	▲3.7
Others	0	0	0	Steady	0.0	6,392	1.4	▼1.7
Total	10					455,722	60.9	▼13.7

=== Devon ===
Party	Seats					Aggregate votes		
Party	Total	Gains	Losses	Net	Of all (%)	Total	Of all (%)	Change (%)
Conservative	4	0	0	▼1	36.4	212,576	39.0	▲2.2
Liberal Democrats	4	0	0	▲1	36.4	173,639	31.9	▲0.6
Labour	3	0	0	Steady	27.3	128,599	23.6	▼2.3
Others	0	0	0	Steady	0.0	30,182	5.5	▼0.5
Total	11					544,996	65.6	▼9.6

=== Dorset ===
Party	Seats					Aggregate votes		
Party	Total	Gains	Losses	Net	Of all (%)	Total	Of all (%)	Change (%)
Conservative	6	0	0	▼2	75.0	156,222	45.3	▲3.5
Liberal Democrats	1	0	0	▲1	12.5	108,426	31.5	▼2.6
Labour	1	0	0	▲1	12.5	72,715	21.1	▲2.3
Others	0	0	0	Steady	0.0	7,339	2.1	▼3.2
Total	8					344,702	63.6	▼10.0

=== East Sussex ===
Party	Seats					Aggregate votes		
Party	Total	Gains	Losses	Net	Of all (%)	Total	Of all (%)	Change (%)
Labour	4	0	0	▲1	50.0	105,937	30.2	▲1.0
Conservative	3	0	0	▼2	37.5	138,652	39.5	▲0.1
Liberal Democrats	1	0	0	▲1	12.5	84,232	24.0	Steady
Others	0	0	0	Steady	0.0	22,053	6.3	▼1.1
Total	8					350,874	61.2	▼11.4

=== Essex ===
Party	Seats					Aggregate votes		
Party	Total	Gains	Losses	Net	Of all (%)	Total	Of all (%)	Change (%)
Conservative	11	0	0	▲1	64.7	315,589	42.8	▲2.5
Labour	5	0	0	▼1	29.4	255,526	34.7	▼1.8
Liberal Democrats	1	0	0	Steady	5.9	122,663	16.7	▼1.6
Others	0	0	0	Steady	0.0	42,887	5.8	▲0.8
Total	17					736,665	59.5	▼13.3

=== Gloucestershire ===
Party	Seats					Aggregate votes		
Party	Total	Gains	Losses	Net	Of all (%)	Total	Of all (%)	Change (%)
Labour	3	0	0	▲1	50.0	94,693	33.7	▼0.3
Conservative	2	0	0	▼2	33.3	114,812	40.9	▲1.4
Liberal Democrats	1	0	0	▲1	16.7	61,656	21.9	▼0.6
Others	0	0	0	Steady	0.0	9,855	3.5	▼0.4
Total	6					281,016	64.9	▼11.2

=== Greater London ===
Party	Seats					Aggregate votes		
Party	Total	Gains	Losses	Net	Of all (%)	Total	Of all (%)	Change (%)
Labour	55	0	0	▼2	74.3	1,307,229	47.4	▼2.1
Conservative	13	0	0	▲2	17.6	841,751	30.5	▼0.7
Liberal Democrats	6	0	0	Steady	8.1	482,888	17.5	▲2.9
Others	0	0	0	Steady	0.0	128,855	4.7	Steady
Total	74					2,760,723	55.3	▼12.3

=== Greater Manchester ===
Party	Seats					Aggregate votes		
Party	Total	Gains	Losses	Net	Of all (%)	Total	Of all (%)	Change (%)
Labour	25	0	0	Steady	89.3	540,982	53.7	▼2.7
Liberal Democrats	2	0	0	▲1	7.1	184,334	18.3	▲2.2
Conservative	1	0	0	▼1	3.6	245,361	24.3	▲0.2
Others	0	0	0	Steady	0.0	37,573	3.7	▲0.3
Total	28					1,008,250	52.9	▼14.9

=== Hampshire ===
Party	Seats					Aggregate votes		
Party	Total	Gains	Losses	Net	Of all (%)	Total	Of all (%)	Change (%)
Conservative	10	0	0	▼1	58.8	316,520	41.5	▲0.3
Liberal Democrats	4	0	0	▲1	23.5	211,595	27.8	▲2.4
Labour	3	0	0	Steady	17.6	210,610	27.6	▼0.7
Others	0	0	0	Steady	0.0	23,583	3.1	▼2.0
Total	17					762,308	60.9	▼12.0

=== Herefordshire and Worcestershire ===
Party	Seats					Aggregate votes		
Party	Total	Gains	Losses	Net	Of all (%)	Total	Of all (%)	Change (%)
Conservative	4	0	0	Steady	50.0	146,806	41.1	▲0.1
Labour	2	0	0	▼1	25.0	97,932	27.4	▼5.2
Liberal Democrats	1	0	0	Steady	12.5	69,215	19.4	▼2.5
Others	1	0	0	▲1	12.5	43,092	12.1	▲7.5
Total	8					357,045	65.1	▼10.3

=== Hertfordshire ===
Party	Seats					Aggregate votes		
Party	Total	Gains	Losses	Net	Of all (%)	Total	Of all (%)	Change (%)
Conservative	6	0	0	Steady	54.5	202,569	41.8	▲1.2
Labour	5	0	0	▼1	45.5	188,308	38.9	▼0.8
Liberal Democrats	0	0	0	Steady	0.0	81,899	16.9	▲0.9
Others	0	0	0	▲1	0.0	11,878	2.5	▼1.3
Total	11					484,654	62.6	▼13.3

=== Humberside ===
Party	Seats					Aggregate votes		
Party	Total	Gains	Losses	Net	Of all (%)	Total	Of all (%)	Change (%)
Labour	7	0	0	Steady	70.0	173,958	46.7	▼3.6
Conservative	3	0	0	Steady	30.0	122,005	32.8	▲2.4
Liberal Democrats	0	0	0	Steady	0.0	63,664	17.1	▲1.3
Others	0	0	0	Steady	0.0	12,528	3.4	Steady
Total	10					372,155	56.3	▼11.2

=== Isle of Wight ===
Party	Seats					Aggregate votes		
Party	Total	Gains	Losses	Net	Of all (%)	Total	Of all (%)	Change (%)
Conservative	1	0	0	▲1	100.0	25,223	39.7	▲5.7
Liberal Democrats	0	0	0	▼1	0.0	22,397	35.3	▼7.5
Labour	0	0	0	Steady	0.0	9,676	15.2	▲2.1
Others	0	0	0	Steady	0.0	6,186	9.7	▼0.3
Total	1					63,482	60.8	▼11.2

=== Kent ===
Party	Seats					Aggregate votes		
Party	Total	Gains	Losses	Net	Of all (%)	Total	Of all (%)	Change (%)
Conservative	9	0	0	Steady	52.9	314,496	43.4	▲3.0
Labour	8	0	0	Steady	47.1	272,877	37.7	▲0.6
Liberal Democrats	0	0	0	Steady	0.0	112,024	15.5	▼1.6
Others	0	0	0	Steady	0.0	24,460	3.4	▼2.0
Total	17					723,857	61.5	▼12.0

=== Lancashire ===
Party	Seats					Aggregate votes		
Party	Total	Gains	Losses	Net	Of all (%)	Total	Of all (%)	Change (%)
Labour	13	0	0	Steady	86.7	298,739	46.7	▼2.5
Conservative	2	0	0	Steady	13.3	232,940	36.4	▲2.3
Liberal Democrats	0	0	0	Steady	0.0	84,827	13.3	▲0.6
Others	0	0	0	Steady	0.0	22,618	3.5	▼0.4
Total	15					639,124	59.1	▼13.1

=== Leicestershire and Rutland ===
Party	Seats					Aggregate votes		
Party	Total	Gains	Losses	Net	Of all (%)	Total	Of all (%)	Change (%)
Labour	5	0	0	Steady	50.0	182,290	41.5	▼2.4
Conservative	5	0	0	Steady	50.0	167,748	38.1	▲1.4
Liberal Democrats	0	0	0	Steady	0.0	74,964	17.0	▲1.9
Others	0	0	0	Steady	0.0	14,776	3.4	▼0.9
Total	10					439,778	62.2	▼11.3

=== Lincolnshire ===
Party	Seats					Aggregate votes		
Party	Total	Gains	Losses	Net	Of all (%)	Total	Of all (%)	Change (%)
Conservative	6	0	0	Steady	85.7	141,109	46.2	▲3.8
Labour	1	0	0	Steady	14.3	109,150	35.7	▼1.2
Liberal Democrats	0	0	0	Steady	0.0	49,225	16.1	▼1.4
Others	0	0	0	Steady	0.0	5,943	1.9	▼1.2
Total	7					305,427	61.4	▼11.0

=== Merseyside ===
Party	Seats					Aggregate votes		
Party	Total	Gains	Losses	Net	Of all (%)	Total	Of all (%)	Change (%)
Labour	15	0	0	Steady	93.8	321,552	53.7	▼3.1
Liberal Democrats	1	0	0	Steady	6.2	97,247	17.8	▲3.3
Conservative	0	0	0	Steady	0.0	109,965	20.1	▲0.3
Others	0	0	0	Steady	0.0	18,624	3.4	▼0.5
Total	16					547,388	51.9	▼15.7

=== Norfolk ===
Party	Seats					Aggregate votes		
Party	Total	Gains	Losses	Net	Of all (%)	Total	Of all (%)	Change (%)
Conservative	4	0	0	Steady	50.0	165,174	41.6	▲4.8
Labour	3	0	0	▼1	37.5	141,129	35.5	▼4.4
Liberal Democrats	1	0	0	▲1	12.5	78,050	19.6	▲1.4
Others	0	0	0	Steady	0.0	13,068	3.3	▼1.9
Total	8					397,421	64.1	▼10.8

=== Northamptonshire ===
Party	Seats					Aggregate votes		
Party	Total	Gains	Losses	Net	Of all (%)	Total	Of all (%)	Change (%)
Labour	5	0	0	Steady	83.3	131,835	43.8	▼1.3
Conservative	1	0	0	Steady	16.7	123,986	41.2	▲0.8
Liberal Democrats	0	0	0	Steady	0.0	37,831	12.6	▲1.4
Others	0	0	0	Steady	0.0	7,535	2.5	▼0.9
Total	6					301,187	63.1	▼11.3

=== Northumberland ===
Party	Seats					Aggregate votes		
Party	Total	Gains	Losses	Net	Of all (%)	Total	Of all (%)	Change (%)
Labour	2	0	0	Steady	50.0	65,067	43.2	▼5.5
Liberal Democrats	1	0	0	Steady	25.0	41,986	27.9	▲3.4
Conservative	1	0	0	Steady	25.0	39,368	26.1	▲2.9
Others	0	0	0	Steady	0.0	4,269	3.4	▼0.8
Total	4					150,690	62.0	▼10.8

=== North Yorkshire ===
Party	Seats					Aggregate votes		
Party	Total	Gains	Losses	Net	Of all (%)	Total	Of all (%)	Change (%)
Conservative	4	0	0	Steady	50.0	162,679	43.6	▲3.6
Labour	3	0	0	Steady	37.5	110,412	29.6	▼3.2
Liberal Democrats	1	0	0	Steady	12.5	87,841	23.5	▲0.5
Others	0	0	0	Steady	0.0	12,571	3.4	▼0.8
Total	8					373,503	64.5	▼9.4

=== Nottinghamshire ===
Party	Seats					Aggregate votes		
Party	Total	Gains	Losses	Net	Of all (%)	Total	Of all (%)	Change (%)
Labour	9	0	0	▼1	81.8	228,843	50.9	▼3.5
Conservative	2	0	0	▲1	18.2	152,826	34.0	▲3.4
Liberal Democrats	0	0	0	Steady	0.0	58,966	13.1	▲2.3
Others	0	0	0	Steady	0.0	9,153	2.0	▼2.2
Total	11					449,788	57.5	▼14.0

=== Oxfordshire ===
Party	Seats					Aggregate votes		
Party	Total	Gains	Losses	Net	Of all (%)	Total	Of all (%)	Change (%)
Conservative	4	0	0	Steady	66.7	108,296	37.9	▼0.1
Labour	1	0	0	Steady	16.7	84,269	29.5	▼2.2
Liberal Democrats	1	0	0	Steady	16.7	78,007	27.3	▲2.6
Others	0	0	0	Steady	0.0	15,092	5.3	▼0.3
Total	6					285,664	62.7	▼13.0

=== Shropshire ===
Party	Seats					Aggregate votes		
Party	Total	Gains	Losses	Net	Of all (%)	Total	Of all (%)	Change (%)
Labour	3	0	0	Steady	60.0	80,814	38.1	▼1.5
Conservative	1	0	0	▼1	20.0	82,711	39.0	▲1.9
Liberal Democrats	1	0	0	▲1	20.6	39,459	18.6	▼1.9
Others	0	0	0	Steady	0.0	8,934	4.2	▲1.6
Total	5					211,918	62.8	▼10.2

=== Somerset ===
Party	Seats					Aggregate votes		
Party	Total	Gains	Losses	Net	Of all (%)	Total	Of all (%)	Change (%)
Conservative	3	0	0	▲1	60.0	104,502	40.9	▲4.4
Liberal Democrats	2	0	0	▼1	40.0	101,080	39.6	▼1.0
Labour	0	0	0	Steady	0.0	42,162	16.5	▼0.9
Others	0	0	0	Steady	0.0	7,458	2.9	▼2.5
Total	5					255,202	67.0	▼8.8

=== South Yorkshire ===
Party	Seats					Aggregate votes		
Party	Total	Gains	Losses	Net	Of all (%)	Total	Of all (%)	Change (%)
Labour	14	0	0	Steady	93.3	296,403	58.9	▼3.3
Liberal Democrats	1	0	0	Steady	6.7	90,624	18.0	▲1.4
Conservative	0	0	0	Steady	0.0	94,503	18.8	▲2.1
Others	0	0	0	Steady	0.0	21,282	4.2	▼0.2
Total	15					502,812	52.7	▼11.5

=== Staffordshire ===
Party	Seats					Aggregate votes		
Party	Total	Gains	Losses	Net	Of all (%)	Total	Of all (%)	Change (%)
Labour	9	0	0	Steady	75.0	229,216	48.0	▼3.3
Conservative	3	0	0	Steady	25.0	171,461	35.9	▲2.2
Liberal Democrats	0	0	0	Steady	0.0	59,678	12.5	▲1.8
Others	0	0	0	Steady	0.0	17,086	3.6	▼0.6
Total	12					477,441	59.0	▼14.1

=== Suffolk ===
Party	Seats					Aggregate votes		
Party	Total	Gains	Losses	Net	Of all (%)	Total	Of all (%)	Change (%)
Conservative	5	0	0	Steady	71.4	130,802	40.7	▲3.0
Labour	2	0	0	Steady	28.6	127,762	39.7	▼0.4
Liberal Democrats	0	0	0	Steady	0.0	51,370	16.0	▼1.6
Others	0	0	0	Steady	0.0	11,612	3.6	▼1.0
Total	7					321,546	62.9	▼11.7

=== Surrey ===
Party	Seats					Aggregate votes		
Party	Total	Gains	Losses	Net	Of all (%)	Total	Of all (%)	Change (%)
Conservative	10	0	0	▼1	90.9	236,024	47.6	▲1.4
Liberal Democrats	1	0	0	▲1	9.1	133,636	27.0	▲2.5
Labour	0	0	0	Steady	0.0	107,897	21.8	▼0.5
Others	0	0	0	Steady	0.0	17,878	3.6	▼3.4
Total	11					495,435	62.4	▼12.2

=== Tyne and Wear ===
Party	Seats					Aggregate votes		
Party	Total	Gains	Losses	Net	Of all (%)	Total	Of all (%)	Change (%)
Labour	13	0	0	Steady	100.0	277,905	62.9	▼4.2
Conservative	0	0	0	Steady	0.0	78,088	17.7	▲0.4
Liberal Democrats	0	0	0	Steady	0.0	73,339	16.6	▲4.8
Others	0	0	0	Steady	0.0	12,280	2.8	▼1.0
Total	13					441,612	53.4	▼12.2

=== Warwickshire ===
Party	Seats					Aggregate votes		
Party	Total	Gains	Losses	Net	Of all (%)	Total	Of all (%)	Change (%)
Labour	4	0	0	Steady	80.0	106,093	42.4	▼1.4
Conservative	1	0	0	Steady	20.0	98,531	39.4	▲0.7
Liberal Democrats	0	0	0	Steady	0.0	39,084	15.6	▲1.7
Others	0	0	0	Steady	0.0	6,262	2.5	▼1.1
Total	5					249,970	63.9	▼11.7

=== West Midlands (county) ===
Party	Seats					Aggregate votes		
Party	Total	Gains	Losses	Net	Of all (%)	Total	Of all (%)	Change (%)
Labour	25	0	0	▲1	86.2	535,187	51.3	▼0.2
Conservative	4	0	0	Steady	13.8	319,267	30.6	▲0.8
Liberal Democrats	0	0	0	Steady	0.0	136,493	13.1	▲1.7
Others	0	0	0	▼1	0.0	53,085	5.1	▼2.3
Total	29					1,044,032	54.7	▼12.7

=== West Sussex ===
Party	Seats					Aggregate votes		
Party	Total	Gains	Losses	Net	Of all (%)	Total	Of all (%)	Change (%)
Conservative	7	0	0	Steady	87.5	164,009	46.0	▲1.3
Labour	1	0	0	Steady	12.5	92,261	25.9	▲1.6
Liberal Democrats	0	0	0	Steady	0.0	82,152	23.0	▼2.6
Others	0	0	0	Steady	0.0	18,405	5.2	▼0.3
Total	8					356,827	61.3	▼12.5

=== West Yorkshire ===
Party	Seats					Aggregate votes		
Party	Total	Gains	Losses	Net	Of all (%)	Total	Of all (%)	Change (%)
Labour	23	0	0	Steady	100.0	456,341	51.5	▼2.5
Conservative	0	0	0	Steady	0.0	265,615	30.0	▲1.2
Liberal Democrats	0	0	0	Steady	0.0	123,533	14.0	▲1.0
Others	0	0	0	Steady	0.0	40,026	4.5	▼0.3
Total	23					885,515	56.7	▼12.6

=== Wiltshire ===
Party	Seats					Aggregate votes		
Party	Total	Gains	Losses	Net	Of all (%)	Total	Of all (%)	Change (%)
Conservative	4	0	0	Steady	66.7	124,260	42.1	▲1.9
Labour	2	0	0	Steady	33.3	85,496	29.0	▲1.0
Liberal Democrats	0	0	0	Steady	0.0	73,853	25.0	▼1.2
Others	0	0	0	Steady	0.0	11,531	3.9	▼1.7
Total	6					295,140	64.4	▼10.0

== See also ==
- 2001 United Kingdom general election in Northern Ireland
- 2001 United Kingdom general election in Scotland
- 2001 United Kingdom general election in Wales
