= 2001 United Kingdom general election in Wales =

- 7 June 2001

All 40 Welsh seats to the House of Commons
- Turnout: 61.6% (▼11.9 pp)
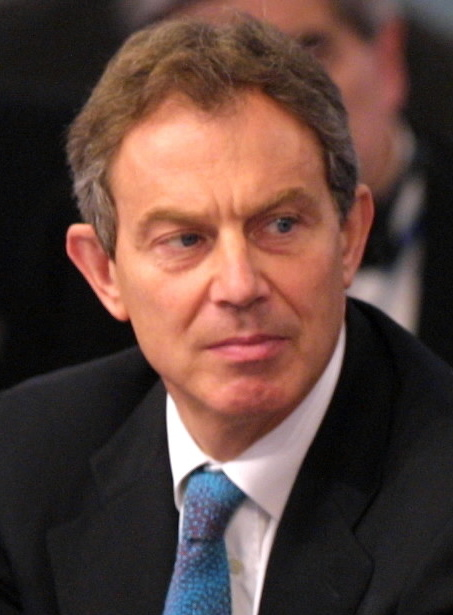

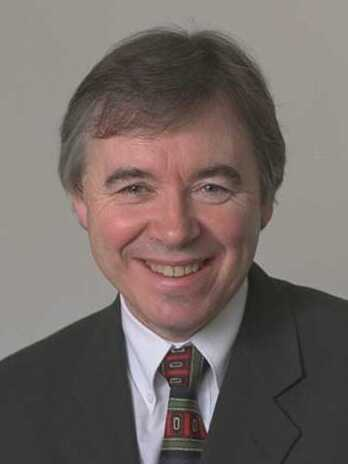

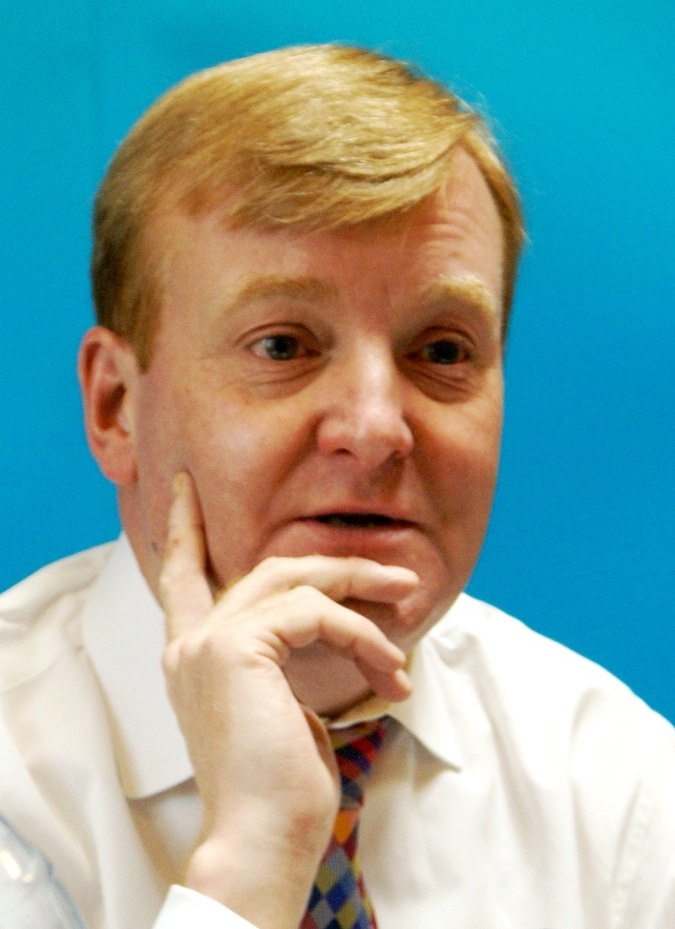

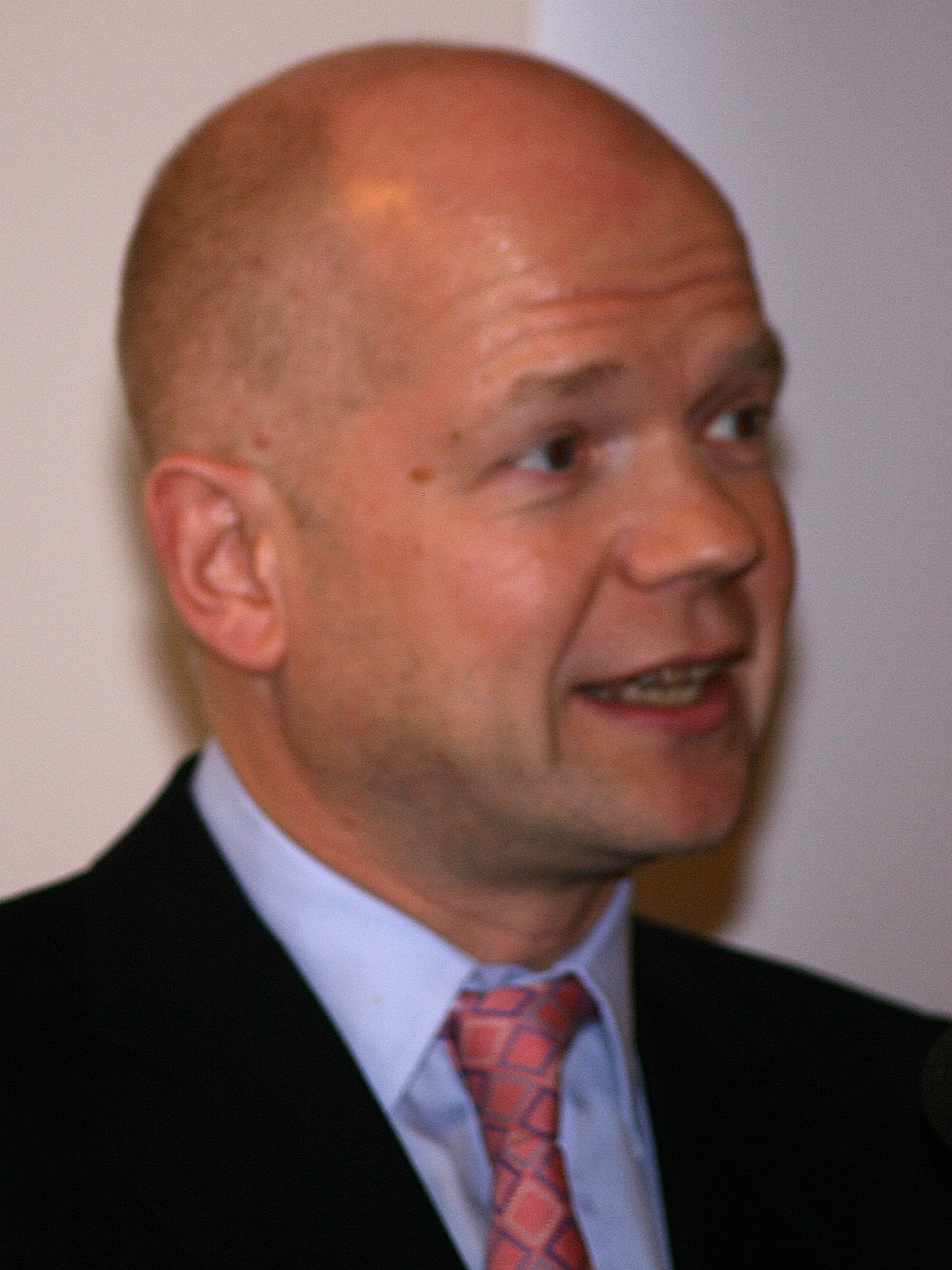
	First party	Second party
Leader	Tony Blair	Ieuan Wyn Jones
Party	Labour	Plaid Cymru
Leader since	21 July 1994	3 August 2000
Leader's seat	Sedgefield	Did not stand
Last election	34 seats, 54.7%	4 seats, 10.0%
Seats won	34	4
Seat change	Steady	Steady
Popular vote	666,956	195,893
Percentage	48.6%	14.3%
Swing	▼6.2 pp	▲4.3 pp
	Third party	Fourth party
Leader	Charles Kennedy	William Hague
Party	Liberal Democrats	Conservative
Leader since	9 August 1999	19 June 1997
Leader's seat	Ross, Skye & Inverness West	Richmond (Yorks)
Last election	2 seats, 12.4%	0 seats, 19.6%
Seats won	2	0
Seat change	Steady	Steady
Popular vote	189,254	288,623
Percentage	13.8%	19.6%
Swing	▲1.5 pp	Steady

On Thursday 7 June 2001, the 2001 United Kingdom general election was held in Wales, to elect all 659 members of the House of Commons, with 40 constituencies being in Wales.

== Candidates ==
Below is a table summarising the candidates of the 2001 general election in Wales.

Affiliation	Candidates
Labour Party	40
Conservative and Unionist Party	40
Liberal Democrats	40
Plaid Cymru	40
UK Independence Party	25
Independent	9
Prolife Alliance	7
Green Party of England and Wales	6
Socialist Labour Party	6
Welsh Socialist Alliance	6
Communist Party of Britain	2
New Millennium Bean Party	1
British National Party	1
Direct Customer Service Party	1
Total	224

== Analysis ==
The overall result remained exactly the same as in the previous election in 1997, with only two changes - Labour gained Ynys Môn from Plaid Cymru and Plaid gained Carmarthen East and Dinefwr from Labour. The Conservatives, despite taking the second largest number of votes in Wales, once again won no seats; this was only the second election since 1918 to leave them with no representation in Wales.

A BBC report of the election in Wales stated that "Despite a night of high tension the political map in Wales virtually looks the same as before".

The only seats to change hands were Carmarthen East and Dinefwr which Adam Price of Plaid Cymru gained from Labour and Ynys Môn which Labour gained from Plaid Cymru. Plaid failed to gain Rhondda which Chris Bryant held for Labour with a majority of over 16,000, a result the BBC said meant that Bryant had "confounded his critics". Bryant, a former curate who had once been a member of the Conservatives had been criticised as being an odd fit and "too exotic" for traditional Labour supporters in the constituency which he was contesting for the first time. This had led Plaid Cymru to feel they had a chance of a victory, a feat they had surprisingly achieved in the equivalent constituency at the 1999 National Assembly for Wales election. Plaid's candidate Leanne Wood had publicly claimed she would win 53% of the vote. Plaid's performance by the percentage points (14.3 per cent) would be its best result up until 2024.

The Conservatives again failed to win any seat in Wales, with their best result being in Monmouth where they finished just 384 votes behind Labour. The Liberal Democrats failed to add to their two seats, with Jenny Willott reducing Labour's majority in Cardiff Central to just 659 votes.

== Results ==
Below is a table summarising the results of the 2001 general election in Wales.

Party	Seats					Aggregate votes		
Party	Total	Gains	Losses	Net	Of total (%)	Total	Of total (%)	Change (%)
Labour	34	1	1	Steady	85.0	666,956	48.6	▼6.2
Conservative	0	0	0	Steady	—	288,623	19.6	Steady
Plaid Cymru	4	1	1	Steady	10.0	195,893	14.3	▲4.3
Liberal Democrats	2	0	0	Steady	5.0	189,254	13.8	▲1.5
UKIP	0	0	0	Steady	—	12,552	0.9	▲0.9
Independent	0	0	0	Steady	—	7,154	0.5	▲0.4
Green	0	0	0	Steady	—	3,753	0.3	▲0.2
Socialist Labour	0	0	0	Steady	—	2,805	0.2	▼0.2
Socialist Alliance	0	New			—	2,258	0.2	New
ProLife Alliance	0	0	0	Steady	—	1,609	0.1	▲0.1
New Millennium Bean	0	New			—	727	0.1	New
Communist	0	0	0	Steady	—	384	0.0	Steady
BNP	0	Did not stand in 1997			—	278	0.0	—N/a
Direct Customer Service	0	New			—	78	0.0	New
Total	40			0	100.0	1,372,324	100.0	0.0
Registered voters, and turnout							61.6	▼11.9

Popular vote
Labour	48.6%
Conservative	19.6%
Plaid Cymru	14.3%
Liberal Democrats	13.8%
Other	3.8%

Parliament seats
Labour	85.0%
Plaid Cymru	10.0%
Liberal Democrats	5.0%

== See also ==
- 2001 United Kingdom general election in England
- 2001 United Kingdom general election in Scotland
- 2001 United Kingdom general election in Northern Ireland
- List of MPs for constituencies in Wales (2001–2005)
