= BBC v HarperCollins Publishers Ltd =

BBC v HarperCollins
- Court: High Court of Justice
- Decided: 4 October 2010
- Citations: [2010] EWHC 2424 (Ch), [2011] EMLR 6

Court membership
- Judge sitting: Morgan J

BBC v HarperCollins (2010) EWHC 2424 was a 2010 case in English law, in which the BBC applied for an injunction to prevent HarperCollins publishing a book by Ben Collins, which was to reveal his identity as the racing driver known as 'The Stig' on the BBC's Top Gear programme.

== Judgement ==
The BBC was not granted the injunction. HarperCollins thus released the book in September 2010.

Robin Shaw of Davenport Lyons acted for HarperCollins. On the conclusion of the case in September 2010, The Times named Shaw as Lawyer of the Week.

== See also ==
- BBC v Johns
- R (ProLife Alliance) v. BBC
