= R (ProLife Alliance) v BBC =

R (ProLife Alliance) v BBC was a House of Lords case on the extent to which matters of good taste and decency are sufficient to justify the censorship of a party political broadcast.

The ProLife Alliance had submitted a video that showed the results of an abortion. The video was held to violate statutory regulations requiring public broadcasts to be decent. After extensive legal proceedings, the Court of Appeal ruled in favour of the ProLife Alliance. However, the decision was overturned by the House of Lords.

== Background ==
The ProLife Alliance is an advocacy group, and until 2004 a political party, that campaigns for "absolute respect for innocent human life from fertilisation until natural death and therefore opposes abortion, euthanasia, destructive embryo research and human cloning." (Paragraph 2 of the Court of Appeal judgment)

In 1997, the ProLife Alliance had enough support to be granted a Public Election Broadcast (PEB), subject to rules set out by the BBC, Independent Television Commission (ITC) and the Electoral Commission. The ProLife Alliance submitted a video that was graphic in nature. The video, the HL said, showed "the products of a suction abortion: tiny limbs, bloodied and dismembered, a separated head, their human shape and form plainly recognisable. There are some pictures showing the results of the procedures undertaken to procure an abortion at later stages... They are, I think, certainly disturbing to any person of ordinary sensibilities."

The broadcasters declined to show the video, on the grounds that it could have been offensive or disturbing to a large number of viewers. The ProLife Alliance sought permission for judicial review of their decision, which was refused. "A further application to the Court of Appeal was also refused. The appellant applied to the European Court of Human Rights, alleging a violation of Article 10 of the European Convention on Human Rights ("ECHR"). The application was declared inadmissible without the United Kingdom government being called on to put in observations." (Para. 7)

=== Laws applied ===
The Broadcasting Act 1990 makes the following provisions:

6(1) The Commission [viz. the ITC, established by BA 1990 s.1] shall do all that they can to secure that every licensed service complies with the following requirements, namely—

(a) that nothing is included in its programmes which offends against good taste or decency or is likely to encourage or incite to crime or to lead to disorder or to be offensive to public feeling;
(b) that any news given (in whatever form) in its programmes is presented with due accuracy and impartiality;
(c) that due impartiality is preserved on the part of the person providing the service as respects matters of political or industrial controversy or relating to current public policy; ...

(1) Subject to subsection (2), any regional Channel 3 licence or licence to provide Channel 4 or 5 shall include—

(a) conditions requiring the licence holder to include party political broadcasts in the licensed service; and
(b) conditions requiring the licence holder to observe such rules with respect to party political broadcasts as the Commission may determine.

[...]

(3) Without prejudice to the generality of paragraph (b) of subsection (1) but subject to section 37 of the Political Parties, Elections and Referendums Act 2000 (prohibition of broadcasts by unregistered parties) the Commission may determine for the purposes of that subsection—

(a) the political parties on whose behalf party political broadcasts may be made; and
(b) in relation to any political party on whose behalf such broadcasts may be made, the length and frequency of such broadcasts.

The following provisions of the Broadcasting Act 1996 are also important:

109(1) It shall be the duty of the BSC to monitor programmes to which section 108 applies with a view to enabling the BSC to make reports on the portrayal of violence and sexual conduct in, and the standards of taste and decency attained by, such programmes generally.

[...]

110(1) Subject to the provisions of this Part, it shall be the duty of the BSC to consider and adjudicate on complaints which are made to them in accordance with sections 111 and 114 and relate—

(a) to unjust or unfair treatment in programmes to which section 107 applies, or
(b) to unwarranted infringement of privacy in, or in connection with the obtaining of material included in, such programmes.

110(2) Subject to those provisions, it shall also be the duty of the BSC to consider, and make findings on, complaints which are made to them in accordance with sections 113 and 114 and relate—

[...]
(b) to alleged failures on the part of such programmes to attain standards of taste and decency.

== Court of Appeal ==
The Court of Appeal ruled in favour of the ProLife Alliance by stating that the BBC had acted unfairly in denying them one election broadcast in Wales.

== House of Lords ==
The House of Lords overruled the Court of Appeal decision.

== See also ==
- BBC v Harper Collins
- BBC v Johns
