= 2001 United Kingdom general election in Northern Ireland =

- 7 June 2001

All 18 Northern Irish seats to the House of Commons
- Turnout: 68.0% (▲0.9 pp)
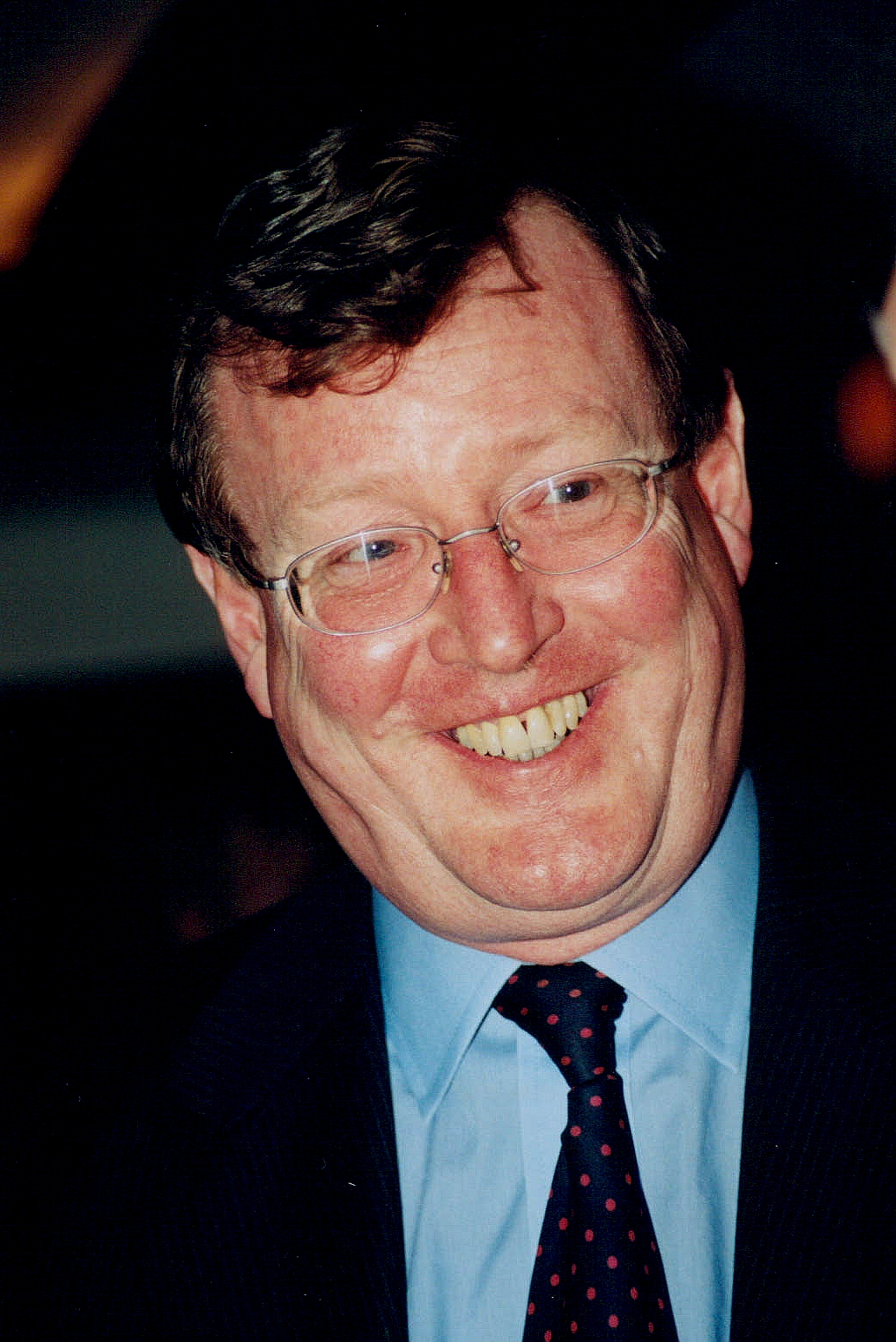

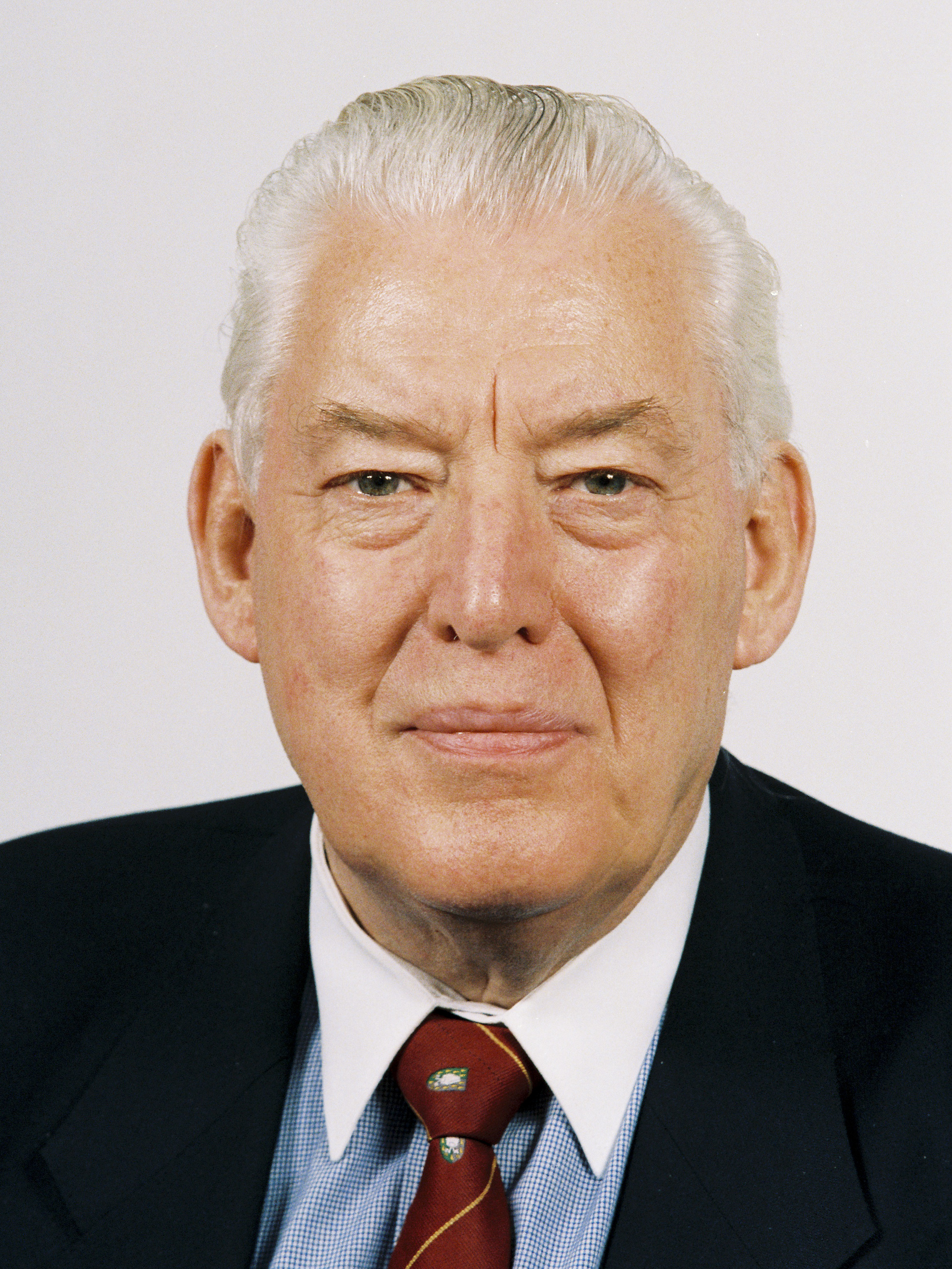

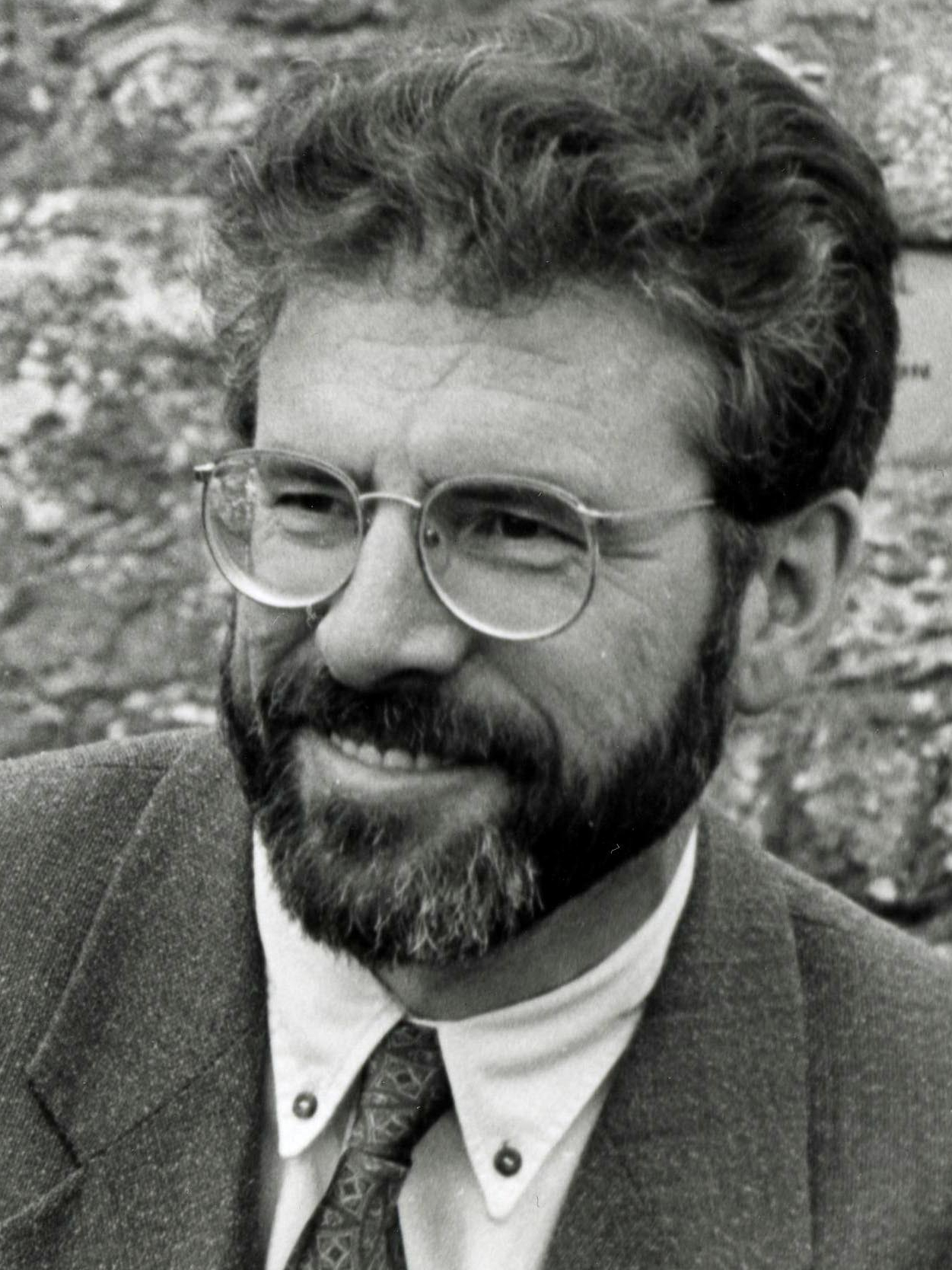

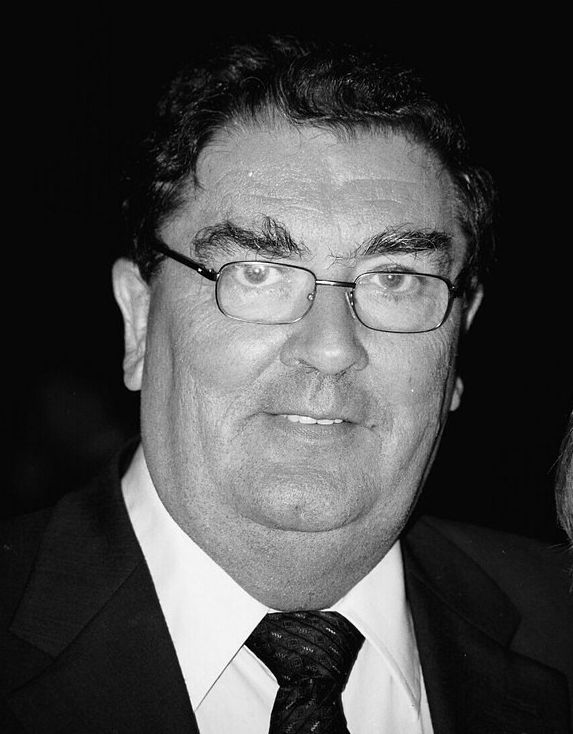
	First party	Second party	Third party
Leader	David Trimble	Ian Paisley	Gerry Adams
Party	UUP	DUP	Sinn Féin
Leader since	28 August 1995	30 September 1971	13 November 1983
Leader's seat	Upper Bann	North Antrim	Belfast West
Last election	10 seats, 32.7%	2 seats, 13.6%	2 seats, 16.1%
Seats won	6	5	4
Seat change	▼4	▲3	▲2
Popular vote	216,839	181,999	175,933
Percentage	26.8%	22.5%	21.7%
Swing	▼5.9 pp	▲8.9 pp	▲5.6 pp
	Fourth party	Fifth party
		UKUP
Leader	John Hume	Robert McCartney
Party	SDLP	UK Unionist
Leader since	1979	1995
Leader's seat	Foyle	North Down
Last election	3 seats, 24.1%	1 seat, 1.6%
Seats won	3	0
Seat change	Steady	▼1
Popular vote	169,865	13,509
Percentage	21.0%	1.7%
Swing	▼3.1 pp	▲0.1 pp
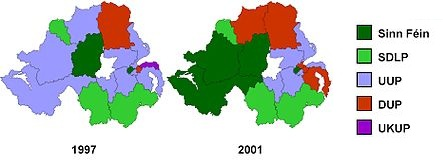
- Colours on map indicate winning party for each constituency

On 7 June 2001, the 2001 United Kingdom general election was held in Northern Ireland, to elect all 659 members of the House of Commons, including the 18 Northern Ireland seats. 1,191,009 people were eligible to vote, up 13,040 from the 1997 general election. 68.63% of eligible voters turned out (when including spoiled and excluded ballots), up 1.2 percentage points from the last general election.

The election resulted in a reduction in the share of vote and the number of seats won by the Ulster Unionist Party, though the UUP did remain the largest political party in Northern Ireland, and even managed to regain the seats of South Antrim after it was lost in a by-election in 2000 to the Democratic Unionist Party and North Down from the UK Unionist Party. The Social Democratic and Labour Party also suffered from a reduction in their share of the vote – ending in fourth place from second place at the last general election – though the SDLP did not lose any seats. Both the DUP and Sinn Féin increased their share of the vote as well as their number of seats.

== Candidates ==
Below is a table summarising the candidates of the 2001 general election in Northern Ireland.

Affiliation	Candidates
Sinn Féin	18
Social Democratic and Labour Party	18
Ulster Unionist Party	17
Democratic Unionist Party	14
Alliance Party of Northern Ireland	10
Workers' Party	6
Rainbow Dream Ticket	4
Independent	3
Northern Ireland Conservatives	3
Progressive Unionist Party	2
Northern Ireland Unionist Party	2
UK Unionist Party	1 (Note: Candidate Robert McCartney stood in North Down.)
Northern Ireland Women's Coalition	1
Ulster Third Way	1
Total	100

== Results ==
Below is a table summarising the results of the UK general election in Northern Ireland.

Party	Seats					Aggregate votes		
Party	Total	Gains	Losses	Net	Of all (%)	Total	Of all (%)	Change (%)
UUP	6	1	5	▼4	33.3	216,839	26.8	▼5.9
DUP	5	3	0	▲3	27.8	181,999	22.5	▲8.9
Sinn Féin	4	2	0	▲2	22.2	175,933	21.7	▲5.6
SDLP	3	0	0	Steady	16.7	169,865	21.0	▼3.1
Alliance	0	0	0	Steady	—	28,999	3.6	▼4.4
UK Unionist	0	0	1	▼1	—	13,509	1.7	▲0.1
Independent	0	0	0	Steady	—	8,379	1.0	▲0.8
PUP	0	0	0	Steady	—	4,781	0.6	▼0.8
NI Women's Coalition	0	0	0	Steady	—	2,968	0.4	Steady
NI Conservatives	0	0	0	Steady	—	2,422	0.3	▼0.9
Workers' Party	0	0	0	Steady	—	2,352	0.3	Steady
NI Unionist	0	New			—	1,794	0.2	New
Rainbow Dream Ticket	0	New			—	418	0.1	New
Third Way	0	New			—	116	0.0	New
Blank and invalid votes						7,038	—	—
Total	18			0	100.0	810,374 (Note: All valid votes excluding spoiled votes.)	100.0	0.0
Registered voters, and turnout						1,191,009	68.0	▲0.9

Popular vote
UUP	26.8%
DUP	22.5%
Sinn Féin	21.7%
SDLP	21.0%
APNI	3.6%
UKUP	1.7%
Independent	1.0%
PUP	0.6%
Women's Coalition	0.4%
NI Conservative	0.3%
Other	0.6%

Parliamentary seats
UUP	33.3%
DUP	27.8%
Sinn Féin	22.2%
SDLP	16.7%

== See also ==
- 2001 United Kingdom general election in England
- 2001 United Kingdom general election in Scotland
- 2001 United Kingdom general election in Wales
