= ProLife Alliance election results =

UK political party

ProLife Alliance was formed in the UK in October 1996, originally as a political party. It put up 56 candidates at the 1997 general election and also contested the 2001 general election and 2004 European elections.

== Election results ==
=== House of Commons ===
House of Commons of the United Kingdom
Election year	# of total votes	% of overall vote	# of seats won	Rank
1997	19,332▲	0.1%▲	0	18
2001	9,453 ▼	0.0% ▼	0	20

== 1997 general election ==
Constituency	Candidate	Votes	%
Altrincham & Sale West	Jonathan Stephens	313	0.6
Barking	Damien Mearns	159	0.5
Beaconsfield	Gillian Duval	286	0.6
Billericay	John Buchanan	570	1.0
Birmingham, Selly Oak	Greg Gardner	417	0.8
Bracknell	Dominica Roberts	276	0.5
Brent, E	Andrew Shanks	218	0.6
Caerphilly	Catherine Williams	270	0.6
Cambridge	Anna Johnstone	191	0.4
Cheltenham	Anne Harriss	245	0.5
Chipping Barnet	Brian Scallan	243	0.5
Copeland	Gerard Hanratty	389	0.9
Coventry, NW	Paul Mills	359	0.7
Cumbernauld & Kilsyth	Jan Kara	609	1.7
Dagenham	Kathleen Goble	152	0.4
Derby, N	Jane Waters	195	0.4
Don Valley	Claire Johnson	330	0.8
Doncaster, Central	Jonathan Redden	694	1.6
Ealing, Acton and Shepherd's Bush	Paul Danon	265	0.6
Ealing, Southall	Kinga Klepacka	473	0.9
East Kilbride	John Deighan	1170	2.4
Eastwood	Manar Tayan	393	0.8
Epsom & Ewell	Katherine Weeks	466	0.9
Glasgow, Anniesland	Akhtar Majid	374	1.1
Glasgow, Cathcart	Zofia Indyk	687	2.0
Glasgow, Maryhill	Jahangir Hanif	344	1.2
Glasgow, Pollok	Monica Gott	380	1.2
Grantham & Stamford	Rosa Clark	314	0.6
Hamilton, S	Colin Gunn	684	2.1
Hertford & Stortford	Michael Franey	259	0.5
Holborn & St Pancras	Bruno Quintavalle	114	0.3
Hornchurch	Joseph Sowerby	189	0.4
Kingston upon Hull East	Margaret Nolan	190	0.5
Leeds, NW	Robert Toone	251	0.5
Leyton & Wanstead	Sean Duffy	488	1.2
Liverpool, Riverside	Heather Neilson	277	0.7
Liverpool, Walton	Veronica Mearns	246	0.6
Liverpool, Wavertree	Rachel Kingsley	346	0.8
Manchester, Withington	Simon Caldwell	614	1.4
Morley & Rothwell	Pat Sammon	148	0.3
Orpington	Nicholas Wilton	191	0.3
Oxford, E	William Harper-Jones	318	0.7
Oxford, W & Abingdon	Linda Hodge	238	0.4
Paisley, N	Robert Graham	531	1.6
Peterborough	Stephen Goldspink	275	0.6
Rotherham	Andrew Neal	364	1.0
Sheffield, Central	Maureen Aitken	280	0.8
Solihull	Jim Caffery	623	1.0
Southampton, Itchen	Ferdi McDermott	99	0.2
Stevenage	David Bundy	196	0.4
Stratford-on-Avon	Sarah Miller	284	0.5
Surrey, SW	Josephine Quintavalle	258	0.5
Tottenham	Eleanor Tay	210	0.6
Welwyn Hatfield	Helen Harold	267	0.5
Wimbledon	Sophie Davies	346	0.7
Wirral, S	Jane Nielsen	264	0.6

== 2001 general election ==
Constituency	Candidate	Votes	%
Birmingham Ladywood	James Caffery	392	1.2
Bracknell	Dominica Roberts	324	0.7
Brent, E	Sarah Macken	392	1.4
Bridgend	Sara Jeremy	223	0.6
Brighton Kemptown	Elaine Cooke	147	0.4
Burton	John D.W. Roberts	288	0.6
Cambridge	Clare Underwood	232	0.5
Cambridgeshire, NE	Tony Hoey	238	0.5
Cambridgeshire, S	Beata Klepacka	176	0.4
Cardiff, C	Madeleine Jeremy	217	0.6
Cardiff, S & Penarth	Anne Savoury	367	1.0
Cheltenham	Anthony Gates	272	0.7
Chesham & Amersham	Gillian Duval	453	1.0
Ealing, Acton & Shepherd's Bush	Rebecca Ng	225	0.6
Enfield, N	Michael Akerman	241	0.6
Hampstead & Highgate	Mary Teale	92	0.3
Harrogate & Knaresborough	John Cornforth	272	0.6
Hertfordshire, SW	Julia Goffin	306	0.6
Kensington & Chelsea	Josephine Quintavalle	179	0.6
Manchester, C	Terrenia Brosnan	216	0.8
Merthyr Tydfil & Rhymney	Anthony Lewis	174	0.5
Midlothian	Terence Holden	177	0.6
Mole Valley	William Newton	475	1.0
Montgomeryshire	Ruth Davies	210	0.7
Neath	Gerry Brienza	202	0.6
Northampton, S	Clare Johnson	196	0.4
Oxford, E	Linda Hodge	254	0.6
Paisley, N	Robert Graham	263	1.0
Paisley, S	Patricia Graham	346	1.1
Pontypridd	Joseph Biddulph	216	0.6
Putney	Yvonne Windsor	185	0.5
Scarborough & Whitby	Theresa Murray	260	0.5
Solihull	Mary Pyne	374	0.8
Stevenage	Sarah Bell	173	0.4
Walthamstow	Barbara Duffy	289	0.8
Welwyn Hatfield	Fiona Pinto	230	0.5

== UK Parliament by-elections ==
=== 1997-2001 Parliament ===
By-election	Candidates	Votes	%
1997 Paisley South	John Deighan	578	2.5
1999 Hamilton South	Monica Burns	257	1.3

== Scottish Parliament elections ==
=== 1999 Scottish Parliament election ===
Source: BBC News

Regional list	Candidates	Votes	%
Central Scotland	John Deighan, Colin Barrett, Daniel Harty, Angela Deighan, Lucille McQuade, Andrew O'Neil, Katrina Main, Maria Creechan, JJ Creechan	2,567	0.8
Glasgow	Doreen McLellan, Zofia Indyk, Magnus MacFarlane-Barrow, David Harty, Monica Gott, Paul Tortolano, Michele Darmoul	2,357	0.9
Lothians	Terence Holden, Helen Holden	898	0.3
Mid Scotland and Fife	Henry Creechan, Nickie Willis, Astrid Willis, Anthony Tortolano, Jim Fullerton, David Tortolano, Cecilia Tortolano	735	0.2
West of Scotland	Robert Graham, Anne Kane, John Kerr, John Holsgrove, Patricia Graham, William Jones, Michael Deighan, Bernadette Creechan	3,227	1.0

== National Assembly for Wales elections ==
=== 2003 National Assembly for Wales election ===
Source: BBC News

==== Constituency ====
Constituency	Candidate	Votes	%
Cardiff Central	Madeleine Jeremy	239	1.2

==== Regional ====
Regional list	Candidates	Votes	%
Mid and West Wales	Sara Jeremy, Ruth Davies, Dominica Roberts, Thomas Roberts	383	0.2
North Wales	Anthony Jeremy, Elizabeth Lewis, Julia Millington, John Langley	310	0.2
South Wales Central	Anne Savoury, Madeleine Jeremy, Josephine Quintavalle, Anna Wilkins	573	0.3
South Wales East	Joseph Biddulph, Norman Plaisted, Fiona Pinto, Thomas Flynn	562	0.3
South Wales West	Gerardo Brienza, Sean Haran, Gillian Duval, Karolina Stolarska	355	0.3

== European Parliament elections ==
=== 2004 European Parliament election ===
20,393 votes total

Constituency	Candidates	Votes	%
East of England	Sarah Bell, Thomas Hoey, Beata Klepacka, John Matthews, Michael McBrien, Gregory Tagney, Clare Underwood	3,730	0.3
North West England	Fiona Pinto, Julia Millington, Kathleen Delarmi, Rosanne Allen, Fiona Daly	10,084	0.5
South East England	Dominica Roberts, Gillian Duval, Josephine Quintavalle, Penelope Orford, Mark Carroll, Rebecca Ng, John Dixon, Francis O'Brien, Yvonne Windsor, Carl St John	6,579	0.5
