= BBC v Johns =

- Court: Court of Appeal of England and Wales
- Full case name: The British Broadcasting Corporation v F.D. Johns (HM Inspector of Taxes)
- Decided: March 5, 1964
- Citations: BBC v Johns [1964] EWCA Civ 2, [1964] 1 All ER 923, 41 TC 471 (5 March 1964), Court of Appeal (England and Wales)

Court membership
- Judges sitting: Willmer LJ, Danckwerts LJ, Diplock LJ

Case opinions
- Government can not automatically create new prerogative powers, and that the BBC does not enjoy Crown immunity from taxation
- Decision by: Willmer LJ
- Concurrence: Danckwerts LJ
- Concur/dissent: Diplock LJ

BBC v Johns [1965] Ch 32 is a case in UK administrative law.

== Facts ==
The BBC argued that it was exempt from income tax, claiming to be a monopoly established by royal prerogative.

== Judgment ==
The court disagreed, ruling that is not possible to create new prerogative powers, and tax exemptions could only be granted by legislation.

The case is famous for the dictum of Lord Justice Diplock who states that it is "350 years and a civil war too late for the Queen’s courts to broaden the royal prerogative".

== See also ==
- R v Secretary of State for the Home Department, ex parte Northumbria Police Authority
- BBC v Harper Collins
- R (ProLife Alliance) v. BBC
