= ProLife Alliance =

Political party in the UK

ProLife Alliance (PLA) or simply ProLife, was an anti-abortion, single-issue political party that was active in the United Kingdom from 1996 to 2004. Since that time it has continued as an advocacy group. It is opposed to any form of euthanasia and opposes human cloning, abortion and experiments on human embryos. It supports guaranteed maternity and paternity leave. Its leader was Dominica Roberts.

The Pro-Life Alliance was founded by two anti-abortion activists, Josephine Quintavalle and her son Bruno Quintavalle. They contested the 1997 general election, bringing about litigation against the BBC over the latter's refusal to screen the PLA's party political broadcast. The party contested 56 of the 659 constituencies and attracted a total of 19,332 votes. It gained over 1% of the vote in only five constituencies in England and Wales, although did slightly better in Scotland, where it averaged 1.5% of the vote and secured over 2% in three seats. Its vote share declined further in the 1999 Scottish Parliamentary elections, 2001 general election, and 2004 European Parliament election. It disbanded in 2004.

== History ==
The Pro-Life Alliance was established as a political party in October 1996 by Josephine Quintavalle and her son Bruno Quintavalle. Its membership consisted a high percentage of Roman Catholics.

It contested 56 seats in the 1997 general election. In total, it attracted 19,332 votes, averaging of 345 votes per constituency. In England and Wales, the PLA gained over 1% of the vote in only five constituencies: Billericay, Leyton and Wanstead, Solihull, Manchester Withington, and Doncaster Central. In Scotland, it contested nine seats, all of them in the Greater Glasgow area. There, it averaged 1.5% of the vote and gained over 2% in three seats. That it did better in this part of Scotland rather than in England or Wales might reflect the greater proportion of Roman Catholics living in the Greater Glasgow area.

The refusal of the BBC to show its television party political broadcast led to litigation (R (ProLife Alliance) v BBC), in which it was ultimately unsuccessful.

The PLA contested the 1999 Scottish Parliamentary elections—the very first since the re-establishment of the Scottish Parliament—but its vote was less than that of the 1997 general election. This was despite the fact that the Scottish Parliament election utilised a form of proportional representation which benefited minor parties, a contrast to the general election's use of first-past-the-post voting. The sociologist Steve Bruce suggested that the decline in the Scottish vote may have been because voters were "too excited" by the restoration of their parliament after 292 years to "be interested in apparently fringe issues" such as abortion.

The PLA fielded 37 candidates at the 2001 general election. Its vote was lower than in 1997; it averaged 255 votes per seat, and 30 of its candidates polled less than 1%. 26 of its candidates came last in their respective constituencies.

In entering the 2004 European Parliament election, it had difficulty attracting candidates willing to stand, the result of which was that seven of the 22 standing for election in England contested more than one electoral region. The ProLife Alliance gained 20,393 votes in the 2004 European Parliament election, equating to 0.1% of votes cast. A few months later, in December 2004, the PLA disbanded as a political party and did not contest any seats in the 2005 general election. Much of the party's support subsequently went to a minor Christian democratic party, the Christian Peoples Alliance (CPA), with many of the CPA's electoral candidates having been former PLA candidates.

In 2003, the Department of Health significantly reduced the statistical information it provided about abortions for suspected foetal abnormalities. The ProLife Alliance challenged this under the Freedom of Information Act, and this challenge was supported by the Information Commissioner. An appeal by the Department of Health to the Information Tribunal failed. The Tribunal rejected the Department's view that personal information would be unreasonably endangered, and commented on the Department's duty to ensure compliance with the Abortion Act and its failure to scrutinise reporting forms "either clinically or substantively". The Department first planned to appeal to the High Court, but subsequently conceded and made the requested information available in July 2011.

The sociologist Steve Bruce was of the view that the Pro-Life Alliance's inability to achieve political success reflected the "relative unpopularity of abortion as an election issue" in the United Kingdom. In his view, its "failure" at the ballot box demonstrated "a failure to win the argument", with the majority of the British population believing that abortion should remain legal. A 2005 poll found that over 70% of Britons believed that abortion should be always or mostly legal while less than a quarter thought that it should be always or mostly illegal.

== Election results ==
=== House of Commons ===
House of Commons of the United Kingdom
Election year	# of total votes	% of overall vote	# of seats contested	# of seats won	Rank
1997	19,332	0.1%	56	0	19
2001	9,453 ▼	0.0% ▼	37 ▼	0	22

== See also ==
- ProLife Alliance election results
- R (ProLife Alliance) v BBC
