= Teignbridge District Council elections =

Local government elections in Devon, England

Teignbridge District Council in Devon, England is elected every four years. Since the last boundary changes in 2019, 47 councillors have been elected from 24 wards.

== Election results ==
Composition of the council
Year	Conservative	Liberal Democrats (Note: Includes totals for the predecessors of the Liberal Democrats, the Liberal Party and SDP (both of which participated in the Alliance).)	Labour	Independents & Others	Council control after election
Local government reorganisation; council established (57 seats)
1973	0	1	7	49	Independent
1976	8	3	1	45	Independent
New ward boundaries (58 seats)
1979	22	4	1	31	Independent
1983	22	5	3	28	No overall control
1987	27	4	2	25	No overall control
1991	19	11	4	24	No overall control
1995	5	25	7	21	No overall control
1999	19	16	2	21	No overall control
New ward boundaries (46 seats)
2003	14	16	0	16	No overall control
2007	19	21	0	6	No overall control
2011	26	13	0	7	Conservative
2015	29	11	0	6	Conservative
New ward boundaries (47 seats)
2019	12	26	0	9	Liberal Democrats
2023	9	26	0	12 (Note: 9 South Devon Alliance, 3 Independent)	Liberal Democrats

== Results maps ==
2003 results map

2007 results map

2011 results map

2015 results map

2019 results map

2023 results map

== By-election results ==
=== 1995–1999 ===
Bovey By-Election 4 July 1996
Party	Candidate	Votes	%	±%
Conservative		504	34.1	
Liberal Democrats		482	32.6	
Labour		282	19.1	
Independent		210	14.2	
Majority		22	1.5	
Turnout		1,478	30.0	
Conservative hold		Swing		

Whitestones By-Election 4 July 1996
Party	Candidate	Votes	%	±%
Independent		665	91.5	
Labour		62	8.5	
Majority		603	83.0	
Turnout		727	42.9	
Independent hold		Swing		

Chudleigh By-Election 14 November 1996
Party	Candidate	Votes	%	±%
Independent		480	54.5	
Liberal Democrats		230	26.1	
Labour		171	19.4	
Majority		250	29.4	
Turnout		881		
Independent gain from Labour		Swing		

Milber By-Election 14 November 1996
Party	Candidate	Votes	%	±%
Conservative		338	44.4	
Liberal Democrats		219	28.7	
Labour		205	26.9	
Majority		199	15.7	
Turnout		762		
Conservative gain from Liberal Democrats		Swing		

College By-Election 20 March 1997
Party	Candidate	Votes	%	±%
Liberal Democrats		391	44.0	
Conservative		269	30.3	
Independent		229	25.8	
Majority		122	13.7	
Turnout		889	22.0	
Liberal Democrats gain from Independent		Swing		

Dawlish SW By-Election 21 May 1998
Party	Candidate	Votes	%	±%
Conservative		584	55.6	+12.8
Liberal Democrats		262	24.9	−32.4
Labour		205	19.5	+19.5
Majority		322	30.7	
Turnout		1,051	32.0	
Conservative gain from Liberal Democrats		Swing		

=== 1999–2003 ===
College By-Election 27 April 2000
Party	Candidate	Votes	%	±%
Liberal Democrats		447	52.5	+27.8
Conservative		315	37.0	+14.7
Labour		89	10.5	−5.6
Majority		132	15.5	
Turnout		851	22.0	
Liberal Democrats hold		Swing		

Powderham By-Election 27 April 2000
Party	Candidate	Votes	%	±%
Liberal Democrats		759	52.6	
Conservative		550	38.1	
Labour		134	9.3	
Majority		209	14.5	
Turnout		1,443	28.4	
Liberal Democrats gain from Labour		Swing		

College By-Election 16 November 2000
Party	Candidate	Votes	%	±%
Conservative		332	40.7	+18.7
Liberal Democrats		294	36.1	+11.4
Labour		189	23.2	+7.1
Majority		38	4.6	
Turnout		815	20.7	
Conservative gain from Independent		Swing		

=== 2007–2011 ===
Kenn Valley By-Election 27 November 2008
Party	Candidate	Votes	%	±%
Conservative	Kevin Lake	924	45.2	
Liberal Democrats	Susan Berman	832	40.8	
Independent	Derek Madge	160	7.8	
Independent	Dudley Swain	128	6.3	
Majority		92	4.4	
Turnout		2,044	42.1	
Conservative gain from Liberal Democrats		Swing		

Ipplepen By-Election 23 September 2010
Party	Candidate	Votes	%	±%
Liberal Democrats	Alistair Dewhirst	756	62.3	+34.5
Conservative	Phil Coombes	458	37.7	−34.5
Majority		298	24.5	
Turnout		1,214		
Liberal Democrats gain from Conservative		Swing		

=== 2011–2015 ===
Bovey By-Election 24 October 2013
Party	Candidate	Votes	%	±%
Conservative	Avril Kerswell	933	50.3	+10.9
Liberal Democrats	Charlie West	472	25.5	−1.0
UKIP	Bruce Meechan	253	13.6	+6.6
Labour	Lisa Robillard Webb	196	10.6	+2.9
Majority		461	24.9	
Turnout		1,854		
Conservative hold		Swing		

=== 2015–2019 ===
Teignmouth Central by-election 22 September 2016
Party	Candidate	Votes	%	±%
Liberal Democrats	Alison Eden	491	51.1	+28.3
Conservative	Nick Maylem	286	29.8	−12.6
UKIP	Steven Harvey	111	11.6	N/A
Labour	Malcolm Tipper	72	7.5	−8.7
Majority		205	21.3	
Turnout		969	25.08	
Liberal Democrats gain from Conservative		Swing		

The by-election was triggered by the death of Conservative Party Councillor Geoff Bladen

Bovey by-election 15 December 2016
Party	Candidate	Votes	%	±%
Liberal Democrats	Sally Morgan	838	43.9	+20.3
Conservative	Taff Evans	631	33.1	−4.2
Independent	Eoghan Kelly	169	8.9	−1.5
Labour	Christopher Robillard	103	5.4	−7.4
UKIP	Anne Bracher	98	5.1	N/A
Independent	Charlie West	68	3.6	N/A
Majority		207	10.8	
Turnout		1,911	29.30	
Liberal Democrats gain from Conservative		Swing		

The by-election was triggered by the death of Conservative Party Councillor Anna Klinkenberg

Chudleigh by-election 15 December 2016
Party	Candidate	Votes	%	±%
Liberal Democrats	Richard Keeling	680	51.5	+38.8
Conservative	Chris Webb	470	35.6	+2.8
UKIP	Steven Harvey	89	6.7	N/A
Labour	Janette Parker	81	6.1	−8.8
Majority		210	15.9	
Turnout		1,324	26.49%	
Liberal Democrats gain from Conservative		Swing		

The by-election was triggered by the death of Conservative Party Councillor Patricia Johnson-King

Bushell by-election 4 May 2017
Party	Candidate	Votes	%	±%
Liberal Democrats	Robert Hayes	751	48.9	+5.2
Conservative	Liz Roberts	627	40.8	+5.8
UKIP	Steven Harvey	158	10.3	+10.3
Majority		124	8.1	
Turnout		1,536		
Liberal Democrats gain from Conservative		Swing		

The by-election was triggered by the resignation of Conservative Party Councillor Judy Grainger

Kingsteignton East by-election 4 May 2017
Party	Candidate	Votes	%	±%
Conservative	Ron Peart	778	52.4	+19.3
Liberal Democrats	Sue Rollason	437	29.4	+14.2
Independent	Tony Dempster	270	18.2	−1.6
Majority		341	23.0	
Turnout		1,485		
Conservative hold		Swing		

The by-election was triggered by the resignation of Conservative Party Councillor Mike Walters Tony Dempster ran as a UKIP candidate in 2015.

Chudleigh by-election 15 February 2018
Party	Candidate	Votes	%	±%
Liberal Democrats	Lorraine Evans	575	41.0	+28.2
Conservative	Pam Elliott	564	40.3	+7.5
Labour	Janette Parker	262	18.7	+3.7
Majority		11	0.8	
Turnout		1,401		
Liberal Democrats gain from Conservative		Swing		

The by-election was triggered by the disqualification of Conservative Party Councillor Doug Laing, due to a prison sentence longer than 3 months

Dawlish Central and North East by-election 15 February 2018
Party	Candidate	Votes	%	±%
Liberal Democrats	Martin Wrigley	1,287	70.6	+47.5
Conservative	Angela Fenne	535	29.4	−0.7
Majority		752	41.3	
Turnout		1,822		
Liberal Democrats gain from Conservative		Swing		

The by-election was triggered by the resignation of Conservative Party Councillor Graham Price

=== 2023–2027 ===
Ashburton and Buckfastleigh by-election 2 May 2024
Party	Candidate	Votes	%	±%
Liberal Democrats	Jack Major	715	30.6	
Alliance	Sue Clarke	523	22.4	
Conservative	Richard Edlmann	325	13.9	
Labour	Lisa Robillard Webb	303	13.0	
Green	Pauline Wynter	295	12.6	
Independent	Michael Hext	136	5.8	
Heritage	Madeleine Hunt	36	1.5	
Majority		192	8.2	
Turnout		2,333		
Liberal Democrats hold		Swing		

Teignmouth West by-election 1 May 2025
Party	Candidate	Votes	%	±%
Reform	Steve Horner	400	35.2	
Liberal Democrats	Penny Lloyd	372	32.7	
Conservative	Joe Dagger	142	12.5	
Green	Ollie Hind	128	11.3	
Labour	Colin Baigent	80	7.0	
Heritage	Madeleine Hunt	14	1.2	
Majority		28	2.5	
Turnout		1,142	29.3	
Reform gain from Liberal Democrats				

Kenn Valley by-election 9 October 2025
Party	Candidate	Votes	%	±%
Liberal Democrats	Kevin Smith	1,116	50.4	
Reform	Terry Tume	512	23.1	
Conservative	Lucille Baker	212	9.6	
Independent	Kevin Lake	181	8.2	
Green	Scott Williams	122	5.5	
Labour	Niall Duffy	59	2.7	
Independent	Dudley Swain	12	0.5	
Majority		604	27.3	
Turnout		2,214		
Liberal Democrats gain from Conservative				

Kevin Lake was the incumbent councillor, having been disqualified for non-attendance.

Dawlish South West by-election 25 June 2026
Party	Candidate	Votes	%	±%
Liberal Democrats	Pat Hackett	692	45.3	
Reform	Sue Whiteing	451	29.5	
Green	Scott Williams	230	15.1	
Conservative	Joe Dagger	154	10.1	
Majority		241	15.8	
Turnout		1,527		
Liberal Democrats hold				
