= 2011 Teignbridge District Council election =

Local election in Devon, UK

Results of the 2011 Teignbridge District Council election

Elections to Teignbridge District Council were held on 5 May 2011, alongside other local elections across the United Kingdom. All 46 seats on the council were up for election. Following the election the Conservative Party gained the council from no overall control.

== Results summary ==
2011 Teignbridge District Council election
Party	Seats	Change
Conservative Party	26	▲8
Liberal Democrats	13	▼7
Others	7	▼1

== See also ==
- Teignbridge District Council elections
