= 2019 Teignbridge District Council election =

English local election

- 2 May 2019

Party	Liberal Democrats	Conservative	Independent
Popular vote	31,993	23,346	10,679
Percentage	40.5%	29.6%	13.5%
- Results map by ward
Council control before election
No overall control
Council control after the election
Liberal Democrats

The 2019 Teignbridge District Council election took place on 2 May 2019 to elect members of Teignbridge District Council in England. At the election, the Liberal Democrats won control of the council.

== Summary ==
=== Election result ===
2019 Teignbridge District Council election
Party	Candidates	Seats	Gains	Losses	Net gain/loss	Seats %	Votes %	Votes	+/−
Liberal Democrats	44	26	N/A	N/A	▲15	55.3	40.5	31,993	+11.5
Conservative	46	12	N/A	N/A	▼19	25.5	29.6	23,346	–8.2
Independent	22	9	N/A	N/A	▲4	19.1	13.5	10,679	–1.9
Labour	29	0	N/A	N/A	Steady	0.0	10.0	7,898	+5.3
UKIP	10	0	N/A	N/A	Steady	0.0	3.3	2,586	–0.2
Green	6	0	N/A	N/A	Steady	0.0	2.9	2,311	–6.3

== Ward results ==
Incumbents are denoted by an asterisk (*).

=== Ambrook ===
Ambrook
Party	Candidate	Votes	%	±%
Independent	Richard Andrew Daws	990	47.1	
Independent	Mary Elizabeth Colclough*	848	40.3	
Liberal Democrats	Margaret Irene Crompton	638	30.3	
Liberal Democrats	Tessa Carol Amies	564	26.8	
Conservative	Dennis Esmond Smith*	394	18.7	
Conservative	Richard Michael Butterworth	335	15.9	
Majority		210	10.0	
Turnout		2,121	45.62	
Independent win (new seat)				
Independent win (new seat)				

=== Ashburton & Buckfastleigh ===
Ashburton & Buckfastleigh
Party	Candidate	Votes	%	±%
Liberal Democrats	Frederick John Nutley*	1,420	46.4	
Liberal Democrats	Huw William Cox	996	32.5	
Conservative	Sarah Parker-Khan	984	32.2	
Liberal Democrats	Jack Anthony Major	960	31.4	
Labour	Andrew Timothy Stokes	795	26.0	
Conservative	Charles Ernest Dennis*	656	21.4	
Conservative	Shane Nigel Fleming	563	18.4	
Labour	Anne Mary Goulborn	530	17.3	
Independent	Philip Christopher Vogel	497	16.2	
Labour	Patrick John Howard	407	13.3	
Independent	Sylvia Lilian Phillips	351	11.5	
Independent	Zoé Lynn Ellis	177	5.8	
Independent	James Russell Birch Dennis	132	4.3	
Majority		24	0.8	
Turnout		3,080	44.43	
Liberal Democrats win (new seat)				
Liberal Democrats win (new seat)				
Conservative win (new seat)				

=== Bishopsteignton ===
Bishopsteignton
Party	Candidate	Votes	%	±%
Liberal Democrats	Andrew Kier MacGregor	405	45.6	
Conservative	Nicholas Timothy Golder*	376	42.3	
UKIP	Llewellyn Williams	107	12.0	
Majority		29	3.3	
Turnout		901	40.55	
Liberal Democrats win (new seat)				

=== Bovey ===
Bovey
Party	Candidate	Votes	%	±%
Liberal Democrats	Sally Angela Morgan	1,083	40.8	
Conservative	Avril Joan Kerswell*	1,070	40.3	
Conservative	George John Gribble*	1,033	38.9	
Independent	Eoghan Eamon Kelly	1,018	38.4	
Conservative	Martyn John Evans	981	37.0	
Labour	Lisa Collette Robillard Webb	641	24.2	
Labour	Susan Mary Honnor	476	17.9	
Labour	Ian Hugh Wellens	404	15.2	
Majority		15	0.5	
Turnout		2,682	42.63	
Liberal Democrats win (new seat)				
Conservative win (new seat)				
Conservative win (new seat)				

=== Bradley ===
Bradley
Party	Candidate	Votes	%	±%
Independent	Michael John Hocking*	590	37.0	
Conservative	Philip Andrew Bullivant*	574	36.0	
Liberal Democrats	Richard David Jenks	567	35.6	
Liberal Democrats	Brian Christopher Hayes	533	33.4	
Conservative	Elizabeth Gorman Roberts	376	23.6	
Labour	Jamie David Cook	145	9.1	
Labour	Mark Alastair Langabeer	117	7.3	
Majority		7	0.4	
Turnout		1,610	30.93	
Independent win (new seat)				
Conservative win (new seat)				

=== Buckland & Milber ===
Buckland & Milber
Party	Candidate	Votes	%	±%
Liberal Democrats	Gordon Nicholas Hook*	1,519	64.0	
Liberal Democrats	Colin Neil Parker*	1,162	49.0	
Liberal Democrats	Christopher Richard Jenks	1,023	43.1	
UKIP	Steven James Harvey	416	17.5	
Conservative	Christopher Julian Coyle-Moore	362	15.3	
UKIP	Stephen Jamie Witts	353	14.9	
Conservative	Paul Reginald Furneaux Winsor*	346	14.6	
Labour	Jane Haden	284	12.0	
Conservative	Jonathan James Hodgson	250	10.5	
Labour	James William Osben	230	9.7	
Independent	Eloise Rokirilov	202	8.5	
Labour	Rheanne Marie Osben	196	8.3	
Majority		607	25.6	
Turnout		2,397	36.83	
Liberal Democrats win (new seat)				
Liberal Democrats win (new seat)				
Liberal Democrats win (new seat)				

=== Bushell ===
Bushell
Party	Candidate	Votes	%	±%
Liberal Democrats	Jacqueline Ann Hook*	639	44.8	
Liberal Democrats	Robert Henry Hayes*	444	31.1	
Independent	Paul Kirk Field	409	28.7	
Independent	Julie Ann Jones	319	22.4	
Labour	Ryan William Hall	245	17.2	
Conservative	Anthony Reginald Ballinger	219	15.4	
Conservative	Simon Michael Walker	183	12.8	
Labour	Pauline Angela Wynter	178	12.5	
Majority		35	2.4	
Turnout		1,452	32.09	
Liberal Democrats win (new seat)				
Liberal Democrats win (new seat)				

=== Chudleigh ===
Chudleigh
Party	Candidate	Votes	%	±%
Liberal Democrats	Richard Michael Keeling*	918	46.6	
Liberal Democrats	Lorraine Margaret Evans*	698	35.4	
Conservative	Georgina Sherwood	658	33.4	
Green	Emily Joyce Simcock	442	22.4	
Conservative	Christopher James Yeo	422	21.4	
Labour	Janette Ann Parker	233	11.8	
Labour	Joseph James Blurton	208	10.6	
Majority		24	0.8	
Turnout		2,005	42.93	
Liberal Democrats win (new seat)				
Liberal Democrats win (new seat)				

=== College ===
College
Party	Candidate	Votes	%	±%
Independent	Janet Bradford	743	46.9	
Independent	Liam David Parker	596	37.6	
Liberal Democrats	Michael John Pilkington*	388	24.5	
Liberal Democrats	Michael Douglas Joyce	338	21.3	
Independent	David Howe	241	15.2	
Labour	Oliver Giddings	168	10.6	
Conservative	John Trevor Thomas Phillips	159	10.0	
Conservative	Nicholas Paul Yabsley	146	9.2	
Labour	Paul David Wynter	133	8.4	
UKIP	John Steven Gynn	102	6.4	
Majority		208	13.1	
Turnout		1,592	39.21	
Independent win (new seat)				
Independent win (new seat)				

=== Dawlish North East ===
Dawlish North East
Party	Candidate	Votes	%	±%
Liberal Democrats	John Martin Charles Wrigley*	1,406	59.8	
Liberal Democrats	Linda Petherick	1,173	49.9	
Liberal Democrats	Linda Jean Goodman-Bradbury	982	41.8	
Conservative	Lisa Eugene Mayne*	596	25.4	
Green	Christina Gabriel Humphries	529	22.5	
Conservative	Kevin Peter Parsons	485	20.6	
Conservative	Noel Nickless	445	18.9	
UKIP	Judith Ellen Wood	409	17.4	
Majority		386	16.4	
Turnout		2,374	35.27	
Liberal Democrats win (new seat)				
Liberal Democrats win (new seat)				
Liberal Democrats win (new seat)				

=== Dawlish South West ===
Dawlish South West
Party	Candidate	Votes	%	±%
Liberal Democrats	John Robert Petherick	722	41.3	
Liberal Democrats	Gary William Taylor	702	40.2	
Conservative	Rosalind Mary Prowse*	561	32.1	
Conservative	Humphrey Hawkey Clemens*	518	29.7	
Green	John Patrick Crawford Watson	405	23.2	
UKIP	Douglas Reay Waring Wood	277	15.9	
Majority		141	8.1	
Turnout		1,763	36.86	
Liberal Democrats win (new seat)				
Liberal Democrats win (new seat)				

=== Haytor ===
Haytor
Party	Candidate	Votes	%	±%
Independent	Adrian Patch	376	37.5	
Independent	Robert Howard Steemson	321	32.0	
Conservative	Jeremy Owen Christophers*	222	22.1	
Labour	Philip Cunningham	57	5.7	
Independent	Jessica Mai Hodge	27	2.7	
Majority		55	5.5	
Turnout		1,013	49.10	
Independent win (new seat)				

=== Ipplepen ===
Ipplepen
Party	Candidate	Votes	%	±%
Liberal Democrats	John Peter Alistair Dewhirst*	786	80.0	
Conservative	Lloyd Roland Fursdon	197	20.0	
Majority		589	60.0	
Turnout		998	48.45	
Liberal Democrats win (new seat)				

=== Kenn Valley ===
Kenn Valley
Party	Candidate	Votes	%	±%
Liberal Democrats	Charles John Sinclair Nuttall	1,258	49.1	
Liberal Democrats	Nicholas Andrew Swain	1,194	46.6	
Liberal Democrats	Alison Grace Foden	1,133	44.2	
Conservative	Kevin Andrew Lake*	1,058	41.3	
Conservative	John Robert Goodey*	1,006	39.3	
Conservative	Adrian Lewis Wood	890	34.7	
Labour	Sarah Elizabeth Krys	288	11.2	
Labour	Anthony Krys	232	9.1	
Majority		75	2.9	
Turnout		2,608	40.15	
Liberal Democrats win (new seat)				
Liberal Democrats win (new seat)				
Liberal Democrats win (new seat)				

=== Kenton & Starcross ===
Kenton & Starcross
Party	Candidate	Votes	%	±%
Liberal Democrats	Alan Michael Connett*	848	77.7	
Green	Megan Kathryn Debenham	149	13.7	
Conservative	Lucille Mary Michelle Baker	93	8.5	
Majority		699	64.0	
Turnout		1,094	46.65	
Liberal Democrats win (new seat)				

=== Kerswell-with-Combe ===
Kerswell-with-Combe
Party	Candidate	Votes	%	±%
Independent	Michael John Haines*	917	52.2	
Liberal Democrats	Sheila Mary Cook*	704	40.1	
Conservative	Andrew Martin Thirkell Hartley	570	32.5	
Liberal Democrats	Cameron Charles Whitford	533	30.4	
Conservative	Fiona Grace Muddeman	251	14.3	
Majority		134	7.6	
Turnout		1,765	36.98	
Independent win (new seat)				
Liberal Democrats win (new seat)				

=== Kingsteignton East ===
Kingsteignton East
Party	Candidate	Votes	%	±%
Independent	Beryl Austen*	663	46.7	
Conservative	Ronald Peart*	520	36.6	
Liberal Democrats	Marie Chadwick	491	34.6	
Green	Jennifer Mary Osborne	314	22.1	
Conservative	Robert James Perry	252	17.8	
Liberal Democrats	David John Corney-Walker	183	12.9	
Majority		29	2.0	
Turnout		1,427	28.67	
Independent win (new seat)				
Conservative win (new seat)				

=== Kingsteignton West ===
Kingsteignton West
Party	Candidate	Votes	%	±%
Conservative	William Herbert Percy Thorne*	445	36.4	
Liberal Democrats	David William Rollason*	443	36.3	
Independent	Antony Darryl David Dempster	422	34.6	
Liberal Democrats	Philip Chadwick	367	30.1	
UKIP	Jacqueline Mary Hooper	265	21.7	
Conservative	Sam Morfey	203	16.6	
Majority		21	1.7	
Turnout		1,223	27.50	
Conservative win (new seat)				
Liberal Democrats win (new seat)				

=== Moretonhampstead ===
Moretonhampstead
Party	Candidate	Votes	%	±%
Conservative	Michael Harrold Jeffery*	537	48.1	
Liberal Democrats	John Farrand-Rogers	422	37.8	
Labour	Brian McAuley	157	14.1	
Majority		115	10.3	
Turnout		1,145	47.12	
Conservative win (new seat)				

=== Shaldon & Stokeinteignhead ===
Shaldon & Stokeinteignhead
Party	Candidate	Votes	%	±%
Conservative	Christopher Stuart Clarance*	663	65.5	
Liberal Democrats	Julie Mary Gregory	284	28.1	
Labour	Colin John Baigent	65	6.4	
Majority		115	10.3	
Turnout		1,032	50.17	
Conservative win (new seat)				

=== Teign Valley ===
Teign Valley
Party	Candidate	Votes	%	±%
Conservative	Stephen John Kinross Purser	841	49.9	
Conservative	Terence Charles Mark Tume	667	39.6	
Liberal Democrats	Briony Falch	589	34.9	
Green	Mary Anne McFarlane	472	28.0	
Liberal Democrats	Karen Tracy Chaplin	361	21.4	
Labour	Michael Edwin Megee	249	14.8	
Majority		78	4.7	
Turnout		1,722	42.69	
Conservative win (new seat)				
Conservative win (new seat)				

=== Teignmouth Central ===
Teignmouth Central
Party	Candidate	Votes	%	±%
Independent	Jacqueline Orme*	634	39.1	
Liberal Democrats	Alison Margaret Eden*	589	36.3	
Liberal Democrats	Peter Malcolm Williams	552	34.1	
Conservative	Keith Ronald Underhill	422	26.0	
Labour	Lillian Georgina Jean Chasteau	278	17.1	
UKIP	David Anthony Gunn	237	14.6	
Labour	Noah Steven Nelson Chasteau	236	14.6	
Majority		37	2.2	
Turnout		1,639	37.88	
Independent win (new seat)				
Liberal Democrats win (new seat)				

=== Teignmouth East ===
Teignmouth East
Party	Candidate	Votes	%	±%
Conservative	Robert Julius Phipps	705	42.2	
Conservative	Ella Sylvia Russell*	625	37.4	
Liberal Democrats	Catriona Thomas	467	27.9	
Liberal Democrats	Brian Leslie Dennis Wright	466	27.9	
UKIP	Christopher Charles Whitlock	246	14.7	
Labour	Marilyn Anne Warrener	227	13.6	
Labour	Donald Bruce Mattock	211	12.6	
Majority		158	4.7	
Turnout		1,709	43.07	
Conservative win (new seat)				
Conservative win (new seat)				

=== Teignmouth West ===
Teignmouth West
Party	Candidate	Votes	%	±%
Liberal Democrats	David Nicholas Cox*	649	49.7	
Liberal Democrats	Nina Susan Jeffries	394	30.2	
Conservative	David Andrew Matthews*	291	22.3	
Labour	Jacqueline Mary Jackson	270	20.7	
Labour	Jeffrey Lee Pocock	238	18.2	
Independent	Colin Joseph Authers	206	15.8	
Conservative	June Green	198	15.2	
UKIP	Geraldine Williams	174	13.3	
Majority		35	2.4	
Turnout		1,314	33.63	
Liberal Democrats win (new seat)				
Liberal Democrats win (new seat)				

== Changes 2019–2023 ==
- In September 2020, John Petherick (Dawlish South West) and Linda Petherick (Dawlish North East), both elected as Liberal Democrats, left the party to sit as independent councillors.
- By December 2021, Alison Eden (Teignmouth Central) and Andrew MacGregor (Bishopsteignton), both elected as Liberal Democrats, had formed a separate "Liberal Democrat Independent" group.
- In May 2022, sitting independent councillors Richard Daws (Ambrook), Janet Bradford and Liam Mullone (College) and Adrian Patch (Haytor) — members of the "Newton Says No" campaign group — registered a new party, the South Devon Alliance, with Mullone as its leader.
- Chris Clarance, elected for the Conservatives in Shaldon & Stokeinteignhead, was still listed under the Conservative group as of May 2022. By January 2023, he had moved to the Independent Group.
- Sarah Parker-Khan, elected for the Conservatives in Ashburton & Buckfastleigh, and Jacqui Orme, elected as an independent in Teignmouth Central, both left the council around April 2023.
