= 2023 Teignbridge District Council election =

2023 UK local government election

- 4 May 2023

Party	Liberal Democrats	Alliance
Party	Conservative	Independent
- Results map by ward
Leader before election
Alan Connett
Liberal Democrat
No overall control
Leader after election
Martin Wrigley
Liberal Democrats

The 2023 Teignbridge District Council election took place on 4 May 2023 to elect members of Teignbridge District Council in Devon, England. This was on the same day as other local elections across England.

The Liberal Democrats won a majority on the council, which had been under no overall control prior to the election.

== Overview ==
The council was under no overall control prior to the election, being led by Alan Connett of the Liberal Democrats. He chose not to stand for re-election.

The Liberal Democrats won 26 of the 47 seats on the council, giving them a majority. The Liberal Democrats chose Martin Wrigley as their new leader, and he was formally appointed as the new leader of the council at the subsequent annual council meeting on 23 May 2023.

== Summary ==
=== Election result ===
2023 Teignbridge District Council election
Party	Candidates	Seats	Gains	Losses	Net gain/loss	Seats %	Votes %	Votes	+/−
Liberal Democrats	43	26	5	5	Steady	55.3	39.5	28,005	–1.0
Conservative	34	9	2	5	▼3	19.1	23.6	16,719	–6.0
Alliance	26	9	9	0	▲9	19.1	15.8	11,232	N/A
Independent	10	3	3	9	▼6	6.4	7.0	4,940	–6.5
Labour	16	0	0	0	Steady	0.0	6.6	4,658	–3.4
Green	13	0	0	0	Steady	0.0	6.2	4,416	+3.3
Heritage	7	0	0	0	Steady	0.0	0.9	626	N/A
TUSC	2	0	0	0	Steady	0.0	0.3	197	N/A
Reform	1	0	0	0	Steady	0.0	0.1	95	N/A

== Ward results ==
The Statement of Persons Nominated, which details the candidates standing in each ward, was released by Teignbridge District Council following the close of nominations.

=== Ambrook ===
Ambrook (2 seats)
Party	Candidate	Votes	%	±%
Alliance	Richard Daws*	1,145	64.4	+17.3
Alliance	Paul Parker	1,062	59.7	+19.4
Liberal Democrats	Margaret Crompton	638	35.9	+5.6
Liberal Democrats	Pete Goodman-Bradbury	467	26.3	−0.5
Majority				
Rejected ballots		14	0.8	
Turnout		1,792	38	
Registered electors		4,670		
Alliance gain from Independent		Swing		
Alliance gain from Independent		Swing		

=== Ashburton & Buckfastleigh ===
Ashburton & Buckfastleigh (3 seats)
Party	Candidate	Votes	%	±%
Liberal Democrats	John Nutley*	1,226	43.6	−2.8
Liberal Democrats	Huw Cox*	1,030	36.6	+4.1
Conservative	Stuart Rogers	834	29.6	−2.6
Liberal Democrats	Jack Major	808	28.7	−2.7
Alliance	Susan Clarke	793	28.2	N/A
Alliance	David Knopfler	769	27.3	N/A
Green	Roger Haworth	712	25.3	N/A
Conservative	Charlie Dennis	683	24.3	+2.9
Conservative	Mark Searight	599	21.3	+2.9
Labour	Janette Parker	341	12.1	−13.9
Majority				
Rejected ballots		8	0.3	
Turnout		2,821	40	
Registered electors		7,008		
Liberal Democrats hold		Swing		
Liberal Democrats hold		Swing		
Conservative hold		Swing		

=== Bishopsteignton ===
Bishopsteignton
Party	Candidate	Votes	%	±%
Independent	Andrew MacGregor*	565	66.0	+20.4
Conservative	Arthur Baverstock	291	34.0	−8.3
Majority		274	32.0	
Rejected ballots		8	0.9	
Turnout		864	40	
Registered electors		2,189		
Independent gain from Liberal Democrats		Swing		

=== Bovey ===
Bovey (3 seats)
Party	Candidate	Votes	%	±%
Liberal Democrats	Sally Morgan*	1,011	42.2	+1.4
Conservative	Martin Smith	786	32.8	−7.5
Conservative	Stuart Webster	763	31.8	−7.1
Conservative	Cathie Wreford-Holden	696	29.0	−8.0
Liberal Democrats	Steve Oldrieve	627	26.2	N/A
Labour	Lisa Robillard Webb	564	23.5	−0.7
Independent	Eoghan Kelly	519	21.7	−16.7
Green	Charlie West	478	19.9	N/A
Green	Imca Hensels	444	18.5	N/A
Green	Jack Pelling	411	17.2	N/A
Liberal Democrats	Robert Speht	397	16.6	N/A
Majority				
Rejected ballots		8	0.3	
Turnout		2,404	37	
Registered electors		6,521		
Liberal Democrats hold		Swing		
Conservative hold		Swing		
Conservative hold		Swing		

=== Bradley ===
Bradley (2 seats)
Party	Candidate	Votes	%	±%
Conservative	Philip Bullivant*	521	32.6	−3.4
Liberal Democrats	Richard Buscombe	445	27.8	−7.8
Alliance	Dawn Hall	428	26.8	N/A
Conservative	Richard Jenks	392	24.5	−11.1
Alliance	Lin Lambell	392	24.5	N/A
Liberal Democrats	Chris Jenks**	379	23.7	−9.7
Green	Pauline Wynter	257	16.1	N/A
Green	Paul Wynter	248	15.5	N/A
Majority				
Rejected ballots		3	0.2	
Turnout		1,602	27	
Registered electors		5,903		
Conservative hold		Swing		
Liberal Democrats gain from Independent		Swing		

Chris Jenks was a sitting councillor for Buckland & Milber ward

=== Buckland & Milber ===
Buckland & Milber (3 seats)
Party	Candidate	Votes	%	±%
Alliance	Mike Ryan	752	39.2	N/A
Liberal Democrats	Colin Parker*	735	38.3	−10.7
Alliance	Alex Hall	652	34.0	N/A
Liberal Democrats	David Corney-Walker	619	32.2	−31.8
Alliance	Belinda Brint	540	28.1	N/A
Liberal Democrats	Anthony James	466	24.3	−18.8
Conservative	Karen Crout	387	20.2	+4.9
Green	Susan Collman	241	12.6	N/A
Green	Stephen Pocock	197	10.3	N/A
TUSC	Jane Haden	116	6.0	−6.0
Heritage	Madeleine Hunt	90	4.7	N/A
Heritage	Mon Burns	86	4.5	N/A
TUSC	James Osben	81	4.2	−5.5
Heritage	Timothy Dobson	80	4.2	N/A
Majority				
Rejected ballots		20	1.0	
Turnout		1,940	30	
Registered electors		6,478		
Alliance gain from Liberal Democrats		Swing		
Liberal Democrats hold		Swing		
Alliance gain from Liberal Democrats		Swing		

=== Bushell ===
Bushell (2 seats)
Party	Candidate	Votes	%	±%
Liberal Democrats	Jackie Hook*	503	43.2	−1.6
Liberal Democrats	Rob Hayes*	412	35.4	+4.3
Alliance	Mike Joyce	342	29.4	+0.7
Alliance	Laurence Jones	304	26.1	+3.7
Conservative	Nicolas Yabsley	215	18.5	+3.1
Conservative	Simon Walker	185	15.9	+3.1
Green	Olly Giddings	158	13.6	N/A
Heritage	Richard Dobson	73	6.3	N/A
Majority				
Rejected ballots		9	0.8	
Turnout		1,173	26	
Registered electors		4,596		
Liberal Democrats hold		Swing		
Liberal Democrats hold		Swing		

=== Chudleigh ===
Chudleigh (2 seats)
Party	Candidate	Votes	%	±%
Liberal Democrats	Richard Keeling*	916	52.8	+6.2
Liberal Democrats	Suzanne Sanders	797	45.9	+10.5
Conservative	Ben Kirby	587	33.8	+0.4
Labour	Rick Webb	486	28.0	+16.2
Conservative	Chris Yeo	421	24.3	+2.9
Majority				
Rejected ballots		10	0.6	
Turnout		1,746	35	
Registered electors		4,941		
Liberal Democrats hold		Swing		
Liberal Democrats hold		Swing		

=== College ===
College (2 seats)
Party	Candidate	Votes	%	±%
Alliance	Janet Bradford*	897	64.7	+17.8
Alliance	Liam Mullone*	761	54.9	+17.3
Green	Doug Pratt	279	20.1	N/A
Labour	Don Frampton	277	20.0	+9.4
Conservative	Sarah Hearn	229	16.5	+7.3
Conservative	John Phillips	158	11.4	+1.4
Majority				
Rejected ballots		0	0.0	
Turnout		1,386	34	
Registered electors		4,116		
Alliance gain from Independent		Swing		
Alliance gain from Independent		Swing		

=== Dawlish North East ===
Dawlish North East (3 seats)
Party	Candidate	Votes	%	±%
Liberal Democrats	Martin Wrigley*	1,438	62.8	+3.0
Liberal Democrats	Rosie Dawson	1,182	51.7	+1.8
Liberal Democrats	Lin Goodman-Bradbury*	1,033	45.1	+3.3
Independent	Linda Petherick*	783	34.2	−15.7
Conservative	Lisa Mayne	693	30.3	+4.9
Independent	Wayne Munday	404	17.7	N/A
Heritage	Andrew Cruikshank	212	9.3	N/A
Majority				
Rejected ballots		19	0.8	
Turnout		2,307	32	
Registered electors		7,162		
Liberal Democrats hold		Swing		
Liberal Democrats hold		Swing		
Liberal Democrats hold		Swing		

=== Dawlish South West ===
Dawlish South West (2 seats)
Party	Candidate	Votes	%	±%
Liberal Democrats	Alison Foden**	767	46.0	+4.7
Liberal Democrats	Mike James	553	33.2	−7.0
Independent	Angie Weatherhead	537	32.2	N/A
Conservative	Rosalind Prowse	453	27.2	−4.9
Independent	John Petherick*	417	25.0	−16.3
Alliance	Pete Costello	223	13.4	N/A
Majority				
Rejected ballots		3	0.2	
Turnout		1,671	34	
Registered electors		4,890		
Liberal Democrats hold		Swing		
Liberal Democrats hold		Swing		

Alison Foden was a sitting councillor for Kenn Valley ward

=== Haytor ===
Haytor
Party	Candidate	Votes	%	±%
Independent	Robert Steemson	483	61.1	+29.1
Conservative	Martyn Evans	153	19.3	−2.8
Alliance	Ty Lynne	124	15.7	N/A
Heritage	André Sabine	31	3.9	N/A
Majority		330	41.7	
Rejected ballots		6	0.8	
Turnout		797	40	
Registered electors		2,003		
Independent gain from Independent		Swing		

=== Ipplepen ===
Ipplepen
Party	Candidate	Votes	%	±%
Liberal Democrats	David Palethorpe	367	39.4	−40.6
Conservative	Dennis Smith	323	34.7	+14.7
Alliance	Nicky Rayner	241	25.9	N/A
Majority		44	4.7	
Rejected ballots		2	0.2	
Turnout		933	45	
Registered electors		2,055		
Liberal Democrats hold		Swing		

=== Kenn Valley ===
Kenn Valley (3 seats)
Party	Candidate	Votes	%	±%
Liberal Democrats	Charles Nuttall*	1,270	52.4	+3.3
Liberal Democrats	John Parrott	1,076	44.4	−2.2
Conservative	Kevin Lake	919	37.9	−3.4
Liberal Democrats	Donna Braund	912	37.6	−6.6
Conservative	Caroline May	699	28.8	−10.5
Conservative	Lucille Baker	633	26.1	−8.6
Green	Lucy Rockliffe	624	25.7	N/A
Labour	Jacob Cousens	406	16.7	+7.5
Majority				
Rejected ballots		11	0.5	
Turnout		2,436	36	
Registered electors		6,716		
Liberal Democrats hold		Swing		
Liberal Democrats hold		Swing		
Conservative gain from Liberal Democrats		Swing		

=== Kenton & Starcross ===
Kenton & Starcross
Party	Candidate	Votes	%	±%
Liberal Democrats	Gary Taylor*	642	70.4	−7.3
Green	Pete Wilby	175	19.2	+5.5
Reform	Chris Hilditch	95	10.4	N/A
Majority		467	51.2	
Rejected ballots		6	0.7	
Turnout		918	39	
Registered electors		2,368		
Liberal Democrats hold		Swing		

=== Kerswell-with-Combe ===
Kerswell-with-Combe (2 seats)
Party	Candidate	Votes	%	±%
Alliance	Jane Taylor	923	57.7	N/A
Alliance	John Radford	837	52.3	N/A
Liberal Democrats	Cameron Whitford	439	27.4	−2.9
Conservative	James Leader	340	21.3	−11.2
Liberal Democrats	Richard Raybould	334	20.9	−18.2
Majority				
Rejected ballots		4	0.2	
Turnout		1,604	34	
Registered electors		4,745		
Alliance gain from Independent		Swing		
Alliance gain from Liberal Democrats		Swing		

=== Kingsteignton East ===
Kingsteignton East (2 seats)
Party	Candidate	Votes	%	±%
Conservative	Ron Peart*	650	47.3	+10.7
Alliance	Keeley Gearon	310	22.6	N/A
Alliance	Samantha Bickham	299	21.8	N/A
Liberal Democrats	Rachel Edmonds	299	21.8	−12.8
Liberal Democrats	Rebecca Jones	292	21.3	+8.4
Labour	Sarah Cochrane	234	17.0	N/A
No Description	Antony Dempster	196	14.3	N/A
Majority				
Rejected ballots		1	0.1	
Turnout		1,375	27	
Registered electors		5,163		
Conservative hold		Swing		
Alliance gain from Independent		Swing		

=== Kingsteignton West ===
Kingsteignton West (2 seats)
Party	Candidate	Votes	%	±%
Liberal Democrats	Dave Rollason*	514	44.7	+8.4
Conservative	Bill Thorne*	468	40.7	+4.3
Liberal Democrats	Denise Nation	456	39.7	+9.6
Conservative	Sue Danks	395	34.3	+17.7
Labour	Duncan Moss	232	20.2	N/A
Majority				
Rejected ballots		2	0.2	
Turnout		1,152	24	
Registered electors		4,769		
Liberal Democrats hold		Swing		
Conservative hold		Swing		

=== Moretonhampstead ===
Moretonhampstead
Party	Candidate	Votes	%	±%
Liberal Democrats	John Farrand-Rogers	558	48.2	+10.4
Conservative	Richard Eldmann	414	35.8	−12.3
Labour	Christopher Robillard	185	16.0	+1.9
Majority		144	12.4	
Rejected ballots		9	0.8	
Turnout		1,166	48	
Registered electors		2,428		
Liberal Democrats gain from Conservative		Swing		

=== Shaldon & Stokeinteignhead ===
Shaldon & Stokeinteignhead
Party	Candidate	Votes	%	±%
Independent	Chris Clarance*	698	70.4	+4.9
Liberal Democrats	Kathryn Cox	165	16.6	−11.5
Alliance	Manuela Murray	79	8.0	N/A
Labour	Marilyn Warrener	50	5.0	−1.4
Majority		533	53.7	
Rejected ballots		5	0.5	
Turnout		997	49	
Registered electors		2,039		
Independent gain from Conservative		Swing		

=== Teign Valley ===
Teign Valley (2 seats)
Party	Candidate	Votes	%	±%
Conservative	Stephen Purser*	764	46.7	−3.2
Liberal Democrats	Andy Swain	627	38.3	+3.4
Conservative	Terry Tume*	626	38.3	−1.3
Liberal Democrats	Chris Webb	608	37.2	+15.8
Labour	Niall Duffy	363	22.2	+7.4
Majority				
Rejected ballots		13	0.8	
Turnout		1,648	41	
Registered electors		4,024		
Conservative hold		Swing		
Liberal Democrats gain from Conservative		Swing		

=== Teignmouth Central ===
Teignmouth Central (2 seats)
Party	Candidate	Votes	%	±%
Liberal Democrats	David Cox	663	44.1	+7.8
Conservative	Joan Atkins	430	28.6	+2.6
Liberal Democrats	Sonja Miller	398	26.5	−7.6
Independent	Alison Eden*	338	22.5	−13.8
Alliance	Jimmy Robinson	291	19.3	N/A
Labour	Tom Colclough	246	16.4	−0.7
Labour	Hedley Baldwin	241	16.0	+1.4
Heritage	Colin Bovingdon	54	3.6	N/A
Majority				
Rejected ballots		12	0.8	
Turnout		1,516	35	
Registered electors		4,297		
Liberal Democrats hold		Swing		
Conservative gain from Independent		Swing		

=== Teignmouth East ===
Teignmouth East (2 seats)
Party	Candidate	Votes	%	±%
Liberal Democrats	Michael Jackman	582	34.2	+6.3
Liberal Democrats	Peter Williams	578	34.0	+6.1
Conservative	Rob Phipps*	468	27.5	−14.7
Conservative	Sylvia Russell*	433	25.4	−12.0
Alliance	Jude Chilvers	294	17.3	N/A
Labour	Lillian Chasteau	284	16.7	+3.1
Alliance	Alasdair MacGregor	223	13.1	N/A
Labour	Malcolm Tipper	215	12.6	±0.0
Green	Frances Hamilton	192	11.3	N/A
Majority				
Rejected ballots		23	1.3	
Turnout		1,725	44	
Registered electors		3,956		
Liberal Democrats gain from Conservative		Swing		
Liberal Democrats gain from Conservative		Swing		

=== Teignmouth West ===
Teignmouth West (2 seats)
Party	Candidate	Votes	%	±%
Liberal Democrats	Nina Jeffries*	402	36.8	+6.6
Liberal Democrats	Andy Henderson	374	34.2	−15.5
Labour	Jackie Jackson	270	24.7	+4.0
Alliance	Ollie Hind	267	24.5	N/A
Labour	Rachel Aylward	264	24.2	+6.0
Alliance	Ricky Marino	228	20.9	N/A
Conservative	Christopher Sidwell	211	19.3	−3.0
Majority				
Rejected ballots		4	0.4	
Turnout		1,096	28	
Registered electors		3,908		
Liberal Democrats hold		Swing		
Liberal Democrats hold		Swing		

== Changes 2023–2027 ==
- Nina Jeffries, elected as a Liberal Democrat, left the party in August 2024 to sit as an independent.
- In August 2024, John Radford left the South Devon Alliance to sit as an independent, leaving the party tied with the Conservatives as the council's second-largest group and without enough members to hold the official opposition role alone.
- The South Devon Alliance disbanded in November 2024 with its members becoming independents.
- Alex Hall, one of the former South Devon Alliance councillors, subsequently joined the Conservatives later in November 2024.

=== By-elections ===
==== Ashburton & Buckfastleigh ====
By-election triggered by death of Liberal Democrat councillor Huw Cox.

Ashburton & Buckfastleigh by-election, 2 May 2024
Party	Candidate	Votes	%	±%
Liberal Democrats	Jack Major	715	30.6	−5.6
Alliance	Susan Clarke	523	22.4	−5.3
Conservative	Richard Edlmann	325	13.9	−11.1
Labour	Lisa Robillard Webb	303	13.0	+0.9
Green	Pauline Wynter	295	12.6	−12.7
Independent	Michael Hext	136	5.8	N/A
Heritage	Madeleine Hunt	36	1.5	N/A
Majority		192	8.2	N/A
Turnout		2,333	33.5	−6.5
Registered electors		7,010		
Liberal Democrats hold				

==== Teignmouth West ====
The by-election was triggered by the resignation of Nina Jeffries, who had been elected as a Liberal Democrat but was sitting as an independent councillor at the time she stood down.

Teignmouth West by-election, 1 May 2025
Party	Candidate	Votes	%	±%
Reform	Steve Horner	400	35.2	N/A
Liberal Democrats	Penny Lloyd	372	32.7	−2.7
Conservative	Joe Dagger	142	12.5	−6.8
Green	Ollie Hind	128	11.3	N/A
Labour	Colin Baigent	80	7.0	−17.4
Heritage	Madeleine Hunt	14	1.2	N/A
Majority		28	2.5	N/A
Turnout		1,142	29.3	+1.3
Reform gain from Liberal Democrats				

==== Kenn Valley ====
The by-election was triggered by the disqualification of Conservative councillor Kevin Lake for vacation of office after not attending a council meeting for six months, under section 85 of the Local Government Act 1972; Lake stood in the resulting by-election as an independent.

Kenn Valley by-election, 9 October 2025
Party	Candidate	Votes	%	±%
Liberal Democrats	Kevin Smith	1,116	50.4	+11.0
Reform	Terry Tume	512	23.1	N/A
Conservative	Lucille Baker	212	9.6	–19.0
Independent	Kevin Lake	181	8.2	N/A
Green	Scott Williams	122	5.5	–13.9
Labour	Niall Duffy	59	2.7	–9.9
Independent	Dudley Swain	12	0.5	N/A
Majority		604	27.3	N/A
Turnout		2,219	31.0	–5.0
Liberal Democrats gain from Conservative				

==== Dawlish South West ====
The by-election was triggered by the death of Liberal Democrat councillor Mike James, a former Mayor of Torbay, who died after suffering a fall while going to help another person who had collapsed in the street.

Dawlish South West by-election, 25 June 2026
Party	Candidate	Votes	%	±%
Liberal Democrats	Pat Hackett	692	45.3	+5.7
Reform	Sue Whiteing	451	29.5	N/A
Green	Scott Williams	230	15.1	N/A
Conservative	Joe Dagger	154	10.1	−17.1
Majority		241	15.8	+14.8
Turnout		1,527	31.6	−2.4
Liberal Democrats hold		Swing	N/A	
