= South Devon Alliance =

- Abbreviation: SDA
- Leader: Richard Daws
- Founded: 23 March 2021; 4 years ago
- Dissolved: November 2024
- Headquarters: Newton Abbot, Devon
- Colours: Green

Website
- southdevonalliance.org

The South Devon Alliance (SDA) was a short-lived minor political party in Teignbridge District, Devon, England.

== History ==
The South Devon Alliance was founded on 23 March 2021. It had emerged out of the "Newton Says No" group, who campaigned to stop housing development within the area. In February 2023, two members of Newton Abbot Town Council joined the party.

In the 2023 Teignbridge District Council election, the SDA won 9 seats. One candidate was David Knopfler from Dire Straits who contested Ashburton and Buckfastleigh ward. In a 2024 by-election in the same ward the SDA came in second place. The South Devon Alliance formed the largest opposition grouping on the council. The party supported the Queen Street Traders and Residents group in opposing a pedestrianisation scheme in Newton Abbot. Liam Mullone was the South Devon Alliance candidate in Newton Abbot constituency in the 2024 United Kingdom general election. He came in 6th place with 4% of the vote. In August 2024, councillor John Radford left the party to sit as an independent.

In November 2024 the party announced it was dissolving as they felt a political party was no longer the best way to represent their interests on Teignbridge District Council.

== Election results ==
Election	Seats
2023 Teignbridge District Council election	9 / 47

== See also ==
- East Devon Alliance
