= Results of the 1997 United Kingdom general election by constituency =

- 1 May 1997
- Colours on map indicate the party allegiance of each constituency's MP.

This is the breakdown of the results of the 1997 United Kingdom general election by constituency. The results are listed by nation, region and/or county.

- **Bold** indicates the candidate that was elected MP
- † represents that the incumbent did not run again.
- § represents that the incumbent was defeated for nomination.
- ₰ represents that the incumbent was disqualified from their nomination contest.
- ‡ represents that the incumbent contested a different constituency.

== Breakdown by regions ==
Nation	Region	County/Sub-region	Total MPs	Labour		Conservative		Liberal Democrat		Others	
England (529)	East Midlands (44)	Derbyshire	10	9	▲5	1	▼5	0	Steady	0	Steady
England (529)	East Midlands (44)	Leicestershire and Rutland	10	5	▲2	5	▼2	0	Steady	0	Steady
England (529)	East Midlands (44)	Lincolnshire	7	1	▲1	6	▼1	0	Steady	0	Steady
England (529)	East Midlands (44)	Northamptonshire	6	5	▲5	1	▼5	0	Steady	0	Steady
England (529)	East Midlands (44)	Nottinghamshire	11	10	▲3	1	▼3	0	Steady	0	Steady
England (529)	East of England (56)	Bedfordshire	6	3	▲3	3	▼2	0	Steady	0	Steady
England (529)	East of England (56)	Cambridgeshire	7	2	▲1	5	▼1	0	Steady	0	Steady
England (529)	East of England (56)	Essex	17	6	▲5	10	▼5	1	▲1	0	Steady
England (529)	East of England (56)	Hertfordshire	11	5	▲5	6	▼5	0	Steady	0	Steady
England (529)	East of England (56)	Norfolk	8	4	▲3	4	▼3	0	Steady	0	Steady
England (529)	East of England (56)	Suffolk	7	2	▲1	5	▼1	0	Steady	0	Steady
England (529)	Greater London (74)	North East London	23	22	▲7	1	▼7	0	Steady	0	Steady
England (529)	Greater London (74)	North West London	20	15	▲10	5	▼10	0	Steady	0	Steady
England (529)	Greater London (74)	South East London	16	11	▲2	4	▼2	1	Steady	0	Steady
England (529)	Greater London (74)	South West London	15	9	▲7	1	▼12	5	▲5	0	Steady
England (529)	North East England (30)	Cleveland	6	6	▲2	0	▼2	0	Steady	0	Steady
England (529)	North East England (30)	County Durham	7	7	Steady	0	Steady	0	Steady	0	Steady
England (529)	North East England (30)	Northumberland	4	2	Steady	1	Steady	1	Steady	0	Steady
England (529)	North East England (30)	Tyne and Wear	13	13	▲1	0	▼1	0	Steady	0	Steady
England (529)	North West England (76)	Cheshire	11	7	▲1	3	▼1	0	Steady	1	▲1
England (529)	North West England (76)	Cumbria	6	4	Steady	2	Steady	0	Steady	0	Steady
England (529)	North West England (76)	Greater Manchester	28	25	▲6	2	▼5	1	▼1	0	Steady
England (529)	North West England (76)	Lancashire	15	13	▲5	2	▼5	0	Steady	0	Steady
England (529)	North West England (76)	Merseyside	16	15	▲2	0	▼3	1	▲1	0	Steady
England (529)	South East England (83)	Berkshire	8	3	▲3	4	▼3	1	Steady	0	Steady
England (529)	South East England (83)	Buckinghamshire	7	2	▲2	5	▼2	0	Steady	0	Steady
England (529)	South East England (83)	East Sussex	8	4	▲4	3	▼5	1	▲1	0	Steady
England (529)	South East England (83)	Hampshire	17	3	▲2	11	▼3	3	▲2	0	Steady
England (529)	South East England (83)	Isle of Wight	1	0	Steady	0	▼1	1	▲1	0	Steady
England (529)	South East England (83)	Kent	17	8	▲8	9	▼7	0	Steady	0	Steady
England (529)	South East England (83)	Oxfordshire	6	1	Steady	4	▼1	1	▲1	0	Steady
England (529)	South East England (83)	Surrey	11	0	Steady	11	Steady	0	Steady	0	Steady
England (529)	South East England (83)	West Sussex	8	1	▲1	7	▼1	0	Steady	0	Steady
England (529)	South West England (51)	Bristol	4	4	▲2	0	▼2	0	Steady	0	Steady
England (529)	South West England (51)	Cornwall	5	1	▲1	0	▼3	4	▲2	0	Steady
England (529)	South West England (51)	Devon	11	3	▲2	5	▼4	3	▲2	0	Steady
England (529)	South West England (51)	Dorset	8	0	Steady	8	▲1	0	▼1	0	Steady
England (529)	South West England (51)	Gloucestershire	8	4	▲3	2	▼4	2	▲1	0	Steady
England (529)	South West England (51)	Somerset	9	1	▲1	2	▼4	5	▲3	0	Steady
England (529)	South West England (51)	Wiltshire	6	2	▲2	4	▼2	0	Steady	0	Steady
England (529)	West Midlands (59)	Herefordshire	2	0	Steady	1	▼1	1	▲1	0	Steady
England (529)	West Midlands (59)	Shropshire	5	3	▲2	2	▼1	0	Steady	0	Steady
England (529)	West Midlands (59)	Staffordshire	12	8	▲3	4	▼3	0	Steady	0	Steady
England (529)	West Midlands (59)	Warwickshire	5	4	▲2	1	▼2	0	Steady	0	Steady
England (529)	West Midlands (59)	West Midlands county	29	24	▲4	4	▼4	0	Steady	1	Steady
England (529)	West Midlands (59)	Worcestershire	6	3	▲3	3	▼3	0	Steady	1	Steady
England (529)	Yorkshire and the Humber (56)	Humberside	10	7	▲2	3	▼2	0	Steady	0	Steady
England (529)	Yorkshire and the Humber (56)	North Yorkshire	8	3	▲2	4	▼3	1	▲1	0	Steady
England (529)	Yorkshire and the Humber (56)	South Yorkshire	15	14	Steady	0	▼1	1	▲1	0	Steady
England (529)	Yorkshire and the Humber (56)	West Yorkshire	23	22	▲9	0	▼10	1	▲1	0	Steady
Northern Ireland (18)										18	
Scotland (72)		Central Scotland	10	10	Steady	0	Steady	0	Steady	0	Steady
Scotland (72)		Glasgow	10	10	Steady	0	Steady	0	Steady	0	Steady
Scotland (72)		Highlands and Islands	7	2	▲1	0	Steady	4	▼1	1	Steady
Scotland (72)		Lothians	9	8	▲1	0	▼2	1	▲1	0	Steady
Scotland (72)		Mid Scotland and Fife	9	6	▲1	0	▼2	1	Steady	2	▲1
Scotland (72)		North East Scotland	9	5	▲2	0	▼2	2	▲1	2	Steady
Scotland (72)		South Scotland	9	6	▲2	0	▼3	2	Steady	1	▲1
Scotland (72)		West Scotland	9	9	▲1	0	▼1	0	Steady	0	Steady
Wales (40)		Mid and West Wales	8	4	Steady	0	▼1	2	▲1	2	Steady
Wales (40)		North Wales	9	7	▲2	0	▼2	0	Steady	2	Steady
Wales (40)		South Central Wales	8	8	▲2	0	▼2	0	Steady	0	Steady
Wales (40)		South East Wales	8	8	▲1	0	▼1	0	Steady	0	Steady
Wales (40)		South West Wales	7	7	Steady	0	Steady	0	Steady	0	Steady

== England ==
England elected 529 out of the 659 Members of Parliament across the 9 regions of England.

=== East Midlands ===
The East Midlands elected 44 Members of Parliament across 6 counties; Derbyshire, Leicestershire, Lincolnshire, Northamptonshire, Nottinghamshire and Rutland.

==== Derbyshire ====
Derbyshire elected 10 Members of Parliament in 10 seats – 2 borough and 8 county constituencies.

Constituency	Candidates					Incumbent
Constituency	Labour	Conservative	Liberal Democrat	Referendum	Other	Incumbent
Amber Valley	**Judy Mallaber** **29,943 (54.7%)**	Phillip Oppenheim 18,330 (33.4%)	Roger Shelley 4,219 (7.7%)	Irene McGibbon 2,283 (4.2%)		Phillip Oppenheim
Bolsover	**Dennis Skinner** **35,073 (74.0%)**	Richard Harwood 7,924 (16.7%)	Ian Cox 4,417 (9.3%)			Dennis Skinner
Chesterfield	**Tony Benn** **26,105 (50.8%)**	Martin Potter 4,752 (9.2%)	Anthony Rogers 20,330 (39.6%)		Norman Scarth (Ind.) 202 (0.4%)	Tony Benn
Derby North	**Bob Laxton** **29,844 (53.2%)**	Gregory Knight 19,229 (34.3%)	Robert Charlesworth 5,059 (9.0%)	Paul Reynolds 1,816 (3.2%)	Jane Waters (PLA) 195 (0.3%)	Gregory Knight
Derby South	**Margaret Beckett** **29,154 (56.3%)**	Javed Arain 13,048 (25.2%)	Jeremy Beckett 7,438 (14.4%)	John K. Browne 1,862 (3.6%)	Rob Evans (ND) 317 (0.6%)	Margaret Beckett
Erewash	**Liz Blackman** **31,196 (51.7%)**	Angela Knight 22,061 (36.6%)	Martin Garnett 5,181 (8.6%)	Stephen Stagg 1,404 (2.3%)	Matthew Simmons (SLP) 496 (0.8%)	Angela Knight
High Peak	**Tom Levitt** **29,052 (50.8%)**	Charles Hendry 20,261 (35.5%)	Sue Barber 6,420 (11.2%)	Colin Hanson-Orr 1,420 (2.5%)		Charles Hendry
North East Derbyshire	**Harry Barnes** **31,425 (60.5%)**	Simon Elliott 13,104 (25.2%)	Stephen Hardy 7,450 (14.3%)			Harry Barnes
South Derbyshire	**Mark Todd** **32,709 (54.5%)**	Edwina Currie 18,742 (31.3%)	Robert Renold 5,408 (9.0%)	Richard North 2,491 (4.2%)	Ian Crompton (UKIP) 617 (1.0%)	Edwina Currie
West Derbyshire	Stephen J. Clamp 19,060 (33.5%)	**Patrick McLoughlin** **23,945 (42.1%)**	Christopher Seeley 9,940 (17.5%)	John Gouriet 2,499 (4.4%)	Godfrey Meynell (Ind. Grn.) 593 (1.0%) Hugh Price (UKIP) 484 (0.9%) "The Flying Brick" Delves (OMRLP) 281 (0.5%) Martin Kyslun (Ind.) (Note: Independent Back to Basics) 81 (0.1%)	Patrick McLoughlin

==== Leicestershire and Rutland ====
Leicestershire and Rutland elected 10 Members of Parliament in 10 seats – 3 borough and 7 county constituencies.

Constituency	Candidates					Incumbent
Constituency	Labour	Conservative	Liberal Democrat	Referendum	Other	Incumbent
Blaby	Ross Willmott 18,090 (33.8%)	**Andrew Robathan** **24,564 (45.8%)**	Geoff Welsh 8,001 (14.9%)	Robert Harrison 2,018 (3.8%)	John Peacock (BNP) 523 (1.0%) Terence Stokes (Ind.) 397 (0.7%)	Andrew Robathan
Bosworth	Andrew Furlong 20,162 (38.7%)	**David Tredinnick** **21,189 (40.6%)**	Jon Ellis 9,281 (17.8%)	Scott Halborg 1,521 (2.9%)		David Tredinnick
Charnwood	David Knaggs 20,210 (36.0%)	**Stephen Dorrell** **26,110 (46.5%)**	Roger Wilson 7,224 (12.9%)	Hugh Meechan 2,104 (3.7%)	Matthew Palmer (BNP) 525 (0.9%)	New constituency
Harborough	Nick Holden 13,332 (25.2%)	**Edward Garnier** **22,170 (41.8%)**	Mark Cox 15,646 (29.5%)	Neil Wright 1,859 (3.5%)		Edward Garnier
Leicester East	**Keith Vaz** **29,083 (65.50%)**	Simon Milton 10,661 (24.01%)	Jay Matabudul 3,105 (6.99%)	Philip Iwaniw 1,015 (2.29%)	Sohan Singh Sidhu (SLP) 436 (0.98%) Neil Slack (Ind.) 102 (0.23%)	Keith Vaz
Leicester South	**Jim Marshall** **27,914 (58.0%)**	Chris Heaton-Harris 11,421 (23.7%)	Barry Coles 6,654 (13.8%)	John Hancock 1,184 (2.5%)	Jim Dooher (SLP) 634 (1.3%) Kevin Sills (ND) 307 (0.6%)	Jim Marshall
Leicester West	**Patricia Hewitt** **22,580 (55.2%)**	Richard Thomas 9,716 (23.7%)	Mark Jones 5,795 (14.2%)	William Shooter 970 (2.4%)	Geoff Forse (Green) 586 (1.4%) David Roberts (SLP) 452 (1.1%) Josephine Nicholls (SP) 327 (0.8%) Adrian Belshaw (BNP) 302 (0.7%) Clive Potter (ND) 186 (0.5%)	Greville Janner†
Loughborough	**Andy Reed** **25,448 (48.6%)**	Ken Andrews 19,736 (37.7%)	Diana Brass 6,190 (11.8%)	Rama P. Gupta 991 (1.9%)		Stephen Dorrell‡
North West Leicestershire	**David Taylor** **29,332 (56.4%)**	Robert Goodwill 16,113 (31.0%)	Stan Heptinstall 4,492 (8.6%)	Maurice Abney-Hastings 2,008 (4.0%)		David Ashby†
Rutland and Melton	John Meads 15,271 (29.0%)	**Alan Duncan** **24,107 (45.8%)**	Kim Lee 10,112 (19.2%)	Rupert King 2,317 (4.4%)	Jeff Abbott (UKIP) 823 (1.6%)	Alan Duncan

==== Lincolnshire ====
Lincolnshire elected 7 Members of Parliament in 7 seats – 1 borough and 6 county constituencies. This excludes (North Lincolnshire and North East Lincolnshire) which are included as part of Humberside.

Constituency	Candidates					Incumbent
Constituency	Labour	Conservative	Liberal Democrat	Referendum	Other	Incumbent
Boston and Skegness	Philip McCauley 19,103 (41.0%)	**Richard Body** **19,750 (42.4%)**	John Meads 7,721 (16.6%)			Richard Body (Holland with Boston)
Gainsborough	Paul Taylor 13,767 (28.8%)	**Edward Leigh** **20,593 (43.1%)**	Neil Taylor 13,436 (28.1%)			Edward Leigh (Gainsborough and Horncastle)
Grantham and Stamford	Peter Denning 19,980 (37.7%)	**Quentin Davies** **22,672 (42.8%)**	John Sellick 6,612 (12.5%)	Marilyn Swain 2,721 (5.1%)	Malcolm Charlesworth (UKIP) 556 (1.0%) Rosa Clark (PLA) 314 (0.6%) Ian Harper (NLP) 115 (0.2%)	New constituency
Lincoln	**Gillian Merron** **25,563 (54.9%)**	Tony Brown 14,433 (31.0%)	Lisa Gabriel 5,048 (10.8%)	John Ivory 1,329 (2.9%)	Adrian Myers (NLP) 175 (0.4%)	Kenneth Carlisle†
Louth and Horncastle	John Hough 14,799 (29.6%)	**Peter Tapsell** **21,699 (43.4%)**	Fiona Martin 12,207 (24.4%)		Rosemary Robinson (Green) 1,248 (2.5%)	Peter Tapsell (East Lindsey)
Sleaford and North Hykeham	Sean Hariss 18,235 (34.3%)	**Douglas Hogg** **23,358 (43.9%)**	John Marriott 8,063 (15.2%)	Peter Clery 2,942 (5.5%)	Richard Overton (Ind. Con.) 578 (1.1%)	Douglas Hogg (Grantham)
South Holland and The Deepings	John Lewis 16,700 (33.3%)	**John Hayes** **24,691 (49.3%)**	Peter Millen 7,836 (15.6%)		Guy Erwood (Ind. Con.) 902 (1.8%)	New constituency

==== Northamptonshire ====
Northamptonshire elected 6 Members of Parliament in 6 seats – 2 borough and 4 county constituencies.

Constituency	Candidates					Incumbent
Constituency	Labour	Conservative	Liberal Democrat	Referendum	Other	Incumbent
Corby	**Phil Hope** **29,888 (55.4%)**	William Powell 18,028 (33.4%)	Ian Hankison 4,045 (7.5%)	Sebastian Riley-Smith 1,356 (2.5%)	Ian Gillman (UKIP) 507 (0.9%) Jane Bence (NLP) 133 (0.2%)	William Powell
Daventry	Ken Ritchie 21,237 (34.4%)	**Tim Boswell** **28,615 (46.3%)**	John Gordon 9,233 (15.0%)	Barbara Russocki 2,018 (3.3%)	B.J. Mahoney (UKIP) 443 (0.7%) Russell B. France (NLP) 204 (0.3%)	Tim Boswell
Kettering	**Phil Sawford** **24,650 (43.3%)**	Roger Freeman 24,461 (43.0%)	Roger Aron 6,098 (10.7%)	Arthur E. Smith 1,551 (2.7%)	Rosemary le Carpentier (NLP) 197 (0.3%)	Roger Freeman
Northampton North	**Sally Keeble** **27,247 (52.7%)**	Tony Marlow 17,247 (33.4%)	L. Dunbar 6,579 (12.7%)		D. Torbica (UKIP) 474 (0.9%) B. Spivack (NLP) 161 (0.3%)	Tony Marlow
Northampton South	**Tony Clarke** **24,214 (42.4%)**	Michael Morris 23,470 (41.1%)	Anthony W. Worgan 6,316 (11.1%)	Christopher C. Petrie 1,405 (2.5%)	Derek Clark (UKIP) 1,159 (2.0%) Graham D. Woollcombe (NLP) 541 (0.9%)	Michael Morris
Wellingborough	**Paul Stinchcombe** **24,854 (44.2%)**	Peter Fry 24,667 (43.8%)	Peter Smith 5,279 (9.4%)		Tony Ellwood (UKIP) 1,192 (2.1%) Annie Lorys (NLP) 297 (0.5%)	Peter Fry

==== Nottinghamshire ====
Nottinghamshire elected 11 Members of Parliament in 11 seats – 3 borough and 8 county constituencies.

Constituency	Candidates					Incumbent
Constituency	Labour	Conservative	Liberal Democrat	Referendum	Other	Incumbent
Ashfield	**Geoff Hoon** **32,979 (65.1%)**	Mark Simmonds 10,251 (20.3%)	William E. Smith 4,882 (20.3%)	Martin I. Betts 1,896 (3.8%)	Steven E. Belshaw (BNP) 595 (1.2%)	Geoff Hoon
Bassetlaw	**Joe Ashton** **29,298 (61.1%)**	Martyn Cleasby 11,950 (24.9%)	Mike Kerringan 4,950 (10.3%)	Roy Graham 1,838 (3.8%)		Joe Ashton
Broxtowe	**Nick Palmer** **27,343 (47.0%)**	Jim Lester 21,768 (37.4%)	Terence P. Miller 6,934 (11.9%)	Roy Tucker 2,092 (3.6%)		Jim Lester
Gedling	**Vernon Coaker** **24,390 (46.8%)**	Andrew Mitchell 20,588 (39.5%)	Raymond Poynter 5,180 (9.9%)	John Connor 2,006 (3.9%)		Andrew Mitchell
Mansfield	**Alan Meale** **30,556 (64.4%)**	Tim Frost 10,038 (21.2%)	Phil Smith 5,244 (11.1%)	Jim Bogusz 1,588 (3.3%)		Alan Meale
Newark	**Fiona Jones** **23,496 (45.2%)**	Richard Alexander 20,480 (39.4%)	Peter Harris 5,960 (11.5%)	Graham Creedy 2,035 (3.9%)		Richard Alexander
Nottingham East	**John Heppell** **24,755 (62.3%)**	Andrew Raca 9,336 (23.5%)	Kevin Mulloy 4,008 (10.1%)	Ben Brown 1,645 (4.1%)		John Heppell
Nottingham North	**Graham Allen** **27,203 (65.7%)**	Gillian Shaw 8,402 (20.3%)	Rachel Oliver 3,301 (8.0%)	Joe Neal 1,858 (4.5%)	Andy Belfield (SP) 637 (1.5%)	Graham Allen
Nottingham South	**Alan Simpson** **26,825 (55.3%)**	Brian Kirsch 13,461 (27.7%)	Gary Long 6,265 (12.9%)	Ken Thompson 1,523 (3.1%)	Sharron Edwards (ND) 446 (0.9%)	Alan Simpson
Rushcliffe	Jocelyn Pettitt 22,503 (36.2%)	**Kenneth Clarke** **27,558 (44.4%)**	Sam Boote 8,851 (14.3%)	Catherine Chadd 2,682 (4.3%)	Joseph Moore (UKIP) 403 (0.7%) Anna Miszewska (NLP) 115 (0.2%)	Kenneth Clarke
Sherwood	**Paddy Tipping** **33,071 (58.5%)**	Roland Spencer 16,259 (28.8%)	Bruce Moult 4,889 (8.6%)	Lee Slack 1,882 (3.3%)	Paul Ballard (BNP) 432 (0.8%)	Paddy Tipping

=== East of England ===
The East of England elected 56 Members of Parliament across 6 counties; Bedfordshire, Cambridgeshire, Essex, Hertfordshire, Norfolk and Suffolk.

==== Bedfordshire ====
Bedfordshire elected 6 Members of Parliament in 6 seats – 3 borough and 3 county constituencies.

Constituency	Candidates					Incumbent
Constituency	Labour	Conservative	Liberal Democrat	Referendum	Other	Incumbent
Bedford	**Patrick Hall** **25,860 (50.6%)**	Bob Blackman 16,474 (33.7%)	Christopher Noyce 6,044 (12.3%)	Peter Conquest 1,503 (3.1%)	Patricia Saunders (NLP) 149 (0.3%)	New constituency
Luton North	**Kelvin Hopkins** **25,860 (54.6%)**	David Senior 16,234 (34.3%)	Kathryn Newbound 4,299 (9.1%)		Colin Brown (UKIP) 689 (1.5%) Aaron Custance (NLP) 250 (0.5%)	John Carlisle†
Luton South	**Margaret Moran** **26,428 (54.8%)**	Graham Bright 15,109 (31.4%)	Keith Fitchett 4,610 (9.6%)	Clive Jacobs 1,205 (2.5%)	Charlie Lawman (UKIP) 390 (0.8%) Marc Scheimann (Green) 356 (0.7%) Claire Perrin (NLP) 86 (0.2%)	Graham Bright
Mid Bedfordshire	Neil Mallett 17,086 (32.5%)	**Jonathan Sayeed** **24,176 (46.0%)**	Tim Hill 8,823 (16.8%)	Shirley Marler 2,257 (4.3%)	Marek J. Lorys (NLP) 174 (0.3%)	Nicholas Lyell‡
North East Bedfordshire	John Lehal 16,428 (32.6%)	**Nicholas Lyell** **22,311 (44.3%)**	Philip Bristow 7,179 (14.2%)	John Taylor 2,490 (4.9%)	Frank Foley (Ind. Con.) 1,842 (3.7%) Bernard Bence (NLP) 138 (0.3%)	Trevor Skeet (North Bedfordshire)
South West Bedfordshire	Andrew Date 21,402 (40.5%)	**David Madel** **21,534 (40.7%)**	Stephen Owen 7,559 (14.3%)	Rosalind Hill 1,761 (3.3%)	Tom Wise (UKIP) 446 (0.8%) Alexander Le Carpentier (NLP) 162 (0.3%)	David Madel

==== Cambridgeshire ====
Cambridgeshire elected 7 Members of Parliament in 7 seats – 2 borough constituencies and 5 county constituencies.

Constituency	Candidates					Incumbent
Constituency	Labour	Conservative	Liberal Democrat	Referendum	Other	Incumbent
Cambridge	**Anne Campbell** **27,436 (53.4%)**	David Platt 13,299 (25.9%)	Geoffrey Heathcock 8,287 (16.1%)	William Burrows 1,262 (2.5%)	Margaret Wright (Green) 1,434 (1.3%) Anna Johnstone (PLA) 191 (0.4%) Raymond Athow (WRP) 107 (0.2%) M. Gladwin (NLP) 103 (0.2%)	Anne Campbell
Huntingdon	Jason Reece 13,361 (23.5%)	**John Major** **31,501 (55.3%)**	Matthew Owen 8,390 (14.7%)	David Bellamy 3,114 (5.5%)	Charles Coyne (UKIP) 331 (0.6%) Veronica Hufford (Christian Democrat) 177 (0.3% Duncan Robertson (Ind.) 89 (0.2%)	John Major
North East Cambridgeshire	Virginia Bucknor 18,754 (33.8%)	**Malcolm Moss** **23,855 (43.0%)**	Andrew Nash 9,070 (16.4%)	Michael W. Bacon 2,636 (4.8%)	Chris J. Bennett (SLP) 851 (1.5%) Luke K.C. Leighton (NLP) 259 (0.5%)	Malcolm Moss
North West Cambridgeshire	Lee Steptoe 15,734 (32.2%)	**Brian Mawhinney** **23,488 (48.1%)**	Barbara McCoy 7,388 (15.1%)	Sandy Watts 1,939 (4.0%)	William Wyatt (UKIP) 269 (0.6%)	New constituency
Peterborough	**Helen Brinton** **24,365 (50.3%)**	Jacqueline Foster 17,042 (35.2%)	David Howarth 5,170 (10.7%)	Philip Slater 924 (1.91%)	Charles Brettell (NLP) 334 (0.7%) John Linskey (UKIP) 317 (0.7%) Stephen Goldspink (PLA) 275 (0.6%)	Brian Mawhinney‡
South Cambridgeshire	Tony Gray 13,485 (25.1%)	**Andrew Lansley** **22,572 (42.0%)**	James A. Quinlan 13,860 (25.8%)	Robin Page 3,300 (6.1%)	John Linskey (UKIP) 298 (0.6%) Francis C. Chalmers (NLP) 168 (0.3%)	Anthony Grant† (South West Cambridgeshire)
South East Cambridgeshire	Rex Collinson 15,048 (26.5%)	**Jim Paice** **24,397 (42.9%)**	Sal Brinton 14,246 (25.1%)	John Howlett 2,838 (5.0%)	Karl Lams (Building a Fair Society) 167 (0.3%) Peter While (NLP) 111 (0.2%)	Jim Paice

==== Essex ====
Essex elected 17 Members of Parliament in 17 seats – 5 borough constituencies and 12 county constituencies.

Constituency	Candidates					Incumbent
Constituency	Labour	Conservative	Liberal Democrat	Referendum	Other	Incumbent
Basildon	**Angela Smith** **29,646 (55.8%)**	John Baron 16,366 (30.8%)	Lindsay Granshaw 4,608 (8.7%)	Craig Robinson 2,462 (4.6%)		David Amess‡
Billericay	Paul Richards 20,677 (37.3%)	**Teresa Gorman** **22,033 (39.8%)**	Geoff Williams 8,763 (15.8%)		Brian Hughes (Loyal Conservative) 3,377 (6.1%) John Buchanan (PLA) 570 (1.0%)	Teresa Gorman
Braintree	**Alan Hurst** **23,729 (42.7%)**	Tony Newton 22,278 (40.1%)	Trevor K. Ellis 6,418 (11.6%)	Nicholas P. Westcott 2,165 (3.9%)	James Abbott (Green) 712 (1.3%) Michael Nolan (Ind.) 274 (0.5%)	Tony Newton
Brentwood and Ongar	Marc Young 11,231 (22.1%)	**Eric Pickles** **23,031 (45.4%)**	Elizabeth Bottomley 13,341 (26.3%)	Angela Kilmartin 2,658 (5.2%)	David Mills (UKIP) 465 (0.9%)	Eric Pickles
Castle Point	**Christine Butler** **20,605 (42.4%)**	Bob Spink 19,462 (40.1%)	Michael Baker 4,477 (9.2%)	Hugh Maulkin 2,700 (5.6%)	Linda Kendall (Ind.) 1,301 (2.7%)	Bob Spink
Colchester	Rod Green 15,891 (30.5%)	Stephan Shakespeare 16,335 (31.4%)	**Bob Russell** **17,886 (34.4%)**	John Hazell 1,776 (3.4%)	Loretta Basker (NLP) 148 (0.3%)	New constituency
Epping Forest	Stephen Murray 18,865 (35.6%)	**Eleanor Laing** **24,117 (45.5%)**	Stephen Robinson 7,074 (13.3%)		Michael Baker (BNP) 743 (1.4%)	Steven Norris†
Harlow	**Bill Rammell** **25,861 (54.1%)**	Jerry Hayes 15,347 (32.1%)	Lorna Spenceley 4,523 (9.5%)	Mark Wells 1,422 (3.0%)	Gerard Batten (UKIP) 340 (0.7%) John Bowles (BNP) 319 (0.7%)	Jerry Hayes
Harwich	**Ivan Henderson** **20,740 (38.8%)**	Iain Sproat 19,524 (36.5%)	Ann M. Elvin 7,037 (13.1%)	Jeffrey Titford 4,923 (9.2%)	Ralph Knight (Ind.) 1,290 (2.4%)	Iain Sproat
Maldon and East Chelmsford	Kevin Freeman 14,485 (28.8%)	**John Whittingdale** **24,524 (48.7%)**	Graham Pooley 9,758 (19.4%)		Leonard Overy-Owen (UKIP) 935 (1.9%) Eleanor Burgess (Green) 685 (1.4%)	John Whittingdale‡ (South Colchester and Maldon)
North Essex	Timothy Young 17,004 (33.2%)	**Bernard Jenkin** **22,480 (43.9%)**	Andrew Phillips 10,028 (20.0%)		Roger Lord (UKIP) 1,202 (2.3%) Susan Ransome (Green) 495 (1.0%)	Bernard Jenkin‡ (Colchester North)
Rayleigh	Raymond Ellis 14,832 (28.9%)	**Michael Clark** **25,516 (49.7%)**	Sid Cumberland 10,137 (19.8%)		Alan Farmer (Liberal) 829 (1.6%)	Michael Clark‡ (Rochford)
Rochford and Southend East	Nigel Smith 18,458 (39.7%)	**Teddy Taylor** **22,683 (48.7%)**	Paula Smith 4,387 (9.4%)		Brian Lynch (Liberal) 1,007 (2.2%)	Teddy Taylor‡ (Southend East)
Saffron Walden	Malcolm J. Fincken 12,275 (21.5%)	**Alan Haselhurst** **25,871 (45.3%)**	Melvin H. Caton 15,298 (26.8%)	Richard Glover 2,308 (4.0%)	Ian Evans (UKIP) 658 (1.2%) Barry Tyler (Ind.) 486 (0.9%) Christopher Edwards (NLP) 154 (0.3%)	Alan Haselhurst
Southend West	Alan Harley 10,600 (22.8%)	**David Amess** **18,029 (38.8%)**	Nina Stimson 15,414 (33.1%)	Charles Webster 1,734 (3.7%)	Brian Lee (UKIP) 636 (1.4%) Peter Warburton (NLP) 101 (0.2%)	Steven Norris†
Thurrock	**Andrew MacKinlay** **29,896 (63.3%)**	Andrew Rosindell 12,640 (26.8%)	Joe White 3,843 (8.1%)		Peter Compobassi (UKIP) 833 (1.8%)	Andrew MacKinlay
West Chelmsford	Roy Chad 15,463 (26.4%)	**Simon Burns** **23,781 (40.6%)**	Martin Bracken 17,090 (29.2%)	Terence Smith 1,536 (2.6%)	George Rumens (Green) 411 (0.7%) Martin Levin (UKIP) 323 (0.6%)	Simon Burns‡ (Chelmsford)

==== Hertfordshire ====
Hertfordshire elected 11 Members of Parliament in 11 seats – 2 borough constituencies and 9 county constituencies.

Constituency	Candidates					Incumbent
Constituency	Labour	Conservative	Liberal Democrat	Referendum	Other	Incumbent
Broxbourne	Benjamin Coleman 16,299 (34.7%)	**Marion Roe** **22,952 (48.8%)**	Julia Davies 5,310 (11.3%)	David Millward 1,633 (3.5%)	George Rumens (BNP) 610 (1.3%) Benjamin Cheetham (NLP) 172 (0.4%)	Marion Roe
Hemel Hempstead	**Tony McWalter** **25,175 (45.7%)**	Robert Jones 21,539 (39.1%)	Patricia Lindsley 6,789 (12.3%)	Peter Such 1,327 (2.4%)	Diana M. Harding (NLP) 262 (0.5%)	Robert Jones‡ (West Hertfordshire)
Hertford and Stortford	Simon Spellar 17,142 (31.4%)	**Bowen Wells** **24,027 (44.1%)**	Michael Wood 9,679 (17.7%)	Hugo Page Croft 2,105 (3.9%)	B G Smalley (UKIP) 1,233 (2.2%) Michael Franey (PLA) 259 (0.5%)	Bowen Wells
Hertsmere	Beth Kelly 19,230 (38.2%)	**James Clappison** **22,305 (44.3%)**	Ann Gray 6,466 (12.8%)	James Marlow 1,703 (3.4%)	Rodney Saunders (UKIP) 453 (0.9%) Nigel Kahn (NLP) 191 (0.4%)	James Clappison
Hitchin and Harpenden	Rosemary Sanderson 17,367 (33.1%)	**Peter Lilley** **24,038 (45.9%)**	Chris J. White 10,515 (20.1%)		David R.H. Cooke (NLP) 290 (0.6%) Jim D.O. Horton (SP) 217 (0.4%)	New constituency
North East Hertfordshire	Ivan Gibbons 18,624 (35.8%)	**Oliver Heald** **21,712 (41.7%)**	Stephen Jarvis 9,493 (18.2%)	Jonathan Grose 2,166 (4.2%)		Oliver Heald‡ (North Hertfordshire)
South West Hertfordshire	Mark Wilson 15,441 (27.9%)	**Richard Page** **25,462 (46.0%)**	Ann Shaw 12,381 (22.3%)	Timothy Millward 1,853 (3.3%)	Christopher Adamson (NLP) 274 (0.5%)	Richard Page
St Albans	**Kerry Pollard** **21,338 (42.0%)**	David Rutley 16,879 (33.2%)	Anthony Rowlands 10,692 (21.0%)	Jim Warrilow 1,619 (3.2%)	Sari Craigen (RDT) 290 (0.6%) Ian Docker (NLP) 111 (0.2%)	Peter Lilley‡ (Hitchin and Harpenden)
Stevenage	**Barbara Follett** **28,440 (55.4%)**	Timothy Wood 16,858 (32.8%)	Alexander Iain Cameron Wilcock 4,588 (8.9%)	Jeffery Michael Coburn 1,194 (2.3%)	David William Bundy (PLA) 196 (0.4%) Andrew Brinley Michael Calcraft (NLP) 110 (0.2%)	Timothy Wood
Watford	**Claire Ward** **25,109 (45.3%)**	Robert Gordon 19,227 (34.8%)	Andrew Canning 9,272 (16.8%)	Philip Roe 1,484 (2.7%)	Leslie Davis (NLP) 234 (0.4%)	Tristan Garel-Jones†
Welwyn Hatfield	**Melanie Johnson** **24,936 (47.1%)**	David Evans 19,341 (36.5%)	Rodney Schwartz 7,161 (13.5%)		Victor Cox (RA) 1,263 (2.4%) Helen Harrold (PLA) 267 (0.5%)	David Evans

==== Norfolk ====
Norfolk elected 8 Members of Parliament in 8 seats – 2 borough constituencies and 6 county constituencies.

Constituency	Candidates					Incumbent
Constituency	Labour	Conservative	Liberal Democrat	Referendum	Other	Incumbent
Great Yarmouth	**Tony Wright** **26,084 (53.4%)**	Michael Carttiss 17,416 (35.6%)	Derek Wood 5,381 (11.0%)			Michael Carttiss
Mid Norfolk	Daniel Zeichner 21,403 (37.3%)	**Keith Simpson** **22,739 (39.6%)**	Susan Frary 8,617 (15.0%)	Nigel Holder 3,229 (5.6%)	Tony Park (Green) 1,254 (2.1%) Bruce Parker (NLP) 215 (0.4%)	Richard Ryder†
North Norfolk	Michael Cullingham 14,736 (25.1%)	**David Prior** **21,456 (36.5%)**	Norman Lamb 20,163 (34.3%)	John Allen 2,458 (4.2%)		Ralph Howell†
North West Norfolk	**George Turner** **25,250 (43.8%)**	Henry Bellingham 23,911 (41.5%)	Evelyn Knowles 5,513 (9.6%)	Roger Percival 2,923 (5.1%)		Henry Bellingham
Norwich North	Ian Gibson **27,346 (49.7%)**	Robert Kinghorn 17,876 (32.5%)	Paul Young 6,951 (12.6%)	Tony Bailey-Smith 1,777 (3.2%)	Howard Marks (LCA) 512 (0.9%) James Hood (SLP) 495 (0.9%) Diana Mills (NLP) 100 (0.2%)	Patrick Thompson†
Norwich South	**Charles Clarke** **26,267 (51.7%)**	Bashir Khanbhai 12,028 (23.7%)	Andrew Aalders-Dunthorne 9,457 (18.6%)	David Holdsworth 1,464 (2.9%)	Howard Marks (LCA) 765 (1.5%) Adrian Holmes (Green) 736 (1.4%) Bryan Parsons (NLP) 84 (0.2%)	John Garrett†
South Norfolk	Jane Ross 16,188 (26.1%)	**John MacGregor** **24,935 (40.2%)**	Barbara Hacker 17,557 (28.3%)	Patricia Bateson 2,533 (4.1%)	Stephanie Ross-Wagenknecht (Green) 484 (0.8%) Anthony Boddy (UKIP) 400 (0.6%)	John MacGregor
South West Norfolk	Adrian Heffernan 22,230 (37.8%)	**Gillian Shephard** **24,694 (42.0%)**	David J. Bucton 8,178 (13.9%)	Ronnie J. B. Hoar 3,694 (6.3%)		Gillian Shephard

==== Suffolk ====
Suffolk elected 7 Members of Parliament in 7 seats – 1 borough constituency and 6 county constituencies.

Constituency	Candidates					Incumbent
Constituency	Labour	Conservative	Liberal Democrat	Referendum	Other	Incumbent
Bury St Edmunds	Mark Ereira-Guyer 20,922 (37.7%)	**David Ruffley** **21,290 (38.3%)**	David A. Cooper 10,102 (18.2%)	Ian C. H. McWhirter 2,939 (5.3%)	Joanna B. Lillis (NLP) 272 (0.5%)	Richard Spring†
Central Suffolk and North Ipswich	Carol Jones 18,955 (35.9%)	**Michael Lord** **22,493 (42.6%)**	Minone Goldspink 10,886 (20.6%)		Stephanie A. Bennell (Ind. Con.) 489 (0.9%)	Michael Lord‡ (Central Suffolk)
Ipswich	**Jamie Cann** **25,484 (52.7%)**	Stephen Castle 15,048 (31.1%)	Nigel Roberts 5,881 (12.2%)	Theodore Agnew 1,637 (3.4%)	William Vinyard (UKIP) 208 (0.4%) Eric Kaplan (NLP) 107 (0.2%)	Jamie Cann
South Suffolk	Paul A. Bishop 15,227 (29.3%)	Tim Yeo **19,402 (37.3%)**	Kathy Pollard 14,395 (27.7%)	Somerset Carlo de Chair 2,740 (5.3%)	Angela Holland (NLP) 211 (0.4%)	Richard Spring
Suffolk Coastal	Mark Campbell 18,442 (32.8%)	**John Gummer** **21,696 (38.6%)**	Alexandra Jones 12,036 (21.4%)	Stephen Caulfield 3,416 (6.1%)	Anthony Slade (Green) 514 (0.9%) Felicity Kaplan (NLP) 152 (0.3%)	John Gummer
Waveney	**Bob Blizzard** **31,486 (56.0%)**	David Porter 19,393 (34.5%)	Christopher Thomas 5,054 (9.0%)		Neil Clark (Ind.) 318 (0.6%)	David Porter
West Suffolk	Michael Jefferys 18,214 (37.1%)	**Richard Spring** **20,081 (40.9%)**	Adrian Graves 6,892 (14.0%)	James J. T. Carver 3,724 (7.6%)	Alistair J. M. Shearer (NLP) 171 (0.3%)	New constituency

=== Greater London ===
Greater London elected 74 Members of Parliament across the 32 boroughs of London.

==== North East London ====
North East London elected 23 Members of Parliament across the boroughs of Enfield, Haringey, Islington, Hackney, Tower Hamlets, Newham, Waltham Forest, Redbridge, Barking and Dagenham and Havering.

Constituency	Candidates					Incumbent
Constituency	Labour	Conservative	Liberal Democrat	Referendum	Other	Incumbent
Barking	Margaret Hodge **21,698 (65.8%)**	Keith Langford 5,802 (17.6%)	Mark Marsh 3,128 (9.5%)	Colin Taylor 1,283 (3.9%)	Mark Tolman (BNP) 894 (2.7%) Damien Mearns (PLA) 159 (0.5%)	Margaret Hodge
Bethnal Green and Bow	**Oona King** **20,697 (46.3%)**	Kabir Choudhury 9,412 (21.1%)	Syed Dulu 5,361 (12.0%)	Muhammed Abdullah 557 (1.2%)	David King (BNP) 3,350 (7.5%) Terry Milson (Liberal) 2,963 (6.6%) Sheref Osman (Ind.) 1,117 (2.5%) Stephen Petter (Green) 812 (1.8%) Abdul Hamid (SLP) 413 (0.9%)	Peter Shore† (Bethnal Green and Stepney)
Chingford and Woodford Green	Tommy Hutchinson 15,395 (34.6%)	**Iain Duncan Smith** **21,109 (47.5%)**	Geoffrey Seeff 6,885 (15.5%)		Alan Gould (BNP) 1,059 (2.4%)	Iain Duncan Smith (Chingford)
Dagenham	**Judith Church** **23,759 (65.7%)**	James P.J. Fairrie 6,705 (18.5%)	Thomas Dobrashian 2,704 (7.5%)	Steven Kraft 1,411 (3.9%)	William Binding (BNP) 900 (2.5%) Richard H. Dawson (Ind.) 349 (1.0%) Michael B. Hipperson (ND) 183 (0.5%) Kathleen A. Goble (PLA) 152 (0.4%)	Judith Church
East Ham	**Stephen Timms** **25,779 (64.6%)**	Angela Bray 6,421 (16.1%)	Mike J. Sole 2,599 (6.5%)	Joy E. McCann 845 (2.1%)	Imran Khan (SLP) 2,697 (6.5%) Colin Smith (BNP) 1,258 (3.2%) Graham G. Hardy (ND) 290 (0.7%)	Stephen Timms‡ (Newham North East)
Edmonton	Andy Love **27,029 (60.28%)**	Ian Twinn 13,557 (30.24%)	Andrew Wiseman 2,847 (6.35%)	James Wright 708 (1.58%)	Bruce Cowd (BNP) 437 (0.98%) Penelope Weald (UKIP) 260 (0.58%)	Ian Twinn
Enfield North	**Joan Ryan** **24,138 (50.7%)**	Mark Field 17,326 (36.4%)	Mike Hopkins 4,264 (9.0%)	Robert Ellingham 857 (1.8%)	Jean Griffin (BNP) 590 (1.2%) Jose O'Ware (UKIP) 484 (1.0%)	Tim Eggar†
Enfield Southgate	**Stephen Twigg** **20,570 (44.2%)**	Michael Portillo 19,137 (41.1%)	Jeremy Browne 4,966 (10.7%)	Nicholas Luard 1,342 (2.9%)	Alan Storkey (Christ. Dem.) 289 (0.6%) Andrew Malakouna (Oth.) 229 (0.5%)	Michael Portillo
Hackney North and Stoke Newington	**Diane Abbott** **21,110 (65.2%)**	Michael Lavender 5,483 (16.9%)	Douglas Taylor 3,306 (10.2%)	Brian Maxwell 544 (1.7%)	Yen Chit Chong (Green) 1,395 (4.3%) Dickon Tolson (Ind.) 368 (1.1%) Lisa Lovebucket (Ind.) 176 (0.5%)	Diane Abbott
Hackney South and Shoreditch	**Brian Sedgemore** **20,048 (59.4%)**	Christopher P. O'Leary 4,494 (13.3%)	Martin J. Pantling 5,058 (15.0%)	Richard Franklin 613 (1.8%)	Terry V. Betts (Ind.) 2,436 (7.2%) Gordon T. Callow (BNP) 531 (1.6%) Monty Goldman (CPB) 298 (0.9%) Michelle L. Goldberg (NLP) 145 (0.4%) William Rogers (WRP) 139 (0.4%)	Brian Sedgemore
Hornchurch	**John Cryer** **22,066 (50.2%)**	Robin Squire 16,386 (37.3%)	Rabi Martins 3,446 (7.8%)	Rory E.B. Khilkoff-Bouldi 1,595 (3.6%)	Jenny Trueman (Ind.) 259 (0.6%) Joseph Sowerby (PLA) 189 (0.4%)	Robin Squire
Hornsey and Wood Green	**Barbara Roche** **31,792 (61.7%)**	Helena D. Hart 11,293 (21.9%)	Lynne Featherstone 5,794 (11.3%)	Rachel Miller 808 (1.6%)	Hilary J. Jago (Green) 1,214 (2.4%) Pat W. Sikorski (SLP) 586 (1.1%)	Barbara Roche
Ilford North	**Linda Perham** **23,135 (47.4%)**	Vivian Bendall 19,911 (40.8%)	Alan Dean 5,049 (10.3%)		Paul Wilson (BNP) 755 (1.5%)	Vivian Bendall
Ilford South	**Mike Gapes** **29,273 (58.5%)**	Neil Thorne 15,073 (30.1%)	Aina Khan 3,152 (6.3%)	David Hodges 1,073 (2.1%)	Bruce G. Ramsey (SLP) 868 (1.7%) Aron Owens (BNP) 580 (1.2%)	Mike Gapes
Islington North	**Jeremy Corbyn** **24,834 (69.3%)**	Simon Fawthrop 4,631 (12.9%)	James Kempton 4,879 (13.6%)		Christopher Ashby (Green) 1,516 (4.2%)	Jeremy Corbyn
Islington South and Finsbury	**Chris Smith** **22,079 (62.5%)**	David Berens 4,587 (13.0%)	Sarah Ludford 7,516 (21.3%)	Jane Bryett 741 (2.1%)	Alan Laws (Ind.) 171 (0.5%) Martin Creese (NLP) 121 (0.5%) Erol Basarik (Ind.) 101 (0.3%)	Chris Smith
Leyton and Wanstead	**Harry Cohen** **23,922 (60.8%)**	Robert Vaudry 8,736 (22.2%)	Charles Anglin 5,920 (15.1%)		Sean Duffy (PLA) 488 (1.2%) Abdul Mian (Ind.) 256 (0.7%)	Harry Cohen‡ (Leyton)
Poplar and Canning Town	**Jim Fitzpatrick** **24,807 (63.2%)**	Bene't Steinberg 5,892 (15.0%)	Janet Ludlow 4,072 (10.4%)	Ian Hare 1,091 (2.8%)	John Tyndall (BNP) 2,849 (7.3%) Jacklyn Joseph (SLP) 551 (1.4%)	New constituency
Romford	**Eileen Gordon** **18,187 (43.2%)**	Michael Neubert 17,538 (41.6%)	Nigel Meyer 3,341 (7.9%)	Steven Ward 1,431 (3.4%)	Terry E. Hurlstone (Liberal) 1,100 (2.6%) Michael J. Carey (BNP) 522 (1.2%)	Michael Neubert
Tottenham	**Bernie Grant** **26,121 (69.3%)**	Andrew R. Scantlebury 5,921 (15.7%)	Neil Hughes 4,064 (10.8%)		Peter Budge (Green) 1,059 (2.8%) Leelan L. E. Tay (PLA) 210 (0.5%) Christopher F. Anglin (WRP) 181 (0.5%) Tania Kent (SEP) 148 (0.4%)	Bernie Grant
Upminster	**Keith Darvill** **19,095 (46.2%)**	Nicholas Bonsor 16,315 (39.5%)	Pamela G. Peskett 3,919 (9.5%)	Terry Murray 2,000 (4.8%)		Nicholas Bonsor
Walthamstow	**Neil Gerrard** **25,287 (63.1%)**	Jill Andrew 8,138 (20.3%)	Jane Jackson 5,491 (13.7%)	George Hargreaves 1,139 (2.8%)		Neil Gerrard
West Ham	**Tony Banks** **24,531 (72.9%)**	Mark MacGregor 5,037 (15.0%)	Samantha L.C. McDonough 2,479 (7.4%)		Michael J. Carey (BNP) 1,198 (3.6%) Toby Jug (OMRLP) 300 (0.9%) Jonathan P. Rainbow (RDT) 116 (0.3%)	Tony Banks‡ (Newham North West)

==== North West London ====
North West London elected 20 Members of Parliament across the boroughs of Hillingdon, Harrow, Brent, Ealing, Barnet, Camden, Hammersmith and Fulham, Kensington and Chelsea, the City of Westminster, and the City of London.

Constituency	Candidates					Incumbent
Constituency	Labour	Conservative	Liberal Democrat	Referendum	Other	Incumbent
Brent East	**Ken Livingstone** **23,748 (67.3%)**	Mark Francois 7,866 (22.3%)	Ian M. C. Hunter 2,751 (7.8%)		Stan E. Keable (SLP) 466 (1.3%) Andrew J. Shanks (PLA) 218 (0.6%) Claire M. Warrilow (RDT) 120 (0.3%) Martin Creese (NLP) 103 (0.3%)	Ken Livingstone
Brent North	**Barry Gardiner** **19,343 (50.7%)**	Rhodes Boyson 15,324 (40.2%)	Paul Lorber 3,104 (8.1%)		Tony F. Davids (NLP) 204 (0.5%) George F. Clark (RDT) 199 (0.5%)	Rhodes Boyson
Brent South	**Paul Boateng** **25,180 (73.0%)**	Stewart Jackson 5,489 (15.9%)	Julian Brazil 2,670 (7.7%)	Janet Phythian 497 (1.4%)	David Edler (Green) 389 (1.1%) Christopher Howard (RDT) 175 (0.5%) Anjali Kaul Mahaldar (NLP) 98 (0.3%)	Paul Boateng
Chipping Barnet	Geoff N. Cooke 20,282 (40.9%)	**Sydney Chapman** **21,317 (43.0%)**	Sean Hooker 6,121 (12.4%)	Victor G. Ribekow 1,190 (2.4%)	Brian L. Miskin (OMRLP) 253 (0.5%) Brian D. Scallan (PLA) 243 (0.5%) Diane Derksen (NLP) 159 (0.3%)	Sydney Chapman
Cities of London and Westminster	Kate Green 14,100 (35.1%)	**Peter Brooke** **18,981 (47.3%)**	Michael Dumigan 4,933 (12.3%)	Sir Alan Walters 1,161 (2.9%)	Patricia Wharton (Ind.) 266 (0.7%) Colin Merton (UKIP) 215 (0.5%) Richard Johnson (NLP) 176 (0.4%) Nicholas Walsh (OMRLP) 138 (0.3%) Gordon Webster (Hemp Coalition) 112 (0.3%) Jerry Sadowitz (RDT) 73 (0.2%)	Peter Brooke
Ealing, Acton and Shepherd's Bush	**Clive Soley** **28,052 (58.4%)**	Barbara Yerolemou 12,405 (25.8%)	Andrew Mitchell 5,163 (10.7%)	Christopher Winn 637 (1.3%)	Jack Gilbert (SLP) 635 (1.3%) Joseph Gomm (UKIP) 385 (0.8%) Paul Danon (PLA) 265 (0.6%) Christopher Beasley (GBP) 209 (0.4%) William Edwards (Christian Party) 163 (0.3%) Kevin Turner (NLP) 150 (0.3%)	George Young‡ (Ealing Acton)
Ealing North	**Stephen Pound** **29,904 (53.7%)**	Harry Greenway 20,744 (37.2%)	Anjam K. Gupta 3,887 (7.0%)		G. M. Slysz (UKIP) 689 (1.2%) Astra Seibe (Green) 502 (0.9%)	George Young
Ealing Southall	**Piara Khabra** **29,904 (60.0%)**	John Penrose 11,368 (20.8%)	Nikki F. Thomson 5,687 (10.4%)	Bruce Cherry 854 (1.6%)	Harpal Brar (SLP) 2,107 (3.9%) Nicholas Goodwin (Green) 934 (1.7%) Kinga M. Klepacka (PLA) 473 (0.9%) Richard G.C. Mead (UKIP) 428 (0.8%)	Piara Khabra
Finchley and Golders Green	**Rudi Vis** **23,180 (46.1%)**	John Marshall 19,991 (39.7%)	Jonathan M. Davies 5,670 (11.3%)	Gary D. Shaw 684 (1.4%)	Ashley Gunstock (Green) 576 (1.1%) David N.G. Barraclough (UKIP) 205 (0.4%)	John Marshall‡ (Hendon South)
Hammersmith and Fulham	**Iain Coleman** **25,262 (46.8%)**	Matthew Carrington 21,420 (39.6%)	Alexi Sugden 4,727 (8.8%)	Moyra Bremner 1,023 (1.9%)	William Johnson-Smith (New Labour) 695 (1.3%) Elizabeth Streeter (Green) 562 (1.0%) Gerald Roberts (UKIP) 183 (0.3%) Alexander Phillips (NLP) 79 (0.1%) Andrew Elston (Care in the Community) 74 (0.1%)	Clive Soley‡ (Hammersmith); Matthew Carrington‡ (Fulham)
Hampstead and Highgate	**Glenda Jackson** **25,275 (57.4%)**	Elizabeth M. Gibson 11,991 (27.2%)	Bridget Fox 5,481 (12.4%)	Monima Siddique 667 (1.5%)	Jonathan Leslie (NLP) 147 (0.3%) Ronnie Carroll (RDT) 141(0.3%) P. Prince (UKIP) 123 (0.3%) Robert J. Harris (Humanist) 105 (0.2%) Captain Rizz (Rizz Party) 101 (0.2%)	Glenda Jackson
Harrow East	**Tony McNulty** **29,962 (52.52%)**	Hugh Dykes 20,189 (35.43%)	Baldev Sharma 4,697 (8.24%)	Bernard Casey 1,537 (2.70%)	A.J. Scholefield (UKIP) 464 (0.81%) Andrew Planton (NLP) 171 (0.30%)	Hugh Dykes
Harrow West	**Gareth Thomas** **21,811 (41.5%)**	Robert Hughes 20,571 (39.2%)	Pash Nandhra 8,127 (15.5%)	Herbert Crossman 1,997 (3.8%)		Robert Hughes
Hayes and Harlington	**John McDonnell** **25,458 (62.0%)**	Andrew Retter 11,167 (27.2%)	Tony Little 3,049 (7.4%)	Frederick Page 778 (1.9%)	John Hutchins (NF) 504 (1.2%) Daniel Farrow (All Night Party) 135 (0.3%)	Terry Dicks†
Hendon	**Andrew Dismore** **24,683 (49.3%)**	John Gorst 18,528 (37.0%)	Wayne Casey 5,427 (10.8%)	Stanley Rabbow 978 (2.0%)	B.P. Wright (UKIP) 267 (0.5%) Stella Taylor (WRP) 153 (0.3%)	John Gorst‡ (Hendon North)
Holborn and St Pancras	**Frank Dobson** **24,707 (65.0%)**	Julian L. Smith 6,804 (17.9%)	Justine McGuiness 4,758 (12.5%)	Julia T.G. Carr 790 (2.1%)	Timothy P.J. Bedding (NLP) 191 (0.5%) Stephen Smith (Ind.) 173 (0.5%) Brigid Conway (WRP) 171 (0.4%) Martin Rosenthal (RDT) 157 (0.4%) Peter Rice-Evans (Ind.) 140 (0.4%) Bruno F. Quintavalle (PLA) 114 (0.3%)	Frank Dobson
Kensington and Chelsea	Robert Atkinson 10,368 (27.9%)	**Alan Clark** **19,887 (53.6%)**	Robert Woodthorpe Browne 5,668 (15.3%)		Andrew Ellis-Jones (UKIP) 540 (1.5%) Edward Bear (TBA) 218 (0.6%) Paul Oliver (UKPP) 176 (0.5%) Susan J. Hamza (NLP) 122 (0.3%) Paul Sullivan (RDT) 65 (0.2%) Pete Parliament (Ind.) 44 (0.1%)	Dudley Fishburn† (Kensington)
Regent's Park and Kensington North	**Karen Buck** **28,367 (59.9%)**	Paul McGuinness 13,710 (29.0%)	Emily Gasson 4,041 (8.5%)	Sandra Dangoor 867 (1.8%)	Jonathan Hinde (NLP) 192 (0.4%) Debbie Sadowitz (RDT) 167 (0.4%)	John Wheeler† (Westminster North)
Ruislip-Northwood	Paul D. Barker 14,732 (32.9%)	**John Wilkinson** **22,526 (50.2%)**	Chris D.J. Edwards 7,279 (16.2%)		Cherry E. Griffin (NLP) 296 (0.8%)	John Wilkinson
Uxbridge	David Williams 17,371 (41.8%)	**Michael Shersby** **18,095 (43.5%)**	Andrew Malyan 4,528 (10.9%)	Garrick Aird 1,153 (2.8%)	Julia Leonard (SP) 398 (1.0%)	Michael Shersby

==== South East London ====
South East London elected 16 Members of Parliament across the boroughs of Lambeth, Southwark, Lewisham, Bromley, Greenwich and Bexley.

Constituency	Candidates					Incumbent
Constituency	Labour	Conservative	Liberal Democrat	Referendum	Other	Incumbent
Beckenham	Robert Nigel Hughes 18,131 (33.36%)	**Piers Merchant** **23,084 (42.47%)**	Rosemary Elizabeth Vetterlein 9,858 (18.14%)	Leonard Francis Mead 1,663 (3.06%)	Phil Hocknell Rimmer (Liberal) 720 (1.32%) Christopher Norman Pratt (UKIP) 506 (0.93%) John Charles McAuley (NF) 388 (0.71%)	Piers Merchant
Bexleyheath and Crayford	**Nigel Beard** **21,942 (45.5%)**	David Evennett 18,527 (38.4%)	Francoise J. Montford 5,391 (11.2%)	Barrie R. Thomas 1,551 (3.2%)	Pauline Smith (BNP) 429 (0.9%) W. Jenner (UKIP) 383 (0.8%)	David Evennett (Erith and Crayford)
Bromley and Chislehurst	Rob Yeldham 13,310 (25.2%)	**Eric Forth** **24,428 (46.3%)**	Paul Booth 12,530 (23.8%)		Rob Bryant (UKIP) 1,176 (2.2%) Frances Speed (Green) 1,176 (1.2%) Michael Stoneman (NF) 369 (0.7%) Gabriel Aitman (Liberal) 285 (0.5%)	Roger Sims† (Chislehurst); John Hunt† (Ravensbourne)
Camberwell and Peckham	Harriet Harman **19,734 (69.5%)**	Kim Humphreys 3,283 (11.6%)	Nigel P. Williams 3,198 (11.2%)	Nicholas A. China 692 (2.4%)	Angela M. Ruddock (SLP) 685 (2.4%) Gerry A. Williams (Liberal) 443 (1.6%) Joan Barker (SP) 233 (0.8%) Christopher Eames (WRP) 106 (0.4%)	Harriet Harman‡ (Peckham)
Dulwich and West Norwood	**Tessa Jowell** **27,807 (61.0%)**	Roger Gough 11,038 (24.2%)	Susan Kramer 4,916 (10.8%)	Bruce Coles 897 (2.0%)	Alex Goldie (Liberal) 587 (1.3%) David Goodman (RDT) 173 (0.4%) Eddie Pike (UKIP) 159 (0.3%) Captain Rizz (Rizz Party) 38 (0.1%)	Tessa Jowell‡ (Dulwich)
Eltham	**Clive Efford** **23,710 (54.6%)**	Clive D. Blackwood 13,528 (31.2%)	Amanda J. Taylor 3,701 (8.5%)	Matthew D. Clark 1,414 (3.3%)	Henry Middleton (Liberal) 584 (1.3%) William A. Hitches (BNP) 491 (1.1%)	Peter Bottomley‡
Erith and Thamesmead	**John Austin** **25,812 (62.1%)**	Nadhim Zahawi 8,388 (20.2%)	Alex H.C. Grigg 5,001 (12.0%)	John E. Flunder 1,394 (3.4%)	Victor J. Dooley (BNP) 718 (1.7%) M.L. Jackson (UKIP) 274 (0.7%)	John Austin‡ (Woolwich)
Greenwich and Woolwich	**Nick Raynsford** **25,630 (63,4%)**	Michael Mitchell 7,502 (18.6%)	Cherry Luxton 5,049 (12.5%)	Douglas Ellison 1,670 (4.1%)	Ronald Mallone (FP) 428 (1.1%) David Martin-Eagle (Constit.) 124 (0.3%)	Nick Raynsford‡ (Greenwich)
Lewisham Deptford	**Joan Ruddock** **23,827 (70.8%)**	Irene Kimm 4,949 (14.7%)	Kofi Appiah 3,004 (8.9%)	Shelagh Shepherd 868 (2.5%)	John Mulrenan (SLP) 996 (2.9%)	Joan Ruddock
Lewisham East	**Bridget Prentice** **21,821 (58.3%)**	Philip Hollobone 9,694 (25.9%)	David Buxton 4,178 (11.2%)	Spencer Drury 910 (2.4%)	Robert Croucher (NF) 431 (1.2%) Peter White (Liberal) 277 (0.7%) K. Rizz (Ind.) 97 (0.26%)	Bridget Prentice
Lewisham West	**Jim Dowd** **23,273 (62.0%)**	Clare Whelan 8,956 (23.8%)	Kathy McGrath 3,672 (9.8%)	Anthony Leese 1,098 (2.9%)	Nick Long (SLP) 298 (1.1%) Elizabeth Oram (Liberal) 167 (0.5%)	Jim Dowd
North Southwark and Bermondsey	Jeremy Fraser 16,444 (40.3%)	Grant Shapps 2,835 (6.9%)	**Simon Hughes** **19,831 (48.6%)**	Bill Newton 545 (1.3%)	Michael Davidson (BNP) 713 (1.7%) Ian Grant (CL) 175 (0.4%) James Munday (Liberal) 157 (0.4%) Ingga Yngvisson (ND) 95 (0.2%)	Simon Hughes‡ (Southwark and Bermondsey)
Old Bexley and Sidcup	Richard Justham 18,039 (35.1%)	**Edward Heath** **21,608 (42.1%)**	Iain King 8,284 (16.1%)	Brian Reading 2,457 (4.8%)	C. Bullen (UKIP) 489 (1.0%) Valerie Tyndall (BNP) 415 (0.8%) Robert Stephens (NLP) 99 (0.2%)	Edward Heath
Orpington	Sue Polydorou 10,753 (17.9%)	**John Horam** **24,417 (40.6%)**	Chris Maines 21,465 (35.7%)	David Clark 2,316 (3.8%)	James Carver (UKIP) 489 (0.9%) Robin Almond (Liberal) 494 (0.8%) Nicholas Wilton (PLA) 191 (0.3%)	John Horam
Streatham	**Keith Hill** **28,181 (62.8%)**	Ernest Noad 9,758 (21.7%)	Roger O'Brien 6,082 (13.6%)	Jeremy J. Wall 864 (1.9%)		Keith Hill
Vauxhall	**Kate Hoey** **24,920 (63.8%)**	Richard Bacon 5,952 (15.2%)	Keith Kerr 6,260 (16.0%)		Ian Driver (SLP) 983 (2.5%) Shane Collins (Green) 862 (0.8%) Richard Headicar (SGB) 97 (0.3%)	Kate Hoey

==== South West London ====
South West London elected 15 Members of Parliament across the boroughs of Hounslow, Richmond upon Thames, Kingston upon Thames, Wandsworth, Merton, Sutton and Croydon.

Constituency	Candidates					Incumbent
Constituency	Labour	Conservative	Liberal Democrat	Referendum	Other	Incumbent
Battersea	**Martin Linton** **24,047 (50.7%)**	John Bowis 18,687 (39.4%)	Paula Keaveney 3,482 (7.4%)	Mark Slater 804 (1.7%)	Ashley Banks (UKIP) 250 (0.5%) Joseph Marshall (RDT) 127 (0.3%)	John Bowis
Brentford and Isleworth	**Ann Keen** **32,249 (57.4%)**	Nirj Deva 17,825 (31.8%)	Gareth Hartwell 4,613 (8.2%)	John W. Bradley 687 (1.2%)	B. Simmerson (UKIP) 614 (1.1%) Morris Ahmed (NLP) 147 (0.3%)	Nirj Deva
Carshalton and Wallington	Andrew Theobald 11,565 (23.9%)	Nigel Forman 16,223 (33.5%)	**Tom Brake** **18,490 (38.2%)**	Julian Storey 1,289 (2.7%)	Peter Hickson (Green) 377 (0.8%) Gary Ritchie (BNP) 261 (0.5%) Leslie Povey (UKIP) 218 (0.5%)	Nigel Forman
Croydon Central	**Geraint Davies** **25,432 (45.6%)**	David Congdon 21,535 (38.6%)	George W. Schlich 6,061 (10.9%)	Charles Cook 1,886 (3.4%)	Mario−Simon Barnsley (Green) 595 (1.1%) John Woollcott (UKIP) 290 (0.5%)	David Congdon (Croydon North East); Paul Beresford§‡ (Croydon Central)
Croydon North	**Malcolm Wicks** **32,672 (62.2%)**	Ian Martin 14,274 (27.2%)	Martin Morris 4,066 (7.7%)	Roger Billis 1,155 (2.2%)	James R. Feisenberger (UKIP) 396 (0.8%)	New constituency
Croydon South	Charlie Burling 13,719 (25.3%)	**Richard Ottaway** **25,649 (47.3%)**	Steven Gauge 11,441 (21.1%)	Tony Barber 2,631 (4.9%)	Paul Ferguson (BNP) 354 (0.7%) A.G. Harker (Ind.) 309 (0.6%) Mark Samuel (Ind.) 96 (0.2%)	Richard Ottaway
Feltham and Heston	**Alan Keen** **27,836 (59.7%)**	Patrick Ground 12,563 (26.9%)	Colin D. Penning 4,264 (9.1%)	Rupert A. Stubbs 1,099 (2.4%)	Robert Church (BNP) 682 (1.5%) David J. Fawcett (NLP) 177 (0.4%)	Alan Keen
Kingston and Surbiton	Sheila Griffin 12,811 (23.0%)	Richard Tracey 20,355 (36.6%)	**Ed Davey** **20,411 (36.7%)**	Gail Tchiprout 1,470 (2.6%)	Amy Burns (UKIP) 418 (0.8%) Mark Leighton (NLP) 100 (0.2%) Clifford Port (RDT) 100 (0.2%)	Norman Lamont§‡ (Kingston); Richard Tracey‡ (Surbiton)
Mitcham and Morden	**Siobhain McDonagh** **27,984 (58.4%)**	Angela Rumbold 14,243 (29.7%)	Nicholas Harris 3,632 (7.6%)	Peter J. Isaacs 810 (1.7%)	Linda Miller (BNP) 521 (1.1%) Thomas Walsh (Green) 415 (0.9%) Krishnapillai Vasan (Ind.) 144 (0.3%) John R. Barrett (UKIP) 117 (0.2%) Nigel T. V. Dixon (Oth.) (Note: Anti-Corruption) 80 (0.2%)	Angela Rumbold
Putney	**Tony Colman** **20,084 (45.6%)**	David Mellor 17,108 (38.9%)	Russell Pyne 4,739 (10.8%)	James Goldsmith 1,518 (3.5%)	William Jamieson (UKIP) 233 (0.5%) Lenny Beige (AKA Steve Furst) (Oth.) (Note: Happiness Stan's Freedom to Party) 101 (0.2%) Michael Yardley (Oth.) (Note: Sportsman's Alliance: Anything but Mellor) 90 (0.2%) John Small (NLP) 66 (0.2%) Ateeka Poole (Oth.) (Note: Independently Beautiful Party) 49 (0.1%) Dorian Van Braam (Oth.) (Note: Renaissance Democrat) 7 (0.02%)	David Mellor
Richmond Park	Sue Jenkins 7,172 (12.6%)	Jeremy Hanley 22,442 (39.5%)	**Jenny Tonge** **25,393 (44.7%)**	Jake Pugh 1,467 (2.6%)	David Beaupre (OMRLP) 348 (0.7%) Bruno D'Arcy (NLP) 102 (0.2%) Peter Davies (RDT) 73 (0.1%)	Jeremy Hanley‡ (Richmond and Barnes)
Sutton and Cheam	Mark Allison 7,280 (15.5%)	Olga Maitland 17,822 (37.85%)	**Paul Burstow** **19,919 (42.30%)**	Peter Atkinson 1,784 (3.8%)	Simon Mckie (UKIP) 191 (0.4%) Deborah Wright (NLP) 86 (0.2%)	Olga Maitland
Tooting	**Tom Cox** **27,516 (59.7%)**	James B.B. Hutchings 12,505 (27.1%)	Simon James 4,320 (9.4%)	Angela M. Husband 829 (1.8%)	John Rattray (Green) 527 (1.1%) Peter Boddington (Ind.) 161 (0.3%) Jan Koene (Ind.) 94 (0.2%) Daniel Bailey-Bond (RDT) 83 (0.1%) Peter Miller (NLP) 70 (0.2%)	Tom Cox
Twickenham	Eva Tutchell 9,065 (15.6%)	Toby Jessel 21,956 (37.8%)	**Vince Cable** **26,237 (45.1%)**		Jane Harrison (Oth.) (Note: Independent English Conservative and Referendum) 589 (1.0%) Terence D. Haggar (RDT) 155 (0.3%) Anthony J.W. Hardy (NLP) 142 (0.2%)	Toby Jessel
Wimbledon	**Roger Casale** **20,674 (42.8%)**	Charles Goodson-Wickes 17,684 (36.6%)	Alison L. Willott 8,014 (16.6%)	Abid Hameed 993 (2.1%)	Rajeev K. Thacker (Green) 474 (1.0%) Sophie A.H. Davies (PLA) 346 (0.7%) Matthew G. Kirby (Oth.) (Note: Mongolian Barbeque Great Place to Party) 112 (0.2%) Graham L. Stacey (RDT) 47 (0.1%)	Charles Goodson-Wickes

=== North East England ===
North East England elected 30 Members of Parliament across the 4 counties of England's least populated region; Cleveland, County Durham, Northumberland and Tyne and Wear.

==== Cleveland ====
Cleveland elected 6 Members of Parliament in 6 seats – 5 borough constituencies and 1 county constituency.

Constituency	Candidates				Incumbent
Constituency	Labour	Conservative	Liberal Democrat	Referendum	Incumbent
Hartlepool	**Peter Mandelson** **26,997 (60.7%)**	Michael Horsley 9,489 (21.3%)	Reginald Clark 6,248 (14.1%)	Maureen Henderson 1,718 (3.9%)	Peter Mandelson
Middlesbrough	**Stuart Bell** **32,925 (71.4%)**	Liam Benham 7,907 (17.2%)	Alison Charlesworth 3,934 (8.5%)	Robert Edwards 1,331 (2.9%)	Stuart Bell
Middlesbrough South and East Cleveland	**Ashok Kumar** **29,319 (54.7%)**	Michael Bates 18,712 (34.9%)	Hamish Garrett 4,004 (7.5%)	Robin Batchelor 1,552 (2.9%)	Michael Bates‡ (Langbaurgh)
Redcar	**Mo Mowlam** **32,972 (67.3%)**	Andrew Isaacs 11,308 (23.1%)	Joyce Benbow 4,679 (9.6%)		Mo Mowlam
Stockton North	**Frank Cook** **29,726 (66.8%)**	Bryan Johnston 8,369 (18.8%)	Suzanne Fletcher 4,816 (10.8%)	Kevin McConnell 1,563 (3.5%)	Frank Cook
Stockton South	**Dari Taylor** **28,790 (56.3%)**	Tim Devlin 17,205 (33.7%)	Peter Monck 4,721 (9.2%)	John Horner 400 (0.8%)	Tim Devlin

==== County Durham ====
County Durham elected 7 Members of Parliament in 7 seats – 1 borough constituency and 6 county constituencies.

Constituency	Candidates					Incumbent
Constituency	Labour	Conservative	Liberal Democrat	Referendum	Other	Incumbent
Bishop Auckland	**Derek Foster** **30,359 (65.9%)**	Josephine H. Fergus 9,295 (20.2%)	Les Ashworth 4,293 (9.3%)	David S.W. Blacker 2,104 (4.6%)		Derek Foster
City of Durham	**Gerry Steinberg** **31,102 (63.3%)**	Richard Chalk 8,598 (17.5%)	Nigel Martin 7,499 (15.3%)	Margaret Robson 1,723 (3.6%)	Paul Kember (NLP) 213 (0.4%)	Gerry Steinberg
Darlington	**Alan Milburn** **29,658 (61.7%)**	Peter Scrope 13,633 (28.3%)	Leslie Boxell 3,483 (7.2%)	Michael Blakey 1,399 (2.9%)		Alan Milburn
Easington	**John Cummings** **33,600 (80.2%)**	Jason D. Hollands 3,588 (8.6%)	Jim P. Heppell 3,025 (7.2%)	Richard B. Pulfrey 1,179 (2.8%)	Steve P. Colborn (SGB) 503 (1.2%)	John Cummings
North Durham	**Giles Radice** **33,142 (70.3%)**	Mark T. Hardy 6,843 (14.5%)	Brian D. Moore 5,225 (11.1%)	Ian A.C. Parkin 1,958 (4.2%)		Giles Radice
North West Durham	**Hilary Armstrong** **31,855 (68.8%)**	Louise St John-Howe 7,101 (15.3%)	Anthony Gillings 4,991 (10.8%)	Rodney Atkinson 2,372 (5.1%)		Hilary Armstrong
Sedgefield	**Tony Blair** **33,526 (71.2%)**	Elizabeth Pitman 8,383 (17.8%)	Ronald Beadle 3,050 (6.5%)	Miriam Hall 1,683 (3.6%)	Brian Gibson (SLP) 474 (1.0%)	Tony Blair

==== Northumberland ====
Northumberland elected 4 Members of Parliament in 4 seats – 1 borough constituency and 3 county constituencies.

Constituency	Candidates					Incumbent
Constituency	Labour	Conservative	Liberal Democrat	Referendum	Other	Incumbent
Berwick-upon-Tweed	Paul Brannen 10,965 (26.2%)	Nick Herbert 10,058 (24.1%)	**Alan Beith** **19,007 (45.5%)**	Ned Lambton 1,423 (3.4%)	Ian Dodds (UKIP) 352 (0.8%)	Alan Beith
Blyth Valley	**Ronnie Campbell** **27,276 (64.2%)**	Barbara Musgrave 5,666 (13.3%)	Andrew Lamb 9,540 (22.5%)			Ronnie Campbell
Hexham	Ian McMinn 17,479 (38.2%)	**Peter Atkinson** **17,701 (38.8%)**	Philip Carr 7,959 (17.4%)	Robert Waddell 1,362 (3.0%)	David Lott (UKIP) 1,170 (2.6%)	Peter Atkinson
Wansbeck	**Denis Murphy** **29,569 (65.5%)**	Paul V. Green 6,299 (13.9%)	Alan Thompson 7,202 (15.9)	Peter H. Gompertz 1,146 (2.5%)	Nic Best (Green) 956 (2.1%)	Jack Thompson†

==== Tyne and Wear ====
Tyne and Wear elected 13 Members of Parliament in 13 seats – 13 borough constituencies.

===== Newcastle and Tyneside =====
Newcastle and North Tyneside and South Tyneside elected 7 Members of Parliament.

Constituency	Candidates					Incumbent
Constituency	Labour	Conservative	Liberal Democrat	Referendum	Other	Incumbent
Jarrow	**Stephen Hepburn** **28,497 (64.9%)**	Mark C. Allatt 6,564 (14.9)	Tim N. Stone 4,865 (11.1)	Peter W. Mailer 1,034 (2.4%)	Alan J. Le Blond (Ind. Lab.) 2,538 (5.8%) John Bissett (SGB) 444 (1.0%)	Don Dixon†
Newcastle upon Tyne Central	**Jim Cousins** **27,272 (59.2%)**	Brooks Newmark 10,792 (23.4%)	Ruth Berry 6,911 (15.0%)	Charles A. Coxon 1,113 (2.4%)		Jim Cousins
Newcastle upon Tyne East and Wallsend	**Nick Brown** **29,607 (71.19%)**	Jeremy Middleton 5,796 (13.94%)	Graham Morgan 4,415 (10.62%)	Peter Cossins 966 (2.32%)	Blanch Carpenter (SLP) 642 (1.54%) Martin Levy (Comm.) 163 (0.39%)	Nick Brown‡ (Newcastle upon Tyne East); Stephen Byers‡ (Wallsend)
Newcastle upon Tyne North	**Doug Henderson** **28,125 (62.2%)**	Gregory B. White 8,793 (19.4%)	Peter J. Allen 6,578 (14.5%)	Doreen Chipchase, 1,733 (3.8%)		Doug Henderson
North Tyneside	**Stephen Byers** **32,810 (72.8%)**	Michael McIntyre 6,167 (13.7%)	Tommy Mulvenna 4,762 (10.6%)	Michael Rollings 1,382 (3.1%)		Stephen Byers‡ (Wallsend)
South Shields	**David Clark** **27,834 (71.4%)**	Mark Hoban 5,681 (14.6%)	David Ord 3,429 (8.8%)	Alan Lorriane 1,660 (4.3%)	Ian Wilburn (Ind.) 374 (1.0%)	David Clark
Tynemouth	**Alan Campbell** **28,318 (55.4%)**	Martin Callanan 17,045 (33.3%)	Andrew Duffield 4,509 (8.8%)	Clive Rook 819 (1.6%)	Frank Rogers (UKIP) 462 (0.9%)	Neville Trotter†

===== Gateshead and Sunderland =====
Gateshead and Sunderland elected 6 Members of Parliament.

Constituency	Candidates					Incumbent
Constituency	Labour	Conservative	Liberal Democrat	Referendum	Other	Incumbent
Blaydon	**John McWilliam** **27,535 (60.0%)**	Mark A. Watson 6,048 (13.2%)	Peter J. Maughan 10,930 (23.8%)		Richard J. Rook (Ind.) 1,412 (3.1%)	John McWilliam
Gateshead East and Washington West	**Joyce Quin** **31,047 (72.1%)**	Jacqui M. Burns 6,097 (14.2%)	Alan D. Ord 4,622 (10.7%)	Michael Daley 1,315 (3.1%)		Joyce Quin‡ (Gateshead East)
Houghton and Washington East	**Fraser Kemp** **31,946 (76.38%)**	Philip Booth 5,391 (12.89%)	Keith Miller 3,209 (7.67%)	James Joseph 1,277 (3.05%)		Roland Boyes†
Tyne Bridge	**David Clelland** **26,767 (76.8%)**	Adrian H. Lee 3,861 (11.1%)	Mary Wallace 2,785 (8.0%)	Graeme R. Oswald 919 (2.6%)	Elaine Brumskill (SP) 518 (1.5%)	David Clelland
Sunderland North	**Bill Etherington** **26,067 (68.2%)**	Andrew Selous 6,370 (16.7%)	Geoffrey Pryke 3,973 (10.4%)	Mark Nicholson 1,394 (3.6%)	Kenneth Newby (OMRLP) 409 (1.1%)	Bill Etherington
Sunderland South	**Chris Mullin** **27,174 (68.1%)**	Timothy Schofield 7,536 (18.9%)	John Lennox 4,606 (11.5%)		Margaret Wilkinson (UKIP) 609 (1.5%)	Chris Mullin

=== North West England ===
North West England elected 76 Members of Parliament across 5 counties; Cheshire, Cumbria, Greater Manchester, Lancashire and Merseyside.

==== Cheshire ====
Cheshire elected 11 Members of Parliament in 11 seats – 2 borough constituencies and 9 county constituencies.

Constituency	Candidates					Incumbent
Constituency	Labour	Conservative	Liberal Democrat	Referendum	Other	Incumbent
City of Chester	**Christine Russell** **29,806 (53.0%)**	Gyles Brandreth 19,253 (34.2%)	David Simpson 5,353 (9.5%)	Richard Mullen 1,487 (2.6%)	Ian Sanderson (OMRLP) 204 (0.4%) William Johnson (Oth.) (Note: West Cheshire College In Crisis) 154 (0.3%)	Gyles Brandreth
Congleton	Helen Scholey 14,713 (27.6%)	**Ann Winterton** **22,012 (41.2%)**	Joan Walmsley 15,882 (29.7%)		John Lockett (UKIP) 811 (1.5%)	Ann Winterton
Crewe and Nantwich	**Gwyneth Dunwoody** **29,460 (58.2%)**	Michael Loveridge 13,662 (27.0%)	David Cannon 5,940 (11.7%)	Peter Astbury 1,543 (3.0%)		Gwyneth Dunwoody
Eddisbury	Margaret R. Hanson 19,842 (40.1%)	**Alastair Goodlad** **21,027 (42.5%)**	David Reaper 6,540 (13.2%)	Norine D. Napier 2,041 (4.2%)		Alastair Goodlad
Ellesmere Port and Neston	**Andrew Miller** **31,310 (59.6%)**	Lynn Turnbull 15,274 (29.1%)	Joanna Pemberton 4,673 (8.9%)	Colin S. Rodden 1,305 (2.5%)		Andrew Miller
Halton	**Derek Twigg** **31,497 (70.9%)**	Philip Balmer 7,847 (17.7%)	Janet Jones 3,263 (7.3%)	Reginald Atkins 1,036 (2.3%)	David Proffitt (Liberal) 600 (1.4%) John Alley (Republican) 196 (0.4%)	Gordon Oakes†
Macclesfield	Janet A. Jackson 18,234 (33.6%)	**Nicholas Winterton** **26,888 (49.6%)**	Michael Flynn 9,075 (16.7%)			Nicholas Winterton
Tatton		Neil Hamilton 18,277 (37.5%)			**Martin Bell (Independent)** **29,354 (60.2%)** Sam Hill (Ind. Con.) 295 (0.6%) Simon Kinsey (Ind. Con.) 184 (0.4%) Burnel Penhaul (Oth.) (Note: Miss Moneypenny's Glamorous One Party) 128 (0.3%) John Muir (Oth.) (Note: Albion Party) 126 (0.3%) Michael Kennedy (NLP) 123 (0.3%) David Bishop (Oth.) (Note: Lord Biro versus the Scallywag Tories) 116 (0.2%) Ralph Nicholas (Ind. Con.) 113 (0.2%) Julian Price (Oth.) (Note: Juice Party) 73 (0.1%)	Neil Hamilton
Warrington North	**Helen Jones** **31,827 (62.1%)**	Ray Lacey 12,300 (24.0%)	Ian Greenhalgh 5,308 (10.4%)	Arthur Smith 1,816 (3.5%)		Doug Hoyle†
Warrington South	**Helen Southworth** **28,721 (52.1%)**	Chris Grayling 17,914 (32.5%)	Peter Walker 7,199 (13.1%)	Gerald Kelly 1,082 (2.0%)	Steve Ross (NLP) 166 (0.3%)	Mike Hall‡
Weaver Vale	**Mike Hall** **27,244 (56.4%)**	James Byrne 13,796 (28.6%)	Trevor Griffiths 5,949 (12.3%)	Roger Cockfield 1,312 (2.7%)		Mike Hall‡ (Warrington South)

==== Cumbria ====
Cumbria elected 6 Members of Parliament in 1 borough constituency and 5 county constituencies.

Constituency	Candidates					Incumbent
Constituency	Labour	Conservative	Liberal Democrat	Referendum	Other	Incumbent
Barrow and Furness	**John Hutton** **27,630 (57.3%)**	Richard Hunt 13,133 (27.2%)	Anne A. Metcalfe 4,264 (8.8%)	David Y. Mitchell 1,208 (2.5%)	Jim Hamezeian (Ind.) 1,995 (4.1%)	John Hutton
Carlisle	**Eric Martlew** **25,031 (57.4%)**	Richard T. Lawrence 12,641 (29.0%)	Christopher A. Mayho 4,576 (10.5%)	Angus J. Fraser 1,233 (2.8%)	William A. Stevens (NLP) 126 (0.3%)	Eric Martlew
Copeland	**Jack Cunningham** **24,077 (58.2%)**	Andrew Cumpsty 12,081 (29.2%)	Roger C. Putnam 3,814 (9.2%)	Chris Johnston 1,036 (2.5%)	Gerard Hanratty (PLA) 389 (0.9%)	Jack Cunningham
Penrith and The Border	Margaret Meling 10,576 (21.6%)	**David Maclean** **23,300 (47.6%)**	Kenneth Walker 13,067 (26.7%)	Charles Pope 2,018 (4.1%)		David Maclean
Westmorland and Lonsdale	John Harding 10,452 (20.6%)	**Tim Collins** **21,463 (42.3%)**	Stanley Collins 16,942 (33.4%)	Michael H. Smith 1,924 (3.8%)		Michael Jopling†
Workington	**Dale Campbell-Savours** **31,717 (64.2%)**	Robert Blunden 12,061 (24.4%)	Philip Roberts 3,967 (8.0%)	George Donnan 1,412 (2.9%)	Chris Austin (Ind.) 217 (0.4%)	Dale Campbell-Savours

==== Greater Manchester ====
Greater Manchester elected 27 Members of Parliament.

===== City of Manchester =====
The City of Manchester and Sale elected 6 Members of Parliament in 6 borough constituencies.

Constituency	Candidates					Incumbent
Constituency	Labour	Conservative	Liberal Democrat	Referendum	Other	Incumbent
Altrincham and Sale West	Jane Baugh 20,843 (40.3%)	**Graham Brady** **22,348 (43.2%)**	Marc Ramsbottom 6,535 (12.6%)	Anthony Landes 1,348 (2.6%)	Jonathan Stephens (PLA) 313 (0.6%) Richard Mrozinski (UKIP) 270 (0.5%)	Fergus Montgomery† (Altrincham and Sale)
Manchester Blackley	**Graham Stringer** **25,042 (70.0%)**	Steve Barclay 5,454 (15.3%)	Simon D. Wheale 3,937 (11.0%)	Paul Stayner 1,323 (3.7%)		Doug Hoyle†
Manchester Central	**Tony Lloyd** **23,803 (71.0%)**	Simon McIlwaine 3,964 (11.8%)	Alison Firth 4,121 (12.3%)	John Maxwell 742 (2.2%)	Francis Rafferty (SLP) 810 (2.4%) Timothy Rigby (CL) 97 (0.3%)	Bob Litherland†
Manchester Gorton	**Gerald Kaufman** **23,704 (65.3%)**	Guy Senior 4,249 (11.7%)	Jackie Pearcey 6,362 (17.5%)	Kevin Hartley 812 (2.2%)	Spencer FitzGibbon (Green) 683 (1.9%) Trevor Wongsam (SLP) 501 (1.4%)	Gerald Kaufman
Manchester Withington	**Keith Bradley** **27,103 (61.5%)**	Jonathan M. Smith 8,522 (19.3%)	Yasmin Zalzala 6,000 (13.6%)	Mark B.B. Sheppard 1,079 (2.5%)	Simon P. Caldwell (PLA) 614 (1.4%) Julie White (SP) 376 (0.9%) Stephen Kingston (RDT) 181 (0.4%) Mark E.J. Gaskell (NLP) 152 (0.4%)	Keith Bradley
Wythenshawe and Sale East	**Paul Goggins** **26,448 (58.1%)**	Paul Fleming 11,429 (25.1%)	Vanessa M. Tucker 5,639 (12.4%)	Brian Stanyer 1,060 (2.3%)	Jim D. Flannery (SLP) 957 (2.1%)	Alf Morris† (Manchester Wythenshawe)

===== Eastern Greater Manchester =====
The four eastern districts of Oldham, Rochdale Stockport and Tameside elected 11 Members of Parliament.

Constituency	Candidates					Incumbent
Constituency	Labour	Conservative	Liberal Democrat	Referendum	Other	Incumbent
Ashton-under-Lyne	**Robert Sheldon** **31,919 (67.5%)**	Richard Mayson 8,954 (18.9%)	Tim Pickstone 4,603 (9.7%)	Lorraine Clapham 1,346 (2.8%)	Prince Cymbal (OMRLP) 458 (1.0%)	Robert Sheldon
Cheadle	Paul Diggett 8,253 (15.7%)	**Stephen Day** **22,944 (43.7%)**	Patsy Calton 19,755 (37.7%)	Paul Brook 1,511 (2.9%)		Stephen Day
Denton and Reddish	**Andrew Bennett** **30,137 (65.4%)**	Barbara Nutt 9,826 (21.3%)	Iain Donaldson 6,121 (13.3%)			Andrew Bennett
Hazel Grove	Jeffrey Lewis 5,882 (11.9%)	Brendan Murphy 15,069 (30.5%)	**Andrew Stunell** **26,883 (54.5%)**	John Stanyer 1,055 (2.1%)	Gordon Black (UKIP) 268 (0.5%) Douglas Firkin-Flood (Humanist) 183 (0.4%)	Tom Arnold†
Heywood and Middleton	**Jim Dobbin** **29,179 (57.7%)**	Sebastian Grigg 11,637 (23.0%)	David Clayton 7,908 (15.6%)	Christine West 1,076 (2.1%)	Philip Burke (Liberal) 750 (1.5%)	Jim Callaghan†
Oldham East and Saddleworth	**Phil Woolas** **22,546 (41.7%)**	John Hudson 10,666 (19.7%)	Chris Davies 19,157 (35.4%)	Douglas Findlay 1,116 (2.0%)	John Smith (SLP) 470 (0.9%) Ian Dalling (NLP) 146 (0.3%)	Chris Davies‡ (Littleborough and Saddleworth)
Oldham West and Royton	**Michael Meacher** **26,894 (58.8%)**	Jonathan Lord 10,693 (23.4%)	Howard Cohen 5,434 (11.9%)	Peter Etherden 1,157 (2.5%)	Gias Choudhury (SLP) 1,311 (2.9%) Sheila Dalling (NLP) 249 (0.5%)	Bryan Davies† (Oldham Central and Royton); Michael Meacher‡ (Oldham West and Royton)
Rochdale	**Lorna Fitzsimons** **23,758 (49.4%)**	Mervyn Turnberg 4,237 (8.8%)	Liz Lynne 19,213 (40.0%)		Gary Bergin (BNP) 653 (1.4%) Mohammed Salim (Oth.) (Note: Islam Zinda Baad Platform) 221 (0.5%)	Liz Lynne
Stalybridge and Hyde	**Tom Pendry** **23,758 (49.4%)**	Nick de Bois 10,557 (24.5%)	Martin Cross 5,169 (12.0%)	Robert J.D. Clapham 1,992 (4.6%)		Tom Pendry
Stockport	**Ann Coffey** **29,338 (62.9%)**	Stephen Fitzsimmons 10,426 (22.3%)	Sylvia Roberts 4,951 (10.6%)	William Morley-Scott 1,280 (2.7%)	Geoff Southern (SLP) 255 (0.5%) Colin Newitt (OMRLP) 213 (0.5%) Christopher Dronfield (Ind. Con.) 206 (0.4%)	Ann Coffey

===== Western Greater Manchester =====
The five western districts of Bolton, Bury, Salford, Trafford and Wigan elected 12 Members of Parliament.

Constituency	Candidates					Incumbent
Constituency	Labour	Conservative	Liberal Democrat	Referendum	Other	Incumbent
Bolton North East	**David Crausby** **27,621 (56.1%)**	Rob Wilson 14,952 (30.4%)	Edmund Critchley 4,862 (9.9%)	David Staniforth 1,096 (2.2%)	William Kelly (SLP) 676 (1.4%)	Peter Thurnham†
Bolton South East	**Brian Iddon** **29,856 (68.9%)**	Paul Carter 8,545 (19.7%)	Frank Harasiwka 3,805 (8.8%)	William Pickering 973 (2.3%)	Lewis Walch (NLP) 170 (0.4%)	David Young†
Bolton West	**Ruth Kelly** **24,342 (49.5%)**	Tom Sackville 17,270 (35.1%)	Barbara Ronson 5,309 (10.8%)	Glenda Frankl-Slater 865 (1.8%)	Doris Kelly (SLP) 1,374 (2.8%)	Tom Sackville
Bury North	**David Chaytor** **28,523 (51.8%)**	Alistair Burt 20,657 (37.7%)	Neville Kenyon 4,536 (8.2%)	Richard Hallewell 1,337 (2.4%)		Alistair Burt
Bury South	**Ivan Lewis** **28,658 (56.9%)**	David Sumberg 16,277 (32.3%)	Victor D'Albert 4,227 (8.4%)	Bryan Slater 1,216 (2.4%)		David Sumberg
Eccles	**Ian Stewart** **30,468 (66.7%)**	Greg Barker 8,552 (18.7%)	Bob Boyd 4,905 (10.7%)	John de Roeck 1,765 (3.9%)		Joan Lestor†
Leigh	**Lawrence Cunliffe** **31,652 (68.9%)**	Edward Young 7,156 (15.6%)	Peter Hough 5,163 (11.2%)	Roy Constable 1,949 (4.2%)		Lawrence Cunliffe
Makerfield	**Ian McCartney** **33,119 (73.3%)**	Michael Winstanley 6,942 (15.4%)	Bruce Hubbard 3,743 (8.3%)	Andrew Seed 1,210 (2.7%)		Ian McCartney
Salford	**Hazel Blears** **22,848 (69.0%)**	Elliot Bishop 5,779 (17.5%)	Norman J. Owen 3,407 (10.3%)	Robert W. Cumpsty 926 (2.8%)	Susan Herman (NLP) 162 (0.5%)	Stan Orme† (Salford East)
Stretford and Urmston	**Beverley Hughes** **28,480 (58.5%)**	John Gregory 14,840 (30.5%)	John R. Bridges 3,978 (8.2%)	Caroline Dore 1,397 (2.9%)		Winston Spencer Churchill† (Davyhulme); Tony Lloyd‡ (Stretford)
Wigan	**Roger Stott** **30,043 (68.6%)**	Mark A. Loveday 7,400 (16.9%)	Trevor R. Beswick 4,390 (10.0%)	Anthony Bradborne 1,450 (3.3%)	Christopher Maile (Green) 442 (1.0%) William J. Ayliffe (NLP) 94 (0.2%)	Roger Stott
Worsley	**Terry Lewis** **29,083 (62.2%)**	Damien R.L. Garrido 11,342 (24.2%)	Robert Bleakley 6,356 (13.6%)			Terry Lewis

==== Lancashire ====
Lancashire elected 15 Members of Parliament.

Constituency	Candidates					Incumbent
Constituency	Labour	Conservative	Liberal Democrat	Referendum	Other	Incumbent
Blackburn	**Jack Straw** **26,141 (55.0%)**	Geeta Sidhu Robb 11,690 (24.6%)	Stephen Fenn 4,990 (10.5%)	David Bradshaw 1,892 (4.0%)	Tina Wingfield (ND) 671 (1.4%) Helen Drummond (SLP) 635 (1.3%) Robin Field (Green) 442 (1.3%) Margo Carmichael-Grimshaw (Oth.) (Note: Keep Britain Free and Independent Party) 506 (1.1%) John Batchelor (Oth.) (Note: Common Sense Sick of Politicians) 362 (0.8%)	Jack Straw
Blackpool North and Fleetwood	**Joan Humble** **28,051 (52.1%)**	Harold Elletson 19,105 (35.5%)	Beverley Hill 4,600 (8.6%)	Roy Hopwood 1,704 (3.2%)	Jon Ellis (BNP) 288 (0.5%)	Harold Elletson‡ (Blackpool North)
Blackpool South	**Gordon Marsden** **29,282 (57.0%)**	Richard Booth 17,666 (34.4%)	Doreen Holt 4,392 (8.6%)			Nick Hawkins‡
Burnley	**Peter Pike** **26,210 (57.9%)**	Bill Wiggin 9,148 (20.2%)	Gordon Birtwistle 7,877 (17.4%)	Richard Oakley 2,010 (4.4%)		Peter Pike
Chorley	**Lindsay Hoyle** **30,607 (53.0%)**	Den Dover 20,737 (35.9%)	Simon Jones 4,900 (8.5%)	Anthony Heaton 1,319 (2.3%)	Peter Leadbetter (NLP) 143 (0.2%)	Den Dover
Fylde	John Garrett 16,480 (31.7%)	**Michael Jack** **25,443 (48.9%)**	William L. Greene 7,609 (14.6%)	David J. Britton 2,372 (4.6%)	Terry B. Kerwin (NLP) 163 (0.3%)	Michael Jack
Hyndburn	**Greg Pope** **26,831 (55.6%)**	Peter Britcliffe 15,383 (31.9%)	Les Jones 4,141 (8.6%)	Philip Congdon 1,627 (2.4%)	James Brown (Oth.) (Note: Independent Anti-Corruption in Government (IAC)) 290 (0.4%)	Greg Pope
Lancaster and Wyre	**Hilton Dawson** **25,173 (42.8%)**	Keith Mans 23,878 (40.6%)	John C. Humberstone 6,802 (11.5%)	Vivien Ivell 1,516( 2.46)	Jon Barry (Green) 795 (1.3%) John Whittaker (UKIP) 698 (1.2%)	Elaine Kellett-Bowman† (Lancaster); Keith Mans‡ (Wyre)
Morecambe and Lunesdale	**Geraldine Smith** **24,061 (48.9%)**	Mark Lennox-Boyd 18,096 (36.7%)	June Greenwell 5,614 (11.4%)	Ian Ogilvie, 313 (2.47%)	David Walne (NLP) 165 (0.3%)	Mark Lennox-Boyd
Pendle	**Gordon Prentice** **25,059 (53.3%)**	John Midgley 14,235 (30.3%)	Tony Greaves 5,460 (11.6%)	Damian Hockney 2,281 (4.8%)		Gordon Prentice
Preston	**Audrey Wise** **29,220 (60.8%)**	Paul S. Gray 10,540 (21.9%)	William Chadwick 7,045 (14.7%)	John C. Porter 924 (1.9%)	John Ashforth (NLP) 345 (0.7%)	Audrey Wise
Ribble Valley	Marcus B. Johnstone 9,013 (15.7%)	**Nigel Evans** **26,702 (46.7%)**	Michael Carr 20,062 (35.1%)	Julian Parkinson 1,297 (2.3%)	Nicola Holmes (NLP) 147 (0.2%)	Nigel Evans
Rossendale and Darwen	**Janet Anderson** **27,470 (53.6%)**	Patricia Buzzard 16,521 (32.3%)	Brian Dunning 5,435 (10.6%)	Roy Newstead 1,108 (2.2%)	Andrew Wearden (BNP) 674 (1.3%)	Janet Anderson
South Ribble	**David Borrow** **25,856 (46.8%)**	Robert Atkins 20,772 (37.6%)	Tim Farron 5,879 (10.6%)	Mark Adams 1,475 (2.7%)	Nigel R. Ashton (Liberal) 1,127 (2.0%) Bibette Leadbetter (NLP) 122 (0.2%)	Robert Atkins
West Lancashire	**Colin Pickthall** **33,022 (60.3%)**	Chris J. Varley 15,903 (29.1%)	Arthur R. Wood 3,938 (7.2%)	Michael Carter 1,025 (1.9%)	John D. Collins (NLP) 449 (0.8%) David Hill (Ind.) 392 (0.7%)	Colin Pickthall

==== Merseyside ====
Merseyside elected 15 Members of Parliament.

===== City of Liverpool =====
The City of Liverpool elected 5 Members of Parliament in 5 borough constituencies.

Constituency	Candidates					Incumbent
Constituency	Labour	Conservative	Liberal Democrat	Referendum	Other	Incumbent
Liverpool, Garston	**Maria Eagle** **26,667 (61.3%)**	Nigel Gordon-Johnson 6,819 (15.7%)	Flo Clucas 8,250 (19.0%)	Frank Dunne 833 (1.9%)	Gary Copeland (Liberal) 666 (1.5%) John Parsons (NLP) 127 (0.3%) Stuart Nolan (SEP) 120 (0.3%)	Eddie Loyden†
Liverpool, Riverside	**Louise Ellman** **26,858 (70.4%)**	David G. Sparrow 3,635 (9.5%)	Beatrice L. Fraenkel 5,059 (13.3%)	George Skelly 586 (1.5%)	Cathy Wilson (SP) 776 (2.0%) David W. Green (Liberal) 594 (1.6%) Heather M. Neilson (PLA) 277 (0.7%) David Braid (Oth.) (Note: Multi-Racial Anti-Corruption Alliance) 179 (0.5%) Geoffrey Gay (NLP) 171 (0.5%)	Robert Parry†
Liverpool, Walton	**Peter Kilfoyle** **31,516 (78.4%)**	Mark K. Kotecha 2,551 (6.3%)	Richard J. Roberts 4,478 (11.1%)	Charles Grundy 620 (1.5%)	Lesley Mahmood (SP) 444 (1.1%) Hazel L. Williams (Liberal) 352 (0.9%) Veronica P. Mearns (PLA) 246 (0.6%)	Peter Kilfoyle
Liverpool, Wavertree	**Jane Kennedy** **29,592 (64.4%)**	Kit Malthouse 4,944 (10.8%)	Richard Kemp 9,891 (21.5%)	Peter A. Worthington 576 (1.3%)	Keith McCullough (Liberal) 391 (0.9%) Racheal A. Kingsley (PLA) 346 (0.8%) Carole Corkhill (WRP) 178 (0.4%)	Jane Kennedy‡ (Liverpool Broadgreen); David Alton† (Liverpool Mossley Hill)
Liverpool, West Derby	**Robert Wareing** **30,002 (71.2%)**	Neil C. Morgan 3,656 (8.7%)	Ann Hines 3,805 (9.0%)	Peter R. Forrest 657 (1.6%)	Steve Radford (Liberal) 4,037 (9.6%)	Robert Wareing

===== Knowsley, Sefton and St Helens =====
The three districts east of the City of Liverpool; Knowsley, Sefton and St Helens.

Constituency	Candidates					Incumbent
Constituency	Labour	Conservative	Liberal Democrat	Referendum	Other	Incumbent
Bootle	**Joe Benton** **31,668 (82.9%)**	Rupert Matthews 3,247 (8.5%)	Kiron Reid 2,191 (5.7%)	James Elliot 571 (1.5%)	Peter Glover (SLP) 420 (1.1%) Simon Cohen (NLP) 126 (0.3%)	Joe Benton
Crosby	**Clare Curtis-Tansley** **22,549 (51.1%)**	Malcolm Thornton 15,367 (34.8%)	Paul McVey 5,080 (11.5%)	John Gauld 813 (1.8%)	John Marks (Liberal) 233 (0.5%) William Hite (NLP) 99 (0.2%)	Malcolm Thornton
Knowsley North and Sefton East	**George Howarth** **34,747 (69.9%)**	Carl Doran 8,600 (17.3%)	David Bamber 5,499 (11.1%)		Chris Jones (SLP) 857 (1.7%)	George Howarth‡ (Knowsley North)
Knowsley South	**Eddie O'Hara** **36,695 (77.1%)**	Gary R. Robertson 5,987 (12.6%)	Clifford A. Mainey 3,954 (8.3%)	Andrew Wright 954 (2.0%)		Eddie O'Hara
St Helens North	**David Watts** **31,953 (64.9%)**	Pelham J.C. Walker 8,536 (17.3%)	John L. Beirne 6,270 (12.7%)	David Johnson 1,276 (2.6%)	Ron Waugh (SLP) 833 (1.7%) Richard D. Rubin (UKIP) 363 (0.7%)	John Evans†
St Helens South	**Gerry Bermingham** **30,367 (68.6%)**	Mary Russell 6,628 (15.0%)	Brian Spencer 5,919 (13.4%)	William Holdaway 1,165 (2.6%)	Harriet Jump (NLP) 179 (0.4%)	Gerry Bermingham
Southport	Sarah Norman 6,129 (12.1%)	Matthew Banks 18,186 (35.9%)	**Ronnie Fearn** **24,356 (48.1%)**	Frank Buckle 1,368 (2.67%)	Susan Ashton (Liberal) 386 (0.8%) Elizabeth Lines (NLP) 93 (0.2%) Michael Middleton (ND) 92 (0.2%)	Matthew Banks

===== Wirral =====
The district of Wirral elected 4 Members of Parliament in 2 borough constituencies and 2 county constituencies.

Constituency	Candidates					Incumbent
Constituency	Labour	Conservative	Liberal Democrat	Referendum	Other	Incumbent
Birkenhead	**Frank Field** **27,825 (70.8%)**	John Crosby 5,982 (15.2%)	Roy Wood 3,548 (9.0%)	Richard Evans 800 (2.0%)	Mark Cullen (SLP) 1,168 (3.0%)	Frank Field
Wallasey	**Angela Eagle** **30,264 (64.6%)**	Madelaine Wilcock 11,190 (23.9%)	Peter Reisdorf 3,899 (8.3%)	Roger Hayes 1,490 (3.2%)		Angela Eagle
Wirral South	**Ben Chapman** **24,499 (50.9%)**	Les Byrom 17,495 (36.4%)	Philip Gilchrist 5,018 (10.4%)	Donald Wilcox 768 (1.6%)	Jane Nielsen (PLP) 233 (0.5%) Geoffrey Mead (NLP) 51 (0.1%)	Ben Chapman
Wirral West	**Stephen Hesford** **21,035 (44.9%)**	David Hunt 18,297 (39.0%)	John Thornton 5,945 (12.7%)	Derek Wharton 1,613 (3.4%)		David Hunt

=== South East England ===
South East England, the most populous region, elected 83 Members of Parliament across 9 counties; Berkshire, Buckinghamshire, East and West Sussex, Hampshire, Isle of Wight, Kent, Oxfordshire and Surrey.

==== Berkshire ====
Berkshire elected 8 Members of Parliament in 8 seats – 2 borough constituencies and 6 county constituencies.

Constituency	Candidates					Incumbent
Constituency	Labour	Conservative	Liberal Democrat	Referendum	Other	Incumbent
Bracknell	Anne Snelgrove 17,596 (29.8%)	**Andrew MacKay** **27,983 (47.4%)**	Alan Hilliar 9,122 (15.4%)	Warwick Cairns 1,636 (2.8%)	John Tompkins (Ind.) 1,909 (3.2%) Lawrence Boxall (UKIP) 569 (1.0%) Dominica Roberts (PLA) 276 (0.2%)	Andrew MacKay‡ (East Berkshire)
Maidenhead	Denise Robson 9,205 (18.1%)	**Theresa May** **25,344 (49.8%)**	Andrew Ketteringham 13,363 (26.3%)	Charles Taverner 1,638 (3.2%)	David Munkley (Liberal) 896 (1.8%) Neil Spiers (UKIP) 277 (0.5%) Kristian Ardley (GBP) 166 (0.3%)	New constituency
Newbury	Paul Hannon 3,107 (5.5%)	Richard Benyon 21,370 (37.8%)	**David Rendel** **29,887 (52.9%)**	Ted Snook 992 (1.8%)	Rachel Stark (Green) 896 (1.8%) R Tubb (UKIP) 302 (0.5%) Katrina Howse (SLP) 174 (0.3%)	David Rendel
Reading East	**Jane Griffiths** **21,461 (42.7%)**	John Watts 17,666 (35.2%)	Sam Samuel 9,307 (18.5%)	David Harmer 1,042 (2.1%)	John Buckley (NLP) 254 (0.5%) A. L. Thornton (UKIP) 252 (0.5%) Barbara Packer (BNP) 238 (0.5%)	Gerard Vaughan†
Reading West	**Martin Salter** **21,841 (45.1%)**	Nicholas Bennett 18,844 (38.9%)	Dee Tomlin 6,153 (12.7%)	Steven G. Brown 976 (2.0%)	Ian Dell (BNP) 320 (0.7%) David M. Black (UKIP) 255 (0.5%)	Tony Durant†
Slough	**Fiona Mactaggart** **27,029 (56.6%)**	Peta Buscombe 13,958 (29.2%)	Chris Bushill 3,509 (7.4%)	Terence J. Sharkey 1,124 (2.4%)	Anne Bradshaw (Liberal) 1,835 (3.8%) Paul P. Whitmore (Ind.) 277 (0.6%)	John Watts†
Windsor	Amanda Williams 9,287 (18.3%)	**Michael Trend** **24,476 (48.2%)**	Chris Fox 14,559 (28.7%)	James McDermott 1,676 (3.3%)	Paul Bradshaw (Liberal) 388 (0.8%) E. Bigg (UKIP) 302 (0.6%) Ronald Parr (Dynamic) 93 (0.2%)	Michael Trend‡ (Windsor and Maidenhead)
Wokingham	Patricia Colling 8,424 (16.8%)	**John Redwood** **25,086 (50.1%)**	Royce Longton 15,721 (31.4%)		Peter Owen(OMRLP) 877 (1.8%)	John Redwood

==== Buckinghamshire ====
Buckinghamshire elected 7 Members of Parliament in 7 seats – 1 borough and 6 county constituencies.

Constituency	Candidates					Incumbent
Constituency	Labour	Conservative	Liberal Democrat	Referendum	Other	Incumbent
Aylesbury	Robert Langridge 12,759 (22.2%)	**David Lidington** **25,426 (44.2%)**	Sharon Bowles 17,007 (29.5%)	Marc John 2,196 (3.8%)	Lawrence R. Sheaff (NLP) 166 (0.3%)	David Lidington
Beaconsfield	Alastair Hudson 10,063 (20.0%)	**Dominic Grieve** **24,709 (49.2%)**	Peter Mapp 10,722 (21.4%)	Humphrey Lloyd 2,197 (4.4%)	Charlie Lawman (Ind. Con.) 1,434 (2.9%) Christopher Cooke (UKIP) 451 (0.9%) Gillian Duval (PLA) 286 (0.6%) Tom Dyball (NLP) 193 (0.4%) Robert Matthews (Ind.) 146 (0.3%)	Tim Smith†
Buckingham	Robert C. Lehmann 12,208 (24.7%)	**John Bercow** **24,594 (49.8%)**	Neil Stuart 12,175 (24.6%)		Geoffrey Clements (NLP) 421 (0.9%)	George Walden†
Chesham and Amersham	Paul Farrelly 10,240 (19.6%)	**Cheryl Gillan** **26,298 (50.4%)**	Michael Brand 12,175 (23.8%)	Paul Andrews 2,528 (4.8%)	C Shilson (UKIP) 618 (1.2%) Hugh Godfrey (NLP) 193 (0.1%)	Cheryl Gillan
Milton Keynes North East	**Brian White** **20,201 (39.43%)**	Peter Butler 19,961 (38.96%)	Graham Mabbutt 8,907 (17.38%)	Michael Phillips 1,492 (2.91%)	Alan Francis (Green) 576 (1.12%) Martin Simson (NLP) 99 (0.19%)	Peter Butler
Milton Keynes South West	**Phyllis Starkey** **27,298 (53.8%)**	Barry Legg 17,006 (33.5%)	Peter Jones 6,065 (12.0%)		Hugh Kelly (NLP) 389 (0.8%)	Barry Legg
Wycombe	Chris Bryant 18,520 (35.4%)	**Ray Whitney** **20,890 (39.9%)**	Paul Bensilum 9,678 (18.5%)	Alan Fulford 2,394 (4.6%)	John Laker (Green) 71 (1.4%) Mark Heath (NLP) 121 (0.2%)	Ray Whitney

==== East Sussex ====
East Sussex elected 8 Members of Parliament in 8 parliamentary constituencies – 4 borough constituencies and 4 county constituencies.

Constituency	Candidates					Incumbent
Constituency	Labour	Conservative	Liberal Democrat	Referendum	Other	Incumbent
Bexhill and Battle	Robert D. Beckwith 8,866 (18.1%)	**Charles Wardle** **23,570 (48.1%)**	Kathryn M. Field 12,470 (25.5%)	Vanessa Thompson 3,302 (6.7%)	John Pankhurst (UKIP) 786 (1.6%)	Charles Wardle
Brighton Kemptown	**Des Turner** **21,479 (46.6%)**	Andrew Bowden 17,945 (38.9%%)	Clive Gray 4,478 (9.7%)	David Inman 1,526 (3.3%)	Hannah Williams (SLP) 316 (0.7%) Jeremy Bowler (NLP) 172 (0.4%) Lorrie Newman (OMRLP) 123 (0.3%) Richard Darlow (RDT) 93 (0.2%)	Andrew Bowden
Brighton Pavilion	**David Lepper** **26,737 (54.6%)**	Derek Spencer 13,556 (27.7%)	Kenneth Blanshard 4,644 (9.5%)	Peter Stocken 1,304 (2.7%)	Peter West (Green) 1,249 (2.6%) Richard Huggett (Ind. Con.) 1,098 (2.2%) Frank Stevens (UKIP) 179 (0.4%) Bob Dobbs (Ind.) 125 (0.3%) Alan Card (RDT) 59 (0.1%)	Derek Spencer
Eastbourne	David Lines 6,576 (12.5%)	**Nigel Waterson** **22,183 (42.1%)**	Chris Berry 20,189 (38.3%)	Trevor Lowe 2,724 (5.2%)	Theresia Williamson (Liberal) 741 (1.4%) John Dawkins (NLP) 254 (0.5%)	Nigel Waterson
Hastings and Rye	**Michael Foster** **16,867 (34.4%)**	Jacqui Lait 14,307 (29.2%)	Monroe Palmer 13,717 (28.0%)	Christopher J.M. McGovern 2,511 (5.1%)	Jane M.E. Amstad (Liberal) 1,046 (2.1%) W.N. Andrews (UKIP) 472 (1.0%) Derek Tiverton (OMRLP) 149 (0.3%)	Jacqui Lait
Hove	**Ivor Caplin** **21,458 (44.6%)**	Robert Guy 17,499 (36.4%)	Thomas Pearce 4,645 (9.7%)	Stuart R. Field 1,931 (4.0%)	John P. Furness (Ind. Con.) 1,735 (3.6%) Philip A.T. Mulligan (Green) 644 (1.3%) J.E. Vause (UKIP) 209 (0.4%)	Tim Sainsbury†
Lewes	Mark Patton 5,232 (10.6%)	Tim Rathbone 19,950 (40.6%)	**Norman Baker** **21,250 (43.2%)**	Lucille Butler 2,481 (5.0%)	John Harvey (UKIP) 256 (0.5%)	Tim Rathbone
Wealden	Nicholas Levine 10,185 (17.2%)	**Geoffrey Johnson-Smith** **29,417 (49.8%)**	Michael Skinner 15,213 (26.7%)	Barry Taplin 3,527 (6.0%)	Margaret English (UKIP) 569 (0.9%) Paul Cragg (NLP) 188 (0.3%)	Geoffrey Johnson-Smith

==== Hampshire ====
Hampshire elected 17 Members of Parliament in 17 parliamentary constituencies – 7 borough constituencies and 10 county constituencies.

Constituency	Candidates					Incumbent
Constituency	Labour	Conservative	Liberal Democrat	Referendum	Other	Incumbent
Aldershot	Terence Bridgeman 13,057 (24.1%)	**Gerald Howarth** **23,119 (42.7%)**	Adrian Collett 16,498 (30.5%)		John Howe (UKIP) 794 (1.5%) Arthur Uther Pendragon (Independent) 361 (0.7%) Donald Stevens (BNP) 322 (0.6%)	Julian Critchley†
Basingstoke	Nigel Lickley 22,354 (39.1%)	**Andrew Hunter** **24,751 (43.3%)**	Martin Rimmer 9,714 (17.0%)		Elsayed Selim (Independent) 310 (0.6%)	Andrew Hunter
East Hampshire	Robert Hoyle 9,945 (17.1%)	**Michael Mates** **27,927 (48.0%)**	Robert Booker 16,337 (28.1%)	John Hayter 2,757 (4.7%)	Ian Foster (Green) 649 (1.1%) Stephen Coles (UKIP) 513 (0.9%)	Michael Mates
Eastleigh	Alan Lloyd 14,883 (26.8%)	Stephen Reid 18,699 (33.7%)	**David Chidgey** **19,453 (35.1%)**	Victor Eldridge 2,013 (3.6%)	P.W. Robinson (UKIP) 446 (0.8%)	David Chidgey
Fareham	Michael A. Prior 14,078 (27.0%)	**Peter Lloyd** **24,436 (46.8%)**	Grace Hill 10,234 (19.6%)	Dayne Markham 2,914 (5.6%)	William O'Brien (No to Europe) 515 (1.0%)	Peter Lloyd
Gosport	Ivan Gray 14,827 (30.7%)	**Peter Viggers** **21,085 (43.6%)**	Steve Hogg 9,479 (19.6%)	Andrew Blowers 2,538 (5.3%)	Patrick Ettie (Independent) 426 (0.9%)	Peter Viggers
Havant	Lynne Armstrong 15,475 (32.4%)	**David Willetts** **19,204 (39.7%)**	Michael Kooner 10,806 (22.4%)	Anthony Green 2,395 (5.0%)	Major Atwal (British Isles People First Party) 442 (0.9%)	David Willetts
New Forest East	Alan Goodfellow 12,161 (24.8%)	**Julian Lewis** **21,053 (42.9%)**	George Dawson 15,838 (32.3%)			Patrick McNair-Wilson† (New Forest)
New Forest West	David R. Griffiths 7,092 (14.3%)	**Desmond Swayne** **25,149 (50.6%)**	Robert C.H. Hale 13,817 (27.8%)	Maureen A. Elliott 2,150 (4.3%)	Michael Holmes (UKIP) 1,542 (3.1%)	Patrick McNair-Wilson† (New Forest)
North East Hampshire	Peter Dare 8,203 (16.0%)	**James Arbuthnot**‡ **26,017 (50.9%)**	Ian Mann 11,619 (22.7%)	Winston Rees 2,420 (4.7%)	Keki Jessavala (Independent) 2,400 (4.7%) Christopher Berry (UKIP) 452 (0.9%)	New constituency
North West Hampshire	Michael Mumford 12,900 (23.6%)	**George Young** **24,730 (45.3%)**	Charlie Fleming 13,179 (24.1%)	Pamela Callaghan 1,533 (2.8%)	Tim Rolt (UKIP) 1,383 (2.5%) William Baxter (Green) 486 (0.9%) Helen Anscomb (Independent anti-Newbury bypass) 231 (0.4%) Bob Dodd (Independent) 225 (0.4%)	David Mitchell†
Portsmouth North	**Syd Rapson** **21,339 (47.1%)**	Peter Griffiths 17,016 (37.6%)	Steven Sollitt 4,788 (10.6%)	Shaun Evelegh 1,757 (3.9%)	Peter Coe (UKIP) 298 (0.7%) Colin Bex (Wessex Regionalist) 72 (0.2%)	Peter Griffiths
Portsmouth South	Alan Burnett 13,086 (25.3%)	David Martin 16,094 (31.1%)	**Mike Hancock** **20,421 (39.5%)**	Christopher Trim 1,629 (3.2%)	John Thompson (Liberal) 184 (0.4%) Jill Evans (UKIP) 141 (0.3%) William Trend (NLP) 140 (0.3%)	David Martin
Romsey	Joanne V. Ford 9,623 (18.6%)	**Michael Colvin** **23,834 (46.0%)**	Mark G. Cooper 15,249 (29.4%)	Michael J. L. Wigley 1,291 (2.5%)	Alan Sked (UKIP) 1,824 (3.5%)	Michael Colvin‡ (Romsey and Waterside)
Southampton Itchen	**John Denham** **29,498 (54.8%)**	Peter Fleet 15,269 (28.4%)	David Harrison 6,289 (11.7%)	John Clegg 1,660 (3.1%)	Kim Rose (SLP) 628 (1.2%) Clive Hoar (UKIP) 172 (0.3%) Gavin Marsh (Socialist) 113 (0.2%) Rosemary Barry (NLP) 110 (0.2%) Ferdi McDermott (PLA) 99 (0.2%)	John Denham
Southampton Test	**Alan Whitehead** **28,396 (54.1%)**	James Hill 14,712 (28.1%)	Alan Dowden 7,171 (13.7%)	Peter Day 1,397 (2.7%)	Howard Marks (LCA) 388 (0.7%) Anthony McCabe (UKIP) 219 (0.4%) Paul Taylor (NLP) 81 (0.2%) John Sinel (NLP) 77 (0.1%)	James Hill
Winchester	Patrick Davies 6,528 (10.5%)	Gerry Malone 26,098 (42.1%)	**Mark Oaten** **26,100 (42.1%)**	Peter Strand 1,598 (2.6%)	Richard Huggett (Oth.) (Note: "Liberal Democrat Top Choice for Parliament") 640 (1.0%) Derek Rumsey (UKIP) 476 (0.8%) John Browne (Ind.) 81 (0.2%) Peter Stockton (OMRLP) 307 (0.5%)	Gerry Malone

==== Isle of Wight ====
The Isle of Wight elected 1 Member of Parliament in 1 parliamentary constituency.

Constituency	Candidates						Incumbent
Constituency	Labour	Conservative	Liberal Democrat	Referendum	UKIP	Other	Incumbent
Isle of Wight	Deborah Gardiner 9,646 (13.2%)	Andrew Turner 24,868 (34.0%)	**Peter Brand** **31,274 (42.7%)**	Tim Bristow 4,734 (6.5%)	Malcom Turner 1,072 (1.5%)	Harry Rees (Independent) 848 (1.2%) Paul Scivier (Green) 544 (0.7%) Clive Daly (NLP) 87 (0.1%) Jonathan Eveleigh (Rainbow Warriors) 86 (0.1%)	Barry Field†

==== Kent ====
Kent elected 17 Members of Parliament in 17 parliamentary constituencies – 1 borough constituency and 16 county constituencies.

Constituency	Candidates					Incumbent
Constituency	Conservative	Labour	Liberal Democrat	Referendum	Other	Incumbent
Ashford	**Damian Green** **22,899 (41.4%)**	John Ennals 17,554 (31.7%)	John Williams 10,901 (19.7%)	Christopher Cruden 3,201 (5.8%)	Richard Boden (Green) 669 (1.2%) Stephen Tyrell (NLP) 89 (0.2%)	Keith Speed†
Canterbury	**Julian Brazier** **20,913 (38.6%)**	Cheryl Hall 16,949 (31.3%)	Martin Vye 12,854 (23.8%)	James Osborne 2,460 (4.5%)	Geoffrey Meaden (Green) 588 (1.1%) John Moore (UKIP) 281 (0.5%) Andrew Pringle (NLP) 64 (0.1%)	Julian Brazier
Chatham and Aylesford	Richard Knox-Johnston 18,401 (37.4%)	**Jonathan Shaw** **21,191 (43.1%)**	Robin Murray 7,389 (15.0%)	Keith Riddle 1,538 (3.1%)	Alan Harding (UKIP) 493 (1.0%) Timothy Martell (NLP) 149 (0.3%)	Andrew Rowe‡ (Mid Kent)
Dartford	Bob Dunn 20,950 (40.3%)	**Howard Stoate** **25,278 (48.6%)**	Dorothy Webb 4,872 (9.4%)		Paul McHale (BNP) 424 (0.8%) Peter Homden (Fancy Dress Party) 287 (0.5%) James Pollitt (Christian Democrat) 228 (0.4%)	Bob Dunn
Dover	David Shaw 17,796 (32.8%)	**Gwyn Prosser** **29,535 (54.5%)**	Mark B. Corney 4,302 (7.9%)	Susan L. Anderson 2,124 (3.9%)	C. Hyde (UKIP) 443 (0.8%)	David Shaw
Faversham and Mid Kent	**Andrew Rowe** **22,016 (44.4%)**	Alan Stewart 17,843 (36.0%)	Bruce E. Parmenter 6,138 (12.4%)	Robin M. Birley 2,073 (4.2%)	Norman W. Davidson (OMRLP) 511 (1.0%) Michael J. Cunningham (UKIP) 431 (0.9%) David J. Currer (Green) 380 (0.8%) Caroline Morgan (Oth.) 115 (0.2%) Nigel P.J. Pollard (NLP) 99 (0.2%)	Andrew Rowe‡ (Mid Kent)
Folkestone and Hythe	**Michael Howard** **20,313 (39.0%)**	Peter Doherty 12,939 (24.9%)	David Laws 13,981 (26.9%)	John Aspinall 4,188 (8.0%)	John Baker (UKIP) 378 (0.7%) Michael J. Cunningham (Socialist) 431 (0.9%) Raymond Saint (Oth.) 69 (0.1%)	Michael Howard
Gillingham	James Couchman 18,207 (35.9%)	**Paul Clark** **20,187 (39.9%)**	Robert Sayer 9,649 (19.0%)	Geoffrey Cann 1,492 (2.9%)	Craig Mackinlay (UKIP) 590 (1.2%) David Robinson (OMRLP) 305 (0.6%) Christopher Jury (BNP) 194 (0.4%) Gabriel Duguay (NLP) 58 (0.1%)	James Couchman
Gravesham	Jacques Arnold 20,681 (38.8%)	**Chris Pond** **26,460 (49.7%)**	Merilyn Canet 4,128 (7.8%)	Patricia Curtis 1,441 (2.7%)	Anthony Leyshon (Independent Labour) 414 (0.8%) David Palmer (NLP) 129 (0.2%)	Jacques Arnold
Maidstone and The Weald	**Ann Widdecombe** **23,657 (44.1%)**	John Morgan 14,054 (26.2%)	Jane Nelson 11,986 (22.4%)	Sarah Hopkins 1,998 (3.7%)	Maureen Cleator (SLP) 479 (1.8%) Penelope Kemp (Green) 480 (0.9%) Ruth Owens (UKIP) 339 (0.6%) John Oldbury (NLP) 115 (0.2%)	Ann Widdecombe‡ (Maidstone)
Medway	Peggy Fenner 16,504 (36.9%)	**Bob Marshall-Andrews** **21,858 (48.9%)**	Roger D.C. Roberts 4,555 (10.2%)	Joseph Main 1,420 (3.2%)	Susan P. Radlett (UKIP) 405 (0.9%)	Peggy Fenner
Sevenoaks	**Michael Fallon** **22,776 (45.4%)**	John Hayes 12,315 (24.6%)	Roger Walshe 12,086 (24.1%)	Nigel Large 2,138 (4.3%)	Margot Lawrence (Green) 443 (0.9%) Mark Ellis (Pathfinders) 244 (0.5%) Alex Hankey (NLP) 147 (0.3%)	Mark Wolfson
Sittingbourne and Sheppey	Roger Moate 16,794 (36.4%)	**Derek Wyatt** **18,723 (40.6%)**	Roger Truelove 8,447 (18.3%)	Peter Moull 1,082 (2.3%)	Chris "Screwy" Driver (OMRLP) 644 (1.4%) Nico Risi (UKIP) 472 (1.0%)	Roger Moate‡ (Faversham)
North Thanet	**Roger Gale** **21,586 (44.1%)**	Iris Johnston 18,820 (38.4%)	Paul Kendrick 5,576 (11.4%)	Marcus Chambers 2,535 (5.2%)	Jean Haines (UKIP) 438 (0.9%)	Roger Gale
South Thanet	Jonathan Aitken 17,899 (39.8%)	**Stephen Ladyman** **20,777 (46.2%)**	Barbara Hewitt-Silk 5,263 (11.7%)		C. Crook (UKIP) 631 (1.4%) David Wheatley (Green) 418 (0.9%)	Jonathan Aitken
Tonbridge and Malling	**John Stanley** **23,640 (48.0%)**	Barbara Withstandley 13,410 (27.2%)	Keith Brown 9,467 (19.2%)	John Scrivenor 2,005 (4.1%)	B. Bullen (UKIP) 502 (1.0%) Gerard Valente (NLP) 205 (0.4%)	John Stanley
Tunbridge Wells	**Archie Norman** **21,853 (45.2%)**	Peter Warne 9,879 (20.2%)	Anthony S. Clayton 14,347 (29.7%)	Tim Macpherson 1,858 (3.8%)	M. Smart (UKIP) 264 (0.5%) Paul Levy (NLP) 153 (0.3%)	Patrick Mayhew†

==== Oxfordshire ====
Oxfordshire elected 6 Members of Parliament in 6 parliamentary constituencies – 1 borough constituency and 5 county constituencies.

Constituency	Candidates					Incumbent
Constituency	Conservative	Labour	Liberal Democrat	Referendum	Other	Incumbent
Banbury	**Tony Baldry** **25,076 (42.9%)**	Hazel Y. Peperell 20,339 (34.8%)	Catherine Bearder 9,761 (16.7%)	James W. Ager 2,245 (3.8%)	Bevis Cotton (Green) 530 (0.9%) L. King (UKIP) 364 (0.6%) Ian Pearson (NLP) 131 (0.2%)	Tony Baldry
Henley	**Michael Heseltine** **23,908 (46.4%)**	Duncan Enright 11,700 (22.7%)	Tim Horton 12,741 (24.7%)	Sebastian Sainsbury 2,299 (4.5%)	Susan Miles (Green) 514 (1.0%) Nigel Barlow (NLP) 221 (0.4%) Thomas Hibbert (Whig Party) 160 (0.3%)	Michael Heseltine
Oxford East	Jonathan Djanogly 10,540 (22.0%)	**Andrew Smith** **27,205 (56.8%)**	George Kershaw 7,038 (14.7%)	John Young 1,391 (2.9%)	Craig Simmons (Green) 975 (2.0%) David Harper-Jones (PLA) 318 (0.7%) Peter Gardner (UKIP) 234 (0.5%) John Thompson (NLP) 108 (0.2%) Pathmanathan Mylvaganam (Oth.) (Note: Independent Anti-majority Democracy) 68 (0.2%)	Andrew Smith
Oxford West and Abingdon	Laurence Harris 19,983 (32.7%)	Susan Brown 12,361 (20.2%)	**Evan Harris** **26,268 (42.9%)**	Gillian Eustace 1,258 (2.1%)	Mike Woodin (Green) 691 (1.1%) Rodney Buckton (UKIP) 258 (0.4%) Linda Hodge (PLA) 238 (0.4%) Anne Wilson (NLP) 91 (0.1%) John Rose (Local Government) 48 (0.1%)	John Patten†
Wantage	**Robert Jackson** **22,311 (39.8%)**	Celia Wilson 16,222 (28.9%)	Jenny Riley 14,862 (26.5%)	Stuart Rising 1,549 (2.8%)	Miriam Kennet (Green) 640 (1.1%) Nikolai Tolstoy (UKIP) 465 (0.8%)	Robert Jackson
Witney	**Shaun Woodward** **24,282 (43.0%)**	Alexander J Hollingsworth 17,254 (30.6%)	Angela Lawrence 11,202 (19.9%)	Geoffrey Brown 2,262 (4.0%)	Michael Montgomery (UKIP) 765 (1.4%) Sue N Chapple-Perrie (Green) 636 (1.1%)	Douglas Hurd†

==== Surrey ====
Surrey elected 11 Members of Parliament in 11 parliamentary constituencies – 4 borough constituencies and 7 county constituencies.

Constituency	Candidates					Incumbent
Constituency	Conservative	Labour	Liberal Democrat	Referendum	Other	Incumbent
East Surrey	**Peter Ainsworth** **27,389 (50.1%)**	David Ross 11,573 (21.2%)	Belinda Ford 12,296 (22.5%)	Michael Sydney 2,656 (4.9%)	Tony Stone (UKIP) 569 (1.0%) Susan Bartrum (NLP) 173 (0.3%)	Peter Ainsworth
Epsom and Ewell	**Archie Hamilton** **24,717 (45.6%)**	Philip Woodford 13,192 (24.3%)	John Vincent 12,380 (22.8%)	Christopher Macdonald 2,355 (4.3%)	Harold Green (UKIP) 544 (1.0%) Hugo Charlton (Green) 527 (1.%) Katherine Weeks (PLA) 466 (0.9%)	Archie Hamilton
Esher and Walton	**Ian Taylor** **26,747 (49.8%)**	Julie A. Reay 12,219 (22.8%)	Gary M. Miles 10,937 (20.4%)	Andrew A.C. Cruickshank 2,904 (5.4%)	Bernard Collignon (UKIP) 558 (1.0%) Simone Kay (Rainbow Dream Ticket) 302 (0.6%)	Ian Taylor‡ (Esher)
Guildford	**Nick St Aubyn** **24,230 (42.5%)**	Joseph Burns 9,945 (17.5%)	Margaret Sharp 19,439 (34.1%)	James Gore 2,650 (4.7%)	Robert McWhirter (UKIP) 400 (0.7%) John Morris (Peace) 294 (0.5%)	David Howell†
Mole Valley	**Paul Beresford** **26,178 (48.0%)**	Christopher Payne 8,057 (14.8%)	Stephen Cooksey 15,957 (29.3%)	Nick Taber 2,424 (4.4%)	Richard Burley (Ind. Con.) 1,276 (2.3%) Ian Cameron (UKIP) 435 (0.8%) Judith Thomas (NLP) 197 (0.4%)	Kenneth Baker†
Reigate	**Crispin Blunt** **21,123 (43.8%)**	Andrew Howard 13,382 (27.8%)	Peter Samuel 9,615 (20.0%)	George Gardiner 3,352 (7.0%)	Richard Higgs (Ind.) 412 (0.9%) Stephen Smith (UKIP) 290 (0.6%)	George Gardiner
Runnymede and Weybridge	**Philip Hammond** **25,051 (48.6%)**	Ian Peacock 15,176 (29.4%)	Geoffrey Taylor 8,397 (16.3%)	Peter Rolt 2,150 (4.2%)	Simon Slater (UKIP) 625 (1.2%) Jeremy Sleeman (NLP) 162 (0.3%)	Geoffrey Pattie† (Chertsey and Walton)
South West Surrey	**Virginia Bottomley** **25,165 (44.6%)**	Margaret Leicester 5,333 (9.4%)	Neil Sherlock 22,471 (39.8%)	Judith Clementson 2,830 (5.0%)	James Kirby (UKIP) 401 (0.7%) Josephine Quintavalle (PLA) 258 (0.5%)	Virginia Bottomley
Spelthorne	**David Wilshire** **23,306 (44.9%)**	Keith Dibble 19,833 (38.2%)	Edward Glynn 6,821 (13.1%)	Barney Coleman 1,495 (2.9%)	John Fowler (UKIP) 462 (0.9%)	David Wilshire
Surrey Heath	**Nick Hawkins** **28,231 (51.6%)**	Susan Jones 11,511 (21.0%)	David Newman 11,944 (21.8%)	John Gale 2,385 (4.4%)	Richard Squire (UKIP) 653 (1.2%)	Michael Grylls† (North West Surrey)
Woking	**Humfrey Malins** **19,553 (38.4%)**	Katie Hanson 10,695 (21.0%)	Philip Goldenberg 13,875 (27.3%)	Christopher Skeate 2,209 (4.3%)	Hugh Bell (Ind. Con.) 3,933 (7.7%) Michael Harvey (UKIP) 512 (1.0%) Deirdre Sleeman (NLP) 137 (0.3%)	Cranley Onslow†

==== West Sussex ====
West Sussex elected 8 Members of Parliament in 8 parliamentary constituencies – 2 borough constituencies and 6 county constituencies.

Constituency	Candidates					Incumbent
Constituency	Conservative	Labour	Liberal Democrat	Referendum	Other	Incumbent
Arundel and South Downs	**Howard Flight** **27,251 (53.1%)**	Richard Black 9,376 (18.3%)	John Goss 13,216 (25.7%)		James Herbert (UKIP) 1,494 (2.9%)	Michael Marshall† (Arundel)
Bognor Regis and Littlehampton	**Nick Gibb** **20,537 (44.2%)**	Roger A. Nash 13,216 (28.5%)	James M.M. Walsh 11,153 (24.0%)		George Stride (UKIP) 1,537 (3.3%)	Michael Marshall† (Arundel)
Chichester	**Andrew Tyrie** **25,895 (46.4%)**	Charlie Smith 9,605 (17.2%)	Peter Gardiner 16,161 (29.0%)	Douglas Denny 3,318 (5.9%)	J.G. Rix (UKIP) 800 (1.4%)	Anthony Nelson†
Crawley	Josephine Crabb 16,043 (31.8%)	**Laura Moffatt** **27,750 (55.1%)**	Harold De Souza 4,141 (8.2%)	Ronald Walters 1,931 (3.8%)	Eric Saunders (UKIP) 322 (0.6%) Arshad Khan (Justice Party) 230 (0.5%)	Nicholas Soames‡
East Worthing and Shoreham	**Tim Loughton** **20,864 (40.5%)**	Mark Williams 12,335 (23.9%)	Martin King 15,766 (30.6%)	James McCulloch 1,683 (3.3%)	Rosemary Jarvis (UKIP) 921 (1.8%)	Michael Stephen† (Shoreham)
Horsham	**Francis Maude** **29,015 (50.7%)**	Maureen Walsh 10,691 (18.7%)	Morwen Millson 14,153 (24.8%)	Robin Grant 2,281 (4.0%)	Hugo Miller (UKIP) 819 (1.4%) Malcolm Courbould (Ind.) 206 (0.4%)	Peter Hordern†
Mid Sussex	**Nicholas Soames** **23,231 (43.5%)**	Mervyn Hamilton 9,969 (18.6%)	Margaret Collins 16,377 (30.6%)	Tam Large 3,146 (5.9%)	J.V. Barnett (UKIP) 606 (1.1%) Ernest Tudway (Oth.) (Note: Justice and Renewal Independent Party) 134 (0.3%)	Tim Renton†
Worthing West	**Peter Bottomley** **23,733 (46.1%)**	John Adams 8,347 (16.2%)	Christopher Hare 16,020 (31.1%)	Nick John 2,313 (4.5%)	Timothy Cross (UKIP) 1,029 (2.0%)	Terence Higgins† (Worthing)

=== South West England ===
South West England, elected 51 Members of Parliament across 7 counties; Bristol, Cornwall, Devon, Dorset, Gloucestershire, Somerset and Wiltshire

==== Bristol ====
Bristol elected 4 Members of Parliament in 4 seats – 4 borough constituencies.

Constituency	Candidates					Incumbent
Constituency	Labour	Conservative	Liberal Democrat	Referendum	Other	Incumbent
Bristol East	**Jean Corston** **27,418 (56.9%)**	Ed Vaizey 11,259 (23.4%)	Peter Tyzack 7,121 (14.8%)	Gerry Philip 1,479 (3.1%)	Paul Williams (SLP) 766 (1.6%) John McLaggan (NLP) 158 (0.3%)	Jean Corston
Bristol North West	**Doug Naysmith** **27,575 (49.9%)**	Michael Stern 16,193 (29.3%)	Ian Parry 7,263 (13.2%)	John Quintanillia 1,609 (2.9%)	Charles Horton (Ind. Lab.) 1,718 (3.1%) Giles Shorter (SLP) 482 (0.9%) Stephen Parnell (BNP) 265 (0.5%) Thomas Leighton (NLP) 140 (0.3%)	David Madel
Bristol South	**Dawn Primarolo** **29,890 (60.0%)**	Michael Roe 10,562 (21.2%)	Stephen Williams 6,691 (13.4%)	Derek W. Guy 1,486 (3.0%)	John H. Boxall (Green) 722 (1.5%) Ian P. Marshall (SP) 355 (0.7%) Louis P. Taylor (GBP) 153 (0.3%)	Dawn Primarolo
Bristol West	**Valerie Davey** **22,068 (35.2%)**	William Waldegrave 20,575 (32.8%)	Charles R. Boney 17,551 (28.0%)	Margot Beauchamp 1,304 (2.1%)	Justin Quinnell (Green) 852 (1.4%) Roy Nurse (SLP) 244 (0.4%) Jai Brierley (NLP) 47 (0.1%)	William Waldegrave

==== Cornwall ====
Cornwall elected 5 Members of Parliament in 5 seats – 5 county constituencies.

Constituency	Candidates					Incumbent
Constituency	Labour	Conservative	Liberal Democrat	Referendum	Other	Incumbent
Falmouth and Camborne	**Candy Atherton** **18,151 (33.8%)**	Sebastian Coe 15,463 (28.8%)	Terrye Jones 13,512 (25.2%)	Peter de Savary 3,534 (6.6%)	John Geach (Ind. Lab.) 1,691 (3.2%) Paul Holmes (Liberal) 527 (1.0%) Robert Smith (UKIP) 355 (0.7%) Ruth Lewarne (MK) 238 (0.4%) Gary Glitter (OMRLP) 161 (0.3%)	Sebastian Coe
North Cornwall	Anne Lindo 5,523 (9.4%)	Nigel Linacre 17,253 (29.5%)	**Paul Tyler** **31,100 (53.2%)**	Felicity Odam 3,636 (6.2%)	John Bolitho (MK) 645 (1.1%) Rif Winfield (Liberal) 186 (0.3%) Nicholas Creswell (NLP) 152 (0.3%)	Paul Tyler
South East Cornwall	Dorothy M. Kirk 7,358 (12.8%)	Warwick Lightfoot 20,564 (35.8%)	**Colin Breed** **27,044 (47.1%)**		James Wonnacott (UKIP) 1,428 (2.5%) Paul Dunbar (MK) 573 (1.0%) Bill Weights (Liberal) 527 (0.5%) Margot Hartley (NLP) 140 (0.3%)	Robert Hicks†
St Ives	Christopher Fegan 8,184 (15.2%)	William Rogers 16,796 (31.2%)	**Andrew George** **23,966 (44.5%)**	Michael Faulkner 3,714 (6.9%)	Patricia Garnier (UKIP) 567 (1.1%) Frederick Stephens (Liberal) 425 (0.8%) Kevin Lippiat (Ind.) 178 (0.3%) Margot Hartley (NLP) 71 (0.1%)	David Harris
Truro and St Austell	Michael Dooley 8,697 (15.3%)	Neil Badcock 15,001 (26.4%)	**Matthew Taylor** **27,502 (48.5%)**	Carl Hearn 3,682 (6.5%)	Alan Haithwaite (UKIP) 576 (1.0%) Dorienne Robinson (Green) 482 (0.8%) Davyth Hicks (MK) 450 (0.8%) Lorna Yelland (Ind.) 240 (0.4%) Peter Bolland (NLP) 117 (0.2%)	Matthew Taylor (Truro)

==== Devon ====
Devon elected 11 Members of Parliament in 11 seats – 7 county constituencies and 4 borough constituencies.

Constituency	Candidates					Incumbent
Constituency	Conservative	Labour	Liberal Democrat	Referendum	Other	Incumbent
East Devon	**Peter Emery** **22,797 (43.4%)**	Andrew Siantonas 9,292 (17.7%)	Rachel Trethewey 15,308 (29.1%)	William Dixon 3,200 (6.1%)	Geoffrey Halliwell (Liberal) 1,363 (2.6%) Colin Giffard (UKIP) 459 (0.9%) Gary Needs (ND) 131 (0.2%)	Peter Emery‡ (Honiton)
Exeter	Adrian Rogers 17,693 (28.6%)	**Ben Bradshaw** **29,398 (47.5%)**	Dennis Brewer 11,148 (18.0%)		David Morrish (Liberal) 2,062 (3.3%) Paul Edwards (Green) 643 (1.0%) Corrine Haynes (UKIP) 638 (1.0%) James Meakin (Pensioners) 282 (0.5%)	John Hannam†
North Devon	Richard Ashworth 21,643 (39.5%)	Eithne "Annie" Brenton 5,347 (9.8%)	**Nick Harvey** **27,824 (50.8%)**			Nick Harvey
Plymouth Devonport	Anthony Johnson 12,562 (24.2%)	**David Jamieson** **31,629 (60.9%)**	Richard Corpus 5,570 (10.7%)	Clive Norsworthy 1,486 (2.9%)	Caroline Farrand (UKIP) 478 (0.9%) Stephen Ebbs (ND) 238 (0.4%)	David Jamieson
Plymouth Sutton	Andrew Crisp 14,441 (30.3%)	**Linda Gilroy** **23,881 (50.1%)**	Steve Melia 6,613 (13.9%)	Tim Hanbury 1,654 (3.5%)	Roger Bullock (UKIP) 499 (1.1%) Kevin Kelway (Plymouth First Group) 396 (0.8%) Frank Lyons (NLP) 168 (0.4%)	Gary Streeter‡
South West Devon	**Gary Streeter** **22,659 (42.9%)**	Christopher Mavin 15,262 (28.9%)	Keith Baldry 12,542 (23.8%)	Robert Saddler 1,668 (3.2%)	H.M. King (UKIP) 491 (0.9%) Jon Hyde (NLP) 159 (0.3%)	New constituency
Teignbridge	**Patrick Nicholls** **24,679 (39.2%)**	Sue Dann 11,311 (18.0%)	Richard Younger-Ross 24,398( 238.8)		S. Stokes (UKIP) 1,601 (2.5%) Nick Banwell (Green) 817 (1.3%) Lorraine Golding (Rainbow Dream Ticket) 139 (0.2%)	Patrick Nicholls
Tiverton and Honiton	**Angela Browning** **24,438 (41.3%)**	John King 7,598 (12.8%)	James Barnard 22,785 (38.5%)	Stephen Lowings 2,952 (5.0%)	Jennifer Roach (Liberal) 635 (1.1%) Emily McIvor (Green) 485 (0.8%) Del Charles (ND) 236 (0.4%)	Angela Browning‡ (Tiverton)
Torbay	Rupert Allason 21,082 (39.5%)	Michael Morey 7,923 (14.9%)	**Adrian Sanders** **21,094 (39.6%)**		Graham Booth (UKIP) 1,962 (3.7%) Bruce Cowling (Liberal) 1,161 (2.2%) Paul Wild (Rainbow Dream Ticket) 100 (0.2%)	Rupert Allason
Torridge and West Devon	Ian Liddell-Grainger 22,787 (38.5%)	David Brenton 7,319 (12.4%)	**John Burnett** **24,744 (41.8%)**	Roger Lea 1,946 (3.3%)	Matthew Jackson (UKIP) 1,841 (3.1%) Michael Pithouse (Liberal) 508 (0.9%)	Emma Nicholson†
Totnes	**Anthony Steen** **19,637 (36.5%)**	Victor Ellery 8,796 (16.4%)	Rob Chave 18,760 (34.9%)	Pamela Cook 2,552 (4.7%)	Christopher Venmore (Ind. Con.) 2,369 (4.4%) H.W. Thomas (UKIP) 999 (1.9%) Andy Pratt (Green) 548 (1.0%) James Golding (Ind.) 108 (0.2%)	Anthony Steen‡ (South Hams)

==== Dorset ====
Dorset elected 8 Members of Parliament in 8 seats – 5 county constituencies and 3 borough constituencies.

Constituency	Candidates					Incumbent
Constituency	Conservative	Labour	Liberal Democrat	Referendum	Other	Incumbent
Bournemouth East	**David Atkinson** **17,997 (41.4%)**	Jessica Stevens 9,181 (21.2%)	Douglas Eyre 13,655 (31.4%)	Alan Musgrave-Scott 1,808 (4.2%)	Kenneth Benney (UKIP) 791 (1.8%)	David Atkinson
Bournemouth West	**John Butterfill** **17,115 (41.7%)**	Dennis Gritt 10,093 (24.6%)	Janet Dover 11,405 (27.8%)	Ronald Mills 1,910 (4.7%)	Linda Tooley (UKIP) 281 (0.7%) John Morse (BNP) 165 (0.4%) Alexander Springham (NLP) 103 (0.3%)	David Atkinson
Christchurch	**Christopher Chope** **26,095 (46.4%)**	Charles Mannan 3,884 (6.9%)	Diana Maddock 23,930 (42.6%)	Ray Spencer 1,684 (3.0%)	R.H. Dickinson (UKIP) 606 (1.0%)	Diana Maddock
Mid Dorset and North Poole	**Christopher Fraser** **20,632 (40.7%)**	David Collis 8,014 (15.8%)	Alan Leaman 19,951 (39.3%)	David Nabarro 2,136 (4.2%)		New constituency
North Dorset	**Robert Walter** **23,294 (44.3%)**	John Fitzmaurice 5,380 (10.2%)	Paula Yates 20,548 (39.1%)	Margaret Evans 2,564 (4.9%)	David Wheeler (UKIP) 801 (1.5%)	Nicholas Baker†
Poole	**Robert Syms** **19,726 (42.1%)**	Haydn R. White 10,100 (21.6%)	Alan Tetlow 14,428 (30.8%)	John Riddington 1,932 (4.1%)	Philip Tyler (UKIP) 487 (1.0%) Jennifer Rosta (NLP) 137 (0.3%)	John Ward†
South Dorset	**Ian Bruce** **17,755 (36.1%)**	Jim Knight 17,678 (35.9%)	Michael Plummer 9,936 (20.2%)	Patrick C. McAndrew 2,791 (5.7%)	Malcolm Shakesby (UKIP) 861 (1.8%) Gerald T.H. Napper (NLP) 161 (0.3%)	Ian Bruce
West Dorset	**Oliver Letwin** **22,036 (41.1%)**	Robert Bygraves 9,491 (17.7%)	Robin AS Legg 20,196 (37.7%)		P. Jenkins (UKIP) 1,590 (3.0%) Mark Griffiths (NLP) 239 (0.4%)	James Spicer†

==== Gloucestershire ====
Gloucestershire elected 8 Members of Parliament in 8 seats.

Constituency	Candidates					Incumbent
Constituency	Conservative	Labour	Liberal Democrat	Referendum	Other	Incumbent
Cheltenham	William Todman 18,232 (36.2%)	Barry Leach 5,100 (10.1%)	**Nigel Jones** **24,877 (49.5%)**	Alison Powell 1,065 (2.1%)	Kenneth Hanks (OMRLP) 375 (0.8%) Gordon Cook (UKIP) 302 (0.6%) Anne Harriss (PLA) 245 (0.5%) Sally Brighouse (NLP) 107 (0.2%)	Nigel Jones
Cotswold	**Geoffrey Clifton-Brown** **23,698 (46.4%)**	Barry Leach 5,100 (10.1%)	David Gayler 11,733 (22.9%)	Rupert Lowe 3,393 (6.6%)	Valerie Michael (Green) 560 (1.1%) Henry Brighouse (NLP) 129 (0.3%)	Geoffrey Clifton-Brown‡ (Cirencester and Tewkesbury)
Forest of Dean	Paul Marland 17,860 (35.6%)	**Diana Organ** **24,203 (48.2%)**	Anthony Lynch 6,165 (12.3%)	Dominic Hopkins 1,624 (3.2%)	Gerald Morgan (Ind.) 218 (0.4%) Colin Palmer (Ind.) 80 (0.2%) Stephen Porter (Ind.) 34 (0.1%)	Paul Marland‡ (West Gloucestershire)
Gloucester	Douglas French 20,684 (35.7%)	**Tess Kingham** **28,943 (50.0%)**	Peter Munisamy 6,069 (10.5%)	Andrew Reid 1,482 (2.6%)	A. L. Harris (UKIP) 455 (0.8%) Moira Hamilton (NLP) 281 (0.5%)	Douglas French
Kingswood	Jon Howard 17,928 (29.9%)	**Roger Berry** **32,181 (53.7%)**	Jeanne B. Pinkerton 7,672 (12.9%)	Alexandra Reather 1,463 (2.4%)	Peter Hart (BNP) 290 (0.5%) Andrew Harding (NLP) 238 (0.4%) Andrew Nicolson (Ind.) 115 (0.2%)	Roger Berry
Northavon	John Cope 24,363 (39.0%)	Ronald Stone 9,767 (15.6%)	**Steve Webb** **26,500 (42.4%)**		John Parfitt (UKIP) 1,900 (3.0%)	John Cope
Stroud	Roger Knapman 23,260 (37.9%)	**David Drew** **26,170 (42.7%)**	Paul Hodgkinson 9,502 (15.5%)		John Marjoram (Green) 2,415 (3.9%)	Roger Knapman
Tewkesbury	**Laurence Robertson** **23,859 (45.8%)**	Kelvin Tustin 13,665 (26.2%)	John Sewell 14,625 (28.0%)			Paul Marland‡ (West Gloucestershire)

==== Somerset ====
Somerset elected 9 Members of Parliament in 9 seats.

Constituency	Candidates					Incumbent
Constituency	Conservative	Labour	Liberal Democrat	Referendum	Other	Incumbent
Bath	Alison McNair 16,850 (31.2%)	Tim Bush 8,828 (16.4%)	**Don Foster** **26,169** **(48.5%)**	Tony Cook 1,192 (2.2%)	Richard Scrase (Green) 580 (1.1%) Peter Sandell (UKIP) 315 (0.6%) Nicholas Pullen (NLP) 55 (0.1%)	Don Foster
Bridgwater	**Tom King** **20,174 (36.93%)**	Roger Lavers 13,519 (24.75%)	Michael Hoban 18,378 (33.65%)	Fran Evens 2,551 (4.67%)		Tom King
Somerton and Frome	Mark Robinson 22,554 (39.3%)	Robert Ashford 9,385 (16.3%)	**David Heath** **22,684** **(39.5%)**	Robert Rodwell 2,449 (4.3%)	R.P. Gadd (UKIP) 331 (0.6%)	Mark Robinson
Taunton	David Nicholson 23,621 (38.7%)	Elizabeth Lisgo 8,248 (13.5%)	**Jackie Ballard** **26,064 (42.7%)**	Brian Ahern 2,760 (4.5%)	Leslie Andrews (BNP) 318 (0.5%)	David Nicholson
Wansdyke	Mark Prisk 19,318 (35.3%)	**Dan Norris** **24,117 (44.1%)**	Jeff Manning 9,205 (16.8%)	Kevin Clinton 1,327 (2.4%)	T.S. Hunt (UKIP) 438 (0.8%) Peter House (OMRLP) 225 (0.4%) Sue Lincoln (NLP) 92 (0.2%)	Jack Aspinwall†
Wells	**David Heathcoat-Amory** **22,208 (39.4%)**	Michael Eavis 10,204 (18.1%)	Peter Gold 21,680 (38.5%)	Patricia Phelps 2,196 (3.9%)	Lynn Royse (NLP) 92 (0.2%)	David Heathcoat-Amory
Weston-super-Mare	Margaret Daly 20,133 (37.7%)	Derek Kraft 9,557 (17.9%)	**Brian Cotter** **21,407 (40.1%)**	Tom Sewell 2,280 (4.3%)		Jerry Wiggin†
Woodspring	**Liam Fox** **24,425 (44.4%)**	Debbie Sander 11,377 (20.7%)	Nan Kirsen 16,691 (30.4%)	Richard Hughes 1,641 (3.0%)	Richard Lawson (Green) 667 (1.2%) Andrew Glover (Ind.) 101 (0.2%) Mike Mears (NLP) 66 (0.2%)	Liam Fox
Yeovil	Nicholas Cambrook 14,946 (27.7%)	Patrick Conway 8,053 (14.9%)	**Paddy Ashdown** **26,349 (48.7%)**	John Beveridge 3,574 (6.6%)	David Taylor (Green) 728 (1.3%) John Archer (Ind.) 306 (0.6%) Christopher Hudson (VFYRDT) 97 (0.2%)	Paddy Ashdown

==== Wiltshire ====
Wiltshire elected 6 Members of Parliament in 6 seats – 6 county constituencies.

Constituency	Candidates					Incumbent
Constituency	Conservative	Labour	Liberal Democrat	Referendum	Other	Incumbent
Devizes	**Michael Ancram** **25,710 (42.8%)**	Frank Jeffrey 14,551 (24.2%)	Antony Vickers 15,928 (26.5%)	John Goldsmith 3,021 (5.0%)	S. Oram (UKIP) 622 (1.0%) Stephen Haysom (NLP) 204 (0.3%)	Michael Ancram
North Swindon	Guy Opperman 16,341 (33.8%)	**Michael Wills** **24,029 (49.8%)**	Mike Evemy 6,237 (12.9%)	Gillian Goldsmith 1,533 (3.2%)	Alexander Fisken (NLP) 130 (0.3%)	Simon Coombs‡ (Swindon)
North Wiltshire	**James Gray** **25,390 (43.8%)**	Nigel Knowles 8,261 (14.2%)	Simon Cordon 21,915 (37.8%)	Margaret Purves 1,774 (3.1%)	Alan Wood (UKIP) 410 (0.7%) Joan Forsyth (NLP) 263 (0.4%)	Richard Needham†
Salisbury	**Robert Key** **25,012 (43.0%)**	Ricky Rogers 10,242 (17.6%)	Yvonne Emmerson-Peirce 18,736 (32.2%)		Nigel Farage (UKIP) 3,332 (5.7%) Hamish Soutar (Green) 623 (1.1%) William Holmes (Ind.) 184 (0.3%) Shirley Haysom (NLP) 110 (0.2%)	Robert Key
South Swindon	Simon Coombs 18,298 (35.8%)	**Julia Drown** **23,943 (46.8%)**	Stanley Pajak 7,371 (14.4%)	David McIntosh 1,273 (2.5%)	Richard Charman (Ind.) 181 (0.2%) Keith Buscombe (NLP) 96 (0.2%)	Simon Coombs‡ (Swindon)
Westbury	**David Faber** **23,037 (40.6%)**	Kevin Small 11,969 (21.1%)	John Miller 16,969 (29.9%)	Nick Hawkings-Byass 1,909 (3.4%)	George Hawkins (Liberal) 1,956 (3.4%) R. Westbury (UKIP) 771 (1.4%) Colin Haysom (NLP) 140 (0.2%)	David Faber

=== West Midlands ===
The West Midlands region elected 59 Members of Parliament across 6 counties; Herefordshire, Shropshire, Staffordshire, Warwickshire, the West Midlands metropolitan county and Worcestershire.

==== Herefordshire ====
Herefordshire elected 2 Members of Parliament in 2 seats – 2 county constituencies.

Constituency	Candidates					Incumbent
Constituency	Labour	Conservative	Liberal Democrat	Referendum	Other	Incumbent
Hereford	Chris Chappell 6,596 (12.6%)	Colin Shepherd 18,550 (35.3%)	**Paul Keetch** **25,198** **(47.9%)**	Clive Easton 2,209 (4.2%)		Colin Shepherd
Leominster	Richard Westwood 8,831 (17.5%)	**Peter Temple-Morris** **22,888 (45.3%)**	Terry James 14,053 (27.8%)	Anthony Parkin 2,815 (5.6%)	Felicity Norman (Green) 1,086 (2.1%) Richard Chamings (UKIP) 588 (1.2%) John Haycock (BNP) 292 (0.6%)	Peter Temple-Morris

==== Shropshire ====
Shropshire elected 5 Members of Parliament in 5 seats – 1 borough constituency and 4 county constituencies.

Constituency	Candidates					Incumbent
Constituency	Conservative	Labour	Liberal Democrat	Referendum	Other	Incumbent
Ludlow	**Christopher Gill** **19,633 (42.4%)**	Nuala O'Kane 11,745 (25.4%)	Ian Huffer 13,724 (29.7%)		Tim Andrewes (Green) 798 (1.7%) Eric Freeman-Keel (UKIP) 385 (0.8%)	Christopher Gill
North Shropshire	**Owen Paterson** **20,730 (40.2%)**	Ian Lucas 18,535 (36.0%)	John Stevens 10,489 (20.4%)	Denis Allen 1,764 (3.4%)		John Biffen†
Shrewsbury and Atcham	Derek Conway 18,814 (34.0%)	**Paul Marsden** **20,484 (37.0%)**	Anne Woolland 13,838 (25.0%)	Dylan Barker 1,346 (2.4%)	David Rowlands (UKIP) 385 (0.8%) Alan Dignan (Country, Field and Shooting Sports) 257 (0.5%) Alan Williams (People's Party) 128 (0.8%)	Derek Conway
Telford	Bernard Gentry 10,166 (27.4%)	**Bruce Grocott** **21,456 (57.8%)**	Nathaniel Green 4,371 (11.8%)	Christopher Morris 1,119 (3.0%)		Bruce Grocott† (The Wrekin)
The Wrekin	Peter Bruinvels 18,218 (40.2%)	**Peter Bradley** **21,243 (46.9%)**	Ian Jenkins 5,807 (12.8%)			Bruce Grocott† (The Wrekin)

==== Staffordshire ====
Staffordshire elected 12 Members of Parliament in 12 seats – 4 borough constituencies and 8 county constituencies.

Constituency	Candidates					Incumbent
Constituency	Labour	Conservative	Liberal Democrat	Referendum	Other	Incumbent
Burton	**Janet Dean** **27,810 (51.0%)**	Ivan Lawrence 21,480 (39.4%)	David A. Fletcher 4,617 (8.5%)		Keith Sharp (ND) 604 (1.1%)	Ivan Lawrence
Cannock Chase	**Tony Wright** **28,705 (54.8%)**	John Backhouse 14,227 (27.2%)	Richard Kirby 4,537 (8.7%)	Peter Froggatt 1,663 (3.2%)	William Hurley (New Labour) 1,615 (3.1%) Mick Conroy (Socialist Labour) 1,552 (2.1%) Melvyn Hartshorne (OMRLP) 499 (1.0%)	Tony Wright‡ (Cannock & Burntwood)
Lichfield	Susan Woodward 20,615 (42.4%)	**Michael Fabricant** **20,853 (42.9%)**	Phil Bennion 5,473 (11.3%)	George Seward 1,652 (3.4%)		Michael Fabricant‡ (Mid Staffordshire)
Newcastle-under-Lyme	**Llin Golding** **27,743 (56.5%)**	Marcus Hayes 10,537 (21.5%)	Robin Studd 6,858 (14.0%)	Kim Suttle 1,510 (3.1%)	Steven Mountford (Liberal) 1,399 (2.9%) Bridget Bell (Socialist Labour) 1,082 (2.2%)	Llin Golding
South Staffordshire	Judith LeMaistre 17,747 (34.7%)	**Patrick Cormack** **25,568 (50.0%)**	Jamie Calder 5,797 (11.3%)	Peter Carnell 2,002 (3.9%)		Patrick Cormack
Stafford	**David Kidney** **24,606 (47.5%)**	David Cameron 20,292 (39.2%)	Pam A. Hornby 5,480 (10.6%)	Stephen R. Culley 1,146 (2.2%)	Ashton A.N. May (OMRLP) 248 (0.5%)	Bill Cash‡ (Stafford)
Staffordshire Moorlands	**Charlotte Atkins** **26,686 (52.2%)**	Andrew Ashworth 16,637 (32.6%)	Christina Jebb 6,191 (12.1%)	David Stanworth 1,603 (3.1%)		David Knox†
Stoke-on-Trent Central	**Mark Fisher** **26,662 (66.2%)**	Neil Jones 6,738 (16.7%)	Ed Fordham 4,809 (11.9%)	Peter Stanyer 1,071 (2.7%)	Michael Coleman (BNP) 606 (1.5%) Fran M. Oborski (Liberal) 359 (0.9%)	Mark Fisher
Stoke-on-Trent North	**Joan Walley** **25,190 (65.2%)**	Christopher Day 7,798 (20.2%)	Henry Jebb 4,141 (10.7%)	Jennefer Tobin 1,537 (4.0%)		Joan Walley
Stoke-on-Trent South	**George Stevenson** **28,645 (62.0%)**	Sheila Scott 10,342 (22.4%)	Peter Barnett 4,710 (10.2%)	Richard Adams 1,103 (2.4%)	Alison Micklem (Liberal) 580 (1.3%) Steven Batkin (BNP) 568 (1.2%) Brian Lawrence (ND) 288 (0.6%)	George Stevenson
Stone	John Wakefield 21,041 (39.6%)	**Bill Cash** **24,859 (46.8%)**	Barry Stamp 6,392 (12.0%)		Ann Winfield (Liberal) 545 (1.0%) Dinah Grice (NLP) 237 (0.4%)	Bill Cash‡ (Stafford)
Tamworth	**Brian Jenkins** **25,808 (51.8%)**	Lady Lightbown 18,312 (36.7%)	Jennifer Pinkett 4,025 (8.1%)	Dianne Livesey 1,163 (2.3%)	Christopher Lamb (UKIP) 369 (0.7%) Catherine Twelvetrees (Liberal) 177 (0.4%)	Brian Jenkins‡ (South East Staffordshire)

==== Warwickshire ====
Warwickshire elected 5 Members of Parliament in 5 seats – 5 county constituencies.

Constituency	Candidates					Incumbent
Constituency	Labour	Conservative	Liberal Democrat	Referendum	Other	Incumbent
North Warwickshire	**Mike O'Brien** **31,669 (58.4%)**	Stephen Hammond 16,902 (31.2%)	William Powell 4,040 (7.4%)	Roland Mole 917 (1.7%)	Christopher Cooke (UKIP) 533 (1.0%) Ian Moorecroft (Berties Party) 178 (0.3%)	Mike O'Brien
Nuneaton	**Bill Olner** **30,080 (56.2%)**	Richard Blunt 16,540 (30.9%)	Ron Cockings 4,732 (8.8%)	Roy English 1,533 (2.9%)	David Bray (Independent) 390 (0.7%) Peter Everitt (UKIP) 238 (0.5%)	Bill Olner
Rugby and Kenilworth	**Andy King** **26,356 (43.0%)**	Jim Pawsey 25,861 (42.2%)	Jeremy Roodhouse 8,737 (14.3%)		Michael Twite (NLP) 251 (0.4%)	Jim Pawsey
Stratford-on-Avon	Stewart Stacey 12,754 (20.5%)	**John Maples** **29,967 (48.3%)**	Susan Juned 15,861 (25.5%)	Adrian K Hilton 2,064 (3.3%)	JEM Spilsbury (UKIP) 556 (0.9%) James Brewster (NLP) 307 (0.5%) Simon G Marcus (Stratford First Democratic Conservative) 306 (0.5%) Sarah A Miller (PLA) 284 (0.5%)	Alan Howarth‡ (stood for Labour in Newport East)
Warwick and Leamington	**James Plaskitt** **26,747 (44.5%)**	Dudley Smith 23,349 (38.9%)	Nigel Hicks 7,133 (11.9%)	Val Davis 1,484 (2.5%)	Paul Baptie (Green) 764 (1.3%) Greville Warwick (Independent) 306 (0.5%) Michael Gibbs (Independent) 183 (0.3%) Roddy McCarthy (NLP) 125 (0.2%)	Dudley Smith

==== West Midlands ====
The county of the West Midlands elected 29 Members of Parliament in 29 seats – 28 borough constituencies and 1 county constituency; Meriden.

===== City of Birmingham =====
The City of Birmingham elected 11 Members of Parliament in 11 seats – 11 borough constituencies.

Constituency	Candidates					Incumbent
Constituency	Labour	Conservative	Liberal Democrat	Referendum	Other	Incumbent
Birmingham, Edgbaston	**Gisela Stuart** **23,554 (48.6%)**	Andrew Marshall 18,712 (38.6%)	James Gallagher 4,691 (9.7%)	Jonathan Oakton 1,065 (2.2%)	Derek Campbell (British Democratic Party) 443 (0.9%)	Jill Knight†
Birmingham, Erdington	**Robin Corbett** **23,764 (58.8%)**	Anthony Tomkins 11,107 (27.5%)	Ian Garrett 4,112 (10.2%)	Geoff Cable 1,424 (3.5%)		Robin Corbett
Birmingham, Hall Green	**Steve McCabe** **22,372 (53.5%)**	Andrew Hargreaves 13,952 (33.4%)	Alastair Dow 4,034 (9.6%)	Paul Bennett 1,461 (3.5%)		Andrew Hargreaves
Birmingham, Hodge Hill	**Terry Davis** **22,398 (65.6%)**	Edward Grant 8,198 (24.9%)	Hadyn Thomas 2,891 (8.5%)		Peter Johnson (UKIP) 660 (1.9%)	Terry Davis
Birmingham, Ladywood	**Clare Short** **28,134 (74.1%)**	Shailesh Vara 5,052 (13.3%)	Sardul Singh Marwa 3,020 (8.0%)	Ruth A. Gurney 1,086 (2.9%)	Andrew Carmichael (ND) 685 (1.8%)	Clare Short
Birmingham, Northfield	**Richard Burden** **22,316 (57.4%)**	Alan C. Blumenthal 10,873 (28.0%)	Michael R. Ashell 4,078 (10.5%)	David Gent 1,243 (3.2%)	Keith A. Axon (BNP) 337 (0.9%)	Richard Burden
Birmingham, Perry Barr	**Jeff Rooker** **28,921 (63.0%)**	Andrew Dunnett 9,964 (21.7%)	Raymond Hassall 4,523 (9.9%)	Saeed Mahmood 843 (1.8%)	William Baxter (Liberal) 718 (1.6%) Lee Windridge (BNP) 544 (1.2%) Avtar Singh Panesar (Independent) 374 (0.8%)	Jeff Rooker
Birmingham, Selly Oak	**Lynne Jones** **28,121 (55.6%)**	Graham Greene 14,033 (27.8%)	David Osborne 6,121 (12.1%)	Laurence Marshall 1,520 (3.0%)	Greg Gardner (PLA) 417 (0.8%) Peter Sheriff-Knowles (OMRLP) 253 (0.5%) Huw Meads (NLP) 85 (0.5%)	Lynne Jones
Birmingham, Sparkbrook and Small Heath	**Roger Godsiff** **26,841 (64.3%)**	Kenneth Hardeman 7,315 (17.5%)	Roger Harmer 3,889 (9.3%)	Riaz Dooley 737 (1.8%)	Alan Clawley (Green) 959 (2.3%) Pankaj Patel (Independent) 538 (1.3%) Rashid Syed (Independent) 513 (1.2%) Sajada Bi (Independent) 490 (1.2%) Colin Wren (SLP) 483 (1.2%)	Roger Godsiff‡ (Birmingham Small Heath)
Birmingham, Sparkbrook and Small Heath	**Roger Godsiff** **26,841 (64.3%)**	Kenneth Hardeman 7,315 (17.5%)	Roger Harmer 3,889 (9.3%)	Riaz Dooley 737 (1.8%)	Alan Clawley (Green) 959 (2.3%) Pankaj Patel (Independent) 538 (1.3%) Rashid Syed (Independent) 513 (1.2%) Sajada Bi (Independent) 490 (1.2%) Colin Wren (SLP) 483 (1.2%)	Roy Hattersley† (Birmingham Sparkbrook)
Birmingham, Yardley	**Estelle Morris** **17,778 (47.0%)**	Anne Jobson 6,736 (17.8%)	John Hemming 12,463 (33.0%)	Duncan Livingston 646 (1.7%)	Alan Ware (UKIP) 164 (0.4%)	Estelle Morris
Sutton Coldfield	Alan C. York 12,488 (23.8%)	**Norman Fowler** **27,373 (52.2%)**	James E. Whorwood 10,139 (19.4%)	Douglas Hope 2,401 (4.6%)		Norman Fowler

===== Coventry and Solihull =====
The city of Coventry and the Metropolitan Borough of Solihull elected 5 Members of Parliament in 5 seats – 4 borough constituencies and 1 county constituency; Meriden.

Constituency	Candidates					Incumbent
Constituency	Labour	Conservative	Liberal Democrat	Referendum	Other	Incumbent
Coventry North East	**Bob Ainsworth** **31,856 (66.3%)**	Michael Burnett 9,287 (19.3%)	Geoffrey Sewards 3,866 (8.9%)	Ron Hurrell 1,125 (2.3%)	Nick Brown (Liberal) 1,181 (2.5%) Hanna Khamis (SLP) 597 (1.2%) Christopher Sidwell (RDT) 173 (0.4%)	Bob Ainsworth
Coventry North West	**Geoffrey Robinson** **30,901 (56.86%)**	Paul Bartlett 14,300 (26.33%)	Napier Penlington 5,690 (10.48%)	Douglas Butler 1,269 (2.34%)	Dave Spencer (SLP) 940 (1.73%) Rob Wheway (Liberal) 687 (1.27%) Paul Mills (PLA) 359 (0.66%) Leslie Francis (RDT) 176 (0.32%)	Geoffrey Robinson
Coventry South	**Jim Cunningham** **25,511 (50.9%)**	Paul Ivey 14,558 (29.0%)	Gordon MacDonald 4,617 (9.2%)	Paul Garratt 943 (1.9%)	Dave Nellist (SP) 3,262 (6.5%) Roger Jenking (Liberal) 725 (1.4%) Jeffrey Ashberry (BNP) 328 (0.7%) Anne−Marie Bradshaw (RDT) 180 (0.4%)	Jim Cunningham‡ (Coventry South East)
Meriden	Brian Seymour-Smith 22,415 (41.0%)	**Caroline Spelman** **22,997 (42.0%)**	Tony Dupont 7,098 (13.0%)	Paul Gilbert 2,208 (4.0%)		Iain Mills (died in office)
Solihull	Rachel N. Harris 14,334 (24.3%)	**John Taylor** **26,299 (44.6%)**	Michael J. Southcombe 14,902 (25.3%))	Mike Nattrass 2,748 (4.7%)	Jim Caffery (PLA) 623 (1.1%)	John Taylor

===== Dudley and Sandwell =====
The Metropolitan Borough of Dudley and Sandwell elected 7 Members of Parliament in 7 seats.

Constituency	Candidates					Incumbent
Constituency	Labour	Conservative	Liberal Democrat	Referendum	Other	Incumbent
Dudley North	**Ross Cranston** **24,471 (51.2%)**	Charles MacNamara 15,014 (31.4%)	Gerry Lewis 3,939 (8.2%)	Stuart Bavester 1,201 (2.5%)	Mark Atherton (SLP) 2,155 (4.5%) George Cartwright (NF) 559 (1.2%) Simon Darby (ND) 469 (1.0%)	John Gilbert† (Dudley East)
Dudley South	**Ian Pearson** **27,124 (56.6%)**	Mark Simpson 14,097 (29.4%)	Richard Burt 5,214 (10.9%)	Connor Birch 1,467 (3.1%)		Ian Pearson‡ (Dudley West)
Halesowen and Rowley Regis	**Sylvia Heal** **26,366 (54.1%)**	John Kennedy 16,029 (32.9%)	Elaine Todd 4,169 (8.5%)	Alan White 1,244 (2.5%)	Karen Meads (ND) 592 (1.2%) Tim Weller (Green) 361 (0.7%)	John Spellar‡ (Warley West)
Stourbridge	**Debra Shipley** **23,452 (47.2%)**	Warren Hawksley 17,807 (35.8%)	Chris Bramall 7,123 (14.3%)	Peter Quick 1,319 (2.7%)		Warren Hawksley‡ (Halesowen and Stourbridge)
Warley	**John Spellar** **24,813 (63.8%)**	Christopher Pincher 9,362 (24.1%)	Jeremy Pursehouse 3,777 (9.7%)	Krishna Gamre 941 (2.4%)		Andrew Faulds† (Warley East)
West Bromwich East	**Peter Snape** **23,710 (57.2%)**	Brian Matsell 10,126 (22.4%)	Martyn G. Smith 6,179 (14.9%)	Graham Mulley 1,472 (3.5%)		Peter Snape
West Bromwich West					**Betty Boothroyd (Speaker)** **23,969 (65.3%)** Richard Silvester (Ind. Lab.) 8,546 (22.3%) Steven Edwards (ND) 4,181 (11.4%)	**Betty Boothroyd**

===== Walsall and Wolverhampton =====
The Metropolitan Borough of Walsall and city of Wolverhampton elected 6 Members of Parliament in 6 seats.

Constituency	Candidates					Incumbent
Constituency	Labour	Conservative	Liberal Democrat	Referendum	Other	Incumbent
Aldridge-Brownhills	Janos Toth 19,330 (41.7%)	**Richard Shepherd** **21,856 (47.1%)**	Celia M. Downie 5,184 (11.2%)			Richard Shepherd
Walsall North	**David Winnick** **24,517 (56.6%)**	Michael Bird 11,929 (27.6%)	Tracy O'Brien 4,050 (9.4%)	Derek Bennett 1,430 (3.3%)	Melvin Pitt (Ind.) 911 (2.1%) Alan Humphries (NF) 465 (1.1%)	David Winnick
Walsall South	**Bruce George** **25,024 (57.9%)**	Leslie Leek 13,712 (31.7%)	Harry Harris 2,698 (6.2%)	Thomas Dent 1,662 (3.8%)	Linda Meads (NLP) 149 (0.4%)	Bruce George
Wolverhampton North East	**Ken Purchase** **24,534 (59.2%)**	David Harvey 11,547 (27.9%)	Brian Niblett 2,214 (5.3%)	Andrew Muchall 1,192 (2.9%)	Andrew Muchall (Liberal) 1,192 (3.8%) Martin Wingfield (ND) 356 (0.9%)	Ken Purchase
Wolverhampton South East	**Dennis Turner** **22,202 (63.7%)**	William E. Hanbury 7,020 (20.2%)	Richard Whitehouse 3,292 (9.4%)	Trevor Stevenson-Platt 980 (2.8%)	Nick Worth (SLP) 689 (2.0%) Kenneth Bullman (Liberal) 647 (1.9%)	Dennis Turner
Wolverhampton South West	**Jenny Jones** **24,657 (50.4%)**	Nicholas Budgen 19,539 (39.9%)	Matthew Green 4,012 (8.2%)		Mike Hyde (Liberal) 713 (1.5%)	Nicholas Budgen

==== Worcestershire ====
Worcestershire elected 6 Members of Parliament in 6 seats – 2 borough constituencies and 4 county constituencies.

Constituency	Candidates					Incumbent
Constituency	Conservative	Labour	Liberal Democrat	Referendum	Other	Incumbent
Bromsgrove	**Julie Kirkbride** **24,620 (47.2%)**	Peter McDonald 19,725 (37.8%)	Jennette Davy 6,200 (11.9%)	Diana Winsor 1,411 (2.7%)	Beatrice Wetton (UKIP) 251 (0.5%)	Roy Thomason†
Mid Worcestershire	**Peter Luff** **24,092 (47.4%)**	Diane Smith 14,680 (28.9%)	David Barwick 9,458 (18.6%)	Terence Watson 1,780 (3.5%)	David Ingles (UKIP) 646 (1.3%) Alan Dyer (NLP) 163 (0.3%)	Eric Forth‡
Redditch	Anthea McIntyre 16,155 (36.1%)	**Jacqui Smith** **22,280 (49.8%)**	Malcolm Hall 4,935 (11.0%)	Richard Cox 1,151 (3.4%)	Paul Davis (NLP) 227 (0.5%)	New constituency
West Worcestershire	**Michael Spicer** **22,223 (45.0%)**	Neil Stone 7,738 (15.7%)	Michael Hadley 18,377 (37.2%)		Sue Cameron (Green) 1,006 (2.0%)	Michael Spicer‡ (South Worcestershire)
Worcester	Nick Bourne 18,423 (25.7%)	**Michael Foster** **25,848 (50.1%)**	Paul Chandler 6,462 (12.5%)		P. Wood (UKIP) 886 (1.7%)	Peter Luff‡
Wyre Forest	Anthony Coombs 19,897 (36.1%)	**David Lock** **26,843 (48.8%)**	David Cropp 4,377 (8.0%)	William Till 1,956 (3.6%)	Chris Harvey (Liberal) 1,670 (3.0%) Jim Millington (UKIP) 312 (0.6%%)	Anthony Coombs

=== Yorkshire and the Humber ===
Yorkshire and the Humber elected 56 Members of Parliament across 4 counties; Humberside (East Riding of Yorkshire), North Yorkshire, South Yorkshire and West Yorkshire.

==== Humberside ====
Humberside elected 10 Members of Parliament in 10 seats – 4 borough constituencies and 6 county constituencies.

Constituency	Candidates					Incumbent
Constituency	Labour	Conservative	Liberal Democrat	Referendum	Other	Incumbent
Beverley and Holderness	Norman O'Neill 20,418 (38.9%)	**James Cran** **21,629 (41.2%)**	John Melling 9,689 (18.4%)		David Barley (UKIP) 695 (1.3%) Stewart Withers (NLP) 111 (0.2%)	James Cran‡ (Beverley)
Brigg and Goole	**Ian Cawsey** **23,493 (50.2%)**	Donald M. Stewart 17,104 (36.5%)	Mary-Rose Hardy 4,692 (10.0%)	Derek M. Rigby 1,513 (3.2%)		Michael Brown‡ (Brigg and Cleethorpes)
Cleethorpes	**Shona McIsaac** **26,058 (51.6%)**	Michael Brown 16,882 (33.4%)	Keith Melton 5,746 (11.4%)	John Berry 894 (3.5%)		Michael Brown‡ (Brigg and Cleethorpes)
East Yorkshire	Ian Male 17,567 (35.9%)	**John Townend** **20,904 (42.7%)**	David Leadley 9,070 (18.5%)		Raymond Allerston (SDP) 1,049 (2.1%) Michael Cooper (ND) 381 (0.8%)	John Townend‡ (Bridlington)
Great Grimsby	**Austin Mitchell** **25,765 (59.8%)**	Dean Godson 9,521 (22.1%)	Andrew De Freitas 7,810 (18.1%)			Austin Mitchell
Haltemprice and Howden	George McManus 11,701 (23.6%)	**David Davis** **21,809 (44.0%)**	Diana Wallis 14,295 (28.8%)	Trevor Pearson 1,370 (2.8%)	Godfrey Bloom (UKIP) 301 (0.6%) Barry Stevens (NLP) 74 (0.1%)	David Davis‡ (Boothferry)
Kingston upon Hull East	**John Prescott** **28,870 (71.3%)**	Angus West 5,552 (13.7%)	Jim Wastling 3,965 (9.8%)	Gordon Rogers 1,788 (4.4%)	Margaret Nolan (PLA) 190 (0.5%) David Whitley (NLP) 121 (0.3%)	John Prescott
Kingston upon Hull North	**Kevin McNamara** **25,542 (65.8%)**	David Lee 5,837 (15.1%)	David Nolan 5,667 (14.6%)	Norman Scott 1,533 (4.0%)	Terry Brotheridge (NLP) 214 (0.6%)	Kevin McNamara
Kingston upon Hull West and Hessle	**Alan Johnson** **22,520 (58.7%)**	Cormach Moore 6,933 (18.1%)	Bob Tress 6,995 (18.2%)	Richard Bate 1,596 (4.2%)	Barry Franklin (NLP) 310 (0.8%)	Stuart Randall† (Kingston upon Hull West)
Scunthorpe	**Elliot Morley** **25,107 (60.4%)**	Martyn Fisher 10,934 (26.3%)	Gordon Smith 3,497 (8.4%)	Paul Smith 1,637 (3.9%)	Brian Hopper (SLP) 399 (1.0%)	Elliot Morley‡ (Glanford and Scunthorpe)

==== North Yorkshire ====
North Yorkshire elected 8 Members of Parliament in 8 seats – 2 borough constituencies and 6 county constituencies.

Constituency	Candidates					Incumbent
Constituency	Conservative	Labour	Liberal Democrat	Referendum	Other	Incumbent
City of York	Simon Mallett 14,433 (24.7%)	**Hugh Bayley** **34,956 (59.9%)**	Andrew Waller 6,537 (11.2%)	Jonathan Sheppard 1,083 (1.9%)	Mark Hill (Green) 880 (1.5%) Eric Wegener (UKIP) 319 (0.6%) Andrew Lightfoot (Ind.) 137 (0.2%)	Hugh Bayley
Harrogate and Knaresborough	Norman Lamont 18,322 (38.5%)	Barbara Boyce 4,151 (8.7%)	**Phil Willis** **24,558 (51.5%)**		John Blackburn (Loyal Conservative) 614 (1.3%)	Norman Lamont
Richmond (Yorks)	**William Hague** **23,326 (48.9%)**	Steven Merritt 13,275 (27.8%)	Jane Harvey 8,773 (18.4%)	Alex Bentley 2,367 (5.0%)		William Hague
Ryedale	**John Greenway** **21,351 (43.8%)**	Alison M. Hiles 8,762 (18.0%)	Keith Orrell 16,293 (33.4%)	John E. Mackfall 1,460 (3.0%)	Stephen Feaster (UKIP) 917 (1.9%)	John Greenway
Scarborough and Whitby	John Sykes 19,667 (36.2%)	**Lawrie Quinn** **24,791 (45.6%)**	Martin Allinson 7,672 (14.1%)	Shelagh Murray 2,191 (4.0%)		John Sykes (Scarborough)
Selby	Ken Hind 22,002 (39.1%)	**John Grogan** **25,838 (45.9%)**	A. Edward Batty 6,778 (12.0%)	David Walker 1,162 (2.1%)	P. Spence (UKIP) 536 (1.0%)	Michael Alison†
Skipton and Ripon	**David Curry** **25,294 (46.5%)**	Robert Marchant 12,171 (22.4%)	Thomas Mould 13,674 (25.2%)	Nancy Holdsworth 3,212 (5.9%)		David Curry
Vale of York	**Anne McIntosh** **23,815 (44.7%)**	Matt Carter 14,094 (26.5%)	Charles Hall 12,656 (23.8%)	Clive Fairclough 2,503 (4.7%)	Tony Pelton (SDP) 197 (0.4%)	New constituency

==== South Yorkshire ====
South Yorkshire elected 15 Members of Parliament in 15 seats – 7 borough constituencies and 8 county constituencies.

Constituency	Candidates					Incumbent
Constituency	Labour	Conservative	Liberal Democrat	Referendum	Other	Incumbent
Barnsley Central	**Eric Illsley** **28,090 (77.0%)**	Simon Gutteridge 3,589 (9.8%)	Darren Finlay 3,481 (9.5%)	James Walsh 1,325 (3.6%)		Eric Illsley
Barnsley East and Mexborough	**Jeffery Ennis** **31,699 (73.1%)**	Jane Ellison 4,936 (11.4%)	David G. Willis 4,489 (10.4%)	Arthur J. Miles 797 (1.8%)	Ken Capstick (SLP) 1,213 (2.8%) Julie E. Hyland (Ind.) 201 (0.5%)	Jeffery Ennis‡ (Barnsley East)
Barnsley West and Penistone	**Michael Clapham** **25,017 (59.3%)**	Paul Watkins 7,750 (18.4%)	Winifred Knight 7,613 (18.0%)	Joyce Miles 1,828 (4.3%)		Michael Clapham
Doncaster Central	**Rosie Winterton** **26,961 (62.1%)**	David Turtle 9,105 (21.0%)	Simon Tarry 4,091 (9.4%)	Michael Cliff 1,273 (2.9%)	Michael Kenny (SLP) 854 (2.0%) Jonathan Redden (PLA) 694 (1.6%) Peter Davies (UKIP) 462 (1.1%)	Harold Walker†
Doncaster North	**Kevin Hughes** **27,843 (69.8%)**	Peter Kennerley 5,906 (14.8%)	Michael Cook 3,369 (8.4%)	Ron Thornton 1,589 (4.0%)	Neil Swan (Anti Sleaze Labour) 1,181 (3.0%)	Kevin Hughes
Don Valley	**Caroline Flint** **25,376 (58.3%)**	Clare H. Gledhill 10,717 (24.6%)	Paul Johnston 4,238 (9.7%)	Paul R. Davis 1,379 (3.2%)	Nigel Ball (SLP) 1,024 (2.4%) Stephen Platt (Green) 493 (1.1%) Claire D. Johnson (PLA) 330 (0.8%)	Martin Redmond†
Rother Valley	**Kevin Barron** **31,184 (67.6%)**	Steven Stanbury 7,699 (16.7%)	Stan Burgess 5,342 (11.6%)	Stephen Cook 1,932 (4.2%)		Kevin Barron
Rotherham	**Denis MacShane** **26,852 (71.3%)**	Simon Gordon 5,383 (14.3%)	David B. Wildgoose 3,919 (10.4%)	Ray T. Hollebone 1,132 (3.0%)	Andrew Neal (PLA) 364 (1.0%)	Denis MacShane
Sheffield, Attercliffe	**Clive Betts** **28,937 (65.3%)**	Brendan Doyle 7,119 (16.1%)	Gail Smith 6,973 (5.7%)	James Brown 1,289 (2.9%)		Clive Betts
Sheffield, Brightside	**David Blunkett** **24,901 (73.5%)**	Christopher Buckwell 2,850 (8.4%)	Francis Butler 4,947 (14.6%)	Brian Farnsworth 624 (1.8%)	Paul Davidson (SLP) 482 (1.4%) Richard Scott (NLP) 61 (0.2%)	David Blunkett
Sheffield Central	**Richard Caborn** **23,179 (63.6%)**	Martin Hess 4,341 (11.9%)	Ali Qadar 6,273 (17.2%)	Anthony Brownlow 863 (2.4%)	Andy D'Agorne (Green) 954 (2.6%) Ken Douglas (SP) 466 (1.3%) Maureen Aitken (PLA) 280 (0.8%) Michael Driver (WRP) 63 (0.2%)	Richard Caborn
Sheffield, Hallam	Stephen G. Conquest 6,147 (13.5%)	Irvine Patnick 15,074 (33.1%)	**Richard Allan** **23,345 (51.3%)**	Ian S. Davidson 788 (1.7%)	Philip Booler (Ind.) 125 (0.3%)	Irvine Patnick
Sheffield, Heeley	**Bill Michie** **26,274 (60.7%)**	John Harthman 6,767 (15.6%)	Roger Davison 9,196 (21.3%)	David Mawson 1,029 (2.4%)		Bill Michie
Sheffield, Hillsborough	**Helen Jackson** **30,150 (56.9%)**	David Nuttall 7,707 (14.5%)	Arthur Dunworth 13,699 (25.8%)	John Rusling 1,468 (2.8%)		Helen Jackson
Wentworth	**John Healey** **30,225 (72.3%)**	Karl Hamer 6,266 (15.0%)	James Charters 3,867 (9.3%)	Andrew Battley 1,423 (3.4%)		Peter Hardy†

==== West Yorkshire ====
West Yorkshire elected 23 Members of Parliament in 23 seats – 13 borough constituencies and 10 county constituencies.

===== Leeds and Wakefield =====
Constituency	Candidates					Incumbent
Constituency	Labour	Conservative	Liberal Democrat	Referendum	Other	Incumbent
Elmet	**Colin Burgon** **28,348 (52.4%)**	Spencer Batiste 19,569 (36.2%)	Brian Jennings 4,691 (8.7%)	Christopher Zawadski 1,487 (2.7%)		Spencer Batiste
Hemsworth	**Jon Trickett** **32,088 (70.6%)**	Norman Hazell 8,096 (17.8%)	Jacqueline Kirby 4,033 (8.9%)	Derek Irvine 1,260 (2.8%)		Jon Trickett
Leeds Central	**Derek Fatchett** **25,766 (69.6%)**	Edward Wild 5,077 (13.7%)	David Freeman 4,164 (11.3%)	Philip Myers 1,042 (2.8%)	Mick Rix (SLP) 656 (1.8%) Chris Hill (SP) 304 (0.8%)	Derek Fatchett
Leeds East	**George Mudie** **24,151 (67.5%)**	John Emsley 6,685 (18.7%)	Madeleine Kirk 3,689 (10.3%)	Leon Parrish 1,267 (3.5%)		George Mudie
Leeds North East	**Fabian Hamilton** **22,368 (49.2%)**	Timothy Kirkhope 15,409 (33.9%)	William Winlow 6,318 (13.9%)	Ian Rose 946 (2.1%)	Jan Egan (SLP) 468 (1.0%)	Timothy Kirkhope
Leeds North West	**Harold Best** **19,694 (39.9%)**	Keith Hampson 15,850 (32.1%)	Barbara Pearce 11,689 (23.7%)	Sean Emmett 1,325 (2.7%)	Roger Lamb (SLP) 335 (0.7%) Robert Toome (PLA) 251 (0.5%) Daniel Duffy (RtR) 232 (0.5%)	Keith Hampson
Leeds West	**John Battle** **26,819 (66.7%)**	John Whelan 7,048 (17.5%)	Nigel Amor 3,622 (9.0%)	Bill Finley 1,210 (3.0%)	David Blackburn (Green) 896 (2.2%) Noel Nowosielski (Liberal) 625 (1.6%)	John Battle
Morley and Rothwell	**John Gunnell** **26,836 (58.5%)**	Alan Barraclough 12,086 (26.3%)	Mitchell Galdas 5,087 (11.1%)	David Mitchell-Innes 1,359 (3.0%)	Roger Wood (BNP) 381 (0.8%) Pat Sammon (PLA) 148 (0.5%)	John Gunnell‡ (Morley and Leeds South)
Normanton	**Bill O'Brien** **26,046 (60.6%)**	Fiona Bulmer 10,153 (23.6%)	David Ridgway 5,347 (12.4%)	Ken Shuttleworth 1,458 (3.4%)		Bill O'Brien
Pontefract and Castleford	**Yvette Cooper** **31,339 (75.7%)**	Adrian Flook 5,614 (13.6%)	Wesley Paxton 3,042 (7.4%)	Richard Wood 1,401 (3.4%)		Geoffrey Lofthouse†
Pudsey	**Paul Truswell** **25,370 (48.1%)**	Peter Bone 19,163 (36.3%)	Jonathan Brown 7,375 (14.0%)	David Crabtree 823 (1.6%)		Giles Shaw†
Wakefield	**David Hinchliffe** **28,977 (57.4%)**	Jonathan Peacock 14,373 (28.5%)	Douglas Dale 5,656 (11.2%)	Simon Shires 1,480 (2.9%)		David Hinchliffe

===== Bradford, Calderdale and Kirklees =====
Constituency	Candidates					Incumbent
Constituency	Labour	Conservative	Liberal Democrat	Referendum	Other	Incumbent
Batley and Spen	**Mike Wood** **23,213 (49.4%)**	Elizabeth Peacock 17,072 (36.4%)	Kathryn Pinnock 4,133 (8.8%)	Ed O.C. Wood 1,691 (3.6%)	Ron Smith (BNP) 472 (1.0%) Clive Lord (Green) 384 (0.8%)	Elizabeth Peacock
Bradford North	**Terry Rooney** **23,493 (56.1%)**	Rasjid Skinner 10,723 (25.6%)	Terry Browne 6,083 (14.5%)	Harry Wheatley 1,227 (2.9%)	Wild Willi Beckett (OMRLP) 369 (0.9%)	Terry Rooney
Bradford South	**Gerry Sutcliffe** **25,558 (56.7%)**	Ann G. Hawkesworth 12,622 (28.0%)	Alexander Wilson-Fletcher 5,093 (11.3%)	Marilyn Kershaw 1,785 (4.0%)		Gerry Sutcliffe
Bradford West	**Marsha Singh** **18,932 (41.6%)**	Mohammed Riaz 15,055 (33.0%)	Helen Wright 6,737 (14.8%)	Christopher Royston 1,348 (3.0%)	Abdul R. Khan (SLP) 1,551 (3.4%) John Robinson (Green) 861 (1.9%) Gary Osborn (BNP) 839 (1.8%) Sajjad Shah (SP) 245 (0.5%)	Max Madden†
Calder Valley	**Christine McCafferty** **26,050 (46.1%)**	Donald Thompson 19,795 (35.1%)	Stephen Pearson 8,322 (14.7%)	Anthony Mellor 1,380 (2.4%)	Vivienne Smith (Green) 488 (0.9%) Christian Jackson (BNP) 431 (0.8%)	Donald Thompson
Colne Valley	**Kali Mountford** **23,285 (41.3%)**	Graham Riddick 18,445 (32.7%)	Nigel Priestley 12,755 (22.6%)		Alan J. Brooke (SLP) 759 (1.3%) Andy V. Cooper (Green) 493 (0.9%) J.D. Nunn (UKIP) 478 (0.8%) Melody Staniforth (OMRLP) 196 (0.3%)	Graham Riddick
Dewsbury	**Ann Taylor** **21,286 (49.4%)**	Paul McCormick 12,963 (30.1%)	Kingsley Hill 4,422 (10.3%)	Wendy Golf 1,019 (2.4%)	Frances Taylor (BNP) 2,232 (5.2%) David Daniel (Ind Lab.) 770 (1.8%) Ian McCourtie (Green) 383 (0.9%)	Ann Taylor
Halifax	**Alice Mahon** **27,465 (54.3%)**	Robert Light 16,253 (32.1%)	Edgar Waller 6,059 (12.0%)		Constance Whittaker (UKIP) 779 (1.5%)	Alice Mahon
Huddersfield	**Barry Sheerman** **25,171 (56.5%)**	Bill Forrow 9,323 (20.9%)	Gordon Beever 7,642 (17.2%)	Paul McNulty 1,480 (3.3%)	John Phillips (Green) 938 (2.1%)	Barry Sheerman
Keighley	**Ann Cryer** **26,039 (50.6%)**	Gary Waller 18,907 (36.7%)	Mike Doyle 5,064 (9.8%)	Colin Carpenter 1,470 (2.9%)		Gary Waller
Shipley	**Chris Leslie** **22,962 (43.3%)**	Marcus Fox 19,996 (37.8%)	John Cole 7,984 (15.1%)	Stephen Ellams 1,960 (3.7%)		Marcus Fox

== Northern Ireland ==
Northern Ireland elected 18 Members of Parliament across the 6 counties of Northern Ireland.

== Scotland ==
Scotland elected 72 Members of Parliament across the 8 regions.

=== Central Scotland ===
Central Scotland elected 10 Members of Parliament.

Constituency	Candidates						Incumbent
Constituency	Labour	Conservative	Liberal Democrat	Scottish National Party	Referendum	Other	Incumbent
Airdrie and Shotts	**Helen Liddell** **25,460 (61.8%)**	Nicholas H. Brook 3,660 (8.9%)	Richard G. Wolseley 1,719 (4.2%)	Keith R.A. Robertson 10,048 (24.4%)	Crawford Semple 294 (0.7%)		Helen Liddell (Monklands East)
Coatbridge and Chryston	**Tom Clarke** **25,694 (68.3%)**	Andrew Wauchope 3,216 (8.6%)	Morag E. Daly 2,048 (5.4%)	Brian Nugent 6,402 (17.0%)	Bernard Bowsley 249 (0.7%)		Tom Clarke (Monklands West)
Cumbernauld and Kilsyth	**Rosemary McKenna** **21,141 (58.7%)**	Ian Sewell 2,441 (6.8%)	John S. Biggam 1,368 (3.8%)	Colin Barrie 10,013 (27.8%)	Pamela Cook 107 (0.3%)	Jan Cara (PLA) 609 (1.7%) Kenny McEwan (SSP) 345 (1.0%)	Norman Hogg†
East Kilbride	**Adam Ingram** **27,584 (56.5%)**	Clifford Herbertson 5,863 (12.0%)	Kate Philbrick 3,527 (7.2%)	George Gebbie 10,200 (20.9%)	Julie Gray 306 (0.6%)	John A. Deighan (PLA) 1,170 (2.4%) Ewan Gilmour (NLP) 146 (0.3%)	Adam Ingram
Falkirk East	**Michael Connarty** **23,344 (56.1%)**	Malcolm Nicol 5,813 (14.0%)	Rodger Spillane 2,153 (5.2%)	Keith Brown 9,959 (23.9%)	Sebastian Mowbray 325 (0.8%)		Michael Connarty
Falkirk West	**Dennis Canavan** **22,772 (59.3%)**	Carol Buchanan 4,639 (12.1%)	Derek Houston 1,970 (5.1%)	David Alexander 8,989 (23.4%)			Dennis Canavan
Hamilton North and Bellshill	**John Reid** **24,322 (64.0%)**	Gordon McIntosh 3,944 (10.4%)	Keith M. Legg 1,719 (5.1%)	Michael Matheson 7,255 (19.1%)	Ray P.D. Conn 554 (1.5%)		John Reid (Motherwell North)
Hamilton South	**George Robertson** **21,709 (65.6%)**	Robert Kilgour 2,858 (8.6%)	Richard Pitts 1,693 (5.1%)	Ian Black 5,831 (17.6%)	Stuart W. Brown 316 (1.0%)	Colin S. Gunn (PLA) 684 (2.1%)	George Robertson (Hamilton)
Kilmarnock and Loudoun	**Des Browne** **23,621 (49.8%)**	Douglas Taylor 5,125 (10.8%)	John Stewart 1,891 (4.0%)	Alex Neil 16,365 (34.5%)	William Sneddon 284 (0.6%)	William Gilmour (NLP) 123 (0.3%)	William McKelvey†
Motherwell and Wishaw	**Frank Roy** **21,020 (57.4%)**	Scott Dickson 4,024 (11.0%)	Alex G. Mackie 2,331 (6.4%)	James A. McGuigan 8,229 (22.5%)	Thomas Russell 218 (0.6%)	Christopher Herriot (SLP) 797 (2.2%)	Jeremy Bray† (Motherwell South)

=== Glasgow ===
Glasgow elected 10 Members of Parliament in 10 seats – all in borough constituencies.

Constituency	Candidates					Incumbent
Constituency	Labour	Scottish National Party	Liberal Democrat	Conservative	Other	Incumbent
Glasgow Anniesland	**Donald Dewar** **20,951 (61.8%)**	Bill Wilson 5,797 (17.1%)	Christopher McGinty 2,453 (7.2%)	Robert A. P. Brocklehurst 3,881 (11.5%)	Akhtar Majid (PLA) 374 (1.1%) Bill Bonnar (SSP) 229 (0.7%) Alan H. Milligan (UKIP) 86 (0.3%) Gillian McKay (Referendum) 84 (0.2%) Thomas J. Pringle (NLP) 24 (0.1%)	Donald Dewar (Glasgow Garscadden)
Glasgow Baillieston	**Jimmy Wray** **20,925 (65.7%)**	Patsy J. Thomson 6,085 (19.1%)	Sheila J. Rainger 1,217 (3.8%)	Malcolm G. Kelly 2,468 (7.7%)	Jim McVicar (SSP) 970 (3.0%) John McClafferty (Referendum) 188 (0.6%)	Jimmy Wray (Glasgow Provan)
Glasgow Cathcart	**John Maxton** **19,158 (57.4%)**	Maire Whitehead 6,913 (18.5%)	Callan Dick 2,302 (6.9%)	Alistair J. Muir 4,248 (12.%)	Zofia Indyk (PLA) 687 (2.0%) James Stevenson (SSP) 458 (1.3%) Strang Haldane (Referendum) 344 (1.0%)	John Maxton
Glasgow Govan	**Mohammad Sarwar** **14,216 (44.1%)**	Nicola Sturgeon 11,302 (35.1%)	Bob Stewart 1,918 (5.9%)	William Thomas 2,839 (8.8%)	Alan McCombes (SSP) 755 (2.3%) Peter Paton (Independent) 325 (1.0%) Islam Badar (Independent) 319 (1.0%) Zahid Abbasi (Independent) 221 (0.7%) Kenneth MacDonald (Referendum) 201 (0.7%) James White (BNP) 149 (0.5%)	Ian Davidson‡
Glasgow Kelvin	**George Galloway** **16,643 (51.0%)**	Sandra White 6,978 (21.4%)	Elspeth M. Buchanan 4,629 (14.2%)	Duncan H. McPhie 3,539 (10.8%)	Allan Green (SSP) 386 (1.2%) Robert J. M. Grigor (Referendum) 282 (0.9%) Victor Vanni (SPGB) 102 (0.3%) George W. Stidolph (NLP) 95 (0.3%)	George Galloway (Glasgow Hillhead)
Glasgow Maryhill	**Maria Fyfe** **19,301 (64.9%)**	John Wailes 5,037 (16.9%)	Elspeth Attwooll 2,119 (7.1%)	Stuart Baldwin 1,747 (5.9%)	Lorna Blair (NLP) 651 (2.2%) Mandy Baker (SSP) 409 (1.2%) Jahangir Hanif (PLA) 344 (1.2%) Roderick Paterson (Referendum) 77 (0.3%) Steve Johnstone (Independent) 36 (0.1%)	Maria Fyfe
Glasgow Pollok	**Ian Davidson** **19,653 (59.9%)**	David Logan 5,037 (17.9%)	David M. Jago 1,137 (3.5%)	Edwin S. Hamilton 1,979 (6.0%)	Tommy Sheridan (SSP) 3,639 (11.1%) Monica Gott (PLA) 380 (1.2%) Derek G. Haldane (Referendum) 152 (0.5%)	Jimmy Dunnachie†
Glasgow Rutherglen	**Tommy McAvoy** **20,430 (57.5%)**	Ian Gray 5,423 (15.3%)	Robert Brown 5,167 (14.6%)	David Campbell Bannerman 3,288 (9.3%)	George Easton (Ind. Lab.) 812 (2.3%) Rosie Kane (SSP) 251 (0.7%) Julia Kerr (Referendum) 150 (0.4%)	Tommy McAvoy
Glasgow Shettleston	**David Marshall** **19,616 (73.2%)**	Humayun Hanif 3,748 (14.0%)	Kerry Hiles 1,061 (4.0%)	Colin Simpson 1,484 (5.5%)	Christine McVicar (SSP) 482 (1.8%) Robert Currie (BNP) 191 (0.7%) Thomas Montguire (Referendum) 151 (0.6%) John Graham (WRP) 80 (0.3%)	David Marshall
Glasgow Springburn	**Michael Martin** **22,534 (71.4%)**	John R. Brady 5,208 (16.5%)	Jim Alexander 1,349 (4.3%)	Mark B. Holdsworth 1,893 (6.0%)	John Lawson (SSP) 407 (1.3%) Andrew J. Keating (Referendum) 186 (0.6%)	Michael Martin

=== Highlands and Islands ===
The Scottish Highlands and Islands elected 7 Members of Parliament.

Constituency	Candidates						Incumbent
Constituency	Labour	Scottish National Party	Liberal Democrat	Conservative	Referendum	Other	Incumbent
Argyll and Bute	Ali A. Syed 5,596 (15.7%)	Neil MacCormick 8,278 (23.2%)	**Ray Michie** **14,359 (40.2%)**	Ralph Leishman 6,774 (18.9%)	Michael Stewart 713 (1.0%)		Ray Michie
Caithness, Sutherland and Easter Ross	James Hendry 8,122 (27.8%)	Euan Harper 6,710 (23.0%)	**Robert Maclennan** **10,381 (35.6%)**	Tom Miers 3,148 (10.8%)	Carolyn Ryder 369 (1.3%)	John Martin (Green) 230 (0.8%) Martin Carr (UKIP) 212 (0.7%)	Robert Maclennan (Caithness and Sutherland)
Inverness East, Nairn and Lochaber	**David Stewart** **16,187 (33.9%)**	Fergus Ewing 13,848 (29.0%)	Stephen Gallagher 8,364 (17.5%)	Mary Scanlon 8,355 (17.5%)	Winnona Wall 436 (0.9%)	Murray Falconer (Green) 354 (0.7%) Daniel Hart (Ind.) 224 (0.5%)	Russell Johnston† (Inverness, Nairn and Lochaber)
Moray	Lewis Macdonald 7,886 (19.8%)	**Margaret Ewing** **16,529 (41.6%)**	Debra M. Storr 3,548 (8.9%)	Andrew J. Findlay 10,963 (27.6%)	Paddy Mieklejohn 840 (2.1%)		Margaret Ewing
Orkney and Shetland	James Paton 3,775 (18.3%)	Willie Ross 2,624 (12.7%)	**Jim Wallace** **10,743 (52.0%)**	Hope Anderson 2,527 (12.2%)	Francis Adamson 820 (4.0%)	Christian Wharton (NLP) 116 (0.6%) Arthur Robertson (Ind.) 60 (0.3%)	Jim Wallace
Ross, Skye and Inverness West	Donnie Munro 11,453 (28.7%)	Margaret Paterson 7,821 (19.6%)	**Charles Kennedy** **15,472 (38.7%)**	Mary MacLeod 4,368 (10.9%)	Les Durance 535 (1.3%)	Alan Hopkins (Green) 306 (0.8%)	Robert Maclennan (Ross, Cromarty and Skye)
Western Isles	**Calum MacDonald** **8,955 (55.6%)**	Anne Lorne Gillies 5,379 (33.4%)	Neil Mitchison 495 (3.1%)	Jamie McGrigor 1,071 (6.6%)	Ralph Lionel 206 (1.3%)		Calum MacDonald

=== Lothians ===
The Lothians elected 9 Members of Parliament.

Constituency	Candidates						Incumbent
Constituency	Labour	Scottish National Party	Liberal Democrat	Conservative	Referendum	Other	Incumbent
Edinburgh Central	**Alistair Darling** **20,125 (47.1%)**	Fiona Hyslop 6,750 (15.8%)	Karen J. Utting 5,605 (13.1%)	Mike D.A. Scott-Hayward 9,055 (21.2%)	Austin G. Skinner 495 (1.2%)	Linda Hendry (Green) 607 (1.4%) Mark E. Benson (Ind.) 98 (0.2%)	Alistair Darling
Edinburgh East and Musselburgh	**Gavin Strang** **22,564 (53.6%)**	Derrick White 8,034 (19.1%)	Callum I. MacKellar 4,511 (10.7%)	Kenneth F. Ward 6,483 (15.4%)	James A. Sibbet 526 (1.2%)		Gavin Strang‡ (Edinburgh East)
Edinburgh North and Leith	**Malcolm Chisholm** **19,209 (46.9%)**	Anne Dana 8,231 (20.1%)	Hillary Campbell 5,335 (13.0%)	Ewen Stewart 7,312 (17.9%)	Sandy Graham 441 (1.1%)	Gavin Browne (SSA) 320 (0.8%) Paul Douglas-Reid (NLP) 97 (0.2%)	Malcolm Chisholm‡ (Edinburgh Leith)
Edinburgh Pentlands	**Lynda Clark** **19,675 (43.0%)**	Stewart Gibb 5,952 (13.0%)	Jenny Dawe 4,575 (10.0%)	Malcolm Rifkind 14,813 (32.4%)	Malcolm McDonald 422 (0.9%)	Robin Harper (Green) 224 (0.5%) Alistair McConnachie (UKIP) 81 (0.2%)	Malcolm Rifkind
Edinburgh South	**Nigel Griffiths** **20,993 (48.8%)**	John Hargreaves 5,791 (12.9%)	Mike Pringle 7,911 (17.6%)	Liz Smith 9,541 (21.3%)	Ian McLean 504 (1.1%)	Bradley Dunn (NLP) 98 (0.2%)	Nigel Griffiths
Edinburgh West	Lesley Hinds 8,948 (18.8%)	Graham D. Sutherland 4,210 (8.8%)	**Donald Gorrie** **20,578 (43.2%)**	James Douglas-Hamilton 13,325 (28.0%)	Stephen C. Elphick 277 (0.6%)	Paul N. Coombes (Liberal) 263 (0.5%) Antony C.O. Jack (Ind.) 30 (0.1%)	James Douglas-Hamilton
Linlithgow	**Tam Dalyell** **21,469 (54.1%)**	Kenny MacAskill 10,631 (26.8%)	Andrew W. Duncan 3,796 (8.4%)	Tom Kerr 4,964 (12.5%)	Kenneth R. Plomer 259 (0.7%)		Tam Dalyell
Livingston	**Robin Cook** **23,510 (54.9%)**	Peter Johnston 11,763 (27.5%)	Ewan Hawthorn 2,876 (6.7%)	Hugh Halkett 4,028 (9.4%)	Helen Campbell 444 (1.0%)	Matt Culbert (SGB) 213 (0.5%)	Robin Cook
Midlothian	**Eric Clarke** **18,861 (53.5%)**	Lawrence Millar 8,991 (25.5%)	Richard F. Pinnock 3,235 (9.2%)	Anne C. Harper 3,842 (10.9%)	Keith K. Docking 320 (0.9%)		Eric Clarke

=== Mid Scotland and Fife ===
Mid Scotland and Fife elected 9 Members of Parliament.

Constituency	Candidates						Incumbent
Constituency	Labour	Scottish National Party	Conservative	Liberal Democrat	Referendum	Other	Incumbent
Central Fife	**Henry McLeish** **23,912 (58.7%)**	Tricia Marwick 10,199 (25.0%)	Jacob Rees-Mogg 3,669 (9.0%)	Ross Laird 2,610 (6.4%)	John Scrymgeour-Wedderburn 375 (0.9%)		Henry McLeish
Dunfermline East	**Gordon Brown** **24,441 (66.8%)**	John James Ramage 5,690 (15.6%)	Iain Grant Mitchell 3,656 (10.0%)	Jim Tolson 2,164 (5.9%)	Thomas Dunsmore 632 (1.7%)		Gordon Brown
Dunfermline West	**Rachel Squire** **19,338 (53.1%)**	John Lloyd 6,984 (19.2%)	Kevin Newton 4,606 (12.6%)	Elizabeth Harris 4,963 (13.6%)	James Bain 543 (1.5%)		Rachel Squire
Kirkcaldy	**Lewis Moonie** **18,730 (53.6%)**	Stewart Hosie 8,020 (22.9%)	Charlotte Black 4,779 (13.7%)	John Mainland 3,031 (8.7%)	Victor Baxter 413 (1.2%)		Lewis Moonie
North East Fife	Charles Milne 4,301 (10.3%)	Colin Welsh 4,545 (10.8%)	Adam Bruce 11,076 (26.5%)	**Menzies Campbell** **21,432 (51.2%)**	William Stewart 485 (1.2%)		Menzies Campbell
North Tayside	Ian McFatridge 5,141 (11.3%)	**John Swinney** **20,447 (44.8%)**	Bill Walker 16,287 (32.5%)	Peter Regent 3,716 (8.2%)			Bill Walker
Ochil	**Martin O'Neill** **19,707 (45.0%)**	George Reid 15,055 (34.4%)	Allan J.M. Hogarth 6,383 (14.6%)	Ann M. Watters 2,262 (5.2%)	Derek H.F. White 210 (0.5%)	Ian D. Macdonald (Oth.) (Note: Democratic Nationalist) 104 (0.2%) Mike S. Sullivan (NLP) 65 (0.1%)	Martin O'Neill‡ (Clackmannan)
Perth	Douglas Alexander 11,036 (24.8%)	**Roseanna Cunningham** **16,209 (36.4%)**	John Godfrey 13,068 (29.3%)	Chic Brodie 3,583 (8.0%)	Robert McAuley 366 (0.8%)	Matthew Henderson (UKIP) 289 (0.6%)	Roseanna Cunningham‡ (Perth and Kinross)
Stirling	**Anne McGuire** **20,382 (47.4%)**	Ewan Dow 5,752 (13.4%)	Michael Forsyth 13,971 (32.5%)	Alistair Tough 2,675 (6.2%)		William McMurdo (UKIP) 154 (0.4%)	Michael Forsyth

=== North East Scotland ===
North East Scotland including Aberdeenshire elected 9 Members of Parliament in 9 seats – 5 borough and 4 county constituencies.

Constituency	Candidates						Incumbent
Constituency	Labour	Conservative	Liberal Democrat	Scottish National Party	Referendum	Other	Incumbent
Aberdeen Central	**Frank Doran** **12,025 (45.5%)**	Stewart Norman Gunn Whyte 3,761 (14.2%)	Eleanor Anderson 4,547 (17.2%)	Wayne Gordon Gault 5,379 (20.4%)		Andy Cumbers (SSP) 717 (2.7%)	New constituency
Aberdeen North	**Malcolm Savidge** **18,839 (47.9%)**	James Gifford 5,763 (15.0%)	Mike Rumbles 5,421 (14.1%)	Brian Adam 8,379 (21.8%)	Alasdair McKenzie 463 (1.2%)		Robert Hughes†
Aberdeen South	**Anne Begg** **15,541 (35.3%)**	Raymond Robertson 11,621 (26.4%)	Nicol Stephen 12,176 (27.6%)	Jim Towers 4,299 (11.6%)	Ric Wharton 425 (1.0%)		Raymond Robertson
Angus	Catherine Taylor 6,733 (15.6%)	Sebastian A.A. Leslie 10,603 (24.6%)	Dick B. Speirs 4,065 (9.4%)	**Andrew Welsh** **20,792 (48.3%)**	Brian A. Taylor 883 (2.0%)		Andrew Welsh (East Angus)
Banff and Buchan	Megan Harris 4,747 (11.8%)	William Frain-Bell 9,564 (33.7%)	Neil Fletcher 2,398 (6.0%)	**Alex Salmond** **22,409 (55.8%)**	Alan Buchan 1,060 (2.6%)		Alex Salmond
Dundee East	**John McAllion** **20,718 (51.1%)**	Bruce Mackie 6,397 (15.8%)	Gurudeo Saluja 1,677 (4.1%)	Shona Robison 10,757 (26.5%)	Edward Galloway 601 (1.5%)	Harvey Duke (SSP) 232 (0.6%) Elisabeth Mackenzie (NLP) 146 (0.4%)	John McAllion
Dundee West	**Ernie Ross** **20,875 (53.8%)**	Neil Powrie 5,015 (13.2%)	Elizabeth Dick 2,972 (7.7%)	John Dorward 9,016 (23.2%)	John MacMillan 411 (1.1%)	Mary Ward (SSP) 428 (1.1%)	Ernie Ross
Gordon	Lindsey Kirkhill 4,350 (10.3%)	John Porter 11,002 (26.0%)	**Malcolm Bruce** **17,999 (42.6%)**	Richard Lochhead 8,435 (20.0%)	Fred Pidcock 459 (1.1%)		Malcolm Bruce
West Aberdeenshire and Kincardine	Qaisra Khan 3,923 (9.1%)	George Kynoch 15,080 (34.9%)	**Robert Smith** **17,999 (41.1%)**	Joy Mowatt 5,649 (13.1%)	Steve Ball 808 (1.9%)		George Kynoch (Kincardine and Deeside)

=== South Scotland ===
The South of Scotland elected 9 Members of Parliament.

Constituency	Candidates						Incumbent
Constituency	Labour	Conservative	Liberal Democrat	Scottish National Party	Referendum	Other	Incumbent
Ayr	**Sandra Osborne** **21,679 (48.4%)**	Phil Gallie 15,136 (33.8%)	Clare Hamblen 2,116 (4.7%)	Ian Blackford 5,625 (12.6%)	John Enos 200 (0.4%)		Phil Gallie
Carrick, Cumnock and Doon Valley	**George Foulkes** **29,398 (59.8%)**	Alistair J. Marshall 8,336 (17.0%)	Derek G. Young 2,613 (5.3%)	Christine Hutchison 8,190 (12.6%)	John K. Higgins 634 (1.3%)		George Foulkes
Clydesdale	**Jimmy Hood** **23,859 (52.5%)**	Mark Izatt 7,396 (16.3%)	Sandra Grieve 3,796 (8.4%)	Andrew Doig 10,050 (22.1)		Kenneth Smith (BNP) 311 (0.7%)	Jimmy Hood
Cunninghame South	**Brian Donohoe** **22,233 (62.7%)**	Pamela M. Paterson 3,571 (10.1%)	Erlend Watson 1,604 (4.5%)	Margaret Burgess 7,364 (20.8)	Allan Martlew 178 (0.5%)	Krishna Edwin (SLP) 494 (1.4%)	Brian Donohoe
Dumfries	**Russell Brown** **23,528 (47.5%)**	Struan Stevenson 13,885 (28.0%)	Neil C. Wallace 5,487 (11.1%)	Robert J. Higgins 5,977 (12.1)	David F. Parker 533 (1.1%)	Elizabeth Hunter (NLP) 117 (0.2%)	Hector Monro†
East Lothian	**John Home Robertson** **22,881 (52.7%)**	Murdo Fraser 8,660 (19.9%)	Alison MacAskill 4,575 (10.5%)	David R. McCarthy 6,825 (15.7)	Norman S. Nash 491 (1.1%)		John Home Robertson
Galloway and Upper Nithsdale	Katy Clark 6,861 (16.3%)	Ian Lang 12,825 (30.5%)	John McKerchar 2,700 (6.4%)	**Alasdair Morgan** **18,449 (43.9%)**	Alan Kennedy 428 (1.0%)	Robert Wood (Ind.) 556 (0.6%) Joseph Smith (UKIP) 189 (0.4%)	Ian Lang
Roxburgh and Berwickshire	Helen Eadie 5,226 (15.0%)	Douglas Younger 8,337 (23.9%)	**Archy Kirkwood** **16,243 (46.5%)**	Malcolm Balfour 3,959 (11.3%)	John Curtis 922 (2.6%)	Peter Neilson (UKIP) 202 (0.6%) David Lucas (NLP) 42 (0.1%)	Archy Kirkwood
Tweeddale, Ettrick and Lauderdale	Keith Geddes 10,689 (27.4%)	Alister Jack 8,623 (22.1%)	**Michael Moore** **12,178 (27.4%)**	Ian Goldie 6,671 (17.1%)	Christopher Mowbray 406 (1.0%)	John Hein (Liberal) 387 (1.0%) Duncan Paterson (NLP) 47 (0.1%)	David Steel†

=== West Scotland ===
The West of Scotland elected 9 Members of Parliament.

Constituency	Candidates						Incumbent
Constituency	Labour	Scottish National Party	Liberal Democrat	Conservative	Referendum	Other	Incumbent
Clydebank and Milngavie	**Tony Worthington** **21,583 (55.2%)**	Jim Yuill 8,263 (21.1%)	Keith W. Moody 4,086 (10.5%)	Nancy E. Morgan 4,885 (12.5%)	Ian Sanderson 269 (0.7%)		Tony Worthington
Cunninghame North	**Brian Wilson** **20,686 (50.3%)**	Kim Nicoll 7,584 (18.4%)	Karen Freel 2,271 (5.5%)	Janet Mitchell 9,647 (23.5%)	Ian Winton 440 (1.1%)	Louise McDaid (SLP) 501 (1.2%)	Brian Wilson
Dumbarton	**John McFall** **20,470 (49.6%)**	William McKechnie 9,587 (23.2%)	Alan Reid 3,144 (7.6%)	Peter Ramsay 7,283 (17.6%)	George Dempster 255 (0.6%)	Leslie Robertson (SSA) 283 (0.7%) Robert Lancaster (UKIP) 242 (0.6%)	John McFall
Eastwood	**Jim Murphy** **20,766 (39.7%)**	Douglas Arthur Yates 6,826 (13.1%)	Christopher Michael Mason 6,110 (11.7%)	Paul Cullen 17,530 (33.5%)	David Ian Miller 497 (1.0%)	Dr. Manar Tayan (PLA) 283 (0.7%) Douglas McPherson (UKIP) 130 (0.2%)	Allan Stewart†
Greenock and Inverclyde	**Norman Godman** **19,480 (56.2%)**	Brian J. Goodall 6,440 (18.6%)	Rod Ackland 4,791 (13.8%)	Hugo Swire 3,976 (11.5%)			Norman Godman‡ (Greenock and Port Glasgow)
Paisley North	**Irene Adams** **20,295 (59.5%)**	Ian Mackay 7,481 (21.9%)	Alan Jelfs 2,365 (6.9%)	Kenneth Brookes 3,267 (9.6%)	Edwin Mathew 196 (0.6%)	Robert Graham (PLA) 531 (1.6%)	Irene Adams
Paisley South	**Gordon McMaster** **21,482 (57.5%)**	William Martin 8,732 (23.4%)	Eileen McCartin 3,500 (9.4%)	Robin Reid 3,237 (8.6%)	James Lardner 254 (0.7%)	Sean Clerkin (SSP) 146 (0.4%)	Gordon McMaster
Strathkelvin and Bearsden	**Sam Galbraith** **26,278 (52.9%)**	Graeme McCormick 8,111 (16.3%)	John Morrison 4,843 (9.7%)	David Sharpe 9,986 (20.1%)	David Wilson 339 (0.7%)	Christine Fisher (NLP) 155 (0.3%)	Sam Galbraith
West Renfrewshire	**Tommy Graham** **19,525 (46.6%)**	Colin Campbell 10,546 (26.5%)	Bruce J.S. Macpherson 3,045 (7.7%)	Charles J.S. Cormack 7,387 (18.6%)	Shaw T. Lindsay 283 (0.7%)		Tommy Graham‡ (Renfrew West and Inverclyde)

== Wales ==
Wales elected 40 Members of Parliament.

== See also ==
- List of United Kingdom Parliament constituencies (1997–2024) by region
