= 1972 Labour Party deputy leadership election =

British political party election

- 20–25 April 1972

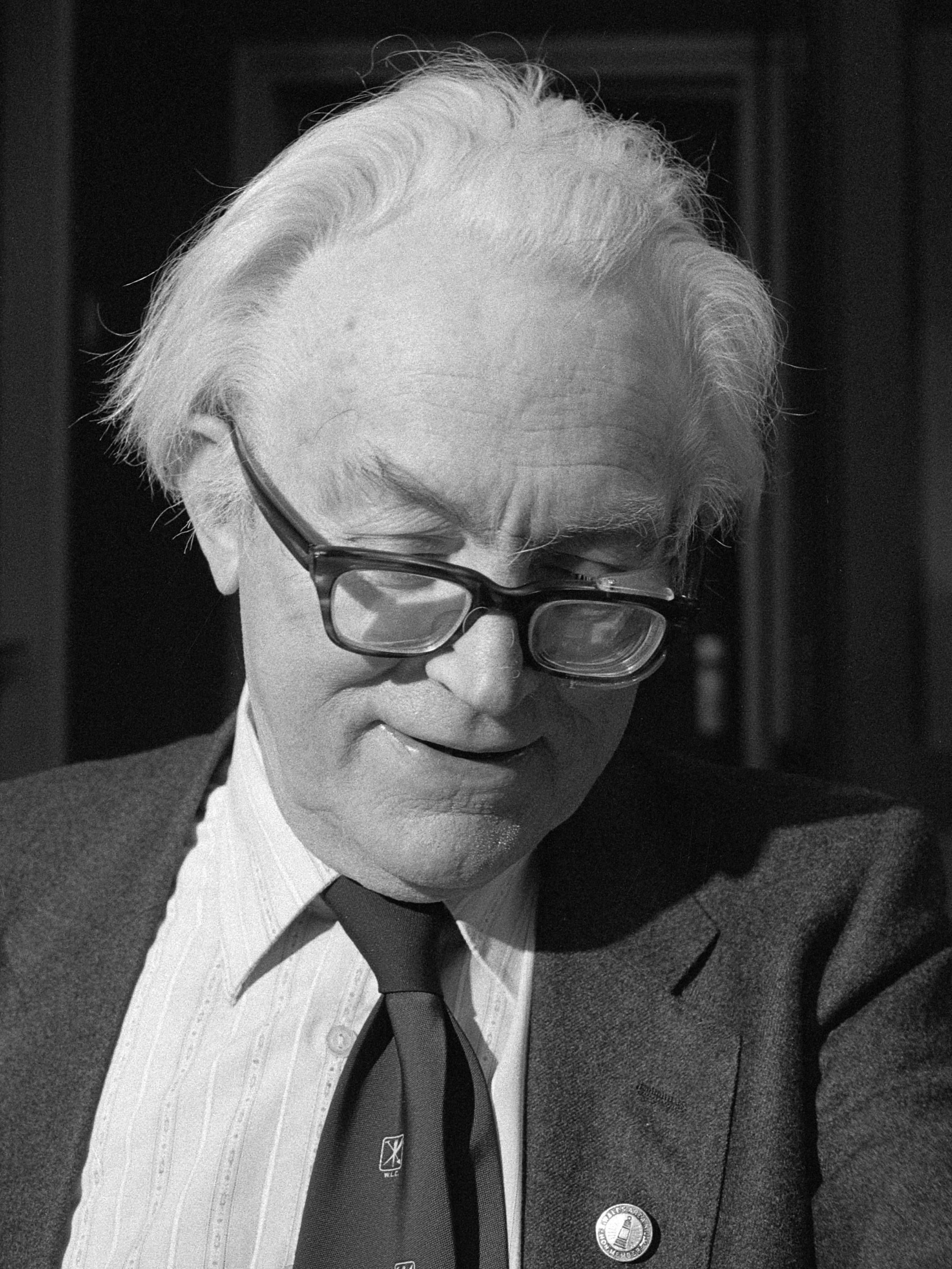

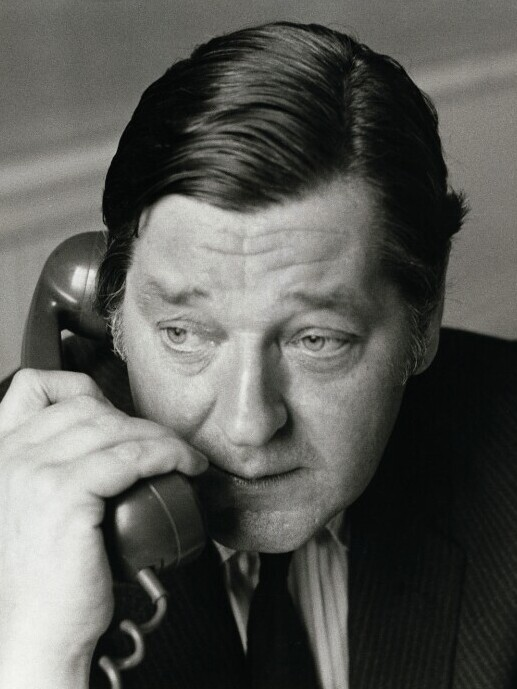
Candidate	Edward Short	Michael Foot	Anthony Crosland
First ballot	111 (42.5%)	89 (34.1%)	61 (23.4%)
Second ballot	145 (55.6%)	116 (44.4%)	Eliminated
Deputy Leader before election
Roy Jenkins
Elected Deputy Leader
Edward Short

The 1972 Labour Party deputy leadership election took place in April 1972 after Roy Jenkins resigned as deputy leader over the decision to hold a referendum on Britain's entry into the Common Market.

Edward Short, formerly Education Secretary in the government of Harold Wilson, was regarded as a "unity" candidate, and won the election over his main rival, the left-winger Michael Foot, who had unsuccessfully stood for the deputy leadership in 1970 and 1971.

== Candidates ==
- Anthony Crosland, Shadow Secretary of State for Environment, Member of Parliament for Great Grimsby
- Michael Foot, Shadow Leader of the House of Commons, Member of Parliament for Ebbw Vale
- Edward Short, Shadow Secretary of State for Education and Science, Member of Parliament for Newcastle upon Tyne Central

== Results ==
First ballot: 20 April 1972
Candidate	Votes	%
Edward Short	111	39.4
Michael Foot	110	39.0
Anthony Crosland	61	21.6
Second ballot required

As a result of the first round, Crosland was eliminated. The remaining two candidates would face each other in a second round. The next day's The Glasgow Herald reported that both Short and Crosland attracted more votes than had been expected and that Short was the favourite to pick up most of Crosland's votes.

Second ballot: 25 April 1972
Candidate	Votes	%
Edward Short	145	55.6
Michael Foot	116	44.4
Edward Short elected

Reporting on the result, The Glasgow Herald's political correspondent John Warden stated that Short was "reckoned to be the least divisive of the three candidates for the post". The same report noted that Short called for "unity and toleration in the Labour Party" in the wake of his victory. An editorial in the same newspaper argued the result was a foregone conclusion after the first ballot, but warned that be settling for a compromise candidate "Labour may not have solved their difficulties".
