= 1985 Tyne Bridge by-election =

UK parliamentary by-election

- 5 Dec 1985

Constituency of Tyne Bridge
- Turnout: 38.1% (▼23.4%)
	First party	Second party	Third party
		SDP	Con
Candidate	David Clelland	Rod Kenyon	Jacqui Lait
Party	Labour	SDP	Conservative
Popular vote	13,517	6,942	2,588
Percentage	57.8%	29.7%	11.1%
Swing	▲1.3%	▲11.4%	▼14.1%
MP before election
Harry Lowe Cowans
Labour
Subsequent MP
David Clelland
Labour

The 1985 Tyne Bridge by-election was a parliamentary by-election held on 5 December 1985 for the British House of Commons constituency of Tyne Bridge.

== Previous MP ==
The seat fell vacant when the constituency's Labour Member of Parliament (MP), Harry Lowes Cowans (19 December 1932 – 3 October 1985) died.

Cowans was elected MP for Newcastle-upon-Tyne Central at a 1976 by-election. After boundary changes, he was elected for Tyne Bridge in the 1983 general election.

== Candidates ==
Six candidates were nominated. The list below is set out in descending order of the number of votes received at the by-election.

1. Representing the Labour Party was David Gordon Clelland (born 27 June 1943), who was 42 years old at the time of the by-election. He was a member of the Engineering Union, who had worked on the shop floor for 22 years before being made redundant. He was secretary of a local government association and was leader of Gateshead Council at the time of the by-election. Clelland was the Member of Parliament for Tyne Bridge until 2010.
2. The Social Democratic Party (SDP) candidate, representing the SDP-Liberal Alliance, was Rod Kenyon. He was a Personnel Manager for Northern Gas and was aged 40 at the time of the by-election. He had contested the seat of Houghton and Washington in the 1983 general election.
3. The Conservative candidate was Mrs. Jacqueline Anne "Jacqui" Lait (born on 16 December 1947), a then 37-year-old with a Westminster and European Parliamentary Consultancy. Since 1985 Mrs. Lait has served in the House of Commons, first representing Hastings and Rye from 1992 until she was defeated in the 1997 general election. She was then returned, at a by-election later in 1997, as MP for Beckenham, which she represented until 2010.
4. John Connell was an independent, using the ballot paper label "Peace Candidate".
5. George Weiss (born 1940) was another Independent candidate, using the ballot paper label "Captain Rainbow Universal Party (Abolish Parliament)".
6. Peter Reid Smith was nominated with the description "New National". During the campaign he admitted that he had forged the signatures of the ten electors needed on his nomination papers; he was subsequently charged with forgery.

== Result ==
1985 by-election: Tyne Bridge
Party	Candidate	Votes	%	±%
Labour	David Clelland	13,517	57.8	+1.3
SDP	Rod Kenyon	6,942	29.7	+11.4 ^{a}
Conservative	Jacqui Lait	2,588	11.1	−14.1
Independent	John Connell	250	1.1	New
Independent	George Weiss	38	0.2	New
Independent	Peter Smith	32	0.1	New
Majority		6,575	28.1	−3.2
Turnout		23,367	38.1	−23.4
Labour hold		Swing		
Registered electors		61,400		

Note:

- ^{a} Change from the Liberal candidate who represented the SDP-Liberal Alliance in the 1983 general election.

== See also ==
- Tyne Bridge constituency
- List of United Kingdom by-elections
- United Kingdom by-election records

== Sources ==
- Britain Votes/Europe Votes By-Election Supplement 1983-, compiled and edited by F.W.S. Craig (Parliamentary Research Services 1985)
