= Tyne Bridge (constituency) =

UK Parliament constituency (1983–2010)

Coordinates: 54.968°N 1.606°W

- Former borough constituency for the House of Commons
- Boundary of Tyne Bridge in Tyne and Wear for the 2005 general election

- Location of Tyne and Wear within England
- County: Tyne and Wear

1983–2010
- Seats: One
- Created from: Gateshead West, Newcastle upon Tyne Central, Newcastle upon Tyne West, Blaydon, Newcastle upon Tyne North and Gateshead East
- Replaced by: Gateshead, Newcastle upon Tyne Central

Tyne Bridge was a parliamentary constituency in the north east of England, represented in the House of Commons of the Parliament of the United Kingdom, from 1983 until 2010. It elected one Member of Parliament (MP) by the first past the post system of election.

== History ==
The constituency was created as a result of the Boundary Commission for England review of parliamentary seats for the 1983 general election following the reorganisation of local government under the Local Government Act 1972 which brought the metropolitan county of Tyne and Wear into existence. It covered central Tyneside in Tyne and Wear, with part of the constituency being north of the River Tyne in Newcastle (including the city centre), and the other part being south of the river, in Gateshead. It is named after the Tyne Bridge that crosses the river. It included parts of six different constituencies which had been in existence before the review (see Infobox).

It was abolished at the review of parliamentary representation coming into effect for the 2010 general election, being replaced by the re-established constituency of Gateshead south of the River Tyne, and by the Newcastle upon Tyne Central constituency to the north.

Tyne Bridge was a safe seat for the Labour Party throughout its existence.

== Boundaries ==
=== 1983–1997 ===
- The City of Newcastle wards of Benwell, Elswick, Scotswood, and West City; and
- the Metropolitan Borough of Gateshead wards of Bede, Bensham, Dunston, and Teams.

=== 1997–2010 ===
- The City of Newcastle wards of Benwell, Elswick, Scotswood, and West City; and
- the Metropolitan Borough of Gateshead wards of Bede, Bensham, Deckham, Dunston, Saltwell, and Teams.

Deckham and Saltwell wards were added to the seat from the abolished Gateshead East constituency.

== Members of Parliament ==
Election	Member	Party	Notes
1983	Harry Cowans	Labour	Previously MP for Newcastle Central since November 1976 by-election. Died in office October 1985
1985 by-election	David Clelland	Labour	Elected in December 1985 by-election. Retired 2010 following boundary changes
2010	constituency abolished: see Gateshead & Newcastle-upon-Tyne Central		

== Election results ==
=== Elections in the 1980s ===
General election 1983: Tyne Bridge
Party	Candidate	Votes	%	±%
Labour	Harry Cowans	21,127	56.5	
Conservative	Randall S. Crawley	9,434	25.2	
Liberal	Tony Dawson	6,852	18.3	
Majority		11,693	31.3	
Turnout		37,413	61.5	
Labour win (new seat)				

1985 Tyne Bridge by-election
Party	Candidate	Votes	%	±%
Labour	David Clelland	13,517	57.8	+1.3
SDP	Rod Kenyon	6,942	29.7	+11.4
Conservative	Jacqui Lait	2,588	11.1	−14.1
Independent	John Connell	250	1.1	New
Independent	George Weiss	38	0.2	New
Independent	Peter R. Smith	32	0.1	New
Majority		6,575	28.1	−3.2
Turnout		23,367	38.1	−23.4
Registered electors		61,400		
Labour hold		Swing		

General election 1987: Tyne Bridge
Party	Candidate	Votes	%	±%
Labour	David Clelland	23,131	63.0	+6.5
Conservative	Michael Walton Bates	7,558	20.6	−4.6
SDP	John Mansfield	6,005	16.4	−1.9
Majority		15,573	42.4	+11.1
Turnout		36,694	63.1	+1.6
Labour hold		Swing		

=== Elections in the 1990s ===
General election 1992: Tyne Bridge
Party	Candidate	Votes	%	±%
Labour	David Clelland	22,328	67.2	+4.2
Conservative	Charles M. Liddell-Grainger	7,118	21.4	+0.8
Liberal Democrats	John S. Burt	3,804	11.4	−5.0
Majority		15,210	45.8	+3.4
Turnout		33,250	62.6	−0.5
Labour hold		Swing	+1.7	

General election 1997: Tyne Bridge
Party	Candidate	Votes	%	±%
Labour	David Clelland	26,767	76.8	+10.0
Conservative	Adrian H. Lee	3,861	11.1	−11.0
Liberal Democrats	Mary Wallace	2,785	8.0	−3.1
Referendum	Graeme R. Oswald	919	2.6	New
Socialist	Elaine Brumskill	518	1.5	New
Majority		22,906	65.7	+20.9
Turnout		34,850	57.1	−5.5
Labour hold		Swing	+10.5	

=== Elections in the 2000s ===
General election 2001: Tyne Bridge
Party	Candidate	Votes	%	±%
Labour	David Clelland	18,345	70.5	−6.3
Conservative	James Cook	3,456	13.3	+2.2
Liberal Democrats	Jonathan C. Wallace	3,213	12.3	+4.3
Socialist Labour	James Fitzpatrick	533	2.0	New
Socialist Alliance	Samuel J. Robson	485	1.9	New
Majority		14,889	57.2	−8.5
Turnout		26,032	44.2	−12.9
Labour hold		Swing		

General election 2005: Tyne Bridge
Party	Candidate	Votes	%	±%
Labour	David Clelland	16,151	61.2	−9.3
Liberal Democrats	Chris P. Boyle	5,751	21.8	+9.5
Conservative	Tom E. Fairhead	2,962	11.2	−2.1
BNP	Kevin Scott	1,072	4.1	New
Respect	Jill C. Russell	447	1.7	New
Majority		10,400	39.4	−17.8
Turnout		26,383	49.3	+5.1
Labour hold		Swing	-9.4	

== See also ==
- History of parliamentary constituencies and boundaries in Tyne and Wear
