= Jacqui Lait =

British politician (born 1947)

Shadow Secretary of State for Scotland
- In office 14 September 2001 – 10 November 2003
- Leader: Iain Duncan Smith
- Preceded by: George Robertson^{[a]}
- Succeeded by: Peter Duncan

Member of Parliament for Beckenham
- In office 20 November 1997 – 12 April 2010
- Preceded by: Piers Merchant
- Succeeded by: Bob Stewart

Member of Parliament for Hastings and Rye
- In office 9 April 1992 – 8 April 1997
- Preceded by: Kenneth Warren
- Succeeded by: Michael Foster

Personal details
- Born: 16 December 1947 (age 78) Paisley, Renfrewshire, Scotland
- Party: Conservative
- Spouse: Peter Jones
- Education: University of Strathclyde
- a. Office vacant from 2 May 1997 to 14 September 2001

Jacqueline Anne Harkness Lait (born 16 December 1947) is a British Conservative Party politician and former Member of Parliament (MP) for the constituencies of Hastings and Rye (1992–1997) and Beckenham (1997–2010).

== Early life ==
Lait was born in Paisley, Renfrewshire, attending Paisley Grammar School and the University of Strathclyde, where she received a bachelor's degree in business management. After graduating, Lait worked in public relations for the jute industry in Dundee later working for the television news agency Visnews. Lait worked for the Government Information Service and later the Department of Employment in 1974. In 1980, Lait joined the Chemical Industries Association as parliamentary adviser. She has also run her own parliamentary consultancy.

== Political career ==
Lait was a candidate for Strathclyde West for the 1984 European elections and the following year stood in the by-election for Tyne Bridge where she finished in third place behind David Clelland and Rod Kenyon. She was selected as the Conservative candidate for Hastings and Rye in April 1991.

Lait won the Hastings and Rye seat in the 1992 general election and in 1996 became the first female Conservative Whip. She lost her seat at the 1997 general election, following a dispute with local fishermen, but later in the same year was elected MP for Beckenham via a by-election following the resignation of Piers Merchant.

Upon the election of the new Conservative leader Iain Duncan Smith in September 2001, Lait was appointed Shadow Secretary of State for Scotland. The position had been vacant since 1997 as the Conservatives had no representation in the UK Parliament from Scottish constituencies. After Michael Howard replaced Duncan Smith as Conservative leader in November 2003, he reshuffled the shadow cabinet, appointing Peter Duncan, who was elected to the Scottish constituency Galloway and Upper Nithsdale in the 2001 election, as Shadow Scottish Secretary while reassigning Lait to serve as shadow Home Affairs Minister. A reshuffle after the 2005 general election saw her appointed as shadow Minister for London. Two years later, she received the additional duties of shadow Minister for Planning under David Cameron's leadership.

During the United Kingdom parliamentary expenses scandal, she was discovered to have over-claimed for the mortgage interest on her second home, and was ordered to pay back over £7,000.

Lait stood down as an MP at the 2010 general election.

== Personal life ==
Lait is married to Peter Jones, former leader of East Sussex County Council.

Parliament of the United Kingdom
Preceded by Kenneth Warren	Member of Parliament for Hastings and Rye; 1992–1997	Succeeded by Michael Jabez Foster
Preceded by Piers Merchant	Member of Parliament for Beckenham; 1997 – 2010	Succeeded by Bob Stewart
Vacant Title last held by George Robertson (1993–97)	Shadow Secretary of State for Scotland; 2001–2003	Succeeded by Peter Duncan
