= Philip Goodhart =

British politician

Sir Philip Goodhart
- Photographed in 1959

Parliamentary Under-Secretary of State for Northern Ireland
- In office 4 May 1979 – 5 January 1981
- Prime Minister: Margaret Thatcher
- Preceded by: James Dunn
- Succeeded by: David Mitchell

Member of Parliament for Beckenham
- In office 21 March 1957 – 16 March 1992
- Preceded by: Patrick Buchan-Hepburn
- Succeeded by: Piers Merchant

Personal details
- Born: Philip Carter Goodhart; 3 November 1925 London, England
- Died: 5 July 2015 (aged 89)
- Party: Conservative
- Spouse: Valerie Winant (m. 1950; died 2014)
- Children: 7 (including David)
- Relatives: Arthur Lehman Goodhart (father); William Goodhart (brother); Charles Goodhart (brother)
- Education: Hotchkiss School
- Alma mater: Trinity College, Cambridge

Sir Philip Carter Goodhart (3 November 1925 – 5 July 2015) was a British Conservative politician, the son of Arthur Lehman Goodhart.

== Biography ==
Goodhart attended the Hotchkiss School in Lakeville, Connecticut. He contested Consett in 1950 while still a student at Trinity College, Cambridge. He was elected Member of Parliament for Beckenham at a 1957 by-election, and continued to represent the seat until his retirement in 1992. He made his maiden speech on army equipment and later on in life became involved in the preservation of warships, to which he devoted much time and about which he also published books.

In his book Referendum (1971), Goodhart argued that the EEC membership referendum, then under discussion in the context of the United Kingdom (UK) joining the European Economic Community (EEC), could in fact serve to entrench constitutional safeguards that the UK lacked, quoting Arthur Balfour's contribution to the debate on the Parliament Bill (later the Parliament Act 1911): "In the referendum lies our hope of getting the sort of constitutional security which every other country but our own enjoys ..." (Referendum, p. 205). He wrote an account of the 1975 referendum campaign, Full-hearted Consent (1975), and also The 1922: The Story of the 1922 Committee (1973).

Goodhart was a junior Northern Ireland minister (1979–1981) and a junior defence minister (1981). He was also a member of the Founding Council of the Rothermere American Institute at the University of Oxford.

In 1950, Goodhart married Valerie Forbes Winant (died 2014), a niece of John Gilbert Winant. They had seven children: Arthur, Sarah, David, Rachel, Harriet, Rebecca and Daniel. The couple lived in Whitebarn, Youlbury Woods, Oxford. Goodhart died in 2015, aged 89. His son David is the director of the Demos thinktank and writes for Prospect magazine.

== Works ==
- —; Henderson, Ian (1958). The Hunt for Kimathi. Hamish Hamilton. ASIN B0000CJZHT.
- — (1965). Fifty ships that saved the world : the foundation of the Anglo-American alliance. Heinemann. ASIN B001AGS7YE.
- —; Chataway, Christopher J. (1968). War Without Weapons. W. H. Allen. ISBN 978-0-49100431-2.
- — (1971). Referendum. Tom Stacey Ltd. ISBN 978-0-85468063-4.
- —; Branston, Ursula (1973). The 1922: The Story of the 1922 Committee. Macmillan. ISBN 978-0-33314386-5.
- — (1976). Full-hearted Consent: Story of the Referendum Campaign and the Campaign for the Referendum. Davis-Poynter. ISBN 978-0-70670206-4.
- — (2005). The Royal Americans. Wilton65. ISBN 978-1-90506001-6.

== Sources ==
- Wood, Alan (June 1987). "The Times" Guide to the House of Commons. HarperCollins. ISBN 978-0-72300298-7.
- Leigh Rayment's Historical List of MPs
- Flade, Roland (1999). The Lehmans: From Rimpar to the New World: A Family History (2nd Enlarged ed.). Konigshausen & Neumann. ISBN 978-3-8260-1844-2.

Parliament of the United Kingdom
| Preceded by Patrick Buchan-Hepburn | Member of Parliament for Beckenham; 1957–1992 | Succeeded by Piers Merchant |
