= Alfred Denville =

British Conservative Party politician

Alfred Arthur Hinchcliffe Denville (27 January 1876 – 23 March 1955) was an English actor, theatre impresario and Conservative Party politician.

Denville, an actor by trade, ran one of the UK's leading repertory companies. In 1924, Denville founded Denville Hall, a retirement home for actors in Northwood, London that is still in operation. He dedicated it in memory of his son Jack, who had died at the age of 26 after onstage complications with re-aggravated World War I injuries. Following his own death, aged 79, in 1955, he left the home £5,000 in his will.

As a politician, Denville was elected as the Member of Parliament (MP) for Newcastle upon Tyne Central, succeeding Labour's Sir Charles Trevelyan in the 1931 general election, and held the seat until he was defeated in 1945. For a time, Denville was associated with the far right of the Conservative Party, and during the 1930s was a leading member of the Friends of National Spain, which stressed support for Francisco Franco and anti-communism. He had also declared himself to be an admirer of Benito Mussolini, although, in keeping with a number of contemporary Tories who admired the southern European fascists, he was critical of Adolf Hitler.

Parliament of the United Kingdom
| Preceded by Sir Charles Trevelyan | Member of Parliament for Newcastle upon Tyne Central; 1931–1945 | Succeeded by Lyall Wilkes |
