= Harry Cowans =

British politician

Harry Lowes Cowans MP (19 December 1932 – 3 October 1985) was a British Labour Party politician.

Cowans was elected Member of Parliament for Newcastle-upon-Tyne Central at a 1976 by-election. After boundary changes, he was elected for Tyne Bridge in 1983. From 1983 to 1985, he served as Chair of the Transport Select Committee. He was known for his efforts to save the Newcastle Metro system from proposed budget cuts.

Cowans died in office aged 52 in 1985. His cremated remains are buried in Saltwell Cemetery, Gateshead.

Parliament of the United Kingdom
Preceded by Ted Short	Member of Parliament for Newcastle-upon-Tyne Central; 1976–1983	Succeeded by Piers Merchant
New constituency	Member of Parliament for Tyne Bridge; 1983–1985	Succeeded by David Clelland
