= Edward Short, Baron Glenamara =

British politician and life peer (1912–2012)

The Right Honourable The Lord Glenamara CH PC
- Short in 1964

Leader of the House of Commons Lord President of the Council
- In office 5 March 1974 – 8 April 1976
- Prime Minister: Harold Wilson
- Preceded by: Jim Prior
- Succeeded by: Michael Foot

Deputy Leader of the Labour Party
- In office 25 April 1972 – 8 April 1976
- Leader: Harold Wilson
- Preceded by: Roy Jenkins
- Succeeded by: Michael Foot

Shadow Leader of the House of Commons
- In office 6 December 1972 – 4 March 1974
- Leader: Harold Wilson
- Preceded by: Michael Foot
- Succeeded by: Jim Prior

Shadow Secretary of State for Education and Science
- In office 20 June 1970 – 6 December 1972
- Leader: Harold Wilson
- Preceded by: Margaret Thatcher
- Succeeded by: Roy Hattersley

Secretary of State for Education and Science
- In office 6 April 1968 – 20 June 1970
- Prime Minister: Harold Wilson
- Preceded by: Patrick Gordon Walker
- Succeeded by: Margaret Thatcher

Postmaster General
- In office 4 July 1966 – 6 April 1968
- Prime Minister: Harold Wilson
- Preceded by: Tony Benn
- Succeeded by: Roy Mason

Government Chief Whip in the House of Commons Parliamentary Secretary to the Treasury
- In office 16 October 1964 – 4 July 1966
- Prime Minister: Harold Wilson
- Deputy: Sydney Irving (1964–66); John Silkin (1966)
- Preceded by: Martin Redmayne
- Succeeded by: John Silkin

Opposition Deputy Chief Whip of the House of Commons
- In office 7 March 1962 – 16 October 1964
- Leader: Hugh Gaitskell; George Brown; Harold Wilson
- Preceded by: John Taylor
- Succeeded by: William Whitelaw

Member of the House of Lords
- Lord Temporal
- Life peerage 28 January 1977 – 4 May 2012

Member of Parliament for Newcastle upon Tyne Central
- In office 25 October 1951 – 12 October 1976
- Preceded by: Lyall Wilkes
- Succeeded by: Harry Cowans

Personal details
- Born: Edward Watson Short; 17 December 1912 Warcop, England
- Died: 4 May 2012 (aged 99) Hexham, England
- Party: Labour
- Spouse: Jennie Sewell (m. 1941; died 2008)
- Children: 2
- Education: College of the Venerable Bede
- Profession: Teacher

Military service
- Allegiance: United Kingdom
- Branch/service: British Army
- Rank: Captain
- Unit: Durham Light Infantry
- Battles/wars: Second World War

Edward Watson Short, Baron Glenamara, CH, PC (17 December 1912 – 4 May 2012) was a British Labour Party politician and deputy leader of the Labour Party. He was Member of Parliament (MP) for Newcastle upon Tyne Central and served as a minister during the Labour governments under Harold Wilson, before being appointed to the House of Lords shortly after James Callaghan became Prime Minister.

Following the death of James Allason on 16 June 2011, Short was the oldest living former member of the British House of Commons. He died just under a year later, aged 99. At the time of his death he was the oldest member of the House of Lords.

== Early career ==
Short was born in Warcop, Westmorland. His father Charles Short, a draper, was married to Mary. Short qualified as a teacher at College of the Venerable Bede, Durham University, before completing a second degree, in law, at London University. He taught on Tyneside until enlisting in 1939. He served as a Captain in the Durham Light Infantry of the British Army during the Second World War. After leaving the army he returned to teaching, becoming Newcastle branch secretary of the National Union of Teachers and in 1947, head of Princess Louise Boys' School, Blyth. He married Jennie Sewell in 1941, and they had two children.

Short joined the Labour Party in 1942 and was elected a councillor on Newcastle City Council in 1948, where he led the Labour Group within two years. He was first elected to Parliament for Newcastle upon Tyne Central at the 1951 general election. He was appointed to the Privy Council in 1964, and was made a Member of the Order of the Companions of Honour in 1976.

== Postmaster General ==
Short was responsible for the outlawing of pirate radio stations such as Radio Caroline. Following the government campaign against the pirates previously led by Tony Benn, his predecessor in the post of Postmaster-General (then the minister with responsibility for broadcasting), Short was responsible for introducing the bill which became the Marine, &c., Broadcasting (Offences) Act 1967. In a 1982 interview for BBC Radio's The Story of Pop Radio, Short admitted having enjoyed listening to some of those stations, particularly Radio 390.

As Postmaster General, Short ordered the creation of the 1966 England Winners stamp to celebrate England's victory in the 1966 FIFA World Cup.

== Education Secretary ==
He subsequently served as Education Secretary from 1968 to 1970, and became Labour's deputy leader on 25 April 1972 after Roy Jenkins resigned over differences on European policy. Short was seen at the time as a "safe pair of hands". His main rival for the job was the left-winger Michael Foot who was viewed by many on the centre and right of the party as a divisive figure. Short defeated Foot and Anthony Crosland in the same vote. During his tenure he ended the policy of free milk for secondary school students, a policy that would be controversially extended to 7-11 year olds by his Conservative Party successor Margaret Thatcher.

== Lord President of the Council ==
Short's new seniority was reflected in 1974 as his appointment as Lord President of the Council – though not Deputy Prime Minister. While he stood in for Wilson at cabinet meetings and prime minister's questions, he did not have the stature to mount a leadership bid himself upon the prime minister's retirement in 1976. He was not offered a Cabinet post on James Callaghan's election as Prime Minister. His resignation letter said that the time had come for him to step aside for a younger man; this was sarcasm, as he was replaced by Michael Foot, who was only seven months younger than himself. Short was also nine months younger than Callaghan, who had dropped him from the cabinet. Barbara Castle made similar remarks, having also been dropped from the cabinet.

== Peerage ==
He was made a life peer as Baron Glenamara, of Glenridding in the County of Cumbria on 28 January 1977, a few months after he had left the Commons. One year prior to that, he was appointed Chairman of Cable and Wireless Ltd, which was at the time a nationalised industry. He served in that post until 1980.

As a life peer he was a member of the House of Lords, although a few years before his death he ceased to attend regularly.

His name lives on in the House of Commons with the term "Short Money". This refers to funds paid by the Government to help run the Parliamentary office of the Leader of the Opposition. The then Mr Short pioneered this idea during his time in the House.

He was made a Freeman of the City of Newcastle in 2001 "in recognition of his eminent and outstanding public service" and served as Chancellor of the University of Northumbria, a post he retired from in 2005. Short died in Hexham on 4 May 2012, at the age of 99.

Coat of arms of Edward Short, Baron Glenamara
Crest Out of the Top of a Tower proper two Trefoils Vert volant therefrom a Bee proper; Escutcheon Sable four Portcullises each dimidiating a Covered Cup two in chief one in base that in fess between two Bars Gemel Gold; Supporters Dexter: a Stag guardant proper the dexter foreleg supporting a Board Vert; Sinister: a Sea-Horse proper; Motto Levavi Oculos Meos (I have lifted up mine eyes)

Parliament of the United Kingdom
Preceded by Lyall Wilkes	Member of Parliament for Newcastle upon Tyne Central; 1951–1976	Succeeded by Harry Cowans
Political offices
Preceded by Herbert Bowden	Government Chief Whip in the House of Commons; 1964–1966	Succeeded by John Silkin
Preceded by Martin Redmayne	Parliamentary Secretary to the Treasury; 1964–1966	Succeeded by John Silkin
Preceded by Tony Benn	Postmaster General; 1966–1968	Succeeded by Roy Mason
Preceded by Patrick Gordon Walker	Secretary of State for Education and Science; 1968–1970	Succeeded by Margaret Thatcher
Preceded by James Prior	Leader of the House of Commons; 1974–1976	Succeeded by Michael Foot
Preceded by James Prior	Lord President of the Council; 1974–1976	Succeeded by Michael Foot
Party political offices
Preceded by John Taylor	Deputy Labour Chief Whip of the House of Commons; 1962–1964	Succeeded by Sydney Irving
Preceded by Herbert Bowden	Labour Chief Whip of the House of Commons; 1964–1966	Succeeded by John Silkin
Preceded by Roy Jenkins	Deputy Leader of the Labour Party; 1972–1976	Succeeded by Michael Foot
Academic offices
New office	Chancellor of Northumbria University; 1992–2005	Succeeded by The Lord Stevens of Kirkwhelpington
