= Piers Merchant =

British politician (1951–2009)

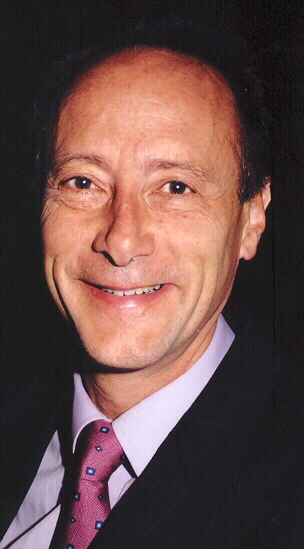

Member of Parliament for Newcastle upon Tyne Central
- In office 9 June 1983 – 18 May 1987
- Preceded by: Harry Cowans
- Succeeded by: Jim Cousins

Member of Parliament for Beckenham
- In office 9 April 1992 – 27 October 1997
- Preceded by: Philip Goodhart
- Succeeded by: Jacqui Lait

Personal details
- Born: Piers Rolf Garfield Merchant; 2 January 1951
- Died: 21 September 2009 (aged 58)
- Party: Conservative (until 2004); UKIP (from 2004)
- Spouse: Helen Burrluck (m. 1977)
- Education: University College, Durham

Piers Rolf Garfield Merchant (2 January 1951 – 21 September 2009) was a British Conservative Party politician who was the Member of Parliament (MP) for Newcastle upon Tyne Central from 1983 to 1987, and then MP for Beckenham from 1992 until he resigned in October 1997 following a scandal.

== Education ==
Merchant was educated at Nottingham High School and the University of Durham, where he studied law and politics. He then worked for nine years at The Journal (Newcastle).

== Political career ==
Merchant was first elected to the House of Commons at the 1983 general election for the Newcastle Central constituency, but lost his seat in the 1987 general election. He returned to parliament as the MP for Beckenham at the 1992 general election.

He was caught by The Sun romancing with a teenage nightclub hostess on a park bench in south-east London.

He resigned in 1997 following allegations that he was having an affair with his researcher. He later claimed that the whole affair had been set up by his one time assistant and family friend, Anthony Gilberthorpe, for a payment of £25,000 from the Sunday Mirror.

In the 2004 European Parliament election, Merchant stood for the UK Independence Party (UKIP) in the North East England constituency at the top of its party list. He was not elected. In 2005 he was the UKIP candidate for the Torrington Rural ward in the Devon County Council election, but finished fourth of the four candidates.

Piers Merchant worked for some years in various capacities for UKIP, also, for a time, he acted as UKIP General Secretary.

== Personal life ==
In 2005, Merchant and his family moved to Great Torrington in North Devon.

In July 2009 he was diagnosed with advanced multisite metastatic prostate cancer. He died on 21 September 2009.

Parliament of the United Kingdom
Preceded by Harry Cowans	Member of Parliament for Newcastle upon Tyne Central; 1983 – 1987	Succeeded by Jim Cousins
Preceded by Philip Goodhart	Member of Parliament for Beckenham; 1992 – 1997	Succeeded by Jacqui Lait
