= Chi Onwurah =

British politician (born 1965)

Dame Chi Onwurah DBE MP
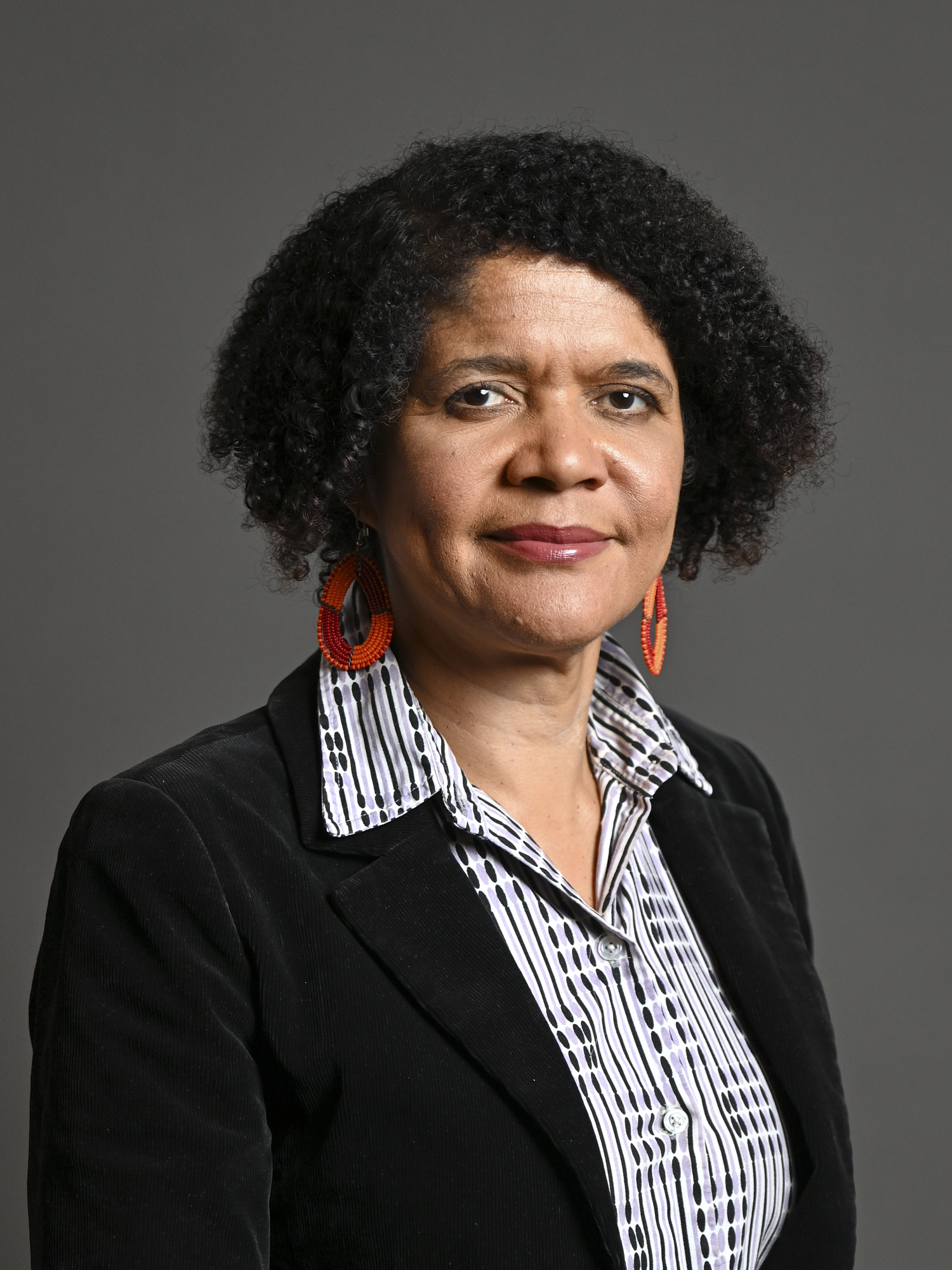
- Official portrait, 2024

Chair of the Science, Innovation and Technology Select Committee (Note: Science and Technology (2020–2023))
- Incumbent
- Assumed office 11 September 2024
- Preceded by: Greg Clark

Member of Parliament for Newcastle upon Tyne Central and West Newcastle upon Tyne Central (2010–2024)
- Incumbent
- Assumed office 6 May 2010
- Preceded by: Jim Cousins
- Majority: 11,060 (26.7%)
Shadow portfolios
2020–2024	Science, Research and Innovation
2016–2020	Industrial Strategy, Science and Innovation
2015–2016	Culture and Digital Economy
2013–2015	Cabinet Office
2010–2013	Innovation and Science

Personal details
- Born: 12 April 1965 (age 61) Wallsend, Northumberland, England
- Party: Labour
- Education: Imperial College London (BEng); Manchester Business School (MBA)
- Website: chionwurahmp.com

Dame Chinyelu Susan "Chi" Onwurah (born 12 April 1965) is a British politician who has served as Member of Parliament (MP) for Newcastle upon Tyne Central and West since 2024, and previously for Newcastle upon Tyne Central from 2010 to 2024, when the constituency was abolished. She is a member of the Labour Party.

Onwurah was the shadow minister for Industrial Strategy, Science and Innovation under Labour leader Jeremy Corbyn from October 2016 until April 2020, when she was appointed shadow minister for Science, Research and Digital by Keir Starmer.

== Early life ==
Onwurah's mother was from Newcastle. Her father, from Nigeria, was working as a dentist while he studied at Newcastle University Medical School when they met and married in the 1950s.

Onwurah was born on 12 April 1965 in Wallsend, then in Northumberland. While she was still in her infancy the family moved to Awka, Nigeria, in 1965. Just two years later, the Biafra War broke out, bringing famine with it, forcing her mother to bring the children back to Tyneside, while her father stayed there in the Biafran army.

Onwurah attended Kenton School in Newcastle and graduated from Imperial College London in 1987 with a degree in electrical engineering. She worked in hardware and software development, product management, market development and strategy for a variety of mainly private sector companies in a number of different countries – the UK, France, the United States, Nigeria and Denmark – while studying for an MBA at Manchester Business School.

Prior to entering Parliament, Onwurah was Head of Telecoms Technology at Ofcom, with a focus on broadband provision.

== Political career ==
Before entering Parliament, Onwurah was active in the Anti-Apartheid Movement. She spent many years on its National Executive, and that of its successor organisation, ACTSA: Action for Southern Africa. She also joined the advisory board of the Open University Business School.

=== Parliamentary career ===
Onwurah was elected as the Member of Parliament (MP) for Newcastle upon Tyne Central at the 2010 general election with a majority of 7,466. She succeeded the previous Labour MP Jim Cousins, who had decided to step down after 23 years. She described Parliament as a "culture shock", but also said that compared with her engineering background "parliament is the most diverse working environment I've ever been in, the most gender balanced".

Onwurah supported Ed Miliband in the 2010 Labour Party leadership election. Miliband appointed Onwurah as a junior shadow minister for Business, Innovation and Skills on 10 October 2010.

In January 2013, Onwurah was given a new "wide-ranging role" as a Shadow Minister for the Cabinet Office, focusing on "cyber security, social entrepreneurship and open government." Departing from the post in September 2015, she was succeeded by Louise Haigh.

On 11 September 2024, she was appointed Chair of the Science, Innovation and Technology Select Committee.

==== Campaigning on gender issues ====
In February 2014, Onwurah spoke in a parliamentary debate called at her initiative on the topic of gender-specific toy marketing. She also lent her support to the campaign Let Toys Be Toys. In her speech to the House of Commons, she said:

"Before entering Parliament, I spent two decades as a professional engineer, working across three continents. Regardless of where I was or the size of the company, it was always a predominantly male, or indeed all-male, environment, but it is only when I walk into a toy shop that I feel I am really experiencing gender segregation."

She later told Kira Cochrane of The Guardian that she believes the limiting of children by gender stereotypes is a serious economic issue, with the proportion of female students on engineering degree courses having fallen from 12% to 8% in the thirty years since she had started studying for one herself. Referring to a shortage of engineers and the UK having "the lowest proportion in Europe of women who are professional engineers", she said "toys are so important and formative, and for me this is about the jobs of the future, about what happens in 10 or 15 years' time. We can't go on with a segregated society."

=== Leadership elections and shadow frontbench roles ===
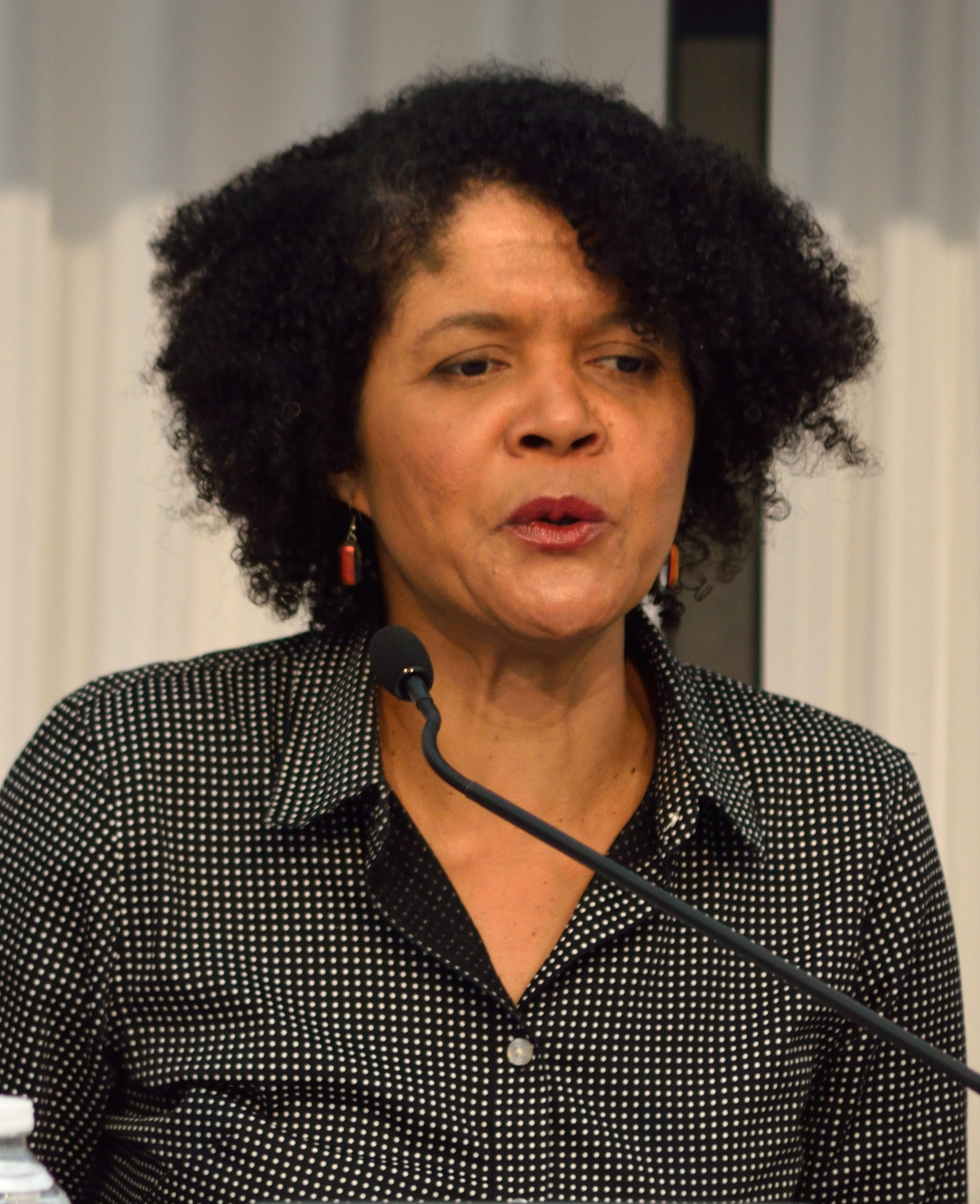
Onwurah at the 2016 Labour Party Conference

In the 2015 Labour Party leadership election, Onwurah announced her support for Andy Burnham, having originally nominated Jeremy Corbyn to "broaden the debate". At the time, Onwurah was the only chartered engineer serving within the Parliamentary Labour Party, a distinction she frequently highlighted when advocating for industrial and technological literacy in legislative planning

After Jeremy Corbyn won the leadership election of the Labour party in September 2015, Onwurah was made a Shadow Minister for Business, Innovation and Skills, as well as a Shadow Minister for Culture, Media and Sport.

==== Racial discrimination controversy ====
In the January 2016 reshuffle, Onwurah's frontbench role for culture and the digital economy was briefly split between herself and Thangam Debbonaire. According to Onwurah, Corbyn did not communicate this change to either MP directly or tell Debbonaire when he reversed his decision, leaving them in limbo as to their precise responsibilities. Moreover, he refused requests for clarification. A spokesman for Corbyn's office, disputing the lack of "negotiation" in January, said "at no point was anyone sacked. We regret that Chi feels she was singled out, but this was clearly not the case. Chi Onwurah's comments relate to a discussion about the delineation of shadow cabinet roles last January, as is not uncommon in both shadow cabinets and cabinets."

Onwurah noted that the confusion affected two of the ethnic minority, female MPs (out of a 5% total), and argued that employment law required private sector managers to be considerably more sensitive and responsive in handling comparable situations. She stated: "If this had been any of my previous employers in the public and private sectors, Jeremy might well have found himself before an industrial tribunal for constructive dismissal, probably with racial discrimination thrown in". Onwurah later wrote that "I made no accusation of racism against Jeremy", after claims had been made of her "playing the race card".

==== 2016 Labour leadership election ====
Onwurah backed Owen Smith in the 2016 Labour leadership election, but remained a Labour frontbencher. In August 2016, during the Labour leadership campaign she publicly supported Owen Smith's calls for a second referendum on the UK's EU membership.

=== General elections and legislative career ===
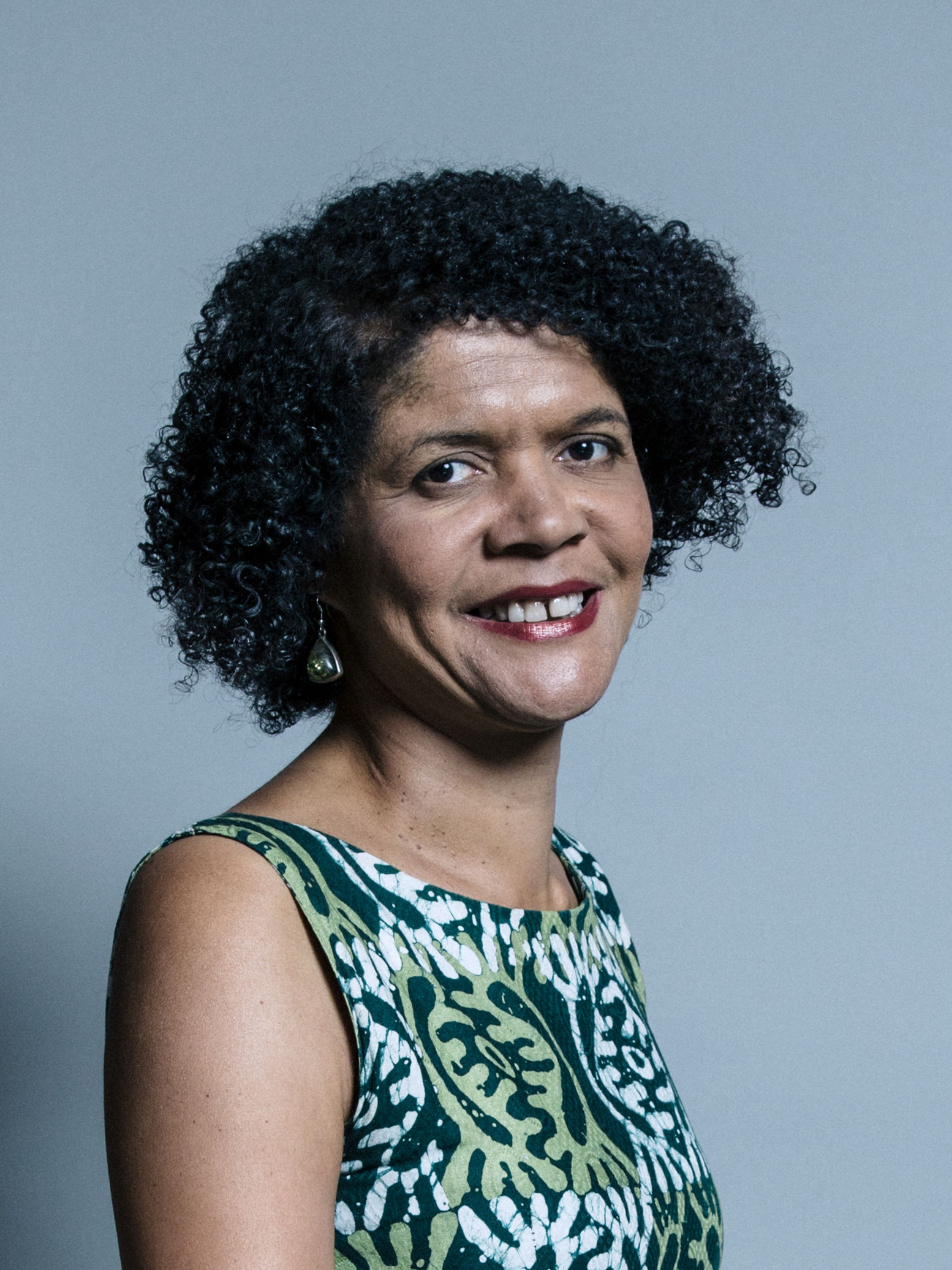
Official parliamentary portrait, 2017

Onwurah retained her seat at the 2017 general election, increasing Labour's share of the vote to 65%. Newcastle Upon Tyne Central was the first constituency to declare a result at the general election that year.

She was re-elected at the 2019 general election, and again, Newcastle Upon Tyne Central was the first seat in the United Kingdom to be declared. Her share of the vote fell to 57.6%, representing a majority of 12,278 votes with a swing of just under 4% to the Conservative Party.

In the 2024 general election, Onwurah's seat was abolished and she was elected for the revised seat of Newcastle upon Tyne Central and West, which includes a majority of her previous seat in addition to the suburbs on the western outskirts of Newcastle. She won the seat with 45.6% of the vote, 11,060 votes ahead of her nearest opponent, Reform UK.

==== Assisted dying vote ====
Onwurah’s mother was a member of the Voluntary Euthanasia Society, and she had initially assumed that when given the opportunity, she would vote in favour of voluntary assisted dying. However, in November 2024, she wrote to constituents stating she would oppose the Terminally Ill Adults (End of Life) Bill, expressing concerns that the bill was "flawed" and that there had been insufficient time for comprehensive parliamentary scrutiny.

== Personal life ==
Onwurah supports Newcastle United FC.

== Awards and honours ==
In 2018, Onwurah was added to the Computer Weekly "Most Influential Women in UK IT" Hall of Fame alongside Hannah Dee, Sarah Wood and Sherry Coutu.

In 2020, she was made an Honorary Fellow of the British Science Association.

Onwurah was appointed a Dame Commander of the Order of the British Empire (DBE) in the 2025 Birthday Honours for Political and Public Service.

== Notes ==
Parliament of the United Kingdom
Preceded by Jim Cousins	Member of Parliament for Newcastle upon Tyne Central; 2010–2024	Constituency abolished
New constituency	Member of Parliament for Newcastle upon Tyne Central and West; 2024–present	Incumbent
