= 1957 Beckenham by-election =

UK Parliamentary by-election

The 1957 Beckenham by-election was held on 21 March 1957. It was called when the incumbent Conservative MP Patrick Buchan-Hepburn was elevated to a hereditary peerage. The seat was held for the Conservatives by their candidate Philip Goodhart. Future Prime Minister Margaret Thatcher was one of the unsuccessful candidates for the Conservative nomination.

Beckenham by-election, 1957
Party	Candidate	Votes	%	±%
Conservative	Philip Goodhart	29,621	62.94	−6.02
Labour	Neville D. Sandelson	17,445	37.06	+6.02
Majority		12,176	25.87	−12.06
Turnout		47,066	64.70	−11.81
Registered electors		72,786		
Conservative hold		Swing	-6.0	
