= David Clelland =

British Labour Party politician

David Clelland MP

Lord Commissioner of the Treasury
- In office 6 February 2001 – 11 June 2001
- Prime Minister: Tony Blair
- Chancellor: Gordon Brown
- Preceded by: Bob Ainsworth
- Succeeded by: Ian Pearson (2002)

Member of Parliament for Tyne Bridge
- In office 5 December 1985 – 12 April 2010
- Preceded by: Harry Cowans
- Succeeded by: Constituency abolished

Personal details
- Born: 27 June 1943 (age 82) Gateshead, County Durham, England
- Party: Labour
- Spouse(s): Maureen Potts (married 1965, separated 1998, died 2007), Brenda Graham (married 2005)
- Children: 2 from first marriage

David Gordon Clelland MP (born 27 June 1943) is a British Labour Party politician. He served as Member of Parliament (MP) for Tyne Bridge from the 1985 by-election until the 2010 general election.

== Early life ==
Clelland was born in Gateshead and educated locally at the Kelvin Grove Boys' School (now a primary school) and the Gateshead and Hebburn Technical College. After leaving education in 1959 he was an electrical fitter for Reyrolle in Hebburn for twenty-two years from 1964. He was elected as a councillor in the Metropolitan Borough of Gateshead in 1972 and became its leader in 1984.

== Parliamentary career ==
Clelland was selected to contest the 1985 Tyne Bridge by-election, one of the then-safest Labour seats in the country, which had become vacant following the death of the MP Harry Cowans. Clelland retained the seat at the by-election on 5 December 1985 with a majority of 6,575. At the by-election, he defeated Rod Kenyon and Jacqui Lait, the latter of whom became a two-time Conservative Member of Parliament.

In Parliament, Clelland served on the Home Affairs Select Committee from 1986 until he joined the Energy Select Committee for a year in 1989. He became an opposition whip in 1995 under the leadership of Tony Blair and was made an Assistant Government Whip in office following the 1997 general election. He was promoted to become a Lord Commissioner to the Treasury, a 'full' whip, in January 2001.

He ceased being a whip following the 2001 general election, and became a member of the Office of the Deputy Prime Minister Select Committee, until 2005. Following the 2005 general election he became a member of the Transport Select Committee. In 2002, he was appointed an advisor to the Minister of Sport Richard Caborn on greyhound racing.

Clelland attracted controversy in 2008 for reply to a letter from a disgruntled constituent. The constituent, Gary Scott, wrote to Clelland accusing him of following the views of the Labour Party and not those of his constituents. Clelland responded by saying: "Given your rude and offensive manner I accept your offer not to vote for me again - if indeed you ever have - I do not want your vote so you can stick it where it best pleases you".

Following boundary changes, the seat of Tyne Bridge was abolished and replaced by a new seat Gateshead for the 2010 general election. Following a close fought contest with Sharon Hodgson, the sitting MP for Gateshead East and Washington West, Clelland was chosen to fight the new seat at the next election for the Labour Party. With an election soon due, on 26 January 2010, Clelland announced that he would stand down at the 2010 general election. Hodgson was selected for the adjoining new seat of Washington and Sunderland West, and a new Parliamentary candidate, Gateshead councillor Ian Mearns, was selected and won the seat of Gateshead for the Labour Party.

== Personal life ==
David Clelland married Maureen Potts on 31 March 1965 in Gateshead, with whom he had two children and four grandchildren. In 1998 they separated after Clelland had an affair with his secretary, Brenda Graham, whom he later married in 2005. Maureen Clelland died in May 2007.

He also recorded the Alex Glasgow song "The Socialist ABC" on the CD From Tees to Tyne, saying "I've been singing this song as a party piece for years, but I was surprised and delighted when the people from The Northumbria Anthology asked me to record it".
