= Bob Stewart (politician) =

British politician (born 1949)

Colonel The Right Honourable Bob Stewart DSO
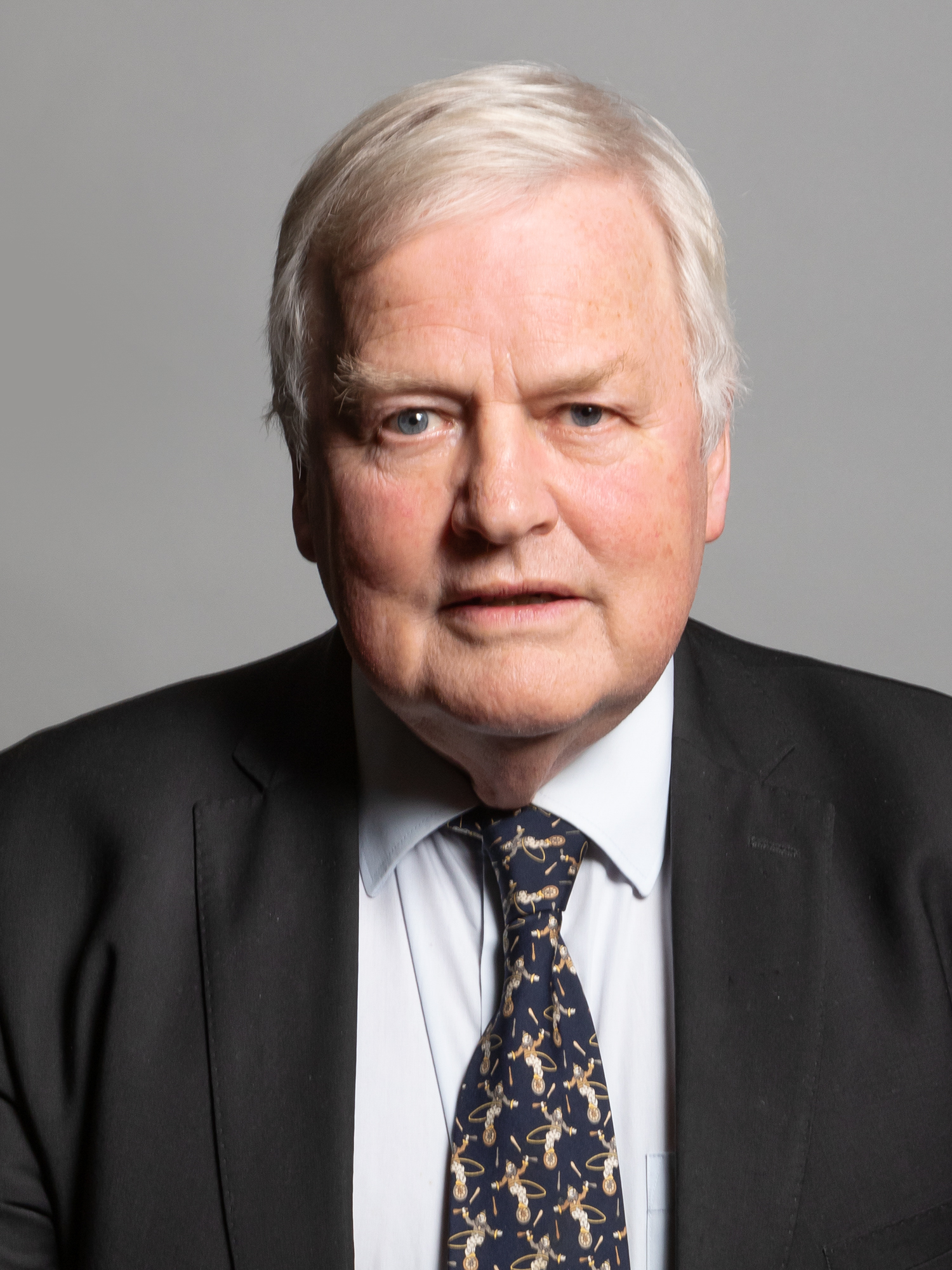
- Official portrait, 2020

Member of Parliament for Beckenham
- In office 6 May 2010 – 30 May 2024
- Preceded by: Jacqui Lait
- Succeeded by: Constituency abolished

Personal details
- Born: Robert Alexander Stewart; 7 July 1949 (age 77) Preston, Lancashire, England
- Party: Conservative
- Spouse: Claire Podbielski
- Children: 6
- Education: Royal Military Academy Sandhurst
- Website: Official website

Military service
- Allegiance: United Kingdom
- Branch/service: British Army
- Years of service: 1967–1996
- Rank: Colonel
- Commands: 1st Battalion, Cheshire Regiment
- Battles/wars: The Troubles; Operation Banner; Bosnian War; Operation Grapple
- Awards: Distinguished Service Order
- Service number: 487588

Colonel Robert Alexander Stewart DSO (born 7 July 1949) is a British politician and former soldier. He was the member of Parliament (MP) for Beckenham from 2010 to 2024. A member of the Conservative Party, he also is a former British Army officer and United Nations commander in Bosnia, commentator, author and public speaker.

== Early life ==
Stewart was born on 7 July 1949 to a father serving in the military. He was privately educated at Chigwell School, followed by the Royal Military Academy Sandhurst near Camberley in Surrey. He spent part of his childhood in Cyprus.

== Military career ==
Stewart was accepted for officer training at the age of seventeen, and after two years of training at the Royal Military Academy Sandhurst, was commissioned into the Cheshire Regiment as a second lieutenant on 25 July 1969. His service number was 487588. He was promoted to lieutenant on 25 January 1971. In 1974 he undertook an in-service Bachelor's degree in International Politics at the University College of Wales, Aberystwyth, graduating with first class honours. He was promoted captain on 25 July 1975.

=== Career in Northern Ireland ===
From 1977 Stewart served in Northern Ireland both as intelligence officer and, after attending Staff College, Camberley and promotion to major on 30 September 1981, company commander of A Company 1st Battalion Cheshire Regiment, with an intermediate period spent at Sandhurst as an instructor. During his time in Northern Ireland he was the Incident Commander at the Droppin Well bombing in Ballykelly which killed seventeen people. Stewart heard the explosion and arrived at the scene two or three minutes later. Six of the dead soldiers were from his company, including his clerk and storeman. He received a personal commendation from the general commanding in Northern Ireland for his actions on the day.

In 2017 Stewart spoke of using and authorising now forbidden deep-interrogation techniques during his time in Northern Ireland.

=== Bosnia ===
Stewart served in the Ministry of Defence, and was second-in-command of an infantry battalion. He was promoted lieutenant colonel on 31 December 1987, and served as a military attaché to the NATO military committee in Brussels. In March 1991 he assumed command of the 1st Battalion, Cheshire Regiment, and as commanding officer returned to Northern Ireland for a further two operational tours and then became the first British Commander of United Nations forces in Bosnia from September 1992 to May 1993. It was as commanding officer in Bosnia, as part of Operation Grapple, that he earned the nickname "Bosnia Bob" and became something of a media personality.

During his time in Bosnia he discovered the Ahmići massacre in which 103 people had been killed. He was awarded the Distinguished Service Order on 12 June 1993 on his return to the United Kingdom. His citation highlighted his "gallant and distinguished service" in the former Republic of Yugoslavia, emphasised his ability to maintain operational control, motivate troops and manage crises in a volatile environment where eight of his soldiers were killed and over 50 wounded. He was promoted colonel on 31 December 1993, and went on to take up the position of Chief of Policy at Supreme Headquarters Allied Powers Europe, before officially retiring from the army on 1 February 1996.

== Career after the army ==
In 1997 Stewart took three weeks' leave from the public relations company Hill & Knowlton to help his friend Martin Bell who was standing for Parliament in Tatton as an Independent candidate. Stewart was alongside Bell when they were confronted by the sitting Conservative Member of Parliament for the constituency, Neil Hamilton and his wife Christine on Knutsford Heath. Bell, who was opposing Hamilton as a result of accusations that Hamilton had accepted money for promoting causes in Parliament, gave Stewart the credit for defining his criticism of Hamilton as having already admitted to "conduct unbecoming".

In 2006, he presented the British tv show At War With Next Door.

Since leaving the army Stewart has become a well-known commentator upon military and political affairs, frequently commenting upon the defence policy of the British Government and the wars in Afghanistan and Iraq. In 2009 he condemned the system compensating injured soldiers, accusing the MOD of acting with "the speed of a striking sloth". He also accused the government of repeatedly refusing the requests of army commanders for more troops and more helicopters in Afghanistan.

== Political career ==
On 28 July 2009, it was revealed that Stewart had been approved to put himself forward for selection to constituency associations as a PPC for the Conservative Party. As the former commander of the Cheshire Regiment he was linked to the safe Conservative East Cheshire seats of Macclesfield and Congleton, however the final shortlists for Macclesfield and for Congleton from Conservative Central Office did not contain his name. In summer 2009 he was shortlisted for Beckenham, one of the safest Conservative seats in the country, and on 6 December it was announced that he had been selected as Conservative candidate there, winning an overall majority on the second ballot.

At the 2010 general election, Stewart was elected as the new MP for Beckenham. He won 57.9% of the vote, a decrease of 1.8%, and won a majority of 17,784, an increase from 8,401 at the 2005 general election.

In 2013, Stewart voted against same-sex marriage and called on the then Prime Minister David Cameron to drop the proposal. Five years later in May 2018 he apologised unreservedly in the House of Commons chamber for voting against same-sex marriage, after he had seen "the joy" it had brought to the lives of same-sex couples. In 2019, he voted to extend same-sex marriage to couples in Northern Ireland.

Stewart served on the House of Commons Defence Select Committee and in May 2014 he was one of seven unsuccessful candidates for the chairmanship of the committee.

Stewart has been vocal in criticising cuts to the defence budget, suggesting in March 2015, that if the Joint Chiefs of Staff were to resign over the issue it would "make a very powerful message". When asked if he would resign as an MP himself, he said that he was considering it.

Stewart was re-elected at the 2015 general election with an increased majority of 18,471 and a decreased vote share of 57.3%.

In 2016, Stewart was criticised after it was revealed he had described Isabel Hardman, The Spectator's assistant editor, as "totty". He later apologised to the journalist, but went on to publicly defend himself against an environment that he described as overly 'politically correct'. In November 2017, Stewart countered sexual harassment allegations saying "I'm not sleazy or drunk".

Stewart's seat was a target seat for the Liberal Democrats at both the 2017 and 2019 general election, following his open support of Brexit. At the snap 2017 general election, Stewart held his seat with a vote share increased by 2%, but with a decreased majority of 15,087. At the 2019 general election, Stewart was re-elected with a decreased vote share of 54.0% and a decreased majority of 14,258.

In the House of Commons Stewart sat on the Northern Ireland Affairs Committee and had previously sat on the Committees on Arms Export Controls and Defence Sub-Committee.

Stewart employed his wife as a part-time, Senior Parliamentary Assistant. MPs who were first elected in 2017 have been banned from employing family members, the restriction is not retrospective – meaning that Stewart's employment of his wife was allowed.

During a 2018 interview with Russia Today that followed the Stoneman Douglas High School shooting, Stewart suggested that teachers in American high schools may have to be armed.

In March 2020, Stewart was accused of fuelling xenophobia after he described COVID-19 as a "foul Chinese illness" in a Facebook post. Stewart said: "My grandfather died of Spanish flu in 1919 and I used the word Chinese Flu in respect of where the virus originated. As a constituent emailed me and thought I was being rude about the Chinese I deleted the word 'Chinese' because that was not my intention."

He is a Sino-sceptic who co-chaired the British-Taiwanese all-party parliamentary group along with Lord Rogan.

In July 2021, Stewart was one of five Conservative MPs found by the Commons Select Committee on Standards to have breached the code of conduct by writing to the Lord Chief Justice to try to influence a judge not to release character statements made by ordinary members of the public – former constituents of the former Conservative MP Charlie Elphicke, who had previously been found guilty of three counts of sexual assault and sentenced to two years in prison. Stewart reportedly wrote to the judge saying Elphicke's sentence should take into account his hard work as an MP, and described his crimes as "folly". On 22 July 2021, Stewart made a personal statement in the House of Commons apologising.

In November 2023, Stewart announced that he would not be seeking re-election at the 2024 general election.

== Public order prosecution and appeal ==
In December 2022, Stewart was captured on video in an exchange with Bahraini human rights activist Sayed Alwadaei, who was stripped of his nationality by the government there, outside a reception hosted by the Bahraini embassy in London. Alwadaei challenged Stewart, asking him, "Did you sell yourself to the Bahraini regime?" In response, Stewart said that Bahrain was "a great place", adding "Go back to Bahrain" and "You're taking money off my country, go away." Stewart later apologised for his remarks, but said he was "taunted" and had not taken money from Bahrain. Alwadaei submitted a letter of complaint to the Conservative Party, alleging that Stewart had brought the party into disrepute and victimised him because of his race or nationality.

Following a police investigation, the Crown Prosecution Service authorised the Metropolitan Police to charge Stewart with two offences under section 5 of the Public Order Act 1986, including racially aggravated abuse "and in the alternative, a non-aggravated section 5 offence under the same Act." Stewart pleaded not guilty at Westminster Magistrates' Court on 19 July.

On 3 November 2023, Stewart was found guilty of a racially aggravated public order offence, fined £600, and ordered to pay costs. He surrendered the Conservative Party whip in the Commons pending an appeal against his conviction.

On 23 February 2024, Stewart successfully appealed his conviction and had the offence overturned at Southwark Crown Court. Mr Justice Bennathan found that while Stewart's comments did amount to abuse, the complainant had not suffered upset, alarm or distress and by his own admission had not heard all of Stewart's comments during their heated exchange.

== Publications ==
- Broken Lives: Personal View of the Bosnian Conflict ISBN 978-0-00-638268-3
- Leadership Under Pressure: Tactics from the Front Line ISBN 978-0-7494-5655-9
- Both Feet In: A Soldier and MP’s Story of Duty, Loyalty and Staying True to Your Word ASIN: B0H1DD148R

== Personal life ==
Stewart lives in Beckenham in London and in 1994 he married his second wife, Claire Podbielski, a Red Cross worker he met in Bosnia while serving in the military. He has six children, 4 of which are with Claire. He was married to his first wife for 20 years.

== Honours ==

Ribbon	Description	Notes
	Distinguished Service Order (DSO)	12 June 1993.
	General Service Medal	With "NORTHERN IRELAND" Clasp
	United Nations Medal	UNPROFOR; 90 Days Campaign Service on United Nations Mission
	Accumulated Campaign Service Medal	36 Months Campaign Service

- He was sworn in as a member of Her Majesty's Most Honourable Privy Council on 10 March 2021 at Windsor Castle. This entitled him to the honorific prefix "The Right Honourable" for life.

== See also ==
- Bosnian War
- United Nations Peacekeeping
- United Nations Protection Force

Parliament of the United Kingdom
Preceded by Jacqui Lait	Member of Parliament for Beckenham; 2010–2024	Constituency abolished
