= Lyall Wilkes =

British politician

Lyall Wilkes (19 May 1914 – 28 March 1991) was an English historian, circuit judge and Labour Party politician.

== Biography ==
A noted barrister and later judge in the North-East of England, Wilkes was a member of Broad Chare Chambers, a leading group of barristers in the area. A prolific writer, notably of biographies, his works included books on the lives of William Eden, Francis Festing and John Dobson.

As a politician Wilkes won the Newcastle upon Tyne Central seat from Arthur Denville in the 1945 general election and held the seat until he left politics in 1951.

Following his death in 1991 Wilkes was buried in St. Mary Magdalene's Church Whalton.

Parliament of the United Kingdom
| Preceded by Arthur Denville | Member of Parliament for Newcastle upon Tyne Central; 1945–1951 | Succeeded by Ted Short |
