= Jim Cousins =

British politician (born 1944)

Member of Parliament for Newcastle upon Tyne Central
- In office 11 June 1987 – 12 April 2010
- Preceded by: Piers Merchant
- Succeeded by: Chi Onwurah

Personal details
- Born: 23 February 1944 (age 82) Shepherd's Bush, London
- Party: Labour
- Spouse: Anne Elizabeth
- Children: 2
- Education: New College, Oxford; London School of Economics

James Mackay Cousins (born 23 February 1944) is an English Labour Party politician who was the Member of Parliament (MP) for Newcastle upon Tyne Central from 1987 to 2010.

== Early life ==
Cousins was educated at the City of London School, New College, Oxford and the LSE. While at Oxford University, Cousins was a leading member of the university's Liberal Club. During the 1960s, he authored a pamphlet rejecting the "new" Labour of the Harold Wilson era. From 1967 to 1972 he worked in industrial relations and as a research worker in industry. From 1972 to 1982 he was a research worker in Urban Affairs and City Labour Markets. From 1982 to 1987, he was a lecturer at Sunderland Polytechnic.

== Parliamentary career ==
On the party's rebel left, Cousins briefly served on the party's front bench in a foreign affairs portfolio before being stripped of his position along with fellow frontbencher Ann Clwyd in 1995. The two MPs had been on a fact-finding tour of Kurdistan, at that time being ravaged by Iraqi dictator Saddam Hussein, and failed to return in time for a crucial Commons vote. As a key ally of the then Shadow Foreign Secretary Robin Cook, Cousins was still hopeful of a ministerial job when Labour won the election in 1997, but his hopes were dashed and instead he became an influential member of the backbench Treasury Select Committee.

Although Cousins has been described as a member of Labour's so-called awkward squad, his politics and indeed his personality are in reality more complex. He voted against the war in Iraq in 2003 and opposed the introduction of tuition fees in 2004, but on other matters - such as Tony Blair's reforms of the National Health Service, he remained loyal.

The Liberal Democrats made a determined effort to target Cousins' Newcastle Central constituency in the 2005 general election, having taken control of Newcastle City Council the previous year, and Cousins saw his majority reduce from 11,605 to under 4,000. While unsuccessful in defeating Cousins, this result represented one of the largest swings in the country, possibly attributed to Liberal Democrat candidate Greg Stone's student-oriented campaign which focused on issues such as the 2003 invasion of Iraq and Top-up fees. In June 2009, Cousins announced that he would not be fighting to maintain his seat in the House of Commons at the next general election citing the health of his wife as the reason.

== Personal life ==
He is married to Anne Elizabeth. They have two sons, and a stepson and step daughter.

Parliament of the United Kingdom
Preceded by Piers Merchant	Member of Parliament for Newcastle upon Tyne Central; 1987 – 2010	Succeeded by Chi Onwurah
