= 1971 Labour Party deputy leadership election =

UK political party election

- 10–17 November 1971
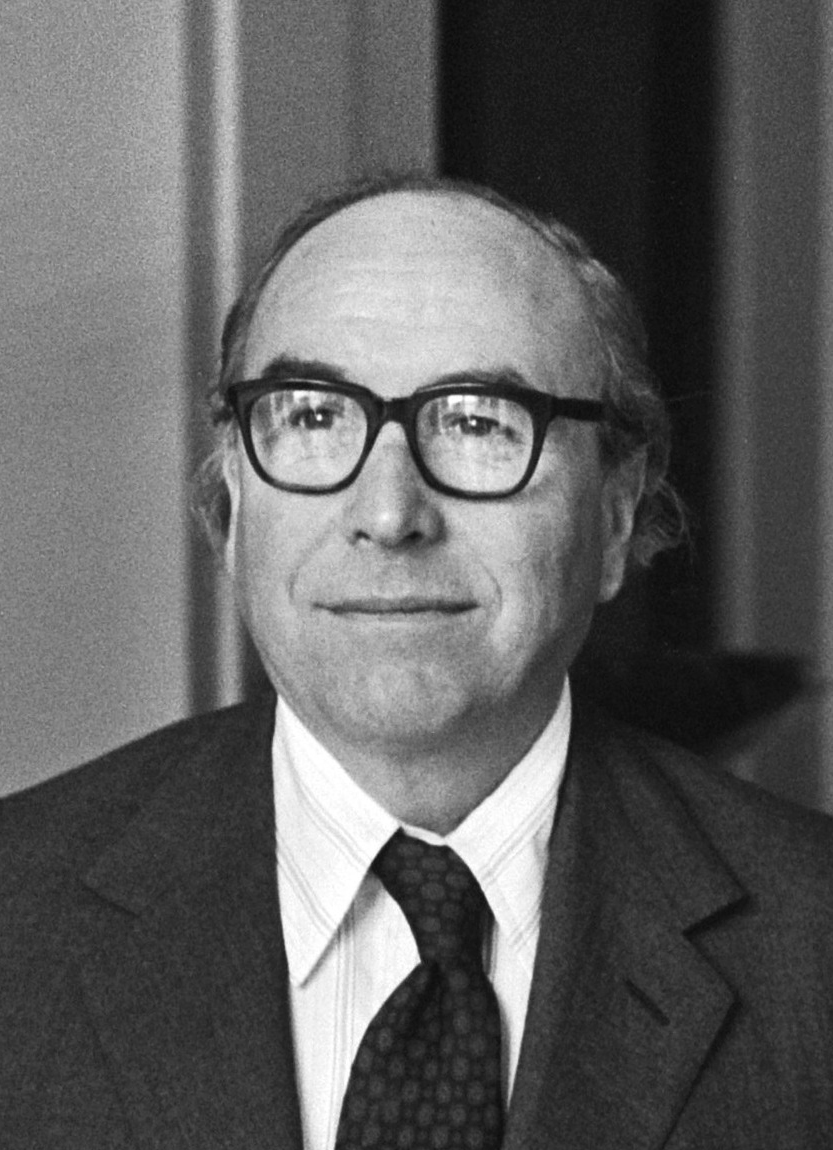

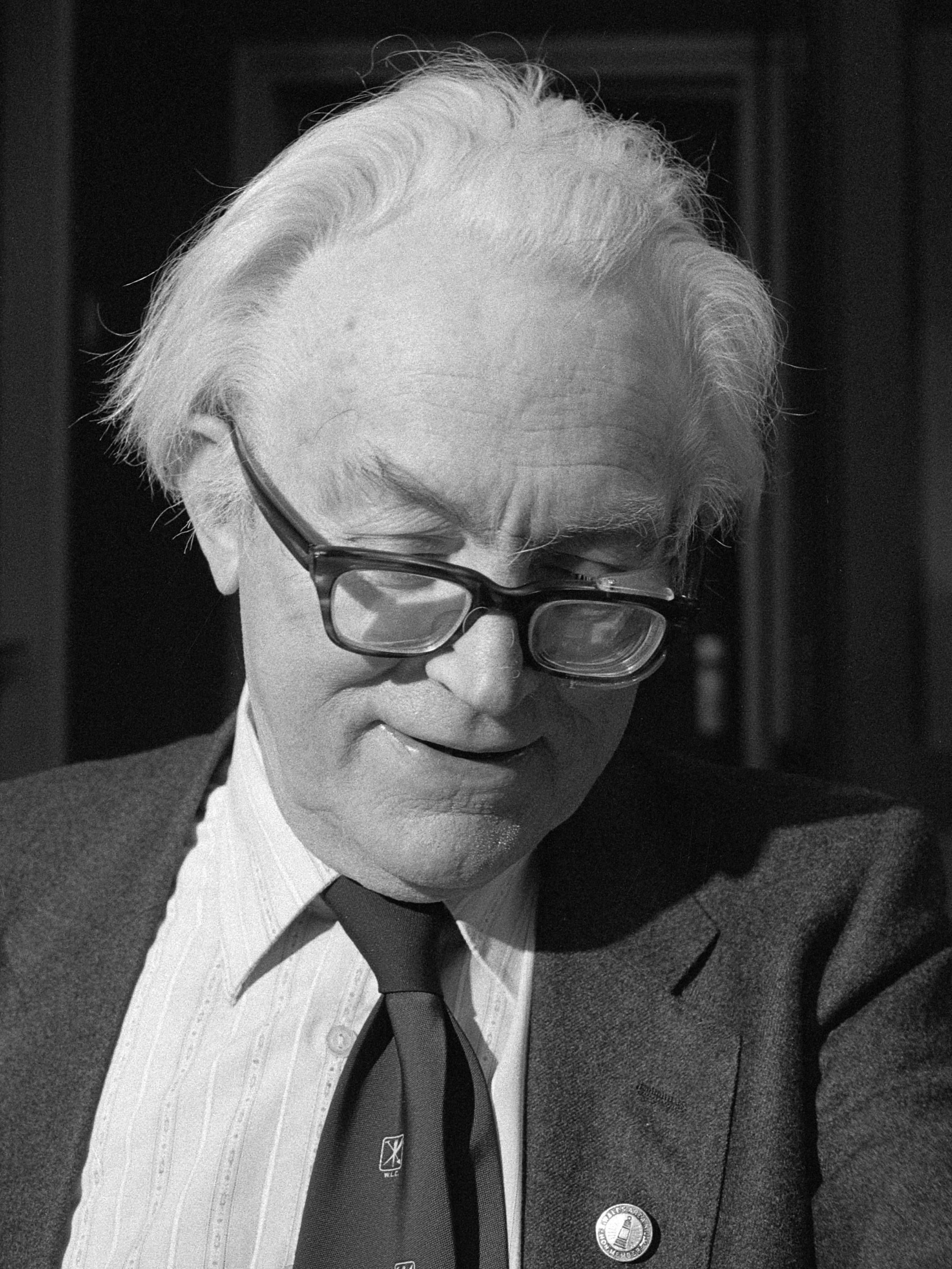

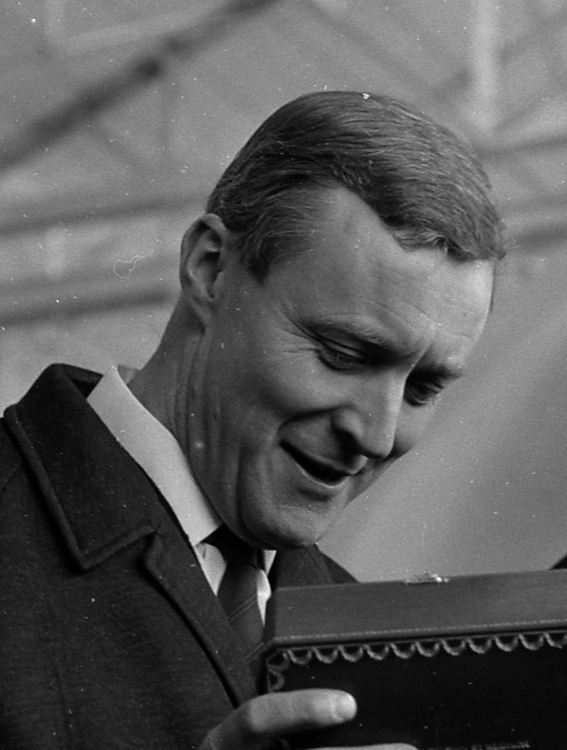
Candidate	Roy Jenkins	Michael Foot	Tony Benn
First ballot	140 (48.3%)	96 (38.0%)	46 (16.3%)
Second ballot	140 (52.6%)	126 (47.4%)	Eliminated
Deputy Leader before election
Roy Jenkins
Elected Deputy Leader
Roy Jenkins

The 1971 Labour Party deputy leadership election took place in November 1971 after left-wingers Michael Foot and Tony Benn challenged sitting deputy leader Roy Jenkins.

== Candidates ==
- Roy Jenkins, incumbent Deputy Leader, Member of Parliament for Birmingham Stechford
- Michael Foot, Shadow Leader of the House of Commons, Member of Parliament for Ebbw Vale
- Tony Benn, Shadow Secretary of State for Trade and Industry, Member of Parliament for Bristol East

== Results ==
First ballot: 10 November 1971
Candidate	Votes	%
Roy Jenkins	140	48.3
Michael Foot	96	38.0
Tony Benn	46	16.3
Second ballot required

As a result of the first round, Benn was eliminated. The remaining two candidates were left to face each other in a second round a week later.

Second ballot: 17 November 1971
Candidate	Votes	%
Roy Jenkins	140	52.6
Michael Foot	126	47.4
Roy Jenkins re-elected

== Sources ==
- http://privatewww.essex.ac.uk/~tquinn/labour_party_deputy.htm
