= Newcastle upon Tyne Central =

Parliamentary constituency in the United Kingdom, 1918–2024

- Former borough constituency for the House of Commons
- 2010–2024 boundary of Newcastle upon Tyne Central in Tyne and Wear

- Location of Tyne and Wear within England
- County: Tyne and Wear
- Electorate: 60,795 (December 2010)
- Major settlements: Newcastle upon Tyne

1918–2024
- Seats: One
- Created from: Newcastle-upon-Tyne
- Replaced by: Newcastle upon Tyne Central and West; Newcastle upon Tyne North (minor part)

Newcastle upon Tyne Central was a constituency represented in the House of Commons of the UK Parliament from 2010 until its abolition for the 2024 general election by Chi Onwurah of the Labour Party. As with all constituencies since 1950, the constituency elected one Member of Parliament (MP) by the first past the post system of election at least every five years.

Under the 2023 periodic review of Westminster constituencies, the majority of the seat was included in the new constituency of Newcastle upon Tyne Central and West.

== History ==
Parliament created this seat under the Representation of the People Act 1918 for the general election later that year. It was one of four divisions of the parliamentary borough of Newcastle-upon-Tyne, which had previously been represented by one two-member seat.

The constituency covered the central part of Newcastle upon Tyne, being one of three constituencies in the city. Between 1983 and 2010, the seat did not actually include the city's commercial centre, being instead part of the now-abolished Tyne Bridge constituency.

From its creation, the constituency was represented by only members of the Labour and Conservative parties. The seat was represented by Labour from 1987 until its abolition.

At the 2017 and 2019 general elections, the constituency was the first in the UK to officially declare its result. It narrowly beat Houghton and Sunderland South, which had declared first in 2010 and 2015 (as did its predecessor Sunderland South in the four preceding general elections), and would do so again in 2024.

== Boundaries ==
=== 1918–1950 ===
- The County Borough of Newcastle upon Tyne wards of All Saints, St John's, St Nicholas, Stephenson, and Westgate.

=== 1950–1955 ===
- The County Borough of Newcastle upon Tyne wards of Armstrong, Byker, St Anthony's, St Nicholas, and Stephenson; and
- The Rural District of Newcastle upon Tyne.

NB: the Rural District of Newcastle upon Tyne contained just a single building ('the Moot Hall and Precincts') in the centre of Newcastle.

Boundaries redrawn to take account of expansion of the County Borough and redistribution of wards. Expanded eastwards, gaining Byker and St Anthony's from Newcastle upon Tyne East, westwards, gaining Armstrong from Newcastle upon Tyne West. St John's and Westgate were transferred to Newcastle upon Tyne North. The constituency now comprised a narrow strip along the north bank of the River Tyne.

=== 1955–1983 ===
- The County Borough of Newcastle upon Tyne wards of Armstrong, Benwell, Byker, St Anthony's, St Nicholas, and Stephenson; and
- The Rural District of Newcastle upon Tyne.

Benwell ward transferred from Newcastle upon Tyne West.

1983–1997

- The City of Newcastle upon Tyne wards of Blakelaw, Fenham, Jesmond, Kenton, Moorside, South Gosforth, and Wingrove.

Following the reorganisation of local authorities as a result of the Local Government Act 1972, the constituencies within the City of Newcastle upon Tyne were completely redrawn. The contents of the newly constituted seat comprised only a small area common to the previous version. The central and western areas of the old seat, including Benwell and the city centre, were incorporated into the new constituency of Tyne Bridge, which included parts of Gateshead Borough on the south side of the River Tyne. Byker and St Anthony's were returned to Newcastle upon Tyne East, along with the Battle Field area.

The new version of the constituency absorbed the whole of the existing Newcastle upon Tyne North seat, apart from Sandyford. It also included parts of the now abolished Newcastle upon Tyne West constituency (Fenham and Kenton) and a small area transferred from Wallsend (South Gosforth).

=== 1997–2010 ===
- The City of Newcastle upon Tyne wards of Blakelaw, Fenham, Jesmond, Kenton, Moorside, Sandyford, South Gosforth, and Wingrove.

Sandyford ward transferred from Newcastle upon Tyne East, which was now abolished.

=== 2010–2024 ===
Map of 2010–2024 boundaries
- The City of Newcastle upon Tyne wards of Benwell and Scotswood, Blakelaw, Elswick, Fenham, Kenton, Westgate, West Gosforth, and Wingrove.

Following its review of parliamentary representation in Tyne and Wear in 2007, which took effect at the 2010 general election, the Boundary Commission for England moved the Sandyford area back to the re-created constituency of Newcastle upon Tyne East, together with the suburb of Jesmond. Those areas north of the River Tyne in the now abolished Tyne Bridge constituency (Benwell, Scotswood, Elswick and the city centre) were transferred in.

== Constituency profile ==
The constituency contained the city centre and surrounding suburbs. Previously based around heavy industry, such as shipbuilding, its adult population had mostly lower or middle incomes. The economy is now mainly focused on services and tourism. In November 2012 total unemployment (based on the more up-to-date claimant statistics) placed the constituency in joint 17th place of 29 constituencies in the region, above, for example the City of Durham at the bottom of the list, with just 3.4% claimants whereas Newcastle had 6.0% claimants, identical to Sunderland Central.

== Members of Parliament ==
Election	Member	Party
1918	George Renwick	Conservative
1922	Charles Trevelyan	Labour
1931	Arthur Denville	Conservative
1945	Lyall Wilkes	Labour
1951	Ted Short	Labour
1976 by-election	Harry Cowans	Labour
1983	Piers Merchant	Conservative
1987	Jim Cousins	Labour
2010	Chi Onwurah	Labour
2024	Constituency abolished	

== Election results 1918-2024 ==
=== Election in the 1910s ===
General election 1918: Newcastle-upon-Tyne Central
Party		Candidate	Votes	%	±%
C	Unionist	George Renwick	9,414	65.4	
	Labour	James Smith	4,976	34.6	
Majority			4,438	30.8	
Turnout			14,390	43.9	
Registered electors			32,796		
	Unionist win (new seat)				
C indicates candidate endorsed by the coalition government.

=== Elections in the 1920s ===
Trevelyan

General election 1922: Newcastle-upon-Tyne Central
Party	Candidate	Votes	%	±%
Labour	Charles Trevelyan	13,709	54.2	+17.6
Unionist	George Renwick	8,639	34.2	−31.2
Liberal	John Dodd	2,923	11.6	New
Majority		5,070	20.0	N/A
Turnout		25,271	72.5	+28.6
Registered electors		34,844		
Labour gain from Unionist		Swing	+24.4	

General election 1923: Newcastle-upon-Tyne Central
Party	Candidate	Votes	%	±%
Labour	Charles Trevelyan	12,447	52.5	−1.7
Unionist	Francis Fisher	11,260	47.5	+13.3
Majority		1,187	5.0	−15.0
Turnout		23,707	67.4	−5.1
Registered electors		35,193		
Labour hold		Swing	-7.5	

General election 1924: Newcastle-upon-Tyne Central
Party	Candidate	Votes	%	±%
Labour	Charles Trevelyan	14,542	51.6	−0.9
Unionist	F.M.B. Fisher	13,646	48.4	+0.9
Majority		896	3.2	−1.8
Turnout		28,188	79.8	+12.4
Registered electors		35,307		
Labour hold		Swing	-0.9	

General election 1929: Newcastle-upon-Tyne Central
Party	Candidate	Votes	%	±%
Labour	Charles Trevelyan	17,580	57.2	+5.6
Unionist	Richard Wyndham-Quin	13,161	42.8	−5.6
Majority		4,419	14.4	+11.2
Turnout		30,740	73.7	−6.1
Registered electors		41,683		
Labour hold		Swing	+5.6	

=== Elections in the 1930s ===
General election 1931: Newcastle upon Tyne Central
Party	Candidate	Votes	%	±%
Conservative	Arthur Denville	20,309	62.4	+19.6
Ind. Labour Party	Charles Trevelyan	12,136	37.3	−19.9
National Labour	W.H.D. Caple	94	0.3	New
Majority		8,173	25.1	N/A
Turnout		32,539	80.5	+6.8
Conservative gain from Labour		Swing		

General election 1935: Newcastle upon Tyne Central
Party	Candidate	Votes	%	±%
Conservative	Arthur Denville	15,826	59.3	−3.1
Labour	Walter Monslow	10,871	40.7	New
Majority		4,955	18.6	−6.5
Turnout		26,697	75.5	−5.0
Conservative hold		Swing		

=== Elections in the 1940s ===
General election 1945: Newcastle upon Tyne Central
Party	Candidate	Votes	%	±%
Labour	Lyall Wilkes	10,627	61.9	+21.2
Conservative	Arthur Denville	6,536	38.1	−21.2
Majority		4,091	23.8	N/A
Turnout		17,163	71.8	−3.7
Labour gain from Conservative		Swing		

=== Elections in the 1950s ===
General election 1950: Newcastle upon Tyne Central
Party	Candidate	Votes	%	±%
Labour	Lyall Wilkes	25,190	63.7	+1.8
Conservative	George Campbell White	13,567	34.3	+25.2
Ind. Labour Party	Fred Barton	812	2.1	New
Majority		11,623	29.4	+5.6
Turnout		39,569	79.8	+8.0
Labour hold		Swing		

General election 1951: Newcastle upon Tyne Central
Party	Candidate	Votes	%	±%
Labour	Ted Short	25,637	64.1	+0.4
Conservative	Frederick Talbot Webster	13,325	33.3	−1.0
Ind. Labour Party	Fred Barton	1,006	2.5	+0.4
Majority		12,312	30.8	+1.4
Turnout		39,968	80.7	+0.9
Labour hold		Swing		

General election 1955: Newcastle upon Tyne Central
Party	Candidate	Votes	%	±%
Labour	Ted Short	26,102	66.6	+2.5
Conservative	George Peters	13,099	33.4	+0.1
Majority		13,003	33.2	+2.4
Turnout		39,201	70.88	−8.8
Labour hold		Swing		

General election 1959: Newcastle upon Tyne Central
Party	Candidate	Votes	%	±%
Labour	Ted Short	24,051	65.8	−0.8
Conservative	William D Rutter	12,485	34.2	+0.8
Majority		11,566	31.6	−1.6
Turnout		36,536	73.2	+2.3
Labour hold		Swing		

=== Elections in the 1960s ===
General election 1964: Newcastle upon Tyne Central
Party	Candidate	Votes	%	±%
Labour	Ted Short	20,547	70.9	+5.1
Conservative	William D Rutter	7,896	27.3	−6.9
Communist	Thomas G Welch	532	1.8	New
Majority		12,651	43.6	+12.0
Turnout		28,975	69.13	−4.1
Labour hold		Swing		

General election 1966: Newcastle upon Tyne Central
Party	Candidate	Votes	%	±%
Labour	Ted Short	19,291	76.7	+5.8
Conservative	John J. Walker-Smith	5,474	21.6	−5.7
Communist	Thomas G. Welch	404	1.6	−0.2
Majority		13,817	54.9	+11.3
Turnout		25,169	65.8	−3.3
Labour hold		Swing		

=== Elections in the 1970s ===
General election 1970: Newcastle upon Tyne Central
Party	Candidate	Votes	%	±%
Labour	Ted Short	13,671	70.6	−6.1
Conservative	Michael St John Way	4,256	22.0	+0.4
Liberal	David Lesser	1,433	7.4	New
Majority		9,415	48.6	−6.3
Turnout		19,360	61.6	−4.2
Labour hold		Swing		

General election February 1974: Newcastle upon Tyne Central
Party	Candidate	Votes	%	±%
Labour	Ted Short	12,182	74.5	+3.9
Conservative	Michael Jack	4,180	25.5	+3.5
Majority		8,002	49.0	+0.4
Turnout		16,362	65.4	+3.8
Labour hold		Swing	+0.2	

General election October 1974: Newcastle upon Tyne Central
Party	Candidate	Votes	%	±%
Labour	Ted Short	10,540	71.8	−2.7
Conservative	Sheila Faith	2,432	16.6	−9.0
Liberal	Andrew Stephen Ellis	1,716	11.7	New
Majority		8,108	55.2	+6.2
Turnout		14,694	58.4	−7.0
Labour hold		Swing	+3.1	

1976 Newcastle-upon-Tyne Central by-election
Party	Candidate	Votes	%	±%
Labour	Harry Cowans	4,692	47.6	−24.2
Liberal	Andrew Stephen Ellis	2,854	29.0	+17.3
Conservative	Richard Sowler	1,945	19.7	+3.2
Socialist Workers	David Hayes	184	1.9	New
National Front	Bruce Anderson-Lynes	181	1.8	New
Majority		1,838	18.65	−36.6
Turnout		9,856		
Labour hold		Swing		

General election 1979: Newcastle upon Tyne Central
Party	Candidate	Votes	%	±%
Labour	Harry Cowans	10,395	67.3	−4.5
Conservative	Piers Merchant	2,982	19.3	+2.8
Liberal	Andrew Steven Ellis	2,073	13.4	+1.7
Majority		7,413	48.0	−7.2
Turnout		15,450	65.25	+6.8
Labour hold		Swing	−3.6	

=== Elections in the 1980s ===
General election 1983: Newcastle upon Tyne Central
Party	Candidate	Votes	%	±%
Conservative	Piers Merchant	18,161	40.8	
Labour	Nigel Todd	15,933	35.8	
SDP	John Horam	9,923	22.3	New
Ecology	Douglas Jacques	478	1.1	New
Majority		2,228	5.0	
Turnout		44,495	71.0	
Conservative win (new boundaries)				

General election 1987: Newcastle upon Tyne Central
Party	Candidate	Votes	%	±%
Labour	Jim Cousins	20,416	44.2	+8.4
Conservative	Piers Merchant	17,933	38.8	−2.0
SDP	Nigel Martin	7,304	15.8	−6.5
Green	Richard Bird	418	0.9	−0.2
Red Front	Kirk Williams	111	0.2	New
Majority		2,483	5.4	N/A
Turnout		46,182	75.5	+4.5
Labour gain from Conservative		Swing	+5.2	

=== Elections in the 1990s ===
General election 1992: Newcastle upon Tyne Central
Party	Candidate	Votes	%	±%
Labour	Jim Cousins	21,123	49.4	+5.2
Conservative	Mike Summersby	15,835	37.0	−1.8
Liberal Democrats	Lembit Öpik	5,816	13.6	−2.2
Majority		5,288	12.4	+7.0
Turnout		42,774	71.3	−4.2
Labour hold		Swing	+3.5	

General election 1997: Newcastle upon Tyne Central
Party	Candidate	Votes	%	±%
Labour	Jim Cousins	27,272	59.2	+7.5
Conservative	Brooks Newmark	10,792	23.4	−12.2
Liberal Democrats	Ruth Berry	6,911	15.0	+2.3
Referendum	Charles A. Coxon	1,113	2.4	New
Majority		16,480	35.8	+19.7
Turnout		46,088	65.9	−5.4
Labour hold		Swing	+9.9	

=== Elections in the 2000s ===
General election 2001: Newcastle upon Tyne Central
Party	Candidate	Votes	%	±%
Labour	Jim Cousins	19,169	55.0	−4.2
Liberal Democrats	Stephen Psallidas	7,564	21.7	+6.7
Conservative	Aidan Ruff	7,414	21.3	−2.1
Socialist Labour	Gordon Potts	723	2.1	New
Majority		11,605	33.3	−2.5
Turnout		34,870	51.3	−14.6
Labour hold		Swing	−5.5	

General election 2005: Newcastle upon Tyne Central
Party	Candidate	Votes	%	±%
Labour	Jim Cousins	16,211	45.1	−9.9
Liberal Democrats	Greg Stone	12,229	34.0	+12.3
Conservative	Wendy Morton	5,749	16.0	−5.3
Green	Joe Hulm	1,254	3.5	New
Newcastle Academy with Christian Values Party	Clive Harding	477	1.3	New
Majority		3,982	11.1	−22.2
Turnout		35,920	52.5	+1.2
Labour hold		Swing	-11.1	

=== Elections in the 2010s ===
General election 2010: Newcastle upon Tyne Central
Party	Candidate	Votes	%	±%
Labour	Chi Onwurah	15,692	45.9	−4.6
Liberal Democrats	Gareth Kane	8,228	24.1	−3.4
Conservative	Nick Holder	6,611	19.4	+2.8
BNP	Ken Booth	2,302	6.7	New
UKIP	Martin Davies	754	2.2	New
Green	John Pearson	568	1.7	−2.2
Majority		7,464	21.8	−1.2
Turnout		34,155	56.5	+4.0
Labour hold		Swing	−0.6	

General election 2015: Newcastle upon Tyne Central
Party	Candidate	Votes	%	±%
Labour	Chi Onwurah	19,301	55.0	+9.1
Conservative	Simon Kitchen	6,628	18.9	−0.5
UKIP	Daniel Thompson	5,214	14.9	+12.7
Liberal Democrats	Nick Cott	2,218	6.3	−17.8
Green	Alex Johnson	1,724	4.9	+3.2
Majority		12,673	36.1	+14.3
Turnout		35,085	60.3	+3.8
Labour hold		Swing	+4.8	

General election 2017: Newcastle upon Tyne Central
Party	Candidate	Votes	%	±%
Labour	Chi Onwurah	24,071	64.9	+9.9
Conservative	Steve Kyte	9,134	24.6	+5.7
Liberal Democrats	Nick Cott	1,812	4.9	−1.4
UKIP	David Muat	1,482	4.0	−10.9
Green	Peter Thomson	595	1.6	−3.3
Majority		14,937	40.3	+4.2
Turnout		37,094	67.0	+6.7
Labour hold		Swing	+2.1	

General election 2019: Newcastle upon Tyne Central
Party	Candidate	Votes	%	±%
Labour	Chi Onwurah	21,568	57.6	−7.3
Conservative	Emily Payne	9,290	24.8	+0.2
Liberal Democrats	Ali Avaei	2,709	7.2	+2.3
Brexit Party	Mark Frederick Griffin	2,542	6.8	New
Green	Taymar Pitman	1,365	3.6	+2.0
Majority		12,278	32.8	−7.5
Turnout		37,474	64.8	−2.2
Labour hold		Swing	−3.8	

== See also ==
- List of parliamentary constituencies in Tyne and Wear
- History of parliamentary constituencies and boundaries in Tyne and Wear
- History of parliamentary constituencies and boundaries in Northumberland
