= 1970 Labour Party deputy leadership election =

UK political party election

- 8 July 1970
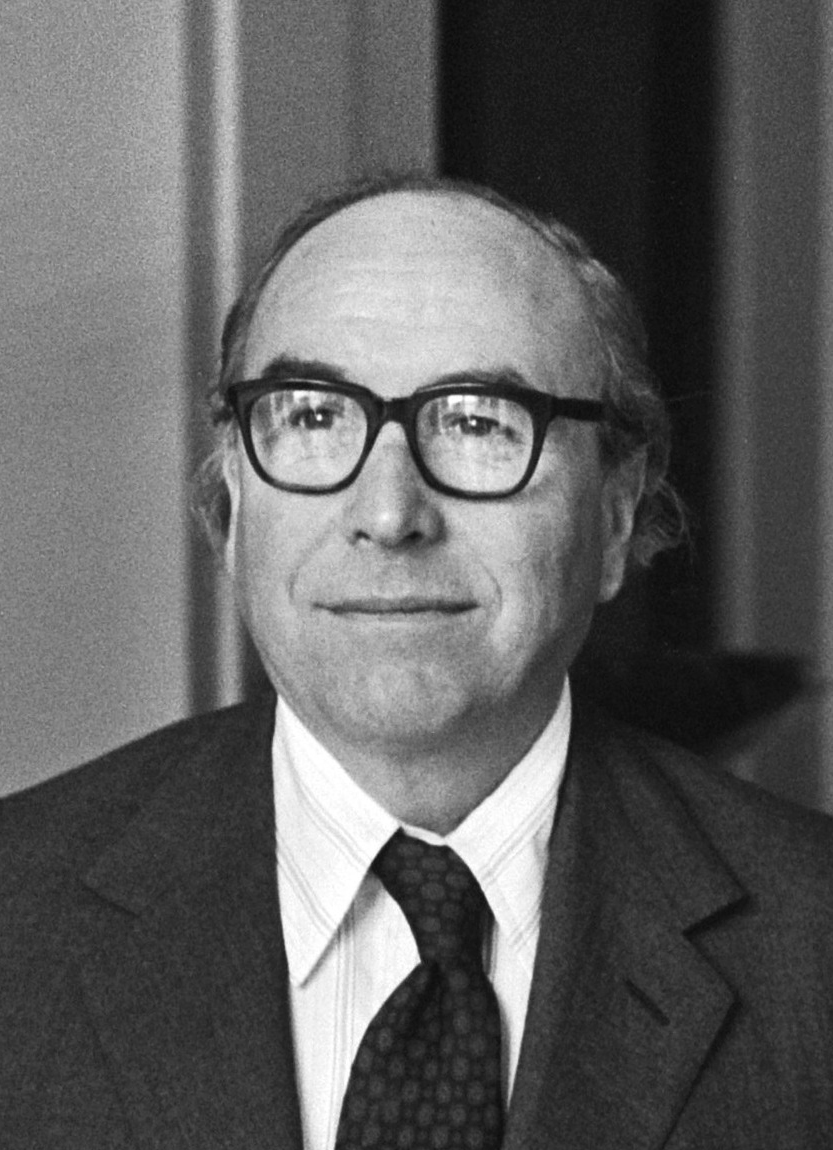

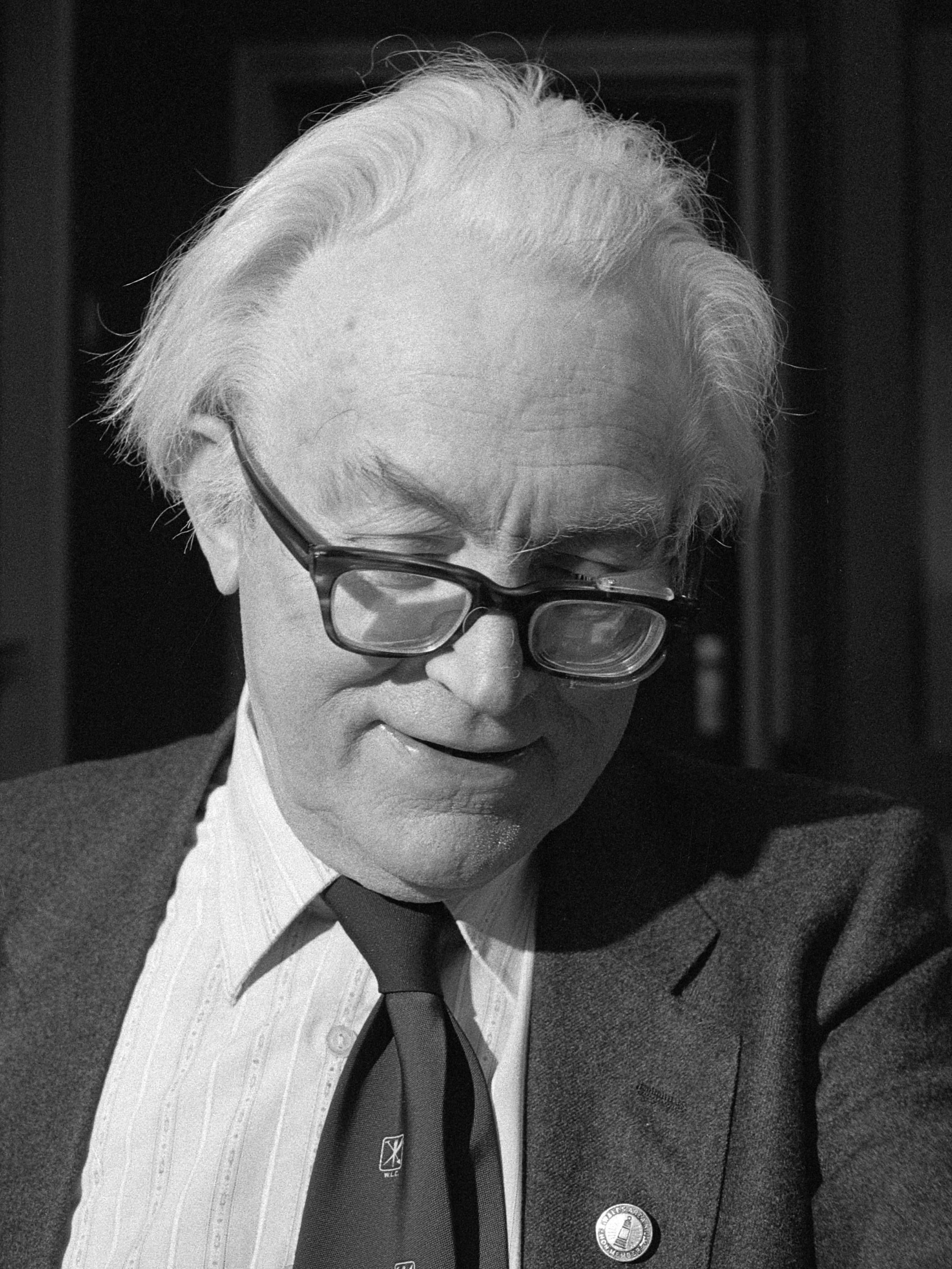

Candidate	Roy Jenkins	Michael Foot	Fred Peart
Popular vote	133	67	48
Percentage	53.6%	27.0%	19.4%
Deputy Leader before election
George Brown
Elected Deputy Leader
Roy Jenkins

The 1970 Labour Party deputy leadership election took place on 8 July 1970, after sitting deputy leader George Brown lost his seat at the 1970 general election.

== Candidates ==
- Michael Foot, Member of Parliament for Ebbw Vale
- Roy Jenkins, Shadow Chancellor of the Exchequer, Member of Parliament for Birmingham Stechford
- Fred Peart, Shadow Leader of the House of Commons, Member of Parliament for Workington

== Results ==
Only ballot: 8 July 1970
Candidate	Votes	%
Roy Jenkins	133	53.6
Michael Foot	67	27.0
Fred Peart	48	19.4
Roy Jenkins elected

== Sources ==
- http://privatewww.essex.ac.uk/~tquinn/labour_party_deputy.htm
