= 1976 Newcastle-upon-Tyne Central by-election =

UK parliamentary by-election

- 4 November 1976
Candidate	Harry Cowans	Andrew Ellis	Richard Sowler
Party	Labour	Liberal	Conservative
Popular vote	4,692	2,854	1,945
Swing	▼24.16	▲17.28	▲3.18
MP before election
Edward Short
Labour
Elected MP
Harry Cowans
Labour

A by-election was held on 4 November 1976 for the UK parliamentary constituency of Newcastle upon Tyne Central following the resignation of Labour Member of Parliament (MP) Edward Short who left to take up the position of Chairman of Cable & Wireless. Labour held the seat in the by-election.

== Result ==
1976 Newcastle upon Tyne Central by-Election
Party	Candidate	Votes	%	±%
Labour	Harry Cowans	4,692	47.61	−24.16
Liberal	Andrew Ellis	2,854	28.96	+17.28
Conservative	Richard Sowler	1,945	19.73	+3.18
Socialist Workers	David Hayes	184	1.87	New
National Front	Bruce Anderson-Lynes	181	1.84	New
Majority		1,838	18.65	−36.55
Turnout		9,856		
Labour hold		Swing		
