= 1997 Beckenham by-election =

UK parliamentary by-election

- 20 November 1997
- Turnout: 43.7%
	First party	Second party	Third party
Candidate	Jacqui Lait	Robert N. Hughes	Rosemary E. Vetterlein
Party	Conservative	Labour	Liberal Democrats
Popular vote	13,162	11,935	5,864
Percentage	41.3%	37.4%	18.4%
Swing	▼1.2 pp	▲4.0 pp	▲0.1 pp
MP before election
Piers Merchant
Conservative
Elected MP
Jacqui Lait
Conservative

A by-election for the United Kingdom parliamentary constituency of Beckenham was held on 20 November 1997, triggered by the resignation of the incumbent Conservative Party Member of Parliament (MP) Piers Merchant, who stood down following a scandal regarding his affair with a teenage bar hostess. The Conservatives held the seat, with Jacqui Lait winning the by-election.

The 1997 Winchester by-election was held on the same day.

== Background ==
Piers Merchant had been under pressure during the 1997 general election campaign earlier that year after The Sun published stories about his relationship with a 17-year-old bar hostess whom he had employed as a researcher, but he had denied any impropriety, and retained the confidence of his local association. After further newspaper stories and video footage were published which confirmed that his denial had been misleading, he resigned on 21 October 1997 by acceping the office of Crown Steward and Bailiff of the Manor of Northstead – a ceremonial procedure for Parliamentary resignations.

At the by-election, the Conservatives selected Jacqui Lait, who had lost her seat at Hastings and Rye in the general election. The Labour candidate, Robert (Bob) Hughes, was a long time resident of the constituency and had contested the seat at the general election. The Liberal Democrats also chose their general election candidate, Rosemary Vetterlein. The Conservatives were successful in retaining the seat with a further reduced majority. This was the last election (general or by-election) that the Referendum Party contested; it wound up soon afterwards.

== Result ==
Beckenham by-election, 1997
Party	Candidate	Votes	%	±%
Conservative	Jacqui Lait	13,162	41.3	–1.2
Labour	Robert N. Hughes	11,935	37.4	+4.0
Liberal Democrats	Rosemary E. Vetterlein	5,864	18.4	+0.1
Liberal	Phil H. Rimmer	330	1.0	–0.3
National Front	John C. McAuley	267	0.8	+0.1
Referendum	Leonard F. Mead	237	0.8	–2.3
Independent	John Campion	69	0.2	New
Natural Law	John D. Small	44	0.1	New
Majority		1,227	3.9	–5.2
Turnout		31,908	43.7	–30.6
Registered electors		74,019		
Conservative hold		Swing	–2.6	

== Previous result ==
General election 1997: Beckenham
Party	Candidate	Votes	%	±%
Conservative	Piers Merchant	23,084	42.5	–14.4
Labour	Robert N. Hughes	18,131	33.4	+9.6
Liberal Democrats	Rosemary E. Vetterlein	9,858	18.1	+0.7
Referendum	Leonard F. Mead	1,663	3.1	New
Liberal	Phil H. Rimmer	720	1.3	–0.1
UKIP	Christopher N. Pratt	506	0.9	New
National Front	John C. McAuley	388	0.7	New
Majority		4,953	9.1	–23.9
Turnout		54,350	74.3	–3.3
Registered electors		73,126		
Conservative hold		Swing	–15.0	
