= Beckenham (constituency) =

Parliamentary constituency in the United Kingdom, 1950-2024

Coordinates: 51.389°N 0.02°W

- Former borough constituency for the House of Commons
- Boundary of Beckenham in Greater London for the 2010 general election
- County: Greater London
- Population: 87,011 (2011 census)
- Electorate: 66,470 (December 2010)
- Borough: London Borough of Bromley

1950–2024
- Seats: One
- Created from: Bromley and Orpington
- Replaced by: Beckenham and Penge; Bromley and Biggin Hill

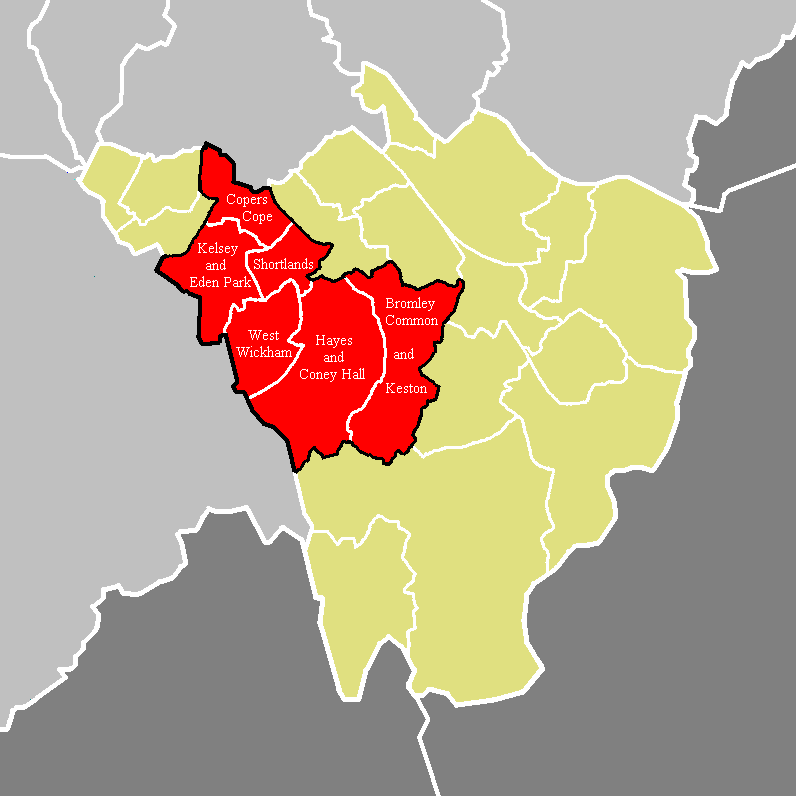
Detailed map of the post-2010 form of this Westminster seat (red) in the London Borough of Bromley (yellow)

Beckenham (/ˈbɛkənəm/) was a constituency (Note: A borough constituency (for the purposes of election expenses and type of returning officer).) in Greater London represented in the House of Commons of the UK Parliament from 2010 until its abolition for the 2024 general election by Bob Stewart, a member of the Conservative Party. (Note: As with all constituencies, the constituency elects one Member of Parliament (MP) by the first past the post system of election at least every five years.)

Under the 2023 Periodic Review of Westminster constituencies, the majority of the constituency was incorporated into the new constituency of Beckenham and Penge.

== Constituency profile ==
The constituency is mostly leafy and suburban — one widely known gazetteer summarised this in 2012:

"The properties on these streets typically include a range of styles, from modern to Mock Tudor. However many local residents are wealthy city commuters. Keston Common and Keston Ponds are both popular attractions for locals...The common theme is large, detached houses with substantial land and typically with asking prices of over £1 million. At the lower end of the market, a one bedroom period conversion flat on Turpington Lane near Bromley Common, or a one bedroom flat in a modern block on Homesdale Road, near the Bickley border, would demand an asking price of approximately £160,000."

There are significant areas of open land to the south around Hayes and Keston. The upmarket town centre of Beckenham is split between this constituency and Lewisham West and Penge to the west.

All wards have voted between 60 and 70% Conservative since the seat's inception. In times when Labour has led in the national polls the seat has remained Conservative. The smallest majority in a general election was 9.3%, in 1997; in all other elections except 2001 there have been majorities of more than 15%. The seat happened to become safer in its cut down to six wards (from ten) in 2010. This removed the three most Labour inclined wards of the borough, centered on Penge, and one other, taken from the more suburban parts that lean strongly or weakly Conservative.

Since 1983 there has been a close contest for second place between Labour and the Liberal Democrats. Labour's share has remained much greater than in Orpington whereas the Liberal Democrat share has remained much greater than in Croydon Central. (Note: Both Orpington and Croydon Central are conservative neighbouring seats.)

== History ==
The constituency had only elected Conservatives as its MPs since 1950.

The constituency shared boundaries with the Beckenham electoral division for election of councillors to the Greater London Council at elections in 1973, 1977 and 1981.

The closest the Conservatives have ever come to losing this seat was at a by-election in November 1997, at the height of Tony Blair's 'honeymoon period' as Prime Minister, following the resignation of the previous MP Piers Merchant in a sex scandal. Even then, the former MP for Hastings who lost her seat in the earlier 1997 general election, Jacqui Lait, managed to win the seat by just over 1,000 votes.

Between 1957 and 1992 the long-serving MP for Beckenham was Sir Philip Goodhart, who was soon after 1979 discovered by Margaret Thatcher to be a right-of-centre or 'wet conservative' and consequently his career as a junior minister came to a quick end. Goodhart is best known for his book on the workings of the Conservative MPs' 1922 Committee, and for his brother Charles, who was a famous economics professor at LSE and sat for some time on the Bank of England's monetary policy committee.

Before Sir Philip Goodhart, the former Conservative Chief Whip Patrick Buchan-Hepburn represented Beckenham in Parliament.

== Boundaries ==
Map of boundaries 2010–2024

| Dates | Local authority | Maps | Wards |
|---|---|---|---|
| 1950–1974 | Municipal Borough of Beckenham; Penge Urban District (before 1965); London Borough of Bromley (after 1965) | | The Municipal Borough of Beckenham, and the Urban District of Penge. |
| 1974–1983 | London Borough of Bromley | | Anerley, Clock House, Copers Cope, Eden Park, Lawrie Park and Kent House, Manor House, Penge and Shortlands. |
| 1983–1997 | London Borough of Bromley | | Anerley, Clock House, Copers Cope, Eden Park, Kelsey Park, Lawrie Park and Kent House, Penge and Shortlands. |
| 1997–2010 | London Borough of Bromley | | Anerley, Clock House, Copers Cope, Eden Park, Kelsey Park, Lawrie Park and Kent House, Penge, Shortlands, West Wickham North and West Wickham South. |
| 2010–2024 | London Borough of Bromley | | Bromley Common and Keston, Copers Cope, Hayes and Coney Hall, Kelsey and Eden Park, Shortlands and West Wickham. |

Despite the changes in ward names, the 1974–1983 boundaries and the 1983–1997 boundaries are almost exactly the same boundaries. Similarly, despite the changes in local authorities and the listing of wards, the 1950–1974 boundaries and the 1997–2010 boundaries are almost exactly the same.

Beckenham constituency covers the northwestern part of the London Borough of Bromley. The local government ward boundaries were redrawn for the 2002 local elections, though this did not affect parliamentary limits until the 2010 general election.

=== Pre-2010 boundary review ===
Following their review of parliamentary representation in South London, the Boundary Commission for England made revisions to this seat. Clock House ward, Crystal Palace ward, and Penge and Cator ward were transferred from Beckenham to help create the new constituency of Lewisham West and Penge. Parts of Bromley Common and Keston, Hayes and Coney Hall, and Shortlands wards were transferred to Beckenham from Bromley and Chislehurst. A small part of Bromley Common and Keston ward was transferred to Beckenham from Orpington and a tiny part of Bromley Town ward was transferred from Beckenham to Bromley and Chislehurst.

=== Abolition ===
Under the 2023 Periodic Review of Westminster constituencies, the constituency underwent major boundary changes, with eastern areas, comprising the Bromley Common and Keston, and Hayes and Coney Hall wards, being transferred to the new constituency of Bromley and Biggin Hill. To compensate, "Penge" (comprising the Clock House, Crystal Palace, and Penge and Cator wards) was transferred back from the now abolished seat of Lewisham West and Penge. Accordingly, the seat was renamed Beckenham and Penge, first contested at the 2024 general election. With the new boundary changes it was notionally a marginal seat but was won by Liam Conlon for Labour with a majority of 12,905.

== Members of Parliament ==
| Election | Member | Party |
|---|---|---|
| 1950 | Patrick Buchan-Hepburn | Conservative |
| 1957 by-election | Philip Goodhart | Conservative |
| 1992 | Piers Merchant | Conservative |
| 1997 by-election | Jacqui Lait | Conservative |
| 2010 | Bob Stewart | Conservative |
| 2023 | Bob Stewart | Independent |
| 2024 | Bob Stewart | Conservative |

== Elections ==
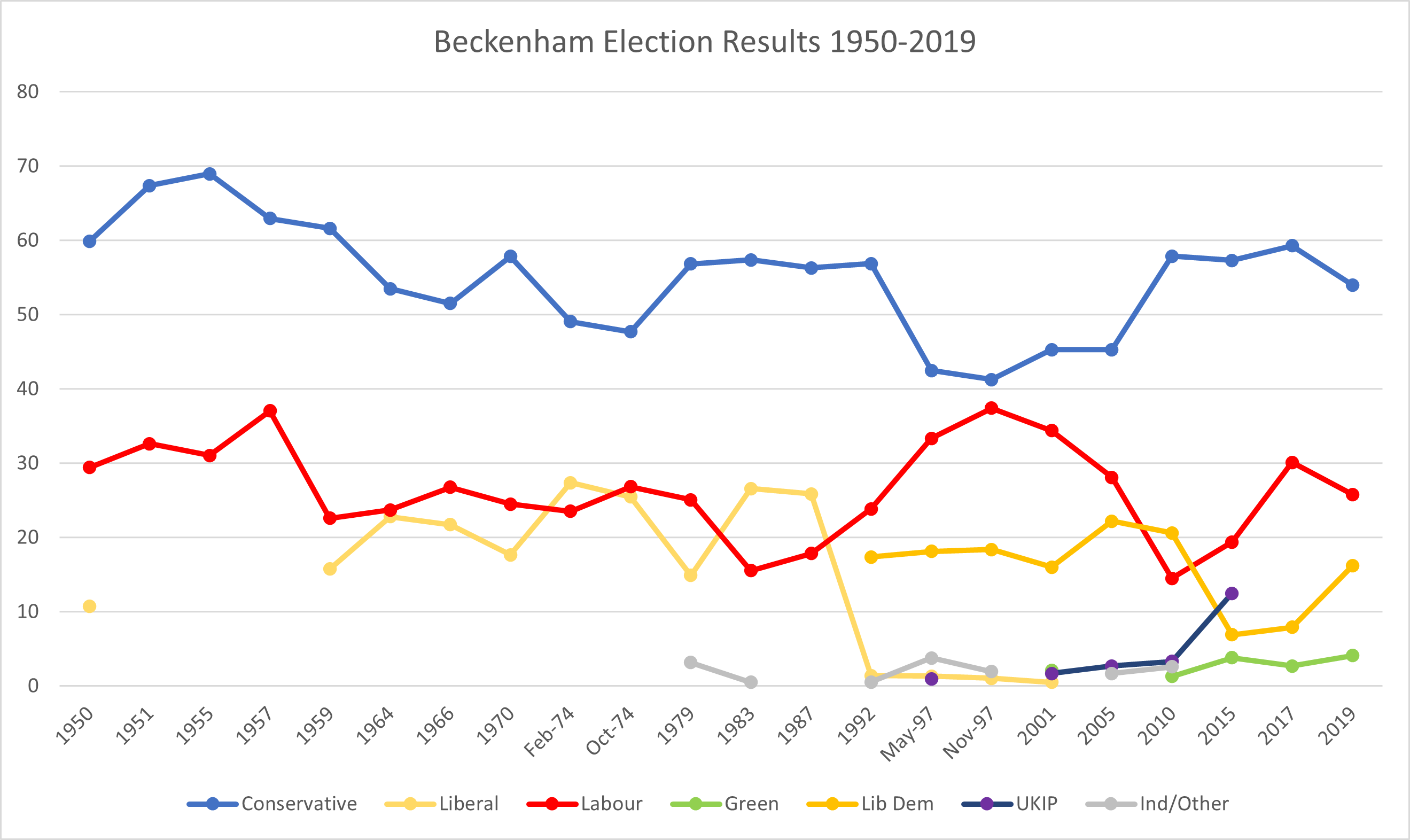

=== Elections in the 2010s ===
General election 2019: Beckenham
| Party | Candidate | Votes | % | ±% |
|---|---|---|---|---|
| Conservative | Bob Stewart | 27,282 | 54.0 | −5.3 |
| Labour | Marina Ahmad | 13,024 | 25.8 | −4.3 |
| Liberal Democrats | Chloe-Jane Ross | 8,194 | 16.2 | +8.3 |
| Green | Ruth Fabricant | 2,055 | 4.1 | +1.4 |
| Majority | | 14,258 | 28.2 | −1.0 |
| Turnout | | 50,555 | 73.6 | −2.4 |
| Registered electors | | 68,671 | | |
| Conservative hold | | Swing | −0.5 | |

General election 2017: Beckenham
| Party | Candidate | Votes | % | ±% |
|---|---|---|---|---|
| Conservative | Bob Stewart | 30,632 | 59.3 | +2.0 |
| Labour | Marina Ahmad | 15,545 | 30.1 | +10.7 |
| Liberal Democrats | Julie Ireland | 4,073 | 7.9 | +1.0 |
| Green | Ruth Fabricant | 1,380 | 2.7 | −1.1 |
| Majority | | 15,087 | 29.2 | −8.7 |
| Turnout | | 51,630 | 76.0 | +2.8 |
| Registered electors | | 67,925 | | |
| Conservative hold | | Swing | −4.3 | |

General election 2015: Beckenham
| Party | Candidate | Votes | % | ±% |
|---|---|---|---|---|
| Conservative | Bob Stewart | 27,955 | 57.3 | −0.6 |
| Labour | Marina Ahmad | 9,484 | 19.4 | +4.9 |
| UKIP | Rob Bryant | 6,108 | 12.5 | +9.2 |
| Liberal Democrats | Anuja Prashar | 3,378 | 6.9 | −13.7 |
| Green | Ruth Fabricant | 1,878 | 3.8 | +2.5 |
| Majority | | 18,471 | 37.9 | +0.6 |
| Turnout | | 48,803 | 73.2 | +1.2 |
| Registered electors | | 67,439 | | |
| Conservative hold | | Swing | +6.6 | |

General election 2010: Beckenham
| Party | Candidate | Votes | % | ±% |
|---|---|---|---|---|
| Conservative | Bob Stewart | 27,597 | 57.9 | −1.2 |
| Liberal Democrats | Stephen Jenkins | 9,813 | 20.6 | +5.5 |
| Labour | Damien Egan | 6,893 | 14.5 | −7.3 |
| UKIP | Owen Brolly | 1,551 | 3.3 | +0.8 |
| BNP | Roger Tonks | 1,001 | 2.1 | New |
| Green | Ann Garrett | 608 | 1.3 | New |
| English Democrat | Dan Eastgate | 223 | 0.5 | New |
| Majority | | 17,784 | 37.3 | +20.1 |
| Turnout | | 47,686 | 72.0 | +6.7 |
| Registered electors | | 66,219 | | |
| Conservative hold | | Swing | −3.3 | |

=== Elections in the 2000s ===
2005 notional result
| Party | Vote | % |
|---|---|---|
| Conservative | 24,596 | 59.1 |
| Labour | 9,040 | 21.7 |
| Liberal Democrats | 6,287 | 15.1 |
| Others | 1,705 | 4.1 |
| Turnout | 41,628 | 65.3 |
| Electorate | 63,738 | |

General election 2005: Beckenham
| Party | Candidate | Votes | % | ±% |
|---|---|---|---|---|
| Conservative | Jacqui Lait | 22,183 | 45.3 | +0.1 |
| Labour | Liam Curran | 13,782 | 28.1 | −6.1 |
| Liberal Democrats | Jef Foulger | 10,862 | 22.2 | +6.1 |
| UKIP | James Cartwright | 1,301 | 2.7 | +0.9 |
| Independent | Roderick Reed | 836 | 1.7 | New |
| Majority | | 8,401 | 17.2 | +6.3 |
| Turnout | | 48,964 | 65.5 | +2.9 |
| Registered electors | | 74,706 | | |
| Conservative hold | | Swing | +3.1 | |

General election 2001: Beckenham
| Party | Candidate | Votes | % | ±% |
|---|---|---|---|---|
| Conservative | Jacqui Lait | 20,618 | 45.3 | +2.8 |
| Labour | Richard Watts | 15,659 | 34.4 | +1.0 |
| Liberal Democrats | Alexander Feakes | 7,308 | 16.0 | −2.1 |
| Green | Karen Moran | 961 | 2.1 | New |
| UKIP | Christopher Pratt | 782 | 1.7 | +0.8 |
| Liberal | Rif Winfield | 234 | 0.5 | −0.8 |
| Majority | | 4,959 | 10.9 | +1.8 |
| Turnout | | 45,562 | 62.6 | −12.0 |
| Registered electors | | 72,772 | | |
| Conservative hold | | Swing | +0.9 | |

=== Elections in the 1990s ===
1997 Beckenham by-election
| Party | Candidate | Votes | % | ±% |
|---|---|---|---|---|
| Conservative | Jacqui Lait | 13,162 | 41.2 | −1.2 |
| Labour | Robert Hughes | 11,935 | 37.4 | +4.0 |
| Liberal Democrats | Rosemary Vetterlein | 5,864 | 18.4 | +0.2 |
| Liberal | Phil Rimmer | 330 | 1.0 | −0.3 |
| National Front | John McAuley | 267 | 0.8 | +0.1 |
| Referendum | Leonard Mead | 237 | 0.7 | −2.3 |
| Independent | John Campion | 69 | 0.2 | New |
| Natural Law | John Small | 44 | 0.1 | New |
| Majority | | 1,227 | 3.8 | −5.3 |
| Turnout | | 31,908 | 43.6 | −31.1 |
| Registered electors | | 73,127 | | |
| Conservative hold | | Swing | −2.6 | |

General election 1997: Beckenham
| Party | Candidate | Votes | % | ±% |
|---|---|---|---|---|
| Conservative | Piers Merchant | 23,084 | 42.5 | −17.7 |
| Labour | Robert Hughes | 18,131 | 33.4 | +12.2 |
| Liberal Democrats | Rosemary Vetterlein | 9,858 | 18.1 | +1.4 |
| Referendum | Leonard Mead | 1,663 | 3.1 | New |
| Liberal | Phil Rimmer | 720 | 1.3 | −0.1 |
| UKIP | Christopher Pratt | 506 | 0.9 | New |
| National Front | John McAuley | 388 | 0.7 | New |
| Majority | | 4,953 | 9.1 | −29.9 |
| Turnout | | 54,350 | 74.7 | −2.8 |
| Registered electors | | 72,807 | | |
| Conservative hold | | Swing | −15.0 | |

1992 notional result
| Party | Vote | % |
|---|---|---|
| Conservative | 35,154 | 60.2 |
| Labour | 12,341 | 21.1 |
| Liberal Democrats | 9,765 | 16.7 |
| Others | 1,153 | 3.2 |
| Turnout | 58,413 | 77.5 |
| Electorate | 75,388 | |

General election 1992: Beckenham
| Party | Candidate | Votes | % | ±% |
|---|---|---|---|---|
| Conservative | Piers Merchant | 26,323 | 56.9 | +0.6 |
| Labour | Ken Ritchie | 11,038 | 23.9 | +6.1 |
| Liberal Democrats | Mary Williams | 8,038 | 17.4 | −8.5 |
| Liberal | Gerry Williams | 643 | 1.4 | New |
| Natural Law | Patrick Shaw | 243 | 0.5 | New |
| Majority | | 15,285 | 33.0 | +2.6 |
| Turnout | | 46,285 | 77.9 | +5.0 |
| Registered electors | | 59,440 | | |
| Conservative hold | | Swing | −2.7 | |

=== Elections in the 1980s ===
General election 1987: Beckenham
| Party | Candidate | Votes | % | ±% |
|---|---|---|---|---|
| Conservative | Philip Goodhart | 24,903 | 56.3 | −1.1 |
| Liberal | Colin Darracot | 11,439 | 25.9 | −0.7 |
| Labour | Ken Ritchie | 7,888 | 17.8 | +2.3 |
| Majority | | 13,464 | 30.4 | −0.4 |
| Turnout | | 44,230 | 72.8 | +3.5 |
| Registered electors | | 60,718 | | |
| Conservative hold | | Swing | −0.2 | |

General election 1983: Beckenham
| Party | Candidate | Votes | % | ±% |
|---|---|---|---|---|
| Conservative | Philip Goodhart | 23,606 | 57.4 | +0.5 |
| Liberal | Christina Forrest | 10,936 | 26.6 | +11.7 |
| Labour | Jim Dowd | 6,386 | 15.5 | −9.5 |
| BNP | Geoffrey Younger | 203 | 0.5 | New |
| Majority | | 12,670 | 30.8 | −1.1 |
| Turnout | | 41,131 | 69.3 | −5.4 |
| Registered electors | | 59,384 | | |
| Conservative hold | | Swing | −5.6 | |

=== Elections in the 1970s ===
1979 notional result
| Party | Vote | % |
|---|---|---|
| Conservative | 24,761 | 56.9 |
| Labour | 10,872 | 25.0 |
| Liberal | 6,488 | 14.9 |
| Others | 1,371 | 3.2 |
| Turnout | 43,492 | |
| Electorate | | |

General election 1979: Beckenham
| Party | Candidate | Votes | % | ±% |
|---|---|---|---|---|
| Conservative | Philip Goodhart | 24,607 | 56.9 | +9.2 |
| Labour | Jonathan Mordecai | 10,856 | 25.1 | −1.8 |
| Liberal | Christina Forrest | 6,450 | 14.9 | −10.6 |
| Ecology | Wilfred Vernon | 762 | 1.8 | New |
| National Front | Nigel Dickson | 606 | 1.4 | New |
| Majority | | 13,751 | 31.8 | +10.9 |
| Turnout | | 43,281 | 74.7 | +4.9 |
| Registered electors | | 57,939 | | |
| Conservative hold | | Swing | +5.5 | |

General election October 1974: Beckenham
| Party | Candidate | Votes | % | ±% |
|---|---|---|---|---|
| Conservative | Philip Goodhart | 19,798 | 47.7 | −1.4 |
| Labour | Nicholas Sharp | 11,140 | 26.8 | +3.3 |
| Liberal | Graham Mitchell | 10,578 | 25.5 | −1.9 |
| Majority | | 8,658 | 20.9 | −0.8 |
| Turnout | | 41,516 | 69.8 | −9.6 |
| Registered electors | | 59,497 | | |
| Conservative hold | | Swing | −2.3 | |

General election February 1974: Beckenham
| Party | Candidate | Votes | % | ±% |
|---|---|---|---|---|
| Conservative | Philip Goodhart | 22,976 | 49.1 | −6.7 |
| Liberal | Graham Mitchell | 12,821 | 27.4 | +11.3 |
| Labour | Nicholas Sharp | 11,018 | 23.5 | −4.6 |
| Majority | | 10,155 | 21.7 | −18.0 |
| Turnout | | 46,815 | 79.4 | +11.0 |
| Registered electors | | 58,995 | | |
| Conservative hold | | Swing | −9.0 | |

1970 notional result
| Party | Vote | % |
|---|---|---|
| Conservative | 23,200 | 55.8 |
| Labour | 11,700 | 28.1 |
| Liberal | 6,700 | 16.1 |
| Turnout | 41,600 | 68.4 |
| Electorate | 60,857 | |

General election 1970: Beckenham
| Party | Candidate | Votes | % | ±% |
|---|---|---|---|---|
| Conservative | Philip Goodhart | 30,763 | 57.8 | +6.3 |
| Labour | Inigo Bing | 13,031 | 24.5 | −2.3 |
| Liberal | Philip Golding | 9,404 | 17.7 | −4.0 |
| Majority | | 17,732 | 33.3 | +8.6 |
| Turnout | | 53,198 | 68.7 | −9.0 |
| Registered electors | | 77,385 | | |
| Conservative hold | | Swing | +4.3 | |

=== Elections in the 1960s ===
General election 1966: Beckenham
| Party | Candidate | Votes | % | ±% |
|---|---|---|---|---|
| Conservative | Philip Goodhart | 28,837 | 51.5 | −2.0 |
| Labour | John Grant | 14,972 | 26.8 | +3.0 |
| Liberal | Philip Golding | 12,155 | 21.7 | −1.1 |
| Majority | | 13,865 | 24.8 | −5.0 |
| Turnout | | 55,964 | 77.8 | +0.4 |
| Registered electors | | 71,952 | | |
| Conservative hold | | Swing | −2.5 | |

General election 1964: Beckenham
| Party | Candidate | Votes | % | ±% |
|---|---|---|---|---|
| Conservative | Philip Goodhart | 30,070 | 53.5 | −8.1 |
| Labour | Alistair Macdonald | 13,338 | 23.7 | +1.1 |
| Liberal | Hubert Monroe | 12,821 | 22.8 | +7.0 |
| Majority | | 16,732 | 29.8 | −9.3 |
| Turnout | | 56,229 | 77.4 | −3.4 |
| Registered electors | | 72,692 | | |
| Conservative hold | | Swing | −4.6 | |

=== Elections in the 1950s ===
General election 1959: Beckenham
| Party | Candidate | Votes | % | ±% |
|---|---|---|---|---|
| Conservative | Philip Goodhart | 36,528 | 61.6 | −7.4 |
| Labour | Herbert Ferguson | 13,395 | 22.6 | −8.4 |
| Liberal | Hubert Monroe | 9,365 | 15.8 | New |
| Majority | | 23,133 | 39.0 | +1.1 |
| Turnout | | 59,288 | 80.8 | +4.2 |
| Registered electors | | 73,421 | | |
| Conservative hold | | Swing | +0.5 | |

1957 Beckenham by-election
| Party | Candidate | Votes | % | ±% |
|---|---|---|---|---|
| Conservative | Philip Goodhart | 29,621 | 62.9 | −6.0 |
| Labour | Neville Sandelson | 17,445 | 37.1 | +6.0 |
| Majority | | 12,176 | 25.9 | −12.1 |
| Turnout | | 47,066 | 64.7 | −11.9 |
| Registered electors | | 72,786 | | |
| Conservative hold | | Swing | −6.0 | |

General election 1955: Beckenham
| Party | Candidate | Votes | % | ±% |
|---|---|---|---|---|
| Conservative | Patrick Buchan-Hepburn | 38,614 | 69.0 | +1.6 |
| Labour | Charles Culling | 17,377 | 31.0 | −1.6 |
| Majority | | 21,237 | 37.9 | +3.2 |
| Turnout | | 55,991 | 76.5 | −5.9 |
| Registered electors | | 73,177 | | |
| Conservative hold | | Swing | +1.6 | |

General election 1951: Beckenham
| Party | Candidate | Votes | % | ±% |
|---|---|---|---|---|
| Conservative | Patrick Buchan-Hepburn | 41,282 | 67.4 | +7.5 |
| Labour | A. Philip Magonet | 19,982 | 32.6 | +3.2 |
| Majority | | 21,300 | 34.8 | +4.3 |
| Turnout | | 61,264 | 82.4 | −4.1 |
| Registered electors | | 74,370 | | |
| Conservative hold | | Swing | +2.2 | |

General election 1950: Beckenham
| Party | Candidate | Votes | % |
|---|---|---|---|
| Conservative | Patrick Buchan-Hepburn | 38,102 | 59.9 |
| Labour | Alexander Bain | 18,723 | 29.4 |
| Liberal | Hubert Monroe | 6,834 | 10.7 |
| Majority | | 19,379 | 30.4 |
| Turnout | | 63,659 | 86.5 |
| Registered electors | | 73,605 | |
| Conservative win (new seat) | | | |

== See also ==
- List of parliamentary constituencies in London
