= Rod Kenyon =

British executive

Rod Kenyon OBE
- Born: Rodney Frank Kenyon; 1945
- Died: 8 December 2013 (aged 68)
- Occupation: Human Resource Director
- Known for: Gas Industry Education and Training
- Political party: SDP

Rodney Frank Kenyon (June 1945 – 8 December 2013) was a former Human Resources Director at British Gas and was director of the British Gas Engineering Academy. In 2001 he was a director of the Apprenticeship Ambassadors Network.

Kenyon was also vice chairman of Energy and Utility Skills and former chairman of Learning and Skills Council Region Council for London. Kenyon was appointed to the board of the University of West London in 2001.

He was a trustee of the National Gas Museum Trust and a director of Dyslexia Action.

Kenyon contested the UK parliamentary constituency of Houghton and Washington in the 1983 and 1987 General Elections as a Social Democrat receiving 24% and 18% share of the vote respectively. In 1985 he contested the Tyne Bridge by-election for the SDP-Liberal Alliance finishing second to David Clelland.

Kenyon was appointed an Officer of the Order of the British Empire (OBE) in the 2005 Birthday Honours for services to the Energy Industry.

Kenyon died 8 December 2013, aged 68.
