= Boyes =

Boyes is a family name and may refer to:

People

- Adam Boyes (footballer) (born 1990), English semi-professional footballer
- Barbara Boyes (c.1932–1981), American statistician
- Brad Boyes (born 1982), American ice hockey player
- Brian Barratt-Boyes (1924–2006), New Zealand heart surgeon
- Carrol Boyes (c.1954–2019), South African artist
- Dave Boyes (born 1964), Canadian rower
- Duncan Gordon Boyes (1846–1869), British recipient of the Victoria Cross
- Fiona Boyes, Australian blues musician
- Frank Boyes (1874–1961), Canadian politician and cheese maker
- George Boyes (1910–1986), South African cricketer
- Harry Boyes (rugby union) (1868–1892), South African rugby union player
- Harry Boyes (cricketer) (1908–1979), South African cricketer
- Jerry Boyes, American football coach
- John H. Boyes (1886–1958), New Zealand Public Service Commissioner
- John Boyes (musician) (born 1966), British musician and photographer
- Karl Boyes (1936–2003), American politician
- Ken Boyes (footballer, born 1895) (1895–1963), English professional footballer
- Ken Boyes (footballer, born 1935) (1935–2010), English professional footballer
- Morgan Boyes (born 2001), Welsh professional footballer
- Rex Boyes, New Zealand soccer player
- Roger Boyes (born 1952), British journalist
- Roland Boyes (1937–2006), British politician
- Stuart Boyes (1899–1973), English cricketer
- Walter Boyes (1913–1960), English professional footballer

Places

- Boyes, Montana, USA
- Boyes Hot Springs, California, USA

Other

- Bad Boyes, 1987 British children's television series
- Boyes (retailer), a UK retail chain
- Coope Boyes and Simpson, British vocal folk trio

== See also ==
- Boye (disambiguation)
- Boye (surname)
- Bois (disambiguation)
- Boise (disambiguation)
