= Boyles =

Boyles is a surname. Notable people with the surname include:

- Charles Boyles (died 1816), English Vice-admiral of the Royal Navy
- James Boyles Murray (1789–1866), businessman and leading member of New York society
- Emerson R. Boyles (1881–1960), American lawyer and judge
- Harry Boyles (1911–2005), pitcher in Major League Baseball
- Edgar William Boyles (1921–2001), senior British civil servant who became Under-Secretary at the Inland Revenue (1975–81)
- Harlan E. Boyles (1929–2003), politician and public servant, North Carolina State Treasurer (1977–2001)
- Erico Boyles Aumentado (1940–2012), former governor of Bohol, congressman, deputy speaker of the Philippine House of Representatives
  - Governor Boyles, one of the 44 barangays of the municipality of Ubay, in Bohol, named after Governor Boyles
- Peter Boyles (born 1943), radio talk show personality
- Kevin Boyles (born 1967), former volleyball player for Canada
- Devarr Boyles (born 1970), retired Bermudian professional football player and now manager
- Chris Boyles (born 1980), American decathlete
- Matthew Boyles (born 1982), American race walker
- Denis Boyles, journalist, editor, university lecturer and the author/editor of several books
- William Boyles, Wisconsin Territory legislator
- Nathan Boyles, Florida state legislator

== See also ==
- Boyle's law, an experimental gas law that describes how the pressure of a gas increases as the volume of its container decreases
- Mount Boyles, the highest peak in the Thomas Mountains, located south of the Sweeney Mountains in Palmer Land
- Boyles Chapel, North Carolina, small unincorporated community in Stokes County, North Carolina, United States
- Earl Boyles Park in Portland, Oregon
- Boyles Terminal Subdivision, railroad line owned by CSX Transportation in the U.S. State of Alabama
- Boyelles
- Boyes
- Boyle (surname)
- Broyles
- Byles (disambiguation)
