= Philip Booth (economist) =

British economist (born 1964)

Philip Booth FIA FSS
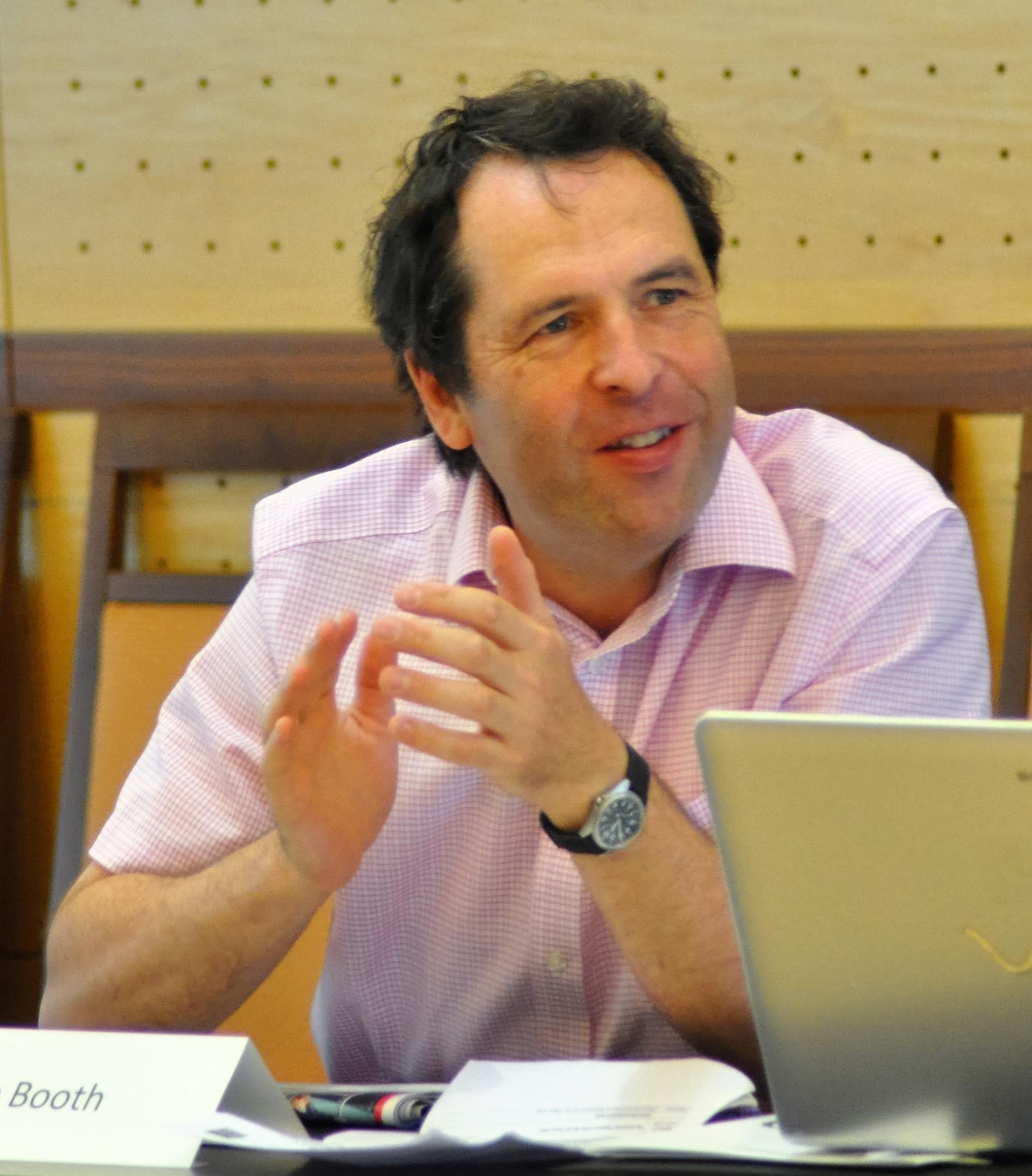
- Born: 14 April 1964 (age 62)

Academic background
- Education: Durham University (BA); City, University of London (PhD)

Academic work
- Discipline: Economics
- Institutions: City, University of London; Institute of Economic Affairs; St Mary's University, Twickenham

Philip M. Booth (born 14 April 1964) is a British economist and academic. He is professor of Catholic social thought and public policy at St Mary's University, Twickenham, and an academic advisor and senior research fellow at the Centre for Enterprise, Markets and Ethics.

== Early life and education ==
Booth graduated from Durham University (Hatfield College), with a 2:1 degree in economics. He then received a PhD from City University London.

== Career ==
Booth began his career in the investment department of Axa Equity and Law, where he worked from 1985 to 1988. He began working at City University, initially in the Department of Actuarial Science and Statistics. He served as head of the Department of Real Estate Finance and Investment from 2000 to 2001 and subsequently as associate dean of City University Business School (now Bayes Business School). From 1999 to 2002, he was also a special adviser to the Bank of England on financial stability.

During the 1990s, Booth was also involved in projects to develop actuarial education and the actuarial profession in Central and Eastern Europe. He was the Conservative Party candidate for Houghton and Washington East at the 1997 United Kingdom general election, finishing second to the Labour candidate Fraser Kemp.

Booth joined the Institute of Economic Affairs (IEA) in 2002, serving as its academic and research director until 2016. He was vice-chairman of the Public Sector Pensions Commission, established in 2009 by the IEA, the Institute of Directors and other organisations to examine public-sector pensions. The commission published its final report in July 2010.

In 2015, Booth was appointed professor of finance, public policy and ethics at St Mary's University, Twickenham. He has since been director of research and public engagement, dean of the Faculty of Education, Humanities and Social Sciences, and director of Catholic mission. He is currently professor of Catholic social thought and public policy at the university.

Booth became a member of the Mont Pelerin Society in 2007. He was a fellow of Blackfriars Hall, Oxford from 2010 to 2011. He is a Fellow of the Institute and Faculty of Actuaries and the Royal Statistical Society, and an honorary member of the Society of Actuaries of Poland.

== Selected publications ==
=== Books ===
- Adams, Andrew T.; Booth, Philip M.; Bowie, David C.; Freeth, Della S. (2003). Investment Mathematics. Wiley. ISBN 9780471998822.
- Booth, Philip; Cooper, Deborah (2005). The Way Out of the Pensions Quagmire. Institute of Economic Affairs. ISBN 9780255365178.
- ———, ed. (2006). Were 364 Economists All Wrong?. London: Institute of Economic Affairs. ISBN 9780255365888.
- ———, ed. (2007). Catholic Social Teaching and the Market Economy. Institute of Economic Affairs. ISBN 9780255365819.
- ———; Wellings, Richard, eds. (2009). Globalization and Free Trade. Edward Elgar. ISBN 9781848445758.
- ———, ed. (2009). Verdict on the Crash: Causes and Policy Implications. London: Institute of Economic Affairs. ISBN 9780255366359.
- ———, ed. (2010). Christian Perspectives on the Financial Crash. London: St Paul's. ISBN 9780854397679.

=== Journal articles ===
- Booth, Philip M. (1997). "The Political Economy of Regulation". British Actuarial Journal. 3 (3).
- ———; Yakoubov, Y. (2000). "Investment Policy for Defined Contribution Pension Schemes Close to Retirement: An Analysis of the "Lifestyle" Concept". North American Actuarial Journal. 4 (2).
- ——— (2008). "Market Failure: A Failed Paradigm". Economic Affairs. 28 (4).
- ———; Zuluaga, Diego (2020). "Socially Useless? The Crucial Contribution of Finance to Economic Life". Journal of New Finance. 1 (2). doi:10.46671/2521-2486.1004.
