= Results of the 1997 United Kingdom general election =

The results of the 1997 United Kingdom general election, by parliamentary constituency were as follows:

Constituency	Cnty	Rgn	Last elctn	Winning party				Turnout (Note: Excludes spoilt ballots)	Votes													
Constituency	Cnty	Rgn	Last elctn	Party	Votes	Share	Majrty	Turnout	Lab (Note: Excludes Speaker) (Note: Includes Labour Party and allied Co-operative Party)	Con	LD	Ref	SNP	UUP	SDLP	PC	SF	DUP	UKIP	Grn (Note: Includes Green Party of England and Wales, Scottish Green Party and Green Party in Northern Ireland)	Other (Note: Includes all other parties, all independent candidates and the Speaker)	Total
Aberavon	WGM	WLS	Lab	Lab	25,650	71.3%	21,571	71.9%	25,650	2,835	4,079	970				2,088				341		35,963
Aberdeen Central	SCT	SCT	(Note: Constituency created in the 1995 boundary review)	Lab	17,745	49.8%	10,801	65.3%	17,745	6,944	4,714	446	5,767									35,616
Aberdeen North	SCT	SCT	Lab	Lab	18,839	47.9%	10,010	70.7%	18,839	5,763	5,421	463	8,379									38,865
Aberdeen South	SCT	SCT	Con	Lab	15,541	35.3%	3,365	72.8%	15,541	11,621	12,176	425	4,299									44,062
Airdrie and Shotts	SCT	SCT		Lab	25,460	61.8%	15,412	71.4%	25,460	3,660	1,719	294	10,048									41,181
Aldershot	HAM	SE	Con	Con	23,119	42.7%	6,621	70.8%	13,057	23,119	16,498								794		683	54,151
Aldridge-Brownhills	WMD	WM	Con	Con	21,856	47.1%	2,526	74.3%	19,330	21,856	5,184											46,370
Altrincham and Sale West	GTM	NW		Con	22,348	43.2%	1,505	73.3%	20,843	22,348	6,535	1,348							270		313	51,657
Alyn and Deeside	CON	WLS	Lab	Lab	25,955	61.9%	16,403	72.2%	25,955	9,552	4,076	1,627				738				341		41,948
Amber Valley	DBY	EM	Con	Lab	29,943	54.7%	11,613	76.0%	29,943	18,330	4,219	2,283										41,948
Angus	SCT	SCT		SNP	20,792	48.3%	10,189	72.1%	6,733	10,603	4,065	883	20,792									43,076
Argyll and Bute	SCT	SCT	LD	LD	14,359	40.2%	6,081	72.9%	5,596	6,774	14,359	713	8,278									35,720
Arundel and South Downs	WSX	SE		Con	27,251	53.1%	14,035	75.5%	9,376	27,251	13,216								1,494			51,337
Ashfield	NTT	EM	Lab	Lab	32,979	65.1%	22,728	70.0%	32,979	10,251	4,882	1,896									595	50,603
Ashford	KEN	SE	Con	Con	22,899	41.4%	5,345	74.2%	17,554	22,899	10,901	3,201								660	89	55,294
Ashton-under-Lyne	GTM	NW	Lab	Lab	31,919	67.5%	22,965	65.5%	31,919	8,954	4,603	1,346									458	47,280
Aylesbury	BKM	SE	Con	Con	25,426	44.2%	8,419	72.8%	12,759	25,426	17,007	2,196									166	57,554
Ayr	SCT	SCT	Con	Lab	21,679	48.4%	6,543	80.0%	21,679	15,136	2,116	200	5,625									44,756
Banbury	OXF	SE	Con	Con	25,076	42.9%	4,737	75.1%	20,339	25,076	9,761	2,245							364	530	131	58,446
Banff and Buchan	SCT	SCT	SNP	SNP	22,409	55.8%	12,845	68.7%	9,564	4,747	2,398	1,060	22,409									40,178
Barking	LND	LND	Lab	Lab	21,698	65.8%	15,896	61.7%	21,698	5,802	3,128	1,283									1,053	32,964
Barnsley Central	SYK	YTH	Lab	Lab	28,090	77.0%	24,501	59.7%	28,090	3,589	3,481	1,325										36,485
Barnsley East and Mexborough	SYK	YTH		Lab	31,699	73.1%	26,763	63.6%	31,699	4,936	4,489	797									1,414	43,335
Barnsley West and Penistone	SYK	YTH	Lab	Lab	25,017	59.3%	17,267	65.0%	25,017	7,750	7,613	1,828										42,208
Barrow and Furness	CMA	NW	Lab	Lab	27,630	57.3%	14,497	72.0%	27,630	13,133	4,264	1,208									1,995	48,230
Basildon	ESS	E	Con	Lab	29,646	55.8%	13,280	71.7%	29,646	16,366	4,608	2,462										53,082
Basingstoke	HAM	SE	Con	Con	24,751	43.3%	2,397	74.1%	22,354	24,751	9,714										310	57,129
Bassetlaw	NTT	EM	Lab	Lab	29,298	61.1%	17,460	70.4%	29,298	11,838	4,950	1,838										47,924
Bath	AVN	SW	LD	LD	26,169	48.5%	9,319	76.2%	8,828	16,850	26,169	1,192							315	580	55	53,989
Batley and Spen	WYK	YTH	Con	Lab	23,213	49.4%	6,141	73.2%	23,213	17,072	4,133	1,691								384	472	46,965
Battersea	LND	LND	Con	Lab	24,047	50.7%	5,360	70.8%	24,047	18,687	3,482	804							250		127	47,397
Beaconsfield	BKM	SE	Con	Con	24,709	49.2%	13,987	72.8%	10,063	24,709	10,722	2,197							451		2,059	50,201
Beckenham	LND	LND	Con	Con	23,084	42.5%	4,953	74.7%	18,131	23,084	9,858	1,663							506		1,108	54,350
Bedford	BDF	E		Lab	24,774	50.6%	8,300	73.5%	24,774	16,474	6,044	1,503									149	48,944
Belfast East	NIR	NIR	DUP	DUP	16,640	42.6%	6,754	63.2%		928				9,886	629		810	16,640			10,136	39,029
Belfast North	NIR	NIR	UUP	UUP	21,478	51.8%	13,024	64.2%						21,478	8,454		8,375			539	2,616	41,462
Belfast South	NIR	NIR	UUP	UUP	14,201	36.0%	4,600	62.2%		962				14,201	9,601		2,019				12,701	39,484
Belfast West	NIR	NIR	SDLP	SF	25,662	55.9%	7,909	74.3%						1,556	17,753		25,662				914	45,885
Berwick-upon-Tweed	NBL	NE	LD	LD	19,007	45.5%	8,042	73.5%	10,965	10,058	19,007	1,423							352			41,805
Bethnal Green and Bow	LND	LND		Lab	20,697	46.3%	11,285	60.3%	20,697	9,412	5,361	557								812	7,843	44,682
Beverley and Holderness	HUM	YTH		Con	21,629	41.2%	1,211	72.9%	20,418	21,629	9,689								695		111	52,542
Bexhill and Battle	SXE	SE	Con	Con	23,570	48.1%	11,100	74.5%	8,866	23,570	12,470	3,302							786			48,994
Bexleyheath and Crayford	LND	LND		Lab	21,942	45.5%	3,415	76.1%	21,942	18,527	5,391	1,551							383		429	48,223
Billericay	ESS	E	Con	Con	22,033	39.8%	1,356	72.4%	20,677	22,033	8,763										3,947	55,420
Birkenhead	MSY	NW	Lab	Lab	27,825	70.8%	21,843	65.8%	27,825	5,982	3,548	800									1,168	39,323
Birmingham Edgbaston	WMD	WM	Con	Lab	23,554	48.6%	4,842	68.9%	23,554	18,712	4,691	1,065									443	48,465
Birmingham Erdington	WMD	WM	Lab	Lab	23,764	58.8%	12,657	60.8%	23,764	11,107	4,112	1,424										40,407
Birmingham Hall Green	WMD	WM	Con	Lab	22,372	53.5%	8,420	71.2%	22,372	13,952	4,034	1,461										41,819
Birmingham Hodge Hill	WMD	WM	Lab	Lab	22,398	65.6%	14,200	60.9%	22,398	8,198	2,891								660			34,147
Birmingham Ladywood	WMD	WM	Lab	Lab	28,134	74.1%	23,082	60.8%	28,134	5,052	3,020	1,086									685	37,977
Birmingham Northfield	WMD	WM	Lab	Lab	22,316	57.4%	11,443	68.3%	22,316	10,873	4,078	1,243									337	38,847
Birmingham Perry Barr	WMD	WM	Lab	Lab	28,921	63.0%	18,957	64.5%	28,921	9,964	4,523	843									1,636	45,887
Birmingham Selly Oak	WMD	WM	Lab	Lab	28,121	55.6%	14,088	70.1%	28,121	14,033	6,121	1,520									755	50,550
Birmingham Sparkbrook and Small Heath	WMD	WM		Lab	26,841	64.3%	19,526	57.0%	26,841	7,315	3,889	737								959	2,024	41,765
Birmingham Yardley	WMD	WM	Lab	Lab	17,778	47.0%	5,315	71.2%	17,778	6,736	12,463	646							164			37,787
Bishop Auckland	DUR	NE	Lab	Lab	30,359	65.9%	21,064	68.4%	30,359	9,295	4,293	2,104										46,051
Blaby	LEI	EM	Con	Con	24,564	45.8%	6,474	76.1%	18,090	24,564	8,001	2,018									920	53,593
Blackburn	LAN	NW	Lab	Lab	26,141	55.0%	14,451	65.0%	26,141	11,690	4,990	1,892								608	2,174	47,495
Blackpool North and Fleetwood	LAN	NW		Lab	28,051	52.1%	8,946	71.7%	28,051	19,105	4,600	1,704									288	53,748
Blackpool South	LAN	NW	Lab	Lab	29,282	57.0%	11,616	67.8%	29,282	17,666	4,392											51,340
Blaenau Gwent	GNT	WLS	Lab	Lab	31,493	79.5%	28,035	72.3%	31,493	2,607	3,458					2,072						39,630
Blaydon	TWR	NE	Lab	Lab	27,535	60.0%	16,605	71.0%	27,535	6,048	10,930										1,412	45,925
Blyth Valley	NBL	NE	Lab	Lab	27,276	64.2%	17,736	68.8%	27,276	5,666	9,540											42,482
Bognor Regis and Littlehampton	WSX	SE		Con	20,537	44.2%	7,321	69.6%	13,216	20,537	11,153								1,537			46,443
Bolsover	DBY	EM	Lab	Lab	35,073	74.0%	27,149	71.3%	35,073	7,924	4,417											47,414
Bolton North East	GTM	NW	Con	Lab	27,621	56.1%	12,669	72.4%	27,621	14,952	4,862	1,096									676	49,207
Bolton South East	GTM	NW	Lab	Lab	29,856	68.9%	21,311	65.2%	29,856	8,545	3,805	973									170	43,349
Bolton West	GTM	NW	Con	Lab	24,342	49.5%	7,072	77.3%	24,342	17,270	5,309	865									1,374	49,160
Bootle	MSY	NW	Lab	Lab	31,668	82.9%	28,421	66.7%	31,668	3,247	2,191	571									546	38,223
Boston and Skegness	LIN	EM		Con	19,750	42.4%	647	68.9%	19,103	19,750	7,721											46,574
Bosworth	LEI	EM	Con	Con	21,189	40.6%	1,027	76.4%	20,162	21,189	9,281	1,521										52,153
Bournemouth East	DOR	SW	Con	Con	17,997	41.4%	4,346	70.2%	9,181	17,997	13,655	1,808							791			43,432
Bournemouth West	DOR	SW	Con	Con	17,115	41.7%	5,710	66.2%	10,093	17,115	11,405	1,910							281		268	41,072
Bracknell	BRK	SE		Con	27,983	47.4%	10,387	74.5%	17,596	27,983	9,122	1,636							569		2,185	59,091
Bradford North	WYK	YTH	Lab	Lab	23,493	56.1%	12,770	63.3%	23,493	10,723	6,083	1,227									369	41,895
Bradford South	WYK	YTH	Lab	Lab	25,558	56.7%	12,936	65.9%	25,558	12,622	5,093	1,785										45,058
Bradford West	WYK	YTH	Lab	Lab	18,932	41.6%	3,877	63.3%	18,932	15,055	6,737	1,348								861	2,635	45,568
Braintree	ESS	E	Con	Lab	23,729	42.7%	1,451	76.1%	23,729	22,278	6,418	2,165								712	274	55,576
Brecon and Radnorshire	POW	WLS	Con	LD	17,516	40.8%	5,097	82.2%	11,424	12,419	17,516	900				622						42,881
Brent East	LND	LND	Lab	Lab	23,748	67.3%	15,882	65.9%	23,748	7,866	2,751										907	35,272
Brent North	LND	LND	Con	Lab	19,343	50.7%	4,019	70.5%	19,343	15,324	3,104										403	38,174
Brent South	LND	LND	Lab	Lab	25,180	73.0%	19,691	64.5%	25,180	5,489	2,670	497								389	273	34,498
Brentford and Isleworth	LND	LND	Con	Lab	32,249	57.4%	14,424	69.5%	32,249	17,825	4,613								614	687	147	56,135
Brentwood and Ongar	ESS	E	Con	Con	23,031	45.4%	9,690	76.6%	11,231	23,031	13,341	2,658							465			50,726
Bridgend	MGM	WLS	Lab	Lab	25,115	58.1%	15,248	72.3%	25,115	9,867	4,968	1,662				1,649						43,261
Bridgwater	SOM	SW	Con	Con	20,174	36.9%	1,796	74.4%	13,519	20,174	18,378	2,551										54,622
Brigg and Goole	HUM	YTH		Lab	23,493	50.2%	6,389	73.5%	23,493	17,104	4,692	1,513										46,802
Brighton Kemptown	SXE	SE	Con	Lab	21,479	46.6%	3,534	70.6%	21,479	17,945	4,478	1,526									704	46,132
Brighton Pavilion	SXE	SE	Con	Lab	26,737	54.6%	13,181	73.4%	26,737	13,556	4,644	1,304							179	1,249	1,282	48,951
Bristol East	AVN	SW	Lab	Lab	27,418	56.9%	16,159	69.7%	27,418	11,259	7,121	1,479									924	48,201
Bristol North West	AVN	SW	Con	Lab	27,575	49.9%	11,382	73.7%	27,575	16,193	7,263	1,609									887	55,245
Bristol South	AVN	SW	Lab	Lab	29,890	60.0%	19,328	68.9%	29,890	10,562	6,691	1,486								722	508	49,859
Bristol West	AVN	SW	Con	Lab	22,068	35.2%	1,493	73.8%	22,068	20,575	17,551	1,304								852	291	62,641
Bromley and Chislehurst	LND	LND		Con	24,428	46.3%	11,118	74.1%	13,310	24,428	12,530								1,176	640	654	52,738
Bromsgrove	HWR	WM	Con	Con	24,620	47.2%	3,885	77.1%	19,725	24,620	6,200	1,411							251			52,207
Broxbourne	HRT	E	Con	Con	22,952	48.8%	6,653	70.3%	16,299	22,952	5,310	1,633									782	46,976
Broxtowe	NTT	EM	Con	Lab	27,343	47.0%	5,575	78.3%	27,343	21,768	6,934	2,092										58,133
Buckingham	BKM	SE	Con	Con	24,594	49.8%	12,386	78.5%	12,208	24,594	12,175										421	49,398
Burnley	LAN	NW	Lab	Lab	26,210	57.9%	17,062	66.9%	26,210	9,148	7,877	2,010										45,245
Burton	STS	WM	Con	Lab	27,810	51.0%	6,330	75.1%	27,810	21,480	4,617										604	54,511
Bury North	GTM	NW	Con	Lab	28,523	51.8%	7,866	77.8%	28,523	20,657	4,536	1,337										55,053
Bury South	GTM	NW	Con	Lab	28,658	56.9%	12,381	75.4%	28,658	16,277	4,227	1,216										50,378
Bury St Edmunds	SFK	E	Con	Con	21,290	38.3%	368	75.0%	20,922	21,290	10,102	2,939									272	55,525
Caernarfon	GWN	WLS	PC	PC	17,616	51.0%	7,449	73.7%	10,167	4,230	1,686	811				17,616						34,510
Caerphilly	GNT	WLS	Lab	Lab	30,697	67.3%	25,839	70.1%	30,697	4,858	3,724	1,337				4,383					270	45,269
Caithness, Sutherland and Easter Ross	SCT	SCT		LD	10,381	35.6%	2,259	70.2%	8,122	3,148	10,381	369	6,710						212	230		29,172
Calder Valley	WYK	YTH	Con	Lab	26,050	46.1%	6,255	75.4%	26,050	19,795	8,322	1,380								488	431	56,466
Camberwell and Peckham	LND	LND		Lab	19,734	69.5%	16,451	55.3%	19,734	3,283	3,198	692									1,467	28,374
Cambridge	CAM	E	Lab	Lab	27,436	53.4%	14,137	71.5%	27,436	13,299	8,287	1,262								654	401	51,339
Cannock Chase	STS	WM		Lab	28,705	54.8%	14,478	72.4%	28,705	14,227	4,537	1,663									3,234	52,366
Canterbury	KEN	SE	Con	Con	20,913	38.6%	3,964	72.4%	16,949	20,913	12,854	2,460							281	588	64	54,109
Cardiff Central	SGM	WLS	Lab	Lab	18,464	43.7%	7,923	70.0%	18,464	8,470	10,541	760				1,504					2,514	42,253
Cardiff North	SGM	WLS	Con	Lab	24,460	50.4%	8,126	80.2%	24,460	16,334	5,294	1,199				1,201						48,488
Cardiff South and Penarth	SGM	WLS	Lab	Lab	22,647	53.4%	13,861	68.3%	22,647	8,786	3,964	1,211				1,356					4,456	42,420
Cardiff West	SGM	WLS	Lab	Lab	24,297	60.3%	15,628	69.2%	24,297	8,669	4,366	996				1,949						40,277
Carlisle	CMA	NW	Lab	Lab	25,031	57.4%	12,390	72.8%	25,031	12,641	4,576	1,233									126	43,607
Carmarthen East and Dinefwr	DFD	WLS		Lab	17,907	42.9%	3,450	78.6%	17,907	5,022	3,150	1,196				14,457						32,654
Carmarthen West and South Pembrokeshire	DFD	WLS		Lab	20,956	49.1%	9,621	76.5%	20,956	11,355	3,516	1,432				5,402						42,641
Carrick, Cumnock and Doon Valley	SCT	SCT	Lab	Lab	29,398	59.8%	21,062	75.0%	29,398	8,336	2,613	634	8,190									49,171
Carshalton and Wallington	LND	LND	Con	LD	18,490	38.2%	2,267	73.3%	11,565	16,223	18,490	1,289							218	377	261	48,423
Castle Point	ESS	E	Con	Lab	20,605	42.4%	1,143	72.1%	20,605	19,462	4,477	2,700									1,301	48,545
Central Fife	SCT	SCT	Lab	Lab	23,912	58.7%	13,713	69.8%	23,912	3,669	2,610	375	10,199									40,765
Central Suffolk and North Ipswich	SFK	E		Con	22,493	42.6%	3,538	75.0%	18,955	22,493	10,709										489	52,823
Ceredigion	DFD	WLS		PC	16,728	41.6%	6,961	73.9%	9,767	5,983	6,616	1,092				16,728						40,186
Charnwood	LEI	EM		Con	26,110	46.5%	5,900	77.3%	20,210	26,110	7,224	2,104									525	56,173
Chatham and Aylesford	KEN	SE		Lab	21,191	43.1%	2,790	70.6%	21,191	18,401	7,389	1,538							493		149	49,161
Cheadle	GTM	NW	Con	Con	22,944	43.7%	3,189	77.3%	8,253	22,944	19,755	1,511										52,463
Cheltenham	GLS	SW	LD	LD	24,877	49.5%	6,645	74.0%	5,100	18,232	24,877	1,065							302		727	50,303
Chesham and Amersham	BKM	SE	Con	Con	26,298	50.4%	13,859	74.5%	10,240	26,298	12,439	2,528							618		74	52,197
Chesterfield	DBY	EM	Lab	Lab	26,105	50.8%	5,775	70.9%	26,105	4,752	20,330										202	51,389
Chichester	WSX	SE	Con	Con	25,895	46.4%	9,734	74.6%	9,605	25,895	16,161	3,318							800			55,779
Chingford and Woodford Green	LND	LND		Con	21,109	47.5%	5,714	70.7%	15,395	21,109	6,885										1,059	44,448
Chipping Barnet	LND	LND	Con	Con	21,317	43.0%	1,035	71.7%	20,282	21,317	6,121	1,190									655	49,565
Chorley	LAN	NW	Con	Lab	30,607	53.0%	9,870	77.3%	30,607	20,737	4,900	1,319									143	57,706
Christchurch	DOR	SW	Con	Con	26,095	46.4%	2,165	78.5%	3,884	26,095	23,930	1,684							606			56,199
Cities of London and Westminster	LND	LND	Con	Con	18,981	47.3%	4,881	54.2%	14,100	18,981	4,933	1,161							215		765	40,155
City of Chester	CHS	NW	Con	Lab	29,806	53.0%	10,553	78.4%	29,806	19,253	5,353	1,487									358	56,257
City of Durham	DUR	NE	Lab	Lab	31,102	63.3%	22,504	70.8%	31,102	8,598	7,499	1,723									213	49,135
City of York	NYK	YTH	Lab	Lab	34,956	59.9%	20,523	73.2%	34,956	14,433	6,537	1,083							319	880	137	58,345
Cleethorpes	HUM	YTH		Lab	26,058	51.6%	9,176	73.4%	26,058	16,882	5,746	894										49,580
Clwyd South	CON	WLS		Lab	22,901	58.1%	13,810	73.6%	22,901	9,091	3,684	1,207				2,500						39,383
Clwyd West	CON	WLS		Lab	14,918	37.1%	1,848	75.3%	14,918	13,070	5,151	1,114				5,421					583	40,257
Clydebank and Milngavie	SCT	SCT	Lab	Lab	21,583	55.2%	13,320	75.0%	21,583	4,885	4,086	269	8,263									39,086
Clydesdale	SCT	SCT	Lab	Lab	23,859	52.5%	13,809	71.6%	23,859	7,396	3,796		10,050								311	45,412
Coatbridge and Chryston	SCT	SCT		Lab	25,694	68.3%	19,292	72.3%	25,694	3,216	2,048	249	6,402									37,609
Colchester	ESS	E	Con	LD	17,886	34.4%	1,551	69.2%	15,891	16,335	17,886	1,776									148	52,036
Colne Valley	WYK	YTH	Con	Lab	23,285	41.3%	4,840	76.9%	23,285	18,445	12,755								478	493	955	56,411
Congleton	CHS	NW	Con	Con	22,012	41.2%	6,130	77.6%	14,713	22,012	15,882								811			53,418
Conwy	CON	WLS	Con	Lab	14,561	35.0%	1,596	75.4%	14,561	10,085	12,965	760				2,844					345	41,560
Copeland	CMA	NW	Lab	Lab	24,077	58.2%	11,996	76.3%	24,077	12,081	3,814	1,036									389	41,397
Corby	NTH	EM	Con	Lab	29,888	55.4%	11,860	77.9%	29,888	18,028	4,045	1,356							507		133	53,957
Cotswold	GLS	SW		Con	23,698	46.4%	11,965	75.9%	11,608	23,698	11,733	3,393								560	129	51,121
Coventry North East	WMD	WM	Lab	Lab	31,856	66.3%	22,569	64.8%	31,856	9,287	3,866	1,125									1,951	48,085
Coventry North West	WMD	WM	Lab	Lab	30,901	56.9%	16,601	70.7%	30,901	14,300	5,690	1,269									2,162	54,322
Coventry South	WMD	WM		Lab	25,511	50.9%	10,953	68.7%	25,511	14,558	4,617	943									4,495	50,124
Crawley	WSX	SE	Con	Lab	27,750	55.1%	11,707	72.9%	27,750	16,043	4,141	1,932							322		230	50,417
Crewe and Nantwich	CHS	NW	Lab	Lab	29,640	58.2%	15,798	73.9%	29,640	13,662	5,940	1,543										50,605
Crosby	MSY	NW	Con	Lab	22,549	51.1%	7,182	77.2%	22,549	15,367	5,080	813									332	44,141
Croydon Central	LND	LND	Con	Lab	25,432	45.6%	3,897	69.6%	25,432	21,535	6,061	1,886							290	595		55,799
Croydon North	LND	LND		Lab	32,672	62.2%	18,398	68.2%	32,672	14,274	4,066	1,155							396			52,563
Croydon South	LND	LND	Con	Con	25,649	47.3%	11,930	73.5%	13,719	25,649	11,441	2,631									759	54,199
Cumbernauld and Kilsyth	SCT	SCT	Lab	Lab	21,141	58.7%	11,128	75.0%	21,141	2,441	1,368	107	10,013								954	36,024
Cunninghame North	SCT	SCT	Lab	Lab	20,686	50.3%	11,039	73.3%	20,686	9,647	2,271	440	7,584								501	41,129
Cunninghame South	SCT	SCT	Lab	Lab	22,233	62.7%	14,869	71.5%	22,233	3,571	1,604	178	7,364								494	35,444
Cynon Valley	MGM	WLS	Lab	Lab	23,307	69.7%	19,755	69.2%	23,307	2,260	3,459	844				3,552						33,422
Dagenham	LND	LND	Lab	Lab	23,759	65.7%	17,054	62.1%	23,759	6,705	2,704	1,411									1,584	36,163
Darlington	DUR	NE	Lab	Lab	29,658	61.6%	16,025	73.9%	29,658	13,633	3,483	1,399										48,172
Dartford	KEN	SE	Con	Lab	25,278	48.6%	4,328	74.6%	25,278	20,950	4,872										939	52,039
Daventry	NTH	EM	Con	Con	28,615	46.3%	7,378	77.0%	21,237	28,615	9,233	2,018							443		204	61,750
Delyn	CON	WLS	Lab	Lab	23,300	57.2%	12,693	75.9%	23,300	10,607	4,160	1,117				1,558						40,742
Denton and Reddish	GTM	NW	Lab	Lab	30,137	65.4%	20,311	66.9%	30,137	9,826	6,121											46,084
Derby North	DBY	EM	Con	Lab	29,844	53.2%	10,615	73.8%	29,844	19,229	5,059	1,816									195	56,143
Derby South	DBY	EM	Lab	Lab	29,154	56.3%	16,106	67.8%	29,154	13,048	7,438	1,862									317	51,819
Devizes	WIL	SW	Con	Con	25,710	42.8%	9,782	74.7%	14,551	25,710	15,928	3,021							622		204	60,036
Dewsbury	WYK	YTH	Lab	Lab	21,286	49.4%	8,323	70.0%	21,286	12,963	4,422	1,019								383	3,002	43,905
Don Valley	SYK	YTH	Lab	Lab	25,376	58.3%	14,659	66.4%	25,376	10,717	4,238	1,379								493	1,354	43,557
Doncaster Central	SYK	YTH	Lab	Lab	26,961	62.1%	17,856	63.9%	26,961	9,105	4,091	1,273							462		1,548	43,440
Doncaster North	SYK	YTH	Lab	Lab	27,843	69.8%	21,937	63.3%	27,843	5,906	3,369	1,589									1,181	39,888
Dover	KEN	SE	Con	Lab	29,535	54.5%	11,739	78.9%	29,535	17,796	4,302	2,124							443			54,200
Dudley North	WMD	WM		Lab	24,471	51.2%	9,457	69.5%	24,471	15,014	3,939	1,201									3,183	47,808
Dudley South	WMD	WM		Lab	27,124	56.6%	13,027	71.8%	27,124	14,097	5,214	1,467										47,902
Dulwich and West Norwood	LND	LND		Lab	27,807	61.0%	16,769	65.5%	27,807	11,038	4,916	897							159		798	45,615
Dumbarton	SCT	SCT	Lab	Lab	20,470	49.6%	10,883	73.4%	20,470	7,283	3,144	255	9,587						242		283	41,264
Dumfries	SCT	SCT	Lab	Lab	23,528	47.5%	9,643	78.2%	23,528	13,885	5,487	533	5,977								117	49,527
Dundee East	SCT	SCT	Lab	Lab	20,718	51.1%	9,961	69.3%	20,718	6,397	1,677	601	10,757								378	40,528
Dundee West	SCT	SCT	Lab	Lab	20,875	53.8%	11,859	67.7%	20,875	5,015	2,972	411	9,016								428	38,717
Dunfermline East	SCT	SCT	Lab	Lab	24,441	66.8%	18,751	69.6%	24,441	3,656	2,164	632	5,690									36,583
Dunfermline West	SCT	SCT	Lab	Lab	19,338	53.1%	12,354	69.3%	19,338	4,606	4,963	543	6,984									36,434
Ealing North	LND	LND	Con	Lab	29,904	53.7%	9,160	71.3%	29,904	20,744	3,887								689	502		55,726
Ealing Southall	LND	LND	Lab	Lab	32,791	60.0%	21,423	66.9%	32,791	11,368	5,687	854							428	934	2,580	54,642
Ealing, Acton and Shepherd's Bush	LND	LND		Lab	28,052	58.4%	15,647	66.7%	28,052	12,405	5,163	637							385		1,422	48,064
Easington	DUR	NE	Lab	Lab	33,600	80.2%	30,012	67.0%	33,600	3,588	3,025	1,179									503	41,895
East Antrim	NIR	NIR	UUP	UUP	13,318	38.8%	6,389	58.3%		2,334				13,318	1,576		543	6,682			9,900	34,353
East Devon	DEV	SW	Con	Con	22,797	43.4%	7,494	76.0%	9,292	22,797	15,308	3,200							459		1,494	52,550
East Ham	LND	LND	Lab	Lab	25,779	64.6%	19,358	60.3%	25,779	6,421	2,599	845									4,245	39,889
East Hampshire	HAM	SE	Con	Con	27,927	48.0%	11,590	75.6%	9,945	27,927	16,337	2,757							513	649		58,128
East Kilbride	SCT	SCT	Lab	Lab	27,584	56.5%	17,384	74.8%	27,584	5,863	3,527	306	10,200								1,316	48,796
East Londonderry	NIR	NIR	UUP	UUP	13,558	36.0%	3,794	64.8%		436				13,558	8,273		3,463	9,767			2,608	38,102
East Lothian	SCT	SCT	Lab	Lab	22,881	52.7%	14,221	75.6%	22,881	8,660	4,575	491	6,825									43,432
East Surrey	SRY	SE	Con	Con	27,389	50.1%	15,093	74.6%	11,573	27,389	12,296	2,656							569		173	54,656
East Worthing and Shoreham	WSX	SE		Con	20,864	40.5%	5,098	72.9%	12,335	20,864	15,766	1,683							921			51,569
East Yorkshire	HUM	YTH		Con	20,904	42.7%	3,337	70.5%	17,567	20,904	9,070										1,430	48,971
Eastbourne	SXE	SE	Con	Con	22,183	42.1%	1,994	72.8%	6,576	22,183	20,189	2,724									995	52,667
Eastleigh	HAM	SE	Con	LD	19,453	35.1%	754	76.9%	14,883	18,699	19,453	2,013							446			55,494
Eastwood	SCT	SCT	Con	Lab	20,766	39.7%	3,236	77.4%	20,766	17,530	6,110	497	6,826						130		393	52,252
Eccles	GTM	NW	Lab	Lab	30,468	66.7%	21,916	65.6%	30,468	8,552	4,905	1,765										45,690
Eddisbury	CHS	NW	Con	Con	21,027	42.5%	1,185	75.8%	19,842	21,027	6,540	2,041										49,450
Edinburgh Central	SCT	SCT	Lab	Lab	20,125	47.1%	11,070	66.8%	20,125	9,055	5,605	495	6,750							607	593	42,735
Edinburgh East and Musselburgh	SCT	SCT		Lab	22,564	53.6%	14,530	70.6%	22,564	6,483	4,511	526	8,034									42,118
Edinburgh North and Leith	SCT	SCT		Lab	19,209	46.9%	10,978	66.5%	19,209	7,312	5,335	441	8,231								417	40,945
Edinburgh Central	SCT	SCT	Con	Lab	19,675	43.0%	4,862	76.7%	19,675	14,813	4,575	422	5,952						81	224		45,742
Edinburgh South	SCT	SCT	Lab	Lab	20,993	46.8%	11,452	71.8%	20,993	9,541	7,911	504	5,791								98	44,838
Edinburgh West	SCT	SCT	Con	LD	20,578	43.2%	7,253	77.9%	8,948	13,325	20,578	277	4,210								293	47,631
Edmonton	LND	LND	Con	Lab	27,029	60.3%	13,472	70.3%	27,029	13,557	2,847	708							260		437	44,838
Ellesmere Port and Neston	CHS	NW	Lab	Lab	31,310	59.6%	16,036	75.8%	31,310	15,274	4,673	1,305										52,562
Elmet	WYK	YTH	Con	Lab	28,348	52.4%	8,779	76.8%	28,348	19,569	4,691	1,487										54,185
Eltham	LND	LND	Con	Lab	23,710	54.6%	10,182	75.7%	23,710	13,528	3,701	1,414									1,075	43,428
Enfield North	LND	LND	Con	Lab	24,138	50.7%	6,812	70.4%	24,138	17,326	4,264	857							484		590	47,659
Enfield Southgate	LND	LND	Con	Lab	20,570	44.2%	1,433	70.6%	20,570	19,137	4,966	1,342									518	46,533
Epping Forest	ESS	E	Con	Con	24,117	45.5%	5,252	72.9%	18,865	24,117	7,074										743	53,750
Epsom and Ewell	SRY	SE	Con	Con	24,717	45.6%	11,525	74.0%	13,192	24,717	12,380	2,355							544	527	466	54,181
Erewash	DBY	EM	Con	Lab	31,196	51.7%	9,135	78.0%	31,196	22,061	5,181	1,404									496	60,338
Erith and Thamesmead	LND	LND		Lab	25,812	62.1%	17,424	65.6%	25,812	8,388	5,001	1,394							274		718	41,587
Esher and Walton	SRY	SE		Con	26,747	49.8%	14,528	74.3%	12,219	26,747	10,937	2,904							558		302	53,667
Exeter	DEV	SW	Con	Lab	29,398	47.5%	11,705	78.2%	29,398	17,693	11,148								638	643	2,344	61,864
Falkirk East	SCT	SCT	Lab	Lab	23,344	56.1%	13,385	73.2%	23,344	5,813	2,153	325	9,959									41,594
Falkirk West	SCT	SCT	Lab	Lab	22,772	59.3%	13,783	72.0%	22,772	4,639	1,970		8,989									38,370
Falmouth and Camborne	CUL	SW	Con	Lab	18,151	33.8%	2,688	75.1%	18,151	15,463	13,512	3,534							355		2,617	53,632
Fareham	HAM	SE	Con	Con	24,436	46.8%	10,358	75.9%	14,078	24,436	10,234	2,914									515	52,177
Faversham and Mid Kent	KEN	SE	Con	Con	22,016	44.4%	4,173	73.5%	17,843	22,016	6,138	2,073							431	380	725	49,606
Feltham and Heston	LND	LND	Lab	Lab	27,836	59.7%	15,273	64.9%	27,836	12,563	4,264	1,099									859	46,621
Fermanagh and South Tyrone	NIR	NIR	UUP	UUP	24,862	51.5%	13,688	74.8%						24,862	11,060		11,174				1,194	48,290
Finchley and Golders Green	LND	LND		Lab	23,180	46.1%	3,189	69.7%	23,180	19,991	5,670	684							205	576		50,306
Folkestone and Hythe	KEN	SE	Con	Con	20,313	39.0%	6,332	72.7%	12,939	20,313	13,981	4,188							378		251	52,050
Forest of Dean	GLS	SW		Lab	24,203	48.2%	6,343	79.1%	24,203	17,860	6,165	1,624									332	50,184
Foyle	NIR	NIR	SDLP	SDLP	25,109	52.5%	13,664	70.4%							25,109		11,445	10,290			971	47,815
Fylde	LAN	NW	Con	Con	25,443	48.9%	8,963	72.9%	16,480	25,443	7,609	2,372									163	52,067
Gainsborough	LIN	EM		Con	20,593	43.1%	6,826	74.6%	13,767	20,593	13,436											47,796
Galloway and Upper Nithsdale	SCT	SCT	Con	SNP	18,449	43.9%	5,624	79.7%	6,861	12,825	2,700	428	18,449						189		566	42,018
Gateshead East and Washington West	TWR	NE		Lab	31,047	72.1%	24,950	67.2%	31,047	6,097	4,622	1,315										43,081
Gedling	NTT	EM	Con	Lab	24,390	46.8%	3,802	75.7%	24,390	20,588	5,180	2,006										52,164
Gillingham	KEN	SE	Con	Lab	20,187	39.8%	1,980	72.0%	20,187	18,207	9,649	1,492							590		558	50,683
Glasgow Anniesland	SCT	SCT		Lab	20,951	61.8%	15,154	63.8%	20,951	3,881	2,453	84	5,797						86		627	33,879
Glasgow Baillieston	SCT	SCT		Lab	20,925	65.7%	14,840	62.2%	20,925	2,468	1,217	188	6,085								970	31,853
Glasgow Cathcart	SCT	SCT	Lab	Lab	19,158	57.4%	12,965	67.6%	19,158	4,248	2,302	344	6,913								1,145	33,390
Glasgow Govan	SCT	SCT	Lab	Lab	14,216	44.1%	2,914	64.5%	14,216	2,839	1,918	201	11,302								1,769	32,245
Glasgow Kelvin	SCT	SCT		Lab	16,643	51.0%	9,665	56.1%	16,643	3,539	4,629	282	6,978								583	32,654
Glasgow Maryhill	SCT	SCT	Lab	Lab	19,301	64.9%	14,264	56.4%	19,301	1,747	2,119	77	5,037								1,440	29,721
Glasgow Pollok	SCT	SCT	Lab	Lab	19,653	59.9%	13,791	66.5%	19,653	1,979	1,137	152	5,862								4,019	32,802
Glasgow Rutherglen	SCT	SCT	Lab	Lab	20,430	57.5%	15,007	70.1%	20,430	3,288	5,167	150	5,423								1,063	35,521
Glasgow Shettleston	SCT	SCT	Lab	Lab	19,616	73.2%	15,868	55.7%	19,616	1,484	1,061	151	3,748								753	26,813
Glasgow Springburn	SCT	SCT	Lab	Lab	22,534	71.4%	17,326	58.9%	22,534	1,893	1,349	186	5,208								407	31,577
Gloucester	GLS	SW	Con	Lab	28,943	50.0%	8,259	73.6%	28,943	20,684	6,069	1,482							455		281	57,914
Gordon	SCT	SCT	LD	LD	17,999	42.6%	6,997	71.9%	4,350	11,002	17,999	459	8,435									42,245
Gosport	HAM	SE	Con	Con	21,085	43.6%	6,258	70.3%	14,827	21,085	9,479	2,538									426	48,355
Gower	WGM	WLS	Lab	Lab	23,313	53.8%	13,007	75.1%	23,313	10,306	5,624	1,745				2,226					122	43,336
Grantham and Stamford	LIN	EM		Con	22,672	42.8%	2,692	73.3%	19,980	22,672	6,612	2,721							556		429	52,970
Gravesham	KEN	SE	Con	Lab	26,460	49.7%	5,779	76.9%	26,460	20,681	4,128	1,441									543	53,253
Great Grimsby	HUM	YTH	Lab	Lab	25,765	59.8%	16,244	66.3%	25,765	9,521	7,810											43,096
Great Yarmouth	NFK	E	Con	Lab	26,084	53.4%	8,668	71.3%	26,084	17,416	5,381											48,881
Greenock and Inverclyde	SCT	SCT		Lab	19,480	56.2%	13,040	70.8%	19,480	3,976	4,791		6,440									34,687
Greenwich and Woolwich	LND	LND		Lab	25,630	63.4%	18,128	65.9%	25,630	7,502	5,049	1,670									552	40,403
Guildford	SRY	SE	Con	Con	24,230	42.5%	4,791	74.6%	9,945	24,230	19,439	2,650							400		294	56,958
Hackney North and Stoke Newington	LND	LND	Lab	Lab	21,110	65.2%	15,627	52.0%	21,110	5,483	3,306	544								1,395	544	32,382
Hackney South and Shoreditch	LND	LND	Lab	Lab	20,048	59.4%	14,990	54.5%	20,048	4,494	5,058	613									3,549	33,762
Halesowen and Rowley Regis	WMD	WM		Lab	26,366	54.1%	10,337	73.6%	26,366	16,029	4,169	1,244								361	592	48,761
Halifax	WYK	YTH	Lab	Lab	27,465	54.3%	11,212	70.5%	27,465	16,253	6,059								779			50,556
Haltemprice and Howden	HUM	YTH	Con	Con	21,809	44.0%	7,514	75.5%	11,701	21,809	14,295	1,370							301		74	49,550
Halton	CHS	NW	Lab	Lab	31,497	70.9%	23,650	68.3%	31,497	7,847	3,263	1,036									796	44,439
Hamilton North and Bellshill	SCT	SCT		Lab	24,322	64.0%	17,067	70.9%	24,322	3,944	1,719	554	7,255									37,999
Hamilton South	SCT	SCT		Lab	21,709	65.6%	15,878	71.1%	21,709	2,858	1,693	316	5,831								684	33,091
Hammersmith and Fulham	LND	LND		Lab	25,262	46.8%	3,842	68.7%	25,262	21,420	4,727	1,023							183	562	848	54,025
Hampstead and Highgate	LND	LND	Lab	Lab	25,275	57.4%	13,284	67.9%	25,275	11,991	5,481	667							123		494	44,031
Harborough	LEI	EM	Con	Con	22,170	41.8%	6,524	75.3%	13,332	22,170	15,646	1,859										53,007
Harlow	ESS	E	Con	Lab	25,861	54.1%	10,514	74.3%	25,861	15,347	4,523	1,422							340		319	47,812
Harrogate and Knaresborough	NYK	YTH		LD	24,558	51.5%	6,236	73.1%	18,322	4,151	24,558										614	47,645
Harrow East	LND	LND	Con	Lab	29,962	52.5%	9,737	71.3%	29,962	20,189	4,697	1,537							464		171	57,020
Harrow West	LND	LND	Con	Lab	21,811	41.5%	1,240	72.8%	21,811	20,571	8,127	1,997										52,506
Hartlepool	CLV	NE	Lab	Lab	26,997	60.7%	17,508	65.6%	26,997	9,489	6,248	1,718										44,452
Harwich	ESS	E	Con	Lab	20,740	38.8%	1,216	70.6%	20,740	19,524	7,037	4,923									1,290	53,514
Hastings and Rye	SXE	SE	Con	Lab	16,867	34.4%	2,560	69.7%	16,867	14,307	13,717	2,511							472		1,195	49,069
Havant	HAM	SE	Con	Con	19,204	39.7%	3,729	70.4%	15,475	19,204	10,806	2,395									442	48,322
Hayes and Harlington	LND	LND	Con	Lab	25,458	62.0%	14,291	72.3%	25,458	11,167	3,049	778									639	41,091
Hazel Grove	GTM	NW	Con	LD	26,883	54.5%	11,814	77.3%	5,882	15,069	26,883	1,055							268		183	49,340
Hemel Hempstead	HRT	E		Lab	25,175	45.7%	3,636	76.6%	25,175	21,539	6,789	1,327									262	55,092
Hemsworth	WYK	YTH	Lab	Lab	32,088	70.6%	23,992	67.9%	32,088	8,096	4,033	1,260										45,477
Hendon	LND	LND		Lab	24,683	49.3%	6,155	65.7%	24,683	18,528	5,427	978							267		153	50,036
Henley	OXF	SE	Con	Con	23,908	46.4%	11,167	77.6%	11,700	23,908	12,741	2,299								514	381	51,543
Hereford	HWR	WM	Con	LD	25,198	47.9%	6,648	75.2%	6,596	18,550	25,198	2,209										52,553
Hertford and Stortford	HRT	E	Con	Con	24,027	44.1%	6,885	75.4%	17,142	24,027	9,679	2,105							1,233		259	54,445
Hertsmere	HRT	E	Con	Con	22,305	44.3%	3,075	74.0%	19,230	22,305	6,466	1,703							453		191	50,348
Hexham	NBL	NE	Con	Con	17,701	38.8%	222	77.5%	17,479	17,701	7,959	1,362							1,170			45,671
Heywood and Middleton	GTM	NW	Lab	Lab	29,179	57.7%	17,542	68.4%	29,179	11,637	7,908	1,076									750	50,550
High Peak	DBY	EM	Con	Lab	29,052	50.8%	8,791	78.9%	29,052	20,261	6,420	1,420										57,153
Hitchin and Harpenden	HRT	E		Con	24,038	45.9%	6,671	78.0%	17,367	24,038	10,515										507	52,427
Holborn and St Pancras	LND	LND	Con	Lab	24,707	65.0%	17,903	60.3%	24,707	6,804	4,758	790									946	38,005
Hornchurch	LND	LND	Con	Lab	22,066	50.2%	5,680	72.8%	22,066	16,386	3,446	1,595									448	43,941
Hornsey and Wood Green	LND	LND	Lab	Lab	31,792	61.7%	20,499	69.1%	31,792	11,293	5,794	808								1,214	586	51,487
Horsham	WSX	SE	Con	Con	29,015	50.7%	14,862	75.3%	10,691	29,015	14,153	2,281							819		206	57,165
Houghton and Washington East	TWR	NE	Lab	Lab	31,946	76.4%	26,555	62.1%	31,946	5,391	3,209	1,277										41,823
Hove	SXE	SE	Con	Lab	21,458	44.6%	3,959	69.6%	21,458	17,499	4,645	1,931							209	644	1,735	48,121
Houghton and Washington East	TWR	NE	Lab	Lab	31,946	76.4%	26,555	62.1%	31,946	5,391	3,209	1,277										41,823
Huddersfield	WYK	YTH	Lab	Lab	25,171	56.5%	15,848	67.0%	25,171	9,323	7,642	1,480								938		44,554
Huntingdon	CAM	E	Con	Con	31,501	55.3%	18,140	74.9%	13,361	31,501	8,390	3,114							331		266	56,963
Hyndburn	LAN	NW	Lab	Lab	26,831	55.6%	11,548	72.3%	26,831	15,383	4,141	1,627									290	48,272
Ilford North	LND	LND	Con	Lab	23,135	47.4%	3,224	72.7%	23,135	19,911	5,049										755	48,850
Ilford South	LND	LND	Lab	Lab	29,273	58.5%	14,200	70.2%	29,273	15,073	3,152	1,073									1,448	50,019
Inverness East, Nairn and Lochaber	SCT	SCT		Lab	16,187	33.9%	2,339	72.1%	16,187	8,355	8,364	436	13,848							354	224	47,768
Ipswich	SFK	E	Lab	Lab	25,484	52.7%	10,436	72.2%	25,484	15,048	5,881	1,637							208		107	48,365
Isle of Wight	IOW	SE	Con	LD	31,274	42.7%	6,406	72.0%	9,646	24,868	31,274	4,734							1,072	544	1,021	73,159
Islington North	LND	LND	Lab	Lab	24,834	69.3%	19,955	62.5%	24,834	4,631	4,879									1,516		35,860
Islington South and Finsbury	LND	LND	Lab	Lab	22,079	62.5%	14,563	63.7%	22,079	4,587	7,516	741									393	35,316
Islwyn	GNT	WLS	Lab	Lab	26,995	74.2%	23,391	72.0%	26,995	2,864	3,064	1,209				2,272						36,404
Jarrow	TWR	NE	Lab	Lab	28,497	64.9%	21,933	68.7%	28,497	6,564	4,865	1,034									2,982	43,942
Keighley	TWR	NE	Con	Lab	26,039	50.6%	7,132	76.6%	26,039	18,907	5,064	1,470										50,010
Kensington and Chelsea	LND	LND		Con	19,887	53.6%	9,519	54.7%	10,368	19,887	5,668								540		625	37,088
Kettering	NTH	EM	Con	Lab	24,650	43.3%	189	75.5%	24,650	24,461	6,098	1,551									197	56,957
Kilmarnock and Loudoun	SCT	SCT	Lab	Lab	23,621	49.8%	7,256	77.1%	23,621	5,125	1,891	284	16,365								123	43,942
Kingston and Surbiton	LND	LND		LD	20,411	36.7%	56	75.4%	12,811	20,355	20,411	1,470							418		200	55,665
Kingston upon Hull East	HUM	YTH	Lab	Lab	28,870	71.3%	23,318	58.9%	28,870	5,552	3,965	1,788									311	40,486
Kingston upon Hull North	HUM	YTH	Lab	Lab	25,542	65.8%	19,705	57.0%	25,542	5,837	5,667	1,533									215	38,794
Kingston upon Hull West and Hessle	HUM	YTH		Lab	22,520	58.7%	15,525	58.3%	22,520	6,933	6,995	1,596									310	38,354
Kingswood	AVN	SW	Lab	Lab	32,181	53.7%	14,253	77.6%	32,181	17,928	7,672	1,463									643	59,887
Kirkcaldy	SCT	SCT	Lab	Lab	18,730	53.6%	10,710	66.5%	18,730	4,779	3,031	413	8,020									34,973
Knowsley North and Sefton East	MSY	NW		Lab	34,747	69.9%	26,147	70.1%	34,747	8,600	5,499										857	49,703
Knowsley South	MSY	NW	Lab	Lab	36,695	77.1%	30,708	67.5%	36,695	5,987	3,954	954										47,590
Lagan Valley	NIR	NIR	UUP	UUP	24,560	55.4%	16,925	62.1%		1,212				24,560	3,436		6,005	1,110			7,987	44,310
Lancaster and Wyre	LAN	NW		Lab	25,173	42.8%	1,295	74.8%	25,173	23,878	6,802	1,516							698	795		58,862
Leeds Central	WYK	YTH	Lab	Lab	25,766	69.6%	20,689	54.7%	25,766	5,077	4,164	1,042									960	37,009
Leeds East	WYK	YTH	Lab	Lab	24,151	67.5%	17,466	62.8%	24,151	6,685	3,689	1,267										35,792
Leeds North East	WYK	YTH	Con	Lab	22,368	49.2%	6,959	71.8%	22,368	15,409	6,318	946									468	45,509
Leeds North West	WYK	YTH	Con	Lab	19,694	39.9%	3,844	69.7%	19,694	15,850	11,689	1,325									818	46,376
Leeds West	WYK	YTH	Lab	Lab	26,819	66.7%	19,771	62.9%	26,819	7,048	3,622	1,210								896	625	40,220
Leicester East	LEI	EM	Lab	Lab	29,083	65.5%	18,422	69.1%	29,083	10,661	3,105	1,015									538	44,402
Leicester South	LEI	EM	Lab	Lab	27,914	58.0%	16,493	66.3%	27,914	11,421	6,654	1,184									941	48,194
Leicester West	LEI	EM	Lab	Lab	22,580	55.2%	12,864	63.1%	22,580	9,716	5,795	970								586	1,267	40,914
Leigh	GTM	NW	Lab	Lab	31,652	68.9%	24,496	65.7%	31,652	7,156	5,163	1,949										45,920
Leominster	HWR	WM	Con	Con	22,888	45.3%	8,835	76.6%	8,831	22,888	14,053	2,815							1,086	588	292	50,553
Lewes	SXE	SE	Con	LD	21,250	43.2%	1,300	76.4%	5,232	19,950	21,250	2,481							256			49,169
Lewisham Deptford	LND	LND	Lab	Lab	23,827	70.8%	18,878	57.9%	23,827	4,949	3,004	868									996	33,644
Lewisham East	LND	LND	Lab	Lab	21,821	58.3%	12,127	66.4%	21,821	9,694	4,178	910									805	37,408
Lewisham West	LND	LND	Lab	Lab	23,273	62.0%	14,317	64.0%	23,273	8,956	3,672	1,098									565	37,564
Leyton and Wanstead	LND	LND		Lab	23,922	60.8%	15,186	63.2%	23,922	8,736	5,920										744	39,322
Lichfield	STS	WM		Con	20,853	42.9%	238	77.5%	20,615	20,853	5,473	1,652										48,593
Lincoln	LIN	EM	Con	Lab	25,563	54.9%	11,130	71.1%	25,563	14,433	5,048	1,329									175	46,548
Linlithgow	SCT	SCT	Lab	Lab	21,469	54.1%	10,838	73.8%	21,469	4,964	3,796	259	10,631									39,654
Liverpool Garston	MSY	NW	Lab	Lab	26,667	61.3%	18,417	65.0%	26,667	6,819	8,250	833									913	43,482
Liverpool Riverside	MSY	NW	Lab	Lab	26,858	70.4%	21,799	51.6%	26,858	3,635	5,059	586									1,997	38,135
Liverpool Walton	MSY	NW	Lab	Lab	31,516	78.4%	27,038	59.5%	31,516	2,551	4,478	620									1,042	40,207
Liverpool Wavertree	MSY	NW		Lab	29,592	64.4%	19,701	62.7%	29,592	4,944	9,891	576									915	45,918
Liverpool West Derby	MSY	NW	Lab	Lab	30,002	71.2%	25,965	61.3%	30,002	3,656	3,805	657									4,037	42,157
Livingston	SCT	SCT	Lab	Lab	23,510	54.9%	11,747	71.0%	23,510	4,028	2,876	444	11,763								213	42,834
Llanelli	DFD	WLS	Lab	Lab	28,851	57.9%	21,039	70.7%	28,851	5,003	3,788					7,812					757	41,211
Loughborough	LEI	EM	Con	Lab	25,448	48.6%	5,712	75.9%	25,448	19,736	6,190	991										52,365
Louth and Horncastle	LIN	EM		Con	21,699	43.4%	6,900	72.6%	14,799	21,699	12,207									1,248		49,953
Ludlow	SAL	WM	Con	Con	19,633	42.4%	5,909	75.5%	11,745	19,633	13,724								385	798		46,285
Luton North	BDF	E	Con	Lab	25,860	54.6%	9,626	73.2%	25,860	16,234	4,299								689		250	47,332
Luton South	BDF	E	Con	Lab	26,428	54.8%	11,319	70.4%	26,428	15,109	4,610	1,205							390	356	86	48,184
Macclesfield	CHS	NW	Con	Con	26,888	49.6%	8,654	75.2%	18,234	26,888	9,075											54,197
Maidenhead	BRK	SE		Con	25,344	49.8%	11,981	75.6%	9,205	25,344	13,363	1,638							277		1,062	50,889
Maidstone and The Weald	KEN	SE		Con	23,657	44.1%	9,603	73.7%	14,054	23,657	11,986	1,998							339	480	1,094	53,608
Makerfield	GTM	NW	Lab	Lab	33,119	73.6%	26,177	66.8%	33,119	6,942	3,743	1,210										45,014
Maldon and East Chelmsford	ESS	E		Con	24,524	48.7%	10,039	77.9%	14,485	24,524	9,758								935	685		50,387
Manchester Blackley	GTM	NW	Lab	Lab	25,042	70.0%	19,588	57.2%	25,042	5,454	3,937	1,323										35,756
Manchester Central	GTM	NW	Lab	Lab	23,803	71.0%	19,682	52.6%	23,803	3,964	4,121	742									907	33,537
Manchester Gorton	GTM	NW	Lab	Lab	23,803	65.3%	17,342	55.6%	23,704	4,249	6,362	812								683	501	36,311
Manchester Withington	GTM	NW	Lab	Lab	27,103	61.5%	18,581	65.8%	27,103	8,522	6,000	1,079									1,323	44,027
Mansfield	NTT	EM	Lab	Lab	30,556	64.4%	20,518	70.7%	30,556	10,038	5,244	1,588										47,426
Medway	KEN	SE	Con	Lab	21,858	48.9%	5,354	72.3%	21,858	16,504	4,555	1,420							405			44,742
Meirionnydd Nant Conwy	CON	WLS	PC	PC	12,465	50.7%	6,805	76.0%	5,660	3,922	1,719	809				12,465						24,575
Meriden	WMD	WM	Con	Con	22,997	42.0%	582	71.7%	22,415	22,997	7,098	2,208										54,718
Merthyr Tydfil and Rhymney	GNT	WLS	Lab	Lab	30,012	76.7%	27,086	69.3%	30,012	2,508	2,926	660				2,344					691	39,141
Mid Bedfordshire	BDF	E	Con	Con	24,176	46.0%	7,090	78.9%	17,086	24,176	8,823	2,257									174	52,516
Mid Dorset and North Poole	DOR	SW		Con	20,632	40.7%	681	75.7%	8,014	20,632	19,951	2,136										50,733
Mid Norfolk	NFK	E	Con	Con	22,739	39.6%	1,336	76.3%	21,403	22,739	8,617	3,229								1,254	215	57,457
Mid Sussex	WSX	SE	Con	Con	23,231	43.5%	6,854	77.6%	9,969	23,231	16,377	3,146							606		134	53,463
Mid Ulster	NIR	NIR	DUP	SF	20,294	40.1%	1,883	85.8%							11,205		20,294	18,411			759	50,669
Mid Worcestershire	HWR	WM	Con	Con	24,092	47.4%	9,412	74.3%	14,680	24,092	9,458	1,780							646		163	50,819
Middlesbrough	CLV	NE	Lab	Lab	32,925	71.4%	25,018	65.0%	32,925	7,907	3,934	1,331										46,097
Middlesbrough South and East Cleveland	CLV	NE		Lab	29,319	54.7%	10,607	76.0%	29,319	18,712	4,004	1,552										53,587
Midlothian	SCT	SCT	Lab	Lab	18,861	53.5%	9,870	74.1%	18,861	3,842	3,235	320	8,991									35,249
Milton Keynes South West	BKM	SE	Con	Lab	27,298	53.8%	10,092	71.4%	27,298	17,006	6,065										389	50,758
Mitcham and Morden	LND	LND	Con	Lab	27,984	58.4%	13,741	73.3%	27,984	14,243	3,632	810							117	415	745	47,946
Mole Valley	SRY	SE	Con	Con	26,178	48.0%	10,221	78.4%	8,057	26,178	15,957	2,424							435		1,473	54,524
Monmouth	GNT	WLS	Con	Lab	23,404	47.7%	4,178	80.5%	23,404	19,226	4,689	1,190				516						49,025
Montgomeryshire	POW	WLS	LD	LD	14,647	45.9%	6,303	74.7%	6,109	8,344	14,647	879				1,608				338		31,925
Moray	SCT	SCT	SNP	SNP	16,529	41.6%	5,566	68.2%	7,886	10,963	3,548	840	16,529									39,766
Morecambe and Lunesdale	LAN	NW	Con	Lab	24,061	48.9%	5,965	72.3%	24,061	18,096	5,614	1,313									165	49,249
Morley and Rothwell	WYK	YTH		Lab	26,836	58.5%	14,750	67.1%	26,836	12,086	5,087	1,359									529	45,897
Motherwell and Wishaw	SCT	SCT		Lab	21,020	57.4%	12,791	70.1%	21,020	4,024	2,331	218	8,229								797	36,619
Neath	WGM	WLS	Lab	Lab	30,324	73.5%	26,741	74.3%	30,324	3,583	2,597	975				3,344					420	41,243
New Forest East	HAM	SE		Con	21,053	42.9%	5,215	74.6%	12,161	21,053	15,838											49,052
New Forest West	HAM	SE		Con	25,149	50.6%	11,332	74.7%	7,092	25,149	13,817	2,150							1,542			49,750
Newark	NTT	EM	Con	Lab	23,496	45.2%	3,016	74.5%	23,496	20,480	5,960	2,035										51,971
Newbury	BRK	SE	Con	LD	29,887	52.9%	8,517	76.3%	3,107	21,370	29,887	992							302	644	174	56,476
Newcastle upon Tyne Central	TWR	NE	Lab	Lab	27,272	59.2%	16,480	65.9%	27,272	10,792	6,911	1,113										46,088
Newcastle upon Tyne East and Wallsend	TWR	NE		Lab	29,607	71.2%	23,811	65.7%	29,607	5,796	4,415	966									805	41,589
Newcastle upon Tyne North	TWR	NE	Lab	Lab	28,125	62.2%	19,332	69.2%	28,125	8,793	6,578	1,733										45,229
Newcastle-under-Lyme	STS	WM	Lab	Lab	27,743	56.5%	17,206	73.6%	27,743	10,537	6,858	1,510									2,481	49,129
Newport East	GNT	WLS	Lab	Lab	21,481	57.7%	13,523	73.1%	21,481	7,958	3,880	1,267				721					1,951	37,258
Newport West	GNT	WLS	Lab	Lab	24,331	60.5%	14,357	74.6%	24,331	9,794	3,907	1,199				648			323			40,202
Newry and Armagh	NIR	NIR	SDLP	SDLP	22,904	43.0%	4,889	75.4%						18,015	22,904		11,218				1,138	53,275
Normanton	WYK	YTH	Lab	Lab	26,046	60.6%	15,893	68.3%	26,046	10,153	5,347	1,458										43,004
North Antrim	NIR	NIR	DUP	DUP	21,495	46.5%	10,574	63.8%						10,921	7,333		2,896	21,495			3,541	46,186
North Cornwall	CUL	SW	LD	LD	31,100	53.2%	13,847	73.1%	5,523	17,253	31,100	3,636									983	58,495
North Devon	DEV	SW	LD	LD	27,824	50.8%	6,181	77.7%	5,347	21,643	27,824											54,814
North Dorset	DOR	SW	Con	Con	23,294	44.3%	2,746	76.3%	5,380	23,294	20,548	2,564							801			52,587
North Down	NIR	NIR	UPUP	UKUP	12,817	35.1%	1,449	57.9%		1,810				11,368	1,602						21,776	36,556
North Durham	DUR	NE	Lab	Lab	33,142	70.3%	26,299	69.2%	33,142	6,843	5,225	1,958										47,168
North East Bedfordshire	BDF	E		Con	22,311	44.3%	5,883	77.2%	16,428	22,311	7,179	2,490									1,980	50,388
North East Cambridgeshire	CAM	E	Con	Con	23,855	43.0%	5,101	72.6%	18,754	23,855	9,070	2,636									1,110	55,425
North East Derbyshire	DBY	EM	Lab	Lab	31,425	60.5%	18,321	71.5%	31,425	13,104	7,450											51,979
North East Fife	SCT	SCT	LD	LD	21,432	51.2%	10,356	70.5%	4,301	11,076	21,432	485	4,545									41,839
North East Hampshire	HAM	SE		Con	26,017	50.9%	14,398	73.6%	8,203	26,017	11,619	2,420							452		2,400	51,111
North East Hertfordshire	HRT	E		Con	21,712	41.7%	3,088	77.1%	18,624	21,712	9,493	2,166										51,995
North East Milton Keynes	BKM	SE	Con	Lab	20,201	39.4%	240	72.8%	20,201	19,961	8,907	1,492								576	99	51,236
North Essex	ESS	E		Con	22,480	43.9%	5,476	75.3%	10,028	22,480	17,004								1,202	495		51,209
North Norfolk	NFK	E	Con	Con	21,456	36.5%	1,293	76.0%	14,736	21,456	20,163	2,458										58,813
North Shropshire	SAL	WM	Con	Con	20,730	40.2%	2,195	72.6%	18,535	20,730	10,489	1,764										58,813
North Southwark and Bermondsey	LND	LND		LD	19,831	48.6%	3,387	62.2%	16,444	2,835	19,831	545									1,140	40,795
North Swindon	WIL	SW		Lab	24,029	49.8%	7,688	73.7%	24,029	16,341	6,237	1,533									130	48,270
North Tayside	SCT	SCT	Con	SNP	20,447	44.8%	4,160	74.3%	5,141	16,287	3,716		20,447									45,591
North Thanet	KEN	SE	Con	Con	21,586	44.1%	2,766	68.8%	18,820	21,586	5,576	2,535							438			48,955
North Tyneside	TWR	NE		Lab	32,810	72.7%	26,643	67.9%	32,810	6,167	4,762	1,382										45,121
North Warwickshire	WAR	WM	Lab	Lab	31,669	58.4%	14,767	74.7%	31,669	16,902	4,040	917							533		178	54,239
North West Cambridgeshire	CAM	E		Con	23,488	48.1%	7,754	74.2%	15,734	23,488	7,388	1,939							269			48,818
North West Durham	DUR	NE	Lab	Lab	31,855	68.8%	24,754	68.7%	31,855	7,101	4,991	2,372										46,319
North West Hampshire	HAM	SE	Con	Con	24,730	45.3%	11,551	74.2%	12,900	24,730	13,179	1,533							1,383	486	456	54,667
North West Leicestershire	LEI	EM	Con	Lab	29,332	56.4%	13,219	80.0%	29,332	16,113	4,492	2,008										51,945
North West Norfolk	NFK	E	Con	Lab	25,250	43.8%	1,339	74.7%	25,250	23,911	5,513	2,923										57,597
North Wiltshire	WIL	SW	Con	Con	25,390	43.8%	3,475	74.9%	8,261	25,390	21,915	1,774							410		263	58,013
Northampton North	NTH	EM	Con	Lab	27,247	52.7%	10,000	70.1%	27,247	17,247	6,579								474		161	51,708
Northampton South	NTH	EM	Con	Lab	24,214	42.4%	744	71.7%	24,214	23,470	6,316	1,405							1,159		541	57,105
Northavon	AVN	SW	Con	LD	26,500	42.4%	2,137	79.2%	9,767	24,363	26,500	1,900										62,530
Norwich North	NFK	E	Con	Lab	27,346	49.7%	9,470	75.9%	27,346	17,876	6,951	1,777									1,107	55,057
Norwich South	NFK	E	Lab	Lab	26,267	51.7%	14,239	72.6%	26,267	12,028	9,457	1,464								736	849	50,801
Nottingham East	NTT	EM	Lab	Lab	24,755	62.3%	15,419	60.5%	24,755	9,336	4,008	1,645										39,744
Nottingham North	NTT	EM	Lab	Lab	27,203	65.7%	18,801	63.0%	27,203	8,402	3,301	1,858									637	41,401
Nottingham South	NTT	EM	Lab	Lab	26,825	55.3%	13,364	67.0%	26,825	13,461	6,265	1,523									446	48,520
Nuneaton	WAR	WM	Lab	Lab	30,080	56.2%	13,540	74.4%	30,080	16,540	4,732	1,533							238		390	53,513
Ochil	SCT	SCT		Lab	19,707	45.0%	4,652	77.4%	19,707	6,383	2,262	210	15,055								169	43,786
Ogmore	MGM	WLS	Lab	Lab	28,163	74.0%	24,447	72.9%	28,163	3,716	3,510					2,679						38,068
Old Bexley and Sidcup	LND	LND	Con	Con	21,608	42.1%	3,569	75.5%	18,039	21,608	8,284	2,457							489		514	51,391
Oldham East and Saddleworth	GTM	NW		Lab	22,546	41.7%	3,389	73.9%	22,546	10,666	19,157	1,116									616	54,101
Oldham West and Royton	GTM	NW		Lab	26,894	58.8%	16,201	66.1%	26,894	10,693	5,434	1,157									1,560	45,738
Orkney and Shetland	SCT	SCT	LD	LD	10,743	52.0%	6,968	64.0%	3,775	2,527	10,743	820	2,624								176	20,665
Orpington	LND	LND	Con	Con	24,417	40.6%	2,952	76.3%	10,753	24,417	21,465	2,316							526		685	60,162
Oxford East	OXF	SE	Lab	Lab	27,205	56.8%	16,665	68.4%	27,205	10,540	7,038	1,391							234	975	494	47,877
Oxford West and Abingdon	OXF	SE	Con	LD	26,268	42.9%	6,285	78.0%	12,361	19,983	26,268	1,258							258	691	377	61,196
Paisley North	SCT	SCT	Lab	Lab	20,295	59.5%	12,814	68.6%	20,295	3,267	2,365	196	7,481								531	34,135
Paisley South	SCT	SCT	Lab	Lab	21,482	57.5%	12,750	69.1%	21,482	3,237	3,500	254	8,732								146	37,351
Pendle	LAN	NW	Lab	Lab	25,059	53.3%	10,824	74.6%	25,059	14,235	5,460	2,281										47,035
Penrith and The Border	CMA	NW	Con	Con	23,300	47.6%	10,233	73.6%	10,576	23,300	13,067	2,018										48,961
Perth	SCT	SCT		SNP	16,209	36.4%	3,141	73.9%	11,036	13,068	3,583	366	16,209						289			44,551
Peterborough	CAM	E	Con	Lab	24,365	50.3%	7,323	72.8%	24,365	17,042	5,170	924							317		609	48,427
Plymouth Devonport	DEV	SW	Lab	Lab	31,629	60.9%	19,067	69.8%	31,629	12,562	5,570	1,486							478		238	51,963
Plymouth Sutton	DEV	SW	Con	Lab	23,881	50.1%	9,440	67.4%	23,881	14,441	6,613	1,654							499		564	47,652
Pontefract and Castleford	WYK	YTH	Lab	Lab	31,339	75.7%	25,725	66.3%	31,339	5,614	3,042	1,401										41,396
Pontypridd	MGM	WLS	Lab	Lab	29,290	63.9%	23,129	71.4%	29,290	5,910	6,161	874				2,977					643	45,855
Poole	DOR	SW	Con	Con	19,726	42.1%	5,298	71.0%	10,100	19,726	14,428	1,932							487		137	46,810
Poplar and Canning Town	LND	LND		Lab	24,807	63.2%	18,915	58.5%	24,807	5,892	4,072	1,091									3,400	39,262
Portsmouth North	HAM	SE	Con	Lab	21,339	47.1%	4,323	70.1%	21,339	17,016	4,788	1,757							298		72	45,270
Portsmouth South	HAM	SE	Con	LD	20,421	39.5%	4,327	63.8%	13,086	16,094	20,421	1,629							141		324	51,695
Preseli Pembrokeshire	DFD	WLS		Lab	20,477	48.3%	8,736	78.3%	20,477	11,741	5,527	1,574				2,683				401		42,403
Preston	LAN	NW	Lab	Lab	29,220	60.8%	18,680	65.8%	29,220	10,540	7,045	924									345	48,074
Pudsey	WYK	YTH	Con	Lab	25,370	48.1%	6,207	74.3%	25,370	19,163	7,375	823										52,731
Putney	LND	LND	Con	Lab	20,084	45.6%	2,976	73.3%	20,084	17,108	4,739	1,518							233		313	43,995
Rayleigh	ESS	E		Con	25,516	49.7%	10,684	74.3%	14,832	25,516	10,137										829	51,314
Reading East	BRK	SE	Con	Lab	21,461	42.7%	3,795	70.2%	21,461	17,666	9,307	1,042							252		492	50,220
Reading West	BRK	SE	Con	Lab	21,841	45.1%	2,997	70.1%	21,841	18,844	6,153	976							255		320	48,389
Redcar	CLV	NE	Lab	Lab	32,972	67.3%	21,664	71.0%	32,972	11,308	4,679											48,859
Redditch	HWR	WM		Lab	22,280	49.8%	6,125	73.5%	22,280	16,155	4,935	1,151									227	44,748
Regent's Park and Kensington North	LND	LND		Lab	28,367	59.9%	14,657	64.2%	28,367	13,710	4,041	867									359	47,344
Reigate	SRY	SE	Con	Con	21,123	43.8%	7,741	74.4%	13,382	21,123	9,615	3,352							290		412	48,174
Rhondda	MGM	WLS	Lab	Lab	30,381	74.5%	24,931	71.5%	30,381	1,551	2,307	658				5,450				460		40,807
Ribble Valley	LAN	NW	Con	Con	26,702	46.7%	6,640	78.5%	9,013	26,702	20,062	1,297									147	57,221
Richmond Park	LND	LND		LD	25,393	44.7%	2,951	79.0%	7,172	22,442	25,393	1,467									379	56,853
Richmond (Yorks)	NYK	YTH	Con	Con	23,326	48.9%	10,051	73.4%	13,275	23,326	8,773	2,367										47,741
Rochdale	GTM	NW	LD	Lab	23,758	49.4%	4,545	70.0%	23,758	4,237	19,213										874	48,082
Rochford and Southend East	ESS	E		Con	22,683	48.7%	4,225	63.7%	18,458	22,683	4,387										1,007	46,535
Romford	LND	LND	Con	Lab	18,187	43.2%	649	71.1%	18,187	17,538	3,341	1,431									1,622	42,119
Romsey	HAM	SE	Con	Con	23,834	46.0%	8,585	76.4%	9,623	23,834	15,249	1,294							1,824			51,821
Ross, Skye and Inverness West	SCT	SCT		LD	15,472	38.7%	4,019	71.6%	11,453	4,368	15,472	535	7,821							306		39,955
Rossendale and Darwen	LAN	NW	Lab	Lab	27,470	53.6%	10,949	73.0%	27,470	16,521	5,435	1,108									674	51,208
Rother Valley	SYK	YTH	Lab	Lab	31,184	67.6%	23,485	67.3%	31,184	7,699	5,342	1,932										46,157
Rotherham	SYK	YTH	Lab	Lab	26,852	71.3%	21,469	62.9%	26,852	5,383	3,919	1,132									364	37,650
Roxburgh and Berwickshire	SCT	SCT	LD	LD	16,243	46.5%	7,906	73.9%	5,226	8,337	16,243	922	3,959						202		42	34,931
Rugby and Kenilworth	WAR	WM	Con	Lab	26,356	43.0%	495	77.1%	26,356	25,861	8,737										251	61,205
Ruislip-Northwood	LND	LND	Con	Con	22,526	50.2%	7,794	74.2%	14,732	22,526	7,279										296	44,833
Runnymede and Weybridge	SRY	SE		Con	25,051	48.6%	9,875	71.5%	15,176	25,051	8,397	2,150							625		162	51,561
Rushcliffe	NTT	EM	Con	Con	27,558	44.4%	5,055	78.8%	22,503	27,558	8,851	2,682							403		115	62,112
Rutland and Melton	LEI	EM	Con	Con	24,107	45.8%	8,836	75.0%	15,271	24,107	10,112	2,317							823			52,630
Ryedale	NYK	YTH	Con	Con	21,351	43.8%	5,038	74.8%	8,762	21,351	16,293	1,460							917			48,783
Saffron Walden	ESS	E	Con	Con	25,871	45.3%	10,573	76.9%	12,275	25,871	15,298	2,308							658		640	57,050
Salford	GTM	NW		Lab	22,848	69.0%	17,069	56.3%	22,848	5,779	3,407	926									162	33,122
Salisbury	WIL	SW	Con	Con	25,012	43.0%	6,276	73.6%	10,242	25,012	18,736								3,332	623	294	58,239
Scarborough and Whitby	NYK	YTH		Lab	24,791	45.6%	5,124	71.6%	24,791	19,667	7,672	2,191										54,321
Scunthorpe	HUM	YTH		Lab	25,107	60.4%	14,173	68.8%	25,107	10,934	3,497	1,637									399	41,574
Sedgefield	DUR	NE	Lab	Lab	33,526	71.2%	25,143	72.6%	33,526	8,383	3,050	1,683									474	47,116
Selby	NYK	YTH	Con	Lab	25,838	45.9%	3,836	74.7%	25,838	22,002	6,778	1,162							536			56,316
Sevenoaks	KEN	SE	Con	Con	22,776	45.4%	10,461	75.4%	12,315	22,776	12,086	2,138								443	391	50,149
Sheffield Attercliffe	SYK	YTH	Lab	Lab	28,937	65.3%	21,818	64.7%	28,937	7,119	6,973	1,289										44,318
Sheffield Brightside	SYK	YTH	Lab	Lab	24,901	73.5%	19,954	57.5%	24,901	2,850	4,947	624									543	33,865
Sheffield Central	SYK	YTH	Lab	Lab	23,179	63.6%	16,906	53.0%	23,179	4,341	6,273	863								954	809	36,419
Sheffield Hallam	SYK	YTH	Con	LD	23,345	51.3%	8,271	72.4%	6,147	15,074	23,345	788									125	45,479
Sheffield Heeley	SYK	YTH	Lab	Lab	26,274	60.7%	17,078	65.0%	26,274	6,767	9,196	1,029										43,266
Sheffield Hillsborough	SYK	YTH	Lab	Lab	30,150	56.9%	16,451	71.0%	30,150	7,707	13,699	1,468										53,024
Sherwood	NTT	EM	Lab	Lab	33,071	58.5%	16,812	75.6%	33,071	16,259	4,889	1,882									432	56,533
Shipley	WYK	YTH	Con	Lab	22,962	43.3%	2,966	76.3%	22,962	19,996	7,984	1,960										52,902
Shrewsbury and Atcham	SAL	WM	Con	Lab	20,484	37.0%	1,670	75.3%	20,484	18,814	13,838	1,346							477		385	55,344
Sittingbourne and Sheppey	KEN	SE		Lab	18,723	40.6%	1,929	72.3%	18,723	16,794	8,447	1,082							472		644	46,162
Skipton and Ripon	NYK	YTH	Con	Con	25,736	52.4%	12,930	66.1%	8,543	25,736	12,806								2,041			49,126
Sleaford and North Hykeham	LIN	EM		Con	23,358	43.9%	5,123	74.2%	18,235	23,358	8,063	2,942									578	53,176
Slough	BRK	SE	Con	Lab	27,029	56.6%	13,071	67.9%	27,029	13,958	3,509	1,124									2,112	47,732
Solihull	WMD	WM	Con	Con	26,299	44.6%	11,397	74.6%	14,334	26,299	14,902	2,748									623	58,906
Somerton and Frome	SOM	SW	Con	LD	22,684	39.5%	130	77.3%	9,385	22,554	22,684	2,449							331			57,403
South Antrim	NIR	NIR	UUP	UUP	23,108	57.5%	16,611	57.8%						23,108	6,497		2,229				8,361	40,195
South Cambridgeshire	CAM	E		Con	22,572	42.0%	8,712	76.9%	13,485	22,572	13,860	3,300							298		168	53,683
South Derbyshire	DBY	EM	Con	Lab	32,709	54.5%	13,967	78.2%	32,709	18,742	5,408	2,491							617			59,967
South Dorset	DOR	SW	Con	Con	17,755	36.1%	77	74.0%	17,755	17,678	9,936	2,791							861		161	49,182
South Down	NIR	NIR	SDLP	SDLP	26,181	52.9%	9,933	70.8%						16,248	26,181		5,127				1,930	49,486
South East Cambridgeshire	CAM	E	Con	Con	24,397	42.9%	9,349	75.1%	15,048	24,397	14,246	2,838									278	56,807
South East Cornwall	CUL	SW	Con	LD	27,044	47.1%	6,480	75.7%	7,358	20,564	27,044								1,428		1,038	57,432
South Holland and the Deepings	LIN	EM		Con	24,691	49.3%	7,991	72.0%	16,700	24,691	7,836										902	50,129
South Norfolk	NFK	E	Con	Con	24,935	40.2%	7,378	78.4%	16,188	24,935	17,557	2,533							400	484		62,097
South Ribble	LAN	NW	Con	Lab	25,856	46.8%	5,084	77.1%	25,856	20,772	5,879	1,475									1,249	55,231
South Shields	TWR	NE	Lab	Lab	27,834	71.4%	22,153	62.5%	27,834	5,681	3,429	1,660									374	38,978
South Staffordshire	STS	WM	Con	Con	25,568	50.0%	7,821	74.2%	17,747	25,568	5,797	2,002										51,114
South Suffolk	SFK	E	Con	Con	19,402	37.3%	4,175	77.2%	15,227	19,402	14,395	2,740									211	51,975
South Swindon	WIL	SW		Lab	23,943	46.8%	5,645	72.9%	23,943	18,298	7,371	1,273									277	51,162
South Thanet	KEN	SE	Con	Lab	20,777	46.2%	2,878	71.6%	20,777	17,899	5,263									418	631	44,988
South West Bedfordshire	BDF	E	Con	Con	21,534	40.7%	132	75.8%	21,402	21,534	7,559	1,761							446		162	52,864
South West Devon	DEV	SW		Con	22,659	42.9%	7,397	76.2%	15,262	22,659	12,542	1,668							491		159	52,781
South West Hertfordshire	HRT	E	Con	Con	25,462	46.0%	10,021	77.3%	15,441	25,462	12,381	1,853									274	55,411
South West Norfolk	NFK	E	Con	Con	24,694	42.0%	2,464	73.1%	22,230	24,694	8,178	3,694										58,796
South West Surrey	SRY	SE	Con	Con	25,165	44.6%	2,694	77.5%	5,333	25,165	22,471	2,830							401		258	56,458
Southampton Itchen	HAM	SE	Lab	Lab	29,498	54.8%	14,220	70.0%	29,498	15,269	6,289	1,660							172		950	53,838
Southampton Test	HAM	SE	Con	Lab	28,396	54.1%	13,684	71.9%	28,396	14,712	7,171	1,397							219		546	52,441
Southend West	ESS	E	Con	Con	18,029	38.8%	2,615	70.0%	10,600	18,029	15,414	1,734							636		101	46,514
Southport	MSY	NW	Con	LD	24,356	48.1%	6,170	72.1%	6,129	18,186	24,356	1,368									571	50,610
Spelthorne	SRY	SE	Con	Con	23,306	44.9%	3,473	73.6%	19,833	23,306	6,821	1,495							462			51,917
St Albans	HRT	E	Con	Lab	21,338	42.0%	4,459	77.5%	21,338	16,879	10,692	1,619									277	50,805
St Helens North	MSY	NW	Lab	Lab	31,953	64.9%	23,417	68.9%	31,953	8,536	6,270	1,276							363		833	49,231
St Helens South	MSY	NW	Lab	Lab	30,367	68.6%	23,739	66.5%	30,367	6,628	5,919	1,165									179	44,258
St Ives	CUL	SW	Con	LD	23,966	44.5%	7,170	75.2%	8,184	16,796	23,966	3,714							567		674	53,901
Stafford	STS	WM	Con	Lab	24,606	47.5%	4,314	76.6%	24,606	20,292	5,480	1,146									248	51,772
Staffordshire Moorlands	STS	WM	Con	Lab	26,686	52.2%	10,049	77.8%	26,686	16,637	6,191	1,603										51,117
Stalybridge and Hyde	GTM	NW	Lab	Lab	25,363	58.9%	14,806	65.7%	25,363	10,557	5,169	1,992										43,081
Stevenage	HRT	E	Con	Lab	28,440	55.3%	11,582	76.6%	28,440	16,858	4,588	1,194									306	51,386
Stirling	SCT	SCT	Con	Lab	20,382	47.4%	6,411	81.8%	20,382	13,971	2,675		5,752						154			42,958
Stockport	GTM	NW	Lab	Lab	29,338	62.9%	18,912	71.3%	29,338	10,426	4,951	1,280									674	46,669
Stockton North	CLV	NE	Lab	Lab	29,726	66.8%	21,357	69.0%	29,726	8,369	4,816	1,563										44,474
Stockton South	CLV	NE	Con	Lab	28,790	55.2%	11,585	75.9%	28,790	17,205	4,721	1,400										52,116
Stoke-on-Trent Central	STS	WM	Lab	Lab	26,662	66.2%	19,924	62.8%	26,662	6,738	4,809	1,071									965	40,245
Stoke-on-Trent North	STS	WM	Lab	Lab	25,190	65.2%	17,392	65.3%	25,190	7,798	4,141	1,537										38,664
Stoke-on-Trent South	STS	WM	Lab	Lab	28,645	62.0%	18,303	66.1%	28,645	10,342	4,710	1,103									1,436	46,236
Stone	STS	WM		Con	24,859	46.8%	3,818	77.8%	21,041	24,859	6,392										782	53,074
Stourbridge	WMD	WM		Lab	23,452	47.2%	5,645	76.5%	23,452	17,807	7,123	1,319										49,701
Strangford	NIR	NIR	UUP	UUP	18,431	44.3%	5,852	59.5%		1,743				18,431	2,775		503	12,579			5,588	41,619
Stratford-on-Avon	WAR	WM	Con	Con	29,967	48.3%	14,016	76.3%	12,754	29,967	15,861	2,064							556		897	62,099
Strathkelvin and Bearsden	SCT	SCT	Lab	Lab	26,278	52.9%	16,292	78.8%	26,278	9,986	4,843	339	8,111								155	49,712
Streatham	LND	LND	Lab	Lab	28,181	62.8%	18,423	60.2%	28,181	9,758	6,082	864										44,885
Stretford and Urmston	GTM	NW		Lab	28,480	58.5%	13,640	69.7%	28,480	14,840	3,978	1,397										48,695
Stroud	GLS	SW	Con	Lab	26,170	42.7%	2,910	79.2%	26,170	23,260	9,502									2,415		61,347
Suffolk Coastal	SFK	E	Con	Con	21,696	38.6%	3,254	75.8%	18,442	21,696	12,036	3,416								514	152	56,256
Sunderland North	TWR	NE	Lab	Lab	26,067	68.2%	19,697	59.1%	26,067	6,370	3,973	1,394									409	38,213
Sunderland South	TWR	NE	Lab	Lab	27,174	68.1%	19,638	58.8%	27,174	7,536	4,606								609			39,925
Surrey Heath	SRY	SE		Con	28,231	51.6%	16,287	74.1%	11,511	28,231	11,944	2,385							653			54,724
Sutton and Cheam	LND	LND	Con	LD	19,919	42.3%	2,097	74.9%	7,280	17,822	19,919	1,784							191		96	47,092
Sutton Coldfield	WMD	WM	Con	Con	27,373	52.2%	14,885	72.9%	12,488	27,373	10,139	2,401										52,401
Swansea East	WGM	WLS	Lab	Lab	29,151	75.4%	25,569	67.4%	29,151	3,582	3,440	904				1,308					289	38,674
Swansea West	WGM	WLS	Lab	Lab	22,748	56.2%	14,459	67.6%	22,748	8,289	5,872					2,675					885	40,469
Tamworth	STS	WM		Lab	25,808	51.8%	7,496	74.2%	25,808	18,312	4,025	1,163							369		177	49,854
Tatton	CHS	NW	Con	Ind	29,354	60.2%	11,077	76.1%		18,277											30,512	49,854
Taunton	SOM	SW	Con	LD	26,064	42.7%	2,443	76.5%	8,248	23,621	26,064	2,760									318	61,011
Teignbridge	DEV	SW	Con	Con	24,679	39.2%	281	77.1%	11,311	24,679	24,398								1,601	817	139	62,945
Telford	SAL	WM		Lab	21,456	57.8%	11,290	65.6%	21,456	10,166	4,371	1,119										37,112
Tewkesbury	GLS	SW		Con	23,859	45.8%	9,234	76.5%	13,665	23,859	14,625											52,147
The Wrekin	SAL	WM	Lab	Lab	21,243	46.9%	3,025	76.6%	21,243	18,218	5,807											45,268
Thurrock	ESS	E	Lab	Lab	29,896	63.3%	17,256	65.6%	29,896	12,640	3,843								833			47,212
Tiverton and Honiton	DEV	SW		Con	24,438	41.3%	1,653	77.6%	7,598	24,438	22,785	2,952								485	871	59,129
Tonbridge and Malling	KEN	SE	Con	Con	23,640	48.0%	10,230	75.8%	13,410	23,640	9,467	2,005							502		205	49,229
Tooting	LND	LND	Lab	Lab	27,516	59.7%	15,011	69.4%	27,516	12,505	4,320	829								527	408	46,105
Torbay	DEV	SW	Con	LD	21,094	39.6%	12	73.8%	7,923	21,082	21,094								1,962		1,261	53,322
Torfaen	GNT	WLS	Lab	Lab	29,863	69.1%	24,536	71.7%	29,863	5,327	5,249	1,245				1,042				519		43,245
Torridge and West Devon	DEV	SW	Con	LD	24,744	41.8%	1,957	77.9%	7,319	22,787	24,744	1,946							1,841		508	59,145
Totnes	DEV	SW		Con	19,637	36.5%	877	75.8%	8,796	19,637	18,760	2,552							999	548	2,477	53,769
Tottenham	LND	LND	Lab	Lab	26,121	69.3%	20,200	56.9%	26,121	5,921	4,064									1,059	539	37,704
Truro and St Austell	CUL	SW		LD	27,502	48.5%	12,501	74.0%	8,697	15,001	27,502	3,682							576	482	807	56,747
Tunbridge Wells	KEN	SE	Con	Con	21,853	45.2%	7,506	74.1%	9,879	21,853	14,347	1,858							264		153	48,354
Tweeddale, Ettrick and Lauderdale	SCT	SCT	LD	LD	12,178	31.2%	1,489	76.3%	10,689	8,623	12,178	406	6,671								434	39,001
Twickenham	LND	LND	Con	LD	26,237	45.1%	4,281	79.3%	9,065	21,956	26,237										886	58,144
Tyne Bridge	TWR	NE	Lab	Lab	26,767	76.8%	22,906	57.1%	26,767	3,861	2,785	919									518	34,850
Tynemouth	TWR	NE	Lab	Lab	28,318	55.4%	11,273	77.1%	28,318	17,045	4,509	819							462			51,153
Upminster	LND	LND	Con	Lab	19,095	46.2%	2,770	72.3%	19,095	16,315	3,919	2,000										41,319
Upper Bann	NIR	NIR	UUP	UUP	20,836	43.6%	9,252	67.8%		433				20,836	11,584		5,773	5,483			3,679	47,787
Uxbridge	LND	LND	Con	Con	18,095	43.5%	724	72.3%	17,371	18,095	4,528	1,153									398	41,545
Vale of Clwyd	CON	WLS		Lab	20,617	52.7%	8,995	74.6%	20,617	11,662	3,425	834				2,301			293			39,132
Vale of Glamorgan	SGM	WLS	Con	Lab	29,054	53.9%	10,532	80.0%	29,054	18,522	4,945					1,393						53,914
Vale of York	NYK	YTH		Con	23,815	44.7%	9,721	76.0%	14,094	23,815	12,656	2,503									197	53,265
Vauxhall	LND	LND	Lab	Lab	24,920	63.8%	18,660	55.5%	24,920	5,952	6,260									862	1,080	39,074
Wakefield	WYK	YTH	Lab	Lab	28,977	57.4%	14,604	68.9%	28,977	14,373	5,656	1,480										50,486
Wallasey	MSY	NW	Lab	Lab	30,264	64.6%	19,074	73.8%	30,264	11,190	3,899	1,490										46,843
Walsall North	WMD	WM	Lab	Lab	24,517	56.6%	12,588	64.1%	24,517	11,929	4,050	1,430									1,376	43,302
Walsall South	WMD	WM	Lab	Lab	25,024	57.9%	11,312	67.3%	25,024	13,712	2,698	1,662									149	43,245
Walthamstow	LND	LND	Lab	Lab	25,287	63.1%	17,149	62.8%	25,287	8,138	5,491	1,139										40,055
Wansbeck	NBL	NE	Lab	Lab	29,569	65.5%	22,367	71.7%	29,569	6,299	7,202	1,146								956		45,172
Wansdyke	SOM	SW	Lab	Lab	24,117	44.1%	4,799	79.3%	24,117	19,318	9,205	1,327							438		317	54,722
Wantage	OXF	SE	Con	Con	22,311	39.8%	6,089	78.1%	16,222	22,311	14,862	1,549							465	640		56,049
Warley	WMD	WM		Lab	24,813	63.8%	15,451	65.0%	24,813	9,362	3,777	941										38,893
Warrington North	CHS	NW	Lab	Lab	31,827	62.1%	19,527	70.4%	31,827	12,300	5,308	1,816										51,251
Warrington South	CHS	NW	Lab	Lab	28,721	52.1%	10,807	76.0%	28,721	17,914	7,199	1,082									166	55,082
Warwick and Leamington	WAR	WM	Con	Lab	26,747	44.5%	3,398	75.1%	26,747	23,349	7,133	1,484								764	614	60,091
Watford	HRT	E	Con	Lab	25,109	45.3%	5,792	74.6%	25,109	19,227	9,272	1,484									234	55,236
Waveney	SFK	E	Con	Lab	31,486	56.0%	12,093	74.7%	31,486	19,393	5,054										318	56,251
Wealden	SXE	SE	Con	Con	29,417	49.8%	14,204	73.7%	10,185	29,417	15,213	3,527							569		188	59,099
Weaver Vale	CHS	NW		Lab	27,244	56.4%	13,448	73.0%	27,244	13,796	5,949	1,312										48,301
Wellingborough	NTH	EM	Con	Lab	24,854	44.2%	187	74.8%	24,854	24,667	5,279								1,192		297	56,289
Wells	SOM	SW	Con	Con	22,208	39.4%	528	77.8%	10,204	22,208	21,680	2,196									92	56,380
Welwyn Hatfield	HRT	E	Con	Lab	24,936	47.1%	5,595	78.6%	24,936	19,341	7,161										1,530	52,968
Wentworth	SYK	YTH	Lab	Lab	30,225	72.3%	23,959	65.3%	30,225	6,266	3,867	1,423										41,781
West Aberdeenshire and Kincardine	SCT	SCT		LD	17,742	41.1%	2,662	73.1%	3,923	15,080	17,742	808	5,649									43,202
West Bromwich East	WMD	WM	Lab	Lab	23,710	57.2%	13,584	65.4%	23,710	10,126	6,179	1,472										41,487
West Bromwich West	WMD	WM	Lab	Spkr	23,969	65.3%	15,423	54.4%													36,696	36,696
West Chelmsford	ESS	E	Con	Con	22,946	44.9%	9,620	61.9%	13,236	22,946	13,326								1,544			51,052
West Derbyshire	DBY	EM	Con	Con	23,945	42.1%	4,885	78.2%	19,060	23,945	9,940	2,499							484		955	56,883
West Dorset	DOR	SW	Con	Con	22,036	41.1%	1,840	76.1%	9,491	22,036	20,196								1,590		239	53,552
West Ham	LND	LND		Lab	24,531	72.9%	19,494	58.5%	24,531	5,037	2,479										1,614	33,361
West Lancashire	LAN	NW	Lab	Lab	33,022	60.3%	17,119	74.6%	33,022	15,903	3,938	1,025									841	54,729
West Renfrewshire	SCT	SCT		Lab	19,525	46.6%	7,979	76.0%	19,525	7,387	3,045	283	10,546									39,786
West Suffolk	SFK	E		Con	20,081	40.9%	1,867	71.5%	18,214	20,081	6,892	3,724									171	49,082
West Tyrone	NIR	NIR		UUP	16,003	34.6%	1,161	79.2%						16,003	14,842		14,280				1,150	46,275
West Worcestershire	HWR	WM		Con	22,223	45.0%	3,846	76.3%	7,738	22,223	18,377									1,006		49,344
Westbury	WIL	SW	Con	Con	23,037	40.6%	6,068	76.2%	11,969	23,037	16,969	1,909							771		2,096	56,751
Western Isles	SCT	SCT	Lab	Lab	8,955	55.6%	3,576	70.1%	8,955	1,071	495	206	5,379									16,106
Westmorland and Lonsdale	CMA	NW	Con	Con	21,463	42.3%	4,521	74.1%	10,452	21,463	16,942	1,924									2,096	50,781
Weston-super-Mare	AVN	SW	Con	LD	21,407	40.1%	1,274	73.7%	9,557	20,133	21,407	2,280										53,377
Wigan	GTM	NW	Lab	Lab	30,043	68.6%	22,643	67.7%	30,043	7,400	4,390	1,450								442	94	43,819
Wimbledon	LND	LND	Con	Lab	20,674	42.8%	2,990	75.4%	20,674	17,684	8,014	993								474	505	48,344
Winchester	HAM	SE	Con	LD	26,100	42.1%	2	78.6%	6,528	26,098	26,100	1,598							476		1,254	62,054
Windsor	BRK	SE	Con	Con	24,476	48.2%	9,917	73.5%	9,287	24,476	14,559	1,676							302		481	50,781
Wirral South	MSY	NW	Con	Lab	24,499	50.9%	7,004	81.0%	24,499	17,495	5,018	768									315	48,095
Wirral West	MSY	NW	Con	Lab	21,035	44.9%	2,738	77.0%	21,035	18,297	5,945	1,613										46,890
Witney	OXF	SE	Con	Con	24,282	43.0%	7,028	76.7%	17,254	24,282	11,202	2,262							765	636		56,401
Woking	SRY	SE	Con	Con	19,553	38.4%	5,678	72.7%	10,695	19,553	13,875	2,209							512		4,070	50,914
Wokingham	BRK	SE	Con	Con	25,086	50.1%	9,365	75.0%	8,424	25,086	15,721										877	50,108
Wolverhampton North East	WMD	WM	Lab	Lab	24,534	59.2%	12,987	67.1%	24,534	11,547	2,214	1,192									1,916	41,403
Wolverhampton South East	WMD	WM	Lab	Lab	22,202	63.7%	15,182	64.1%	22,202	7,020	3,292	980									1,336	34,830
Wolverhampton South West	WMD	WM	Con	Lab	24,657	50.4%	5,118	72.4%	24,657	19,539	4,012										713	48,921
Woodspring	SOM	SW	Con	Con	24,425	44.4%	7,734	78.5%	11,377	24,425	16,691	1,641								667	167	54,968
Worcester	HWR	WM	Con	Lab	25,848	50.1%	7,452	74.6%	25,848	18,423	6,462								886			51,619
Workington	CMA	NW	Lab	Lab	31,717	64.2%	19,656	75.1%	31,717	12,061	3,967	1,412									267	49,374
Worsley	GTM	NW	Lab	Lab	29,083	62.2%	17,741	67.8%	29,083	11,342	6,356											46,781
Worthing West	WSX	SE		Con	23,733	46.1%	7,713	71.8%	8,347	23,733	16,020	2,313							1,029			51,442
Wrexham	CON	WLS	Lab	Lab	20,450	56.1%	11,762	71.8%	20,450	8,688	4,833	1,195				1,170					86	36,422
Wycombe	BKM	SE	Con	Con	20,890	39.9%	2,370	71.1%	18,520	20,890	9,678	2,394								716	121	52,319
Wyre Forest	HWR	WM	Con	Lab	26,843	48.8%	6,946	75.4%	26,843	19,897	4,377	1,956							312		1,670	55,055
Wythenshawe and Sale East	GTM	NW		Lab	26,448	58.1%	15,019	63.2%	26,448	11,429	5,639	1,060									957	45,533
Yeovil	SOM	SW	LD	LD	26,349	48.7%	11,403	72.3%	8,053	14,946	26,349	3,574								728	403	54,053
Ynys Môn	GWN	WLS	PC	PC	15,756	39.5%	2,481	75.4%	13,275	8,569	1,537	793				15,756						39,930
Total for all constituencies								71.3%	13,518,167	9,591,085	5,242,947	811,849	621,550	258,349	190,814	161,030	126,921	107,348	105,722	61,731	488,771	31,286,284
Total for all constituencies								71.3%	43.2%	30.7%	16.8%	2.6%	2.0%	0.8%	0.6%	0.5%	0.4%	0.3%	0.3%	0.2%	1.6%	100.0%
Total for all constituencies								71.3%	Seats													
Total for all constituencies								71.3%	418	165	46	0	6	10	3	4	2	2	0	0	3	659
Total for all constituencies								71.3%	63.4%	25.0%	7.0%	0.0%	0.9%	1.5%	0.5%	0.6%	0.3%	0.3%	0.0%	0.0%	0.5%	100.0%

== See also ==
- 1997 United Kingdom general election
- Results of the 1997 United Kingdom general election by constituency
- List of MPs elected in the 1997 United Kingdom general election
