= 2017 Odense municipal election =

Municipal election in Denmark

- November 21, 2017

All 29 seats in the Odense Municipal Council 15 seats needed for a majority
- Turnout: 113,917 (70.0%) ▼0.5%
	First party	Second party	Third party
	A	V	C
Party	Social Democrats	Venstre	Conservatives
Last election	9 seats, 28.8%	8 seats, 23.2%	3 seats, 10.6%
Seats won	13	6	3
Seat change	▲4	▼2	0
Popular vote	46,638	21,447	9,630
Percentage	41.8%	19.2%	8.6%
Swing	▲13.0%	▼4.0%	▼2.0%
	Fourth party	Fifth party	Sixth party
	Ø	O	F
Party	Red–Green Alliance	Danish People's Party	Green Left
Last election	3 seats, 10.0%	3 seats, 11.0%	2 seats, 6.1%
Seats won	2	2	1
Seat change	▼1	▼1	▼1
Popular vote	7,308	7,104	5,599
Percentage	6.6%	6.4%	5.0%
Swing	▼3.4%	▼4.7%	▼1.1%
	Seventh party	Eighth party
	B	Å
Party	Social Liberals	The Alternative
Last election	0 seats, 5.1%	New
Seats won	1	1
Seat change	▲1	New
Popular vote	5,215	3,457
Percentage	4.7%	3.1%
Swing	▼0.5%	New
Mayor before election
Peter Rahbæk Juel (acting)
Social Democrats
Elected Mayor
Peter Rahbæk Juel
Social Democrats

The 2017 Odense municipal election was held on 21 November 2017, to elect the 29 members to sit in the regional council for the Odense Municipal Council, in the period of 2018 to 2021. Peter Rahbæk Juel would win the mayoral position after Mayor Anker Boye resigned.

== Background ==
Mayor Anker Boye stepped down on 1 January that year, nominating Peter Rahbæk Juel as his replacement and the mayoral candidate for the Municipal election.

== Result ==
Party		Votes	%	+/-	Seats	+/-
Odense Municipality
A	Social Democrats	46,638	41.84	+13.03	13	+4
V	Venstre	21,447	19.24	-3.99	6	-2
C	Conservatives	9,630	8.64	-1.99	3	0
Ø	Red–Green Alliance	7,308	6.56	-3.46	2	-1
O	Danish People's Party	7,104	6.37	-4.66	2	-1
F	Green Left	5,599	5.02	-1.12	1	-1
B	Social Liberals	5,215	4.68	-0.45	1	+1
Å	The Alternative	3,457	3.10	New	1	New
D	New Right	898	0.80	New	0	New
L	Et Bedre Odense	524	0.47	New	0	New
G	Den Frie Liste	416	0.37	+0.10	0	0
P	Befri Fyn	300	0.27	New	0	New
K	Christian Democrats	264	0.24	-0.01	0	0
E	Nyt Odense	242	0.22	New	0	New
J	Frit Danmark - Folkebev. Mod Indv.	152	0.14	-0.10	0	0
Total		109,194	100	N/A	29	N/A
Invalid votes		585	0.36	+0.07		
Blank votes		1,873	1.15	-0.26		
Turnout		111,652	68.65	+3.33		
Source: valg.dk
