= Boye (surname) =

Boye is a Danish surname. Notable people with the surname include:

- Anker Boye (born 1950), Danish politician
- Erik Boye (born 1964), Danish footballer
- Jan Boye (1962–2011), Danish politician
- John Boye (born 1987), Ghanaian footballer
- Hans Jørgen Boye (born 1942), Danish rower
- Karin Boye (1900–1941), Swedish poet and novelist
- Mario Boyé, Argentine footballer
- Martin Hans Boyè (1812–1907), Danish-American chemist
- Mame Madior Boye (born 1940), Senegalese politician
- Torben Boye (born 1966), Danish footballer
