= Broyles =

Broyles is a surname. Notable people with the surname include:

- Chris Broyles, an American meteorologist at the Storm Prediction Center
- Chuck Broyles (born 1947), American football player and college football head coach
- Dwayne Broyles (born 1982), American basketball player
- Emma Broyles (born 2001), Miss America 2022
- Frank Broyles (1924–2017), American football player and college football head coach
- Paul W. Broyles (1896–1974), American businessman and politician
- Robert Broyles (1933–2011), American actor, drama teacher, theatre director, and writer
- Ryan Broyles (born 1988), American football player
- William Broyles Jr. (born 1944), American screenwriter

== See also ==
- Broyles-Darwin House, a historic house in Dayton, Tennessee, U.S.
- Broyles Award, an American college football award
