= Verner Dalskov =

Danish politician

Verner Dalskov (1 January 1932 – 1 September 2017) was born in the town of Allested-Vejle, Denmark. He was a member of the Socialdemokratiet and was mayor of Odense from 1973 to 1993 at which time he was followed by Anker Boye.

Political offices
Preceded by Holger Larsen	Mayor of Odense; 1 January 1973 – 31 December 1992	Succeeded by Anker Boye
