= Boyde =

Boyde is a surname. Notable people with the surname include:

- Andreas Boyde (born 1967), German pianist
- James Boyde (born 1943), Canadian biathlete
- Thomas Wilson Boyde Jr. (1905–1981), American architect
- William Boyde (born 1953), British actor

== See also ==
- Bode (disambiguation)
- Boyd (disambiguation)
- Boye (disambiguation)
- Boid
- Loyde
