= Boye =

Boye may refer to:

- Boye (surname)
- Boye County, in Hebei, China
- Boye (band), the Serbian and former Yugoslav alternative rock band with new wave influences
- Boye (dog), the poodle dog belonging to Prince Rupert of the Rhine
- Boye Brogeland (born 1973), Norwegian international bridge player

== See also ==
- Boy (disambiguation)
- Boyde
