= Byles =

Byles is an English surname (spelling variations Biles, Boyles, Billes, Bailie, Bill and others) and/or transliteration of the Gaelic O'Boyles. People with that name include:

- Axtell J. Byles (1880–1941), American college football player and coach, lawyer and business executive
- Dan Byles (born 1974), British politician, ocean rower and polar explorer
- Gary Byles, contemporary Australian Army officer
- Janice Byles (born 1944), later Janice Meek, ocean rower and polar explorer
- John Barnard Byles (1801–1884), British barrister
- Junior Byles (1948–2025), Jamaican reggae singer
- Marie Byles (1900–1979), conservationist, solicitor and author
- Mather Byles (1706–1788), British North American clergyman
- Mather Byles (loyalist) (1734/5–1814), Congregational cleric in Connecticut Colony
- Thomas Byles (1870–1912), British Catholic priest, passenger on the RMS Titanic
- Walter Byles (1840–1921), English barrister and cricketer, son of John Barnard Byles
- William Byles (1839–1917), British newspaper owner and Liberal politician
