= Broyles-Darwin House =

Historic house in Tennessee, United States

- Broyles--Darwin House
- U.S. National Register of Historic Places
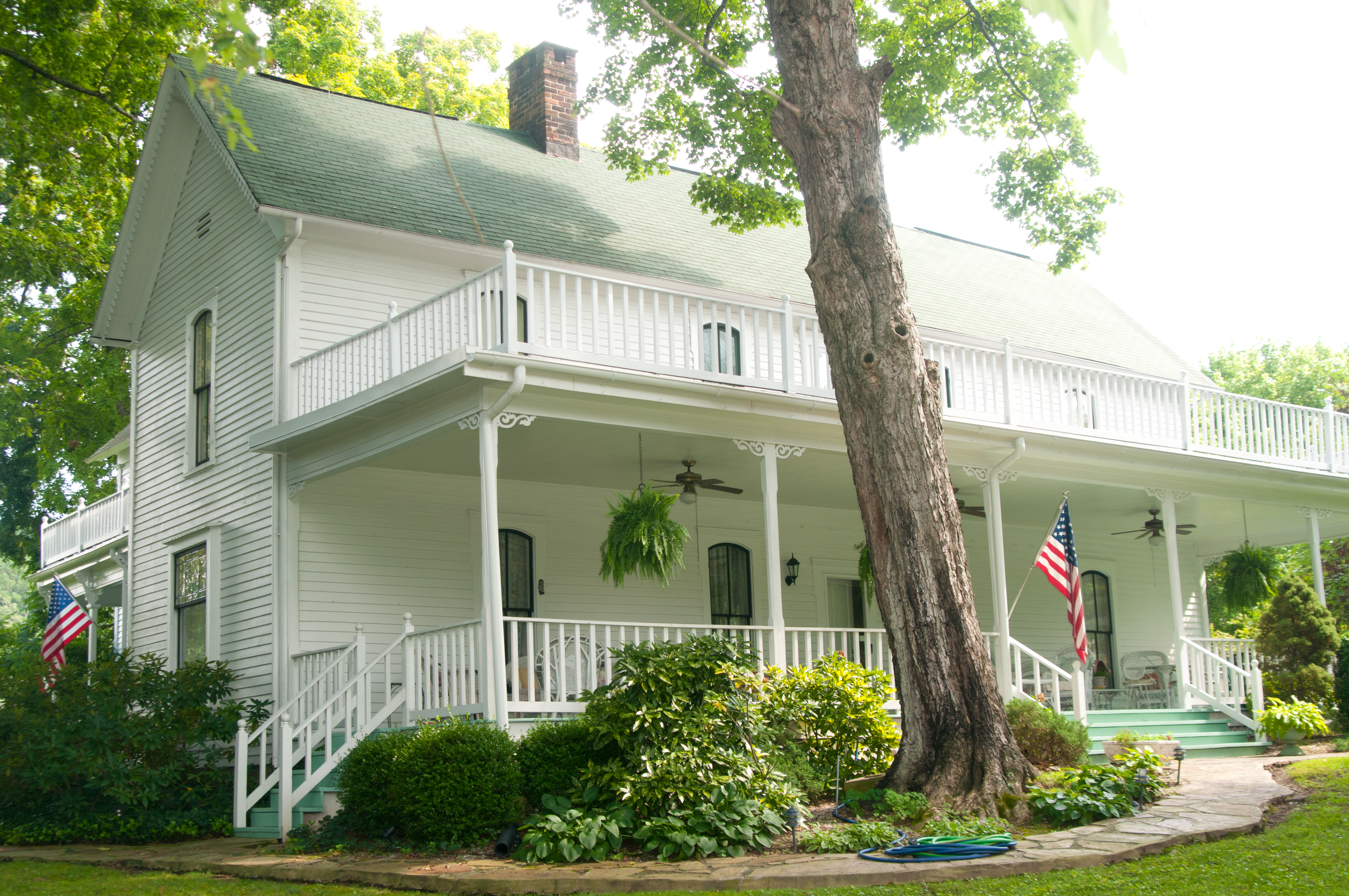

- Location within Tennessee Location within the United States
- Interactive map showing the location of Broyles-Darwin House
- Location: 108 Idaho, Dayton, Tennessee
- Coordinates: 35°29′6″N 85°1′10″W
- Area: less than one acre
- Built: 1860
- Architectural style: Gabled Ell w/ Victorian inf.
- NRHP reference No.: 97000779
- Added to NRHP: July 9, 1997

The Broyles-Darwin House is a historic mansion in Dayton, Tennessee, United States. It was built circa 1860 for Stephen Sanders Decatur Broyles. Broyles served in the Confederate States Army during the American Civil War of 1861–1865. By 1908, the house was purchased by James Robert Darwin. It has been listed on the National Register of Historic Places since July 9, 1997.
