= Rex Boyes =

New Zealand footballer

Personal information
- Full name: Rex V Boyes
- Place of birth: New Zealand
- Position: Forward

Senior career*
Years	Team	Apps	(Gls)
- Seatoun

International career
1948–1951	New Zealand	6	(0)
- * Club domestic league appearances and goals

Rex Boyes is a former association football player who represented New Zealand at international level.

Boyes made his full All Whites debut in a 0–4 loss to Australia on 4 September 1948 and ended his international playing career with six A-international caps to his credit, his final cap an appearance in a 6–4 win over Fiji on 7 October 1951.
