= Edgar William Boyles =

British civil servant

- Born: 24 March 1921; Bedford, Bedfordshire, England
- Died: 7 May 2001 (aged 80); Bedford, Bedfordshire, England
- Occupation: Civil Servant
- Known for: Under-Secretary at the Inland Revenue

Edgar William Boyles (24 March 1921 – 7 May 2001) was a senior British civil servant who became Under-Secretary at the Inland Revenue (1975–81).

== Life ==
Boyles was born in Bedford on 24 March 1921 the son of William John Boyles and Jessie Louisa Boyles. He was educated at Bedford Modern School.

Boyles joined Civil Service in 1938 following open competition. By 1962 Boyles was a Principal Inspector of Taxes and by 1967 a Senior Principal Inspector of Taxes at the Inland Revenue. In 1975 he was appointed Under-Secretary of the Inland Revenue. He retired in 1981.

Boyles married Heather Iris Hobart in 1950. He died aged 80 on 7 May 2001 in Bedford.
