= Barbara Boyes =

American statistician

Barbara Ann Boyes (circa 1932 – 1981) was a US government statistician.

== Early life and education ==
Boyes was originally from Indiana, and majored in mathematics and statistics at the University of Minnesota, beginning her studies there in 1950 with the support of a Minnesota Alumni Scholarship, and graduating in 1957. She also did graduate work at the American University and at Graduate School USA.

== Career and later life ==
Boyes joined the United States Census Bureau in 1957, becoming a mathematical statistician there. In 1972, she moved to the Bureau of Labor Statistics, where she later became an assistant commissioner in charge of the office of survey design, "the highest ranking mathematical statistician in the Bureau".

She died on March 20, 1981, at age 49.

== Recognition ==
In August 1981, Boyes was posthumously named a Fellow of the American Statistical Association, "for technical and administrative contributions to quality improvements in the design and conduct of some of the most important economic surveys in the United States, and for generous and able service to the Association and related professional organizations".
