= Houghton and Washington East =

UK Parliament constituency (1983–2010)

Coordinates: 54°52′N 1°28′W

- Former borough constituency for the House of Commons
- Boundary of Houghton and Washington East in Tyne and Wear for the 2005 general election

- Location of Tyne and Wear within England
- County: Tyne and Wear

1983–2010
- Seats: One
- Created from: Chester-le-Street and Houghton-le-Spring
- Replaced by: Houghton and Sunderland South, Washington and Sunderland West and Sunderland Central

Houghton and Washington East was, from 1997 until 2010, a constituency represented in the House of Commons of the Parliament of the United Kingdom. It elected one Member of Parliament (MP) by the first past the post system of election. A seat with similar boundaries, Houghton and Washington, existed from 1983 until 1997.

== History ==
The constituency of Houghton and Washington was created as a result of the Boundary Commission for England review of parliamentary seats for the 1983 general election following the reorganisation of local government under the Local Government Act 1972 which brought the metropolitan county of Tyne and Wear into existence. It covered the majority of the abolished Houghton-le-Spring seat (those areas now within the metropolitan borough (now City) of Sunderland - including the communities of Houghton-le-Spring, Hetton-le-Hole, Penshaw, Shiney Row, and Herrington), together with the new town of Washington, which had previously been part of the abolished Chester-le-Street seat.

This constituency was abolished by the Boundary Commission for the 1997 general election and replaced by Houghton and Washington East. The wards of Washington East and Washington South were included in the new constituency of Gateshead East and Washington West. Ryhope was transferred in from Sunderland South.

This was, in turn, abolished for the 2010 general election when the Boundary Commission reduced the number of seats in Tyne and Wear from 13 to 12, with the constituencies in the City of Sunderland, in particular, being reorganised. The majority of the seat was now included in the new Houghton and Sunderland South constituency, with "Washington West" being transferred to Washington and Sunderland West. Ryhope was moved back out and included in Sunderland Central.

== Boundaries ==
=== 1983–1997 (Houghton and Washington) ===
- The Metropolitan Borough of Sunderland wards of Eppleton, Hetton, Houghton, Shiney Row, Washington East, Washington North, Washington South, and Washington West.

=== 1997–2010 (Houghton and Washington East) ===
- The City of Sunderland wards of Eppleton, Hetton, Houghton, Ryhope, Shiney Row, Washington East, and Washington North.

== Members of Parliament ==
Election	Member	Party
1983	Constituency created as Houghton and Washington	
1983	Roland Boyes	Labour
1997	Constituency renamed Houghton and Washington East	
1997	Fraser Kemp	Labour
2010	Constituency abolished: see Houghton and Sunderland South and Washington and Sunderland West	

== Elections ==
=== Elections in the 2000s ===
General election 2005: Houghton and Washington East
Party	Candidate	Votes	%	±%
Labour	Fraser Kemp	22,310	64.3	−8.9
Liberal Democrats	Mark Greenfield	6,245	18.0	+5.5
Conservative	Tony Devenish	4,772	13.8	−0.5
BNP	John Richardson	1,367	3.9	New
Majority		16,065	46.3	−12.6
Turnout		34,694	51.7	+2.2
Labour hold		Swing	−7.2	

General election 2001: Houghton and Washington East
Party	Candidate	Votes	%	±%
Labour	Fraser Kemp	24,628	73.2	−3.2
Conservative	Tony Devenish	4,810	14.3	+1.4
Liberal Democrats	Richard Ormerod	4,203	12.5	+4.8
Majority		19,818	58.9	−4.6
Turnout		33,641	49.5	−12.6
Labour hold		Swing	−2.3	

=== Elections in the 1990s ===
General election 1997: Houghton and Washington East
Party	Candidate	Votes	%	±%
Labour	Fraser Kemp	31,946	76.38	
Conservative	Philip Booth	5,391	12.89	
Liberal Democrats	Keith Miller	3,209	7.67	
Referendum	James Joseph	1,277	3.05	New
Majority		26,555	63.49	
Turnout		41,823	62.10	
Labour hold		Swing		

General election 1992: Houghton and Washington
Party	Candidate	Votes	%	±%
Labour	Roland Boyes	34,733	62.02	
Conservative	Andrew Tyrie	13,925	24.86	
Liberal Democrats	Owen Dumpleton	7,346	13.12	
Majority		20,808	37.16	
Turnout		56,004	70.60	
Labour hold		Swing		

=== Elections in the 1980s ===
General election 1987: Houghton and Washington
Party	Candidate	Votes	%	±%
Labour	Roland Boyes	32,805	59.1	+7.4
Conservative	Martin Callanan	12,612	22.7	−1.2
SDP	Rod Kenyon	10,090	18.2	−6.2
Majority		20,193	36.37	+9.06
Turnout		55,507	71.25	
Labour hold		Swing		

General election 1983: Houghton and Washington
Party	Candidate	Votes	%	±%
Labour	Roland Boyes	26,168	51.70	
SDP	Rod Kenyon	12,347	24.39	
Conservative	Richard Fletcher-Vane	12,104	23.91	
Majority		13,821	27.31	
Turnout		50,619	66.88	
Labour win (new seat)				

== See also ==
- History of parliamentary constituencies and boundaries in Tyne and Wear
