= Roland Boyes =

British politician

Roland Boyes MP
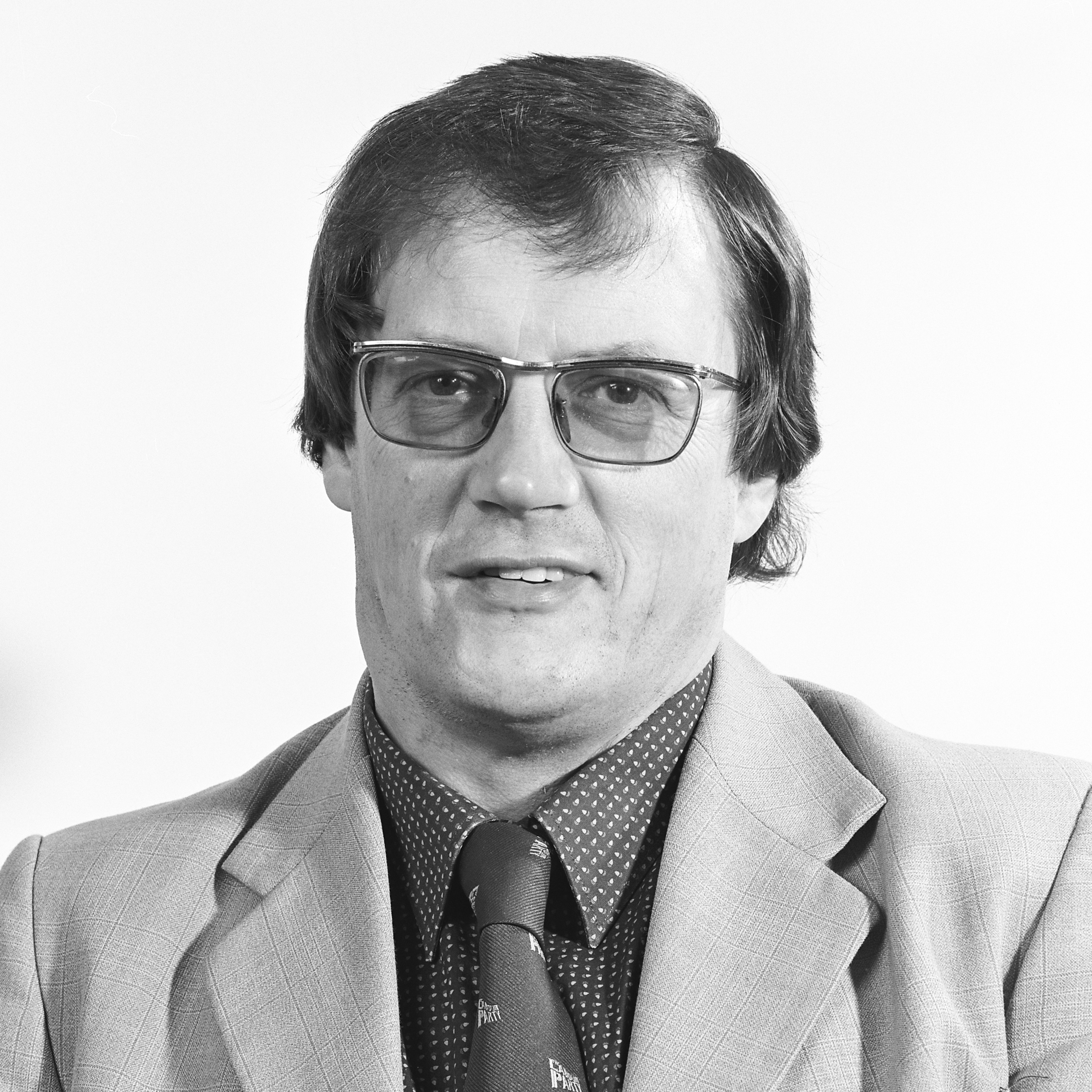

Member of Parliament for Houghton and Washington
- In office 9 June 1983 – 8 April 1997
- Preceded by: Constituency created
- Succeeded by: Fraser Kemp

Personal details
- Born: 12 February 1937 Holmfirth, Yorkshire
- Died: 16 June 2006 (aged 69) Peterlee, County Durham
- Party: Labour
- Known for: Member of the board of directors at Hartlepool United; Set up the Alzheimer's Research Trust

Roland Boyes MP (12 February 1937 – 16 June 2006) was a British Labour Party politician, amateur photographer and, in retirement, a fundraiser for research into Alzheimer's disease.

== Early years ==
Boyes was born in Holmfirth, Yorkshire, the son of a lorry driver, and educated at Wooldale Infant and Junior School. A bout of spinal meningitis caused him to miss the 11-plus and he attended a year at a secondary modern school before moving to Penistone Grammar School. He attended the University of Leicester to study chemistry, but left after one year.

== Teaching and marriage ==
He then attended Coventry Teachers Training College, where he met his future wife, and taught mathematics in secondary schools for 13 years. Meanwhile, he took a part-time Master's degree in Economics at the University of Bradford, and married Patricia James (with whom he had two sons) in 1962. He was assistant director of social services at Durham County Council from 1975 to 1979.

== Political life ==
Boyes began his political career by joining the Labour Party at age 20. He served as a local councillor on Easington District Council from 1973 and then Peterlee Town Council. He was elected as MEP for Durham from 1979 to 1984. In the 1983 general election, he was sponsored by the General, Municipal and Boilermakers' Union, and succeeded Houghton-le-Spring MP Tom Urwin as Member of Parliament for the new Houghton and Washington constituency. An outspoken left-winger, he was a member of CND and supported the protestors against cruise missiles at Greenham Common.

In Parliament, he joined the Tribune group and the Campaign group, and was noted for loud interjections in a broad Yorkshire accent from his seat. Nevertheless, he soon became a frontbench spokesman under Neil Kinnock, on environment from 1985 to 1988 and on defence from 1988 to 1992. He lost his front-bench position when John Smith became leader of the Labour Party, but then served on Select committees, on Environment from 1992 to 1994 and on National Heritage from 1994 to 1997. A keen photographer, he produced a book in 1990, People in Parliament, containing black-and-white photographs of MPs. He was also a member of the board of directors at Hartlepool United.

== Alzheimer's Research Trust ==
Following a rapid deterioration in his mental abilities from 1993, Boyes was diagnosed with Alzheimer's disease in 1995 (in which year he turned only 58), and subsequently retired at the 1997 general election, reportedly never knowing that Labour won the election. He set up the Alzheimer's Research Trust to raise funding for research into Alzheimer's. The Trust raised much of the funding for a suite at Newcastle General Hospital that opened in 2001 and was named in his honour. He died in 2006 in Peterlee, County Durham, aged 69.

Parliament of the United Kingdom
New constituency before: see Houghton-le-Spring	Member of Parliament for Houghton and Washington; 1983–1997	Constituency abolished (see Houghton and Washington East)
