= Fraser Kemp =

British politician

Assistant Whip
- In office 12 June 2001 – 11 May 2005
- Prime Minister: Tony Blair

Member of Parliament for Houghton and Washington East
- In office 2 May 1997 – 12 April 2010
- Preceded by: Roland Boyes
- Succeeded by: Constituency Abolished

Personal details
- Born: 1 September 1958 (age 67) Washington, County Durham
- Party: Labour

Fraser Kemp (born 1 September 1958) is a British Labour Party politician who was the member of parliament (MP) for Houghton and Washington East from 1997 to 2010, and previously a full-time employee of the Labour Party.

== Early life ==
He attended Biddick Primary School and Washington School in Washington, Tyne and Wear.

Kemp started work in the civil service in 1975 and was active in the Civil and Public Services Association and the Clause Four faction in the Labour Party. He began working full-time for the Labour Party in 1981.

Appointed as party organiser in Leicester, by 1984 he was an Assistant Regional Organiser in the East Midlands, before being appointed Regional Organiser in the West Midlands in 1986.

He came to prominence as the election agent responsible for two of the biggest swings to the Labour Party in history, at the Mid Staffordshire by-election in 1990, largely fought on the question of the Poll Tax, and an even bigger swing at the Dudley West by-election in 1994, not long after Tony Blair became leader of the Labour Party.

Kemp was then posted to party headquarters in Millbank Tower, London, and became General Election Co-ordinator in 1994. He held this post until being selected as Labour candidate for Houghton and Washington East, the constituency where he grew up, in 1996.

In 2001, Kemp unsuccessfully auditioned to be presenter of quiz show The Chair.

== Parliamentary career ==
In 2001, Kemp was appointed to the Government Whip's Office as a junior whip but was recalled to by-election service in 2004, masterminding, along with his protégé Tom Watson, Labour's victories over the Liberal Democrats in the Birmingham Hodge Hill and Hartlepool by-elections.

Kemp retired at the 2010 general election, when his constituency disappeared in boundary changes.

== Personal life ==
Kemp married Patricia Mary Byrne in 1989. They have two sons and a daughter.
