= Jan Boye =

Danish politician

Mayor of Odense
- In office 1 January 2006 – 31 December 2009
- Preceded by: Anker Boye
- Succeeded by: Anker Boye

County Mayor of Funen
- In office 2001–2005
- Preceded by: Karen Nøhr
- Succeeded by: Poul Weber

Personal details
- Born: 19 January 1962
- Died: 22 October 2011 (aged 49)
- Political party: Conservative People's Party

Jan Boye (19 January 1962 – 22 October 2011) was a Danish politician, representing the Conservative Party. From 1 January 2006 to 31 December 2009, he was mayor of Odense, Denmark's third largest city. He served as County Mayor of Funen County from 2001 to 2005. He also served as the chairman of Dansk Håndbold Forbund from June 2011 to his death.

In the Danish municipal elections on 15 November 2005, Boye was the Conservative candidate as new mayor of Odense, Funen's capital and Denmark's third largest city; challenging the ruling Social Democratic mayor, Anker Boye (no relation). The election was a great success for the Conservatives with the party gaining eleven seats in the City Council compared to five in the 2001 election.

The election resulted in a tie with both wings holding 14 of the 29 seats. Ultimately, Erik Simonsen, representing the Social Liberal Party, decided to turn down an offer from the Social Democrats offering to support Simonsen as new mayor, and offered his support to Boye. He was the first non-Social Democratic mayor of Odense since 1937. In the 2009-municipality election, Jan Boye lost the election to former mayor Anker Boye. The Conservatives lost 4 seats, while the Socialdemocrats reclaimed their position as the biggest party in the municipality with their 10 seats.

Boye was a medical doctor by profession. He was also known as an international handball referee, and served in that capacity in the 2000 Olympic Games in Sydney, and in the 2004 Olympic Games in Athens.

In June 2011 he was elected new chairman of the Danish Handball Federation, Dansk Håndbold Forbund.

On 7 October 2011 Boye suffered a brain hemorrhage. He died from the complications on 22 October 2011.
