= Anker Boye =

Danish politician

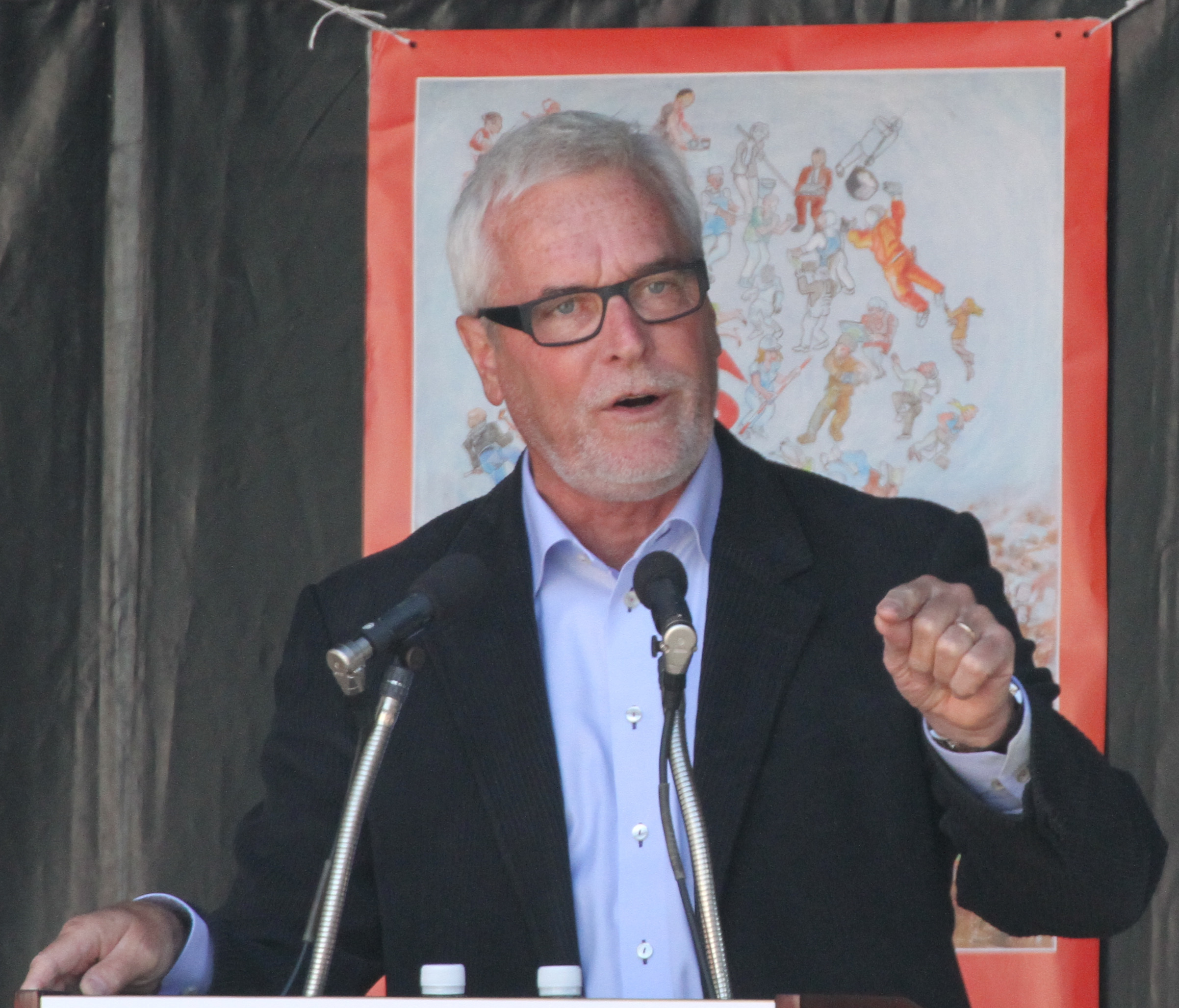

Mayor of Odense
- In office 1 January 2010 – 31 December 2016
- Preceded by: Jan Boye
- Succeeded by: Peter Rahbæk Juel
- In office 1 January 1994 – 31 December 2005
- Preceded by: Verner Dalskov
- Succeeded by: Jan Boye

Personal details
- Born: 12 February 1950 (age 76)
- Party: Social Democrats

Anker Boye (born 12 February 1950) is a Danish politician representing the Social Democratic Party. He is a painter by profession.

Anker Boye was elected as mayor of Odense, Denmark's third-largest city, in 1993 and served in that capacity until 2005. In 2001, he got a historic number of votes and carried almost all fourteen members of the Social Democratic group into the City Council. He was defeated in the 2005 municipal elections by the Conservative challenger, Jan Boye, county mayor of Funen (no relation). The elections were a massive defeat for the Social Democrats, losing four of their fourteen seats in Odense City Council.

The election on 15 November 2005 resulted in a tie with both wings carrying 14 of the 29 seats, the last being carried by Erik Simonsen from the Social Liberal Party. Anker Boye admitted defeat and tried to persuade Simonsen to become the new mayor with Social Democratic backing – in a live broadcast. Simonsen refused the offer and gave his support to Jan Boye from the Conservatives.

Anker Boye's administration has been criticized in several respects, including his membership of a total of 47 committees taking time from his duties as mayor. Boye has also been criticized for the low number of jobs created in Odense, compared to Copenhagen and Århus, and for a number of slips in the celebration of the 200th anniversary of the birth of Hans Christian Andersen; most importantly, the huge deficit created by a charity concert starring Tina Turner.

In the municipality-election 17 November 2009 Anker Boye reclaimed his former post as mayor of Odense, by winning the municipality election. The coalition made of Red-Green Alliance, Green Left and the Social Democrats won 17 out of 29 seats in the city council, thereby winning the majority.

Anker Boye resigned as mayor by the end of 2016 and announced that he would not seek re-election. By the end of 2017 he retired from politics.
