= First Opposition frontbench of Harriet Harman =

The frontbench of Her Majesty's Loyal Opposition in the Parliament of the United Kingdom consists of the Shadow Cabinet and other shadow ministers of the political party currently serving as the Official Opposition. In 2010 Her Majesty's Loyal Opposition was the Labour Party, and the Leader of the Opposition was Harriet Harman.

Key

Sits in the House of Commons
Sits in the House of Lords
Privy Counsellor
Shadow Cabinet full members **in bold**
Shadow Cabinet attendees **in bold italics**

== Leader's Office, Cabinet Office and Whips Office ==
Office of the Leader of the Opposition
Acting Leader of the Opposition	**Harriet Harman**
Acting Shadow Deputy Prime Minister	**Jack Straw**
Cabinet Office
Shadow Minister for the Cabinet Office, Olympics and London	**Tessa Jowell**
Shadow Minister	Paul Goggins
Shadow Minister	Baroness Royall of Blaisdon
Parliament
Shadow Leader of the House of Commons and Shadow Minister for Women	**Rosie Winterton**
Shadow Deputy Leader of the House	Barbara Keeley
Shadow Leader of the House of Lords	Baroness Royall of Blaisdon
Shadow Deputy Leader of the House of Lords	Lord Hunt of Kings Heath

== Foreign Affairs and Defence ==
Foreign and Commonwealth Office
Shadow Foreign Secretary	**David Miliband**
Shadow Minister	Ivan Lewis
Shadow Minister for Europe	Chris Bryant
Shadow Minister for Africa and the UN	Baroness Kinnock of Holyhead
Shadow Minister	Baroness Symons of Vernham Dean
Shadow Minister	Baroness Crawley
Ministry of Defence
Shadow Secretary of State for Defence	**Bob Ainsworth**
Shadow Minister for Veterans	Kevan Jones
Shadow Minister	Lord Tunnicliffe
Department for International Development
Shadow Secretary of State for International Development	**Douglas Alexander**
Shadow Minister	Gareth Thomas
Shadow Minister	Lord Brett

== Treasury ==
HM Treasury
Shadow Chancellor of the Exchequer	**Alistair Darling**
Shadow Chief Secretary	Liam Byrne
Shadow Financial Secretary	Stephen Timms
Shadow Minister	David Hanson
Shadow Minister	Gareth Thomas
Shadow Minister	Angela Eagle
Shadow Minister	Lord Eatwell
Shadow Minister	Lord Davies of Abersoch

== Home Affairs ==
Home Office
Shadow Home Secretary	**Alan Johnson**
Shadow Minister for Borders and Immigration	Phil Woolas
Shadow Minister for Identity	Meg Hillier
Shadow Minister for Crime Reduction	Alan Campbell
Shadow Minister	Lord Brett
Ministry of Justice and Attorney General's Office
Shadow Lord Chancellor and Shadow Secretary of State for Justice	**Jack Straw**
Shadow Minister and Shadow Solicitor General	Maria Eagle
Shadow Minister	Helen Jones
Shadow Minister	Lord Bach
Shadow Attorney General	**Baroness Scotland of Asthal**
Shadow Advocate-General for Scotland	Lord Davidson of Glen Clova

== Business ==
Department for Business, Innovation and Skills
Shadow Secretary of State for Business, Innovation and Skills	**Pat McFadden**
Shadow Minister for Higher Education and Intellectual Property	David Lammy
Shadow Minister for Further Education, Skills, Apprenticeships and Consumer Affairs	Kevin Brennan
Shadow Minister for Business and Regulatory Reform	Ian Lucas
Shadow Minister for Digital Britain	Stephen Timms
Shadow Minister for Postal Affairs and Employment Relations	Lord Young of Acton

== Work and Pensions ==
Department for Work and Pensions
Shadow Secretary of State for Work and Pensions	**Yvette Cooper**
Shadow Minister	Helen Goodman
Shadow Minister	Kerry McCarthy
Shadow Minister	Lord McKenzie of Luton
Shadow Minister	Baroness Thornton
Shadow Minister	Baroness Royall of Blaisdon

== Energy and Climate Change ==
Department of Energy and Climate Change
Shadow Secretary of State for Energy and Climate Change	**Ed Miliband**
Shadow Minister	Joan Ruddock
Shadow Minister	Emily Thornberry
Shadow Minister	Lord Hunt of Kings Heath

== Health ==
Department of Health
Shadow Secretary of State for Health	**Andy Burnham**
Shadow Minister	Barbara Keeley
Shadow Minister	Diana Johnson
Shadow Minister	Mary Creagh
Shadow Minister	Baroness Thornton
Shadow Minister	Baroness Crawley
Shadow Minister	Baroness Jones of Whitchurch

== Education ==
Department for Education
Shadow Secretary of State for Education	**Ed Balls**
Shadow Minister for Schools and Learners	Vernon Coaker
Shadow Minister for 14-19 Reform and Apprenticeships	Iain Wright
Shadow Minister for Children, Young People and Families	Baroness Morgan of Drefelin
Shadow Minister	Baroness Royall of Blaisdon

== Communities and Local Government ==
Department for Communities and Local Government
Shadow Secretary of State for Communities and Local Government	**John Denham**
Shadow Minister for Housing and Planning	John Healey
Shadow Minister	Ian Austin
Shadow Minister	Gordon Marsden
Shadow Minister	Lord McKenzie of Luton
Shadow Minister	Baroness Crawley
Shadow Minister	Lord Patel of Bradford

== Transport ==
Department for Transport
Shadow Secretary of State for Transport	**Sadiq Khan**
Shadow Minister	Willie Bain
Shadow Minister	Lord Davies of Stamford

== DEFRA ==
Department for Environment, Food and Rural Affairs
Shadow Secretary of State for Environment, Food and Rural Affairs	**Hilary Benn**
Shadow Minister for Food, Farming and Environment	Jim Fitzpatrick
Shadow Minister for Marine and Natural Environment	Huw Irranca-Davies
Shadow Minister	Baroness Quin

== Culture, Olympics, Media & Sport ==
Department for Culture
Shadow Secretary of State for Culture, Olympics, Media and Sport	**Ben Bradshaw**
Shadow Minister	Baroness Royall of Blaisdon
Shadow Minister for Culture and Tourism	Margaret Hodge
Shadow Minister for Sport	Gerry Sutcliffe
Shadow Minister for Sport	Baroness Billingham
Shadow Minister	Lord Evans of Watford
Shadow Minister	Baroness Morgan of Drefelin

== Wales, Scotland and Northern Ireland ==
Office of the Secretary of State for Wales
Shadow Secretary of State for Wales	**Peter Hain**
Shadow Minister	Wayne David
Shadow Minister	Lord Davies of Stamford
Office of the Secretary of State for Scotland
Shadow Secretary of State for Scotland	**Jim Murphy**
Shadow Minister	Ann McKechin
Shadow Minister	Lord Sewel
Northern Ireland Office
Shadow Secretary of State for Northern Ireland	**Shaun Woodward**
Shadow Minister	Paul Goggins
Shadow Minister	Baroness Royall of Blaisdon
