= List of shadow holders of the Great Offices of State =

This is a list shadow holders of the Great Offices of State in the United Kingdom's Official Opposition Shadow Cabinet since Hugh Gaitskell's Shadow Cabinet of 1955. The purpose of the Shadow Cabinet is to scrutinise the opposing ministers, develop alternate policies, and hold the government to account for its actions in a form of checks and balances. The Opposition Shadow Cabinet is made up of about 20 ministers from the largest opposition party.

== List ==
Government	Opposition Party	Leader of the Opposition	Shadow Chancellor	Shadow Foreign Secretary	Shadow Home Secretary
Conservative (Eden)	Labour (Gaitskell)	Hugh Gaitskell; 14 December 1955 – 18 January 1963†	Harold Wilson; 14 December 1955 – 2 November 1961	Alfred Robens; 14 December 1955 – 22 July 1956	Kenneth Younger; 14 December 1955 – 13 May 1957
Conservative (Eden)	Labour (Gaitskell)	Hugh Gaitskell; 14 December 1955 – 18 January 1963†	Harold Wilson; 14 December 1955 – 2 November 1961	Aneurin Bevan; 22 July 1956 – 11 October 1959	Kenneth Younger; 14 December 1955 – 13 May 1957
Conservative (Macmillan)	Labour (Gaitskell)	Hugh Gaitskell; 14 December 1955 – 18 January 1963†	Harold Wilson; 14 December 1955 – 2 November 1961	Aneurin Bevan; 22 July 1956 – 11 October 1959	Patrick Gordon Walker; 13 May 1957 – 12 March 1962
Conservative (Macmillan)	Labour (Gaitskell)	Hugh Gaitskell; 14 December 1955 – 18 January 1963†	Harold Wilson; 14 December 1955 – 2 November 1961	Denis Healey; 11 October 1959 – 2 November 1961	Patrick Gordon Walker; 13 May 1957 – 12 March 1962
Conservative (Macmillan)	Labour (Gaitskell)	Hugh Gaitskell; 14 December 1955 – 18 January 1963†	James Callaghan; 2 November 1961 – 15 October 1964	Harold Wilson; 2 November 1961 – 14 February 1963	Patrick Gordon Walker; 13 May 1957 – 12 March 1962
Conservative (Macmillan)	Labour (Gaitskell)	Hugh Gaitskell; 14 December 1955 – 18 January 1963†	James Callaghan; 2 November 1961 – 15 October 1964	Harold Wilson; 2 November 1961 – 14 February 1963	George Brown; 12 March 1962 – 15 February 1963
Conservative (Douglas- Home)	Labour (Wilson I)	Harold Wilson; 14 February 1963 – 16 October 1964	James Callaghan; 2 November 1961 – 15 October 1964	Patrick Gordon Walker; 14 February 1963 – 15 October 1964	Frank Soskice; 15 February 1963 – 15 October 1964
Labour (Wilson I–II)	Conservative (Douglas-Home)	Alec Douglas-Home; 16 October 1964 – 28 July 1965	Reginald Maudling; 15 October 1964 – 16 February 1965	R. A. Butler; 15 October 1964 – 16 February 1965	Edward Boyle; 15 October 1964 – 1965
Labour (Wilson I–II)	Conservative (Douglas-Home)	Alec Douglas-Home; 16 October 1964 – 28 July 1965	Edward Heath; 16 February 1965 – 11 November 1965	Reginald Maudling; 16 February 1965 – 11 November 1965	Peter Thorneycroft; 1965 – 13 April 1966
Labour (Wilson I–II)	Conservative (Heath I)	Edward Heath; 28 July 1965 – 18 June 1970	Iain Macleod; 11 November 1965 – 20 June 1970	Christopher Soames; 11 November 1965 – 13 April 1966	Peter Thorneycroft; 1965 – 13 April 1966
Labour (Wilson I–II)	Conservative (Heath I)	Edward Heath; 28 July 1965 – 18 June 1970	Iain Macleod; 11 November 1965 – 20 June 1970	Alec Douglas-Home; 13 April 1966 – 18 June 1970	Quintin Hogg; 13 April 1966 – 18 June 1970
Conservative (Heath)	Labour (Wilson II)	Harold Wilson; 19 June 1970 – 4 March 1974	Roy Jenkins; 20 June 1970 – 19 April 1972	Denis Healey; 20 June 1970 – 19 April 1972	James Callaghan; 18 June 1970 – 19 October 1971
Conservative (Heath)	Labour (Wilson II)	Harold Wilson; 19 June 1970 – 4 March 1974	Roy Jenkins; 20 June 1970 – 19 April 1972	Denis Healey; 20 June 1970 – 19 April 1972	Shirley Williams; 19 October 1971 – 4 May 1973
Conservative (Heath)	Labour (Wilson II)	Harold Wilson; 19 June 1970 – 4 March 1974	Denis Healey; 19 April 1972 – 28 February 1974	James Callaghan; 19 April 1972 – 28 February 1974	Shirley Williams; 19 October 1971 – 4 May 1973
Conservative (Heath)	Labour (Wilson II)	Harold Wilson; 19 June 1970 – 4 March 1974	Denis Healey; 19 April 1972 – 28 February 1974	James Callaghan; 19 April 1972 – 28 February 1974	Roy Jenkins; 4 May 1973 – 4 March 1974
Labour (Wilson III–IV)	Conservative (Heath II)	Edward Heath; 4 March 1974 – 11 February 1975	Robert Carr; 28 February 1974 – 11 February 1975	Geoffrey Rippon; 28 February 1974 – 11 February 1975	Keith Joseph; 4 March 1974 – 11 February 1975
Labour (Wilson III–IV)	Conservative (Thatcher)	Margaret Thatcher; 11 February 1975 – 4 May 1979	Geoffrey Howe; 11 February 1975 – 4 May 1979	Reginald Maudling; 11 February 1975 – 11 April 1976	Ian Gilmour; 11 February 1975 – 11 April 1976
Labour (Callaghan)	Conservative (Thatcher)	Margaret Thatcher; 11 February 1975 – 4 May 1979	Geoffrey Howe; 11 February 1975 – 4 May 1979	John Davies; 11 April 1976 – 23 September 1978	William Whitelaw; 11 April 1976 – 4 May 1979
Labour (Callaghan)	Conservative (Thatcher)	Margaret Thatcher; 11 February 1975 – 4 May 1979	Geoffrey Howe; 11 February 1975 – 4 May 1979	Francis Pym; 23 September 1978 – 4 May 1979	William Whitelaw; 11 April 1976 – 4 May 1979
Conservative (Thatcher)	Labour (Callaghan)	James Callaghan; 4 May 1979 – 10 November 1980	Denis Healey; 4 May 1979 – 4 November 1980	Peter Shore; 4 May 1979 – 4 November 1980	Merlyn Rees; 4 May 1979 – 4 November 1980
Conservative (Thatcher)	Labour (Foot)	Michael Foot; 10 November 1980 – 2 October 1983	Peter Shore; 4 November 1980 – 9 June 1983	Denis Healey; 4 November 1980 – 13 June 1987	Roy Hattersley; 4 November 1980 – 2 October 1983
Conservative (Thatcher)	Labour (Kinnock)	Neil Kinnock; 2 October 1983 – 18 July 1992	Roy Hattersley; 9 June 1983 – 11 June 1987	Denis Healey; 4 November 1980 – 13 June 1987	Gerald Kaufman; 2 October 1983 – 13 June 1987
Conservative (Thatcher)	Labour (Kinnock)	Neil Kinnock; 2 October 1983 – 18 July 1992	John Smith; 11 June 1987 – 18 July 1992	Gerald Kaufman; 11 June 1987 – 19 July 1992	Roy Hattersley; 13 June 1987 – 19 July 1992
Conservative (Major)	Labour (Kinnock)	Neil Kinnock; 2 October 1983 – 18 July 1992	John Smith; 11 June 1987 – 18 July 1992	Gerald Kaufman; 11 June 1987 – 19 July 1992	Roy Hattersley; 13 June 1987 – 19 July 1992
Conservative (Major)	Labour (Smith)	John Smith; 18 July 1992 – 12 May 1994†	Gordon Brown; 18 July 1992 – 2 May 1997	Jack Cunningham; 11 April 1992 – 22 July 1994	Tony Blair; 19 July 1992 – 22 July 1994
Conservative (Major)	Labour (Beckett)	Margaret Beckett‡ 12 May 1994 – 21 July 1994	Gordon Brown; 18 July 1992 – 2 May 1997	Jack Cunningham; 11 April 1992 – 22 July 1994	Tony Blair; 19 July 1992 – 22 July 1994
Conservative (Major)	Labour (Blair)	Tony Blair; 21 July 1994 – 2 May 1997	Gordon Brown; 18 July 1992 – 2 May 1997	Robin Cook; 22 July 1994 – 2 May 1997	Jack Straw; 22 July 1994 – 2 May 1997
Labour (Blair)	Conservative (Major)	John Major; 7 May 1997 – 11 June 1997	Kenneth Clarke; 2 May 1997 – 11 June 1997	John Major; 7 May 1997 – 11 June 1997	Michael Howard; 2 May 1997 – 11 June 1997
Labour (Blair)	Conservative (Hague)	William Hague; 19 June 1997 – 18 December 2001	Peter Lilley; 11 June 1997 – 2 June 1998	Michael Howard; 11 June 1997 – 15 June 1999	Brian Mawhinney; 11 June 1997 – 2 June 1998
Labour (Blair)	Conservative (Hague)	William Hague; 19 June 1997 – 18 December 2001	Francis Maude; 2 June 1998 – 1 February 2000	Michael Howard; 11 June 1997 – 15 June 1999	Norman Fowler; 2 June 1998 – 15 June 1999
Labour (Blair)	Conservative (Hague)	William Hague; 19 June 1997 – 18 December 2001	Francis Maude; 2 June 1998 – 1 February 2000	John Maples; 15 June 1999 – 2 February 2000	Ann Widdecombe; 15 June 1999 – 18 September 2001
Labour (Blair)	Conservative (Hague)	William Hague; 19 June 1997 – 18 December 2001	Michael Portillo; 1 February 2000 – 18 September 2001	Francis Maude; 2 February 2000 – 18 September 2001	Ann Widdecombe; 15 June 1999 – 18 September 2001
Labour (Blair)	Conservative (Duncan Smith)	Iain Duncan Smith; 18 September 2001 – 6 November 2003	Michael Howard; 18 September 2001 – 6 November 2003	Michael Ancram; 18 September 2001 – 10 May 2005	Oliver Letwin; 18 September 2001 – 6 November 2003
Labour (Blair)	Conservative (Howard)	Michael Howard; 6 November 2003 – 6 December 2005	Oliver Letwin; 6 November 2003 – 5 May 2005	Michael Ancram; 18 September 2001 – 10 May 2005	David Davis; 6 November 2003 – 12 June 2008
Labour (Blair)	Conservative (Howard)	Michael Howard; 6 November 2003 – 6 December 2005	George Osborne; 5 May 2005 – 6 May 2010	Liam Fox; 10 May 2005 – 6 December 2005	David Davis; 6 November 2003 – 12 June 2008
Labour (Blair)	Conservative (Cameron)	David Cameron; 6 December 2005 – 6 May 2010	George Osborne; 5 May 2005 – 6 May 2010	William Hague; 6 December 2005 – 6 May 2010	David Davis; 6 November 2003 – 12 June 2008
Labour (Brown)	Conservative (Cameron)	David Cameron; 6 December 2005 – 6 May 2010	George Osborne; 5 May 2005 – 6 May 2010	William Hague; 6 December 2005 – 6 May 2010	Dominic Grieve; 12 June 2008 – 19 January 2009
Labour (Brown)	Conservative (Cameron)	David Cameron; 6 December 2005 – 6 May 2010	George Osborne; 5 May 2005 – 6 May 2010	William Hague; 6 December 2005 – 6 May 2010	Chris Grayling; 19 January 2009 – 6 May 2010
Conservative– Liberal; Democrat (Cameron–Clegg)	Labour (Harman I)	Harriet Harman‡ 11 May 2010 – 25 September 2010	Alistair Darling; 11 May 2010 – 8 October 2010	David Miliband; 11 May 2010 – 8 October 2010	Alan Johnson; 11 May 2010 – 8 October 2010
Conservative– Liberal; Democrat (Cameron–Clegg)	Labour (Miliband)	Ed Miliband; 25 September 2010 – 8 May 2015	Alan Johnson; 8 October 2010 – 20 January 2011	Yvette Cooper; 8 October 2010 – 20 January 2011	Ed Balls; 8 October 2010 – 20 January 2011
Conservative– Liberal; Democrat (Cameron–Clegg)	Labour (Miliband)	Ed Miliband; 25 September 2010 – 8 May 2015	Ed Balls; 20 January 2011 – 11 May 2015	Douglas Alexander; 20 January 2011 – 11 May 2015	Yvette Cooper; 20 January 2011 – 12 September 2015
Conservative (Cameron II)	Labour (Harman II)	Harriet Harman‡ 8 May 2015 – 12 September 2015	Chris Leslie; 11 May 2015 – 12 September 2015	Hilary Benn; 11 May 2015 – 26 June 2016	Yvette Cooper; 20 January 2011 – 12 September 2015
Conservative (Cameron II)	Labour (Corbyn)	Jeremy Corbyn; 12 September 2015 – 4 April 2020	John McDonnell; 13 September 2015 – 5 April 2020	Hilary Benn; 11 May 2015 – 26 June 2016	Andy Burnham; 13 September 2015 – 28 September 2016
Conservative (May)	Labour (Corbyn)	Jeremy Corbyn; 12 September 2015 – 4 April 2020	John McDonnell; 13 September 2015 – 5 April 2020	Emily Thornberry; 27 June 2016 – 5 April 2020	Diane Abbott; 6 October 2016 – 5 April 2020
Conservative (Johnson)	Labour (Corbyn)	Jeremy Corbyn; 12 September 2015 – 4 April 2020	John McDonnell; 13 September 2015 – 5 April 2020	Emily Thornberry; 27 June 2016 – 5 April 2020	Diane Abbott; 6 October 2016 – 5 April 2020
Conservative (Johnson)	Labour (Starmer)	Keir Starmer; 4 April 2020 – 5 July 2024	Anneliese Dodds; 5 April 2020 – 9 May 2021	Lisa Nandy; 5 April 2020 – 29 November 2021	Nick Thomas-Symonds; 5 April 2020 – 29 November 2021
Conservative (Johnson)	Labour (Starmer)	Keir Starmer; 4 April 2020 – 5 July 2024	Rachel Reeves; 9 May 2021 – 5 July 2024	Lisa Nandy; 5 April 2020 – 29 November 2021	Nick Thomas-Symonds; 5 April 2020 – 29 November 2021
Conservative (Johnson)	Labour (Starmer)	Keir Starmer; 4 April 2020 – 5 July 2024	Rachel Reeves; 9 May 2021 – 5 July 2024	David Lammy; 29 November 2021 – 5 July 2024	Yvette Cooper; 29 November 2021 – 5 July 2024
Conservative (Truss)	Labour (Starmer)	Keir Starmer; 4 April 2020 – 5 July 2024	Rachel Reeves; 9 May 2021 – 5 July 2024	David Lammy; 29 November 2021 – 5 July 2024	Yvette Cooper; 29 November 2021 – 5 July 2024
Conservative (Sunak)	Labour (Starmer)	Keir Starmer; 4 April 2020 – 5 July 2024	Rachel Reeves; 9 May 2021 – 5 July 2024	David Lammy; 29 November 2021 – 5 July 2024	Yvette Cooper; 29 November 2021 – 5 July 2024
Labour (Starmer)	Conservative (Sunak)	Rishi Sunak; 5 July 2024 – 2 November 2024	Jeremy Hunt; 8 July 2024 – 4 November 2024	Andrew Mitchell; 8 July 2024 – 4 November 2024	James Cleverly; 8 July 2024 – 5 November 2024
Labour (Starmer)	Conservative (Badenoch)	Kemi Badenoch; 2 November 2024 – present	Mel Stride; 4 November 2024 – 31 August 2026	Dame Priti Patel; 4 November 2024 – 31 August 2026	Chris Philp; 5 November 2024 – present
Labour (Burnham)	Conservative (Badenoch)	Kemi Badenoch; 2 November 2024 – present	Mel Stride; 4 November 2024 – 31 August 2026	Dame Priti Patel; 4 November 2024 – 31 August 2026	Chris Philp; 5 November 2024 – present
Labour (Burnham)	Conservative (Badenoch)	Kemi Badenoch; 2 November 2024 – present	Andrew Griffith; 31 August 2026 – present	Tom Tugendhat; 31 August 2026 – present	Chris Philp; 5 November 2024 – present

†Died in office
‡Served as interim leader

== See also ==
- His Majesty's Most Loyal Opposition
- Official Opposition Shadow Cabinet (United Kingdom)
- Official Opposition frontbench
- List of British shadow cabinets
