= Shadow Minister of Agriculture, Fisheries and Food =

Shadow Minister for Agriculture, Fisheries and Food
- Appointer: Leader of the Opposition
- Final holder: Tim Yeo
- Abolished: 18 September 2001
- Succession: Shadow Secretary of State for Environment, Food and Rural Affairs

The Shadow Minister of Agriculture, Fisheries and Food was a member of the UK Shadow Cabinet responsible for the scrutiny of the Ministers of Agriculture, Fisheries and Food and his/her ministry, the Ministry of Agriculture, Fisheries and Food.

== Shadow Secretaries of State ==
Name	Entered office	Left office	Political party	Shadow Cabinet
George Brown	15 July 1955	15 February 1956	Labour	Attlee
Tom Williams	15 February 1956	November 1959	Labour	Gaitskell
Fred Willey	November 1959	November 1960	Labour	Gaitskell
Geoffrey de Freitas	November 1960	November 1961	Labour	Gaitskell
Fred Peart	December 1961	16 October 1964	Labour	Gaitskell
Fred Peart	December 1961	16 October 1964	Labour	Wilson
Christopher Soames	16 October 1964	16 February 1965	Conservative	Douglas-Home
Martin Redmayne	16 February 1965	4 August 1965	Conservative	Douglas-Home
Joseph Godber	4 August 1965	19 June 1970	Conservative	Heath
Cledwyn Hughes	19 June 1970	16 December 1971	Labour	Wilson II
Fred Peart	16 December 1971	7 December 1972	Labour	Wilson II
Norman Buchan	7 December 1972	4 March 1974	Labour	Wilson II
The Rt Hon. Francis Pym	11 March 1974	April 1975	Conservative	Heath II
Michael Jopling	April 1975	15 January 1976	Conservative	Thatcher
The Rt Hon. Francis Pym	15 January 1976	19 November 1976	Conservative	Thatcher
John Peyton	19 November 1976	4 May 1979	Conservative	Thatcher
Roy Mason	14 July 1979	24 November 1981	Labour	Callaghan
Roy Mason	14 July 1979	24 November 1981	Labour	Foot
Norman Buchan	24 November 1981	1 October 1983	Labour	Foot
Robert Hughes	31 October 1983	26 October 1984	Labour	Kinnock
Brynmor John	26 October 1984	13 July 1987	Labour	Kinnock
David Clark	13 July 1987	24 July 1992	Labour	Kinnock
Ron Davies	24 July 1992	21 October 1993	Labour	Smith
Gavin Strang	21 October 1993	2 May 1997	Labour	Smith
Gavin Strang	21 October 1993	2 May 1997	Labour	Beckett
Gavin Strang	21 October 1993	2 May 1997	Labour	Blair
Douglas Hogg	2 May 1997	17 June 1997	Conservative	Major
David Curry	17 June 1997	3 November 1997	Conservative	Hague
Michael Jack	2 December 1997	12 June 1998	Conservative	Hague
Tim Yeo	2 June 1998	18 September 2001	Conservative	Hague

From 2001 the Shadow Minister of Agriculture, Fisheries and Food was dissolved and responsibility formerly transferred to the Shadow Secretary of State for Environment, Food and Rural Affairs.

== See also ==
- Minister of Agriculture, Fisheries and Food
- UK Shadow Cabinet
