= Shadow Secretary of State for Environment, Food and Rural Affairs =

UK political post

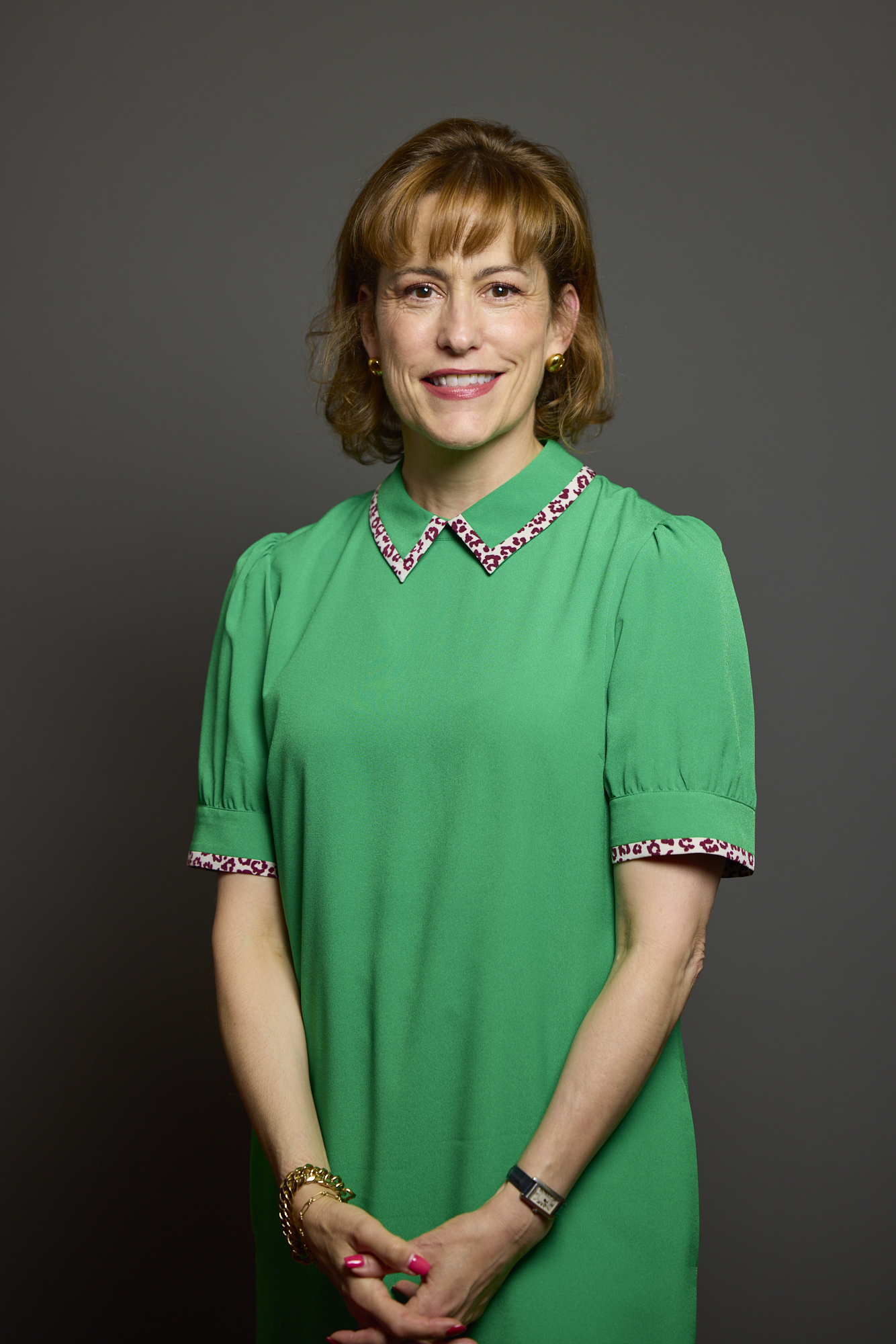
- Incumbent; Victoria Atkins since 5 November 2024
- Appointer: Leader of the Opposition
- Website: The Shadow Cabinet

Shadow Secretary of State for Environment, Food and Rural Affairs is a position with the UK Opposition's Shadow Cabinet that deals with issues surrounding the environment and food and rural affairs; if the opposition party is elected to government, the designated person is a likely choice to become the new secretary of state for environment, food and rural affairs.

The position existed as Shadow Secretary of State for the Environment until 1997, when it was renamed Environment, Transport and the Regions to match the Government's reorganisation. It changed to its current name in 2001 for the same reason. Under Michael Howard, the arrangement was slightly different. There was a shadow environment secretary outside the Shadow Cabinet and (together with the shadow transport secretary) under the direction of the shadow secretary of state for environment and transport.

== Shadow secretaries of state ==
=== Shadow Minister of Public Buildings and Works ===
Name	Took office	Left office	Political party	Shadow Cabinet
Tony Greenwood	15 July 1955	16 November 1959	Labour	Attlee
Tony Greenwood	15 July 1955	16 November 1959	Labour	Gaitskell
Barbara Castle	16 November 1959	28 November 1960	Labour	Gaitskell
Unknown	28 November 1960	30 November 1961	Labour	Gaitskell
Dick Mitchison	30 November 1961	22 February 1963	Labour	Gaitskell
Dick Mitchison	30 November 1961	22 February 1963	Labour	Brown
Charles Pannell	22 February 1963	16 October 1964	Labour	Wilson
Geoffrey Rippon	16 October 1964	29 October 1964	Conservative	Douglas-Home
James Ramsden	29 October 1964	6 October 1965	Conservative	Douglas-Home
Robin Chichester-Clark	6 October 1965	19 June 1970	Ulster Unionist	Heath
John Silkin	19 June 1970	22 July 1970	Labour	Wilson II
Anthony Crosland	22 July 1970	15 October 1970	Labour	Wilson II
=== Shadow Secretary of State for the Environment ===
Name	Took office	Left office	Political party	Shadow Cabinet
Anthony Crosland	15 October 1970	5 March 1974	Labour	Wilson II
Geoffrey Rippon	5 March 1974	11 March 1974	Conservative	Heath II
Margaret Thatcher	11 March 1974	7 November 1974	Conservative	Heath II
Paul Channon	7 November 1974	18 February 1975	Conservative	Heath II
Timothy Raison	18 February 1975	19 November 1976	Conservative	Thatcher
Michael Heseltine	19 November 1976	4 May 1979	Conservative	Thatcher
Peter Shore	4 May 1979	14 July 1979	Labour	Callaghan
Roy Hattersley	14 July 1979	8 December 1980	Labour	Callaghan
Gerald Kaufman	8 December 1980	31 October 1983	Labour	Foot
Jack Cunningham	31 October 1983	2 November 1989	Labour	Kinnock
Bryan Gould	2 November 1989	18 July 1992	Labour	Kinnock
Chris Smith	18 July 1992	20 October 1994	Labour	Smith
Chris Smith	18 July 1992	20 October 1994	Labour	Beckett
Frank Dobson	20 October 1994	2 May 1997	Labour	Blair
John Gummer	2 May 1997	11 June 1997	Conservative	Major
=== Shadow Secretary of State for Environment, Transport and the Regions ===
Name	Took office	Left office	Political party	Shadow Cabinet
Norman Fowler	11 June 1997	1 June 1998	Conservative	Hague
Gillian Shepherd	1 June 1998	14 June 1999	Conservative	Hague
John Redwood	14 June 1999	2 February 2000	Conservative	Hague
Archie Norman	2 February 2000	18 September 2001	Conservative	Hague
=== Shadow Secretary of State for Environment, Food and Rural Affairs ===
Name	Took office	Left office	Political party	Shadow Cabinet
Peter Ainsworth	18 September 2001	23 July 2002	Conservative	Duncan Smith
David Lidington	23 July 2002	10 November 2003	Conservative	Duncan Smith
Caroline Spelman	10 November 2003	15 March 2004	Conservative	Howard
Richard Ottaway	15 March 2004	10 May 2005	Conservative	Howard
=== Shadow Secretary of State for Environment, Food and Rural Affairs ===
Name	Took office	Left office	Political party	Shadow Cabinet
Oliver Letwin	10 May 2005	6 December 2005	Conservative	Howard
Peter Ainsworth	6 December 2005	19 January 2009	Conservative	Cameron
Nick Herbert	19 January 2009	11 May 2010	Conservative	Cameron
Hilary Benn	11 May 2010	8 October 2010	Labour	Harman
Mary Creagh	8 October 2010	7 October 2013	Labour	Miliband
Maria Eagle	7 October 2013	14 September 2015	Labour	Miliband
Maria Eagle	7 October 2013	14 September 2015	Labour	Harman II
Kerry McCarthy	14 September 2015	26 June 2016	Labour	Corbyn
Rachael Maskell	27 June 2016	1 February 2017	Labour	Corbyn
Sue Hayman	9 February 2017	12 December 2019	Labour	Corbyn
Luke Pollard (Note: On leave: 30 August 2021 – 5 October 2021 Acting Shadow Secretary: Daniel Zeichner)	7 January 2020	29 November 2021	Labour	Corbyn
Luke Pollard	7 January 2020	29 November 2021	Labour	Starmer
Jim McMahon	29 November 2021	4 September 2023	Labour	Starmer
Steve Reed	4 September 2023	5 July 2024	Labour	Starmer
Steve Barclay	8 July 2024	5 November 2024	Conservative	Sunak
Victoria Atkins	5 November 2024	Incumbent	Conservative	Badenoch
