= Access talks =

Change of UK government discussions

In British politics, access talks, also known as pre-election contact, is a process whereby senior members of the Opposition and senior civil servants meet in the run up to a general election to assist the Opposition and Civil Service to prepare for a change of government. Access talks are separate from briefings provided to the Leader of the Opposition and senior members of the Shadow Cabinet which take place between elections.

Harold Wilson gave the first public statement on access talks in 1970, but access talks had been taking place before this. Access talks are governed by the 'Douglas-Home rules', which require the talks to be 'discreet','on a factual basis' and that the Prime Minister must 'know nothing whatsoever'.

== Content ==
During access talks the Civil Service explains the existing machinery of government and the Opposition explains their priorities and proposed changes to government departments and the parties confirm the Opposition ministers living and office arrangements. The Civil Service does not advise the Opposition on its policies. However, senior civil servants sometimes ask questions in a way to provide advice, such as asking whether a particular department has weighed in on the matter, or if the opposition has considered a previous time the policy was tried.

== Timing ==
Access talks begin when authorised by the Prime Minister. Before 1992, access talks took place six months before the end of the Parliament, although no talks took place before the election period in 1983 and 1987, due to the short duration of these Parliaments Following the 1992 election, the then Leader of the Opposition and Prime Minister agreed to lengthen the period of talks. Between 1992 and 2010 elections, access talks began at least 15 months before the end of the Parliament. In 2015, the talks began 7 months before the end of the Parliament, but this was in the context of the Fixed-term Parliaments Act, which fixed the date of the election. In 2017 and 2019, access talks began at or slightly before the calling of snap elections. In 2024, access talks were authorised approximately 12 months before the scheduled end of the Parliament.
