= Shadow Secretary of State for Scotland =

Shadow Cabinet office

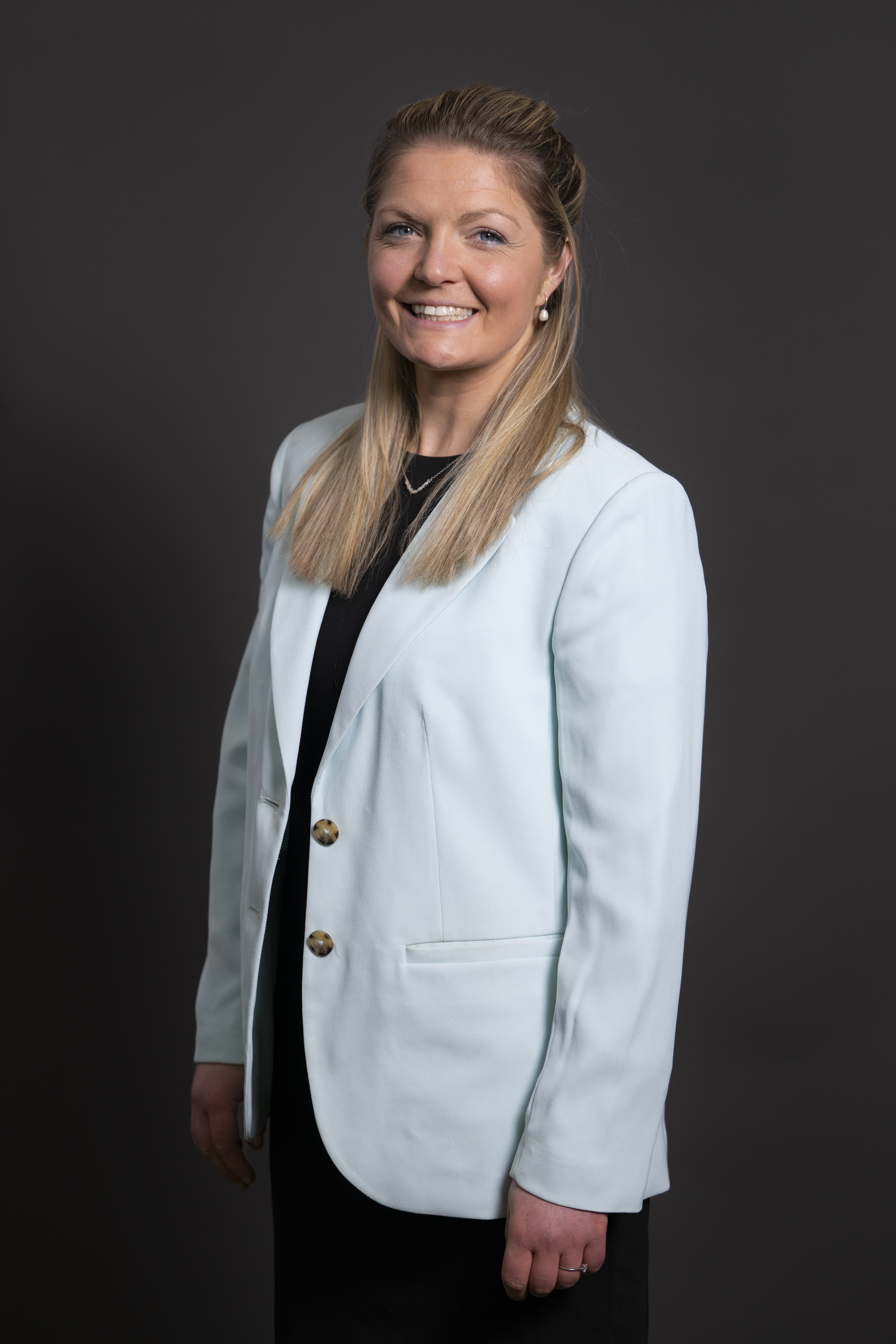
- Incumbent; Harriet Cross since 31 August 2026
- Appointer: Leader of the Opposition
- Inaugural holder: Tom Fraser
- Formation: 26 October 1951

The shadow secretary of state for Scotland is a member of the UK Shadow Cabinet responsible for the scrutiny of the secretary of state for Scotland and his/her department, the Scotland Office. The incumbent holder of the office is Harriet Cross.

== Shadow secretaries of state ==
Name	Entered office	Left office	Political party	Shadow Cabinet
Tom Fraser	26 October 1951	7 December 1961	Labour	Attlee
Tom Fraser	26 October 1951	7 December 1961	Labour	Gaitskell
Tom Fraser	26 October 1951	7 December 1961	Labour	Wilson
Willie Ross	7 December 1961	16 October 1964	Labour	Wilson
Michael Noble	16 October 1964	23 January 1969	Conservative	Douglas-Home
Michael Noble	16 October 1964	23 January 1969	Conservative	Heath
Gordon Campbell	23 January 1969	19 June 1970	Conservative	Heath
Willie Ross	19 June 1970	4 March 1974	Labour	Wilson II
Henry Hepburne-Scott	4 March 1974	12 March 1974	Conservative	Heath II
Alick Buchanan-Smith	12 March 1974	9 December 1976	Conservative	Heath II
Alick Buchanan-Smith	12 March 1974	9 December 1976	Conservative	Thatcher
Teddy Taylor	9 December 1976	3 May 1979	Conservative	Thatcher
Bruce Millan	4 May 1979	31 October 1983	Labour	Callaghan
Bruce Millan	4 May 1979	31 October 1983	Labour	Foot
Donald Dewar	31 October 1983	18 July 1992	Labour	Kinnock
Tom Clarke	18 July 1992	21 October 1993	Labour	Smith
George Robertson	21 October 1993	2 May 1997	Labour	Smith
George Robertson	21 October 1993	2 May 1997	Labour	Beckett
George Robertson	21 October 1993	2 May 1997	Labour	Blair
Office not in use (Note: Michael Howard and William Hague served as Shadow Minister with special interest in constitutional matters)	2 May 1997	19 June 1997	Conservative	Major
Michael Ancram; MP for Devizes; As Constitutional Affairs spokesperson	19 June 1997	1 June 1998	Conservative	Hague
Liam Fox; MP for Woodspring; As Constitutional Affairs spokesperson	1 June 1998	15 June 1999	Conservative	Hague
Sir George Young; MP for North West Hampshire; As Constitutional Affairs spokesperson	15 June 1999	26 September 2000	Conservative	Hague
Angela Browning; MP for Tiverton and Honiton; As Constitutional Affairs spokesperson	26 September 2000	18 September 2001	Conservative	Hague
Jacqui Lait	14 September 2001	11 November 2003	Conservative	Duncan Smith
Peter Duncan	11 November 2003	6 May 2005	Conservative	Howard
James Gray	9 May 2005	12 May 2005	Conservative	Howard
Eleanor Laing	19 May 2005	7 December 2005	Conservative	Howard
David Mundell	7 December 2005	11 May 2010	Conservative	Cameron
Jim Murphy	11 May 2010	8 October 2010	Labour	Harman
Ann McKechin	8 October 2010	7 October 2011	Labour	Miliband
Margaret Curran	7 October 2011	11 May 2015	Labour	Miliband
Ian Murray	11 May 2015	26 June 2016	Labour	Harman II
Ian Murray	11 May 2015	26 June 2016	Labour	Corbyn
Dave Anderson	1 July 2016	14 June 2017	Labour	Corbyn
Lesley Laird	14 June 2017	13 December 2019	Labour	Corbyn
Tony Lloyd	19 December 2019	6 April 2020	Labour	Corbyn
Ian Murray	6 April 2020	5 July 2024	Labour	Starmer
John Lamont	8 July 2024	5 November 2024	Conservative	Sunak
Andrew Bowie	5 November 2024	31 August 2026	Conservative	Badenoch
Harriet Cross	31 August 2026	Incumbent	Conservative	Badenoch

== See also ==
- Secretary of State for Scotland
- Scottish Office
- UK Shadow Cabinet
