= Sunak shadow cabinet =

UK shadow cabinet in 2024

Sunak Shadow Cabinet
- July – November 2024
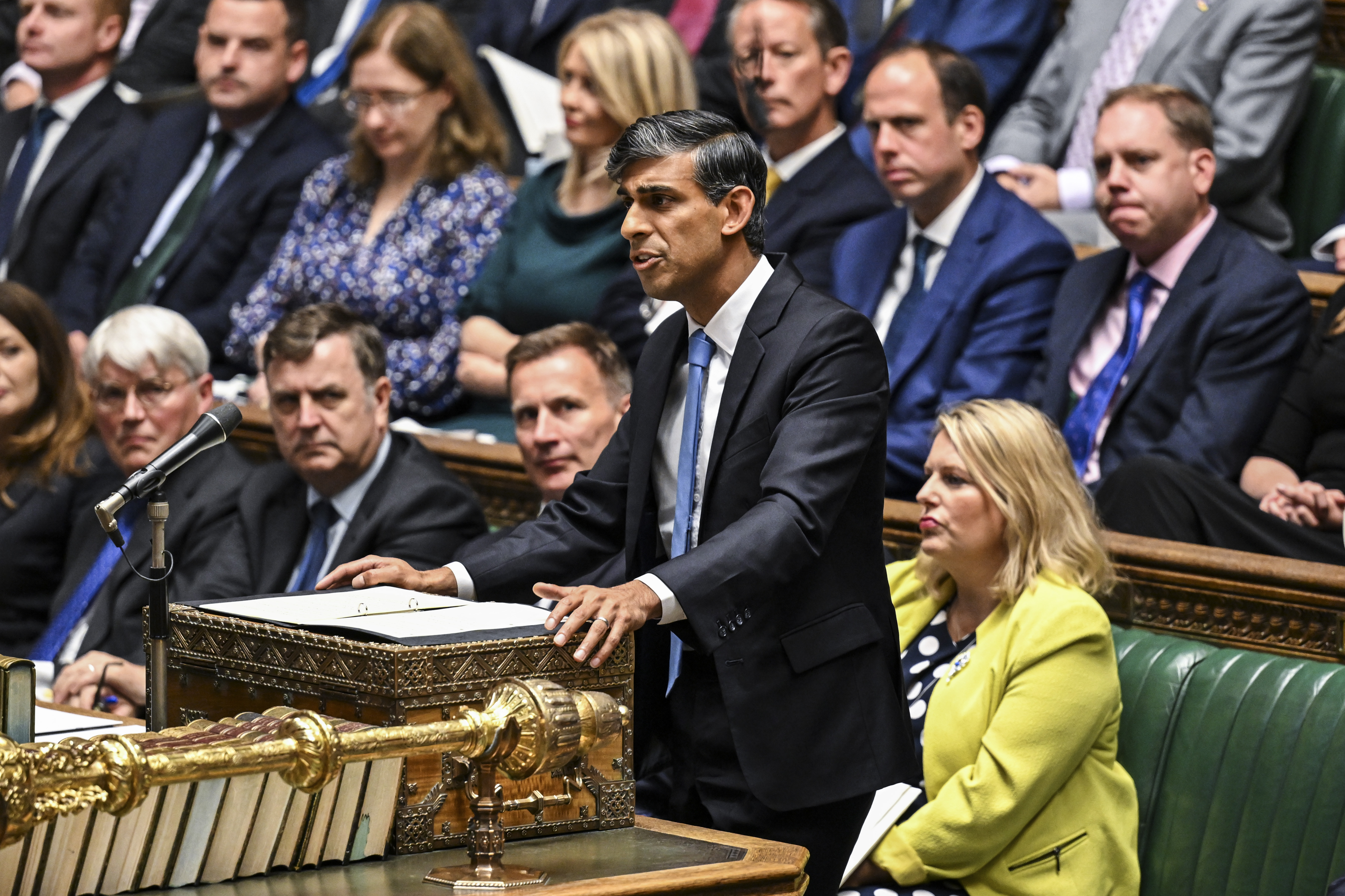
- Sunak with members of his shadow cabinet during a session of Prime Minister's Questions in July 2024
- Date formed: 8 July 2024
- Date dissolved: 2 November 2024

People and organisations
- Monarch: Charles III
- Leader of the Opposition: Rishi Sunak
- Shadow Deputy Prime Minister: Oliver Dowden
- Member party: Conservative
- Status in legislature: Official Opposition

History
- Incoming formation: 2024 general election
- Outgoing formation: 2024 Conservative leadership election
- Legislature terms: 2024 Parliament
- Predecessor: Starmer shadow cabinet
- Successor: Badenoch shadow cabinet

Rishi Sunak was Leader of the Opposition as Leader of the Conservative Party from 5 July to 2 November 2024, following his resignation as British prime minister in the aftermath of the Conservative Party's defeat in the 2024 general election. He formed his shadow cabinet on 8 July 2024. Sunak served as Leader of the Opposition until his successor was elected in the 2024 Conservative leadership election.

== Overview ==
In his resignation speech, Rishi Sunak announced that he would resign as the Conservative leader once the arrangements were in place for his successor to be elected in the 2024 Conservative leadership election. He formed his shadow cabinet on 8 July 2024. This was the party's first shadow cabinet since the Cameron shadow cabinet, which was disbanded in 2010 after Cameron formed a coalition government with Nick Clegg's Liberal Democrats following that year's general election.

Most members of Sunak's cabinet heading into the 2024 general election were given the same portfolios in the shadow cabinet, including former chancellor Jeremy Hunt, who became shadow chancellor, and former Home Secretary James Cleverly, who became Shadow Home Secretary. Cameron, who previously served as Foreign Secretary, chose to retire from frontline politics, with his former deputy Andrew Mitchell becoming Shadow Foreign Secretary instead. Richard Holden resigned as party chairman, and was succeeded by Richard Fuller in an interim capacity outside shadow cabinet.

Sunak appointed new officeholders to the portfolios held by the eleven cabinet ministers who lost their seats in the election, including Edward Argar, who became shadow justice secretary after the outgoing justice secretary Alex Chalk lost his seat, as well as Helen Whately, who became shadow transport secretary after the outgoing transport secretary Mark Harper also lost his seat. Among other noteworthy appointments, Kemi Badenoch became the shadow housing, communities and local government secretary and former deputy prime minister Oliver Dowden became deputy leader of the opposition.

Sunak served as Leader of the Opposition until his successor, Kemi Badenoch, was elected in the 2024 Conservative leadership election; the result was announced on 2 November.

== Shadow cabinet appointments ==
Key
Sits in the House of Commons
Sits in the House of Lords

Official Opposition Shadow Cabinet of the United Kingdom
Portfolio	Shadow Minister	Constituency	Term
Shadow cabinet ministers
Leader of the Opposition; Leader of the Conservative Party	Rishi Sunak; MP	Richmond and Northallerton	July 2024 – November 2024
Shadow Deputy Prime Minister; Shadow Chancellor of the Duchy of Lancaster	Sir Oliver Dowden; MP	Hertsmere	July 2024 – November 2024
Shadow Chancellor of the Exchequer	Jeremy Hunt; MP	Godalming and Ash	July 2024 – November 2024
Shadow Secretary of State for Foreign, Commonwealth and Development Affairs	Andrew Mitchell; MP	Sutton Coldfield	July 2024 – November 2024
Shadow Home Secretary	James Cleverly; MP	Braintree	July 2024 – November 2024
Shadow Secretary of State for Defence	James Cartlidge; MP	South Suffolk	July 2024 – November 2024
Shadow Lord Chancellor Shadow Secretary of State for Justice	Ed Argar; MP	Melton and Syston	July 2024 – November 2024
Shadow Secretary of State for Science, Innovation and Technology	Andrew Griffith; MP	Arundel and South Downs	July 2024 – November 2024
Shadow Secretary of State for Health and Social Care	Victoria Atkins; MP	Louth and Horncastle	July 2024 – November 2024
Shadow Secretary of State for Levelling Up, Housing and Communities	Kemi Badenoch; MP	North West Essex	July 2024 – November 2024
Shadow Secretary of State for Environment, Food and Rural Affairs	Steve Barclay; MP	North East Cambridgeshire	July 2024 – November 2024
Shadow Leader of the House of Commons	Chris Philp; MP	Croydon South	July 2024 – November 2024
Shadow Leader of the House of Lords	The Lord True	Member of the House of Lords	July 2024 – November 2024
Shadow Secretary of State for Business and Trade	Kevin Hollinrake; MP	Thirsk and Malton	July 2024 – November 2024
Shadow Secretary of State for Energy Security and Net Zero	Claire Coutinho; MP	East Surrey	July 2024 – November 2024
Shadow Secretary of State for Work and Pensions	Mel Stride; MP	Central Devon	July 2024 – November 2024
Shadow Secretary of State for Education	Damian Hinds; MP	East Hampshire	July 2024 – November 2024
Shadow Secretary of State for Transport	Helen Whately; MP	Faversham and Mid Kent	July 2024 – November 2024
Shadow Secretary of State for Culture, Media and Sport	Julia Lopez; MP	Hornchurch and Upminster	July 2024 – November 2024
Shadow Secretary of State for Northern Ireland	Alex Burghart; MP	Brentwood and Ongar	July 2024 – November 2024
Shadow Secretary of State for Scotland	John Lamont; MP	Berwickshire, Roxburgh and Selkirk	July 2024 – November 2024
Shadow Secretary of State for Wales	The Lord Davies of Gower	Member of the House of Lords	July 2024 – November 2024
Also attending shadow cabinet meetings
Opposition Chief Whip of the House of Commons	Stuart Andrew; MP	Daventry	July 2024 – November 2024
Shadow Chief Secretary to the Treasury	Laura Trott; MP	Sevenoaks	July 2024 – November 2024
Shadow Attorney General	Jeremy Wright; KC MP	Kenilworth and Southam	July 2024 – November 2024
Shadow Paymaster General	John Glen; MP	Salisbury	July 2024 – November 2024
Shadow Minister for Security	Tom Tugendhat; MP	Tonbridge	July 2024 – November 2024
Shadow Minister for Veterans	Andrew Bowie; MP	West Aberdeenshire and Kincardine	July 2024 – November 2024
Shadow Minister for Women and Equalities	Mims Davies; MP	East Grinstead and Uckfield	July 2024 – November 2024

=== Junior roles ===
On 18 July, further junior frontbench roles were appointed.

=== Changes ===
Changes from Sunak's final Cabinet to Shadow Cabinet.

- David Cameron, Baron Cameron of Chipping Norton (Foreign Secretary) resigned and was succeeded by Andrew Mitchell.
- Mitchell was Deputy Foreign Secretary for question time in the Commons and attended Cabinet as Minister of State for Development and Africa. Harriett Baldwin was later announced as Shadow Development Minister, but did not attend Shadow Cabinet.
- Grant Shapps (Defence Secretary) lost his seat and was succeeded by James Cartlidge.
- Alex Chalk (Secretary of State for Justice and Lord Chancellor) lost his seat and was succeeded by Ed Argar.
- Michelle Donelan (Secretary of State for Science, Innovation and Technology) lost her seat and was succeeded by Andrew Griffith.
- Michael Gove (Secretary of State for Levelling Up, Housing and Communities and Minister for Intergovernmental Relations) retired from the commons and was succeeded in the former role by Kemi Badenoch; the latter role did not have a successor named.
- Badenoch (Business Secretary and Minister for Women and Equalities) was succeeded by Kevin Hollinrake in the former role and Mims Davies in the latter role.
- Penny Mordaunt (Leader of the House of Commons and Lord President of the Council) lost her seat and was succeeded by Chris Philp.
- Gillian Keegan (Education Secretary) lost her seat and was succeeded by Damian Hinds.
- Mark Harper (Transport Secretary) lost his seat and was succeeded by Helen Whately.
- Lucy Frazer (Culture Secretary) lost her seat and was succeeded by Julia Lopez.
- Richard Holden (Minister without Portfolio and party chair) resigned and was succeeded by Richard Fuller in an interim capacity outside Shadow Cabinet.
- Chris Heaton-Harris (Northern Ireland Secretary) stood down and was succeeded by Alex Burghart.
- Alister Jack (Scotland Secretary) retired from the commons and was succeeded by John Lamont.
- David T. C. Davies (Wales Secretary) lost his seat and was succeeded by The Lord Davies of Gower. No Conservative MPs were elected in Wales.
- Simon Hart (Chief Whip of the House of Commons and Parliamentary Secretary to the Treasury), who attended Cabinet, lost his seat and was succeeded by Stuart Andrew.
- Victoria Prentis (Attorney General), who attended Cabinet, lost her seat and was succeeded by Jeremy Wright.
- Johnny Mercer (Minister of State for Veterans' Affairs), who attended Cabinet, lost his seat and was succeeded by Andrew Bowie.
- Michael Tomlinson (Minister of State for Countering Illegal Migration), who attended Cabinet, lost his seat and was not succeeded by anybody.
