= Shadow Secretary of State for Transport =

Political post in the United Kingdom

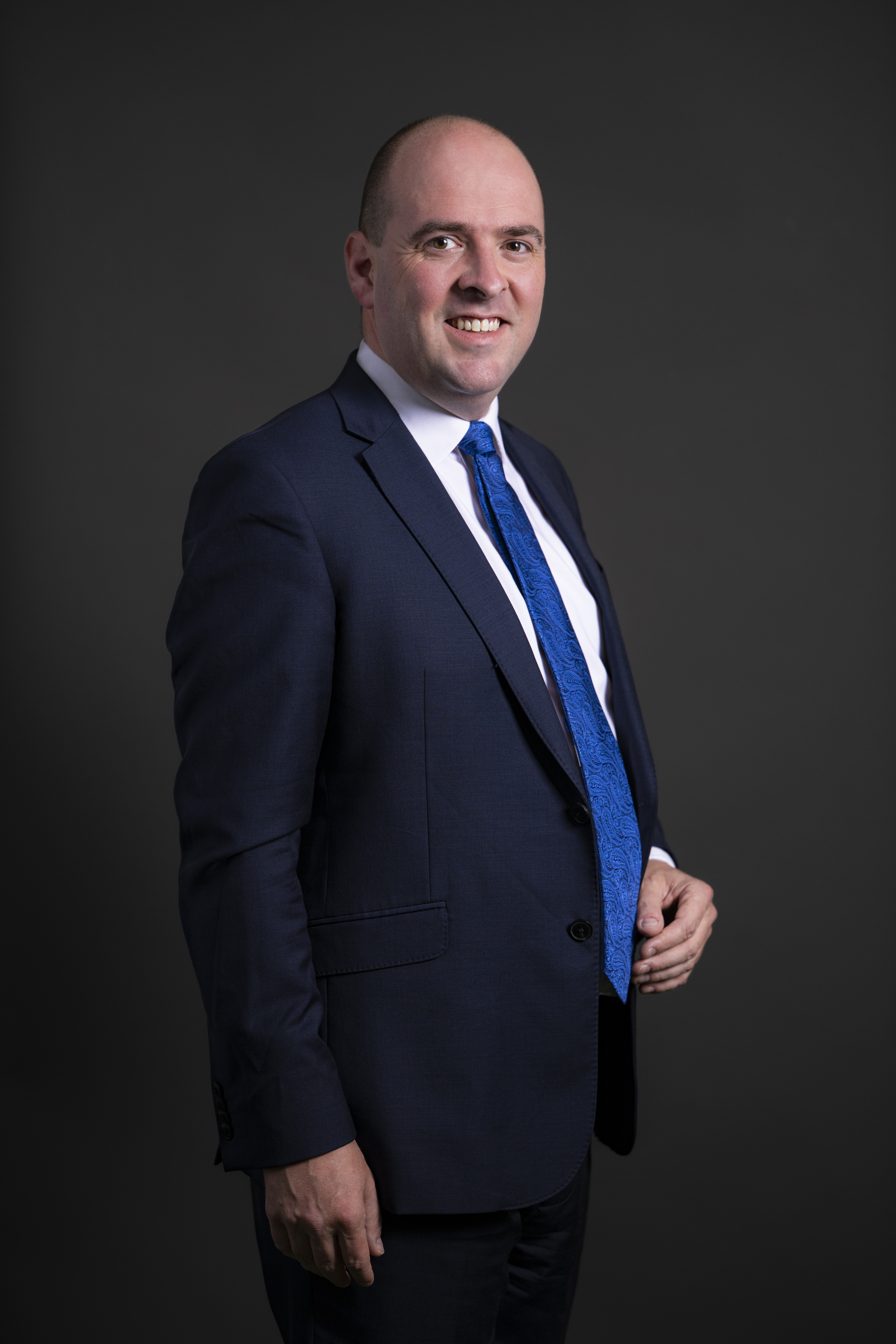
- Incumbent; Richard Holden since 22 July 2025
- Shadow Cabinet of the United Kingdom
- Reports to: Leader of the Opposition
- Appointer: Leader of the Opposition
- Website: The Shadow Cabinet

The shadow secretary of state for transport is a political post in the United Kingdom. It has been consistently held by a member of the Official Opposition Shadow Cabinet since May 1979. The shadow secretary helps hold the transport secretary and junior ministers to account and is the lead spokesperson on transport matters for their party. Should the relevant party take office, the shadow secretary would be a likely candidate to become the transport secretary.

At various times, the post has been called Shadow Minister for Transport (including from 1979 to 1981), Shadow Secretary of State for the Environment, Transport and the Regions, Shadow Secretary of State for Transport, Local Government and the Regions, and Shadow Secretary of State for Environment and Transport.

== Shadow secretaries of state ==
=== Shadow Minister of Transport ===
Name	Took office	Left office	Political party	Shadow Cabinet
George Strauss	15 July 1955	16 November 1959	Labour	Attlee
George Strauss	15 July 1955	16 November 1959	Labour	Gaitskell
Tony Benn	16 November 1959	28 November 1960	Labour	Gaitskell
George Strauss	28 November 1960	16 October 1964	Labour	Gaitskell
George Strauss	28 November 1960	16 October 1964	Labour	Brown
George Strauss	28 November 1960	16 October 1964	Labour	Wilson
Ernest Marples	16 October 1964	29 October 1964	Conservative	Douglas-Home
Enoch Powell	29 October 1964	4 August 1965	Conservative	Douglas-Home
Martin Redmayne	4 August 1965	19 April 1966	Conservative	Heath
Peter Walker	19 April 1966	14 November 1968	Conservative	Heath
Margaret Thatcher	14 November 1968	21 October 1969	Conservative	Heath
Peter Walker	21 October 1969	19 June 1970	Conservative	Heath
Fred Mulley	19 June 1970	4 March 1974	Labour	Wilson II
Unknown	4 March 1974	15 January 1976	Conservative	Heath II
Unknown	4 March 1974	15 January 1976	Conservative	Thatcher
Norman Fowler	15 January 1976	4 May 1979	Conservative	Thatcher
William Rodgers	4 May 1979	14 June 1979	Labour	Callaghan
Albert Booth (Note: Booth was Shadow Minister of Transport until September 1981, when the Minister of Transport became Secretary of State for Transport.)	14 June 1979	September 1981	Labour	Callaghan
Albert Booth	14 June 1979	September 1981	Labour	Foot
=== Shadow Secretary of State for Transport ===
Shadow Secretary	Took office	Left office	Political party	Shadow Cabinet
Albert Booth	September 1981	31 October 1983	Labour	Foot
John Prescott	31 October 1983	26 October 1984	Labour	Kinnock
Gwyneth Dunwoody	26 October 1984	4 November 1985	Labour	Kinnock
Robert Hughes	4 November 1985	23 November 1988	Labour	Kinnock
John Prescott	23 November 1988	21 October 1993	Labour	Kinnock
John Prescott	23 November 1988	21 October 1993	Labour	Smith
Frank Dobson	21 October 1993	20 October 1994	Labour	Smith
Frank Dobson	21 October 1993	20 October 1994	Labour	Beckett
Michael Meacher	20 October 1994	19 October 1995	Labour	Blair
Clare Short	19 October 1995	25 July 1996	Labour	Blair
Andrew Smith	25 July 1996	2 May 1997	Labour	Blair
Sir George Young	2 May 1997	June 1997	Conservative	Major
=== Shadow Secretary of State for the Environment, Transport and the Regions ===
Name	Took office	Left office	Political party	Shadow Cabinet
Norman Fowler	June 1997	1 June 1998	Conservative	Hague
Gillian Shepherd	1 June 1998	14 June 1999	Conservative	Hague
John Redwood	14 June 1999	2 February 2000	Conservative	Hague
Archie Norman	2 February 2000	18 September 2001	Conservative	Hague
=== Shadow Secretary of State for Transport, Local Government and the Regions ===
Name	Took office	Left office	Political party	Shadow Cabinet
Theresa May	18 September 2001	23 July 2002	Conservative	Duncan Smith
=== Shadow Secretary of State for Transport ===
Name	Took office	Left office	Political party	Shadow Cabinet
Tim Collins	23 July 2002	10 November 2003	Conservative	Duncan Smith
Damian Green (Note: During this period, Michael Howard had a small Shadow Cabinet, with members heading "super" Shadow Departments. The Shadow Transport Secretary was part of the Shadow Environment and Transport team, which was headed by the Shadow Secretary of State for Environment and Transport. Theresa May first held this latter office, and was replaced by Tim Yeo on 14 June 2004. When Damian Green resigned from the frontbench during a reshuffle on 8 September 2004, Yeo took on his responsibilities.)	10 November 2003	8 September 2004	Conservative	Howard
=== Shadow Secretary of State for Environment and Transport ===
Name	Took office	Left office	Political party	Shadow Cabinet
Tim Yeo	8 September 2004	10 May 2005	Conservative	Howard
=== Shadow Secretary of State for Transport ===
Name	Took office	Left office	Political party	Shadow Cabinet
Alan Duncan	6 May 2005	8 December 2005	Conservative	Howard
Chris Grayling	8 December 2005	2 July 2007	Conservative	Cameron
Theresa Villiers	2 July 2007	11 May 2010	Conservative	Cameron
Sadiq Khan	14 May 2010	8 October 2010	Labour	Harman
Maria Eagle	8 October 2010	7 October 2013	Labour	Miliband
Mary Creagh	7 October 2013	5 November 2014	Labour	Miliband
Michael Dugher	5 November 2014	13 September 2015	Labour	Miliband
Michael Dugher	5 November 2014	13 September 2015	Labour	Harman II
Lilian Greenwood	13 September 2015	26 June 2016	Labour	Corbyn
Andy McDonald	27 June 2016	6 April 2020	Labour	Corbyn
Jim McMahon	6 April 2020	29 November 2021	Labour	Starmer
Louise Haigh	29 November 2021	5 July 2024	Labour	Starmer
Helen Whately	8 July 2024	5 November 2024	Conservative	Sunak
Gareth Bacon	5 November 2024	22 July 2025	Conservative	Badenoch
Richard Holden	22 July 2025	Incumbent	Conservative	Badenoch
