= Shadow Secretary of State for Health and Social Care =

British Shadow Cabinet office

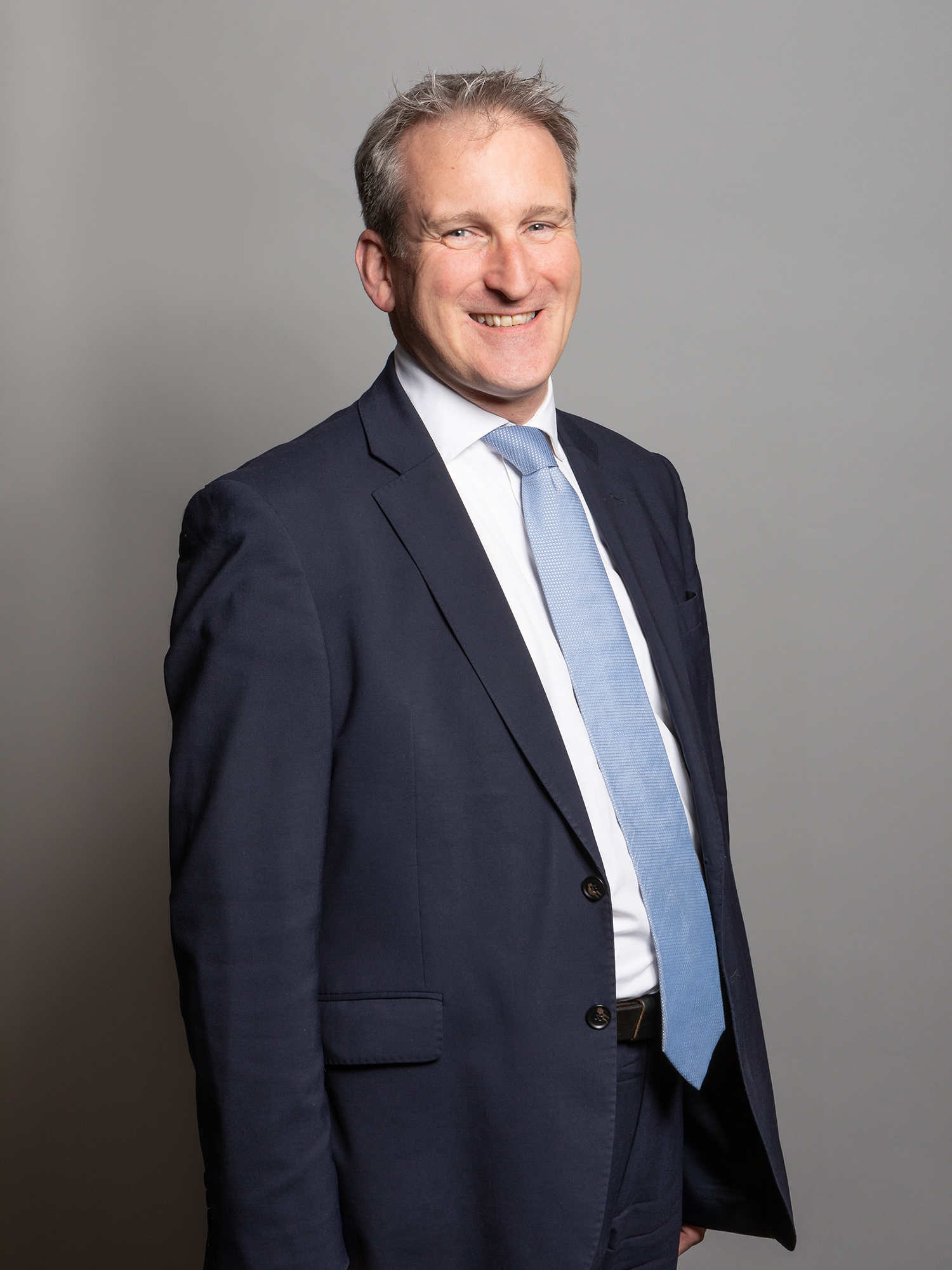
- Incumbent; Damian Hinds since 31 August 2026
- Appointer: Leader of the Opposition
- Website: The Shadow Cabinet

The shadow secretary of state for health and social care is an office within British politics held by a member of His Majesty's Loyal Opposition. The duty of the office holder is to scrutinise the actions of the government's secretary of state for health and social care and develop alternative policies. The office holder is a member of the Shadow Cabinet and appointed by the leader of the opposition.

It is currently held by Damian Hinds.

== List of shadow secretaries ==
=== Shadow Minister for Health ===
Name	Entered office	Left office	Political party	Shadow Cabinet	Ref
Edith Summerskill	15 July 1955	November 1961	Labour	Gaitskell	
Kenneth Robinson	November 1961	16 October 1964	Labour	Gaitskell	
Kenneth Robinson	November 1961	16 October 1964	Labour	Wilson	
=== Shadow Minister for Social Services ===
Name	Entered office	Left office	Political party	Shadow Cabinet	Ref
Bernard Braine	16 October 1964	29 October 1964	Conservative	Douglas-Home	
Keith Joseph	29 October 1964	19 April 1966	Conservative	Douglas-Home	
Keith Joseph	29 October 1964	19 April 1966	Conservative	Heath	
Mervyn Pike	19 April 1966	10 October 1967	Conservative	Heath	
Robert Lindsay	10 October 1967	1 November 1968	Conservative	Heath	
=== Shadow Secretary of State for Health and Social Services ===
Name	Entered office	Left office	Political party	Shadow Cabinet	Ref
Robert Lindsay	1 November 1968	19 June 1970	Conservative	Heath	
Richard Crossman	19 June 1970	23 July 1970	Labour	Wilson II	
Shirley Williams	23 July 1970	19 October 1971	Labour	Wilson II	
Barbara Castle	19 October 1971	6 December 1972	Labour	Wilson II	
John Silkin	6 December 1972	4 March 1974	Labour	Wilson II	
Keith Joseph	4 March 1974	11 March 1974	Conservative	Heath II	
Geoffrey Howe	11 March 1974	18 February 1975	Conservative	Heath II	
Norman Fowler	18 February 1975	19 November 1976	Conservative	Thatcher	
Patrick Jenkin	19 November 1976	4 May 1979	Conservative	Thatcher	
David Ennals	4 May 1979	14 June 1979	Labour	Callaghan	
Stanley Orme	14 June 1979	8 December 1980	Labour	Callaghan	
Gwyneth Dunwoody	8 December 1980	31 October 1983	Labour	Foot	
Michael Meacher	31 October 1983	13 July 1987	Labour	Kinnock	
Robin Cook	13 July 1987	25 July 1988	Labour	Kinnock	
=== Shadow Secretary of State for Health ===
Name	Entered office	Left office	Political party	Shadow Cabinet	Ref
Robin Cook	25 July 1988	18 July 1992	Labour	Kinnock	
David Blunkett	18 July 1992	20 October 1994	Labour	Smith	
David Blunkett	18 July 1992	20 October 1994	Labour	Beckett	
Margaret Beckett	20 October 1994	19 October 1995	Labour	Blair	
Harriet Harman	19 October 1995	1 July 1996	Labour	Blair	
Chris Smith	1 July 1996	2 May 1997	Labour	Blair	
Stephen Dorrell	2 May 1997	11 June 1997	Conservative	Major	
John Maples	11 June 1997	1 June 1998	Conservative	Hague	
Ann Widdecombe	1 June 1998	13 January 1999	Conservative	Hague	
Liam Fox	13 January 1999	6 November 2003	Conservative	Hague	
Liam Fox	13 January 1999	6 November 2003	Conservative	Duncan Smith	
Tim Yeo	6 November 2003	19 June 2004	Conservative	Howard	
Andrew Lansley	19 June 2004	12 May 2010	Conservative	Howard	
Andrew Lansley	19 June 2004	12 May 2010	Conservative	Cameron	
Andy Burnham	12 May 2010	8 October 2010	Labour	Harman	
John Healey	8 October 2010	6 October 2011	Labour	Miliband	
Andy Burnham	7 October 2011	13 September 2015	Labour	Miliband	
Andy Burnham	7 October 2011	13 September 2015	Labour	Harman II	
Heidi Alexander	13 September 2015	26 June 2016	Labour	Corbyn	
Diane Abbott	27 June 2016	6 October 2016	Labour	Corbyn	
Jonathan Ashworth	7 October 2016	8 January 2018	Labour	Corbyn	
=== Shadow Secretary of State for Health and Social Care ===
Name	Entered office	Left office	Political party	Shadow Cabinet	Ref
Jonathan Ashworth	8 January 2018	29 November 2021	Labour	Corbyn	
Jonathan Ashworth	8 January 2018	29 November 2021	Labour	Starmer	
Wes Streeting	29 November 2021	5 July 2024	Labour	Starmer	
Victoria Atkins	8 July 2024	5 November 2024	Conservative	Sunak	
Ed Argar	5 November 2024	22 July 2025	Conservative	Badenoch	
Stuart Andrew	22 July 2025	31 August 2026	Conservative	Badenoch	
Damian Hinds	31 August 2026	incumbent	Conservative	Badenoch	
