= Badenoch shadow cabinet =

UK shadow cabinet since 2024

Badenoch Shadow Cabinet
- Shadow cabinet of the United Kingdom
- 2 November 2024–present
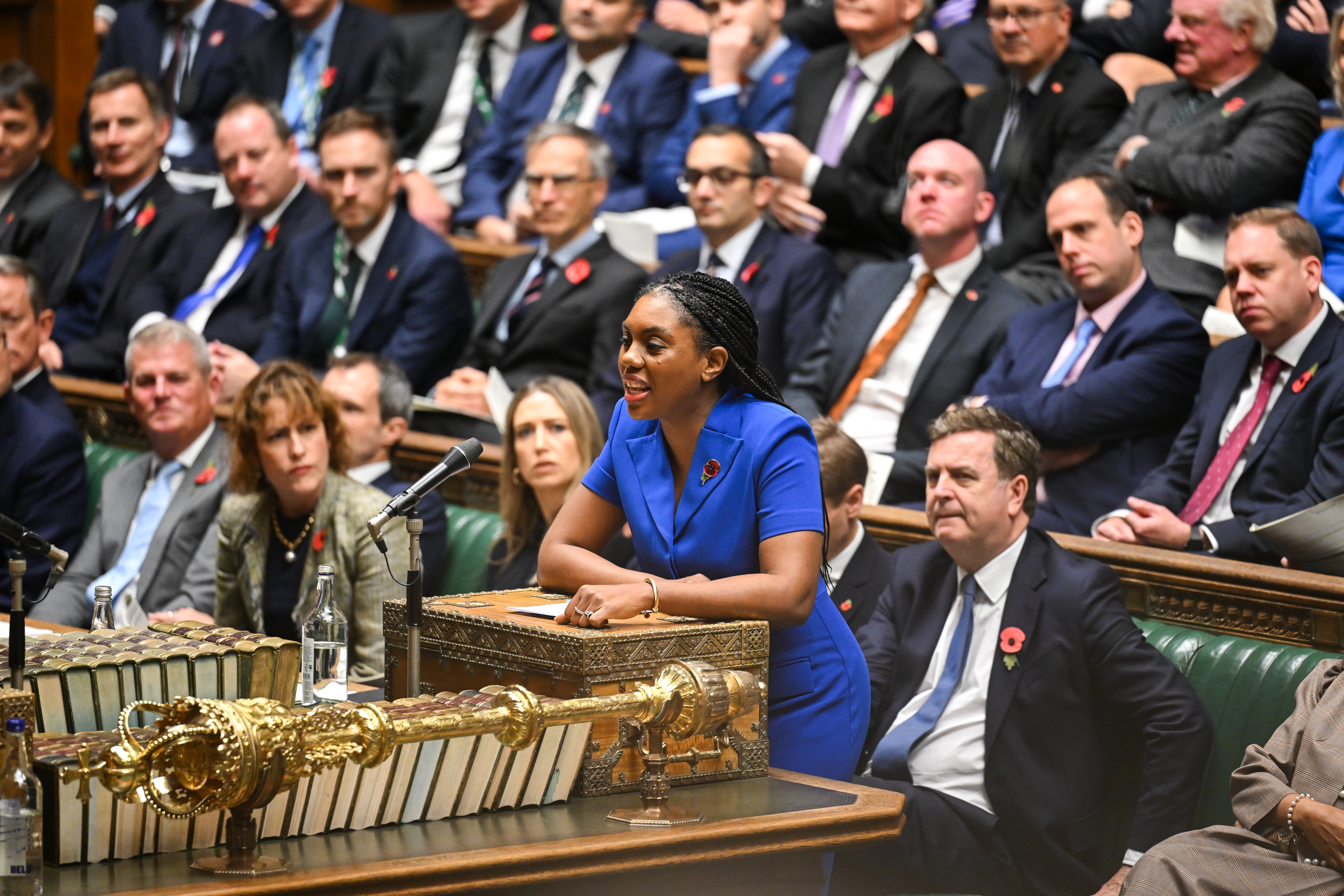
- Badenoch with members of her shadow cabinet during a session of Prime Minister's Questions in November 2024
- Date formed: 2 November 2024

People and organisations
- Monarch: Charles III
- Leader of the Opposition: Kemi Badenoch
- Deputy Leader of the Opposition: Alex Burghart (2026–present)
- Member party: Conservative
- Status in legislature: Official Opposition

History
- Incoming formation: 2024 Conservative leadership election
- Legislature terms: 2024–present
- Predecessor: Sunak shadow cabinet

Kemi Badenoch has served as the Leader of the Opposition and Leader of the Conservative Party since 2 November 2024, following her victory in the 2024 Conservative Leadership election. The election was triggered by Rishi Sunak's resignation as party leader following the 2024 general election, which the Labour Party under Keir Starmer won.

== Formation ==
Badenoch hinted in a speech after her election victory that Robert Jenrick, her opponent in the election, might be offered a senior job, telling him "you have a key role in our party for years to come". Subsequently, two days later, Jenrick was appointed both Shadow Lord Chancellor and Shadow Secretary of State for Justice. The first appointment, made a day after the leadership election result was announced, saw Dame Rebecca Harris installed as Chief Whip.

== Shadow cabinet appointments ==
Key
Sits in the House of Commons
Sits in the House of Lords

=== November 2024 – July 2025 ===
Portfolio	Shadow Minister	Constituency	Term
Shadow cabinet ministers
Leader of the Opposition; Leader of the Conservative Party	The Rt Hon; Kemi Badenoch; MP	North West Essex	November 2024 – present
Shadow Chancellor of the Exchequer	The Rt Hon; Sir Mel Stride; MP	Central Devon	November 2024 – August 2026
Shadow Secretary of State for Foreign, Commonwealth and Development Affairs	The Rt Hon; Dame Priti Patel; DBE MP	Witham	November 2024 – August 2026
Shadow Home Secretary	The Rt Hon; Chris Philp; MP	Croydon South	November 2024 – present
Shadow Secretary of State for Defence	James Cartlidge; MP	South Suffolk	July 2024 – present
Shadow Lord Chancellor; Shadow Secretary of State for Justice	The Rt Hon; Robert Jenrick; MP	Newark	November 2024 – January 2026
Shadow Secretary of State for Science, Innovation and Technology	Alan Mak; MP	Havant	November 2024 – July 2025
Shadow Secretary of State for Health and Social Care	The Rt Hon; Edward Argar; MP	Melton and Syston	November 2024 – July 2025
Shadow Secretary of State for Housing, Communities and Local Government	Kevin Hollinrake; MP	Thirsk and Malton	November 2024 – July 2025
Shadow Secretary of State for Environment, Food and Rural Affairs	The Rt Hon; Victoria Atkins; MP	Louth and Horncastle	November 2024 – present
Shadow Leader of the House of Commons	The Rt Hon; Jesse Norman; MP	Hereford and South Herefordshire	November 2024 – present
Shadow Leader of the House of Lords	The Rt Hon; The Lord True; CBE PC	Member of the House of Lords	July 2024 – present
Shadow Secretary of State for Business and Trade	Andrew Griffith; MP	Arundel and South Downs	November 2024 – August 2026
Shadow Secretary of State for Energy Security and Net Zero; Shadow Minister for Equalities	The Rt Hon; Claire Coutinho; MP	East Surrey	July 2024 – August 2026
Shadow Secretary of State for Work and Pensions	Helen Whately; MP	Faversham and Mid Kent	November 2024 – present
Shadow Secretary of State for Education	The Rt Hon; Laura Trott; MBE MP	Sevenoaks	November 2024 – present
Shadow Secretary of State for Transport	Gareth Bacon; MP	Orpington	November 2024 – July 2025
Shadow Secretary of State for Culture, Media and Sport	The Rt Hon; Stuart Andrew; MP	Daventry	November 2024 – July 2025
Shadow Chancellor of the Duchy of Lancaster	Alex Burghart; MP	Brentwood and Ongar	November 2024 – present
Shadow Secretary of State for Northern Ireland	Alex Burghart; MP	Brentwood and Ongar	July 2024 – present
Shadow Secretary of State for Scotland	Andrew Bowie; MP	West Aberdeenshire and Kincardine	November 2024 – August 2026
Shadow Secretary of State for Wales	Mims Davies; MP	East Grinstead and Uckfield	November 2024 – present
Shadow Minister for Women	Mims Davies; MP	East Grinstead and Uckfield	July 2024 – August 2026
Chairman of the Conservative Party	Nigel Huddleston; MP	Droitwich and Evesham	November 2024 – July 2025
Chairman of the Conservative Party	The Rt Hon; The Lord Johnson of Lainston; CBE	Member of the House of Lords	November 2024 – July 2025
Also attending shadow cabinet meetings
Opposition Chief Whip of the House of Commons	Dame Rebecca Harris; DBE MP	Castle Point	November 2024 – present
Shadow Chief Secretary to the Treasury	Richard Fuller; CBE MP	North Bedfordshire	November 2024 – present
Shadow Attorney General	The Rt Hon; The Lord Wolfson of Tredegar; KC	Member of the House of Lords	November 2024 – present

=== Changes ===
Changes from Sunak's shadow cabinet to Badenoch's Shadow Cabinet.

- Jeremy Hunt (Shadow Chancellor of the Exchequer) returned to the backbenches and was succeeded by Mel Stride.
- James Cleverly (Shadow Home Secretary) returned to the backbenches and was succeeded by Chris Philp.
- Rishi Sunak (former Prime Minister, Leader of the Opposition and Leader of the Conservative Party) returned to the backbenches.
- Steve Barclay (Shadow Environment Secretary) returned to the backbenches and was succeeded by Victoria Atkins.
- Sir Oliver Dowden (former Deputy Prime Minister and Deputy Leader of the Opposition/Shadow Chancellor of the Duchy of Lancaster) returned to the backbenches and was succeeded by Alex Burghart.
- Stuart Andrew (Opposition Chief Whip of the House of Commons) was succeeded by Dame Rebecca Harris.
- Damian Hinds (Shadow Education Secretary) was succeeded by Laura Trott.
- Andrew Mitchell (Shadow Foreign Secretary) was succeeded by Dame Priti Patel.
- Edward Argar (Shadow Secretary of State for Justice) was succeeded by Robert Jenrick.
- Byron Davies, Baron Davies of Gower (Shadow Secretary of State for Wales) became a junior Shadow Minister in the Home Office and was succeeded by Mims Davies.

=== July 2025 – August 2026 ===
Official Opposition Shadow Cabinet of the United Kingdom
Portfolio	Shadow Minister	Constituency	Term
Shadow cabinet ministers
Leader of the Opposition; Leader of the Conservative Party	The Rt Hon; Kemi Badenoch; MP	North West Essex	November 2024 – present
Shadow Chancellor of the Exchequer	The Rt Hon; Sir Mel Stride; MP	Central Devon	November 2024 – present
Shadow Secretary of State for Foreign, Commonwealth and Development Affairs	The Rt Hon; Dame Priti Patel; DBE MP	Witham	November 2024 – August 2026
Shadow Home Secretary	The Rt Hon; Chris Philp; MP	Croydon South	November 2024 – present
Shadow Secretary of State for Defence	James Cartlidge; MP	South Suffolk	July 2024 – present
Shadow Lord Chancellor; Shadow Secretary of State for Justice	The Rt Hon; Robert Jenrick; MP	Newark	November 2024 – January 2026
Shadow Lord Chancellor; Shadow Secretary of State for Justice	Nick Timothy; CBE MP	West Suffolk	January 2026 – present
Shadow Secretary of State for Science, Innovation and Technology	Julia Lopez; MP	Hornchurch and Upminster	July 2025 – present
Shadow Secretary of State for Health and Social Care	The Rt Hon; Stuart Andrew; MP	Daventry	July 2025 – August 2026
Shadow Secretary of State for Housing, Communities and Local Government	The Rt Hon; Sir James Cleverly; TD VR MP	Braintree	July 2025 – August 2026
Shadow Secretary of State for Environment, Food and Rural Affairs	The Rt Hon; Victoria Atkins; MP	Louth and Horncastle	November 2024 – present
Shadow Leader of the House of Commons	The Rt Hon; Jesse Norman; MP	Hereford and South Herefordshire	November 2024 – present
Shadow Leader of the House of Lords	The Rt Hon; The Lord True; CBE PC	Member of the House of Lords	July 2024 – present
Shadow Secretary of State for Business and Trade	Andrew Griffith; MP	Arundel and South Downs	November 2024 – present
Shadow Secretary of State for Energy Security and Net Zero	The Rt Hon; Claire Coutinho; MP	East Surrey	July 2024 – present
Shadow Minister for Equalities	The Rt Hon; Claire Coutinho; MP	East Surrey	November 2024 – present
Shadow Secretary of State for Work and Pensions	Helen Whately; MP	Faversham and Mid Kent	November 2024 – present
Shadow Secretary of State for Education	The Rt Hon; Laura Trott; MBE MP	Sevenoaks	November 2024 – present
Shadow Secretary of State for Transport	The Rt Hon; Richard Holden; MP	Basildon and Billericay	July 2025 – present
Shadow Secretary of State for Culture, Media and Sport	Nigel Huddleston; MP	Droitwich and Evesham	July 2025 – present
Shadow Chancellor of the Duchy of Lancaster	Alex Burghart; MP	Brentwood and Ongar	November 2024 – present
Shadow Secretary of State for Northern Ireland	Alex Burghart; MP	Brentwood and Ongar	July 2024 – present
Shadow Secretary of State for Scotland	Andrew Bowie; MP	West Aberdeenshire and Kincardine	November 2024 – present
Shadow Secretary of State for Wales	Mims Davies; MP	East Grinstead and Uckfield	November 2024 – present
Shadow Minister for Women	Mims Davies; MP	East Grinstead and Uckfield	July 2024 – August 2026
Shadow Minister without Portfolio; Chairman of the Conservative Party	Kevin Hollinrake; MP	Thirsk and Malton	July 2025 – present
Also attending shadow cabinet meetings
Opposition Chief Whip of the House of Commons	Dame Rebecca Harris; DBE MP	Castle Point	November 2024 – present
Shadow Chief Secretary to the Treasury	Richard Fuller; CBE MP	North Bedfordshire	November 2024 – present
Shadow Attorney General	The Rt Hon; The Lord Wolfson of Tredegar; KC	Member of the House of Lords	November 2024 – present
Shadow Minister for Policy Renewal and Development	Neil O'Brien; OBE MP	Harborough, Oadby and Wigston	July 2025 – present

=== Changes ===
==== July 2025 ====
- Edward Argar (Shadow Secretary of State for Health and Social Care) returned to the backbenches and was succeeded by Stuart Andrew.
- Stuart Andrew was succeeded as Shadow Secretary of State for Culture, Media and Sport by Nigel Huddleston.
- Nigel Huddleston was succeeded as Chairman of the Conservative Party by Kevin Hollinrake.
- Kevin Hollinrake was succeeded as Shadow Secretary of State for Housing, Communities and Local Government by Sir James Cleverly.
- Alan Mak (Shadow Secretary of State for Science, Innovation and Technology) returned to the backbenches and was succeeded by Julia Lopez.
- Gareth Bacon (Shadow Secretary of State for Transport) was succeeded by Richard Holden.
- Neil O'Brien was promoted to the Shadow Cabinet in the new role of Shadow Minister for Policy Renewal and Development.

==== January 2026 ====
- Robert Jenrick (Shadow Lord Chancellor) was dismissed from the Shadow Cabinet and was suspended from the Conservative Party after it was accurately alleged that he was plotting to defect to Reform UK, he was succeeded by backbencher Nick Timothy.

=== August 2026 – present ===
Official Opposition Shadow Cabinet of the United Kingdom
Portfolio	Shadow Minister	Constituency	Term
Shadow cabinet ministers
Leader of the Opposition; Leader of the Conservative Party	The Rt Hon; Kemi Badenoch; MP	North West Essex	November 2024 – present
Deputy Leader of the Conservative Party; Deputy Leader of the Opposition	Alex Burghart; MP	Brentwood and Ongar	August 2026 – present
Shadow Chancellor of the Duchy of Lancaster	Alex Burghart; MP	Brentwood and Ongar	November 2024 – present
Shadow Secretary of State for Northern Ireland	Alex Burghart; MP	Brentwood and Ongar	July 2024 – present
Shadow Chancellor of the Exchequer	Andrew Griffith; MP	Arundel and South Downs	August 2026 – present
Shadow Secretary of State for Foreign, Commonwealth and Development Affairs	Lieutenant Colonel; The Rt Hon; Tom Tugendhat; MBE VR MP	Tonbridge	August 2026 – present
Shadow Home Secretary	The Rt Hon; Chris Philp; MP	Croydon South	November 2024 – present
Shadow Secretary of State for Defence	James Cartlidge; MP	South Suffolk	July 2024 – present
Shadow Lord Chancellor; Shadow Secretary of State for Justice	Nick Timothy; CBE MP	West Suffolk	January 2026 – present
Shadow Secretary of State for Health and Social Care	The Rt Hon; Damian Hinds; MP	East Hampshire	August 2026 – present
Shadow Secretary of State for Housing, Communities and Local Government	Katie Lam; MP	Weald of Kent	August 2026 – present
Shadow Secretary of State for Environment, Food and Rural Affairs	The Rt Hon; Victoria Atkins; MP	Louth and Horncastle	November 2024 – present
Shadow Leader of the House of Commons	The Rt Hon; Jesse Norman; MP	Hereford and South Herefordshire	November 2024 – present
Shadow Leader of the House of Lords	The Rt Hon; The Lord True CBE PC	Member of the House of Lords	July 2024 – present
Shadow Secretary of State for Business, Innovation, Science and Trade	The Rt Hon; Claire Coutinho; MP	East Surrey	August 2026 (Note: On Maternity Leave from August 2026 until January 2027) – present
Shadow Secretary of State for Business, Innovation, Science and Trade	Julia Lopez; MP	Hornchurch and Upminster	August 2026 (Note: Lopez temporarily served in the position during the maternity leave of Coutinho) – January 2027
Shadow Secretary of State for Energy Security and Net Zero	Andrew Bowie; MP	West Aberdeenshire and Kincardine	August 2026 – present
Shadow Secretary of State for Work and Pensions	Helen Whately; MP	Faversham and Mid Kent	November 2024 – present
Shadow Secretary of State for Education	The Rt Hon; Laura Trott; MBE MP	Sevenoaks	November 2024 – present
Shadow Secretary of State for Transport	The Rt Hon; Richard Holden; MP	Basildon and Billericay	July 2025 – present
Shadow Secretary of State for Digital Culture, Media and Sport	Rebecca Paul; MP	Reigate	August 2026 – present
Shadow Secretary of State for Scotland	Harriet Cross; MP	Gordon and Buchan	August 2026 – present
Shadow Secretary of State for Wales	Mims Davies; MP	East Grinstead and Uckfield	November 2024 – present
Shadow Minister for Women and Equalities	Joy Morrissey; MP	Beaconsfield	August 2026 – present
Shadow Minister without Portfolio; Chairman of the Conservative Party	Kevin Hollinrake; MP	Thirsk and Malton	July 2025 – present
Also attending shadow cabinet meetings
Opposition Chief Whip of the House of Commons	Dame Rebecca Harris; DBE MP	Castle Point	November 2024 – present
Shadow Chief Secretary to the Treasury	Richard Fuller; CBE MP	North Bedfordshire	November 2024 – present
Shadow Attorney General	The Lord Wolfson of Tredegar; KC	Member of the House of Lords	November 2024 – present
Shadow Minister for Policy Renewal and Development	Neil O'Brien; OBE MP	Harborough, Oadby and Wigston	July 2025 – present

=== Changes ===
- James Cleverly resigned as Shadow Secretary of State for Housing, Communities and Local Government to stand in the 2028 London mayoral election. He was succeeded by Katie Lam.
- Dame Priti Patel resigned as Shadow Foreign Secretary to take on New Conservative Party International Role and to return to the backbenches. She was succeeded by Tom Tugendhat.
- Sir Mel Stride was replaced as Shadow Chancellor of the Exchequer by Andrew Griffith.
- Griffith was replaced as Shadow Business Secretary by Claire Coutinho. Julia Lopez was appointed in her place ad interim due to Coutinho's maternity leave.
- Coutinho was replaced as Shadow Energy Secretary by Andrew Bowie.
- Bowie was replaced as Shadow Scotland Secretary by Harriet Cross.
- Stuart Andrew was replaced as Shadow Health Secretary by Damian Hinds
- Mims Davies and Claire Coutinho were replaced as Ministers for Women and Equalities by Joy Morrissey.
- Nigel Huddleston was replaced as Shadow Culture Secretary by Rebecca Paul.
