= Shadow Secretary of State for Defence =

British cabinet secretary for the Ministry of Defence

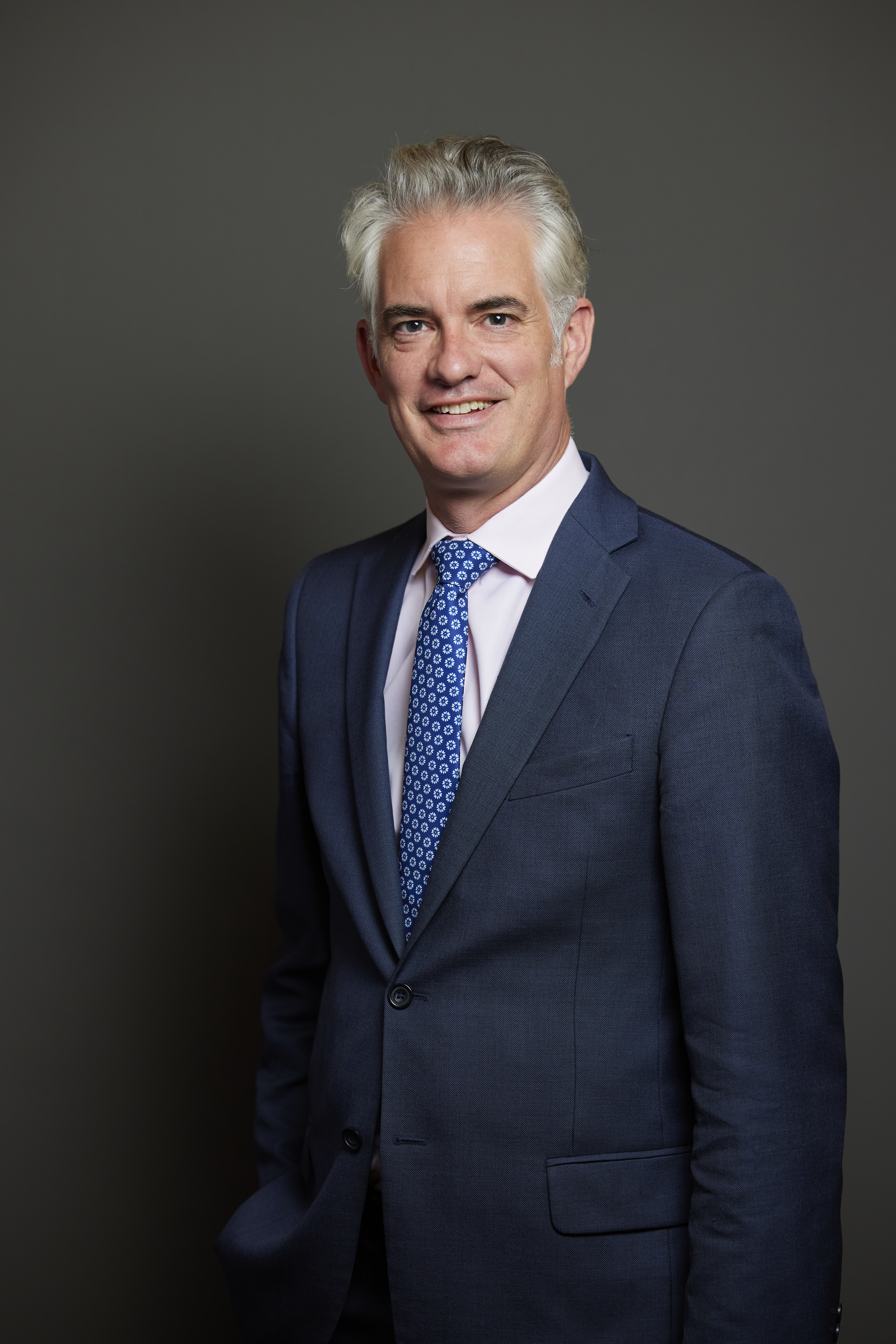
- Incumbent; James Cartlidge since 8 July 2024
- Member of: Opposition Shadow Cabinet
- Appointer: Leader of the Opposition
- Inaugural holder: Richard Stokes

The shadow secretary of state for defence is a member of the UK Shadow Cabinet responsible for the scrutiny of the secretary of state for defence and the department, the Ministry of Defence. The post is currently held by James Cartlidge.

== List of shadow secretaries for defence ==
=== Shadow ministers of defence ===
Name	Entered office	Left office	Political party	Shadow Cabinet
Richard Stokes	15 July 1955	30 November 1956	Labour	Clement Attlee
Richard Stokes	15 July 1955	30 November 1956	Labour	Gaitskell
George Brown	30 November 1956	30 November 1961	Labour	Gaitskell
Patrick Gordon Walker	30 November 1961	22 February 1963	Labour	Gaitskell
Patrick Gordon Walker	30 November 1961	22 February 1963	Labour	Brown
Denis Healey	22 February 1963	1 April 1964	Labour	Wilson I
=== Shadow secretaries of state for defence ===
Name	Entered office	Left office	Political party	Shadow Cabinet
Denis Healey	1 April 1964	16 October 1964	Labour	Wilson I
Peter Thorneycroft	16 October 1964	16 February 1965	Conservative	Douglas-Home
Christopher Soames	16 February 1965	4 August 1965	Conservative	Douglas-Home
Enoch Powell	4 August 1965	21 April 1968	Conservative	Heath I
Reginald Maudling	21 April 1968	14 November 1968	Conservative	Heath I
Geoffrey Rippon	14 November 1968	19 June 1970	Conservative	Heath I
Denis Healey	19 June 1970	24 July 1970	Labour	Wilson II
George Thomson	24 July 1970	10 April 1972	Labour	Wilson II
Roy Hattersley	11 April 1972	7 December 1972	Labour	Wilson II
Fred Peart	7 December 1972	4 March 1974	Labour	Wilson II
Ian Gilmour	4 March 1974	19 June 1974	Conservative	Heath II
Peter Walker	19 June 1974	18 February 1975	Conservative	Heath II
George Younger	18 February 1975	15 January 1976	Conservative	Thatcher
Ian Gilmour	15 January 1976	4 May 1979	Conservative	Thatcher
Fred Mulley	4 May 1979	14 June 1979	Labour	Callaghan
William Rodgers	14 June 1979	8 December 1980	Labour	Callaghan
Brynmor John	8 December 1980	24 November 1981	Labour	Foot
John Silkin	24 November 1981	26 October 1984	Labour	Foot
John Silkin	24 November 1981	26 October 1984	Labour	Kinnock
Denzil Davies	26 October 1984	14 June 1988	Labour	Kinnock
Martin O'Neill	14 June 1988	18 July 1992	Labour	Kinnock
David Clark	18 July 1992	2 May 1997	Labour	Smith
David Clark	18 July 1992	2 May 1997	Labour	Beckett
David Clark	18 July 1992	2 May 1997	Labour	Blair
John Major	2 May 1997	11 June 1997	Conservative	Major
George Young	11 June 1997	1 June 1998	Conservative	Hague
John Maples	1 June 1998	15 June 1999	Conservative	Hague
Iain Duncan Smith	15 June 1999	18 September 2001	Conservative	Hague
Bernard Jenkin	18 September 2001	6 November 2003	Conservative	Duncan Smith
Nicholas Soames	6 November 2003	10 May 2005	Conservative	Howard
Michael Ancram	10 May 2005	6 December 2005	Conservative	Howard
Liam Fox	7 December 2005	11 May 2010	Conservative	Cameron
Bob Ainsworth	12 May 2010	8 October 2010	Labour	Harman I
Jim Murphy	8 October 2010	7 October 2013	Labour	Miliband
Vernon Coaker	7 October 2013	14 September 2015	Labour	Miliband
Vernon Coaker	7 October 2013	14 September 2015	Labour	Harman II
Maria Eagle	14 September 2015	5 January 2016	Labour	Corbyn
Emily Thornberry	5 January 2016	27 June 2016	Labour	Corbyn
Clive Lewis	27 June 2016	6 October 2016	Labour	Corbyn
Nia Griffith	6 October 2016	6 April 2020	Labour	Corbyn
John Healey	6 April 2020	5 July 2024	Labour	Starmer
James Cartlidge	8 July 2024	Incumbent	Conservative	Sunak
James Cartlidge	8 July 2024	Incumbent	Conservative	Badenoch

== See also ==
- Secretary of State for Defence
- Ministry of Defence
- UK Shadow Cabinet
