= Second Wilson shadow cabinet =

Second Shadow Cabinet of Harold Wilson
- Shadow Cabinet of United Kingdom
- 1970 – 1974
- Date formed: 19 June 1970
- Date dissolved: 4 March 1974

People and organisations
- Monarch: Elizabeth II
- Leader of the Opposition: Harold Wilson
- Deputy Leader of the Opposition: Roy Jenkins (1970–72); Edward Short (1972–74)
- Member party: Labour Party
- Status in legislature: Official Opposition

History
- Incoming formation: 1970 United Kingdom general election
- Outgoing formation: February 1974 United Kingdom general election
- Legislature terms: 45th UK Parliament
- Predecessor: First Heath shadow cabinet
- Successor: Second Heath shadow cabinet

Harold Wilson of the Labour Party formed his Second Shadow Cabinet as Leader of Her Majesty's Most Loyal Opposition after losing the 1970 general election to Conservative Edward Heath.

He retained leadership of the Opposition for the length of the Heath ministry from 1970 to 1974. In February 1974, his party narrowly won an election. Wilson was then forced to form a minority government that lasted only until another election in October of that year. Following that election, Wilson formed a majority government.

== Shadow Cabinet list ==
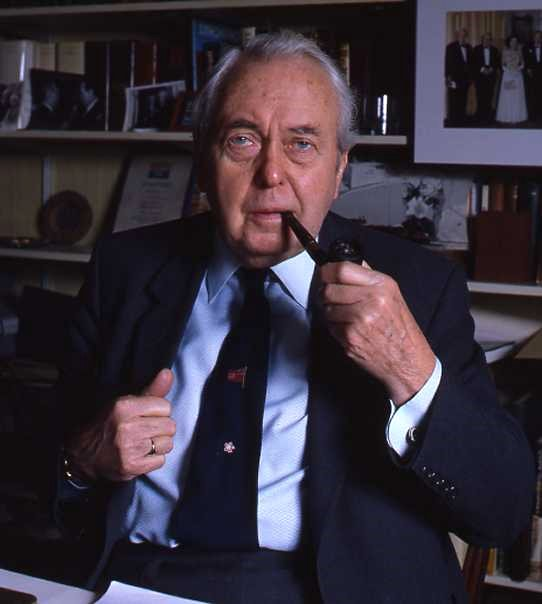
Harold Wilson, Leader of the Opposition (1970–1974)

Portfolio	Shadow Minister	Term
Leader of Her Majesty's Most Loyal Opposition; Leader of the Labour Party	The Rt Hon. Harold Wilson	1970 – 1974
Deputy Leader of the Opposition; Deputy Leader of the Labour Party	The Rt Hon. Roy Jenkins	1970 – 1972
Deputy Leader of the Opposition; Deputy Leader of the Labour Party	The Rt Hon. Edward Short	1972 – 1974
Shadow Chancellor of the Exchequer	The Rt Hon. Roy Jenkins	1970 – 1972
Shadow Chancellor of the Exchequer	The Rt Hon. Denis Healey	1972 – 1974
Shadow Leader of the House of Commons	The Rt Hon. Fred Peart	1970 – 1971
Shadow Leader of the House of Commons	The Rt Hon. Michael Foot	1971 – 1972
Shadow Leader of the House of Commons	The Rt Hon. Edward Short	1972 – 1974
Shadow Foreign Secretary	The Rt Hon. Denis Healey	1970 – 1972
Shadow Foreign Secretary	The Rt Hon. James Callaghan	1972 – 1974
Shadow Home Secretary	The Rt Hon. James Callaghan	1970 – 1971
Shadow Home Secretary	Shirley Williams	1971 – 1973
Shadow Home Secretary	The Rt Hon. Roy Jenkins	1973 – 1974
Shadow Secretary of State for Defence	The Rt Hon. George Thomson	1970 – 1972
Shadow Secretary of State for Defence	The Rt Hon. Fred Peart	1972 – 1974
Shadow Secretary of State for the Environment	The Rt Hon. Anthony Crosland	1970 – 1974
Shadow Secretary of State for Trade and Industry	The Rt Hon. Tony Benn	1970 – 1974
Shadow Secretary of State for Employment	The Rt Hon. Barbara Castle	1970 – 1971
Shadow Secretary of State for Employment	The Rt Hon. James Callaghan	1971 – 1972
Shadow Secretary of State for Employment	The Rt Hon. Reg Prentice	1972 – 1974
Shadow Secretary of State for Health and Social Services	Shirley Williams	1970 – 1971
Shadow Secretary of State for Health and Social Services	The Rt Hon. Barbara Castle	1971 – 1972
Shadow Secretary of State for Health and Social Services	John Silkin	1972 – 1974
Shadow Secretary of State for Education and Science	The Rt Hon. Edward Short	1970 – 1972
Shadow Secretary of State for Education and Science	The Rt Hon. Roy Hattersley	1972 – 1974
Shadow Minister of Fuel and Power	Michael Foot	1970 – 1971
Shadow Minister of Fuel and Power	The Rt Hon. Harold Lever	1971 – 1972
Shadow Minister of Fuel and Power	The Rt Hon. Eric Varley	1972 – 1974
Shadow Minister for Europe	The Rt Hon. Harold Lever	1970 – 1971
Shadow Minister for Europe	Peter Shore	1971 – 1972
Shadow Minister for Europe	Michael Foot	1972 – 1974
Shadow Secretary of State for Northern Ireland	The Rt Hon. Merlyn Rees	1972 – 1974
Other frontbenchers
Shadow Minister of Agriculture, Fisheries and Food	The Rt Hon. Cledwyn Hughes	1970 – 1971
Shadow Secretary of State for Scotland	The Rt Hon. William Ross	1970 – 1974
Shadow Secretary of State for Wales	George Thomas	1970 – 1974
Shadow President of the Board of Trade	Roy Mason	1970
Leader of the Opposition in the House of Lords	The Rt Hon.The Lord Shackleton PC	1970 – 1974
Opposition Chief Whip in the House of Commons	The Rt Hon. Bob Mellish	1970 – 1974
Opposition Chief Whip in the House of Lords	The Rt Hon. Baron Beswick	1970 – 1973
Opposition Chief Whip in the House of Lords	The Rt Hon. Baroness Llewelyn-Davies	1973 – 1974

== Initial Shadow Cabinet ==
Wilson announced his new Shadow Cabinet on 22 July 1970, following the election of Roy Jenkins as Deputy Leader and the Shadow Cabinet election. It featured three members who were not in the former cabinet, Foot, Williams and Houghton.

- Harold Wilson – Leader of Her Majesty's Most Loyal Opposition and Leader of the Labour Party
- Roy Jenkins – Deputy Leader of the Opposition, Deputy Leader of the Labour Party and Shadow Chancellor of the Exchequer
- Fred Peart – Shadow Leader of the House of Commons
- Denis Healey – Shadow Foreign Secretary
- James Callaghan – Shadow Home Secretary
- George Thomson – Shadow Secretary of State for Defence
- Anthony Crosland – Shadow Secretary of State for the Environment
- Tony Benn – Shadow Secretary of State for Industry and Technology
- Michael Foot – Shadow Minister for Fuel and Power
- Barbara Castle – Shadow Secretary of State for Employment
- Shirley Williams – Shadow Secretary of State for Health and Social Services
- Edward Short – Shadow Secretary of State for Education and Science
- Douglas Houghton – Chair of the Parliamentary Labour Party
- William Ross – Shadow Secretary of State for Scotland
- Harold Lever – Shadow Minister for Europe

=== Junior Shadow Ministers ===
- Cledwyn Hughes – Shadow Minister of Agriculture, Fisheries and Food
- Andrew Faulds - Shadow Minister for the Arts
- George Thomas – Shadow Secretary of State for Wales
- Roy Mason – Shadow President of the Board of Trade
- Elwyn Jones – Shadow Attorney General
- Samuel Silkin – Shadow Solicitor General for England and Wales
- Robert Sheldon – Shadow Paymaster General
- The Lord Shackleton PC – Leader of the Opposition in the House of Lords
- Bob Mellish – Opposition Chief Whip in the House of Commons
- Baron Beswick – Opposition Chief Whip in the House of Lords

=== Changes ===
==== December 1971 ====
- James Callaghan replaces Barbara Castle as Shadow Secretary of State for Employment
- Barbara Castle replaces Shirley Williams as Shadow Secretary of State for Health and Social Services
- Shirley Williams replaces James Callaghan as Shadow Secretary of State for the Home Department
- Michael Foot replaces Fred Peart as Shadow Leader of the House of Commons
- Fred Peart replaces Cledwyn Hughes as Shadow Minister for Agriculture, Fisheries and Food
- Peter Shore joins the shadow cabinet as Shadow Minister for Europe

==== April 1972 ====
- Roy Jenkins resigns as Deputy Leader and Shadow Chancellor
- George Thomson resigns as Shadow Defence Secretary and is replaced by Roy Hattersley
- Harold Lever resigns is replaced as Shadow Minister of Fuel and Power by Eric Varley
- Denis Healey replaces Roy Jenkins as Shadow Chancellor
- James Callaghan replaces Denis Healey as Shadow Foreign Secretary
- Reg Prentice joins the shadow cabinet, replacing James Callaghan as Shadow Employment Secretary
- Edward Short replaces Roy Jenkins as Deputy Leader of the Opposition

==== December 1972 ====
- Edward Short becomes Shadow Leader of the House of Commons
- Roy Hattersley replaces Edward Short as Shadow Education Secretary
- Fred Peart replaces Roy Hattersley as Shadow Defence Secretary
- Norman Buchan replaces Fred Peart as Shadow Minister for Agriculture, Fisheries and Food
- Michael Foot replaces Peter Shore as Shadow Europe Minister
- Peter Shore becomes Shadow Chancellor of the Duchy of Lancaster
- Harold Lever takes responsibility for shadowing the Trade and Industry affairs dealing with company law, mergers, competition and insurance
- Merlyn Rees joins the shadow cabinet with a newly created post: Shadow Secretary of State for Northern Ireland
- Barbara Castle is replaced as Shadow Secretary of State for Health and Social Services by John Silkin

==== November 1973 ====
- Roy Jenkins returns to the shadow cabinet, replacing Shirley Williams as Shadow Home Secretary
- Shirley Williams takes the newly created post of Shadow Secretary of State for Prices and Consumer Protection

== See also ==
- List of British shadow cabinets
- List of shadow holders of Great Offices of State
- Cabinet of the United Kingdom
- First Wilson Ministry
- Second Wilson Ministry
