= First Heath shadow cabinet =

First Shadow Cabinet of Edward Heath
- Shadow Cabinet of United Kingdom
- 1965 – 1970
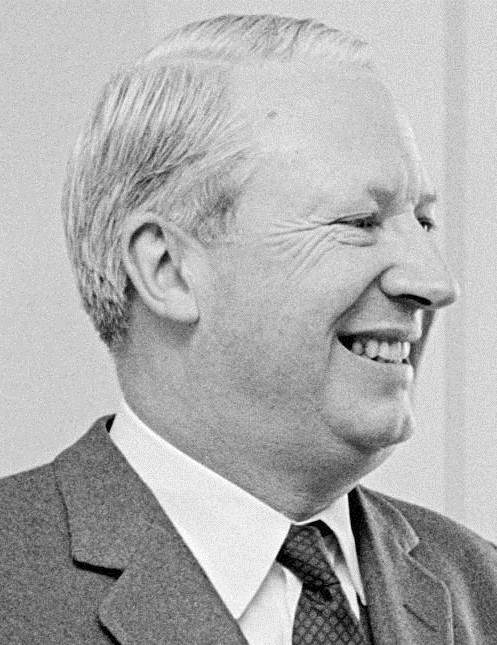
- Date formed: 28 July 1965
- Date dissolved: 19 June 1970

People and organisations
- Monarch: Elizabeth II
- Leader of the Opposition: Edward Heath
- Deputy Leader of the Opposition: Reginald Maudling
- Member party: Conservative Party
- Status in legislature: Official Opposition

History
- Incoming formation: 1965 Conservative Party leadership election
- Outgoing formation: 1970 United Kingdom general election
- Legislature terms: 43rd UK Parliament; 44th UK Parliament
- Predecessor: Douglas-Home shadow cabinet
- Successor: Second Wilson shadow cabinet

The First Shadow Cabinet of Edward Heath was created on 28 July 1965 after the Conservative Party elected Edward Heath as its leader, replacing Alec Douglas-Home.

== Shadow cabinet list ==
| Portfolio | Shadow Minister | Term |
|---|---|---|
| Leader of Her Majesty's Most Loyal Opposition; Leader of the Conservative Party | Edward Heath | 1965–70 |
| Deputy Leader of the Opposition; Deputy Leader of the Conservative Party | Reginald Maudling | 1965–70 |
| Shadow Secretary of State for External Affairs | Sir Alec Douglas-Home | 1965–66 |
| Shadow Chancellor of the Exchequer | Iain Macleod | 1965–70 |
| Shadow Foreign Secretary | Christopher Soames | 1965–66 |
| Shadow Foreign Secretary | Alec Douglas-Home | 1966–70 |
| Shadow Home Secretary | Peter Thorneycroft | 1965–66 |
| Shadow Home Secretary | Quintin Hogg | 1966–70 |
| Shadow Secretary of State for Defence | Enoch Powell | 1965–68 |
| Shadow Secretary of State for Defence | Reginald Maudling | 1968 |
| Shadow Secretary of State for Defence | Geoffrey Rippon | 1968–70 |
| Shadow Secretary of State for Trade and Steel; Shadow President of the Board of Trade | Anthony Barber | 1965–67 |
| Shadow Secretary of State for Trade and Steel; Shadow President of the Board of Trade | Keith Joseph | 1967–70 |
| Shadow Secretary of State for Education and Science | Edward Boyle | 1965–69 |
| Shadow Secretary of State for Education and Science | Margaret Thatcher | 1969–70 |
| Shadow Minister for Labour | Keith Joseph | 1965–67 |
| Shadow Minister for Labour | Robert Carr | 1967–70 |
| Shadow Minister for Social Services | Keith Joseph | 1965–66 |
| Shadow Minister for Social Services | Mervyn Pike | 1966–67 |
| Shadow Minister for Social Services | Robert Lindsay | 1967–70 |
| Shadow Minister for Technology | Ernest Marples | 1965–66 |
| Shadow Minister for Housing and Land | John Boyd-Carpenter | 1965–66 |
| Shadow Minister for Housing and Land | Geoffrey Rippon | 1966–68 |
| Shadow Minister for Housing and Land | Peter Walker | 1968–70 |
| Shadow Minister of Agriculture, Fisheries and Food | Joseph Godber | 1965–70 |
| Shadow Minister of Transport | Martin Redmayne | 1965–66 |
| Shadow Minister of Transport | Peter Walker | 1966–68 |
| Shadow Minister of Transport | Margaret Thatcher | 1968–69 |
| Shadow Minister of Transport | Peter Walker | 1969–70 |
| Shadow Commonwealth Secretary | Selwyn Lloyd | 1965–66 |
| Shadow Commonwealth Secretary | Reginald Maudling | 1966–68 |
| Shadow Commonwealth Secretary | Alec Douglas-Home | 1968 |
| Shadow Minister for Power | Anthony Barber | 1966–67 |
| Shadow Minister for Power | Keith Joseph | 1967 |
| Shadow Minister for Power | Margaret Thatcher | 1967–68 |
| Shadow Secretary of State for Scotland | Michael Noble | 1965–69 |
| Shadow Secretary of State for Scotland | Gordon Campbell | 1969–70 |
| Shadow Secretary of State for Wales | Peter Thorneycroft | 1965–66 |
| Shadow Secretary of State for Wales | Unknown | 1966–70 |
| Chairman of the Conservative Party | Edward du Cann | 1965–67 |
| Chairman of the Conservative Party | Anthony Barber | 1967–70 |
| Opposition Chief Whip | William Whitelaw | 1965–70 |
| Leader of the Opposition in the House of Lords | Lord Carington | 1965–70 |
| Deputy Leader of the Opposition in the House of Lords | Viscount Dilhorne | 1965–66 |
| Deputy Leader of the Opposition in the House of Lords | Baron Harlech | 1966–67 |
| Deputy Leader of the Opposition in the House of Lords | Earl Jellicoe | 1967–70 |
| Shadow Minister without Portfolio | Duncan Sandys | 1965–66 |
| Shadow Minister without Portfolio | Quintin Hogg | 1965–66 |
Other frontbenchers
| Shadow Minister for Power | John Peyton | 1965–66 |
| Shadow Minister for Power | Sir John Eden | 1968–70 |

== Initial Shadow Cabinet ==
Heath announced his Shadow Cabinet on 5 August 1965.

- Edward Heath – Leader of Her Majesty's Most Loyal Opposition and Leader of the Conservative Party
- Reginald Maudling – Deputy Leader of the Opposition, Deputy Leader of the Conservative Party and Shadow Leader of the House of Commons
- Alec Douglas-Home – Shadow Secretary of State for External Affairs
- Christopher Soames – Shadow Foreign Secretary
- Selwyn Lloyd – Shadow Secretary of State for Commonwealth Relations
- Enoch Powell – Shadow Secretary of State for Defence
- Iain Macleod – Shadow Chancellor of the Exchequer and Shadow Secretary of State for Economic Affairs
- Anthony Barber – Shadow President of the Board of Trade and Shadow Secretary of State for Steel
- Peter Thorneycroft – Shadow Home Secretary and Shadow Secretary of State for Wales
- Edward Boyle – Shadow Secretary of State for Education and Science
- Keith Joseph – Shadow Minister for Social Services and Shadow Minister for Labour
- Ernest Marples – Shadow Minister for Technology
- John Boyd-Carpenter – Shadow Minister for Housing and Land
- Joseph Godber – Shadow Minister of Agriculture, Fisheries and Food
- Martin Redmayne – Shadow Minister of Transport
- Michael Noble – Shadow Secretary of State for Scotland
- Edward du Cann – Chairman of the Conservative Party
- Lord Carington – Leader of the Opposition in the House of Lords
- Viscount Dilhorne – Deputy Leader of the Opposition in the House of Lords
- Duncan Sandys and Quintin Hogg – Shadow Minister without Portfolio

=== Junior Shadow Ministers ===
In October 1965 Heath announced the rest of his frontbench team.

- William Whitelaw – Opposition Chief Whip in the House of Commons
- Earl St Aldwyn – Opposition Chief Whip in the House of Lords

==== Agriculture, Fisheries and Food ====
- James Scott-Hopkins – Shadow Parliamentary Secretary to the Ministry of Agriculture, Fisheries and Food

==== Aviation ====
- Robert Carr – Shadow Minister of Aviation
- Keith Stainton – Shadow Parliamentary Secretary for Aviation

==== Broadcasting and Post Office ====
- Paul Bryan – Shadow Postmaster General
- David Gibson-Watt – Shadow Assistant Postmaster-General

==== Defence ====
- Tufton Beamish, Ronald Bell, John Eden, Nicholas Ridley – Shadow Ministers for Defence

==== Education and Science ====
- John Hill and David Price – Shadow Ministers for Education and Science

==== External Affairs ====
- Angus Maude – Shadow Minister for the Colonies
- Nigel Fisher – Shadow Minister for the Commonwealth
- Robert Lindsay and Priscilla Buchan – Shadow Minister for Foreign Affairs
- Christopher Chataway – Shadow Minister for Overseas Development

==== Home Office ====
- Richard Sharples – Shadow Minister for Home Affairs
- Philip Goodhart – Shadow Minister for the Home Department

==== Housing and Land ====
- John Hay, Graham Page and Margaret Thatcher – Shadow Ministers for Housing and Land

==== Law ====
- John Hobson – Shadow Attorney General for England and Wales
- Peter Thomas – Shadow Solicitor General for England and Wales
- Norman Wylie – Shadow Solicitor General for Scotland

==== Labour and Social Services ====
- Richard Wood – Shadow Minister of Health
- Charles Longbottom – Shadow Minister of Pensions and National Insurance
- Geoffrey Howe – Shadow Minister for Social Services
- Arthur Tiley and William van Straubenzee– Shadow Minister for Labour

==== Power ====
- John Peyton – Shadow Minister for Power
- Patrick McNair-Wilson – Shadow Parliamentary Secretary to the Ministry of Power

==== Public Building and Works ====
- Robin Chichester-Clark (UUP) – Shadow Minister of Public Building and Works
- Paul Channon – Shadow Parliamentary Secretary to the Ministry of Works

==== Scotland ====
- Anthony Stodart – Shadow Minister for Scotland
- Gordon Campbell and Ian MacArthur – Shadow Ministers for Scotland

==== Technology ====
- John Biffen – Shadow Minister of State for Technology

==== Transpory ====
- David Webster – Shadow Parliamentary Secretary to the Ministry of Transport

==== Treasury, Economic Affairs and Trade ====
- Peter Walker – Shadow Chief Secretary to the Treasury
- Patrick Jenkin – Shadow Financial Secretary to the Treasury
- William Clark and Peter Emery – Shadow Ministers for Trade

== April 1966 reshuffle ==
Following the 1966 election Heath was forced to reshuffle his frontbench as three members of the Shadow Cabinet (Soames, Thorneycroft and Redmayne) had lost their seats.

- Edward Heath – Leader of Her Majesty's Most Loyal Opposition and Leader of the Conservative Party
- Reginald Maudling – Deputy Leader of the Opposition, Deputy Leader of the Conservative Party, Shadow Secretary of State for Commonwealth Relations, Shadow Secretary of State for the Colonies and Shadow Minister for Overseas Development
- Alec Douglas-Home – Shadow Foreign Secretary
- Iain Macleod – Shadow Chancellor of the Exchequer and Shadow Secretary of State for Economic Affairs
- Quintin Hogg – Shadow Home Secretary
- Enoch Powell – Shadow Secretary of State for Defence
- Edward Boyle – Shadow Secretary of State for Education and Science
- Keith Joseph – Shadow Minister for Labour
- Joseph Godber – Shadow Minister of Agriculture, Fisheries and Food
- Anthony Barber – Shadow President of the Board of Trade and Shadow Minister for Power
- Geoffrey Rippon – Shadow Minister for Housing and Land
- Michael Noble – Shadow Secretary of State for Scotland
- Mervyn Pike – Shadow Minister for Social Services
- Peter Walker – Shadow Minister of Transport
- Edward du Cann – Chairman of the Conservative Party
- Lord Carington – Leader of the Opposition in the House of Lords
- Lord Harlech – Deputy Leader of the Opposition in the House of Lords

=== Junior Shadow Ministers ===
- William Whitelaw – Opposition Chief Whip in the House of Commons
- Earl St Aldwyn – Opposition Chief Whip in the House of Lords
- John Hobson – Shadow Attorney General for England and Wales
- Robert Carr – Shadow Minister of Aviation
- Margaret Thatcher – Shadow Chief Secretary to the Treasury
- Richard Wood – Shadow Minister for the Colonies
- Robert Lindsay – Shadow Minister for Foreign Affairs
- Paul Bryan – Shadow Postmaster General
- Robin Chichester-Clark (UUP) – Shadow Minister of Public Building and Works
- Norman Wylie – Shadow Solicitor General for Scotland
- George Younger – Shadow Minister for Scotland
- David Price – Shadow Minister for Technology
- Frederick Corfield – Shadow Minister for Trade and Power
- David Gibson-Watt – Shadow Secretary of State for Wales

Changes

- 22 February 1967 - Anthony Barber become a Shadow Minister without Portfolio, Keith Joseph replaces hime at Trade and Industry with Robert Carr joining the shadow cabinet as Shadow Minister for Labour as well as Aviation.
- 27 June 1967 - Lord Harlech resigns as Deputy Leader in the Lords and is replaced by Earl Jellicoe.
- 11 September 1967 - Edward du Cann resigns as party chairman and is replaced by Barber.
- 10 October 1967 - Mervyn Pike resigns and is replaced by Robert Lindsay. Margaret Thatcher enters the shadow cabinet as Shadow Minister for Power. Patrick Jenkin replaces Thatcher at the Treasury.
- 21 April 1968 - Enoch Powell is sacked from the shadow cabinet after his racist Rivers of Blood speech the day before. Maudling becomes Shadow Defence Secretary and Douglas-Home Shadow Commonwealth Secretary

== November 1968 reshuffle ==
Another reshuffle was conducted in November 1968.

- Edward Heath – Leader of Her Majesty's Most Loyal Opposition and Leader of the Conservative Party
- Reginald Maudling – Deputy Leader of the Opposition, Deputy Leader of the Conservative Party and Shadow Minister with responsibility for policy formation
- Alec Douglas-Home – Shadow Foreign Secretary
- Iain Macleod – Shadow Chancellor of the Exchequer and Shadow Secretary of State for Economic Affairs
- Quintin Hogg – Shadow Home Secretary
- Geoffrey Rippon – Shadow Secretary of State for Defence
- Edward Boyle – Shadow Secretary of State for Education and Science
- Keith Joseph – Shadow President of the Board of Trade
- Robert Carr – Shadow Minister for Labour
- Joseph Godber – Shadow Minister of Agriculture, Fisheries and Food
- Peter Walker – Shadow Minister for Housing and Land
- Michael Noble – Shadow Secretary of State for Scotland
- Robert Lindsay – Shadow Secretary of State for Social Services
- Margaret Thatcher – Shadow Minister of Transport
- Anthony Barber – Chairman of the Conservative Party
- Lord Carington – Leader of the Opposition in the House of Lords
- Earl Jellicoe – Deputy Leader of the Opposition in the House of Lords

=== Junior Shadow Ministers ===
- William Whitelaw – Opposition Chief Whip in the House of Commons
- Earl St Aldwyn – Opposition Chief Whip in the House of Lords
- Paul Channon - Shadow Minister for the Arts
- Peter Rawlinson – Shadow Attorney General for England and Wales
- Frederick Corfield – Shadow Minister of Aviation
- Patrick Jenkin – Shadow Chief Secretary to the Treasury
- Bernard Braine – Shadow Minister for the Colonies
- James Ramsden – Shadow Minister for Defence
- Richard Wood – Shadow Minister for Foreign Affairs
- Maurice Macmillan – Shadow Minister of Health
- Graham Page – Shadow Minister for Housing and Land
- Paul Bryan – Shadow Postmaster General
- Robin Chichester-Clark (UUP) – Shadow Minister of Public Building and Works
- John Eden – Shadow Minister for Power
- Norman Wylie – Shadow Solicitor General for Scotland
- George Younger – Shadow Minister for Scotland
- Charles Morrison - Shadow Minister for Sport
- David Price – Shadow Minister for Technology
- Terence Higgins – Shadow Minister for Trade
- David Gibson-Watt – Shadow Secretary of State for Wales

Changes

- 15 October 1969 – Edward Boyle resigns as Shadow Education Secretary.
- 21 October 1969 – Thatcher replaces Boyle at Education. Keith Joseph takes Technology and Power, Walker adds Transport to Housing and Local Government.
