= Douglas-Home shadow cabinet =

Conservative Shadow Cabinet of 1964 in British Politics

Douglas-Home Shadow Cabinet
- Shadow Cabinet of United Kingdom
- 1964 – 1965
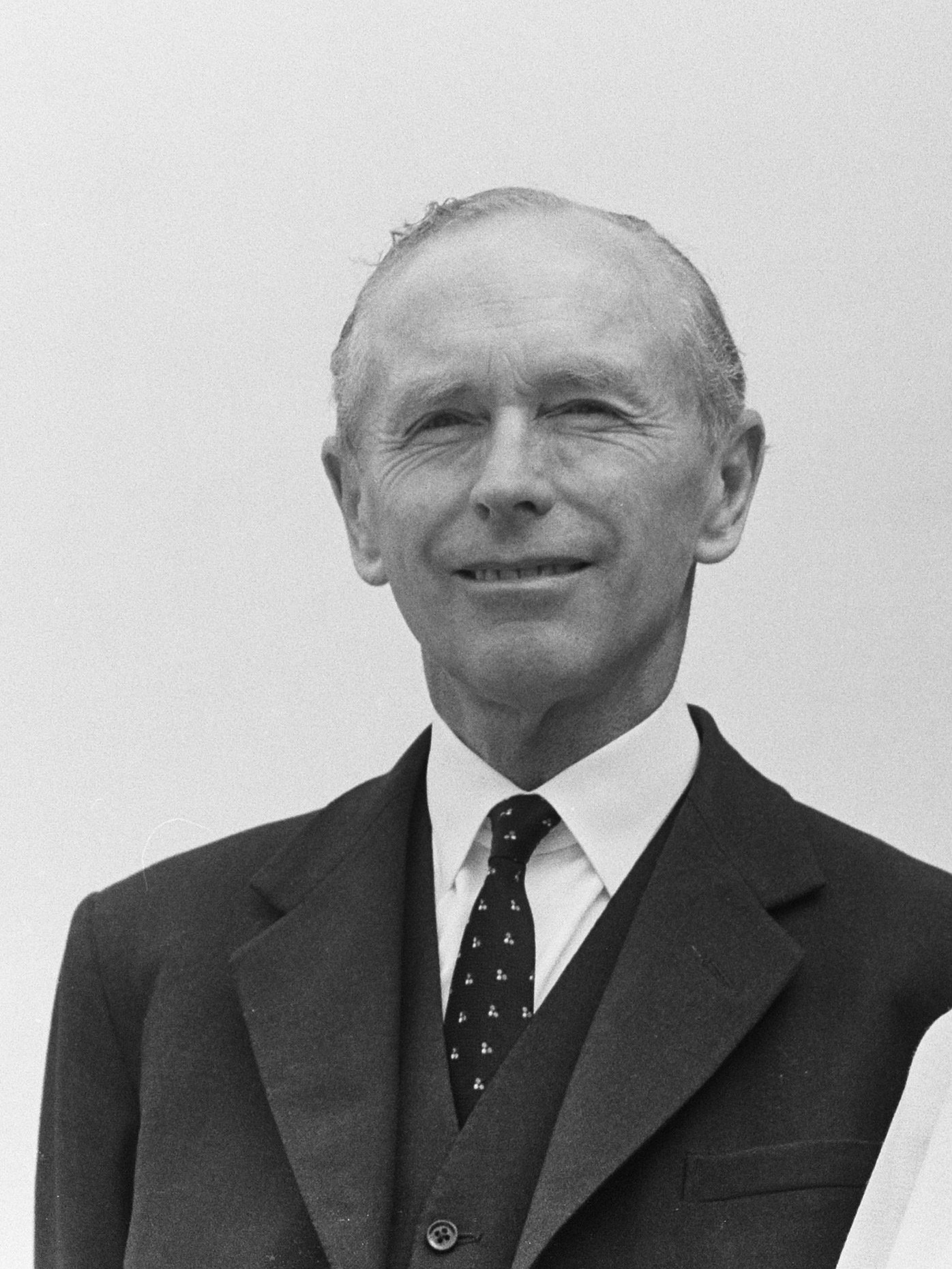
- Date formed: 16 October 1964
- Date dissolved: 28 July 1965

People and organisations
- Monarch: Elizabeth II
- Leader of the Opposition: Alec Douglas-Home
- Member party: Conservative Party
- Status in legislature: Official Opposition

History
- Legislature terms: 43th UK Parliament
- Outgoing formation: 1965 Conservative Party leadership election
- Predecessor: First Wilson shadow cabinet
- Successor: First Heath shadow cabinet

The Shadow Cabinet of Alec Douglas-Home was created on 16 October 1964 following the defeat in the 1964 general election.

== Shadow cabinet list ==
Portfolio	Shadow Minister	Term
Leader of Her Majesty's Most Loyal Opposition; Leader of the Conservative Party	Alec Douglas-Home	1964–65
Shadow Chancellor of the Exchequer	Reginald Maudling	1964–65
Shadow Chancellor of the Exchequer	Edward Heath	1965
Shadow Secretary of State for Economic Affairs	Edward Heath	1964–65
Shadow Foreign Secretary	R. A. Butler	1964–65
Shadow Foreign Secretary	Reginald Maudling	1965
Shadow Home Secretary	Edward Boyle	1964–65
Shadow Home Secretary	Peter Thorneycroft	1965
Shadow Secretary of State for Defence	Peter Thorneycroft	1964–65
Shadow Secretary of State for Defence	Christopher Soames	1965
Shadow Leader of the House of Commons	Selwyn Lloyd	1964–65
Shadow Commonwealth Secretary; Shadow Secretary of State for the Colonies	Duncan Sandys	1964–65
Shadow Secretary of State for Trade; Shadow President of the Board of Trade	Anthony Barber	1965
Shadow Secretary of State for Education and Science	Quintin Hogg	1964–65
Shadow Secretary of State for Education and Science	Edward Boyle	1965
Shadow Minister of Agriculture, Fisheries and Food	Christopher Soames	1964–65
Shadow Minister of Agriculture, Fisheries and Food	Martin Redmayne	1965
Shadow Minister for Labour	Joseph Godber	1964–65
Shadow Secretary of State for Scotland	Michael Noble	1964–65
Shadow Minister for Social Services; Shadow Secretary of State for Wales	Keith Joseph	1964–65
Shadow Minister for Technology	Ernest Marples	1964–65
Shadow Minister for Housing and Land	John Boyd-Carpenter	1964–65
Shadow Minister for Steel	Iain Macleod	1964–65
Shadow Minister of Transport	Enoch Powell	1964–65
Chairman of the Conservative Party	Viscount Blakenham	1964–65
Chairman of the Conservative Party	Edward du Cann	1965
Leader of the Opposition in the House of Lords	The Lord Carrington PC	1964–65
Deputy Leader of the Opposition in the House of Lords	Viscount Dilhorne	1964–65
Opposition Chief Whip	Martin Redmayne	1964
Opposition Chief Whip	William Whitelaw	1964–65
Shadow Minister without Portfolio	Quintin Hogg	1965
Other frontbenchers
Shadow Minister for Trade	Edward du Cann	1964–65
Shadow Minister of Health	Richard Wood	1964–65
Shadow Minister for Pensions	Margaret Thatcher	1964–65
Shadow Minister for Power	John Peyton	1964–65
Shadow Minister for Aviation	Angus Maude	1964–65
Shadow Minister of Public Buildings and Works	John Ramsden	1964–65
Shadow Minister for Land and Natural Resources	Frederick Corfield	1964–65
Shadow Minister on Broadcasting and Post Office Affairs	Mervyn Pike	1964
Shadow Minister on Broadcasting and Post Office Affairs	Martin Redmayne	1964–65
Shadow Minister on Broadcasting and Post Office Affairs	David Gibson-Watt	1965
Shadow Attorney General for England and Wales	John Hobson	1964–65
Shadow Solicitor General for England and Wales	Peter Rawlinson	1964–65
Shadow Minister for the Colonies	Julian Amery	1964–65
Shadow Minister for Overseas Development	Robert Carr	1964–65
Opposition Deputy Chief Whip	William Whitelaw	1964

== See also ==
- List of British governments
- Official Opposition of the United Kingdom
