= Shadow Secretary of State for Wales =

Member of the UK Shadow Cabinet

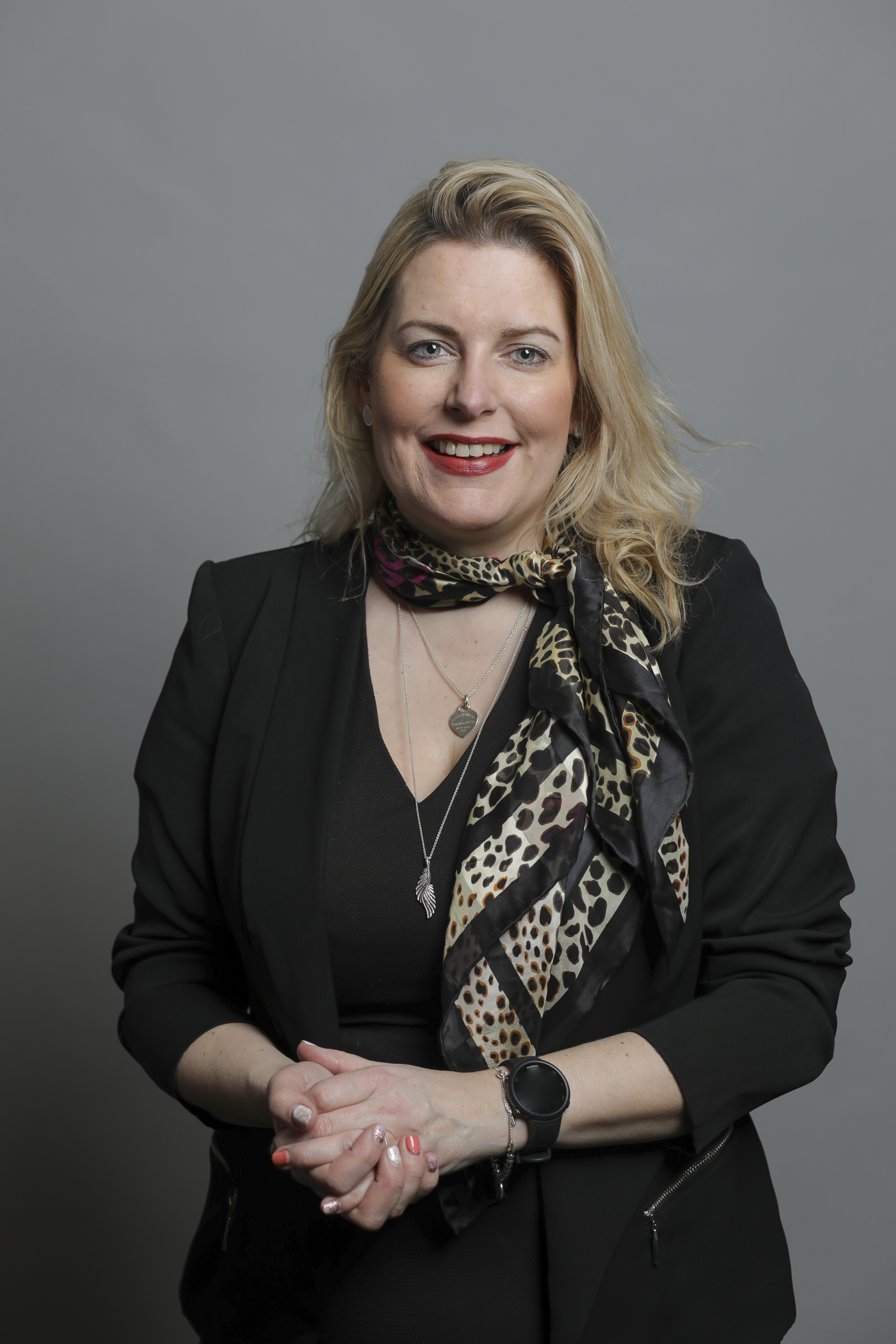
- Incumbent; Mims Davies since 5 November 2024
- Member of: Official Opposition Shadow Cabinet
- Appointer: Leader of the Opposition

The shadow secretary of state for Wales (or shadow Welsh secretary) is a member of the UK Shadow Cabinet responsible for the scrutiny of the secretary of state for Wales and their department, the Wales Office. The incumbent holder of the office is Mims Davies.

== List of shadow secretaries ==
=== Frontbench spokesmen for Wales ===
Name	Entered office	Left office	Political party	Shadow Cabinet
Jim Griffiths	November 1959	16 October 1964	Labour	Gaitskell
Jim Griffiths	November 1959	16 October 1964	Labour	Brown
Jim Griffiths	November 1959	16 October 1964	Labour	Wilson
=== Shadow Secretary of State for Wales ===
Name	Entered office	Left office	Political party	Shadow Cabinet
Keith Joseph	29 October 1964	5 August 1965	Conservative	Douglas-Home
Peter Thorneycroft	5 August 1965	6 October 1965	Conservative	Heath
David Gibson-Watt	6 October 1965	19 June 1970	Conservative	Heath
George Thomas	19 June 1970	4 March 1974	Labour	Wilson II
Peter Thomas	4 March 1974	18 February 1975	Conservative	Heath II
Nicholas Edwards; MP for Pembrokeshire	18 February 1975	4 May 1979	Conservative	Thatcher
John Morris; MP for Aberavon	4 May 1979	14 June 1979	Labour	Callaghan
Alec Jones; MP for Rhondda	14 June 1979	20 March 1983	Labour	Callaghan
Alec Jones; MP for Rhondda	14 June 1979	20 March 1983	Labour	Foot
Denzil Davies; MP for Llanelli	20 March 1983	31 October 1983	Labour	Foot
Barry Jones; MP for Alyn and Deeside	31 October 1983	13 July 1987	Labour	Kinnock
Alan Williams; MP for Swansea West	13 July 1987	9 January 1989	Labour	Kinnock
Barry Jones; MP for Alyn and Deeside	9 January 1989	24 July 1992	Labour	Kinnock
Ann Clwyd; MP for Cynon Valley	24 July 1992	21 October 1993	Labour	Smith
Ron Davies; MP for Caerphilly	21 October 1993	2 May 1997	Labour	Smith
Ron Davies; MP for Caerphilly	21 October 1993	2 May 1997	Labour	Beckett
Ron Davies; MP for Caerphilly	21 October 1993	2 May 1997	Labour	Blair
William Hague; MP for Richmond	2 May 1997	19 June 1997	Conservative	Major
Michael Ancram; MP for Devizes; As Constitutional Affairs spokesperson	19 June 1997	1 June 1998	Conservative	Hague
Liam Fox; MP for Woodspring; As Constitutional Affairs spokesperson	1 June 1998	15 June 1999	Conservative	Hague
Sir George Young; MP for North West Hampshire; As Constitutional Affairs spokesperson	15 June 1999	26 September 2000	Conservative	Hague
Angela Browning; MP for Tiverton and Honiton; As Constitutional Affairs spokesperson	26 September 2000	18 September 2001	Conservative	Hague
Nigel Evans; MP for Ribble Valley	18 September 2001	11 November 2003	Conservative	Duncan Smith
Bill Wiggin; MP for Leominster	11 November 2003	6 December 2005	Conservative	Howard
Cheryl Gillan; MP for Chesham and Amersham	6 December 2005	11 May 2010	Conservative	Cameron
Peter Hain; MP for Neath	11 May 2010	15 May 2012	Labour	Harman
Peter Hain; MP for Neath	11 May 2010	15 May 2012	Labour	Miliband
Owen Smith; MP for Pontypridd	15 May 2012	14 September 2015	Labour	Miliband
Owen Smith; MP for Pontypridd	15 May 2012	14 September 2015	Labour	Harman II
Nia Griffith; MP for Llanelli	14 September 2015	27 June 2016	Labour	Corbyn
Paul Flynn; MP for Newport West	3 July 2016	6 October 2016	Labour	Corbyn
Jo Stevens; MP for Cardiff Central	6 October 2016	27 January 2017	Labour	Corbyn
Christina Rees; MP for Neath	9 February 2017	6 April 2020	Labour	Corbyn
Nia Griffith; MP for Llanelli	6 April 2020	29 November 2021	Labour	Starmer
Jo Stevens; MP for Cardiff Central	29 November 2021	5 July 2024	Labour	Starmer
Byron Davies; Baron Davies of Gower	8 July 2024	5 November 2024	Conservative	Sunak
Mims Davies; MP for East Grinstead and Uckfield	5 November 2024	Incumbent	Conservative	Badenoch
