= 1951 Labour Party Shadow Cabinet election =

UK political party election

Elections to the Labour Party's Shadow Cabinet (more formally, its "Parliamentary Committee") occurred in November 1951. In addition to the 12 members elected, the Leader (Clement Attlee), Deputy Leader (Herbert Morrison), Labour Chief Whip (William Whiteley), and Labour Leader in the House of Lords (Christopher Addison) were automatically members.

Uniquely, in 1951, the voting tallies were not released, only the ranks of the successful candidates.

The results of the election are listed below:

Colour key	Member of Cabinet when Labour Party lost office following the 1951 election

Rank	Candidate	Constituency	Votes
1	Jim Griffiths	Llanelli	
2	Glenvil Hall	Colne Valley	
3	Hugh Gaitskell	Leeds South	
4	Alfred Robens	Blyth	
5	James Chuter Ede	South Shields	
6	Richard Stokes	Ipswich	
7	James Callaghan	Cardiff South-East	
8	Hugh Dalton	Bishop Auckland	
9	Philip Noel-Baker	Derby South	
10	Edith Summerskill	Fulham West	
11	Manny Shinwell	Easington	
12	Tony Greenwood	Wakefield	
