= His Majesty's Most Loyal Opposition =

Parliamentary political opposition to the government of the United Kingdom

His Majesty's Most Loyal Opposition (called Her Majesty's Most Loyal Opposition when a queen reigns), often abbreviated to HM Most Loyal Opposition, commonly known as the Official Opposition, and colloquially The Opposition, is the main official political opposition in the United Kingdom to His Majesty's Government. This is usually the largest political party in the House of Commons that does not form part of the government or a governing coalition.

Since July 2024, the Official Opposition has been the Conservative Party, with outgoing prime minister Rishi Sunak serving as Leader of the Opposition until the Conservative Party leadership election in November 2024 when newly elected party leader Kemi Badenoch took over the position.

== Origins ==
The phrase His Majesty's Opposition was coined in 1826, before the advent of the modern two-party system, when Parliament consisted more of interests, relationships and factions rather than the highly coherent political parties of today (although the Whigs and Tories were the two main parties). The phrase was originally coined in jest; in attacking Foreign Secretary George Canning in the House of Commons, John Hobhouse said jokingly, "It is said to be hard on His Majesty's Ministers to raise objections of this character but it is more hard on His Majesty's Opposition to compel them to take this course."

== Opposition days ==
A typical session of the House of Commons usually has roughly 150 sitting days per year. Whilst most of these days in the House of Commons are set aside for government business, twenty days (~13%) in each session are set aside for opposition debates. Of these days, seventeen are at the disposal of the leader of the opposition and three (2%) can be used by the leader of the smaller, or tertiary, opposition party. This has been the Liberal Democrats since the 2024 General Election.

Although the Opposition has no more formal powers in setting the Parliamentary agenda, in reality they have a certain influence through a process known as the usual channels.

== Leader of the Opposition ==
The leader of His Majesty's Most Loyal Opposition is often seen as the prime minister-in-waiting. The leader of the opposition receives a statutory salary and perquisites like those of a cabinet minister, including appointment as a privy counsellor. Since 1915, the leader of the opposition has, like the prime minister, always been a member of the House of Commons. Before that a member of the House of Lords sometimes took on the role, although often there was no overall leader of the opposition.

Although there has never been a dispute as to who holds the position, under the Ministerial and other Salaries Act 1975, the speaker's decision on the identity of the leader of the opposition is final.

As of 2 November 2024, the current leader of the opposition is Kemi Badenoch who is also leader of the Conservative Party. She replaced Rishi Sunak after winning the 2024 Conservative Party leadership election.

== Ministers' Questions ==
=== Prime Minister's Questions ===
The most public parliamentary function of the leader of the opposition is Prime Minister's Questions (PMQs), currently a 30-minute session held on Wednesday at noon when Parliament is sitting. The leader of the opposition has six questions, which they sometimes split into two sets. Backbench opposition MPs and frontbench opposition MPs that are not in the Shadow Cabinet also have the right to question the Prime Minister; they are selected either through a ballot, or by "catching the Speaker's eye". By convention, other Shadow Cabinet members do not question the prime minister at PMQs, except when standing in for the Leader.

=== Questions to other ministers ===
Every government department is subjected to questions in the House of Commons and the House of Lords. As with PMQs, the official opposition spokespersons are allocated a number of questions, and in addition backbench MPs are free to ask questions. In the House of Lords, opposition spokespersons also question the government. This is one of the reasons why every government department has at least one Member of Parliament and one peer in it.

== Seating ==
As is usual with Westminster systems, and other statutory assemblies and councils in the UK, the government and its supporters sit to the Speaker's right, whilst the opposition parties sit to their left. Currently, members from the Labour Party, and SDLP sit to the Speaker's right, and members from the Conservative Party sit on the main left bench, which is where the main opposition party sits. The second main opposition bench is where the third largest party sits, in this case the Liberal Democrats. The back of this bench is where other minor parties sit, such as the Scottish National Party, Reform UK, the Green Party, the DUP, Plaid Cymru, the Alliance Party, the TUV, the UUP, and the Independents.

== See also ==
- Leader of the Opposition (United Kingdom)
- List of British shadow cabinets
- Official Opposition frontbench
- Official Opposition Shadow Cabinet (United Kingdom)
- Parliamentary opposition
- Frontbench Team of Ed Davey
- Frontbench Team of Stephen Flynn
