= Shadow Minister for Development =

Shadow Cabinet office

Shadow Minister for International Development
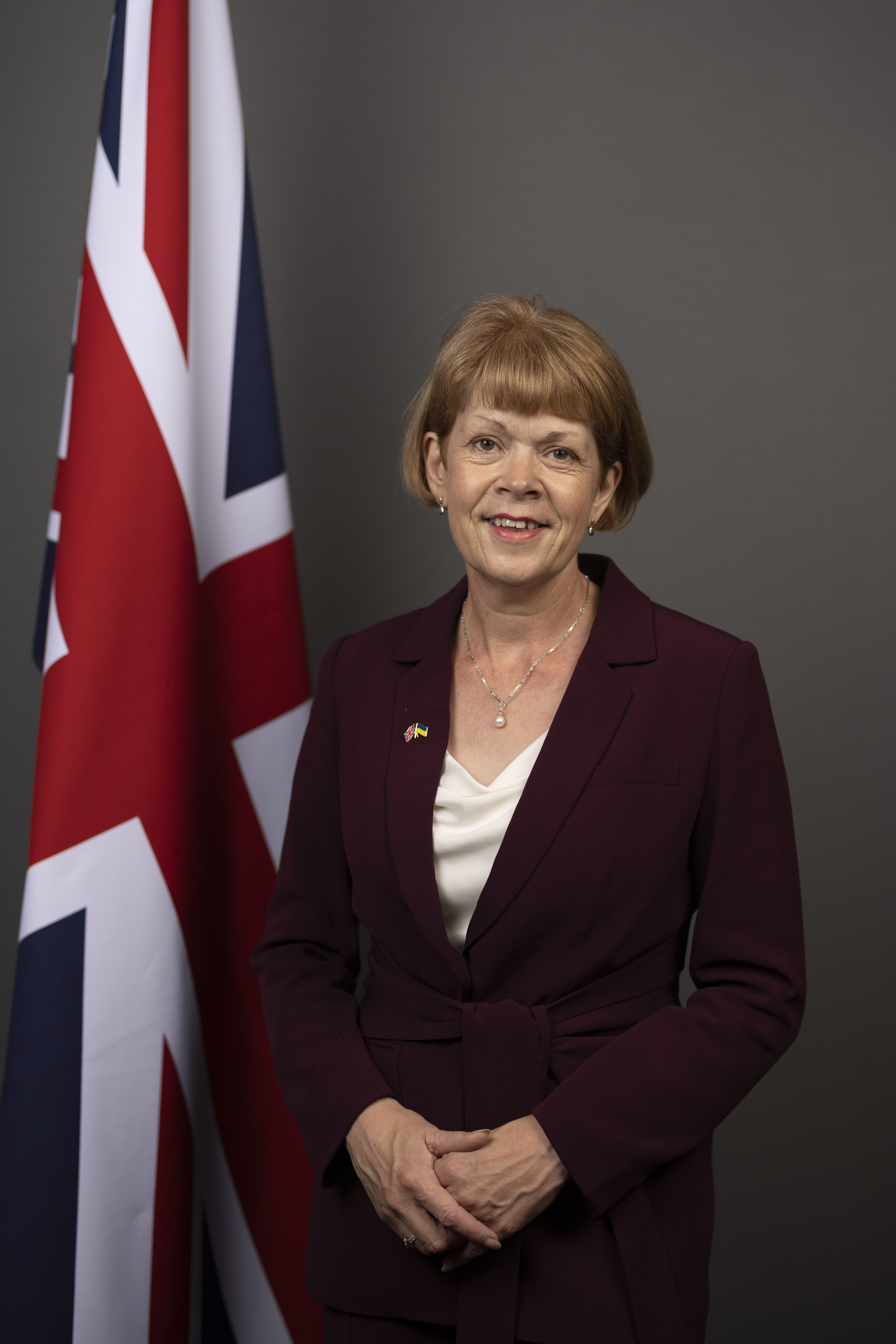
- Incumbent; Wendy Morton since 6 November 2024
- Appointer: Leader of the Opposition
- Website: The Shadow Cabinet

The shadow minister for international development is the lead spokesperson for the United Kingdom's Official Opposition on issues related to international aid, most notably to the Third World. The shadow cabinet minister holds the minister of state for development and Africa to account in Parliament. The role previously had no counterpart in the Government between 2020 and 2022 after the Department for International Development (DFID) and the role of international development secretary was abolished by the second Johnson government in 2020. The position was renamed from shadow secretary of state for international development in November 2021 and placed under the shadow foreign secretary.

The shadow minister also holds the foreign secretary and other FCDO ministers to account in Parliament. DFID was abolished in 2020 but Keir Starmer retained the role in his Shadow Cabinet.

Before Tony Blair established DfID in his first government after coming to power in 1997, there was a minister for overseas development ("minister of" before 1970) who was a part of the Foreign and Commonwealth Office. Since 1989, the shadow minister or shadow secretary has usually been a member of the shadow cabinet.

== Shadow ministers and secretaries ==
=== Shadow Minister for Overseas Development ===
Name	Took office	Left office	Political party	Leader
Robert Carr	October 1964	October 1965	Conservative	Alec Douglas-Home
Christopher Chataway	October 1965	31 March 1966	Conservative	Edward Heath
Richard Wood	April 1966	c. October 1967	Conservative	Edward Heath
Bernard Braine	c. October 1967	15 June 1970	Conservative	Edward Heath
Judith Hart	19 June 1970	4 March 1974	Labour	Harold Wilson
Richard Wood	4 March 1974	18 February 1975	Conservative	Edward Heath
Unclear; possibly none (Note: Richard Wood replied for the Opposition in a debate on 24 February, six days after Margaret Thatcher named her Shadow Cabinet. Various other Conservatives, including the Reginald Maudling (as Shadow Foreign Secretary), Peter Tapsell, and John Davies (as Shadow Foreign Secretary) replied in debates on overseas development thereafter.)	18 February 1975	15 January 1976	Conservative	Margaret Thatcher
Richard Luce	15 January 1976	4 May 1979	Conservative	Margaret Thatcher
Judith Hart	4 May 1979	8 December 1980	Labour	James Callaghan
Frank McElhone	8 December 1980	22 September 1982	Labour	Michael Foot
Guy Barnett	24 November 1982	31 October 1983	Labour	Michael Foot
Stuart Holland	31 October 1983	13 July 1987	Labour	Neil Kinnock
Unclear	13 July 1987	2 November 1989	Labour	Neil Kinnock
Ann Clwyd	2 November 1989	18 July 1992	Labour	Neil Kinnock
Michael Meacher	18 July 1992	21 October 1993	Labour	John Smith
Tom Clarke	21 October 1993	20 October 1994	Labour	John Smith
Tom Clarke	21 October 1993	20 October 1994	Labour	Margaret Beckett
Joan Lestor	20 October 1994	October 1996	Labour	Tony Blair
Clare Short	25 July 1996	2 May 1997	Labour	Tony Blair
=== Shadow Secretary of State for International Development ===
Name	Took office	Left office	Political party	Leader
The Baroness Chalker of Wallasey (Note: John Major's interim Shadow Cabinet consisted of those members of his Cabinet who retained their seats at the 1997 general election, but there had been no International Development Secretary, and the Overseas Development Minister was not in Cabinet. According to the Shadow Cabinet list, Major himself was responsible for Foreign Affairs (the department responsible for development in his government), but ministers could "call on the services of Members who served under them in Government". It is unknown whether Major called on the service of Baroness Chalker of Wallasey, the last Minister for Overseas Development, during the approximately two months before William Hague was elected leader. Therefore it is unclear whether the office was vacant or non-existent, or whether Major or Chalker should be considered to have held it.)	2 May 1997	30 June 1997	Conservative	John Major
Alastair Goodlad	30 June 1997	1 June 1998	Conservative	William Hague
Gary Streeter	1 June 1998	14 September 2001	Conservative	William Hague
Caroline Spelman	14 September 2001	10 November 2003	Conservative	Iain Duncan Smith
John Bercow	10 November 2003	8 September 2004	Conservative	Michael Howard
Alan Duncan	8 September 2004	10 May 2005	Conservative	Michael Howard
Andrew Mitchell	10 May 2005	11 May 2010	Conservative	Michael Howard
Douglas Alexander	11 May 2010 (Note: Under Labour Party rules, ministers shadow their former roles when the party enters opposition. Alexander was International Development Secretary when Gordon Brown resigned as Prime Minister.)	8 October 2010	Labour	Harriet Harman
Harriet Harman	8 October 2010	7 October 2011	Labour	Ed Miliband
Ivan Lewis	7 October 2011	7 October 2013	Labour	Ed Miliband
Jim Murphy	7 October 2013	2 November 2014	Labour	Ed Miliband
Mary Creagh	5 November 2014	12 September 2015	Labour	Ed Miliband
Mary Creagh	5 November 2014	12 September 2015	Labour	Harriet Harman
Diane Abbott	13 September 2015	27 June 2016	Labour	Jeremy Corbyn
Kate Osamor	27 June 2016	1 December 2018	Labour & Co-op	Jeremy Corbyn
Dan Carden	1 December 2018	6 April 2020	Labour	Jeremy Corbyn
Preet Kaur Gill	6 April 2020	29 November 2021	Labour & Co-op	Keir Starmer
=== Shadow Cabinet Minister for International Development ===
Name	Took office	Left office	Political party	Leader
Preet Gill	29 November 2021	4 September 2023	Labour & Co-op	Keir Starmer
Lisa Nandy	4 September 2023	5 July 2024	Labour	Keir Starmer
=== Shadow Minister for Development ===
Name	Took office	Left office	Political party	Leader
Harriett Baldwin	19 July 2024	5 November 2024	Conservative	Rishi Sunak
Wendy Morton	6 November 2024	incumbent	Conservative	Kemi Badenoch
