= Shadow Attorney General for England and Wales =

UK shadow cabinet position

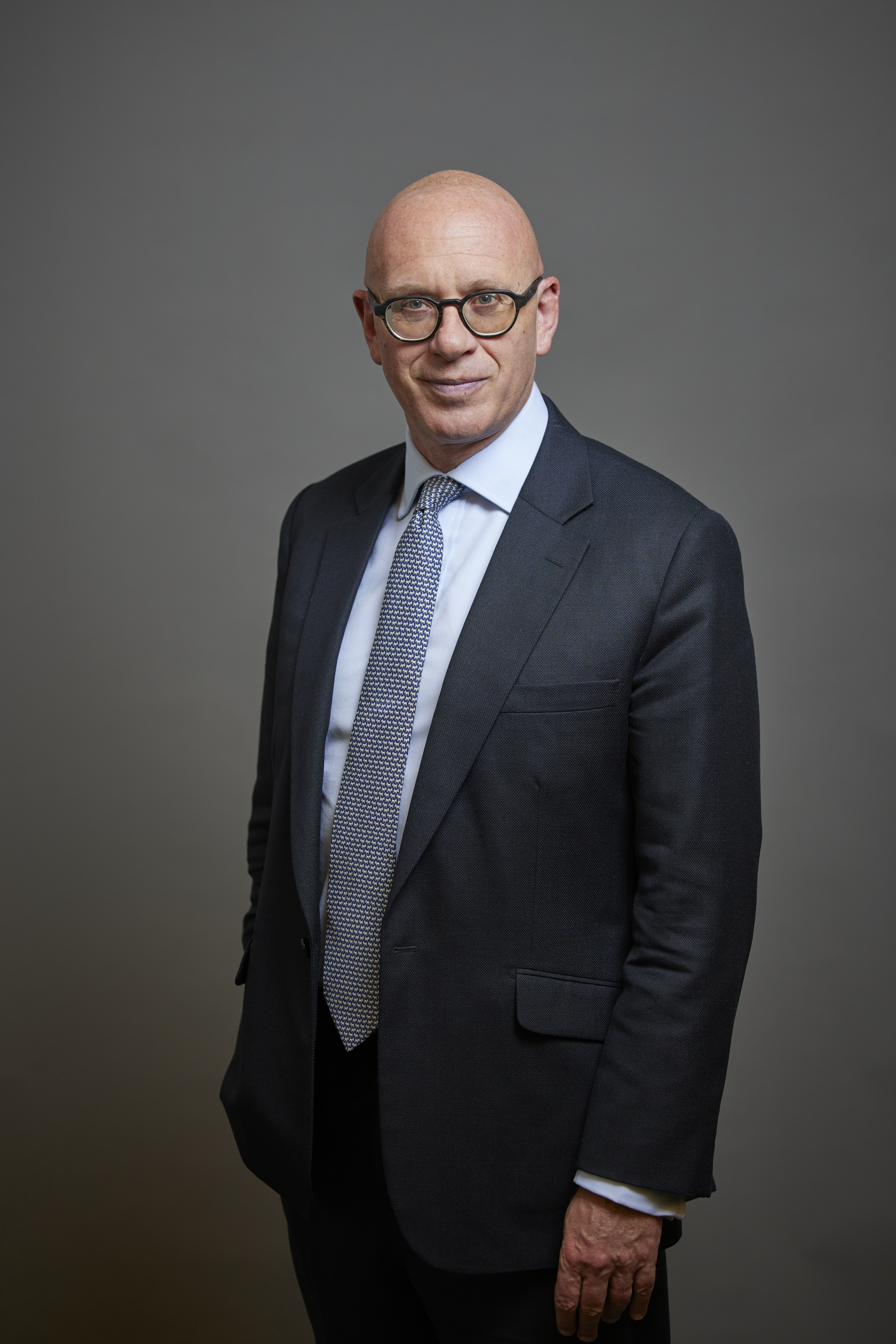
- Incumbent; David Wolfson, Baron Wolfson of Tredegar since 6 November 2024
- Member of: Official Opposition Shadow Cabinet
- Appointer: Leader of the Opposition
- Deputy: Shadow Solicitor General

The shadow attorney general for England and Wales is an office within British politics held by a member of His Majesty's Loyal Opposition. The duty of the office holder is to scrutinise the actions of the Attorney General for England and Wales and develop alternative policies. The shadow attorney general is not a member of the Shadow Cabinet, but attends its meetings.

The shadow attorney general is deputised by the shadow solicitor general.

== List of shadow attorneys general ==
Name	Entered office	Left office	Political party	Shadow Cabinet
Lynn Ungoed-Thomas	15 July 1955	27 November 1956	Labour	Attlee
Lynn Ungoed-Thomas	15 July 1955	27 November 1956	Labour	Gaitskell
Frank Soskice	27 November 1956	16 October 1964	Labour	Gaitskell
Frank Soskice	27 November 1956	16 October 1964	Labour	Brown
Frank Soskice	27 November 1956	16 October 1964	Labour	Wilson
John Hobson	16 October 1964	4 December 1967	Conservative	Douglas-Home
John Hobson	16 October 1964	4 December 1967	Conservative	Heath I
Peter Rawlinson	April 1968	19 June 1970	Conservative	Heath I
Elwyn Jones	19 June 1970	4 March 1974	Labour	Wilson II
Peter Rawlinson	4 March 1974	20 March 1974	Conservative	Heath II
Michael Havers	20 March 1974	4 May 1979	Conservative	Heath II
Michael Havers	20 March 1974	4 May 1979	Conservative	Thatcher
Samuel Silkin	4 May 1979	14 July 1979	Labour	Callaghan
John Morris	14 July 1979	24 November 1981	Labour	Callaghan
John Morris	14 July 1979	24 November 1981	Labour	Foot
Peter Archer	24 November 1981	24 November 1982	Labour	Foot
Arthur Davidson	24 November 1982	9 June 1983	Labour	Foot
John Morris	9 June 1983	2 May 1997	Labour	Foot
John Morris	9 June 1983	2 May 1997	Labour	Kinnock
John Morris	9 June 1983	2 May 1997	Labour	Smith
John Morris	9 June 1983	2 May 1997	Labour	Beckett
John Morris	9 June 1983	2 May 1997	Labour	Blair
Nicholas Lyell	2 May 1997	19 June 1997	Conservative	Major
Edward Garnier	19 June 1997	13 September 2001	Conservative	Hague
Bill Cash	14 September 2001	6 November 2003	Conservative	Duncan Smith
Dominic Grieve	6 November 2003	8 September 2009	Conservative	Howard
Dominic Grieve	6 November 2003	8 September 2009	Conservative	Cameron
Edward Garnier	8 September 2009	11 May 2010	Conservative	Cameron
Patricia Janet Scotland, Baroness Scotland of Asthal	11 May 2010	7 October 2011	Labour	Harman I
Patricia Janet Scotland, Baroness Scotland of Asthal	11 May 2010	7 October 2011	Labour	Miliband
Emily Thornberry	7 October 2011	3 December 2014	Labour	Miliband
Willy Bach, Baron Bach	3 December 2014	14 September 2015	Labour	Miliband
Willy Bach, Baron Bach	3 December 2014	14 September 2015	Labour	Harman II
Catherine McKinnell	14 September 2015	11 January 2016	Labour	Corbyn
Karl Turner	11 January 2016	26 June 2016	Labour	Corbyn
Vacant	26 June 2016	6 October 2016		Corbyn
Shami Chakrabarti, Baroness Chakrabarti	6 October 2016	6 April 2020	Labour	Corbyn
Charlie Falconer, Baron Falconer of Thoroton	6 April 2020	29 November 2021	Labour	Starmer
Emily Thornberry	29 November 2021	5 July 2024	Labour	Starmer
Jeremy Wright	8 July 2024	6 November 2024	Conservative	Sunak
David Wolfson, Baron Wolfson of Tredegar	6 November 2024	Incumbent	Conservative	Badenoch
