= Howard shadow cabinet =

UK shadow cabinet from 2003 to 2005

Howard Shadow Cabinet
- Shadow Cabinet of the United Kingdom
- 2003 – 2005
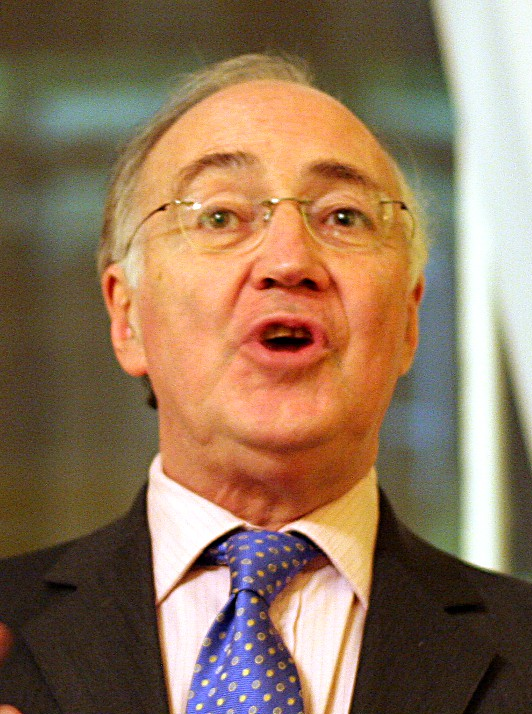
- Date formed: 6 November 2003
- Date dissolved: 6 December 2005

People and organisations
- Monarch: Elizabeth II
- Leader of the Opposition: Michael Howard
- Deputy Leader of the Opposition: Michael Ancram
- Member party: Conservative Party
- Status in legislature: Official Opposition

History
- Election: 2003 Conservative leadership election
- Outgoing election: 2005 general election
- Legislature terms: 53rd UK Parliament; 54th UK Parliament
- Predecessor: Duncan Smith shadow cabinet
- Successor: Cameron shadow cabinet

The Shadow Cabinets appointed by Michael Howard, a Conservative, are listed below.

== Shadow Cabinet (11 November 2003 – 15 March 2004) ==
- Rt. Hon. Michael Howard QC MP – Leader of Her Majesty's Loyal Opposition and Leader of the Conservative Party
- Rt. Hon. Michael Ancram QC MP – Deputy Leader of the Conservative Party, Shadow Foreign Secretary and Shadow Secretary of State for International Affairs
- Rt. Hon. Oliver Letwin MP – Shadow Chancellor of the Exchequer and Shadow Secretary of State for Economic Affairs
- Rt. Hon. David Davis MP – Shadow Home Secretary and Shadow Secretary of State for Home, Constitutional and Legal Affairs
- Dr. Liam Fox MP and Rt. Hon. Maurice Saatchi, Lord Saatchi – Chairman of the Conservative Party
- Tim Yeo MP – Shadow Secretary of State for Public Services, Education and Health
- Rt. Hon. Theresa May MP – Shadow Secretary of State for Environment and Transport
- Rt. Hon. Thomas Galbraith, Lord Strathclyde PC – Shadow Leader of the House of Lords
- Rt. Hon. David Curry MP – Shadow Secretary of State for Local and Devolved Government Affairs
- David Willetts MP – Head of policy co-ordination and Shadow Secretary of State for Work and Pensions, Economic Affairs
- Rt. Hon. David Maclean MP – Opposition Chief Whip

=== Junior Shadow Ministers ===
- Hon. Nicholas Soames MP – Shadow Secretary of State for Defence, International Affairs
- John Bercow MP – Shadow Secretary of State for International Development, International Affairs
- Rt. Hon. James Arbuthnot MP – Shadow Secretary of State for Business and Industrial Strategy, Economic Affairs
- Howard Flight MP – Shadow Chief Secretary to the Treasury, Economic Affairs
- Stephen O'Brien MP – Shadow Secretary of State for Industry, Economic Affairs
- Dominic Grieve MP – Attorney General, Home, Constitutional and Legal Affairs
- Tim Collins CBE MP – Shadow Secretary of State for Education and Skills, Public Services, Education and Health
- Eric Pickles MP – Shadow Secretary of State for Local Government, Local and Devolved Government Affairs
- Alan Duncan MP – Shadow Secretary of State for Constitutional Affairs, Home, Constitutional and Legal Affairs
- Julie Kirkbride MP – Secretary of State for Culture, Media and Sport, Home, Constitutional and Legal Affairs
- Andrew Lansley MP – Shadow Secretary of State for Health, Public Services, Education and Health
- Caroline Spelman MP – Shadow Secretary of State for the Environment and Shadow Minister for Women, Environment and Transport
- Damian Green MP – Shadow Secretary of State for Transport, Environment and Transport
- John Whittingdale MP – Shadow Secretary of State for Agriculture, Fisheries and Food, Environment and Transport
- Oliver Heald MP – Shadow Leader of the House of Commons
- Hon. Bernard Jenkin MP – Shadow Secretary of State for the Regions, Local and Devolved Government Affairs
- David Lidington MP – Shadow Secretary of State for Northern Ireland, Local and Devolved Government Affairs
- Bill Wiggin MP – Shadow Secretary of State for Wales, Local and Devolved Government Affairs
- Peter Duncan MP – Shadow Secretary of State for Scotland, Local and Devolved Government Affairs
- Christopher Prout, Lord Kingsland QC – Shadow Lord Chancellor, Home, Constitutional and Legal Affairs
- Andrew Tyrie MP – Shadow Financial Secretary to the Treasury

== Michael Howard Shadow Cabinet reshuffle, 15 March 2004 ==
There was a minor reshuffle of the Shadow Cabinet due to the stepping down of Rt. Hon. David Curry MP as Shadow Secretary of State for Local and Devolved Government Affairs

== Shadow Cabinet (15 March 2004 – 14 June 2004) ==
- Rt. Hon. Michael Howard QC MP – Leader of Her Majesty's Loyal Opposition and Leader of the Conservative Party
- Rt. Hon. Michael Ancram QC MP – Deputy Leader of the Conservative Party and Shadow Foreign Secretary
- Rt. Hon. Oliver Letwin MP – Shadow Chancellor of the Exchequer
- Rt. Hon. David Davis MP – Shadow Home Secretary
- Dr. Liam Fox MP and Rt. Hon. Maurice Saatchi, Lord Saatchi – Chairman of the Conservative Party
- Tim Yeo MP – Shadow Secretary of State for Public Services, Education and Health
- Rt. Hon. Theresa May MP – Shadow Secretary of State for Environment and Transport
- Rt. Hon. Thomas Galbraith, Lord Strathclyde PC – Shadow Leader of the House of Lords
- Caroline Spelman MP – Shadow Secretary of State for Local and Devolved Government Affairs
- David Willetts MP – Head of policy co-ordination and Shadow Secretary of State for Work and Pensions
- Rt. Hon. David Maclean MP – Opposition Chief Whip

=== Junior Shadow Ministers ===
- Hon. Nicholas Soames MP – Shadow Secretary of State for Defence
- John Bercow MP – Shadow Secretary of State for International Development
- Rt. Hon. James Arbuthnot MP – Shadow Secretary of State for Trade
- Howard Flight MP – Shadow Chief Secretary to the Treasury
- Stephen O'Brien MP – Shadow Secretary of State for Industry
- Dominic Grieve MP – Attorney General
- Tim Collins CBE MP – Shadow Secretary of State for Education and Skills
- Eric Pickles MP – Shadow Secretary of State for Local Government
- Alan Duncan MP – Shadow Secretary of State for Constitutional Affairs
- Julie Kirkbride MP – Secretary of State for Culture, Media and Sport
- Andrew Lansley MP – Shadow Secretary of State for Health
- Richard Ottaway MP – Shadow Secretary of State for the Environment
- Andrew Tyrie MP – Shadow Paymaster General
- Eleanor Laing MP – Shadow Minister for Women
- Damian Green MP – Shadow Secretary of State for Transport
- John Whittingdale MP – Shadow Secretary of State for Agriculture, Fisheries and Food
- Oliver Heald MP – Shadow Leader of the House of Commons
- Hon. Bernard Jenkin MP – Shadow Secretary of State for the Regions
- David Lidington MP – Shadow Secretary of State for Northern Ireland
- Bill Wiggin MP – Shadow Secretary of State for Wales
- Peter Duncan MP – Shadow Secretary of State for Scotland
- Christopher Prout, Lord Kingsland QC – Shadow Lord Chancellor

== Shadow Cabinet (14 June 2004 – 6 May 2005) ==
- Rt. Hon. Michael Howard QC MP – Leader of Her Majesty's Loyal Opposition and Leader of the Conservative Party
- Rt. Hon. Michael Ancram QC MP – Deputy Leader of the Conservative Party and Shadow Foreign Secretary
- Rt. Hon. Oliver Letwin MP – Shadow Chancellor of the Exchequer
- Rt. Hon. David Davis MP – Shadow Home Secretary
- Dr. Liam Fox MP and Rt. Hon. Maurice Saatchi, Lord Saatchi – Chairman of the Conservative Party
- Tim Yeo MP – Shadow Secretary of State for Environment and Transport
- Rt. Hon. Theresa May MP – Shadow Secretary of State for the Family
- Rt. Hon. Thomas Galbraith, Lord Strathclyde PC – Shadow Leader of the House of Lords
- Caroline Spelman MP – Shadow Secretary of State for Local and Devolved Government Affairs
- David Willetts MP – Shadow Secretary of State for Work and Pensions and Welfare Reform
- Rt. Hon. John Redwood MP – Shadow Secretary of State for Deregulation
- Andrew Lansley MP – Shadow Secretary of State for Health
- Tim Collins CBE MP – Shadow Secretary of State for Education and Skills
- Rt. Hon. David Maclean MP – Opposition Chief Whip

=== Junior Shadow Ministers ===
- Hon. Nicholas Soames MP – Shadow Secretary of State for Defence
- Rt. Hon. James Arbuthnot MP – Shadow Secretary of State for Trade
- George Osborne MP – Shadow Chief Secretary to the Treasury
- Stephen O'Brien MP – Shadow Secretary of State for Industry
- Dominic Grieve MP – Shadow Attorney General
- Eric Pickles MP – Shadow Secretary of State for Local Government
- Alan Duncan MP – Shadow Secretary of State for International Development
- Andrew Tyrie MP – Shadow Paymaster General
- Eleanor Laing MP – Shadow Minister for Women
- James Paice – Shadow Secretary of State for Agriculture, Fisheries and Food
- John Whittingdale MP – Shadow Secretary of State for Culture, Media and Sport
- Oliver Heald MP – Shadow Leader of the House of Commons and Shadow Secretary of State for Constitutional Affairs
- Hon. Bernard Jenkin MP – Shadow Secretary of State for the Regions
- David Lidington MP – Shadow Secretary of State for Northern Ireland
- Bill Wiggin MP – Shadow Secretary of State for Wales
- Peter Duncan MP – Shadow Secretary of State for Scotland
- David Cameron MP – Head of policy co-ordination
- Christopher Prout, Lord Kingsland QC – Shadow Lord Chancellor

== Shadow Cabinet (6 May 2005 – 5 December 2005) ==
Portfolio	Shadow Minister
Leader of the Conservative Party; Leader of Her Majesty's Most Loyal Opposition	The Rt Hon Michael Howard QC MP
Deputy Leader of the Opposition; Shadow Secretary of State for Defence	The Rt Hon Michael Ancram QC MP
Shadow Chancellor of the Exchequer	George Osborne MP
Shadow Foreign Secretary	Dr Liam Fox MP
Shadow Home Secretary	The Rt Hon David Davis MP
Shadow Secretary of State for Constitutional Affairs	Oliver Heald MP
Shadow Leader of the House of Commons	Chris Grayling MP
Leader of the Opposition in the House of Lords	The Rt Hon Thomas Galbraith, Lord Strathclyde PC
Shadow Secretary of State for Trade and Industry	David Willetts MP
Shadow Secretary of State for Education and Skills	David Cameron MP
Shadow Secretary of State for Transport	Alan Duncan MP
Shadow Secretary of State for Health	Andrew Lansley CBE MP
Shadow Secretary of State for Environment, Food and Rural Affairs	The Rt Hon Oliver Letwin MP
Shadow Secretary of State for the Family; Shadow Secretary of State for Culture, Media and Sport	The Rt Hon Theresa May MP
Shadow Secretary of State for International Development	Andrew Mitchell MP
Shadow Secretary of State for Deregulation	The Rt Hon John Redwood MP
Shadow Secretary of State for Work and Pensions	The Rt Hon Sir Malcolm Rifkind KCMG QC MP
Shadow Secretary of State for Local Government Affairs and Communities	Caroline Spelman MP
Shadow Secretary of State for Northern Ireland	David Lidington MP
Shadow Chief Secretary to the Treasury	Philip Hammond MP
Opposition Chief Whip	The Rt Hon David Maclean MP
Chairman of the Conservative Party	The Rt Hon Francis Maude MP
Other posts on the opposition frontbench
Shadow Secretary of State for Scotland; Shadow Minister for Women and Equality	Eleanor Laing
Shadow Secretary of State for Wales	Bill Wiggin
Deputy Chief Whip	Patrick McLoughlin
Shadow Attorney General for England and Wales	Dominic Grieve
Shadow Minister for Local Government	Eric Pickles
Shadow Minister for London	Mark Field
Shadow Minister for Energy	Bernard Jenkin
Shadow Minister for Business & Consumer Affairs	Charles Hendry
Shadow Minister for Homeland Security	Patrick Mercer OBE
Other posts at Conservative Headquarters
Deputy chairman	Raymond Monbiot CBE
Deputy chairman (Candidates)	Andrew MacKay
Vice-Chairmen (Campaigning)	Andrew Turner, Andrew Rosindell
Vice-Chairmen (Business)	Kay Coleman
Vice-Chairmen (Conservatives Direct)	Jennie Elias
Vice-Chairmen (Conservatives Abroad)	Nigel Evans
Vice-Chairmen (Candidates)	Patricia Morris, Baroness Morris of Bolton OBE
