= Duncan Smith shadow cabinet =

UK shadow cabinet from 2001 to 2003

Duncan Smith Shadow Cabinet
- Shadow cabinet of the United Kingdom
- 2001 – 2003
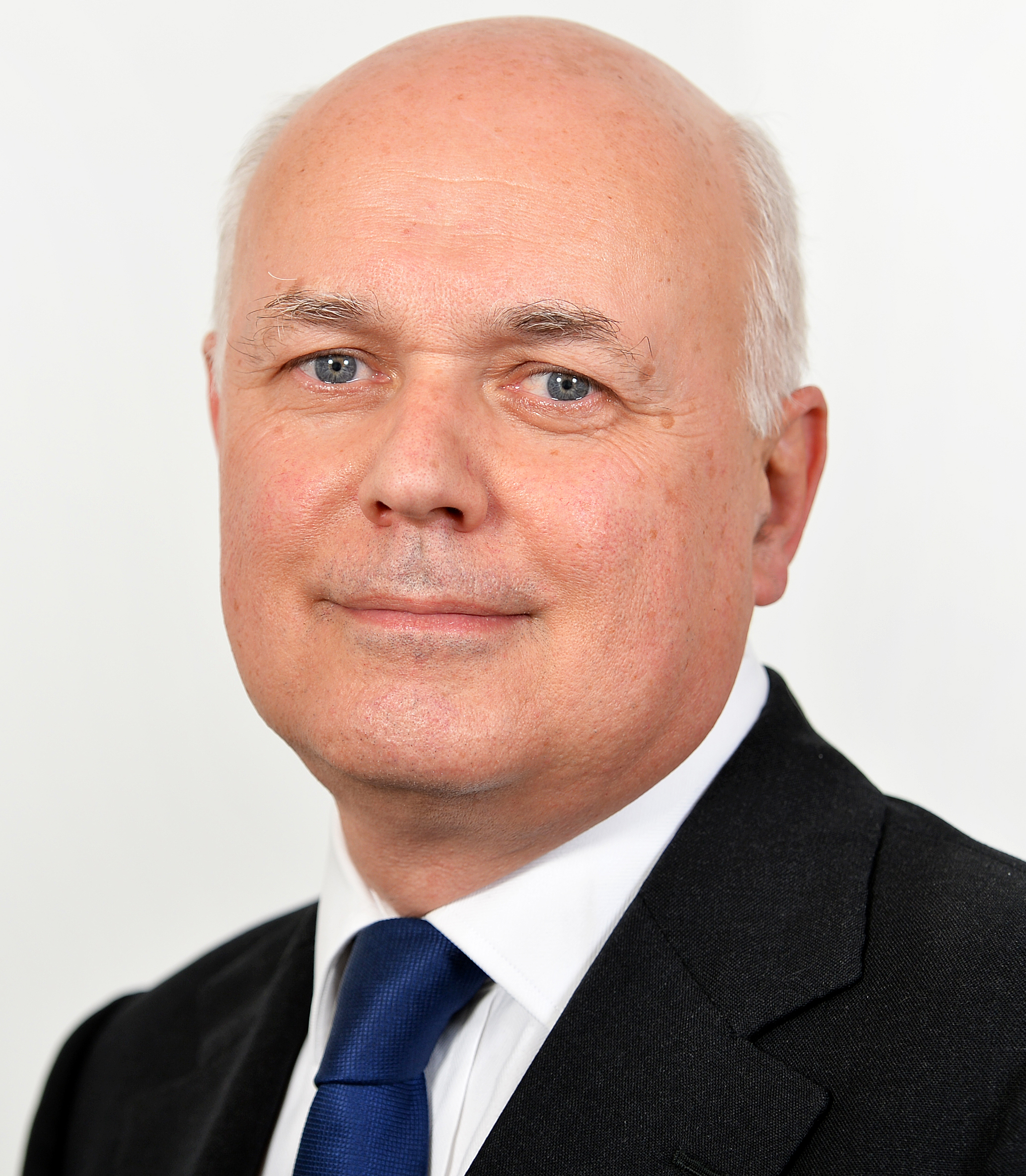
- Date formed: 13 September 2001
- Date dissolved: 6 November 2003

People and organisations
- Monarch: Elizabeth II
- Leader of the Opposition: Iain Duncan Smith
- Deputy Leader of the Opposition: Michael Ancram
- Member party: Conservative Party
- Status in legislature: Official Opposition

History
- Election: 2001 Conservative leadership election
- Outgoing election: 2003 Conservative Party leadership election
- Legislature terms: 53rd UK Parliament
- Predecessor: Hague shadow cabinet
- Successor: Howard shadow cabinet

The UK Shadow Cabinet was appointed by Conservative Party leader Iain Duncan Smith. Following his initial appointments in September 2001 Smith managed three reshuffles before his resignation as leader in November 2003.

== IDS Shadow Cabinet, 14 September 2001 ==
- Rt. Hon. Iain Duncan Smith MP — Leader of Her Majesty's Loyal Opposition and Leader of the Conservative Party
- Rt. Hon. Michael Ancram QC MP — Deputy Leader of the Conservative Party and Shadow Foreign Secretary
- Rt. Hon. Michael Howard QC MP — Shadow Chancellor of the Exchequer
- Rt. Hon. Oliver Letwin MP — Shadow Home Secretary
- Rt. Hon. David Davis MP — Chairman of the Conservative Party and Shadow Minister without Portfolio
- Rt. Hon. Thomas Galbraith, Lord Strathclyde PC — Shadow Leader of the House of Lords
- Rt. Hon. Eric Forth MP — Shadow Leader of the House of Commons and Shadow Chancellor of the Duchy of Lancaster
- Hon. Bernard Jenkin MP — Shadow Secretary of State for Defence
- David Willetts MP — Shadow Secretary of State for Work and Pensions
- Dr. Liam Fox MP — Shadow Secretary of State for Health
- Peter Ainsworth MP — Shadow Secretary of State for Environment, Food and Rural Affairs
- Tim Yeo MP — Shadow Secretary of State for Culture, Media and Sport
- Rt. Hon. Theresa May MP — Shadow Secretary of State for Transport, Local Government and the Regions
- Quentin Davies MP — Shadow Secretary of State for Northern Ireland
- John Whittingdale MP — Shadow Secretary of State for Trade and Industry
- Damian Green MP — Shadow Secretary of State for Education and Skills
- John Bercow MP — Shadow Chief Secretary to the Treasury
- Jacqui Lait MP — Shadow Secretary of State for Scotland
- Nigel Evans MP — Shadow Secretary of State for Wales
- Caroline Spelman MP — Shadow Secretary of State for International Development
- Rt. Hon. David Maclean MP — Opposition Chief Whip
- Rt. Hon. John Cope, Lord Cope of Berkeley PC — Opposition Lords Chief Whip

=== Junior Shadow Ministers ===
- Tim Collins CBE MP — Shadow Cabinet Office Minister
- Eric Pickles MP — Shadow Transport Minister
- Ann Winterton MP — Shadow Agriculture Minister
- James Clappison MP — Shadow Work Minister
- Bill Cash MP — Attorney General
- Christopher Prout, Lord Kingsland QC — Shadow Lord Chancellor

== IDS Shadow Cabinet reshuffle, 3 May 2002 ==
There was a minor reshuffle of the Shadow Cabinet due to the sacking of Ann Winterton as Shadow Rural Affairs Minister. Ann Winterton was sacked due to a racist speech at a rugby club, claiming that 'Pakis' were '10 a penny'. Winterton refused to resign, and was therefore sacked by IDS.

=== Shadow Cabinet ===
- Rt. Hon. Iain Duncan Smith MP — Leader of Her Majesty's Loyal Opposition and Leader of the Conservative Party
- Rt. Hon. Michael Ancram QC MP — Deputy Leader of the Conservative Party and Shadow Foreign Secretary
- Rt. Hon. Michael Howard QC MP — Shadow Chancellor of the Exchequer
- Rt. Hon. Oliver Letwin MP — Shadow Home Secretary
- Rt. Hon. David Davis MP — Chairman of the Conservative Party and Shadow Minister without Portfolio
- Rt. Hon. Thomas Galbraith, Lord Strathclyde PC — Shadow Leader of the House of Lords
- Rt. Hon. Eric Forth MP — Shadow Leader of the House of Commons and Shadow Chancellor of the Duchy of Lancaster
- Hon. Bernard Jenkin MP — Shadow Secretary of State for Defence
- David Willetts MP — Shadow Secretary of State for Work and Pensions
- Dr. Liam Fox MP — Shadow Secretary of State for Health
- Peter Ainsworth MP — Shadow Secretary of State for Environment, Food and Rural Affairs
- Tim Yeo MP — Shadow Secretary of State for Culture, Media and Sport
- Rt. Hon. Theresa May MP — Shadow Secretary of State for Transport, Local Government and the Regions
- Quentin Davies MP — Shadow Secretary of State for Northern Ireland
- John Whittingdale MP — Shadow Secretary of State for Trade and Industry
- Damian Green MP — Shadow Secretary of State for Education and Skills
- John Bercow MP — Shadow Chief Secretary to the Treasury
- Jacqui Lait MP — Shadow Secretary of State for Scotland
- Nigel Evans MP — Shadow Secretary of State for Wales
- Caroline Spelman MP — Shadow Secretary of State for International Development
- Rt. Hon. David Maclean MP — Opposition Chief Whip
- Rt. Hon. John Cope, Lord Cope of Berkeley PC — Opposition Lords Chief Whip

=== Junior Shadow Ministers ===
- Tim Collins CBE MP — Shadow Cabinet Office Minister
- Eric Pickles MP — Shadow Transport Minister
- David Lidington MP — Shadow Rural Affairs Minister
- James Clappison MP — Shadow Work Minister
- Bill Cash MP — Attorney General
- Christopher Prout, Lord Kingsland QC — Shadow Lord Chancellor

=== Changes from 18 September 2001 ===
- Ann Winterton is sacked from the Shadow Ministerial Team
- David Lidington enters the Shadow Ministerial Team as Shadow Rural Affairs Minister

== IDS Shadow Cabinet reshuffle, 23 July 2002 ==
- Rt. Hon. Iain Duncan Smith MP — Leader of Her Majesty's Loyal Opposition and Leader of the Conservative Party
- Rt. Hon. Michael Ancram QC MP — Deputy Leader of the Conservative Party and Shadow Foreign Secretary
- Rt. Hon. Michael Howard QC MP — Shadow Chancellor of the Exchequer
- Rt. Hon. Oliver Letwin MP — Shadow Home Secretary
- Rt. Hon. Theresa May MP — Chairman of the Conservative Party
- Rt. Hon. Thomas Galbraith, Lord Strathclyde PC — Shadow Leader of the House of Lords
- Rt. Hon. Eric Forth MP — Shadow Leader of the House of Commons and Shadow Chancellor of the Duchy of Lancaster
- Hon. Bernard Jenkin MP — Shadow Secretary of State for Defence
- David Willetts MP — Shadow Secretary of State for Work and Pensions
- Dr. Liam Fox MP — Shadow Secretary of State for Health
- David Lidington MP — Shadow Secretary of State for Environment, Food and Rural Affairs
- John Whittingdale MP — Shadow Secretary of State for Culture, Media and Sport
- Rt. Hon. David Davis MP — Shadow Secretary of State for the Office of the Deputy Prime Minister
- Quentin Davies MP — Shadow Secretary of State for Northern Ireland
- Tim Yeo MP — Shadow Secretary of State for Trade and Industry
- Damian Green MP — Shadow Secretary of State for Education and Skills
- Howard Flight MP — Shadow Chief Secretary to the Treasury
- Jacqui Lait MP — Shadow Secretary of State for Scotland
- Nigel Evans MP — Shadow Secretary of State for Wales
- Caroline Spelman MP — Shadow Secretary of State for International Development
- Tim Collins CBE MP; Shadow Secretary of State for Transport
- Eric Pickles MP — Secretary of State for Local Government and the Regions
- Rt. Hon. David Maclean MP — Opposition Chief Whip
- Rt. Hon. John Cope, Lord Cope of Berkeley PC — Opposition Lords Chief Whip

=== Junior Shadow Ministers ===
- John Hayes MP — Shadow Agriculture Minister
- James Clappison MP — Shadow Work Minister
- Bill Cash MP — Shadow Attorney General
- Christopher Prout, Lord Kingsland QC — Shadow Lord Chancellor

=== Changes from 3 May 2002 ===
- John Bercow leaves the Shadow Cabinet
- Peter Ainsworth leaves the Shadow Cabinet
- John Hayes enters the Shadow Ministerial Team as Shadow Rural Affairs Minister
- Howard Flight enters the Shadow Cabinet as Shadow Chief Secretary to the Treasury
- Owing to the resignation of Stephen Byers, the Department of Transport, Local Government and the Regions is divided between the new Secretary of State for Transport and the Office of the Deputy Prime Minister; Tim Collins CBE MP moves from Shadow Cabinet Office Minister to Shadow Secretary of State for Transport
- John Whittingdale moves from Shadow Secretary of State for Trade and Industry to Shadow Secretary of State for Culture, Media and Sport
- Tim Yeo moves from Shadow Secretary of State for Culture, Media and Sport to Shadow Secretary of State for Trade and Industry
- Theresa May moves from Shadow Secretary of State for Transport, Local Government and the Regions to Chairman of the Conservative Party
- David Davis is moved from Chairman of the Conservative Party to become Shadow Secretary of State for the Office of the Deputy Prime Minister
- David Lidington moves from Shadow Rural Affairs Minister to Shadow Secretary of State for Environment, Food and Rural Affairs

== IDS Shadow Cabinet reshuffle, 1 July 2003 ==
- Rt. Hon. Iain Duncan Smith MP — Leader of Her Majesty's Loyal Opposition and Leader of the Conservative Party
- Rt. Hon. Michael Ancram QC MP — Deputy Leader of the Conservative Party and Shadow Foreign Secretary
- Rt. Hon. Michael Howard QC MP — Shadow Chancellor of the Exchequer
- Rt. Hon. Oliver Letwin MP — Shadow Home Secretary
- Rt. Hon. Theresa May MP — Chairman of the Conservative Party
- Rt. Hon. Thomas Galbraith, Lord Strathclyde PC — Shadow Leader of the House of Lords
- Rt. Hon. Eric Forth MP — Shadow Leader of the House of Commons and Shadow Chancellor of the Duchy of Lancaster
- Hon. Bernard Jenkin MP — Shadow Secretary of State for Defence
- David Willetts MP — Shadow Secretary of State for Work and Pensions
- Dr. Liam Fox MP — Shadow Secretary of State for Health
- David Lidington MP — Shadow Secretary of State for Environment, Food and Rural Affairs
- John Whittingdale MP — Shadow Secretary of State for Culture, Media and Sport
- Rt. Hon. David Davis MP — Shadow Secretary of State for the Office of the Deputy Prime Minister
- Quentin Davies MP — Shadow Secretary of State for Northern Ireland
- Tim Yeo MP — Shadow Secretary of State for Trade and Industry
- Damian Green MP — Shadow Secretary of State for Education and Skills
- Howard Flight MP — Shadow Chief Secretary to the Treasury
- Jacqui Lait MP — Shadow Secretary of State for Scotland
- Nigel Evans MP — Shadow Secretary of State for Wales
- Caroline Spelman MP — Shadow Secretary of State for International Development
- Tim Collins CBE MP; Shadow Secretary of State for Transport
- Eric Pickles MP — Shadow Secretary of State for Local Government and the Regions
- Rt. Hon. David Maclean MP — Opposition Chief Whip
- Rt. Hon. John Cope, Lord Cope of Berkeley PC — Opposition Lords Chief Whip

=== Junior Shadow Ministers ===
- John Hayes MP — Shadow Rural Affairs Minister
- James Clappison MP — Shadow Work Minister
- Bill Cash MP — Shadow Attorney General and Shadow Secretary of State for Constitutional Affairs
- Christopher Prout, Lord Kingsland QC — Shadow Lord Chancellor
- Patick Mercer OBE MP — Shadow Homeland Security Minister

=== Changes from 23 July 2002 ===
- Patrick Mercer becomes the newly created Shadow Homeland Security Minister
