= Shadow Chief Secretary to the Treasury =

Position in the British parliamentary opposition

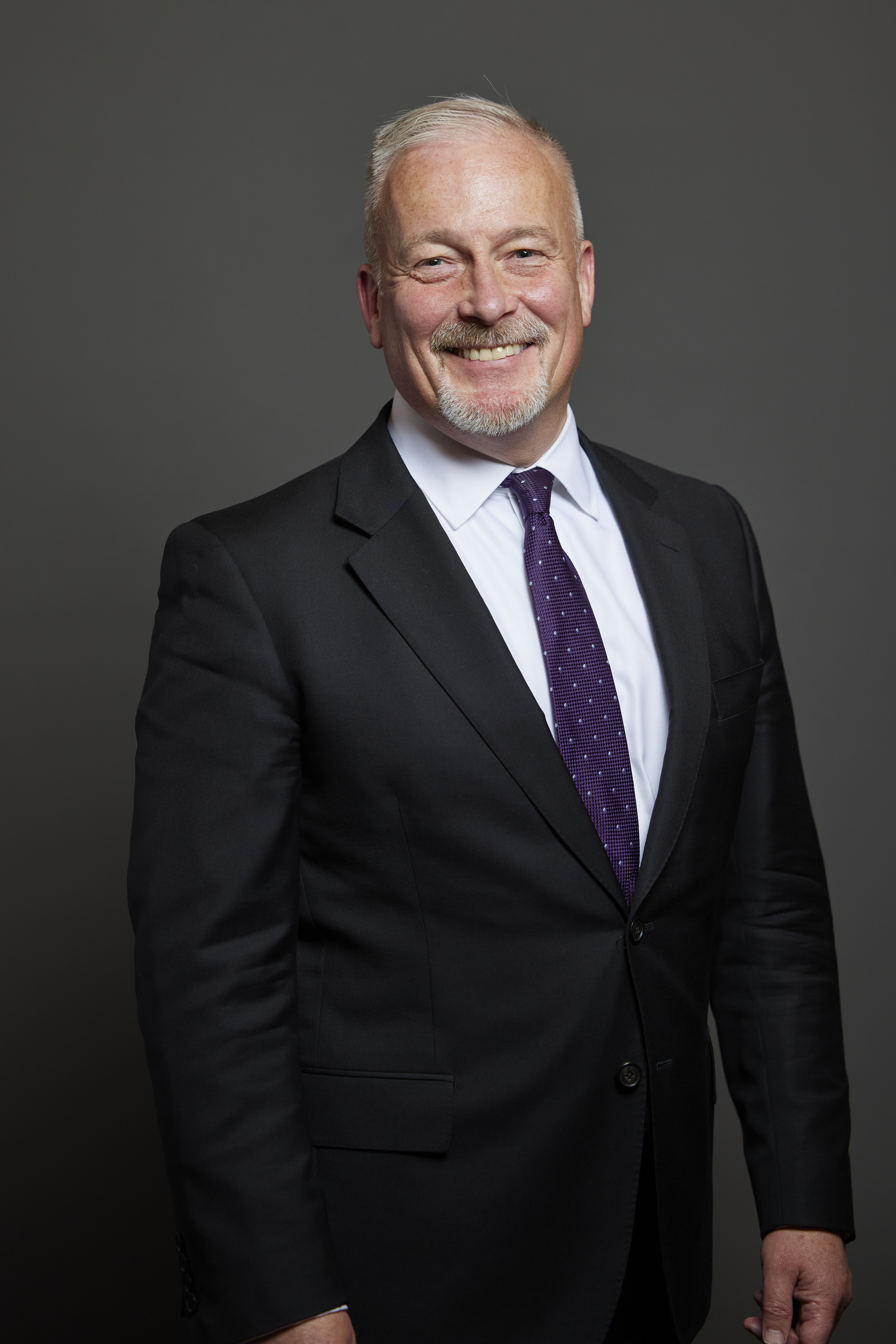
- Incumbent; Richard Fuller since 5 November 2024
- Member of: Official Opposition Shadow Cabinet
- Appointer: Leader of the Opposition

The shadow chief secretary to the treasury is the most junior member of the Shadow Cabinet, and is the deputy to the shadow chancellor of the exchequer. The shadow chief secretary to the treasury acts as the primary opposition to the equivalent Governmental position, the chief secretary to the treasury, who is deputy to the chancellor of the exchequer. Currently the position of shadow chief secretary to the treasury is held by Richard Fuller.

== List of shadow chief secretaries to the treasury ==
Name	Entered office	Left office	Political party	Shadow Cabinet
Peter Walker	6 October 1965	19 April 1966	Conservative	Heath
Margaret Thatcher	19 April 1966	10 October 1967	Conservative	Heath
Patrick Jenkin	10 October 1967	19 June 1970	Conservative	Heath
Dick Taverne	19 June 1970	22 July 1970	Labour	Wilson II
Joel Barnett	22 July 1970	4 March 1974	Labour	Wilson II
Tom Boardman	4 March 1974	12 March 1974	Conservative	Heath II
Maurice Macmillan	12 March 1974	13 June 1974	Conservative	Heath II
David Howell	13 June 1974	7 November 1974	Conservative	Heath II
Margaret Thatcher	7 November 1974	11 February 1975	Conservative	Heath II
David Howell	18 February 1975	4 November 1977	Conservative	Thatcher
Peter Rees	4 November 1977	4 May 1979	Conservative	Thatcher
Joel Barnett	4 May 1979	14 July 1979	Labour	Callaghan
Unknown	14 July 1979	8 December 1980	Labour	Callaghan
Robert Sheldon	8 December 1980	31 October 1983	Labour	Foot
Unknown	31 October 1983	30 October 1986	Labour	Kinnock
Bryan Gould	30 October 1986	13 July 1987	Labour	Kinnock
Gordon Brown	13 July 1987	9 January 1989	Labour	Kinnock
Margaret Beckett	9 January 1989	18 July 1992	Labour	Kinnock
Harriet Harman	18 July 1992	21 July 1994	Labour	Smith
Harriet Harman	18 July 1992	21 July 1994	Labour	Beckett
Andrew Smith	21 July 1994	25 July 1996	Labour	Beckett
Andrew Smith	21 July 1994	25 July 1996	Labour	Blair
Alistair Darling	25 July 1996	2 May 1997	Labour	Blair
Michael Jack	2 May 1997	11 June 1997	Conservative	Major
David Heathcoat-Amory	19 June 1997	26 September 2000	Conservative	Hague
Sir Oliver Letwin	26 September 2000	18 September 2001	Conservative	Hague
John Bercow	18 September 2001	11 November 2003	Conservative	Duncan Smith
Howard Flight	11 November 2003	14 June 2004	Conservative	Howard
George Osborne	14 June 2004	10 May 2005	Conservative	Howard
Philip Hammond	10 May 2005	6 December 2005	Conservative	Howard
Theresa Villiers	6 December 2005	2 July 2007	Conservative	Cameron
Philip Hammond	2 July 2007	11 May 2010	Conservative	Cameron
Liam Byrne	11 May 2010	8 October 2010	Labour	Harman
Angela Eagle	8 October 2010	7 October 2011	Labour	Miliband
Rachel Reeves	7 October 2011	7 October 2013	Labour	Miliband
Chris Leslie	7 October 2013	11 May 2015	Labour	Miliband
Shabana Mahmood	11 May 2015	13 September 2015	Labour	Harman II
Seema Malhotra	13 September 2015	26 June 2016	Labour	Corbyn
Rebecca Long-Bailey	27 June 2016	9 February 2017	Labour	Corbyn
Peter Dowd	9 February 2017	6 April 2020	Labour	Corbyn
Bridget Phillipson	6 April 2020	29 November 2021	Labour	Starmer
Pat McFadden	29 November 2021	4 September 2023	Labour	Starmer
Darren Jones	4 September 2023	5 July 2024	Labour	Starmer
Laura Trott	8 July 2024	4 November 2024	Conservative	Sunak
Richard Fuller	5 November 2024	Incumbent	Conservative	Badenoch
