= Shadow Secretary of State for Housing, Communities and Local Government =

Member of the UK Shadow Cabinet

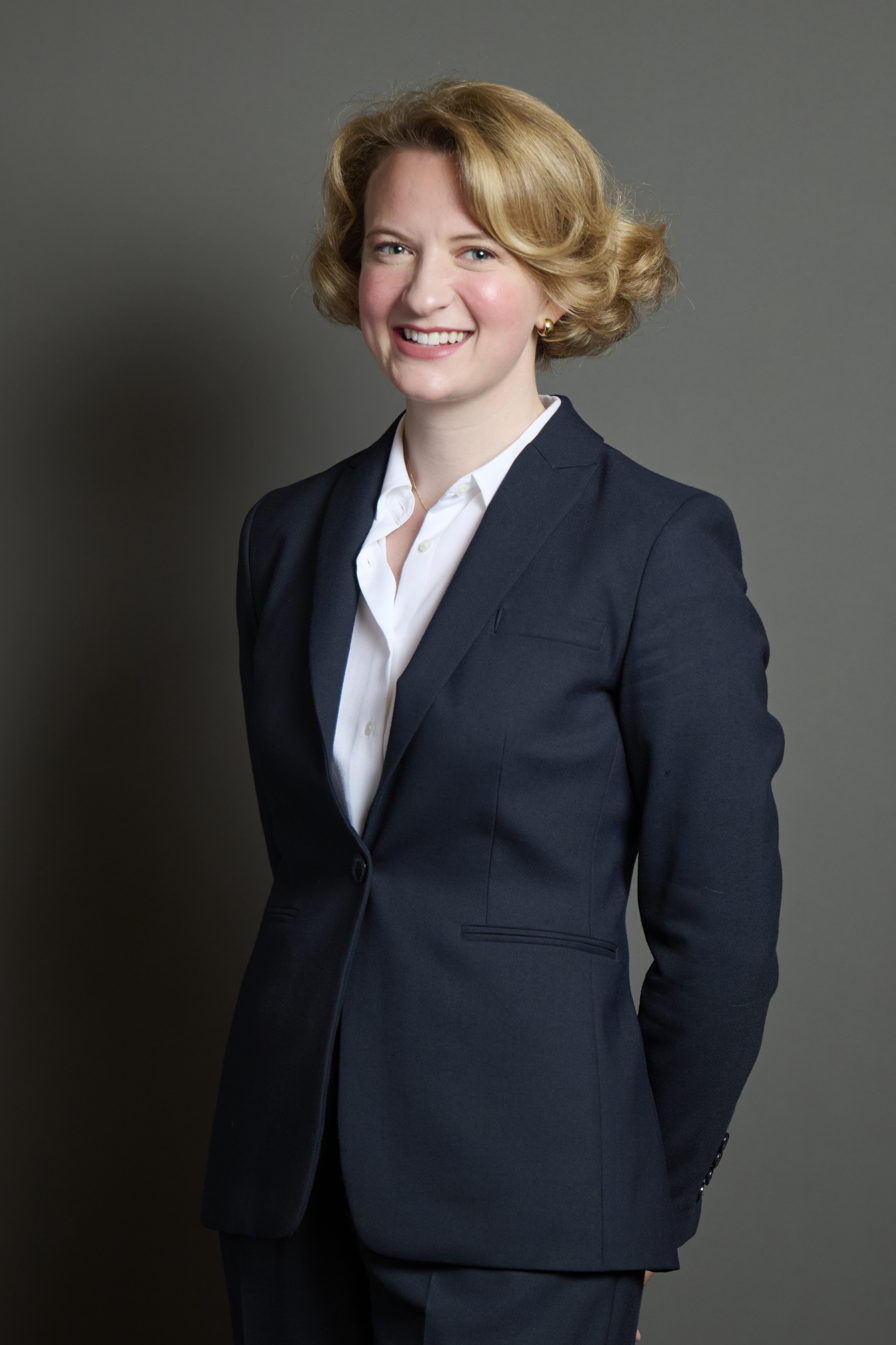
- Incumbent; Katie Lam since 31 August 2026
- Shadow Cabinet
- Appointer: Leader of the Opposition

The shadow secretary of state for housing, communities and local government is a position with the UK Opposition's Shadow Cabinet; if the opposition party forms a new government, the designated person is a likely choice to become the new secretary of state for housing, communities and local government.

The position has existed in many iterations, first as Environment, Transport and the Regions in 1997 after the Government's reorganisation. The portfolio shifted among government departments for many years; under Conservative leader Michael Howard, the arrangement differed slightly, with a shadow secretary of state for local and devolved government affairs in the Howard Shadow Cabinet, supervising a shadow local government secretary and a shadow regions secretary outside of it.

In 2006, the portfolio was renamed Communities and Local Government, until 2021 when it got its current name with the added portfolio of housing; until 2021, the shadow communities secretary did not hold responsibility for housing as the Labour Party created a separate position, shadow secretary of state for housing in 2016. In 2024, the Labour Party retired the "Levelling up" title from the official cabinet position, with the Conservative Party following suit in their Shadow Cabinet.

This position is currently held by Katie Lam.

== List of shadow secretaries ==
=== Shadow Minister of Housing and Local Government ===
Name	Took office	Left office	Political party	Shadow Cabinet
Dick Mitchison	15 July 1955	November 1959	Labour	Attlee
Dick Mitchison	15 July 1955	November 1959	Labour	Gaitskell
Michael Stewart	November 1959	16 October 1964	Labour	Gaitskell
Michael Stewart	November 1959	16 October 1964	Labour	Brown
Michael Stewart	November 1959	16 October 1964	Labour	Wilson
Keith Joseph	16 October 1964	29 October 1964	Conservative	Douglas-Home
John Boyd-Carpenter	29 October 1964	19 April 1966	Conservative	Douglas-Home
John Boyd-Carpenter	29 October 1964	19 April 1966	Conservative	Heath
Geoffrey Rippon	19 April 1966	14 November 1968	Conservative	Heath
Peter Walker	14 November 1968	19 June 1970	Conservative	Heath
Anthony Crosland	19 June 1970	15 October 1970	Labour	Wilson II
=== Shadow Minister for Local Government and Housing ===
Name	Took office	Left office	Political party	Shadow Cabinet
Jack Straw	25 July 1992	20 October 1994	Labour	Smith
Jack Straw	25 July 1992	20 October 1994	Labour	Beckett
Jack Straw	25 July 1992	20 October 1994	Labour	Blair
=== Shadow Secretary of State for Environment, Transport and the Regions ===
Name	Took office	Left office	Political party	Shadow Cabinet
Norman Fowler	11 June 1997	1 June 1998	Conservative	Hague
Gillian Shephard	1 June 1998	14 June 1999	Conservative	Hague
John Redwood	14 June 1999	2 February 2000	Conservative	Hague
Archie Norman	2 February 2000	18 September 2001	Conservative	Hague
=== Shadow Secretary of State for Transport, Local Government and the Regions ===
Name	Took office	Left office	Political party	Shadow Cabinet
Theresa May	18 September 2001	6 June 2002	Conservative	Duncan Smith
=== Shadow Secretary of State for Local Government and the Regions ===
Name	Took office	Left office	Political party	Shadow Cabinet
Eric Pickles	6 June 2002	23 July 2002	Conservative	Duncan Smith
=== Shadow Secretary of State for the Office of the Deputy Prime Minister ===
Name	Took office	Left office	Political party	Shadow Cabinet
David Davis	23 July 2002	11 November 2003	Conservative	Duncan Smith
=== Shadow Secretary of State for Local and Devolved Government Affairs ===
Name	Took office	Left office	Political party	Shadow Cabinet
David Curry	11 November 2003	15 March 2004	Conservative	Howard
Caroline Spelman	15 March 2004	6 May 2005	Conservative	Howard
=== Shadow Secretary of State for Local Government Affairs and Communities ===
Name	Took office	Left office	Political party	Shadow Cabinet
Caroline Spelman	6 May 2005	5 December 2005	Conservative	Howard
=== Shadow Secretary of State for the Office of the Deputy Prime Minister ===
Name	Took office	Left office	Political party	Shadow Cabinet
Caroline Spelman	5 December 2005	6 May 2006	Conservative	Cameron
=== Shadow Secretary of State for Communities and Local Government ===
Name	Took office	Left office	Political party	Shadow Cabinet
Caroline Spelman	6 May 2006	2 July 2007	Conservative	Cameron
Eric Pickles	2 July 2007	19 January 2009	Conservative	Cameron
Caroline Spelman	19 January 2009	11 May 2010	Conservative	Cameron
John Denham	12 May 2010	8 October 2010	Labour	Harman
Caroline Flint	8 October 2010	7 October 2011	Labour	Miliband
Hilary Benn	7 October 2011	8 May 2015	Labour	Miliband
Emma Reynolds	8 May 2015	14 September 2015	Labour	Harman II
Jon Trickett	14 September 2015	28 June 2016	Labour	Corbyn
Grahame Morris	28 June 2016	7 October 2016	Labour	Corbyn
Teresa Pearce	7 October 2016	2 April 2017	Labour	Corbyn
Roberta Blackman-Woods	2 April 2017	14 June 2017	Labour	Corbyn
Andrew Gwynne	14 June 2017	6 April 2020	Labour	Corbyn
Steve Reed	6 April 2020	29 November 2021	Labour	Starmer
=== Shadow Secretary of State for Levelling Up, Housing and Communities ===
Name	Took office	Left office	Political party	Shadow Cabinet
Lisa Nandy	29 November 2021	4 September 2023	Labour	Starmer
Angela Rayner	4 September 2023	5 July 2024	Labour	Starmer
=== Shadow Secretary of State for Housing, Communities and Local Government ===
Name	Took office	Left office	Political party	Shadow Cabinet
Kemi Badenoch	8 July 2024	2 November 2024	Conservative	Sunak
Kevin Hollinrake	5 November 2024	22 July 2025	Conservative	Badenoch
James Cleverly	22 July 2025	31 August 2026	Conservative	Badenoch
Katie Lam	31 August 2026	Incumbent	Conservative	Badenoch
