= Shadow Secretary of State for Northern Ireland =

Member of the British Shadow Cabinet

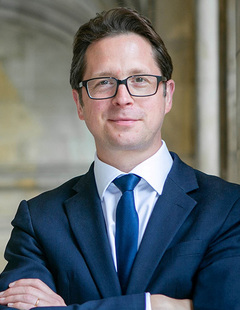
- Incumbent; Alex Burghart since 8 July 2024
- Appointer: Leader of the Opposition
- Inaugural holder: Merlyn Rees
- Formation: 24 March 1972
- Website: The Shadow Cabinet

The shadow secretary of state for Northern Ireland is a member of the British Shadow Cabinet responsible for the scrutiny of the secretary of state for Northern Ireland and their department, the Northern Ireland Office. The post is held by Alex Burghart.

Until recently there had been a 'bi-partisan' attitude to Northern Ireland affairs in the House of Commons but the role is influenced by the relationship between the main Official Opposition and parties in the country. The Conservative Party, for example, generally supports the unionist cause and in 2008 re-formalised a (since ended) link with the Ulster Unionist Party and relied on the support of the Democratic Unionist Party until the 2019 United Kingdom General Election in the House of Commons, while Labour has traditionally supported Irish nationalism and is loosely allied to the Social Democratic and Labour Party (SDLP). The Liberal Democrats are linked with the cross-community Alliance Party.

== Shadow secretaries of state ==
Name	Entered office	Left office	Length of Term	Political party	Shadow Cabinet
Merlyn Rees	24 March 1972	4 March 1974	1 year, 345 days	Labour	Harold Wilson
Francis Pym	4 March 1974	29 October 1974	239 days	Conservative	Edward Heath
Ian Gilmour	29 October 1974	18 February 1975	112 days	Conservative	Edward Heath
Airey Neave	18 February 1975	30 March 1979	4 years, 40 days	Conservative	Edward Heath
Airey Neave	18 February 1975	30 March 1979	4 years, 40 days	Conservative	Edward Heath
Airey Neave	18 February 1975	30 March 1979	4 years, 40 days	Conservative	Margaret Thatcher
Roy Mason	4 May 1979	14 July 1979	71 days	Labour	James Callaghan
Brynmor John	14 July 1979	8 December 1980	1 year, 147 days	Labour	James Callaghan
Don Concannon	8 December 1980	31 October 1983	2 years, 327 days	Labour	Michael Foot
Peter Archer	31 October 1983	13 July 1987	3 years, 255 days	Labour	Neil Kinnock
Kevin McNamara	13 July 1987	20 October 1994	7 years, 99 days	Labour	Neil Kinnock
Kevin McNamara	13 July 1987	20 October 1994	7 years, 99 days	Labour	John Smith
Kevin McNamara	13 July 1987	20 October 1994	7 years, 99 days	Labour	Margaret Beckett
Mo Mowlam	20 October 1994	2 May 1997	2 years, 194 days	Labour	Tony Blair
Andrew Mackay	23 June 1997	14 September 2001	4 years, 83 days	Conservative	William Hague
Quentin Davies	14 September 2001	11 November 2003	2 years, 58 days	Conservative	Iain Duncan Smith
David Lidington	11 November 2003	2 July 2007	3 years, 233 days	Conservative	Michael Howard
David Lidington	11 November 2003	2 July 2007	3 years, 233 days	Conservative	David Cameron
Owen Paterson	2 July 2007	11 May 2010	2 years, 313 days	Conservative	David Cameron
Shaun Woodward	11 May 2010	7 October 2011	1 year, 149 days	Labour	Harriet Harman
Shaun Woodward	11 May 2010	7 October 2011	1 year, 149 days	Labour	Ed Miliband
Vernon Coaker	7 October 2011	7 October 2013	2 years, 0 days	Labour	Ed Miliband
Ivan Lewis	7 October 2013	13 September 2015	1 year, 341 days	Labour	Ed Miliband
Ivan Lewis	7 October 2013	13 September 2015	1 year, 341 days	Labour	Harriet Harman
Vernon Coaker	13 September 2015	26 June 2016	287 days	Labour	Jeremy Corbyn
Dave Anderson	26 June 2016	14 June 2017	353 days	Labour	Jeremy Corbyn
Owen Smith	14 June 2017	23 March 2018	282 days	Labour	Jeremy Corbyn
Tony Lloyd	23 March 2018	28 April 2020	2 years, 36 days	Labour	Jeremy Corbyn
Louise Haigh	28 April 2020 (Note: Interim from 6 April 2020)	29 November 2021	1 year, 215 days	Labour	Keir Starmer
Peter Kyle	29 November 2021	4 September 2023	1 year, 279 days	Labour	Keir Starmer
Hilary Benn	4 September 2023	5 July 2024	305 days	Labour	Keir Starmer
Alex Burghart	8 July 2024	Incumbent	2 years, 137 days	Conservative	Rishi Sunak
Alex Burghart	8 July 2024	Incumbent	2 years, 137 days	Conservative	Kemi Badenoch

== See also ==
- Secretary of State for Northern Ireland
- Northern Ireland Office
- UK Shadow Cabinet
- Liberal Democrat Frontbench Team
- Northern Ireland Affairs Committee
- Northern Ireland Grand Committee
