= Hague shadow cabinet =

Shadow cabinet of William Hague in the UK

Hague Shadow Cabinet
- Shadow cabinet of the United Kingdom
- 1997 – 2001
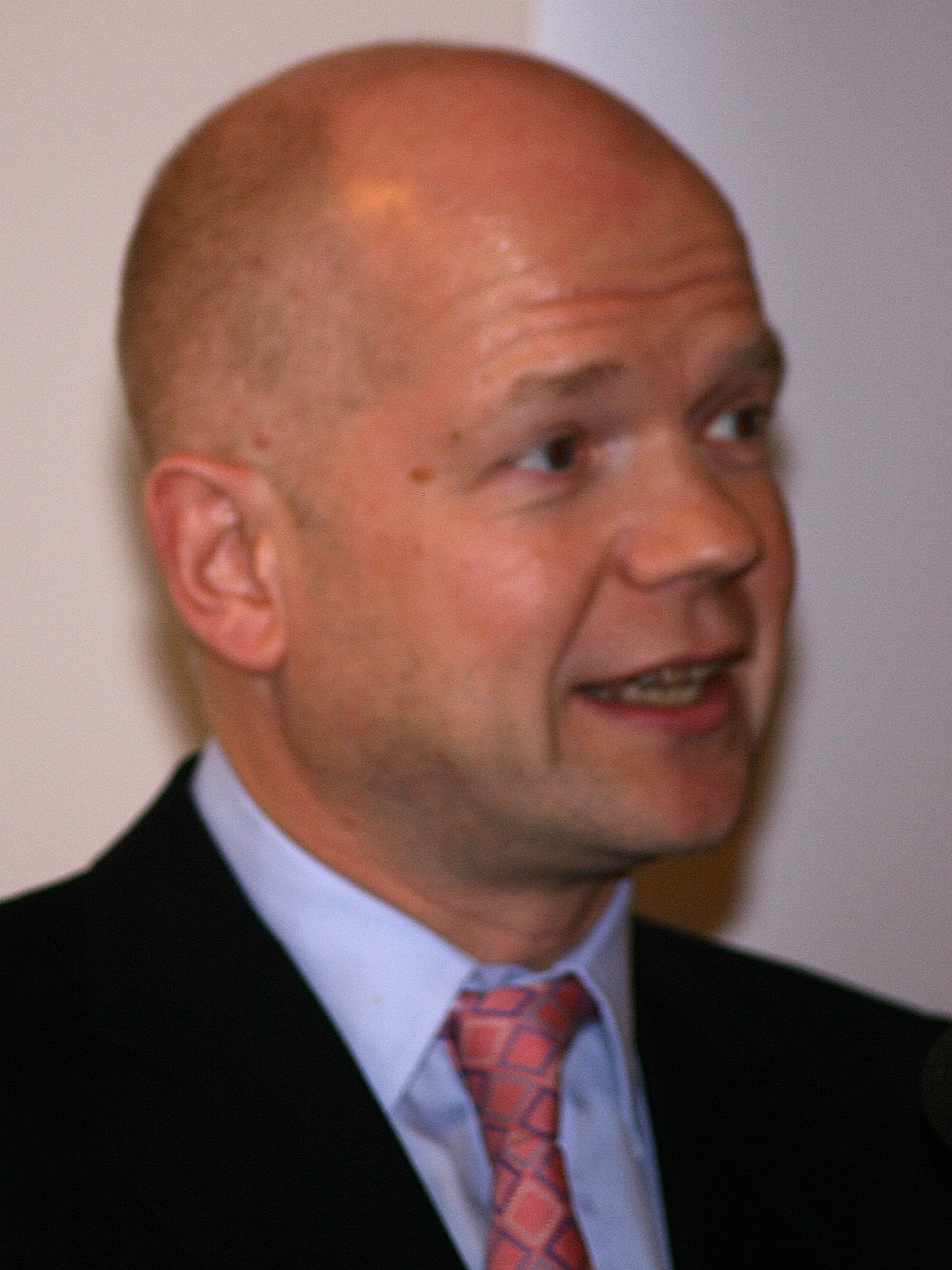
- Date formed: 19 June 1997
- Date dissolved: 13 September 2001

People and organisations
- Monarch: Elizabeth II
- Leader of the Opposition: William Hague
- Deputy Leader of the Opposition: Peter Lilley (1998-1999); Michael Portillo (2000-2001)
- Member party: Conservative Party
- Status in legislature: Official Opposition

History
- Election: 1997 Conservative leadership election
- Outgoing election: 2001 Conservative Party leadership election
- Legislature terms: 52nd UK Parliament; 53rd UK Parliament
- Predecessor: Major shadow cabinet
- Successor: Duncan Smith shadow cabinet

The Shadow Cabinet appointed by Conservative Party leader William Hague was the Official Opposition Shadow Cabinet from 1997 to 2001. Following his initial appointments in June 1997, Hague reshuffled the Shadow Cabinet five times before his resignation as leader following defeat in the 2001 general election.

== Shadow Cabinet list ==
| Portfolio | Shadow Minister | Term |
|---|---|---|
| Leader of Her Majesty's Loyal Opposition Leader of the Conservative Party | Rt Hon. William Hague MP | 1997–2001 |
| Deputy Leader of the Conservative Party | Rt Hon. Peter Lilley MP | 1998–1999 |
| Shadow Chancellor of the Exchequer | Rt Hon. Peter Lilley MP | 1997–1998 |
| Shadow Chancellor of the Exchequer | Rt Hon. Francis Maude MP | 1998–2000 |
| Shadow Chancellor of the Exchequer | Rt Hon. Michael Portillo MP | 2000–2001 |
| Deputy leader of the Opposition | Rt Hon. Michael Portillo MP | 2000–2001 |
| Leader of the Opposition in the House of Lords | Rt Hon. Viscount Cranborne PC | 1997–1998 |
| Leader of the Opposition in the House of Lords | Rt Hon. Thomas Galbraith, Lord Strathclyde PC | 1998–2010 |
| Opposition Chief Whip in the House of Lords | Rt Hon. Thomas Galbraith, Lord Strathclyde PC | 1997–1998 |
| Opposition Chief Whip in the House of Lords | Oliver Eden, Lord Henley | 1998–2001 |
| Opposition Chief Whip | Rt Hon. James Arbuthnot MP | 1997–2001 |
| Shadow Lord Chancellor | Rt Hon Christopher Prout, Lord Kingsland QC | 1997–2009 |
| Shadow Foreign Secretary | Rt Hon. Michael Howard QC MP | 1997–1999 |
| Shadow Foreign Secretary | Rt Hon. John Maples MP | 1999–2000 |
| Shadow Foreign Secretary | Rt Hon. Francis Maude MP | 2000–2001 |
| Shadow Home Secretary | Rt Hon. Sir Brian Mawhinney MP | 1997–1998 |
| Shadow Home Secretary | Rt Hon. Sir Norman Fowler MP | 1998–1999 |
| Shadow Home Secretary | Rt Hon. Ann Widdecombe MP | 1999–2001 |
| Chairman of the Conservative Party | Rt Hon. Cecil Parkinson, Lord Parkinson PC | 1997–1998 |
| Chairman of the Conservative Party | Rt Hon. Michael Ancram QC MP | 1998–2001 |
| Shadow Secretary of State for Defence | Rt Hon. Sir George Young Bt MP | 1997–1998 |
| Shadow Secretary of State for Defence | Rt Hon. John Maples MP | 1998–1999 |
| Shadow Secretary of State for Defence | Rt Hon. Iain Duncan Smith MP | 1999–2001 |
| Shadow Secretary of State for Education and Employment | Rt Hon. Stephen Dorrell MP | 1997–1998 |
| Shadow Secretary of State for Education and Employment | David Willetts MP | 1998–1999 |
| Shadow Secretary of State for Education and Employment | Theresa May MP | 1999–2001 |
| Shadow Secretary of State for the Environment, Transport and the Regions | Rt Hon. Sir Norman Fowler MP | 1997–1998 |
| Shadow Secretary of State for the Environment, Transport and the Regions | Rt Hon. Gillian Shephard MP | 1998–1999 |
| Shadow Secretary of State for the Environment, Transport and the Regions | Rt Hon. John Redwood MP | 1999–2000 |
| Shadow Secretary of State for the Environment, Transport and the Regions | Archie Norman MP | 2000–2001 |
| Shadow Secretary of State for Trade and Industry | Rt Hon. John Redwood MP | 1997–1999 |
| Shadow Secretary of State for Trade and Industry | Mrs Angela Browning MP | 1999–2000 |
| Shadow Secretary of State for Trade and Industry | Rt Hon. David Heathcoat-Amory MP | 2000–2001 |
| Shadow Leader of the House of Commons Shadow Chancellor of the Duchy of Lancaster | Rt Hon. Gillian Shephard MP | 1997–1998 |
| Shadow Leader of the House of Commons Shadow Chancellor of the Duchy of Lancaster | Rt Hon. Sir George Young Bt MP | 1998–2000 |
| Shadow Leader of the House of Commons Shadow Chancellor of the Duchy of Lancaster | Mrs Angela Browning MP | 2000–2001 |
| Constitutional Affairs spokesperson, including Scotland and Wales | Rt Hon. Michael Ancram QC MP | 1997–1998 |
| Constitutional Affairs spokesperson, including Scotland and Wales | Dr Liam Fox MP | 1998–1999 |
| Constitutional Affairs spokesperson, including Scotland and Wales | Rt Hon. Sir George Young Bt MP | 1999–2000 |
| Constitutional Affairs spokesperson, including Scotland and Wales | Mrs Angela Browning MP | 2000–2001 |
| Shadow Minister of Agriculture, Fisheries and Food | Rt Hon. David Curry MP | 1997 |
| Shadow Minister of Agriculture, Fisheries and Food | Rt Hon. Michael Jack MP | 1997–1998 |
| Shadow Minister of Agriculture, Fisheries and Food | Tim Yeo MP | 1998–2001 |
| Shadow Secretary of State for International Development | Rt Hon. Alastair Goodlad MP | 1997–1998 |
| Shadow Secretary of State for International Development | Gary Streeter MP | 1998–2001 |
| Shadow Chief Secretary to the Treasury | Rt Hon. David Heathcoat-Amory MP | 1997–2000 |
| Shadow Chief Secretary to the Treasury | Rt Hon. Oliver Letwin MP | 2000–2001 |
| Shadow Secretary of State for Culture, Media and Sport | Rt Hon. Francis Maude MP | 1997–1998 |
| Shadow Secretary of State for Culture, Media and Sport | Peter Ainsworth MP | 1998–2001 |
| Shadow Secretary of State for Northern Ireland | Rt Hon. Andrew Mackay MP | 1997–2001 |
| Shadow Secretary of State for Health | John Maples MP | 1997–1998 |
| Shadow Secretary of State for Health | Rt Hon. Ann Widdecombe MP | 1998–1999 |
| Shadow Secretary of State for Health | Tim Yeo MP | 1999–2003 |
| Shadow Secretary of State for Social Security | Rt Hon. Iain Duncan Smith MP | 1997–1999 |
| Shadow Secretary of State for Social Security | David Willetts MP | 1999–2005 |
| Shadow Attorney General | Edward Garnier MP | 1997–2001 |

== Initial Shadow Cabinet ==
- Rt Hon. William Hague MP — Leader of Her Majesty's Loyal Opposition and Leader of the Conservative Party
- Rt Hon. Peter Lilley MP — Shadow Chancellor of the Exchequer
- Rt Hon. Michael Howard QC MP — Shadow Foreign Secretary
- Rt Hon. Sir Brian Mawhinney MP — Shadow Home Secretary
- Rt Hon. Cecil Parkinson, Lord Parkinson PC — Chairman of the Conservative Party
- Rt Hon. Stephen Dorrell MP — Shadow Secretary of State for Education and Employment
- Rt Hon. Gillian Shephard MP — Shadow Leader of the House of Commons and Shadow Chancellor of the Duchy of Lancaster
- Rt Hon. Viscount Cranborne PC — Leader of the Opposition in the House of Lords
- Rt Hon. Sir George Young Bt MP — Shadow Secretary of State for Defence
- Rt Hon. John Redwood MP — Shadow Secretary of State for Trade and Industry
- Rt Hon. Sir Norman Fowler MP — Shadow Secretary of State for the Environment, Transport and the Regions
- Rt Hon. Michael Ancram QC MP — Constitutional Affairs spokesperson, including Scotland and Wales
- Rt Hon. David Curry MP — Shadow Minister of Agriculture, Fisheries and Food
- Rt Hon. Alastair Goodlad MP — Shadow Secretary of State for International Development
- Rt Hon. David Heathcoat-Amory MP — Shadow Chief Secretary to the Treasury
- Rt Hon. Francis Maude MP — Shadow Secretary of State for Culture, Media and Sport
- Andrew Mackay MP — Shadow Secretary of State for Northern Ireland
- John Maples MP — Shadow Secretary of State for Health
- Iain Duncan Smith MP — Shadow Secretary of State for Social Security
- James Arbuthnot MP — Opposition Chief Whip
- Rt Hon. Thomas Galbraith, Lord Strathclyde PC — Opposition Chief Whip in the House of Lords

== June 1998 reshuffle ==
Hague first reshuffled the Shadow Cabinet on 1 June 1998.

- Rt Hon. William Hague MP — Leader of Her Majesty's Loyal Opposition and Leader of the Conservative Party
- Rt Hon. Peter Lilley MP — Deputy Leader of the Conservative Party
- Rt Hon. Francis Maude MP — Shadow Chancellor of the Exchequer
- Rt Hon. Michael Howard QC MP — Shadow Foreign Secretary
- Rt Hon. Sir Norman Fowler MP — Shadow Home Secretary
- Rt Hon. Cecil Parkinson, Lord Parkinson PC — Chairman of the Conservative Party
- Rt Hon. Michael Ancram MP — Vice-Chairman of the Conservative Party
- David Willetts MP — Shadow Secretary of State for Education and Employment
- Rt Hon. Sir George Young Bt MP — Shadow Leader of the House of Commons and Shadow Chancellor of the Duchy of Lancaster
- Rt Hon. Viscount Cranborne PC — Leader of the Opposition in the House of Lords
- John Maples MP — Shadow Secretary of State for Defence
- Rt Hon. John Redwood MP — Shadow Secretary of State for Trade and Industry
- Rt Hon. Gillian Shephard MP — Shadow Secretary of State for the Environment, Transport and the Regions
- Dr Liam Fox MP — Constitutional Affairs spokesperson
- Rt Hon Michael Jack MP — Shadow Minister of Agriculture, Fisheries and Food
- Gary Streeter MP — Shadow Secretary of State for International Development
- Rt Hon. David Heathcoat-Amory MP — Shadow Chief Secretary to the Treasury
- Peter Ainsworth MP — Shadow Secretary of State for Culture, Media and Sport
- Rt Hon. Andrew Mackay MP — Shadow Secretary of State for Northern Ireland
- Rt Hon. Ann Widdecombe MP — Shadow Secretary of State for Health
- Iain Duncan Smith MP — Shadow Secretary of State for Social Security
- Rt Hon. James Arbuthnot MP — Opposition Chief Whip
- Rt Hon. Thomas Galbraith, Lord Strathclyde PC — Opposition Chief Whip in the House of Lords

Junior Shadow Ministers

- Edward Garnier — Shadow Attorney General
- Rt Hon Christopher Prout, Lord Kingsland QC — Shadow Lord Chancellor

Changes from June 1997

- Peter Lilley moves from Shadow Chancellor of the Exchequer to Deputy Leader of the Conservative Party
- Francis Maude moves from Shadow Secretary of State for Culture, Media and Sport to Shadow Chancellor of the Exchequer
- Sir Brian Mawhinney leaves the Shadow Cabinet
- Sir Norman Fowler moves from Shadow Secretary of State for the Environment, Transport and the Regions to Shadow Home Secretary
- Gillian Shephard moves from Shadow Leader of the House of Commons to Shadow Secretary of State for the Environment, Transport and the Regions
- Sir George Young moves from Shadow Secretary of State for Defence to Shadow Leader of the House of Commons
- John Maples moves from Shadow Secretary of State for Health to Shadow Secretary of State for Defence
- Ann Widdecombe enters the Shadow Cabinet as Shadow Secretary of State for Health
- Alastair Goodlad leaves the Shadow Cabinet
- Peter Ainsworth enters the Shadow Cabinet as Shadow Secretary of State for Culture, Media and Sport
- Liam Fox enters the Shadow Cabinet as Constitutional Affairs spokesperson
- Gary Streeter enters the Shadow Cabinet as Shadow Secretary of State for International Development
- David Curry leaves the Shadow Cabinet
- Michael Ancram becomes Vice-Chairman of the Conservative Party. A few months later he succeeded Parkinson with his own successor not sitting in the Shadow Cabinet.
- Stephen Dorrell leaves the Shadow Cabinet.

== December 1998 ==
A minor Shadow Cabinet reshuffle was required on 2 December 1998, due to the sacking of Viscount Cranborne over the House of Lords Act 1999. Cranborne had been engaged in secret negotiations with the Labour Government over the issue of hereditary peers, without informing William Hague. This amendment (proposed by Bernard Weatherill for issues of formality, known as the Weatherill Amendment) allowed 92 hereditary peers to remain. The sacking of Cranborne led to a leadership crisis, with some Conservative peers resigning the party whip.

=== Shadow Cabinet ===
- Rt Hon. William Hague MP — Leader of Her Majesty's Loyal Opposition and Leader of the Conservative Party
- Rt Hon. Peter Lilley MP — Deputy Leader of the Conservative Party
- Rt Hon. Francis Maude MP — Shadow Chancellor of the Exchequer
- Rt Hon. Michael Howard QC MP — Shadow Foreign Secretary
- Rt Hon. Sir Norman Fowler MP — Shadow Home Secretary
- Michael Ancram MP — Chairman of the Conservative Party
- David Willetts MP — Shadow Secretary of State for Education and Employment
- Rt Hon. Sir George Young Bt MP — Shadow Leader of the House of Commons and Shadow Chancellor of the Duchy of Lancaster
- Rt Hon. Thomas Galbraith, Lord Strathclyde PC — Leader of the Opposition in the House of Lords
- John Maples MP — Shadow Secretary of State for Defence
- Rt Hon. John Redwood MP — Shadow Secretary of State for Trade and Industry
- Rt Hon. Gillian Shephard MP — Shadow Secretary of State for the Environment, Transport and the Regions
- Dr Liam Fox MP — Constitutional Affairs spokesperson
- Tim Yeo MP — Shadow Minister of Agriculture, Fisheries and Food
- Gary Streeter MP — Shadow Secretary of State for International Development
- Rt Hon. David Heathcoat-Amory MP — Shadow Chief Secretary to the Treasury
- Peter Ainsworth MP — Shadow Secretary of State for Culture, Media and Sport
- Rt Hon. Andrew Mackay MP — Shadow Secretary of State for Northern Ireland
- Rt Hon. Ann Widdecombe MP — Shadow Secretary of State for Health
- Iain Duncan Smith MP — Shadow Secretary of State for Social Security
- Rt Hon. James Arbuthnot MP — Opposition Chief Whip
- Oliver Eden, Lord Henley — Opposition Chief Whip in the House of Lords

Changes

- Rt Hon. Viscount Cranborne PC is sacked from the Shadow Cabinet
- Rt Hon. Thomas Galbraith, Lord Strathclyde PC moves from Opposition Chief Whip in the House of Lords to Leader of the Opposition in the House of Lords
- Oliver Eden, Lord Henley enters the Shadow Cabinet as Opposition Chief Whip in the House of Lords
- Cecil Lord Parkinson leaves the Shadow Cabinet
- Michael Ancram MP appointed Chairman of the Conservative Party

== 1999 reshuffle ==
Hague again reshuffled the Shadow Cabinet on 15 June 1999.

- Rt Hon. William Hague MP — Leader of Her Majesty's Loyal Opposition and Leader of the Conservative Party
- Rt Hon. Francis Maude MP — Shadow Chancellor of the Exchequer
- John Maples MP — Shadow Foreign Secretary
- Rt Hon. Ann Widdecombe MP — Shadow Home Secretary
- Rt Hon. Michael Ancram QC MP — Chairman of the Conservative Party
- Theresa May MP — Shadow Secretary of State for Education and Employment
- Rt Hon. Sir George Young Bt MP — Shadow Leader of the House of Commons, Shadow Chancellor of the Duchy of Lancaster and Constitutional Affairs spokesperson
- Rt Hon. Thomas Galbraith, Lord Strathclyde PC — Leader of the Opposition in the House of Lords
- Iain Duncan Smith MP — Shadow Secretary of State for Defence
- Angela Browning MP — Shadow Secretary of State for Trade and Industry
- Rt Hon. John Redwood MP — Shadow Secretary of State for the Environment, Transport and the Regions
- Tim Yeo MP — Shadow Minister of Agriculture, Fisheries and Food
- Gary Streeter MP — Shadow Secretary of State for International Development
- Rt Hon. David Heathcoat-Amory MP — Shadow Chief Secretary to the Treasury
- Peter Ainsworth MP — Shadow Secretary of State for Culture, Media and Sport
- Rt Hon. Andrew Mackay MP — Shadow Secretary of State for Northern Ireland
- Dr Liam Fox MP — Shadow Secretary of State for Health
- David Willetts MP — Shadow Secretary of State for Social Security
- Rt Hon. James Arbuthnot MP — Opposition Chief Whip
- Oliver Eden, Lord Henley — Opposition Chief Whip in the House of Lords

Junior Shadow Ministers

- Edward Garnier QC MP — Shadow Attorney General
- Rt Hon Christopher Prout, Lord Kingsland QC — Shadow Lord Chancellor
- Bernard Jenkin MP — Shadow Minister for Transport
- Andrew Lansley MP — Shadow Cabinet Office Minister

Changes from 2 December 1998

- Peter Lilley leaves the Shadow Cabinet
- Michael Howard leaves the Shadow Cabinet
- Gillian Shephard leaves the Shadow Cabinet
- Sir Norman Fowler leaves the Shadow Cabinet
- Sir Nicholas Lyell leaves the Shadow Ministerial Team
- Theresa May enters the Shadow Cabinet as Shadow Secretary of State for Education and Employment
- Angela Browning enters the Shadow Cabinet as Shadow Secretary of State for Trade and Industry
- Edward Garnier enters the Shadow Ministerial Team as Shadow Attorney General
- Bernard Jenkin enters the Shadow Ministerial Team as Shadow Transport Minister
- Andrew Lansley enters the Shadow Ministerial Team as Shadow Cabinet Office Minister
- Ann Widdecombe moves from Shadow Secretary of State for Health to Shadow Home Secretary
- John Maples moves from Shadow Secretary of State for Defence to Shadow Secretary of State for Foreign and Commonwealth Affairs
- John Redwood moves from Shadow Secretary of State for Trade and Industry to Shadow Secretary of State for the Environment, Transport and the Regions
- Liam Fox moves from Constitutional Affairs spokesperson to Shadow Secretary of State for Health
- Iain Duncan Smith moves from Shadow Secretary of State for Social Security to Shadow Secretary of State for Defence
- David Willetts moves from Shadow Secretary of State for Education and Employment to Shadow Secretary of State for Social Security

== February 2000 reshuffle ==
On 2 February 2000, Hague again reshuffled the Shadow Cabinet.

- Rt Hon. William Hague MP — Leader of Her Majesty's Loyal Opposition and Leader of the Conservative Party
- Rt Hon. Michael Portillo MP — Shadow Chancellor of the Exchequer
- Rt Hon. Francis Maude MP — Shadow Foreign Secretary
- Rt Hon. Ann Widdecombe MP — Shadow Home Secretary
- Rt Hon. Michael Ancram QC MP — Chairman of the Conservative Party
- Theresa May MP — Shadow Secretary of State for Education and Employment
- Rt Hon. Sir George Young Bt MP — Shadow Leader of the House of Commons, Shadow Chancellor of the Duchy of Lancaster and Constitutional Affairs spokesperson
- Rt Hon. Thomas Galbraith, Lord Strathclyde PC — Leader of the Opposition in the House of Lords
- Iain Duncan Smith MP — Shadow Secretary of State for Defence
- Angela Browning MP — Shadow Secretary of State for Trade and Industry
- Archie Norman MP — Shadow Secretary of State for the Environment, Transport and the Regions
- Tim Yeo MP — Shadow Minister of Agriculture, Fisheries and Food
- Gary Streeter MP — Shadow Secretary of State for International Development
- Rt Hon. David Heathcoat-Amory MP — Shadow Chief Secretary to the Treasury
- Peter Ainsworth MP — Shadow Secretary of State for Culture, Media and Sport
- Rt Hon. Andrew Mackay MP — Shadow Secretary of State for Northern Ireland
- Dr Liam Fox MP — Shadow Secretary of State for Health
- David Willetts MP — Shadow Secretary of State for Social Security
- Rt Hon. James Arbuthnot MP — Opposition Chief Whip
- Oliver Eden, Lord Henley — Opposition Chief Whip in the House of Lords

Junior Shadow Ministers

- Edward Garnier QC MP — Shadow Attorney General
- Rt Hon Christopher Prout, Lord Kingsland QC — Shadow Lord Chancellor
- Bernard Jenkin MP — Shadow Minister for Transport
- Andrew Lansley CBE MP — Shadow Cabinet Office Minister

Changes from 15 June 1999

- John Redwood leaves the Shadow Cabinet
- John Maples leaves the Shadow Cabinet
- Michael Portillo enters the Shadow Cabinet as Shadow Chancellor of the Exchequer
- Archie Norman enters the Shadow Cabinet as Shadow Secretary of State for the Environment, Transport and the Regions
- Francis Maude moves from Shadow Chancellor of the Exchequer to Shadow Foreign Secretary

== September 2000 reshuffle ==
Hague's final Shadow Cabinet reshuffle occurred on 26 September 2000.

- Rt Hon. William Hague MP — Leader of Her Majesty's Loyal Opposition and Leader of the Conservative Party
- Rt Hon. Michael Portillo MP — Shadow Chancellor of the Exchequer
- Rt Hon. Francis Maude MP — Shadow Foreign Secretary
- Rt Hon. Ann Widdecombe MP — Shadow Home Secretary
- Rt Hon. Michael Ancram QC MP — Chairman of the Conservative Party
- Theresa May MP — Shadow Secretary of State for Education and Employment
- Mrs Angela Browning MP — Shadow Leader of the House of Commons, Shadow Chancellor of the Duchy of Lancaster and Constitutional Affairs spokesperson
- Rt Hon. Thomas Galbraith, Lord Strathclyde PC — Leader of the Opposition in the House of Lords
- Iain Duncan Smith MP — Shadow Secretary of State for Defence
- Rt Hon. David Heathcoat-Amory MP — Shadow Secretary of State for Trade and Industry
- Archie Norman MP — Shadow Secretary of State for the Environment, Transport and the Regions
- Tim Yeo MP — Shadow Minister of Agriculture, Fisheries and Food
- Gary Streeter MP — Shadow Secretary of State for International Development
- Rt Hon. Oliver Letwin MP — Shadow Chief Secretary to the Treasury
- Peter Ainsworth MP — Shadow Secretary of State for Culture, Media and Sport
- Rt Hon. Andrew Mackay MP — Shadow Secretary of State for Northern Ireland
- Dr Liam Fox MP — Shadow Secretary of State for Health
- David Willetts MP — Shadow Secretary of State for Social Security
- Rt Hon. James Arbuthnot MP — Opposition Chief Whip
- Oliver Eden, Lord Henley — Opposition Chief Whip in the House of Lords

Junior Shadow Ministers

- Edward Garnier QC MP — Shadow Attorney General
- Rt Hon Christopher Prout, Lord Kingsland QC — Shadow Lord Chancellor
- Bernard Jenkin MP — Shadow Minister for Transport
- Andrew Lansley CBE MP — Shadow Cabinet Office Minister

Changes from 2 February 2000

- Sir George Young leaves the Shadow Cabinet
- Oliver Letwin enters the Shadow Cabinet as Shadow Chief Secretary to the Treasury
- Angela Browning moves from Shadow Secretary of State for Trade and Industry to Shadow Leader of the House of Commons, Shadow Chancellor of the Duchy of Lancaster and Constitutional Affairs spokesperson
- David Heathcoat-Amory moves from Shadow Chief Secretary to the Treasury to Shadow Secretary of State for Trade and Industry
