= Second Heath shadow cabinet =

Second Heath Shadow Cabinet
- Shadow Cabinet of United Kingdom
- 1974 – 1975
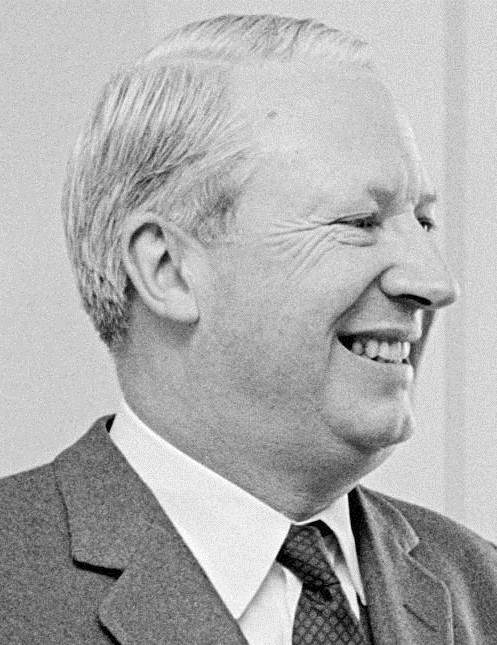
- Date formed: 4 March 1974
- Date dissolved: 11 February 1975

People and organisations
- Monarch: Elizabeth II
- Leader of the Opposition: Edward Heath
- Member party: Conservative Party
- Status in legislature: Official Opposition

History
- Outgoing formation: 1975 Conservative Party leadership election
- Election: February 1974 United Kingdom general election
- Legislature terms: 46th UK Parliament; 47th UK Parliament
- Predecessor: Second Wilson shadow cabinet
- Successor: Thatcher shadow cabinet

The Second Shadow Cabinet of Edward Heath was created after the Conservative Party lost the February 1974 general election. It was led by the Leader of the Conservative Party Edward Heath and featured prominent Conservative politicians both past and future. Included was Heath's successor Margaret Thatcher, the future Home Secretary William Whitelaw, and two future Foreign Secretaries, Lord Carrington and Francis Pym.

== History ==
For the first time in history, a leadership election was held in 1975 for the Conservative Party whilst the position was not vacant. Margaret Thatcher challenged Heath, with whom the majority of the party was dissatisfied because of repeated losses at elections. She won, becoming the first female leader of a major political party in Britain.

== Shadow cabinet list ==
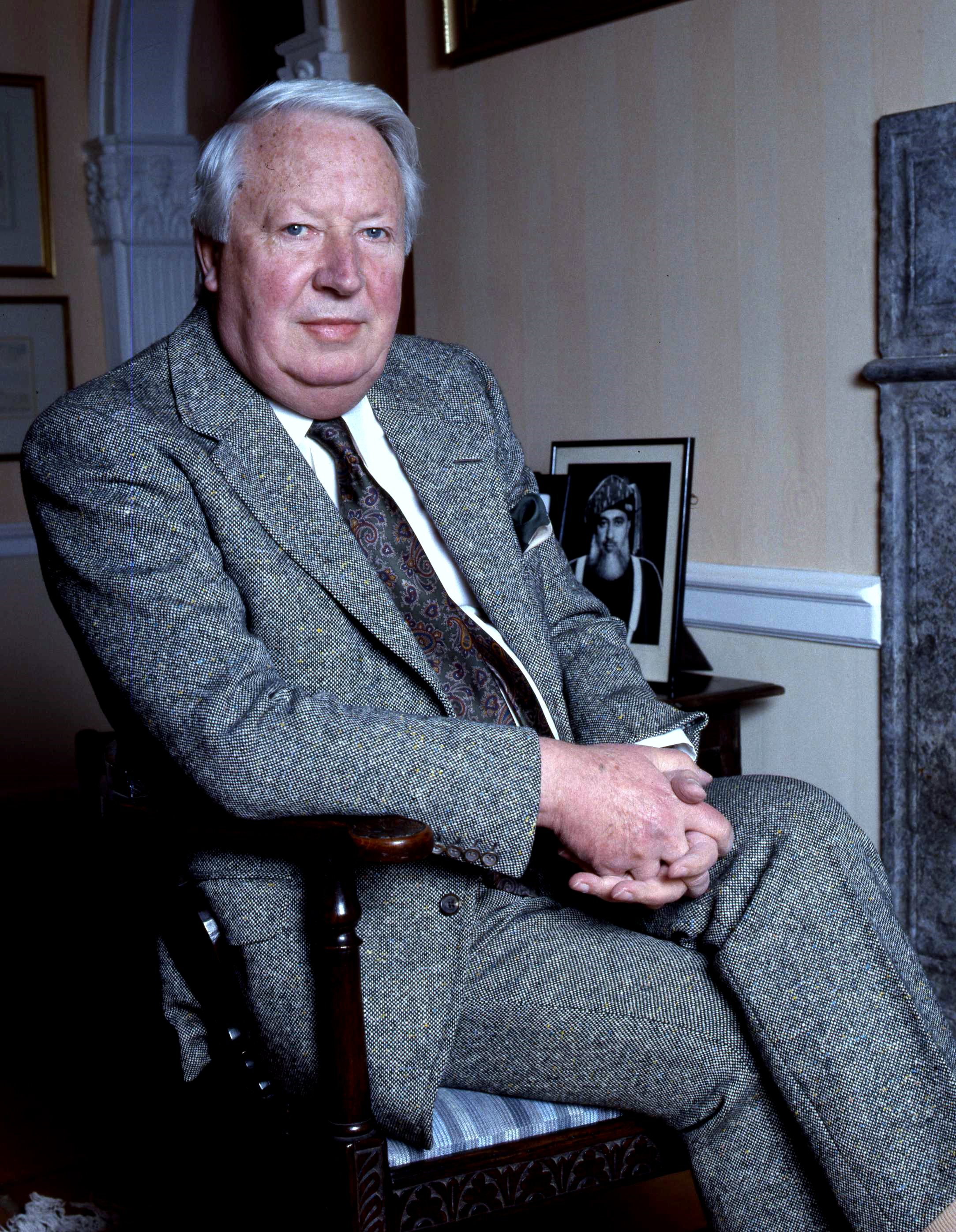
Edward Heath, Leader of the Opposition 1974-1975

Portfolio	Shadow Minister	Term
Leader of Her Majesty's Most Loyal Opposition; Leader of the Conservative Party	The Rt Hon. Edward Heath MP	1974–75
Shadow Chancellor of the Exchequer	The Rt Hon. Robert Carr MP	1974–75
Shadow Foreign Secretary	The Rt Hon. Sir Alec Douglas-Home MP	1974
Shadow Foreign Secretary	The Rt Hon. Geoffrey Rippon MP	1974–75
Shadow Home Secretary	The Rt Hon. Jim Prior MP	1974
Shadow Home Secretary	The Rt Hon. Keith Joseph MP	1974–75
Chairman of the Conservative Party	The Rt Hon. The Lord Carrington PC	1974
Chairman of the Conservative Party	The Rt Hon. William Whitelaw MP	1974–75
Shadow Secretary of State for Employment	The Rt Hon. William Whitelaw MP	1974
Shadow Secretary of State for Employment	The Rt Hon. Jim Prior	1974–75
Shadow Secretary of State for Defence	The Rt Hon. Ian Gilmour MP	1974
Shadow Secretary of State for Defence	The Rt Hon. Peter Walker MP	1974–75
Shadow Secretary of State for the Environment	The Rt Hon. Margaret Thatcher	1974
Shadow Secretary of State for the Environment	Paul Channon MP	1974–75
Shadow Secretary of State for Trade and Industry	The Rt Hon. Peter Walker MP	1974
Shadow Secretary of State for Trade and Industry	The Rt Hon. Michael Heseltine MP	1974–75
Shadow Secretary of State for Consumer Affairs	The Rt Hon. Peter Walker MP	1974
Shadow Secretary of State for Consumer Affairs	Paul Channon MP	1974
Shadow Secretary of State for Consumer Affairs	Timothy Raison MP	1974–75
Shadow Secretary of State for Wales	The Rt Hon. Peter Thomas MP	1974–75
Shadow Minister of Agriculture, Fisheries and Food	The Rt Hon. Francis Pym MP	1974–75
Shadow Secretary of State for Social Services	The Rt Hon. Sir Geoffrey Howe MP	1974–75
Shadow Secretary of State for Energy	The Rt Hon. Patrick Jenkin MP	1974–75
Shadow Secretary of State for Scotland	The Rt Hon. Alick Buchanan-Smith MP	1974–75
Shadow Secretary of State for Education and Science	The Rt Hon. William van Straubenzee MP	1974
Shadow Secretary of State for Education and Science	The Rt Hon. Norman St John-Stevas MP	1974–75
Shadow Leader of the House of Commons	The Rt Hon. Jim Prior MP	1974
Shadow Leader of the House of Commons	The Rt Hon. John Peyton MP	1974–75
Shadow Secretary of State for Northern Ireland	The Rt Hon. Francis Pym MP	1974
Shadow Secretary of State for Northern Ireland	The Rt Hon. Ian Gilmour MP	1974–75
Opposition Chief Whip	The Rt Hon. Humphrey Atkins MP	1974–75
Leader of the Opposition in the House of Lords	The Rt Hon. The Lord Windlesham PC	1974–75
Shadow Chief Secretary to the Treasury	The Rt Hon. Maurice Macmillan MP	1974
Shadow Chief Secretary to the Treasury	David Howell MP	1974
Shadow Chief Secretary to the Treasury	The Rt Hon. Margaret Thatcher MP	1974–75
Shadow Minister for Europe	The Rt Hon. Geoffrey Rippon MP	1974
Shadow Minister for Europe	The Rt Hon. The Lord Carrington PC	1974–75
Shadow Minister without Portfolio	The Rt Hon. The Lord Hailsham of St Marylebone PC	1974–1975
Shadow Minister without Portfolio	The Rt Hon. Keith Joseph MP	1974
Shadow Minister without Portfolio	The Rt Hon. Anthony Barber MP	1974

== Initial Shadow Cabinet ==
Heath announced his new Shadow Cabinet on 12 March 1974.

- Edward Heath – Leader of Her Majesty's Most Loyal Opposition and Leader of the Conservative Party
- Alec Douglas-Home – Shadow Foreign Secretary
- William Whitelaw – Shadow Secretary of State for Employment
- Robert Carr – Shadow Chancellor of the Exchequer
- Jim Prior – Shadow Home Secretary
- Margaret Thatcher – Shadow Secretary of State for the Environment
- Peter Walker – Shadow Secretary of State for Industry, Trade and Consumer Affairs
- Peter Thomas – Shadow Secretary of State for Wales
- Francis Pym – Shadow Minister of Agriculture, Fisheries and Food and Shadow Secretary of State for Northern Ireland
- Ian Gilmour – Shadow Secretary of State for Defence
- Geoffrey Howe – Shadow Secretary of State for Social Services
- Patrick Jenkin – Shadow Secretary of State for Energy
- Alick Buchanan-Smith – Shadow Secretary of State for Scotland
- William van Straubenzee – Shadow Secretary of State for Education and Science
- The Lord Windlesham – Leader of the Opposition in the House of Lords
- The Lord Carrington - Chairman of the Conservative Party
- Maurice Macmillan – Shadow Chief Secretary to the Treasury
- Geoffrey Rippon – Shadow Minister for Europe
- The Lord Hailsham of St Marylebone, Keith Joseph and Anthony Barber – Shadow Minister without Portfolio
- Humphrey Atkins – Opposition Chief Whip

== June 1974 reshuffle ==
On 13 June 1974, a reshuffle saw Peter Carington replaced as party chair by William Whitelaw which coincided with Macmillan and Barber returning to the backbench.

- Edward Heath – Leader of Her Majesty's Most Loyal Opposition and Leader of the Conservative Party
- Alec Douglas-Home – Shadow Foreign Secretary
- William Whitelaw – Chairman of the Conservative Party
- Robert Carr – Shadow Chancellor of the Exchequer
- Keith Joseph – Shadow Home Secretary
- Jim Prior – Shadow Secretary of State for Employment
- Margaret Thatcher – Shadow Secretary of State for the Environment
- Peter Walker – Shadow Secretary of State for Industry, Trade and Consumer Affairs
- Peter Thomas – Shadow Secretary of State for Wales
- Francis Pym – Shadow Minister of Agriculture, Fisheries and Food
- Ian Gilmour – Shadow Secretary of State for Defence
- Geoffrey Howe – Shadow Secretary of State for Social Services
- Patrick Jenkin – Shadow Secretary of State for Energy
- Alick Buchanan-Smith – Shadow Secretary of State for Scotland
- William van Straubenzee – Shadow Secretary of State for Education and Science
- The Lord Windlesham – Leader of the Opposition in the House of Lords
- David Howell – Shadow Chief Secretary to the Treasury
- Geoffrey Rippon – Shadow Minister for Europe
- The Lord Carrington - Shadow Minister with special responsibility for Britain in the EEC
- The Lord Hailsham of St Marylebone – Shadow Minister without Portfolio
- Humphrey Atkins – Opposition Chief Whip

Changes

- 19 June 1974 - Norman St John-Stevas replaces William van Straubenzee as Shadow Secretary of State for Education and Science, who leaves the Shadow Cabinet. Peter Walker moves to defence, Ian Gilmour to Northern Ireland. Michael Heseltine joines the Shadow Cabinet as Shadow Secretary of State for Trade and Industry and Paul Channon joins at Consumer Affairs.
- August 1974 - Alec Douglas-Home steps down as Shadow Foreign Secretary and is replaced by Geoffrey Rippon

== November 1974 reshuffle ==
Following the October 1974 general election Heath reshuffled his Shadow Cabinet on 7 November 1974.

- Edward Heath – Leader of Her Majesty's Most Loyal Opposition and Leader of the Conservative Party
- Robert Carr – Shadow Chancellor of the Exchequer
- Keith Joseph – Shadow Home Secretary
- Geoffrey Rippon – Shadow Foreign Secretary
- William Whitelaw – Chairman of the Conservative Party
- Jim Prior – Shadow Secretary of State for Employment
- Paul Channon – Shadow Secretary of State for the Environment
- Michael Heseltine – Shadow Secretary of State for Trade and Industry
- Peter Thomas – Shadow Secretary of State for Wales
- Francis Pym – Shadow Minister of Agriculture, Fisheries and Food
- Peter Walker – Shadow Secretary of State for Defence
- Geoffrey Howe – Shadow Secretary of State for Social Services
- Patrick Jenkin – Shadow Secretary of State for Energy
- Alick Buchanan-Smith – Shadow Secretary of State for Scotland
- Norman St John-Stevas – Shadow Secretary of State for Education and Science
- The Lord Windlesham – Leader of the Opposition in the House of Lords
- Margaret Thatcher – Shadow Chief Secretary to the Treasury
- Timothy Raison – Shadow Secretary of State for Consumer Affairs
- Ian Gilmour – Shadow Secretary of State for Northern Ireland
- The Lord Carrington – Shadow Minister for Europe
- The Lord Hailsham of St Marylebone – Shadow Minister without Portfolio
- Humphrey Atkins – Opposition Chief Whip
