= Thatcher shadow cabinet =

Former Shadow Cabinet of the United Kingdom

Thatcher Shadow Cabinet
- Shadow Cabinet of the United Kingdom
- 1975 – 1979
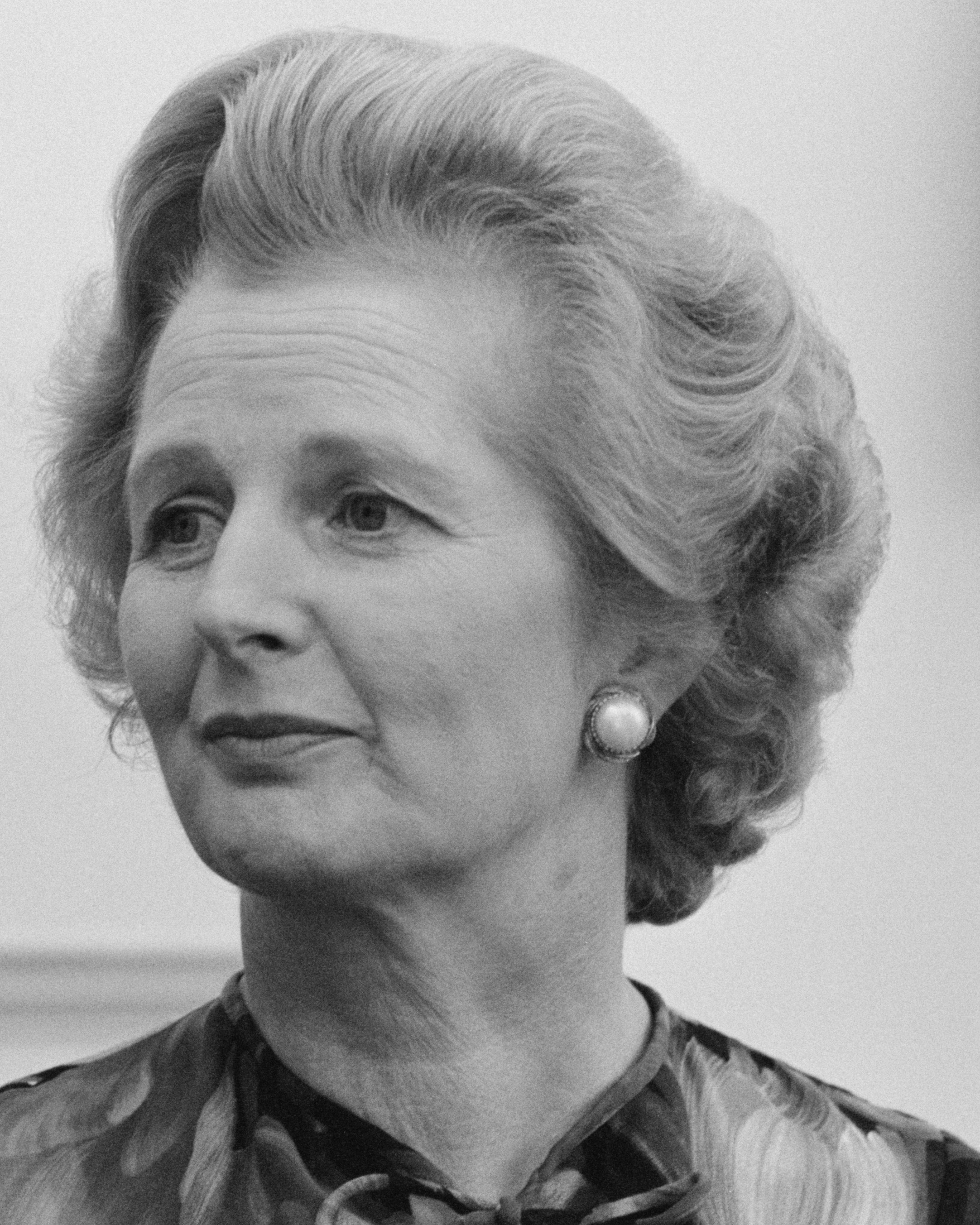
- Date formed: 11 February 1975
- Date dissolved: 4 May 1979

People and organisations
- Monarch: Elizabeth II
- Leader of the Opposition: Margaret Thatcher
- Deputy Leader of the Opposition: William Whitelaw
- Member party: Conservative Party
- Status in legislature: Official Opposition

History
- Election: 1975 Conservative Party leadership election
- Legislature terms: 47th UK Parliament
- Predecessor: Second Heath shadow cabinet
- Successor: Callaghan shadow cabinet

Margaret Thatcher became the first female Leader of the Conservative Party and Leader of the Opposition after winning the 1975 leadership election, the first Conservative leadership election where the post was not vacant. A rule change to enable the election was largely prompted by dissatisfaction with the incumbent leader, Edward Heath, who had lost three of four general elections as leader, including two in 1974. After announcing her first Shadow Cabinet in February 1975, she reshuffled it twice: in January and November 1976. Minor subsequent changes were necessary to respond to various circumstances. Thatcher's Shadow Cabinet ceased to exist upon her becoming Prime Minister following the 1979 general election.

== Shadow Cabinet list ==
Portfolio	Shadow Minister	Term
Leader of Her Majesty's Most Loyal Opposition; Leader of the Conservative Party	The Rt Hon. Margaret Thatcher MP	1975–1979
Deputy Leader of the Opposition; Deputy Leader of the Conservative Party	The Rt Hon. William Whitelaw MP	1975–1979
Shadow Minister responsible for Devolution	The Rt Hon. William Whitelaw MP	1975–1979
Shadow Minister responsible for Devolution	The Rt Hon. Francis Pym MP	1976–?
Shadow Minister with responsibility for policy formation and research	The Rt Hon. Sir Keith Joseph, Bt MP	1975–1979
Shadow Minister without Portfolio	The Rt Hon. The Lord Hailsham of St Marylebone PC	1975–1979
Shadow Foreign Secretary	The Rt Hon. Reginald Maudling MP	1975–1976
Shadow Foreign Secretary	The Rt Hon. John Davies MP	1976–1978
Shadow Foreign Secretary	The Rt Hon. Francis Pym MP	1978–1979
Shadow Chancellor of the Exchequer	The Rt Hon. Geoffrey Howe MP	1975–1979
Shadow Home Secretary	The Rt Hon. Ian Gilmour MP	1975–1976
Shadow Home Secretary	The Rt Hon. William Whitelaw MP	1976–1979
Leader of the Opposition in the House of Lords	The Rt Hon. The Lord Carrington PC	1975–1979
Shadow Secretary of State for Employment	The Rt Hon. Jim Prior MP	1975–1979
Shadow Minister of Agriculture, Fisheries and Food	The Rt Hon. Francis Pym MP	1975 & 1976
Shadow Minister of Agriculture, Fisheries and Food	Michael Jopling MP	1975–1976
Shadow Minister of Agriculture, Fisheries and Food	The Rt Hon. John Peyton MP	1976–1979
Shadow Secretary of State for Energy	The Rt Hon. Patrick Jenkin MP	1975–1976
Shadow Secretary of State for Energy	John Biffen MP	1976
Shadow Secretary of State for Energy	Tom King MP	1976–1979
Shadow Leader of the House of Commons	The Rt Hon. John Peyton MP	1975–1976
Shadow Leader of the House of Commons	The Rt Hon. Francis Pym MP	1976–1978
Shadow Leader of the House of Commons	Norman St John-Stevas MP	1978–1979
Shadow Secretary of State for Education and Science	Norman St John-Stevas MP	1975–1978
Shadow Secretary of State for Education and Science	Mark Carlisle MP	1978–1979
Shadow Minister for the Arts	Norman St John-Stevas MP	1975–1979
Shadow Secretary of State for Industry	Michael Heseltine MP	1975–1976
Shadow Secretary of State for Industry	John Biffen MP	1976–1979
Shadow Secretary of State for the Environment	Timothy Raison MP	1975–1976
Shadow Secretary of State for the Environment	Michael Heseltine MP	1976–1979
Shadow Secretary of State for Scotland	Alick Buchanan-Smith MP	1975–1976
Shadow Secretary of State for Scotland	Teddy Taylor MP	1976–1979
Shadow Secretary of State for Wales	Nicholas Edwards MP	1975–1979
Shadow Secretary of State for Northern Ireland	Airey Neave MP	1975–1979
Shadow Secretary of State for Defence	The Hon. George Younger MP	1975–1976
Shadow Secretary of State for Defence	The Rt Hon. Ian Gilmour MP	1976–1979
Shadow Secretary of State for Health and Social Care	Norman Fowler MP	1975–1976
Shadow Secretary of State for Health and Social Care	The Rt Hon. Patrick Jenkin MP	1976–1979
Shadow Secretary of State for Prices and Consumer Protection	Sally Oppenheim MP	1975–1979
Opposition Chief Whip in the House of Commons	The Rt Hon. Humphrey Atkins MP	1975–1979
Opposition Chief Whip in the House of Lords	The Rt Hon. The Lord St Aldwyn PC	1975–1978
Opposition Chief Whip in the House of Lords	The Lord Denham	1978–1979
Shadow Attorney General	The Rt Hon. Sir Michael Havers MP	1975–1979

== Initial Shadow Cabinet ==
Thatcher announced her first Shadow Cabinet on 18 February 1975.

- Margaret Thatcher – Leader of Her Majesty's Most Loyal Opposition and Leader of the Conservative Party
- William Whitelaw – Deputy Leader of the Opposition, Deputy Leader of the Conservative Party and Shadow Minister responsible for Devolution
- Keith Joseph – Shadow Minister with responsibility for policy formation and research
- Lord Hailsham of St Marylebone – Shadow Minister without Portfolio
- Reginald Maudling – Shadow Foreign Secretary
- Geoffrey Howe – Shadow Chancellor of the Exchequer
- Ian Gilmour – Shadow Home Secretary
- Lord Carrington – Leader of the Opposition in the House of Lords
- Jim Prior – Shadow Secretary of State for Employment
- Francis Pym – Shadow Minister of Agriculture, Fisheries and Food
- Patrick Jenkin – Shadow Secretary of State for Energy
- John Peyton – Shadow Leader of the House of Commons
- Norman St John-Stevas – Shadow Secretary of State for Education and Science and Shadow Minister for the Arts
- Michael Heseltine – Shadow Secretary of State for Industry
- Timothy Raison – Shadow Secretary of State for the Environment
- Alick Buchanan-Smith – Shadow Secretary of State for Scotland
- Nicholas Edwards – Shadow Secretary of State for Wales
- Airey Neave – Shadow Secretary of State for Northern Ireland
- George Younger – Shadow Secretary of State for Defence
- Norman Fowler – Shadow Secretary of State for Health
- Sally Oppenheim – Shadow Secretary of State for Prices and Consumer Protection
- Humphrey Atkins – Opposition Chief Whip in the House of Commons
- Lord St Aldwyn – Opposition Chief Whip in the House of Lords
- Sir Michael Havers – Shadow Attorney General

Changes

- April 1975: Due to illness, Pym was replaced as Shadow Agriculture Minister by Michael Jopling.

== January 1976 reshuffle ==
On 15 January 1976, Thatcher reshuffled the Shadow Cabinet. Pym returned as Shadow Agriculture Minister, displacing Jopling. George Younger was dropped from the front bench, and he was replaced by Gilmour at Defence; Whitelaw, the Deputy Leader, added Gilmour's Home Affairs portfolio to his Devolution. John Biffen replaced Jenkin as Shadow Energy Secretary, and Jenkin took Health from Fowler, who was demoted to be a Shadow Transport Minister (which was not in Shadow Cabinet and was part of the Environment team).

- Margaret Thatcher – Leader of Her Majesty's Most Loyal Opposition and Leader of the Conservative Party
- William Whitelaw – Deputy Leader of the Opposition, Deputy Leader of the Conservative Party, Shadow Home Secretary and Shadow Minister responsible for Devolution
- Keith Joseph – Shadow Minister with responsibility for policy formation and research
- Lord Hailsham of St Marylebone – Shadow Minister without Portfolio
- Reginald Maudling – Shadow Foreign Secretary
- Geoffrey Howe – Shadow Chancellor of the Exchequer
- Ian Gilmour – Shadow Secretary of State for Defence
- Lord Carrington – Leader of the Opposition in the House of Lords
- Jim Prior – Shadow Secretary of State for Employment
- Francis Pym – Shadow Minister of Agriculture, Fisheries and Food
- John Biffen – Shadow Secretary of State for Energy
- John Peyton – Shadow Leader of the House of Commons
- Norman St John-Stevas – Shadow Secretary of State for Education and Science
  Shadow Minister for the Arts
- Michael Heseltine – Shadow Secretary of State for Industry
- Timothy Raison – Shadow Secretary of State for the Environment
- Alick Buchanan-Smith – Shadow Secretary of State for Scotland
- Nicholas Edwards – Shadow Secretary of State for Wales
- Airey Neave – Shadow Secretary of State for Northern Ireland
- Patrick Jenkin – Shadow Secretary of State for Health
- Sally Oppenheim – Shadow Secretary of State for Prices and Consumer Protection
- Humphrey Atkins – Opposition Chief Whip in the House of Commons
- Lord St Aldwyn – Opposition Chief Whip in the House of Lords
- Sir Michael Havers – Shadow Attorney General

== November 1976 reshuffle ==
On 19 November 1976, Thatcher reshuffled again. Maudling was dropped as Shadow Foreign Secretary and replaced by John Davies. Raison dropped, being replaced at Environment by Heseltine, who was replaced at the Industry portfolio by Biffen. He was in turn replaced as Shadow Energy Secretary by Tom King. Peyton and Pym switch roles (Shadow Leader of the House for Agriculture), with Pym also taking Devolution from Whitelaw.

- Margaret Thatcher – Leader of Her Majesty's Most Loyal Opposition and Leader of the Conservative Party
- William Whitelaw – Deputy Leader of the Opposition, Deputy Leader of the Conservative Party and Shadow Home Secretary
- Keith Joseph – Shadow Minister with responsibility for policy formation and research
- Lord Hailsham of St Marylebone – Shadow Minister without Portfolio
- John Davies – Shadow Foreign Secretary
- Geoffrey Howe – Shadow Chancellor of the Exchequer
- Ian Gilmour – Shadow Secretary of State for Defence
- Lord Carrington – Leader of the Opposition in the House of Lords
- Jim Prior – Shadow Secretary of State for Employment
- John Peyton – Shadow Minister of Agriculture, Fisheries and Food
- Tom King – Shadow Secretary of State for Energy
- Francis Pym – Shadow Leader of the House of Commons and Shadow Minister responsible for Devolution
- Norman St John-Stevas – Shadow Secretary of State for Education and Science and Shadow Minister for the Arts
- John Biffen – Shadow Secretary of State for Industry
- Michael Heseltine – Shadow Secretary of State for the Environment
- Alick Buchanan-Smith – Shadow Secretary of State for Scotland
- Nicholas Edwards – Shadow Secretary of State for Wales
- Airey Neave – Shadow Secretary of State for Northern Ireland
- Patrick Jenkin – Shadow Secretary of State for Health
- Sally Oppenheim – Shadow Secretary of State for Prices and Consumer Protection
- Humphrey Atkins – Opposition Chief Whip in the House of Commons
- Lord St Aldwyn – Opposition Chief Whip in the House of Lords
- Sir Michael Havers – Shadow Attorney General

Changes

- 9 December 1976: Buchanan-Smith is sacked as Shadow Scottish Secretary for failing to adhere to collective responsibility on devolution policy and is replaced by Teddy Taylor, who had been Shadow Trade Secretary, a role that appears not to have belonged to the Shadow Cabinet at this point.
- Approx. 17 January 1978: Lord St Aldwyn retires as Conservative Chief Whip and is replaced by Lord Denham.
- November 1978: On 6 November, John Davies retires from public life after being diagnosed with a brain tumor. Pym is tapped to stand in for him, and is later given the post of Shadow Foreign Secretary full-time. St John-Stevas replaces him Shadow Leader of the House, and Mark Carlisle replaced the latter as Shadow Education Secretary.
- March 1979: Shadow Northern Ireland Secretary Airey Neave is killed by an Irish National Liberation Army car bomb, just over a week before Parliament is dissolved ahead of the 1979 general election.
