= 2003 Conservative Party leadership election =

British Conservative Party leadership election

- 6 November 2003
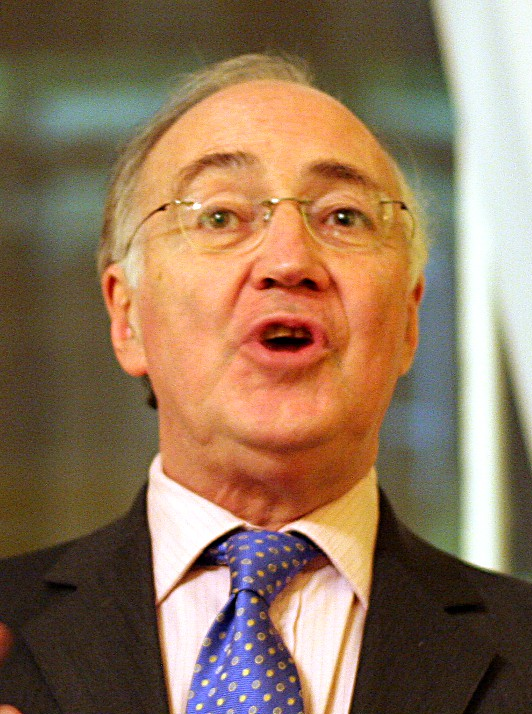
Candidate	Michael Howard
Popular vote	Unopposed
Leader before election
Iain Duncan Smith
Elected Leader
Michael Howard

The 2003 Conservative Party leadership election was held due to the enforced resignation of incumbent leader Iain Duncan Smith, who lost a confidence vote among his parliamentary party. The causes of Duncan Smith's fall are often cited as his lack of charisma and impact with the public, the uninspired direction of the party under his leadership, and his previous failure to achieve more than a third of support among members of parliament in the 2001 leadership contest. In the event, the Conservative Party coalesced around Michael Howard as replacement leader and there was not a contest to replace Duncan Smith.

== Fall of Iain Duncan Smith ==
Duncan Smith's leadership was damaged by his lack of support among many of his MPs and the perception that he was a weak, un-charismatic leader. On 14 February 2003, former MP Barry Legg was selected as Conservative Party Chief Executive. He was from the right of the party and replaced moderniser Mark MacGregor, which led to conflict within the party. On 23 February 2003, The Daily Telegraph published a story that members of parliament were considering a vote of confidence due to Duncan Smith's perceived un-electability. On 1 May 2003, Crispin Blunt resigned from the Conservative front bench and demanded a no confidence motion in Duncan Smith, the day before local government elections. On 7 May, Barry Legg resigned amid continuing disquiet.

On 13 October 2003, the parliamentary watchdog began an investigation into Duncan Smith's past employment of his wife as his diary secretary. There were allegations that she was on the parliamentary payroll for apparently doing no work. On 18 October, backbench MP Patrick Cormack suggested that Duncan Smith should call a vote of confidence in his leadership. On 22 October, major party donor Stuart Wheeler said there was "an overwhelming case" to replace Duncan Smith.

For a vote of confidence to occur, 15 percent of Conservative MPs (at the time, 25 MPs) had to write to the Chairman of the 1922 Committee demanding the vote. On 26 October, amid mounting claims that the threshold of 25 was about to be reached, Duncan Smith made an appearance on television and dared his opponents to show their hand by the evening of 29 October, or to withdraw their challenge. He also stated that he would not step down if a vote were called. On 28 October, Sir Michael Spicer, chairman of the 1922 Committee, announced that he had received at least 25 votes and the vote of no confidence was held on 29 October 2003. Duncan Smith lost the vote 75–90.

== Rise of Michael Howard ==
As soon as the result of the confidence vote was known, MPs David Davis and Oliver Letwin announced that they were supporting former Home Secretary Michael Howard. Kenneth Clarke and Tim Yeo announced they would not be running. Michael Ancram, deputy leader of the party, gave the qualified statement that he would not stand against Howard so long as no other candidate came forward. The prospect of a sole candidate raised many questions as to whether or not ordinary party members would have the opportunity to decide whether they accepted Howard as leader, and some suggested an all-member ballot. No other candidates came forward, and Howard was elected unopposed on 6 November 2003. The board of the Conservative Party decided not to have that ratified by the party membership.
