= 2016 British shadow cabinet resignations =

Event in British politics; three days after the EU referendum in June 2016

On 26–29 June 2016, 21 members of the Shadow Cabinet resigned from the frontbench. Following the Leave result in the referendum on Britain's membership of the European Union, Jeremy Corbyn faced heavy criticism for the perceived reluctance of his involvement in the campaign to Remain and his perceived weakness as leader of the Labour Party.

The first shadow minister to depart the Opposition frontbench was Hilary Benn, the Shadow Foreign Secretary, on 26 June. Over the course of the day, he was joined by 11 other Shadow Cabinet members, all expressing concern with Corbyn's ability to lead the party into the next general election. On the following day, 27 June, a further eight members resigned, including Angela Eagle, the most senior Shadow Secretary of State.

Tom Watson, the deputy party leader, remained in his position while openly criticising Corbyn's leadership. Unlike the other members of the Shadow Cabinet, Watson could not be removed by Corbyn as he had been elected, not appointed. This enabled him to put public pressure on Corbyn to resign.

Corbyn's allies in the Shadow Cabinet (Diane Abbott, John McDonnell, Emily Thornberry and Jon Trickett) all refused to stand down, condemning the actions of their former colleagues as a "coup" against the democratically elected party leader. Andy Burnham, the Shadow Home Secretary and leadership candidate in 2015, also announced that he would not resign, saying that he believed that "civil war" in the party was a bad idea.

In addition, 18 other shadow ministers not in the Shadow Cabinet resigned, including Diana Johnson, Anna Turley, Toby Perkins, Yvonne Fovargue, Alex Cunningham, Steve Reed, Roberta Blackman-Woods, Wayne David, Jenny Chapman, Keir Starmer, Richard Burden, Jack Dromey, Thangam Debbonaire, Susan Elan Jones, Nick Thomas-Symonds, Sharon Hodgson, Melanie Onn, Nic Dakin and 9 Parliamentary private secretaries.

On 27 June, Corbyn announced new appointments to his top team, including promotions for Abbott and Thornberry, and 13 new members. Because few Labour MPs were prepared to support him, Corbyn introduced a number of joint portfolios, such as combining the Scotland and Northern Ireland briefs. He also appointed veteran backbench MP Paul Flynn, who is believed to have become the oldest frontbench spokesperson since William Gladstone, at 81 years of age.

On 28 June, the Parliamentary Labour Party held a motion of no confidence in Corbyn as party leader, which passed overwhelmingly with 172 votes in favour and 40 votes against. On the following day, Pat Glass resigned after two days as Shadow Education Secretary, stating that the situation had become "untenable".

Despite the result of the no-confidence vote, Corbyn claimed that it had "no constitutional legitimacy" and refused to resign. Several high-profile and influential Labour MPs were touted as possible leadership challengers, as Corbyn's opponents tried to find a single candidate to unite around. Eventually two emerged: Angela Eagle and Owen Smith, who launched their leadership campaigns on 11 July and 13 July, respectively. Eagle withdrew from the race and endorsed Smith on 19 July, making him the sole challenger to Corbyn.

Corbyn was re-elected with 313,209 votes, a 61.8% share of the total vote. Following his victory, Corbyn re-shuffled the Shadow Cabinet on 6–7 October, inviting back a few of the former members who had resigned in June. Nia Griffith returned as Shadow Defence Secretary, John Healey as Shadow Housing Secretary and Keir Starmer as Shadow Brexit Secretary.

== List of resignations ==
=== 26 June ===
#	Portrait	MP	Constituency	Office	Notes
1		Hilary Benn	Leeds Central	Shadow Foreign Secretary	Sacked during a phone call in which Benn stated that he had lost confidence in Corbyn's leadership.
2		Heidi Alexander	Lewisham East	Shadow Health Secretary	
3		Gloria De Piero	Ashfield	Shadow Minister for Young People	
4		Ian Murray	Edinburgh South	Shadow Scottish Secretary	
5		Lilian Greenwood	Nottingham South	Shadow Transport Secretary	
6		Lucy Powell	Manchester Central	Shadow Education Secretary	
7		Kerry McCarthy	Bristol East	Shadow Environment Secretary	
8		Seema Malhotra	Feltham and Heston	Shadow Chief Secretary to the Treasury	
9		Vernon Coaker	Gedling	Shadow Northern Ireland Secretary	
10		Lord Falconer of Thoroton	Member of the House of Lords	Shadow Justice Secretary; Shadow Lord Chancellor	
11		Karl Turner	Kingston upon Hull East	Shadow Attorney General	
12		Chris Bryant	Rhondda	Shadow Leader of the House of Commons	

=== 27 June ===
#	Portrait	MP	Constituency	Office	Notes
13		Lisa Nandy	Wigan	Shadow Energy Secretary	Joint resignation; released statement together, calling on Tom Watson to take over as interim leader.
14		Owen Smith	Pontypridd	Shadow Work and Pensions Secretary	Joint resignation; released statement together, calling on Tom Watson to take over as interim leader.
15		Angela Eagle	Wallasey	Shadow First Secretary of State; Shadow Business Secretary	
16		John Healey	Wentworth and Dearne	Shadow Minister for Housing	Returned to the Shadow Cabinet as Shadow Housing Secretary on 6 October.
17		Nia Griffith	Llanelli	Shadow Welsh Secretary	Returned to the Shadow Cabinet as Shadow Defence Secretary on 6 October.
18		Maria Eagle	Garston and Halewood	Shadow Culture Secretary	
19		Kate Green	Stretford and Urmston	Shadow Minister for Women and Equalities	
20		Luciana Berger	Liverpool Wavertree	Shadow Minister for Mental Health	

=== 29 June ===
#	Portrait	MP	Constituency	Office	Notes
21		Pat Glass	North West Durham	Shadow Education Secretary	Appointed to replace Lucy Powell on 27 June; resigned after two days in the Shadow Cabinet, saying that she had decided to stand down at the next general election.

== Aftermath ==
=== No confidence motion ===
Motion of no confidence
Ballot →	28 June 2016	
Required majority →	115 out of 229 Labour MPs	
Ayes	172 / 229	75.1%
Noes	40 / 229	17.5%
Spoilt ballot	4 / 229	1.7%
Did not vote	13 / 229	5.7%

=== Leadership challenge ===
The 2016 Labour Party leadership election was called when a challenge to Jeremy Corbyn as Leader of the Labour Party arose following criticism of his approach to the Remain campaign in the referendum on membership of the European Union and questions about his leadership of the party.

Following a period of tension over Corbyn's leadership, the immediate trigger to events was the Leave result of the referendum. Hilary Benn, the Shadow Foreign Secretary, was dismissed by Corbyn on 25 June after Benn expressed no confidence in him. More than two dozen members of the Shadow Cabinet resigned over the following two days, and a no-confidence vote was supported by 172 MPs in the Parliamentary Labour Party, against 40 supporting Corbyn. It was reported that Tom Watson, the Deputy Leader, told Corbyn that he would face a challenge to his position as leader. Corbyn stated that he would not resign.

By the end of June, Angela Eagle and Owen Smith were being promoted as intending to contest the leadership. Eagle announced her candidacy on 11 July, and Smith did likewise on 13 July. The National Executive Committee decided that, as the incumbent, Corbyn would be automatically included on the ballot without requiring nominations from the parliamentary party; some political analysts had previously predicted that Corbyn would struggle to obtain the requisite number of signatures had that been required.

Eagle pulled out of the race on 19 July, leaving Smith to challenge Corbyn for the leadership in a head-to-head race; Eagle said that she would back Smith after she had attracted fewer nominations. Smith told the BBC that Eagle was a "star" and that she would be "at [his] right hand" if he won the leadership.

The result was announced on 24 September 2016. Corbyn won the election with 313,209 votes, increasing his share of the vote from 59.5% to 61.8% compared with the result of the 2015 leadership election and receiving some 62,000 more votes than in 2015.

=== The 'chicken coup' ===
A number of media outlets and Corbyn supporters used the name "chicken coup" to refer to the 2016 shadow cabinet resignations.
