= Shadow Leader of the House of Lords =

Position in the British Shadow Cabinet

Leader of the Opposition in the House of Lords Shadow Leader of the House of Lords
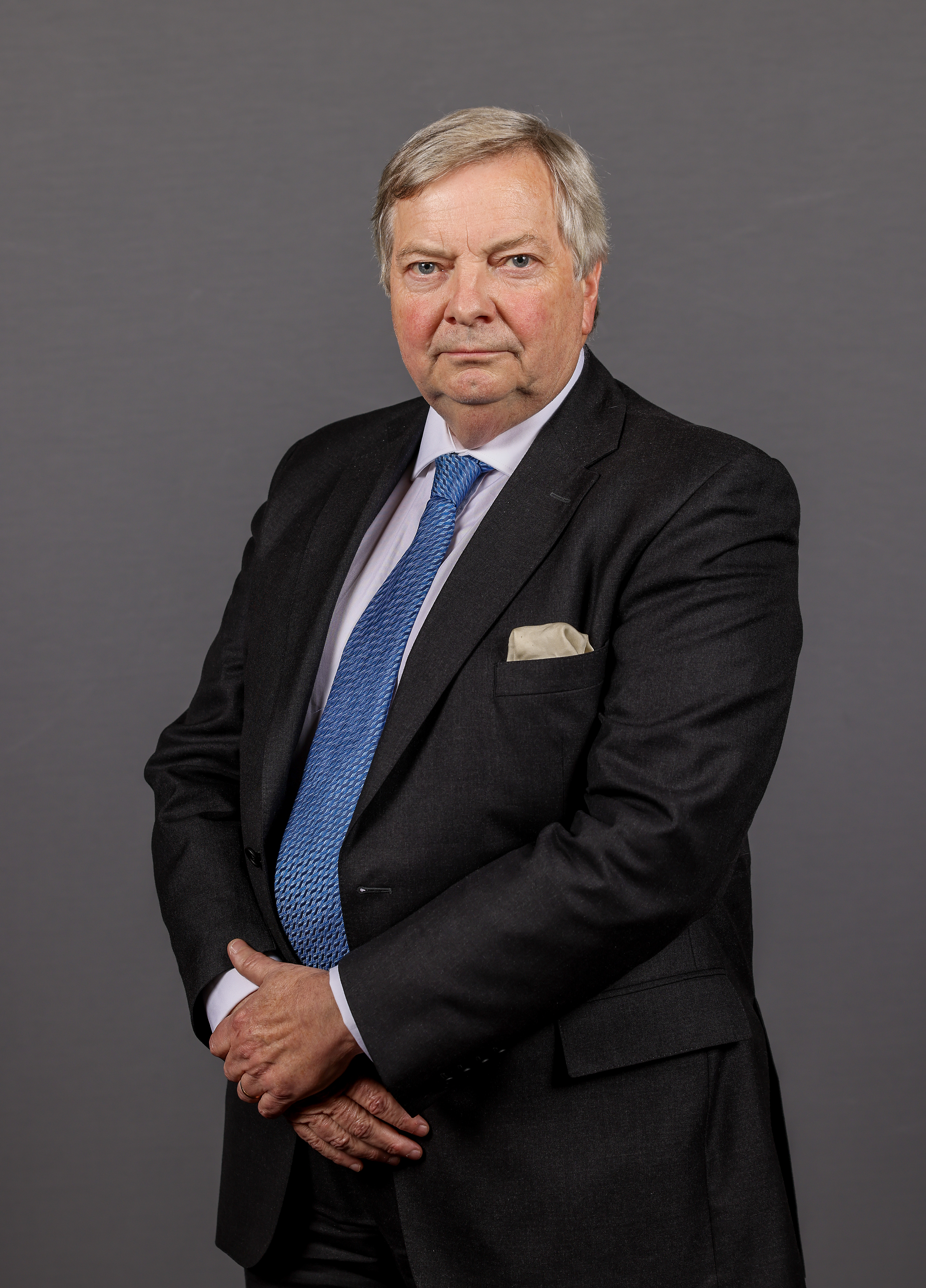
- Incumbent; Nicholas True, Baron True since 8 July 2024
- Appointer: Leader of the Opposition
- Formation: 1807
- First holder: Lord Grenville; Leader of the Opposition in the Lords; The Marquess of Crewe; Shadow Leader of the Lords
- Website: The Conservative Party

The Shadow Leader of the House of Lords, also referred as the Leader of the Opposition in the House of Lords, and casually as the Shadow Lords Leader, is the person who leads the Official Opposition in the House of Lords. Their job is to work with the Leader, Lord Speaker and other senior Lords to organise business. They also work with the opposition Chief Whip and other party spokespeople to organise the party. The holder of this office would normally become Leader of the House of Lords if the party wins an election and forms the government. This position has been held by Lord True since 8 July 2024. In the nineteenth century, party affiliations were generally less fixed and the leaders in the two Houses were often of equal status. A single and clear Leader of the Opposition was only definitively settled if the opposition leader in the House of Commons or House of Lords was the outgoing prime minister. However, since the Parliament Act 1911, there has been no dispute that the leader in the House of Commons is pre-eminent and has always held the primary title.

== Shadow Leaders of the House of Lords (1911-present) ==
This only lists leaders from the Parliament Act 1911, as that's when the Common's Leader of the Opposition was put as pre-eminent over the Lords. Previous Leaders are here

| Name | Portrait | Entered office | Left office | Political party |
|---|---|---|---|---|
| The Marquess of Lansdowne | | 13 November 1911 | 25 May 1915 | Conservative |
| Vacant^{[A]} | | 25 May 1915 | 6 December 1916 | |
| The Marquess of Crewe | | 6 December 1916 | 21 November 1922 | Liberal |
| Vacant^{[B]} | | 21 November 1922 | 22 January 1924 | Labour |
| The Marquess Curzon of Kedleston | | 22 January 1924 | 4 November 1924 | Conservative |
| The Viscount Haldane | | 4 November 1924 | 19 August 1928 | Labour |
| The Lord Parmoor | | 19 August 1928 | 5 June 1929 | Labour |
| The Marquess of Salisbury | | 5 June 1929 | ~1930 | Conservative |
| The Viscount Hailsham | | ~1930 | 24 August 1931 | Conservative |
| The Lord Parmoor | | 24 August 1931 | 7 October 1931 | Labour |
| The Lord Ponsonby of Shulbrede | | 7 October 1931 | 25 October 1935 | Labour |
| The Lord Snell | | 25 October 1935 | 22 May 1940 | Labour |
| The Viscount Addison | | 22 May 1940 | 23 May 1945 | Labour |
| Viscount Cranborne^{[C]} | | 23 May 1945 | 26 October 1951 | Conservative |
| The Lord Addison | | 26 October 1951 | ~1952 | Labour |
| The Earl Jowitt | | ~1952 | 14 December 1955 | Labour |
| The Viscount Alexander of Hillsborough^{[D]} | | 14 December 1955 | 16 October 1964 | Labour |
| The Lord Carrington | | 16 October 1964 | 19 June 1970 | Conservative |
| The Lord Shackleton | | 19 June 1970 | 4 March 1974 | Labour |
| The Lord Carrington | | 4 March 1974 | 4 May 1979 | Conservative |
| The Lord Peart | | 4 May 1979 | 4 November 1982 | Labour |
| The Lord Cledwyn of Penrhos | | 4 November 1982 | 18 July 1992 | Labour |
| The Lord Richard | | 18 July 1992 | 2 May 1997 | Labour |
| Viscount Cranborne^{[E]} | | 2 May 1997 | 3 December 1998 | Conservative |
| The Lord Strathclyde | | 3 December 1998 | 11 May 2010 | Conservative |
| The Baroness Royall of Blaisdon | | 11 May 2010 | 27 May 2015 | Labour |
| The Baroness Smith of Basildon | | 27 May 2015 | 5 July 2024 | Labour |
| The Lord True | | 8 July 2024 | Incumbent | Conservative |

== Deputy Shadow Leaders of the House of Lords ==
| Name | Portrait | Entered office | Left office | Political party |
|---|---|---|---|---|
| The Viscount Dilhorne | | 1964 | 1966 | Conservative |
| The Lord Harlech | | 1966 | 27 June 1967 | Conservative |
| The Earl Jellicoe | | 27 June 1967 | 19 June 1970 | Conservative |
| Office vacant | | 19 June 1970 | 1976 | |
| The Earl Ferrers | | 1976 | 1983 | Conservative |
| Office vacant | | 1983 | 1988 | |
| The Earl Ferrers | | 1988 | 1997 | Conservative |
| Office vacant | | 30 November 1998 | 2000 | |
| The Baroness Blatch | | 2000 | 31 May 2005 | Conservative |
| Office vacant | | 31 May 2005 | 8 June 2005 | |
| The Lord Howell of Guildford | | 8 June 2005 | 6 May 2010 | Conservative |
| Office vacant | | 6 May 2010 | 8 October 2010 | |
| The Lord Hunt of Kings Heath | | 8 October 2010 | 27 June 2017 | Labour |
| The Baroness Hayter of Kentish Town | | 27 June 2017 | 13 October 2021 | Labour |
| Office vacant | | 13 October 2021 | 20 October 2021 | |
| The Lord Collins of Highbury | | 20 October 2021 | 5 July 2024 | Labour |
| Office vacant | | 5 July 2024 | 1 September 2024 | |
| The Earl Howe | | 1 September 2024 | 29 April 2026 | Conservative |
| Office vacant | | 29 April 2026 | 10 June 2026 | |
| The Earl Howe | | 10 June 2026 | Incumbent | Conservative |

== Notes ==
^{A} During Asquith's coalition government of 1915–1916, there was no formal opposition in either the Commons or the Lords.
^{B} The Labour Party did not appoint a leader in the Lords until it formed its first government in 1924.
^{C} The Marquess of Salisbury from 1947
^{D} The Earl Alexander of Hillsborough from 1963
^{E} The Marquess of Salisbury from 200

== See also ==
- Official Opposition frontbench
- Shadow Cabinet of Keir Starmer
- Shadow Leader of the House of Commons
