= European Federation of Krav Maga =

Sports organization

The European Federation of Krav Maga (FEKM for Fédération Européenne de Krav Maga in French) was founded in 1997 by Richard Douieb. Richard has received the delegation of Imi Lichtenfeld, the founder of Krav Maga, to represent the discipline in Europe in 1987. Since its creation, the FEKM has expanded in more than 12 countries around the world and counts 18 000 practitioners.
