= Haim Gidon =

Krav Maga instructor

- Nationality: (Israel) Israeli
- Style: Krav Maga
- Teacher: Imi Lichtenfeld
- Rank: 10th dan red belt in Krav Maga

Other information
- Notable students: Yigal Arbiv, Noam Gidon, Ohad Gidon, David Kahn

Haim Gidon is a teacher of Krav Maga (קרב מגע: "contact combat"), an Israeli-originated self-defense and military hand-to-hand combat system taught to military, police forces and civilians worldwide.

He was a co-founder of the IKMA (Israeli Krav Maga Association) in 1977. In 1994, upon Imi Lichtenfeld's retirement, he became the Grandmaster and president of the Israeli Krav Maga Association. He was granted an 8th dan white and red belt by Imi Lichtenfeld (also known as Imi Sde-Or), the founder of Krav Maga. Today Gidon now holds a 10th dan red belt which is the highest degree in his style of Krav Maga.

== Biography ==
Gidon was a member of Krav Maga founder Imi Lichtenfeld's first training class in the early 1960s. Gidon fought in the Six-Day War, the War of Attrition, and the Yom Kippur War.

After the Six-Day War Gidon resumed his competitive boxing and decided to learn more about the Krav Maga principles he had learned in the military. In 1978, along with Lichtenfeld and other top instructors, Gidon co-founded the Israeli Krav Maga Association (IKMA) which he now heads as president. The IKMA board voted to add (Gidon System) to the IKMA's name to ensure people understand the specific brand and quality of Israeli Krav Maga that is taught. In 1994 Gidon was elected as IKMA president and opened his current gym and the main training center for the IKMA, located on Ben Zion Street in Netanya, Israel. (Netanya is just north [approximately 10 km / 6.5 miles] of the Wingate Institute, Israel's premier sporting academy, which also serves as a military training facility.)

In 1995 Lichtenfeld nominated Gidon as the top authority to grant 1st dan (level) Krav Maga black belts and up. In an IKMA ceremony Lichtenfeld awarded Gidon an 8th dan (one of only two Lichtenfeld ever awarded; later he changed the system from Japanese-inspired dan ranking to Practitioner, Graduate, Expert, Master grades) designating Gidon as the highest ranking Krav Maga instructor.

The IKMA (Israeli Krav Maga Association) was the original association founded by Imi Lichtenfeld, he appointed Gidon as its president when Imi retired. Videos and pictures testify to this appointment, including the video recorded moment when Master Gidon earned 8th Dan.

Lichtenfeld approved of Gidon's adding extensive groundwork, modified weapons defenses and other additions/improvements to the Krav Maga system. As president of the IKMA Haim Gidon has taught defensive tactics for the last thirty years to Israel's security and military agencies. Master Gidon received a commendation from the Office of the Israeli Prime Minister thanking him for his teaching contributions to Israel's security organizations.
