= The Real Fauda =

Documentary about a television show

- The Real Fauda
- Written by: Oren Rosenfeld; Jane Corbin
- Directed by: Oren Rosenfeld
- Original language: English

Production
- Producer: BBC
- Running time: 55 minutes

Original release
- Release: 2 January 2018

The Real Fauda is a 2018 BBC documentary film that explores the background reality of the TV Series Fauda ('Chaos') to find the source of the Israeli TV thriller's popularity in Arab countries. The documentary was filmed with exclusive behind the scenes access to season 2 of Fauda, and for the first time, real access to the group that the hit series is based on.

== Description ==
For the first time, and in light of the popularity of Fauda, Oren Rosenfeld and Jane Corbin were granted exclusive access to the clandestine operatives and organization of the Yamas. The documentary delves into the secretive world of the real life operatives, and how closely the show mirrors the reality. The underlying theme is how the Arab-Israeli conflict plays out in Fauda and the realities of the situation in the region.

The documentary includes interviews with Lior Raz the actor who plays Doron in Fauda and Laetitia Eido who plays Dr. Shirin El Abed.

Documentary commentary by Oren Rosenfeld for I24 News
