= David Kahn (martial artist) =

Krav Maga martial artist

- Born: July 28, 1972 (age 54)
- Nationality: United States
- Style: Krav Maga
- Teachers: Rick Blitstein, Alan Feldman, Haim Gidon
- Rank: 4th dan black belt (Israeli Krav Maga Association [Gidon System]) in Krav Maga, 5th dan black belt (American Judo Association Combat Jiu-Jitsu)

Other information
- Website: http://www.davidkahnkravmaga.com/

David Kahn is an American martial artist and author of seven Krav Maga instruction books. He is a third generation Krav Maga black belt directly descendent from Krav Maga founder Imi Lichtenfeld. A student of Israeli martial artist and Israeli Krav Maga Association (IKMA) President Grandmaster Haim Gidon—an original student of Lichtenfeld—Kahn is the IKMA United States Chief Instructor, and an IKMA and FIMA [Federation of Israeli Martial Arts] board member.

== Biography ==
David Kahn played Varsity football at Princeton University, and began Krav Maga instruction with Krav Maga senior instructor Rick Blitstein (a 1981 graduate of Imi Lichtenfeld’s first international instructor course) while a law student at University of Miami Law School. After graduating law school, Kahn began regular travel between the U.S. and Netanya, Israel for Krav Maga training with Grandmaster Gidon. He travelled between the U.S. and Israel for training approximately 30 times over the next 15 years.

== Career ==
Kahn has published seven Krav Maga books, three of which are published by Macmillan Publishers' St. Martin’s Publishing Group. His instruction emphasizes morality, integrity, and the historical context that gave rise to Krav Maga. While that context required the essential movements of Krav Maga work for anyone, Kahn’s civilian Krav Maga self-defense curriculum also encourages physical fitness.

Kahn provides personal Krav Maga training to public figures, including the late James Gandolfini, who played Tony Soprano in the six-series HBO drama The Sopranos. Gandolfini was also a founding business partner in Kahn’s IKMA U.S. training facilities.

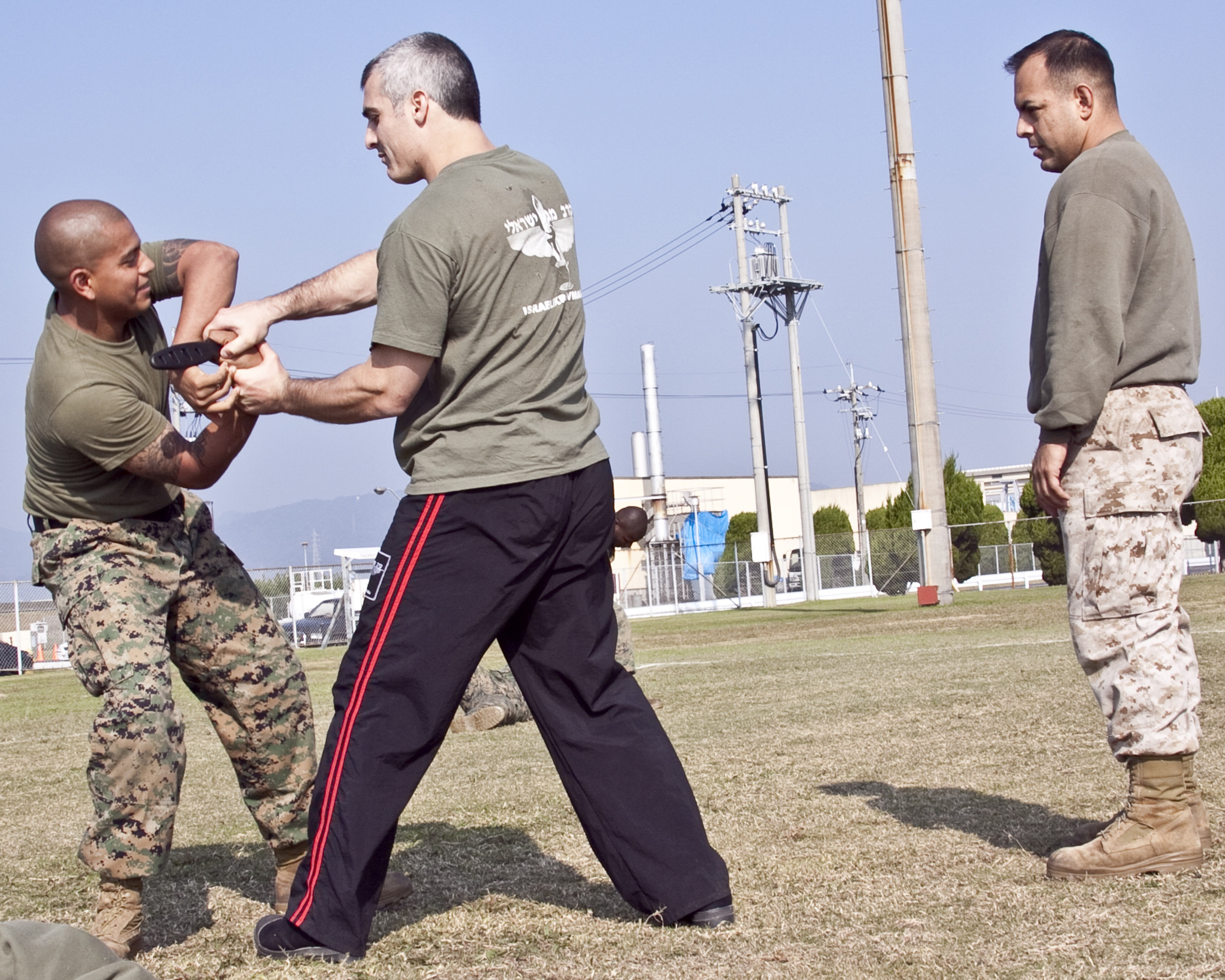
David Kahn, center, teaches Krav Maga to United States Marine Corps Sergeants at MCAS Iwakuni.

He has provided martial arts instruction to over 250 federal, state, and local law enforcement agencies including the armed forces of the United States since 2000. IKMA U.S. police force courses include relationship development between police forces and community members, as well as non-lethal self-defense tactics training for police officers. Kahn's U.S. law enforcement and military training clients include police departments in the State of New Jersey, the Federal Bureau of Investigation, the United States Marine Corps, and United States Special Operations Forces.

In addition to teaching Krav Maga, David Kahn is a technology entrepreneur: his co-invention of a personal data aggregating cryptocurrency method and system was patented in 2024.

== Education ==
- AB, Princeton University; 1994.
- JD, University of Miami Law School; 1998.

== Publications ==
- Krav Maga: An Essential Guide to the Renowned Method—for Self Defense and Fitness (New York, NY: St. Martin’s Press. 2004.) ISBN 978-0312331771
- Advanced Krav Maga—The Next Level of Fitness and Self-Defense (New York, NY: St. Martin’s Press. 2008.) ISBN 978-0312361648
- Krav Maga Weapon Defenses (Wolfeboro, NH: YMAA Publication Center. 2012.) ISBN 978-1594392405
- Krav Maga Professional Tactics (Wolfeboro, NH: YMAA Publication Center. 2016.) ISBN 978-1594398940
- Krav Maga Defense—How to Defend Yourself Against the 12 Most Common Unarmed Street Attacks (New York, NY: St. Martin’s Griffin. 2016.) ISBN 978-1250090829
- Krav Maga Combatives: Maximum Effect (Wolfeboro, NH: YMAA Publication Center. 2019.) ISBN 978-1594396816
- Krav Maga Fundamental Strategies (Wolfeboro, NH: YMAA Publication Center. 2021.) ISBN 978-1594398131
- Kahn, David and Nicholas Capriglione. "Modern Force Tactics for Safer Policing." Police Chief Online, 11 Feb. 2026, https://www.policechiefmagazine.org/modern-force-tactics-safer-policing/.
