= Darren Levine =

American martial artist (born 1960)

- Born: April 3, 1960 (age 66); Los Angeles, California
- Died: January 28, 2026 (aged 65)
- Nationality: American
- Style: Krav Maga
- Teacher: Imi Lichtenfeld
- Rank: 8th dan black belt in Krav Maga

Other information
- Notable students: John Whitman, Steve Spoth, Christian Medina
- Website: http://www.kravmaga.com/

Darren R. Levine (born April 3, 1960 in Los Angeles, California, United States) was a martial artist, an entrepreneur, and a prosecutor for the Los Angeles County District Attorney's office. He is best known for helping to popularize Krav Maga.

== Career ==
Levine, who graduated from Loyola Law School, has worked as a Deputy District Attorney for Los Angeles County since 1991. The same year, Levine and his detectives built a case against Gerald Mason, who had evaded arrest since 1957 for the rape of a teenage girl, the assault of three other teenagers, and the murder of two police officers. Mason was sentenced to life imprisonment, ending one of the longest unsolved cases in the United States.

As of September 2007, he has a 100% conviction rate. He has been a recipient of several honors from district attorney groups and victim's rights groups.

== Krav Maga ==
Levine is the founder of the Krav Maga Association of America and Krav Maga Worldwide.

In 1981, Levine was selected as part of the first group outside of Israel to train in Krav Maga. While training in Israel, Levine was befriended by Krav Maga founder Imi Lichtenfeld. In 1982, Lichtenfeld traveled to Los Angeles to stay with Levine and continue his training. Levine is one of only two recipients of a Krav Maga Founder's Diploma awarded by Lichtenfeld before his death in 1998 (the other recipient was Eyal Yanilov, who founded Krav Maga Global). At the time, Levine was the highest ranking instructor in the United States, and had training centers in West Los Angeles, New York City, Chicago, San Francisco, Boston, and Philadelphia. Levine holds an 8th degree black belt in the Krav Maga.

His wife, Marni Levine, was very influential in expanding Krav Maga Worldwide, particularly the Krav Maga Youth program, Km-X. She died on August 31, 2006, after a long fight against cancer.

Darren Levine is the co-author, with John Whitman and Ryan Hoover, of Complete Krav Maga, Black Belt Krav Maga, and Krav Maga for Beginners.
