= Israel's Arab Warriors =

2016 BBC Arabic documentary by Oren Rosenfeld

- Written by: Oren Rosenfeld; Jane Corbin
- Directed by: Oren Rosenfeld
- Original language: English

Production
- Producer: BBC Arabic
- Running time: 50 minutes

Original release
- Network: BBC Arabic
- Release: 15 October 2016

Israel's Arab Warriors is a BBC Arabic documentary shot over six months by a team that gained access to the Gadsar Nahal - the all-Arab unit of (500 and growing) of the Israel Defence Forces (IDF).

The documentary aired to over 10 million Arabic-speaking homes. For the first time, the BBC's Arabic service broadcast a documentary focusing on Israel's minority Arab population and the growing number who voluntarily serve in the IDF. In the film, Senior BBC Reporter Jane Corbin follows the first all-Arab unit of the Israeli Defense Forces to be deployed inside the West Bank and others serving in integrated units with Jewish soldiers.

It was commissioned by BBC Arabic, and the presence of Arab soldiers in the IDF has caused some controversy. According to the documentary, there were ten times as many Israeli Arabs - Muslims and Christians - joining the IDF in 2016 compared to 2013. The director of the documentary, Oren Rosenfeld, says he thinks that the Arab world will be surprised to see Arabs, both Muslim and Christian soldiers, fighting for Israel against other Arabs.
