= Carbohydrate mouth rinsing =

Technique of swishing carbohydrate solution to improve athletic performance

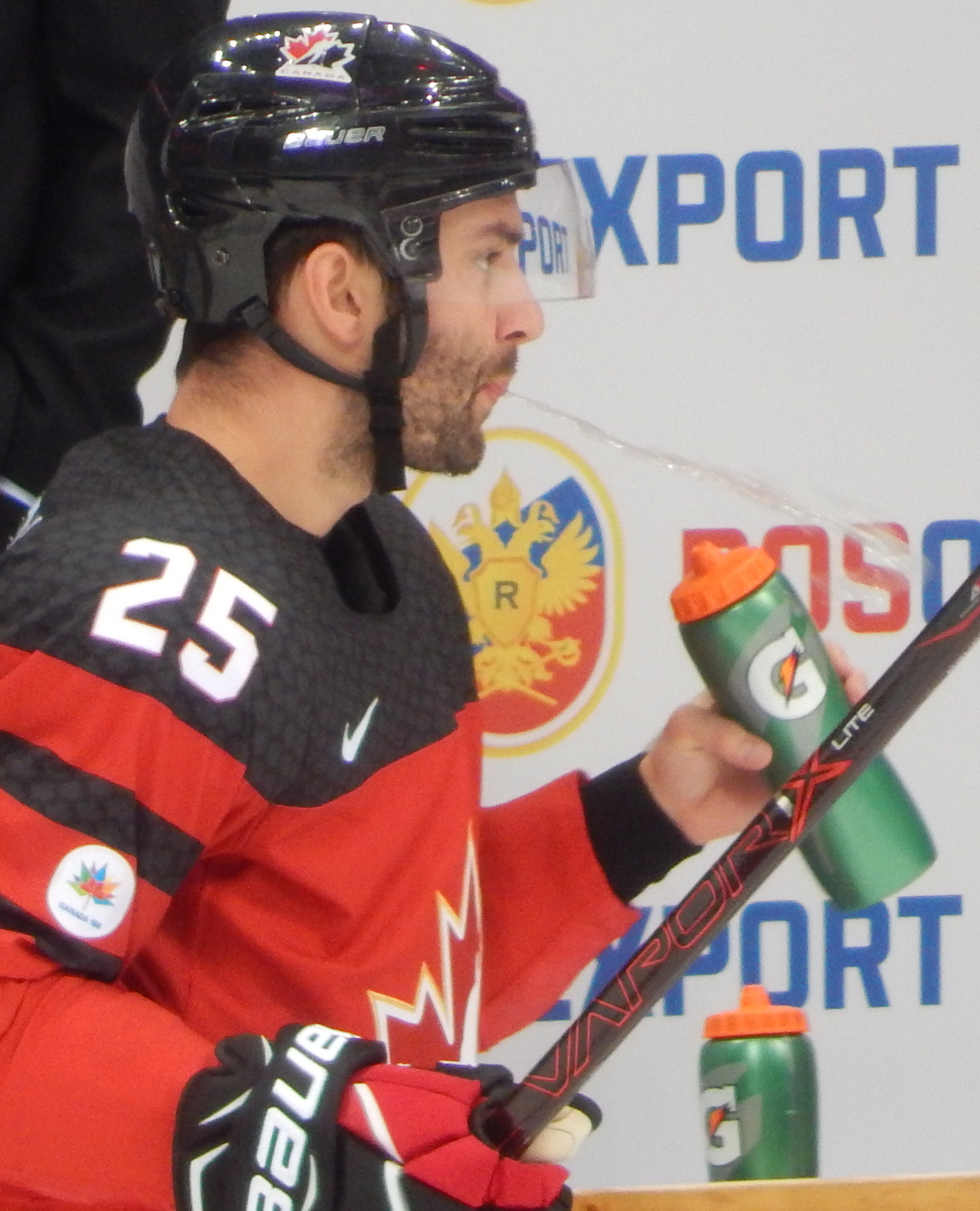
Canadian ice hockey player Teddy Purcell spits out fluid after rinsing

Carbohydrate mouth rinsing is a sports nutrition technique in which a carbohydrate-containing solution is swished in the mouth for several seconds and then spat out without being swallowed. The practice is intended to enhance physical performance, particularly during high-intensity exercise lasting between 30 and 60 minutes. Unlike traditional carbohydrate ingestion, mouth rinsing does not provide metabolic energy, but is believed to activate oral receptors that stimulate brain regions involved in reward and motor control, and perceived effort. Studies have reported performance improvements of approximately 2–3% in various athletic contexts, though results vary depending on exercise type, environmental conditions, and individual sensitivity to carbohydrate taste.

== Mechanism ==
The mechanism underlying carbohydrate mouth rinsing is not fully understood but is thought to involve the activation of oral receptors located on the tongue, soft palate, and larynx that signal to brain regions associated with reward, arousal, motor control, and pain modulation. Although the rinse does not provide metabolic energy, the presence of carbohydrate in the mouth may trigger a neural response that enhances physical performance by increasing motivation or reducing perceived effort. Research by Neil Clarke and colleagues at Coventry University suggests that this effect occurs subconsciously. In a study using tasteless maltodextrin, participants were unable to distinguish it from the control rinse, yet still demonstrated improved performance across several measures.

Most studies suggest that carbohydrate mouth rinsing is most effective during high-intensity exercise lasting between 30 and 60 minutes. Carbohydrate rinsing can enhance performance when the solution is swished in the mouth for 5 to 10 seconds, with longer durations being more effective due to increased stimulation of oral carbohydrate receptors. On average, rinsing with a 6–8% carbohydrate solution for around 10 seconds has been associated with a 2–3% improvement in performance, including enhanced motor skill execution and reduced ratings of perceived exertion. A dose-response relationship has been observed, with longer rinse durations producing greater performance benefits, though higher concentrations (12–16%) offer no added advantage over 6–8% solutions.

The benefit of carbohydrate mouth rinsing appears more consistent in temperate conditions and may be attenuated in hot or humid environments.

== Effects ==
The ergogenic effect of carbohydrate mouth rinsing was first observed in the 1990s, when studies showed performance benefits during short, intense exercise, contradicting the idea that carbohydrates help only by replenishing muscle glycogen. Intravenous glucose had no impact on performance, but simply rinsing the mouth with a carbohydrate solution did. This pointed to a central, not metabolic, mechanism. Follow-up studies in cyclists and runners confirmed the effect.

A 2017 study published in the European Journal of Sport Science found that carbohydrate mouth rinsing significantly enhanced various performance metrics in 12 healthy men in their early to mid-20s. Researchers from Coventry University observed improvements in jumping height, the number of bench presses and squats completed, 10-meter sprint times, and subjective alertness. In a separate study, researcher Trent Stellingwerff of the Canadian Sport Institute found that carb rinsing significantly increased peak power during leg exercises. A 2018 study involving 15 recreationally trained women found that carbohydrate mouth rinsing with a 6% maltodextrin solution significantly increased total volume lifted (~12%) across multiple resistance exercises and reduced perceived exertion compared to a placebo.

A 2022 study by Shirai et al. found that carbohydrate mouth rinsing significantly reduced performance decline during prolonged, high-intensity intermittent exercise in male college students. In a randomized crossover trial, it led to higher average power output in later Wingate test sets compared to water, despite no changes in blood glucose levels. The results suggested that carbohydrate mouth rinsing improve performance through non-metabolic, likely neural, mechanisms.

A 2024 randomized crossover study by Yang et al. found that carbohydrate mouth rinsing improved performance in multi-joint resistance exercise. Twenty healthy men performed Romanian deadlifts after rinsing with either a 6.6% maltodextrin solution or water (placebo). Carbohydrate mouth rinsing significantly increased concentric peak power, eccentric peak power, and total work compared to placebo, indicating enhanced muscle performance from pre-exercise carbohydrate mouth rinsing.

A 2019 study by Baltazar-Martins and Del Coso, published in Frontiers in Nutrition, found that carbohydrate mouth rinsing significantly improved performance in a simulated 25.3 km cycling time trial. 16 well-trained cyclists used a 6.4% carbohydrate solution or a taste-matched placebo. The carbohydrate rinse reduced completion time, increased overall power output and climbing power, and led to higher perceived exertion. The findings suggest that carbohydrate mouth rinsing can be an effective strategy to enhance performance during cycling, especially in high-intensity training sessions with low carbohydrate intake. A 2024 pilot study by Hartley et al. further explored the impact of different carbohydrate oral rinses on cycling performance, with a focus on individual taste sensitivity. Ten male participants completed five time trials in a fasted state using maltodextrin, oligofructose, glucose, sucralose, or water as a rinse. No significant overall improvement in cycling time or power output was observed across rinses. However, participants who did not benefit from the maltodextrin rinse reported higher baseline taste intensity to complex carbohydrates than those who did. This suggests that individual taste sensitivity may modulate the effectiveness of carbohydrate oral rinsing on performance.

Some studies have found no benefit. A 2017 study by Greek and South African researchers found no effect of carbohydrate mouth rinsing on performance in 15 female runners who completed two 60-minute runs, one following a carbohydrate rinse and one with a placebo. The rinse had no impact on race times. Some researchers suggest that carbohydrate rinsing may be more effective in short, high-intensity activities like sprinting or resistance training, rather than in prolonged endurance exercise.

Carbohydrate mouth rinsing has been linked to improved cognitive performance during physical exertion, suggesting its utility in sports requiring simultaneous physical and mental demands.

== See also ==
- Sports drink
- Rating of perceived exertion
