= Yehoshua Sofer =

Jamaican American martial artist

Yehoshua Sofer is also the name of a victim of the June 2010 West Bank shooting.

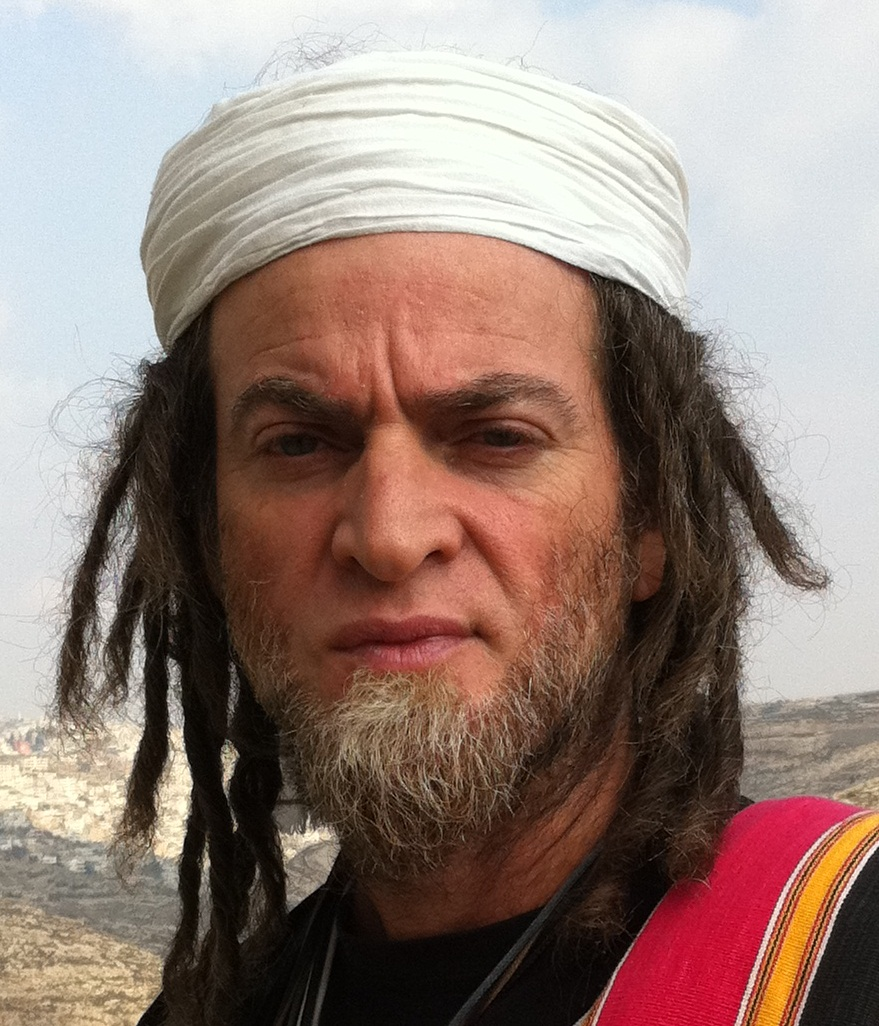
Sofer in 2011

Yehoshua Sofer (Hebrew: יהושע סופר) is an Israeli-Jamaican hip hop and rap artist, and a martial artist. As a martial artist, he is the founder of Abir Warrior Arts Association of Israel, teaching his own style of “ Abir-Qesheth Hebrew Warrior Arts” (אבי״ר-קשת אומנות לחימה עברית) in Jerusalem and Tel Aviv, claiming it to be a tradition of his family dating to Israelite antiquity preserved by an underground school of "Bani Abir" in Habban, Yemen. Sofer perceives this style of martial arts training to be a continuation of the practices of the Jewish people prior to the Second Temple period. The style takes inspiration from the Hebrew alphabet, basing moves and stances on Hebrew letters.

== Biography ==
He was born in 1958 in Jamaica and his family moved to Los Angeles in 1963 where he studied Tang Soo Do, receiving a black belt by 1968, aged ten. He studied Kuk Sool Won from 1974, advancing to 6th dan, and worked as a trainer and bodyguard during the 1970s and 1980s.

== Singing career ==
In the 1990s, he was a hip hop singer and rapper under the name Nigel Addmore, and was an MC on the album Humus Metamtem in 1993. The album's track "Hummus makes you stupid" was a club hit in Israel.

He appeared in the documentary films Awake Zion in 2005, and Hummus the Movie in 2016.

== Martial arts career ==
In 2000, he ran a Kuk Sool Won school at the International Convention, Jerusalem.

In 2002, he founded the Abir Warrior Arts Association of Israel, teaching his own style of “Abir-Qesheth Hebrew Warrior Arts” (אבי״ר-קשת אומנות לחימה עברית) in Jerusalem and Tel Aviv, claiming it to be a tradition of his family dating to Israelite antiquity preserved by an underground school of "Bani Abir" in Habban, Yemen, and styling himself Aluf Abir / אלוף אבי״ר ("Grandmaster of Abir"). Sofer perceives this style of martial arts training to be a continuation of the practices of the Jewish people prior to the Second Temple period.

The word אביר abir in Modern Hebrew means "knight". The style takes inspiration from the Hebrew alphabet, basing moves and stances on Hebrew letters.

== See also ==
- Krav Maga, a 20th-century origin Israeli martial art conceived by Imi Sde-Or in the 1940s
