= Oren Rosenfeld =

Israeli documentary filmmaker and photojournalist (born 1976)

- אורן רוזנפלד
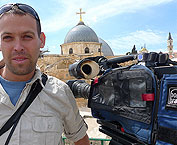
- Rosenfeld filming in Jerusalem, Israel
- Born: 29 January 1976 (age 50); Jerusalem, Israel
- Occupations: Film director, producer, journalist
- Years active: 1999–present

Oren Rosenfeld (Hebrew: אורן רוזנפלד; born 29 January 1976) is an Israeli documentary filmmaker, photojournalist, and film producer.

== Career ==
Rosenfeld was born in Jerusalem on 29 January 1976. He started his career as a photojournalist covering the 2nd Palestinian Intifada. In October 2016, he Directed and co-wrote Israel's Arab Warriors for the BBC. In the film, he and cowriter Jane Corbin followed the first unit of Israeli Arab soldiers to serve in the West Bank.

Rosenfeld's award-winning film Hummus the Movie stirred controversy when the Guinness Book of World records refused to send representatives to judge the world's largest plate of hummus due to alleged security concerns.

In 2017 Rosenfeld joined Jane Corbin to write and Direct The Real Fauda, a BBC documentary about the real story behind the hit Netflix drama Fauda.

Rosenfeld discussed the nature of the documentary, and the uniqueness of the project for I24 News

In early 2018, Rosenfeld returned to India to continue production of Mumbai Jews a film about the long-established Jewish Community of Mumbai, and the significance or their cultural, social and political contributions to India.

Mumbai Jews touches the story of Moshe Holtzberg, one of the survivors of the 2008 Mumbai terror attacks. He was almost two years old when the attack orphaned him. Rosenfeld follows his return, 10 years later. The story focuses on Holtzberg's nanny Sandra Samuel In 2010 Oren Founded his production company Holy-Land Productions.

Rosenfeld's latest work Lost in Paradise Goa won the LIAFF award for Best Short Documentary.

In 2022 Rosenfeld won his second Emmy Award for his camera work for Vice News Battle for Jerusalem.

In 2024 Rosenfeld and his partner, Rebecca Shore, published "Marathon Mom", a documentary about Beatie Deutsch, an ultra-Orthodox mother and a professional marathon runner. Also in 2024, Rosenfeld published "Surviving Nova", who won the Peabody award. The movie is also nominated for an Emmy Award.

In 2025, Rosenfeld released a documentary for the American investigative program Frontline, titled A Year of War: Israelis and Palestinians. The Movie has received an Emmy nomination.
