= David Kahn =

David Kahn or Khan may refer to:

- David Kahn (writer) (1930–2024), American historian of cryptography
- David Kahn (sports executive) (born 1961), former president of basketball operations of the Minnesota Timberwolves
- David Kahn (martial artist), American martial artist
- David Khan (politician) (born 1974), Canadian politician
- David Khan (diplomat) (1795–1851), Persian ambassador
