= Orna Ostfeld =

Israeli basketball player and coach

- אורנה אוסטפלד
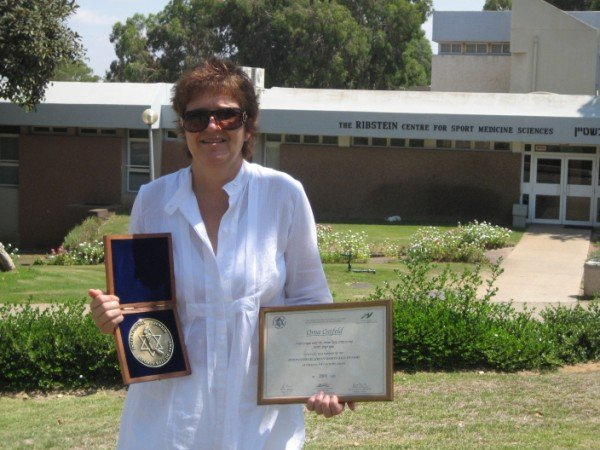
- Born: December 23, 1952 (age 73); Jerusalem, Israel
- Education: Wingate Institute for Physical Education and Sport Sciences
- Occupations: Former basketball player, and current basketball coach
- Employer: Anda Ramat HaSharon
- Known for: in the Guinness Book of World Records for scoring the most-ever points scored in a women’s professional game (108)
- Awards: International Olympic Committee’s European Women and Sport Award (2005); International Jewish Sports Hall of Fame Pillar of Achievement Award (2009)

Orna Ostfeld (Hebrew: אורנה אוסטפלד; born December 23, 1952) is an Israeli former basketball player and current basketball coach.

== Early life and non-basketball activities ==
Ostfeld is Jewish, and was born in Jerusalem, Israel.

She is a graduate of Wingate Institute for Physical Education and Sport Sciences, and is the first Jewish physical education teacher to work in the Arab school in Taibe.

In 2003, she was elected a member of the Ramat Hasharon Municipality Council.

== Basketball career ==
=== Player ===
Ostfeld played basketball in the Israel Super League, and for the Israeli National Women's Basketball Team.

As a player for Israel's Maccabi Ramat Khen, Ostfeld was entered in the Guinness Book of World Records for scoring 108 points in a 221–21 team victory on November 17, 1981, the most-ever points scored in a women's professional game.

=== Coach ===
As a basketball coach, during a seven-year period that began in 1998, Ostfeld guided the Anda Ramat HaSharon basketball team to four championships and Israel State Cup basketball titles.

=== Other basketball activities ===
In 1986, she founded the women's basketball team in Ramat Hasharon. Ostfeld is also one of the founders of the Ramat HaSharon Sports Association.

In 2004, her advocacy for increased funding and media coverage of women's sports led the Israeli High Court of Justice to order that the Union of Local Authorities fund women's sports associations at a rate of 1.5 times the sum allocated to equivalent men's sport associations.

Ostfeld is a board member of the Israel Basketball Federation.

== Personal life ==
Ostfeld has two adult sons from a previous marriage, Jonathan (b. 1977) and Ben (b. 1980). She lived with a woman partner for many years.

== Honors ==
Ostfeld was awarded the International Olympic Committee’s European Women and Sport Award in 2005 “As a player, administrator, and coach”, recognizing her dedication to and advancement of women's sports in Israel. It was awarded to five women from five continents, for their contribution and promotion of women's sport.

Ostfeld received the Pillar of Achievement Award from the International Jewish Sports Hall of Fame in 2009.
