= Daniel Baharier =

Israeli artist and sculptor

Daniel Baharier (Hebrew: דניאל בהריאר; born in 1956) is an Israeli artist and sculptor. His works, dealing with human movement, appear at the Wingate Institute at Assaf Harofeh Hospital, Sheba Medical Center and other public buildings in Israel and the world, such as New York and Tokyo. He also uses sculptural installations, collages and more.

== Biography ==
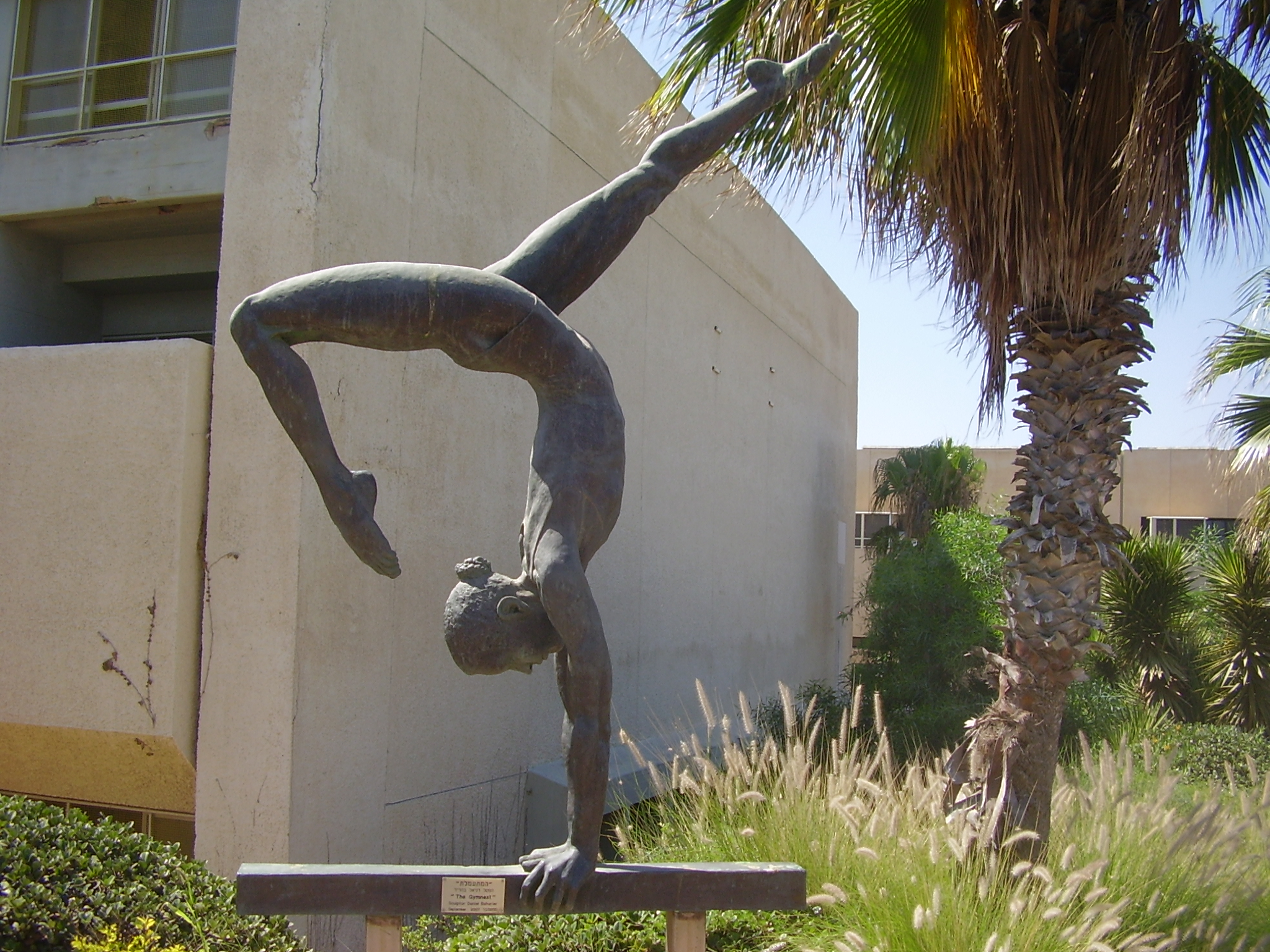
Baharier's scuplture The Gymnast at the Wingate Institute

Daniel Baharier was born in England in 1956 in the city of London in Croydon to Sydney and Miriam Baharier.

At 18, he began studying art at the Hertfordshire College of Art and Design, under the training of John Mills and Michael Gillespie. He then went on to study sculpture at the Leicester Polytechnic, University of Simone de Montfort under Sydney Herfli.

In 1980 he immigrated to Israel from London and began studying at Bezalel. After a year he decided to leave school because he felt that the level of study is not appropriate for him, as he finished five years of academic art studies in England.

From 1981 to 1982 he worked at the foundry in Atarot in Jerusalem and then at the foundry AP Netanya. Foundries worked for other artists in creating a patina and negatives for their works. Daniels personal works during this period were the first in exploring human motion, and women acrobatic movements that create physical stress.

Between 1983 and 1985 he served in the IDF deliberately M61 Vulcan, especially in Lebanon. After completing his military service, He began with a sculpture foundry shalom Saktsier in Rishon Lezion.

Between 1985 and 1987 he worked on the sculpture depicting parallel lines and broken symmetry, based on mathematical formulas.

In 1986–1987 he was a professor at the School of Art Sculpture school Ascola-meimad. In 1988 he opened his studio in the ancient port of Jaffa, where he worked for 13 years. During these years he developed his unique style, and created the sculpture at Assaf Harofeh Hospital, a portrait of Dr. Wim Malgo.

In 1990–2004 he taught at Old City of Jaffa Art College bronze casting, mould-making, plaster, clay, plastics, and welding.

In 1994–95, he was commissioned by Emilio Pellus, head of EDF Construction & Investments Ltd., to create 24 pieces, each one 3 to 3.5 (10–12 feet) meters in height, depicting figures from the Jewish Diaspora of a hundred years ago, for his Carmel Shuk 2000 project in Rishon-Le-Zion. At the time it was the largest commission of its type in Israel.

In 1993 created the sculpture Fantasy of Legends, which was displayed for two months on the beach in Tel Aviv.

In 1997 he participated in the exhibition "Second Hand" at the Tel Aviv Museum of Art, exhibiting the statue Broken symmetry.

Also in 1997, he part of the "Pay Roll" exhbition at the Cooltan Gallery in London, presenting the sculpture one of four. The sculpture depicted four seemly identical characters, differing only in changes in haircuts and placement.

In 2001, 21 small sculptures to be placed at the Wingate Institute, which currently has three giant statues. Their sizes are three and a half meters high on average. Today, his sculptures are placed in Tokyo, London, New York, Paris, Japan and more.

Former cabinet minister Meir Sheetrit owns five of his sculptures.

Baharier has his workshop located on the border of Jaffa and Tel Aviv.
