= Hummus the Movie =

2015 documentary film

- Official poster
- Directed by: Oren Rosenfeld
- Written by: Oren Rosenfeld; Rebecca Shore; Baruch Goldberg
- Produced by: Mitchell R. Julis; Raphael Shore; Michal Lee Sapir
- Release date: December 10, 2015 (Jerusalem Film Festival)
- Running time: 72 minutes
- Languages: English, Hebrew, Arabic

Hummus the Movie is a 2015 documentary film by Oren Rosenfeld. The film presents the unifying power of a foodway through three main characters.

Hummus is pegged to three stories about hummus-related careers, a Muslim, a Christian and a Jew. The Muslim is a woman named Suheila who runs a hummus restaurant in Acco and is known for her charity to the poor. The Christian is a young man whose family has been making hummus in Ramle for three generations and who is torn between staying in the family business or following his girlfriend to Berlin. The Jew, a man from a secular background who has become devout, joined the Breslover sect, and now sells hummus at a food stall in a gas station in the Israeli town of Yokneam. The segment features Yehoshua Sofer, a Jamaican-born rapper who had a hit Israeli pop song about hummus and influenced the Jewish hummus shop owner in Yokneam to become pious.

Hummus the Movie premiered at the 2016 Seattle International Film Festival and has since gone on to be selected for inclusion in film festivals and events around the globe.

== Awards ==
2017 - awarded for the best movie presenting modern Jewish life and culture, at Jewish Motifs International Film Festival in Warsaw, Poland.

2017 - awarded Best Feature Documentary ARFF International Berlin, Amsterdam, Paris, Barcelona at ARFF February 2017
