= Gilad Hesseg =

Israeli singer-songwriter (born 1971)

Gilad Hesseg גלעד השג
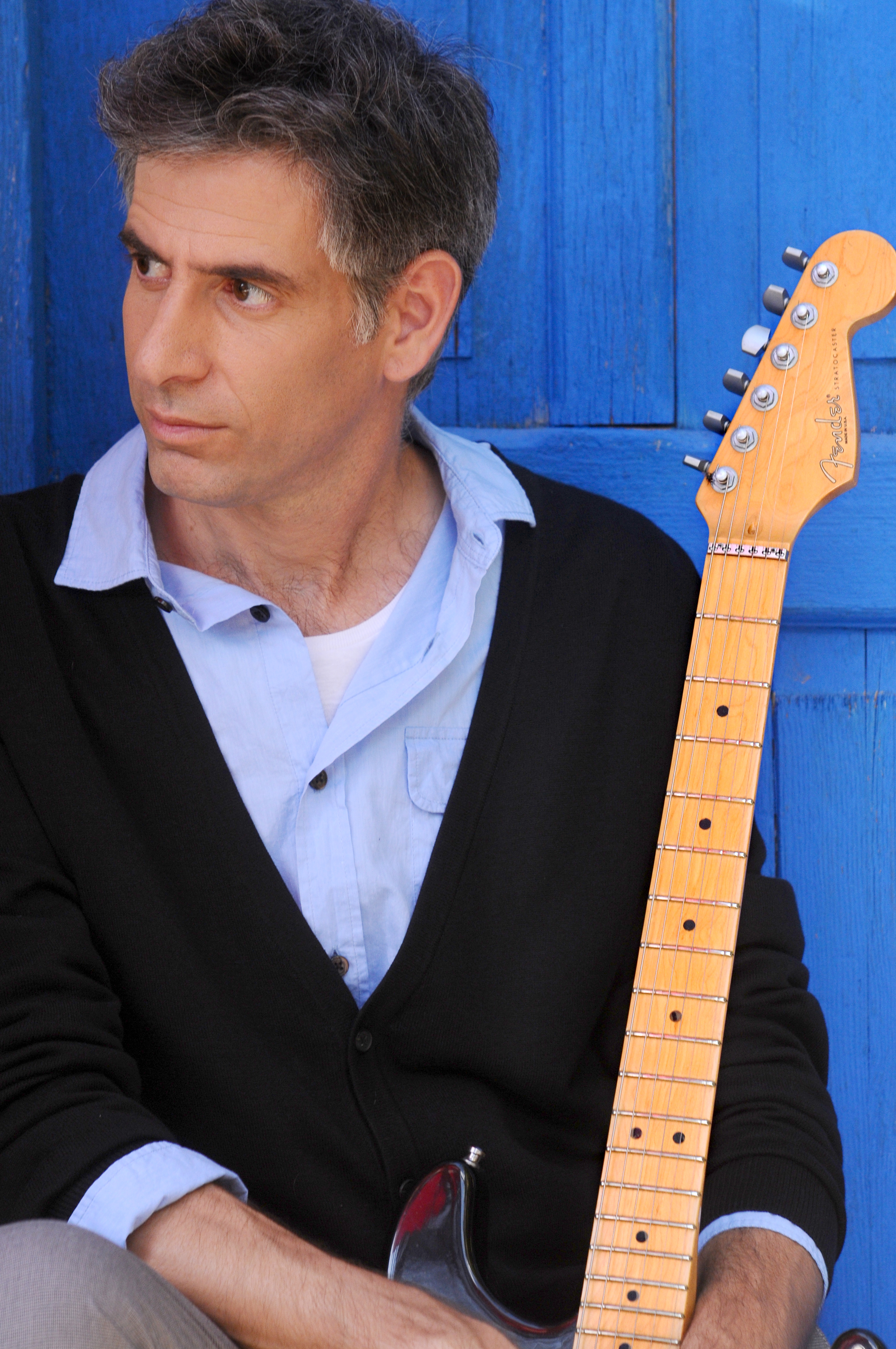
- Gilad Hesseg at the recording studio

Background information
- Born: September 3, 1971 (age 54)
- Origin: Nesher, Israel
- Genres: Folk rock, Pop rock
- Years active: 1971–present

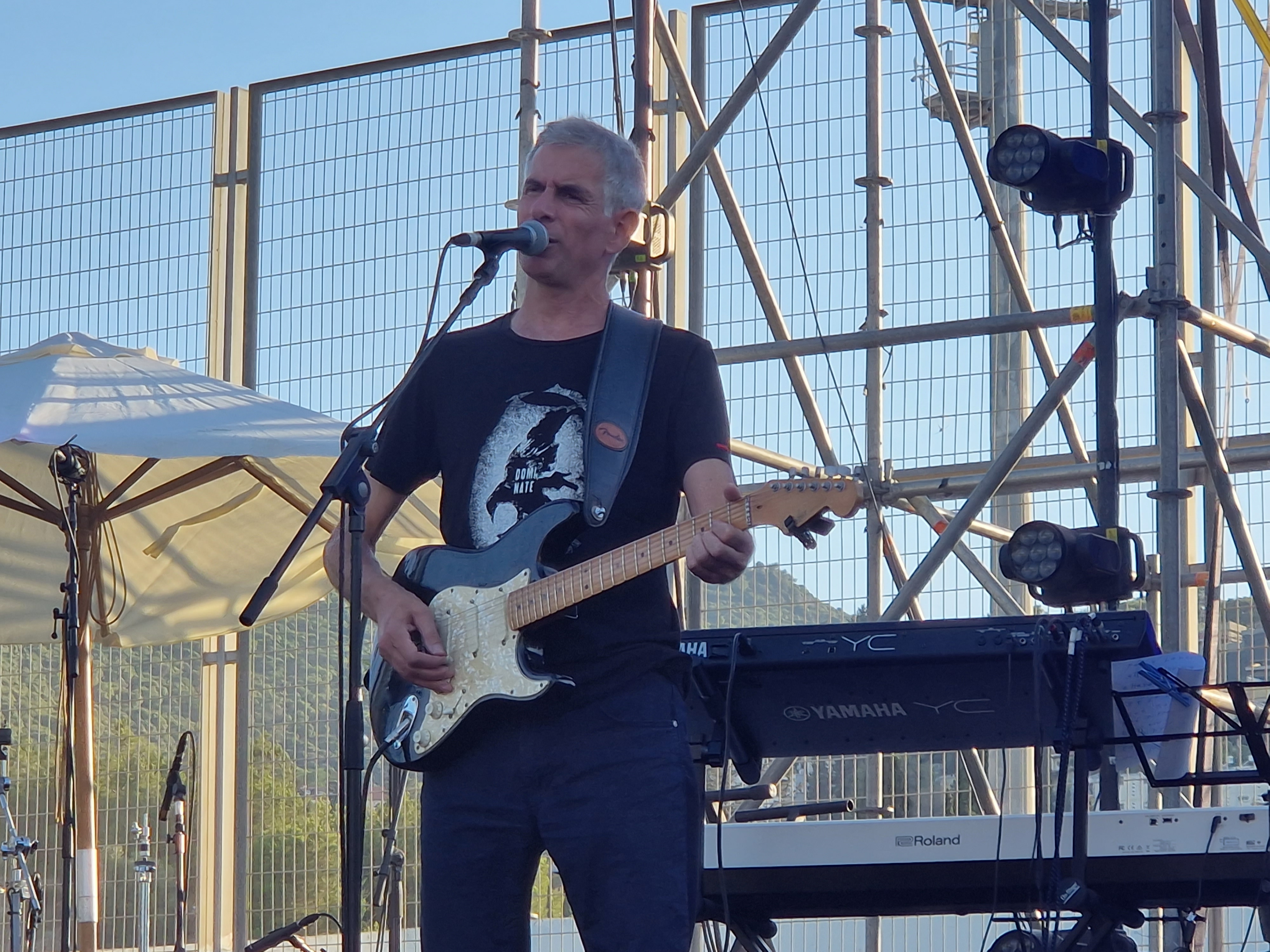
Gilad Hesseg, 2023

Gilad Hesseg (Hebrew: גלעד השג; September 3, 1971) is an Israeli folk rock singer-songwriter and composer. He has been active in the field of Israeli music for the best part of his life and has composed and recorded numerous songs, using his own and others’ lyrics. He has written and recorded the music for several musicals, and produced and directed a variety of music projects of Israeli song and music. An evening of song to the words of 15 poems by the famous Israeli poet Rachel which Gilad composed, produced and directed together with his brother, Tommer Hesseg, was very successful resulting in some 60 theatre performances, as well as being broadcast on Israel Radio and T.V.

One of his most recent compositions set to the words of Annabel Lee by Edgar Allan Poe has been performed by the Concora Choir – Connecticut's Premier Professional Choir, Conducted by Maestro Richard Coffey and by the Jerusalem Academy of Music Chamber Choir Conducted by Maestro Stanley Sperber. The song was broadcast on Israel National Radio. Gilad studied with Prof. Shadai of the Tel-Aviv Academy of Music within the framework of a course for gifted student musicians given by Shadai at the Haifa Rubin Conservatorium of Music, and studied piano, improvisation, and music arrangement in Haifa with Ms Ruth Appel.

== Biography ==
Gilad was born on September 3, 1971, in the small town of Nesher near Haifa. He is the second of three sons. His elder brother – Doron Hesseg – is an IT professional. His younger brother – Tommer Hesseg – himself a well established musician, holds a master's degree from the Jerusalem Academy of Music and Dance and is a 3-year graduate of the Beit Zvi College for the Performing Arts. Tommer is Manager and Deputy Conductor of the Jerusalem Academy Chamber Music Choir and teaches music in various academies and colleges.

Gilad's parents were his initial introduction to the world of music and art. His Irish-born mother graduated from the Leinster School of Music in Dublin. His Polish-born father – as well as being a teacher – was an artist of Metal, Clay, and Wood. Gilad's flair for music became evident at a very early age. As a young child he played various musical instruments and at 16 began writing lyrics and composing songs.

Gilad was educated at the Nesher Comprehensive High-School where he was given his first opportunity to demonstrate his musical capabilities, performing for his school at most of the major functions. His military service in the Israeli Navy provided opportunities to sing and perform music for navy personnel leading to his first cover band with performances in major nightclubs throughout the country.

As well as his passion for music, Gilad displayed an avid interest in Sports and holds a Bachelor's Degree in Physical Education from the Wingate Institute. Prior to his present position at the Nesher Municipality he held a full-time position as Physical Education teacher and music instructor at the Nesher Comprehensive High-School where he himself was educated as a teenager.

== Personal life ==
In his private life, Gilad holds a master's degree in Public Auditing from the Faculty of Political Science, University of Haifa and currently holds the position of Internal Auditor for the Municipality of the town of Nesher, while continuing to pursue his career in music.

Gilad is married to Rinatia Maaravi, and they have two sons. They live on Mount Carmel in Haifa, where Gilad has his own recording studio.

== Discography ==
Studio albums

- Hidden Flame (2012)
