= John Maples =

British politician (1943–2012)

The Right Honourable The Lord Maples
- Official portrait, c. 2005

Economic Secretary to the Treasury
- In office 26 October 1989 – 10 April 1992
- Prime Minister: Margaret Thatcher; John Major
- Preceded by: Richard Ryder
- Succeeded by: Anthony Nelson
Shadow Cabinet posts
Shadow Foreign Secretary
In office 15 June 1999 – 2 February 2000
Leader	William Hague
Preceded by	Michael Howard
Succeeded by	Francis Maude
Shadow Secretary of State for Defence
In office 1 June 1998 – 15 June 1999
Leader	William Hague
Preceded by	George Young
Succeeded by	Iain Duncan Smith
Shadow Secretary of State for Health
In office 19 June 1997 – 1 June 1998
Leader	William Hague
Preceded by	Stephen Dorrell
Succeeded by	Ann Widdecombe
Parliamentary offices
Member of the House of Lords
Lord Temporal
Life peerage 24 June 2010 – 9 June 2012
Member of Parliament for Stratford-on-Avon
In office 1 May 1997 – 12 April 2010
Preceded by	Alan Howarth
Succeeded by	Nadhim Zahawi
Member of Parliament for Lewisham West
In office 9 June 1983 – 16 March 1992
Preceded by	Christopher Price
Succeeded by	Jim Dowd

Personal details
- Born: John Cradock Maples; 22 April 1943 Fareham, England
- Died: 9 June 2012 (aged 69) Westminster, London, England
- Party: Conservative
- Spouses: Lawry Kennedy (m. 1976; div. 1980) Jane Corbin (m. 1986)
- Children: 2 (by Corbin)
- Education: Marlborough College
- Alma mater: Downing College, Cambridge; Harvard University; City Law School
- Website: Official website

John Cradock Maples, Baron Maples (22 April 1943 – 9 June 2012) was a British politician and life peer who served as Economic Secretary to the Treasury from 1989 to 1992 and Shadow Foreign Secretary from 1999 to 2000. He is a former Deputy Chairman of the Conservative Party. He was Member of Parliament (MP) for Lewisham West from 1983 to 1992 and Stratford-upon-Avon from 1997 to 2010.

== Early life ==
John Cradock Maples was born at Fareham, Hampshire. His father, a businessman, lived in the Wirral; he was educated at Marlborough College, before going up to Downing College, Cambridge, where he read law, and played hockey for the college and performed with the Footlights. Maples received an MA in 1964, and later studied at the Harvard Business School. He was called to the Bar at the Inner Temple in 1965.

In the 1960s, Maples founded the Cayman Islands law firm of Maples and Calder with James MacDonald and Douglas Calder.

== Parliamentary career ==
=== 1983–1992: MP for Lewisham West ===
Maples was the MP for Lewisham West from 1983, until he lost the seat at the 1992 general election. His business background attracted him to the Treasury benches: Margaret Thatcher appointed him Parliamentary Private Secretary to Norman Lamont, then Economic Secretary to the Treasury. On Nigel Lawson's resignation in 1989, Lamont was made Chief Secretary to the Treasury, with Maples moving up to take Lamont's former role. During his time as Economic Secretary from 1989 to 1990, Maples was instrumental in working with David Cameron on the policy to enter the Exchange Rate Mechanism, with the pound sterling pegged designed to track the German deutschmark. In 1990, Maples had been appointed as Economic Secretary before the change of Prime Ministers. He dealt with the BCCI (Bank of Credit and Commerce International) case. The Arab bank was based in London, and fell prey to the subsequent Arms to Iraq scandals and collapsed, bankrupting its depositors. He was also responsible for monitoring the Bank of England's monetary policy, which included bank regulation.

At the 1992 general election he lost the Lewisham seat to Labour. He returned to the House of Commons at the following general election, in 1997; in the interim he was Chairman of Saatchi and Saatchi, the advertising and lobbying group, which had supported Thatcher.

=== 1997–2010: MP for Stratford-on-Avon ===
In 1995, after Stratford-upon-Avon MP Alan Howarth defected to Labour, Maples won the selection battle to replace him as Conservative candidate for the constituency, defeating local resident Maureen Hicks, former MP for Wolverhampton North East, who had likewise lost her seat in 1992. Maples went on to be elected for the seat, which was one of the Conservatives' safest, in 1997. He was re-elected in both the 2001 and 2005 general elections.

Maples was a member of William Hague's shadow cabinet from 1997 to 2000, holding the Health, Defence and Foreign Policy briefs in succession. While Shadow Foreign Secretary, he was caught apparently calling for Britain to help Vladimir Putin in the Second Chechen War, by saying that "because there is nothing we can do about it anyway."

In the reshuffle prompted by the return of Michael Portillo to the front bench, he lost his job to Francis Maude and left the shadow cabinet. Maples had been widely believed to be one of the main "plotters" behind the downfall of then Conservative party leader Iain Duncan Smith.

He returned to front bench politics in a minor reshuffle in November 2006, when David Cameron appointed him Deputy Chairman of the Conservative Party with responsibility for candidate selection. He replaced ex-shadow cabinet minister Bernard Jenkin. Because of Cameron's high-profile attempts to have more female and minority candidates selected, which met with some opposition from local parties, the post was seen as an important one. Maples was a Cameron loyalist, and elevated to the House of Lords in July 2010. While an MP, Maples was president of the Conservative Friends of Israel.

In the 2009 MP's expenses scandal it emerged that Maples had claimed the Royal Automobile Club as his principal residence though according to his obituary he immediately denied any wrongdoing. On 10 January 2010, Maples announced that he would stand down from the House of Commons at the general election which was held that May.

=== 2010–2012: Life peer ===
On 24 June 2010, in the Dissolution Honours List, Maples was created a Life Peer as Baron Maples, of Stratford-upon-Avon in the County of Warwickshire.

During a Lords debate on voting reform in November 2010, Lord Maples compared Lewisham West unfavourably with his other former constituency, Stratford-upon-Avon, stating that they "could not be more different". He claimed that Lewisham West was "three square miles of concrete", did not have an "identity", and that many of its constituents "did not know which borough they lived in". He added that Stratford-upon-Avon had a "very articulate" electorate and Lewisham West had "immigration and housing problems". Lord Maples was working on the Financial Services Bill from the joint Parliamentary Finance Committee.

== Personal life ==
Maples married designer Lawry Kennedy (1946–1982), who was one of the first people to renovate early 1900s brick townhouses to help gentrify abandoned and rundown areas in Boston in the United States, and London in England. They married on the Rhode Island oceanfront in July 1976; she divorced him in July 1980. He married journalist Jane Corbin in December 1986 in Westminster. The couple had a son (Tom, b. 1989) and a daughter (Rose, b. 1992).

Maples died at the Harley Street Clinic in Weymouth Street, Westminster, on 9 June 2012 from cancer, aged 69; his death was announced in the Lords by Baroness D'Souza.

Parliament of the United Kingdom
Preceded by Christopher Price	Member of Parliament for Lewisham West; 1983–1992	Succeeded by Jim Dowd
Preceded by Alan Howarth	Member of Parliament for Stratford-on-Avon; 1997–2010	Succeeded by Nadhim Zahawi
Political offices
Preceded by Richard Ryder	Economic Secretary to the Treasury; 1989–1992	Succeeded by Anthony Nelson
Preceded by Stephen Dorrell	Shadow Secretary of State for Health; 1997–1998	Succeeded by Ann Widdecombe
Preceded by George Young	Shadow Secretary of State for Defence; 1998–1999	Succeeded by Iain Duncan Smith
Preceded by Michael Howard	Shadow Foreign Secretary; 1999–2000	Succeeded by Francis Maude
