= Eyal Yanilov =

Israeli Krav Maga instructor (born 1959)

- Born: אייל ינילוב
- Nationality: Israeli
- Style: Krav Maga
- Teachers: Imi Lichtenfeld, Eli Avikzar
- Rank: Master Level 3 / Expert Level 8 in Krav Maga

Eyal Yanilov (Hebrew: אייל ינילוב; born 30 May 1959) is an Israeli Krav Maga instructor and currently Chief Instructor of Krav Maga Global. He was a co-founder and Chief Instructor of the International Krav Maga Federation from 1996 to 2010.

== Biography ==
Eyal Yanilov is a graduate of the School for Trainers and Instructors at the Wingate Institute for Sport and Physical Education and holds a degree in electrical engineering. He studied with the founder of Krav Maga, Imi Lichtenfeld (also known as Imi Sde-Or) beginning in 1974. He is one of two Krav Maga practitioners who holds the highest level granted by Imi Lichtenfeld, Master level 3 and the Founder's Diploma of Excellence, along with Darren Levine. Yanilov and Levine were the driving force in popularizing Krav Maga in the 1990s.

In 1981 Yanilov directed the first Krav Maga training seminar outside Israel and has introduced Krav Maga in 40 countries. He is the co-author of Krav Maga: How to Protect Yourself Against Armed Assault with a foreword written by former president of Israel, Shimon Peres. The book has been translated into six languages. From 1984 until Lichtenfeld's death in January 1998, Yanilov and Lichtenfeld worked together to compile a comprehensive manual on the principles of Krav Maga and its various techniques.

Until 2010, Yanilov served as head of the Professional Committee of the Israeli Krav Maga Association, established and served as the Chairman and Chief Instructor of the IKMF. In 2010 Eyal founded KMG — Krav Maga Global.

Eyal Yanilov was featured on an episode of Human Weapon, where he demonstrated disarming techniques of Krav Maga.

== Published works ==
- Sde-Or, Imi and Yanilov, Eyal. Krav Maga: How to Defend Yourself Against Armed Assault. New York: North Atlantic Books (2001). ISBN 1-58394-008-1
- Yanilov, Eyal and Boe, Ole. Krav Maga - Combat Mindset and Fighting Stress: How to Perform Under Alarming and Stressful Conditions (2020). ISBN 978-1782552031
