= Wingate test =

Anaerobic exercise test

The Wingate test (also known as the Wingate Anaerobic Test (WAnT)) is an anaerobic exercise test, most often performed on a stationary bicycle, that measures peak anaerobic power and anaerobic capacity. The test, which can also be performed on an arm crank ergometer, consists of a set time pedalling at maximum speed against a given resistance. The prototype test based on the Cumming’s test was introduced in 1974 at the Wingate Institute and has undergone modifications as time has progressed. The Wingate test has also been used as a basis to design newer tests in the same vein, and others that use running as the exercise instead of cycling. Sprint interval testing such as is similar to the construction of the Wingate test has been shown to increase both aerobic and anaerobic performance.

== Validity ==
To determine testing procedure validity, one must test the protocol against a "gold standard" trusted to elicit "true" values. In instances where there is such a standard, such as hydrostatic weighing to determine body composition, this is easy. There is however no such standard protocol for the determination of either anaerobic capacity or power. Due to this problem, the Wingate test has instead been compared with sport performance, sport specialty, and laboratory findings. These comparisons have determined that the Wingate test is measuring what it claims to measure, and is a good indicator of these measurements. Other references question the validity because the usual method of calculating the resistance of a brake band loaded with weights does not take into account all aspects of rope-brake theory and overestimates the actual force by 12–15%.

== Application ==
The Wingate test is believed to show two things: all-out peak anaerobic power and anaerobic capacity. These two values have been reported as important factors in sports with quick, all-out efforts. Short sprinting events rely heavily upon the anaerobic energy pathways during execution, which leads to speculation that greater performance in a Wingate test can predict success in these events. This has not been proven, and the more applicable theory would be that improvements in Wingate scores could predict improvements in sprinting times.

== Variations ==
The Wingate test has undergone many variations since its inception in the 1970s. Many researchers have used a 30-sec Wingate, while others have lengthened the duration to 60-sec or even 120-sec. The main purpose of this alteration is to more fully stress both the alactic and lactic anaerobic energy systems, which are the main source of energy for the first two minutes of exercise.

Another alteration that has been made is the repetition of Wingate tests. In current literature, this test has been repeated four, five, or even six times in one testing session. Repeating the Wingate test during training sessions can increase aerobic power and capacity, as well as maximal aerobic capacity.

The last common alteration is the workload during the test. The original Wingate test used a load of 0.075 kp per kg bodyweight of the subject. As these were young subjects, some suggest that adult subjects should use higher workloads, and several different loads have been used. Katch et al. used workloads of 0.053, 0.067, and 0.080 kp per kg bodyweight, while other researchers have increased the workload even higher, to 0.098 kp per kg bodyweight. The advantage of increasing the workload can show an increased, and therefore more representative, value for peak power in collegiate athletes. The workload can be altered, but a standard Wingate test still uses the original workload.

== Common testing procedure ==
Before the subject starts the Wingate test, they typically perform a low-resistance warm-up for at least five minutes to help minimize the risk of injury. During the warm-up the subject generally completes two or three 15 second “sprints” to make sure they are used to the fast movement before the test begins. On completing the warm-up the subject should rest for one minute, after which the test begins. The subject gets a five-second countdown to the beginning of the test, during which time they pedal as fast as they can. On the start of the test, the workload drops instantly (within three seconds if using a mechanical ergometer) and the subject continues to pedal quickly for 30 seconds.

An ergometer with an electromagnetic brake generally collects and displays data through a computer. With a mechanical ergometer, the researcher must count and record the number of revolutions pedaled for every five second interval during the test, and then determine power data. On test completion, the subject should pedal against low resistance in a cool-down phase.

The Wingate test can be completed on several types of bicycle ergometers, which can be controlled with either mechanical or electromagnetic brakes. If an ergometer with an electromagnetic braking system is used, it must be capable of applying a constant resistance. The most commonly used testing ergometer in the World is the Monark 894E Wingate testing ergometer.

== Relevant calculations ==
Peak Power (PP)

Ideally measured within the first 5 sec of the test, and is calculated by:

$P = \tfrac{F \times d}{t}$

where t is time in seconds. On an ergometer with mechanical brakes the force is the resistance (kg) added to the flywheel, while distance is:

$d = revolutions \times d_f$

where $d_f$ is the distance around the flywheel (measured in meters). Peak power values are given on a computer with electromagnetically braked ergometers. Power is expressed in Watts (W).

Relative Peak Power (RPP)

This allows for comparisons between people of varying sizes and body masses, and is calculated by:

$RPP = \tfrac{PP}{BW}$

where BW is body weight.

Anaerobic Fatigue (AF)

Anaerobic fatigue shows the percentage of power lost from the beginning to end of the Wingate. This is calculated by:

$AF = \tfrac{PP - LP}{PP}$

where PP is peak power and LP is lowest power.

Anaerobic Capacity (AC)

Anaerobic capacity is the total work completed during the test duration.

$\sum_{i=0}^n P_i$ where $P_i$ is power at any point starting at the beginning of the test (i) to the end (n).

== Testing considerations ==
Diurnal variations occur within the body in many forms, such as hormone levels and motor coordination, therefore it is important to consideration what effects may become apparent in Wingate testing. Recent studies have confirmed that circadian rhythms can significantly alter peak power output during a Wingate test. According to these studies, an early morning Wingate test elicits significantly lower peak power values than a late afternoon or evening Wingate test.

As in every physical exertion, several outside factors can play a role in Wingate performance. Motivation is present in almost every sporting event, and some believe that it can improve performance. Cognitive motivation has not been shown to influence Wingate performance; emotional motivation however has been found to improve peak power ratings. It is therefore suggested that all outside factors that involve emotion be standardized if possible in Wingate testing environments.

Another important outside factor is warm-up. According to some literature, a 15-minute intermittent warm-up improved mean power output by 7% while having no impact on peak values. These findings suggest that warm-up is an unimportant factor in peak power levels, but if mean power is the variable of interest it is important to standardize the warm-up.

Since the Wingate test stresses the anaerobic metabolic systems glucose consumption pre-testing can be another influential factor. The anaerobic energy systems use glucose as the primary energy source, and greater available glucose could influence the power output over short intervals. Therefore, glucose consumption prior to testing should be standardized between all participants.

Sampling rate can severely impact the values obtained for peak and average power output. Sampling rates consistent with a standard mechanical ergometer test show significantly lower peak and average power values than a test with much higher sampling rates in the computer data feeds. Furthermore, tests that use low sampling rates (< 2 Hz) tend to be less consistent than tests with high sampling rates. This suggests that a sampling rate of at least 5 Hz (0.2 sec) provides the most accurate results.

== Other uses ==
The Wingate test can also be used in training instances, especially in cyclists. In many races, cyclists finish the race with a sprint. This maximal exertion stresses anaerobic energy pathways. As Hazell et al. have demonstrated, training in this manner can increase aerobic and anaerobic performance. Since this method can increase anaerobic performance, many cycling athletes have taken to using repeated sprint intervals, such as the Wingate test, as training devices to increase performance in the final leg of the race. These Wingate tests may be slightly modified version of the standard test laid out above.

== See also ==
- Anaerobic training
- High-intensity interval training
