= Wingate Institute =

Sports training institute south of Netanya, Israel

- Hebrew: מכון וינגייט
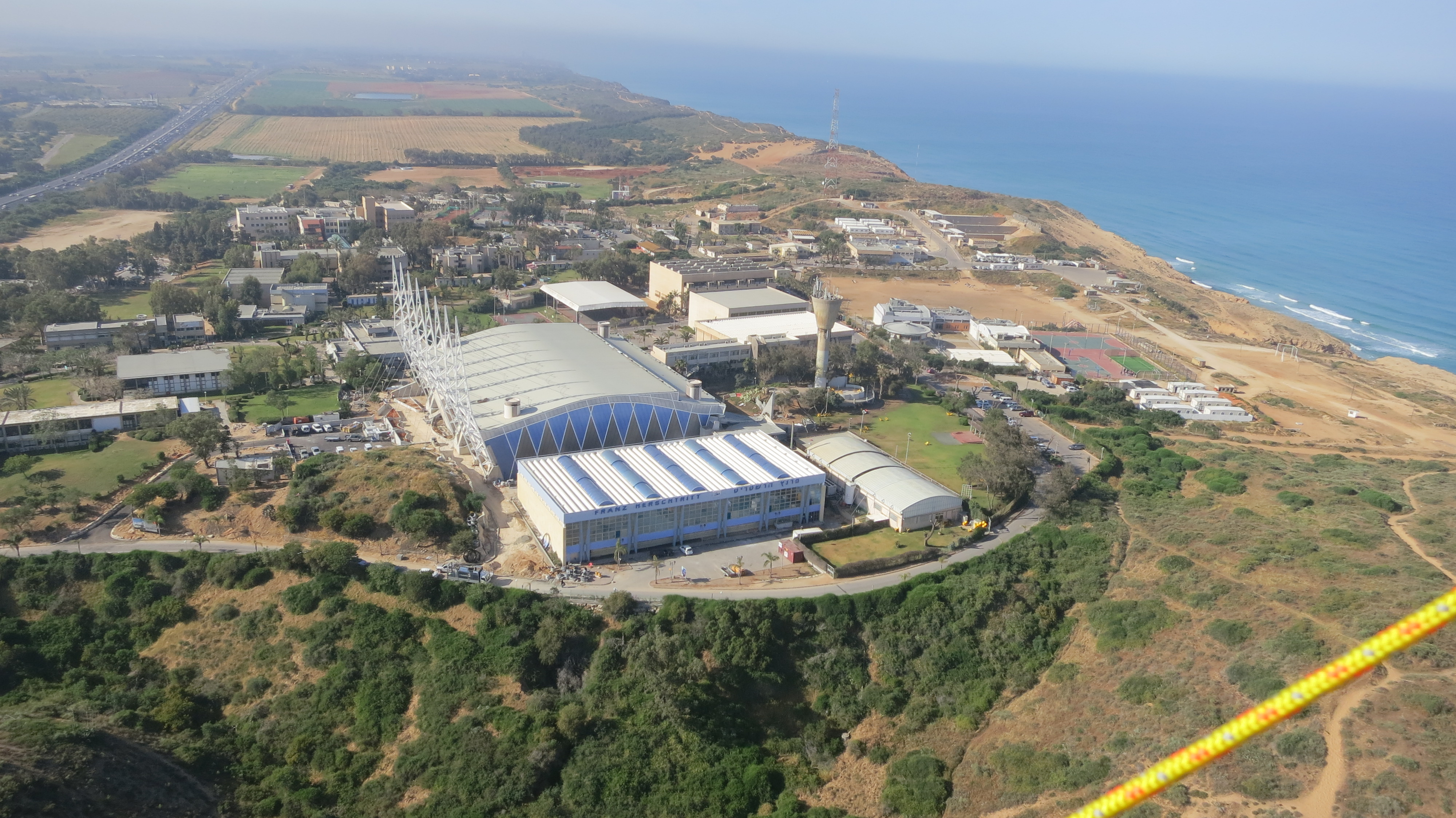
- Established: 1957; 69 years ago
- Location: Netanya, Israel

Wingate Institute (Hebrew: מכון וינגייט), officially Orde Wingate Institute for Physical Education and Sports (Hebrew: המכון לחינוך גופני ולספורט ע"ש אורד וינגייט), is a sports training institute located south of Netanya, Israel.

== History ==
Physical education at Wingate Institute, 1959

Wingate Institute was established in 1957. It was named after Orde Wingate. It serves as the host facility for several Israeli national sports teams and as a base for IDF fitness training. Among its numerous athletic fields is the rugby pitch that serves as the home pitch of the Israel national rugby union team. Additionally, numerous fields are used as venues during the Maccabiah Games.

In 1989, the institute was awarded the Israel Prize, for sport.

== Schools ==
- Nat Holman School for Coaches and Trainers (Hebrew: בית הספר למאמנים ומדריכים ע"ש נט הולמן)
- Ribstein Centre for Research, Sports Medicine and Physiotherapy (Hebrew: מרכז ריבשטיין לרפואת ספורט ולמחקר)
- International Jewish Sports Hall of Fame (Hebrew: היד לאיש הספורט היהודי)
- Turner Pedagogical Centre (Hebrew: המרכז הפדגוגי ע"ש טרנר)
- Cultivation of Young Talent in the Sport-Gifted Centre (Hebrew: המרכז לטיפוח מחוננים בספורט)
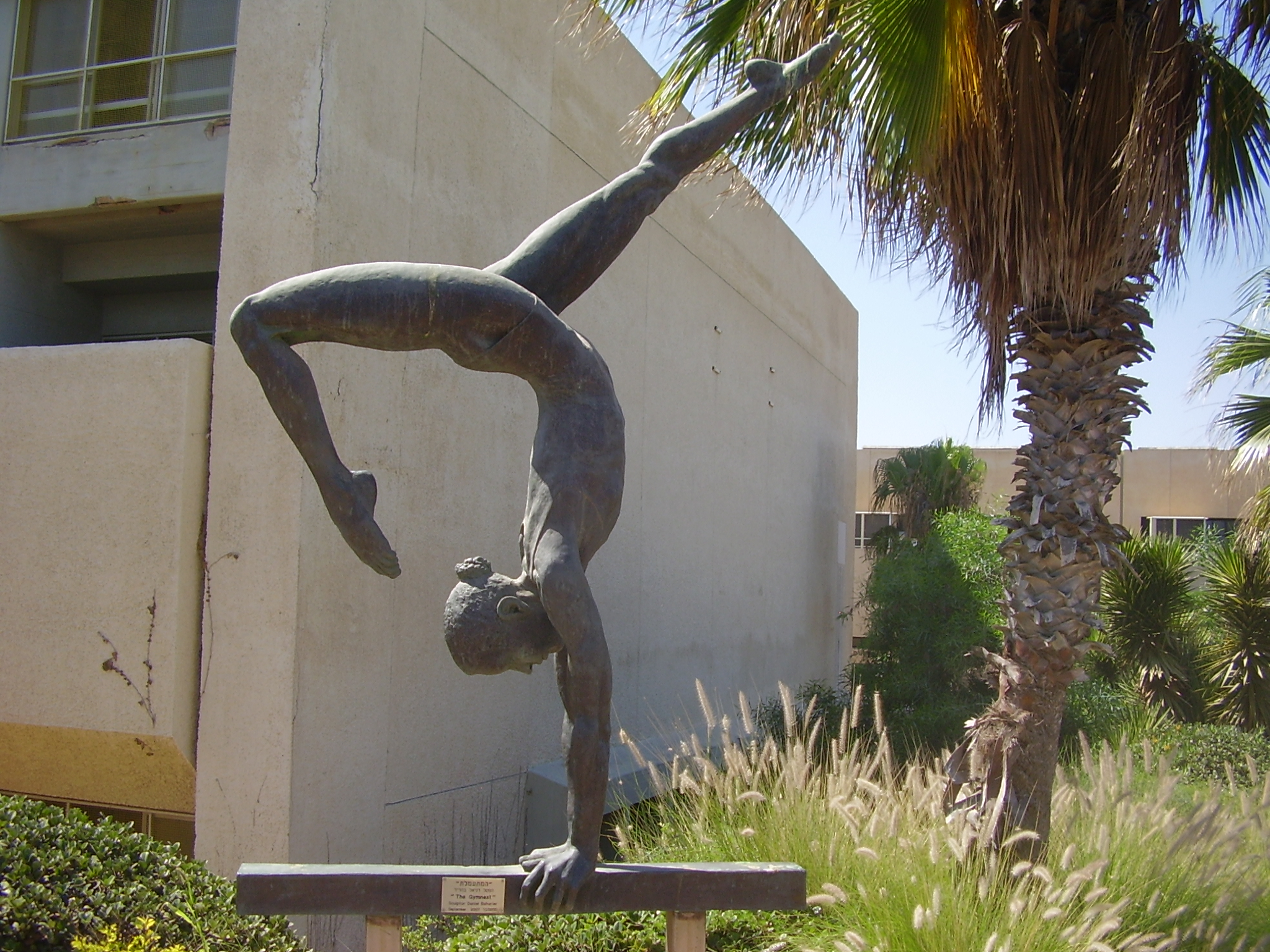
- Gymnast sculpture in Wingate Institute by Daniel Baharier
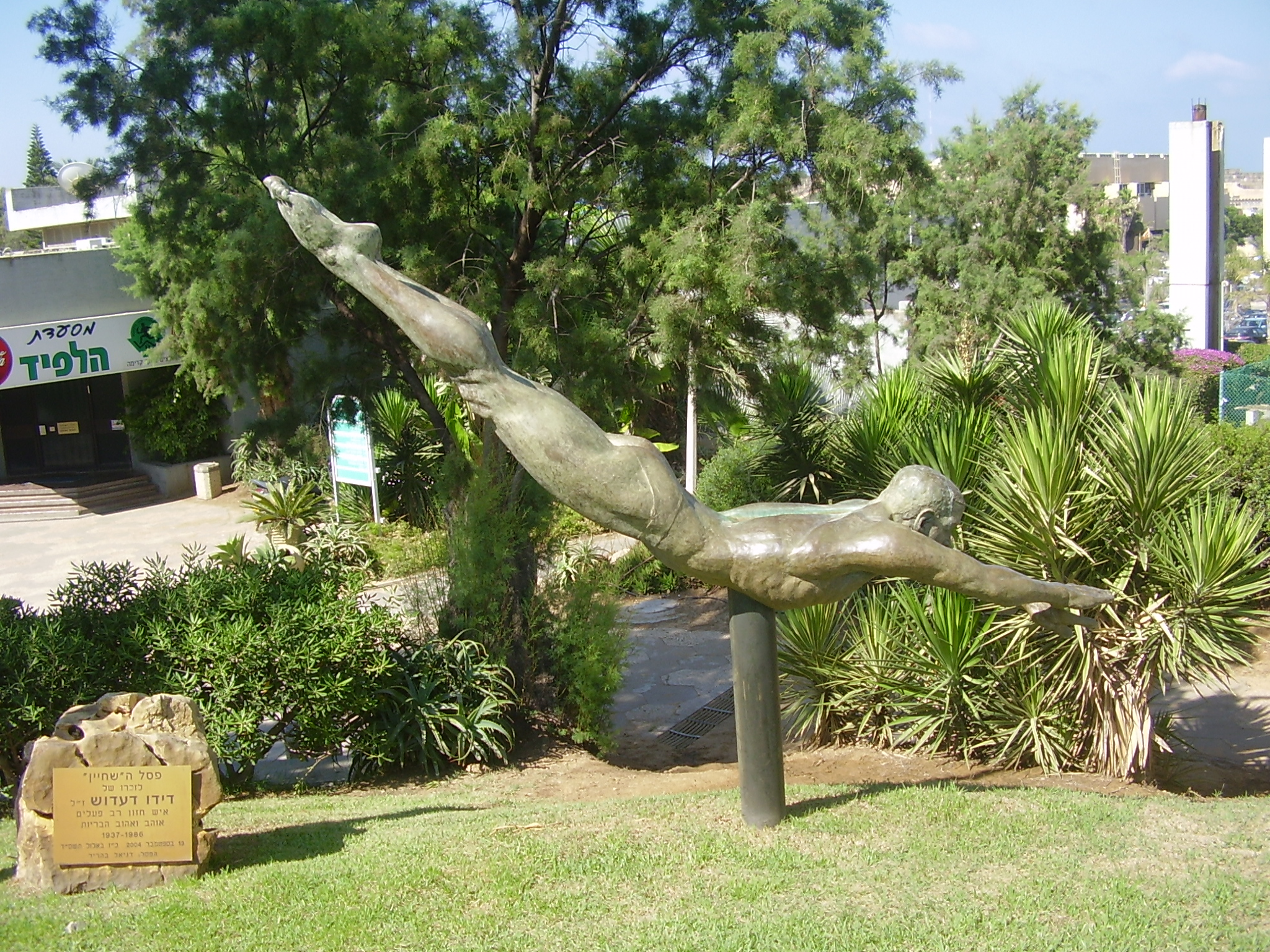
- Swimmer sculpture in Wingate Institute by Daniel Baharier
  Centre for the Development of Sports Achievement (Hebrew: יחידה לספורט הישגי)
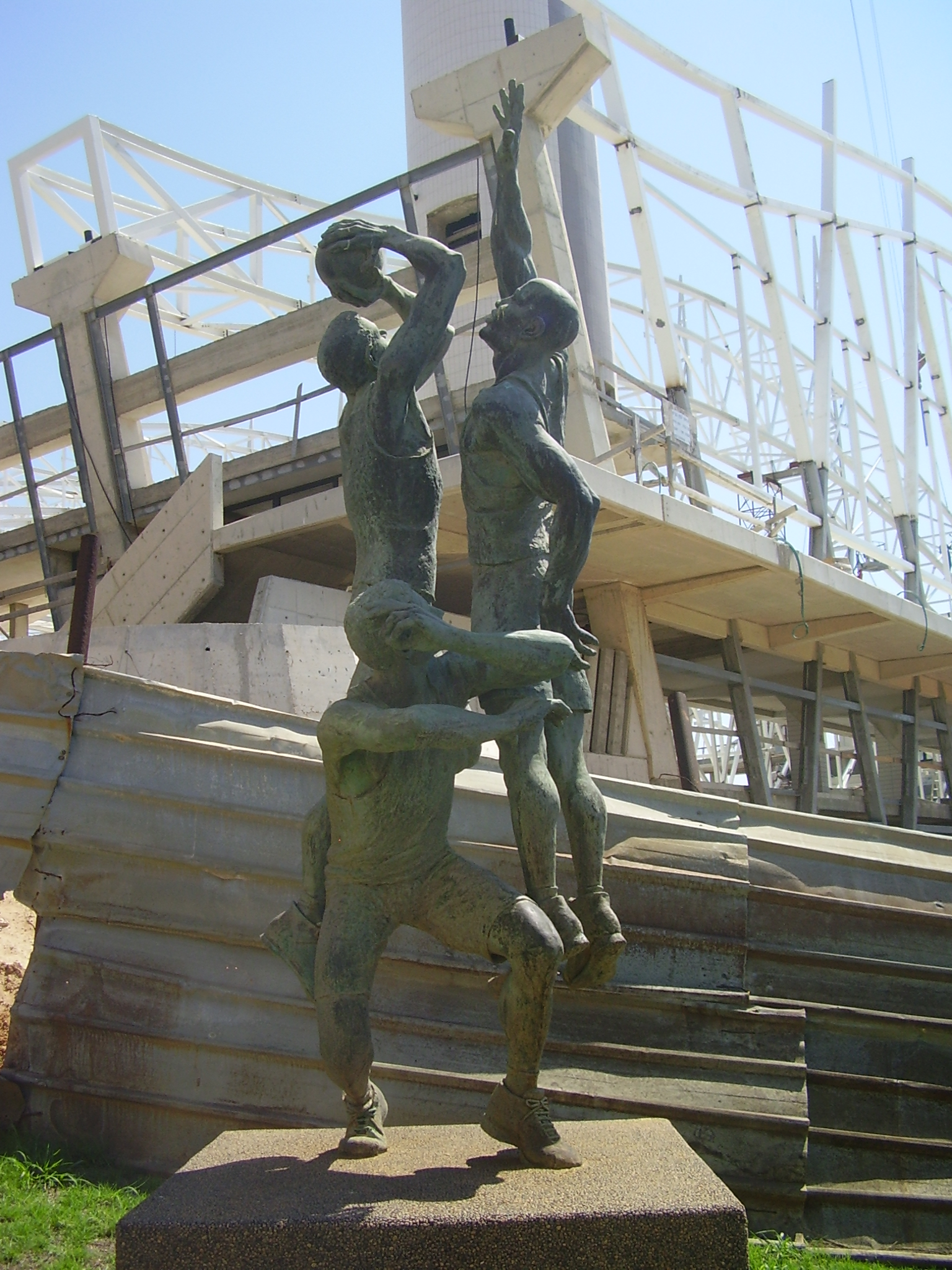
- Basketball sculpture in Wingate Institute By Daniel Baharier
  Headquarters for the Israeli Diving Federation

== Notable alumni ==
- Girmaw Amare (born 1987), Olympic runner
- Gideon Ariel (born 1939), Olympic competitor in the shot put and discus throw
- Mohamed Abu Arisha (born 1997), basketball player for Hapoel Be'er Sheva of the Israeli Basketball Premier League and the Israeli national basketball team
- Daria Atamanov (born 2005), Olympic rhythmic gymnast
- Aviv Barzelay (born 2002), Olympic swimmer
- Shani Bloch (born 1979), Olympic racing cyclist
- Maya Calé-Benzoor (born 1958), Olympic runner and long jumper
- Jon Dalzell, American-Israeli basketball player
- Artem Dolgopyat (born 1997), Olympic champion and world champion gymnast
- Adam Edelman (born 1991), American-born four-time Israeli National Champion in skeleton event, and Israeli Olympian
- Jonathan Erlich (born 1977), tennis player, ranked # 5 in world in doubles
- Yuval Freilich (born 1995), épée fencer, 2019 European Epee Champion
- Julia Glushko (born 1990), tennis player
- Anastasia Gorbenko (born 2003), Olympic swimmer, won the gold medal in the girls' 200 m individual medley at the 2018 Youth Olympic Games.
- Raz Hershko (born 1998), European champion and Olympic judoka
- Gilad Hesseg (born 1971), singer-songwriter
- Hussniya Jabara (born 1958), politician
- Maya Kalle-Bentzur (born 1958), Olympic runner and long jumper
- Inbar Lanir (born 2000), world champion and Olympic judoka
- Denis Loktev (born 2000), Olympic swimmer
- Adam Maraana (born 2003), swimmer
- Mikaella Moshe (born 2003), Olympic archer
- Nili Natkho (1982-2004), basketball player
- Tomer Or (born 1978), Olympic fencer and junior world champion
- Orna Ostfeld (born 1952), basketball player (scored world record 108 points) and coach
- Nina Pekerman (born 1977), triathlete
- Andy Ram (born 1980), tennis player, ranked # 5 in world in doubles
- Ran Sagiv (born 1997), Olympic triathlete
- Shachar Sagiv (born 1994), Olympic triathlete
- Idit Silman (born 1980), Knesset member
- Ofir Shaham (born 2004), Israeli team world champion rhythmic gymnast
- Derrick Sharp (born 1971), basketball player and coach
- Baruch Shmailov (born 1994), Olympic judoka
- Miriam Siderenski (born 1941), Olympic sprinter
- John Whitman (born 1967), author and Krav Maga instructor
- Eyal Yanilov (born 1959), Krav Maga instructor

== See also ==
- Sports in Israel
- Education in Israel
- List of Israel Prize recipients
- National Sport Center – Tel Aviv
- Wingate test
