= Imi Lichtenfeld =

Hungarian-born Israeli martial artist

Imi Lichtenfeld אימי ליכטנפלד
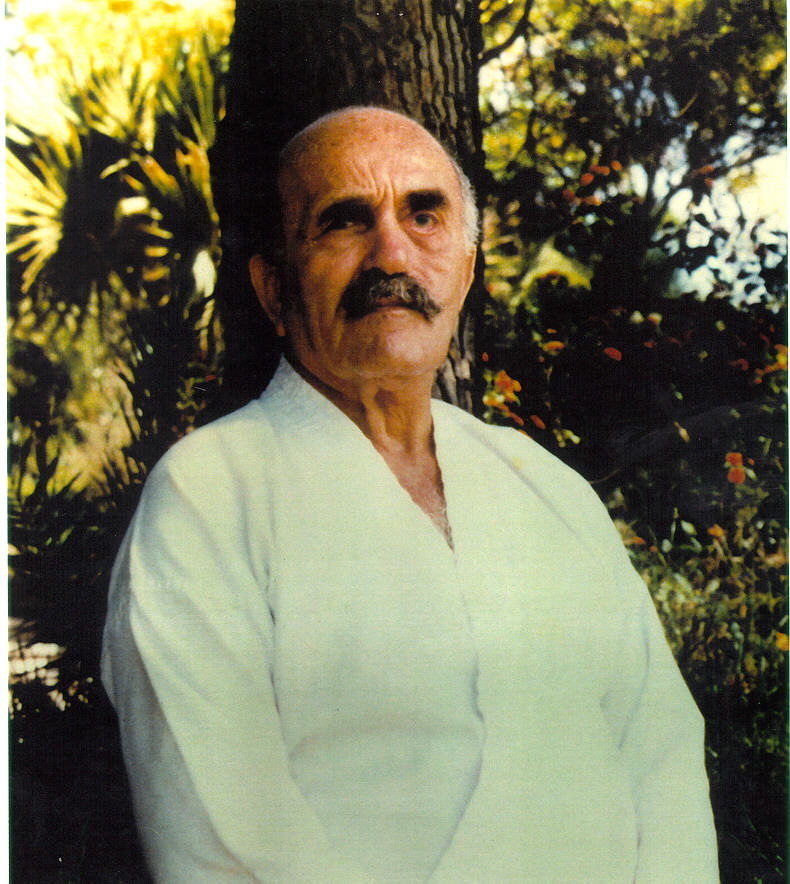
- Lichtenfeld in 1975
- Born: Imre Lichtenfeld; 26 May 1910; Budapest, Austria-Hungary
- Died: 9 January 1998 (aged 87); Netanya, Israel
- Nationality: Israeli
- Style: Krav Maga

Other information
- Notable students: Eyal Yanilov, Darren Levine, Haim Gidon

Gymnastics career
- Discipline: Men's artistic gymnastics

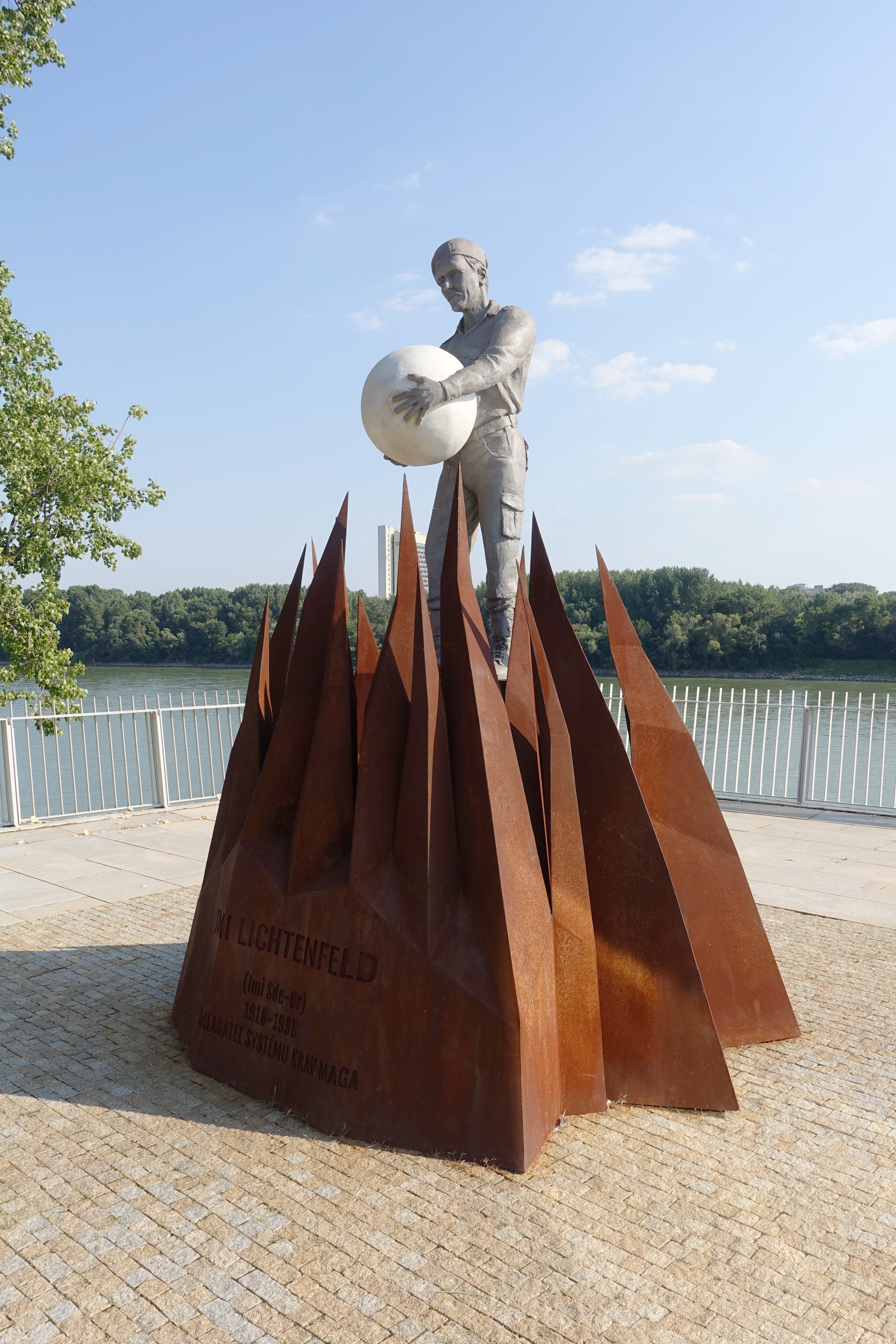
Imrich Lichtenfeld statue in Bratislava.

Imre "Imi" Lichtenfeld (Hebrew: אימריך "אימי" ליכטנפלד; Hungarian: Lichtenfeld Imre; 26 May 1910 – 9 January 1998), also known as Imi Sde-Or (אימי שדאור), was a Hungarian-born Israeli martial artist. He is widely recognized for developing Krav Maga, an Israeli martial art.

== Early life ==
Lichtenfeld was born on 26 May 1910 to a Hungarian Jewish family in Budapest in the Austro-Hungarian Empire. His family moved to Pozsony (present-day Bratislava), where his father, Samuel Lichtenfeld, was a chief inspector on the local police force and a former circus acrobat; he grew up there. Lichtenfeld trained at the Hercules Gymnasium, which was owned by his father, who taught self-defense.

Lichtenfeld was a successful swimmer, boxer, wrestler, and gymnast since his youth. He competed at national and international levels and was a champion and member of the Slovak National Wrestling Team. In 1928, he won the Slovak Youth Wrestling Championship, and in 1929, the adult championship in the light and middleweight divisions. That year, he also won the national boxing championship and an international gymnastics championship.

== Development of Krav Maga ==
In the late 1930s, antisemitic riots threatened the Jewish population of Bratislava in Europe. Together with other Jewish boxers and wrestlers, Lichtenfeld helped to defend his Jewish neighborhood against fascist gangs. He quickly realized that sport has little in common with real-life combat and began developing a system of techniques for practical self-defense in life-threatening situations.

In 1935, Lichtenfeld visited Mandatory Palestine with a team of Jewish wrestlers to participate in the Maccabiah Games, but could not participate because of a broken rib that resulted from his training while en route. This led to the fundamental Krav Maga precept, 'do not get hurt while training.' Lichtenfeld returned to Czechoslovakia to face increasing antisemitic violence. Lichtenfeld organized a group of young Jews to protect his community. On the streets, he acquired hard-won experience and a crucial understanding of the differences between sport fighting and street fighting. He developed his fundamental self-defense principle: 'use natural movements and reactions' for defense, combined with an immediate and decisive counterattack. From this evolved the refined theory of 'simultaneous defense and attack,' while 'never occupying two hands in the same defensive movement.'

In 1940, Lichtenfeld fled the rise of Nazism in Slovakia, heading for Palestine on the Aliyah Bet vessel, Pencho, which shipwrecked on the Dodecanese Islands in the Aegean Sea. He reached Palestine in 1942 after serving with distinction in the British supervised Czechoslovak 11th Infantry Battalion in North Africa. In 1944, Lichtenfeld began training Haganah fighters in his areas of expertise: physical fitness, swimming, wrestling, use of the knife, and defenses against knife attacks. During this period, he trained several elite units of the Haganah and Palmach (striking force of the Haganah and forerunner of the special units of the IDF), including the Pal-yam, as well as groups of police officers. In 1948, when the State of Israel was founded and the IDF was formed, Lichtenfeld became Chief Instructor for Physical Fitness and Krav Maga at the IDF School of Combat Fitness. He served in the IDF for about 20 years, during which time he developed and refined his unique method for self-defense and hand-to-hand combat. Lichtenfeld retired from the Israeli military in 1964.

== Later life ==
After he finished his active duty, Lichtenfeld modified Krav Maga to fit the needs of police forces and ordinary civilians. The method was formulated to suit everyone—man and woman, boy or girl—who might need it to survive an attack while sustaining minimal harm. To disseminate his method, Lichtenfeld established two training centers, one in Tel Aviv and the other in Netanya. He trained teams of Krav Maga instructors, who were accredited by him and the Israeli Ministry of Education. He also created the Israeli Krav Maga Association (IKMA) on 22 October 1978 and the International Krav Maga Federation in 1995. On 9 January 1998, Lichtenfeld died in Netanya, Israel, at the age of 87. He is buried at Netanya Shikun Vatikim Cemetery on Section פ.

== Bibliography ==
- Lichtenstein, Kobi. Lichtenstein, Sandra. Krav Maga: o Legado de Imi Lichtenfeld. ISBN 978-6586485066.
- Lo Presti, Gaetano. Krav Maga Borè srl, 2013. ISBN 978-8891103352.
- Lo Presti, Gaetano. Imi Lichtenfeld – The Grand Master of Krav Maga Borè srl, 2015. ASIN B00VXZXG7K.

== See also ==
- Yehoshua Sofer, the martial artist who conceived the Abir martial art (2002)
