= Jane Corbin =

British journalist and film-maker

- Occupation: Journalist
- Spouse: John Maples (died)

Jane Phillipa Corbin (born 16 July 1954) is a British journalist and film-maker who has made over a hundred documentaries mainly for the BBC and its current affairs programme Panorama. She specialises in covering Central Asia, the Middle East and terrorism and has investigated many of the major human rights issues and global political and military events over the past three decades.

== Early life ==
She originated in Devon. Her father was Aubrey Corbin, a test pilot who married Olive Amery, his second wife. She has a sister born in 1958.

Her mother was from Moretonhampstead. Her father was from Portsmouth, and trained with de Havilland. He was an airline pilot until 1939, then a test pilot for Airspeed, known for their gliders. Her parents moved to Kenya 1957, then worked for the High Commissioner for the Western Pacific. Her maternal uncles were John Amery, who was executed in 1945, and the Conservative MP Julian Amery (1919-96) who was Minister for Aviation from 1962-64. Her half-sister Elizabeth Corbin married Edward Theodore Thring (1930-2022), grandson of Sir Arthur Thring, in October 1959 at Chelsea Old Church. Edward Thring was later the school bursar of Rendcomb College in Gloucestershire, in the 1980s. From this marriage, one of her half-nieces (born 1960) married Francis Mander, brother of Sir Nicholas Mander. John Alexander, brother of Henry Templer Alexander, married the sister of her father's first wife from Portsmouth, Anne Rump, at Sheet, Hampshire, in April 1943.

Corbin was educated at King's College London, graduating with a degree in English in 1975.

== Career ==
She was part of the first intake of new journalists to be employed by Channel 4 News before its launch in November 1982. While with ITN Corbin covered major news events such as the siege of the Holy Sikh Temple at Amritsar in June 1984 and interviewed Indira Gandhi just before she was assassinated by her Sikh bodyguards. Corbin reported on the miners' strike in the same year. and accompanied Benazir Bhutto on her return to Pakistan in 1982.

Since joining the BBC's current affairs programme Panorama in 1988, Corbin has made over a hundred documentaries working as a reporter in war zones and as an investigative journalist in general for the BBC. She has specialised in making films about Al-Qaeda since 1998, when she was one of the first reporters to identify the threat from Osama bin Laden in Death to America.

Corbin has reported extensively from the Middle East covering the conflict between Israel and the Palestinians, including her inside account of the negotiations that led to the Oslo Peace Accords in 1993. She has reported extensively from the West Bank and Gaza covering the conflict - for example in the films 'The War of the Tunnels' in Gaza in 2014 and 'Price Tag Wars' on the activities of right-wing teenagers in Israel whom their own government calls 'terrorists'. Corbin reported from Iraq during the first Gulf War in 1991–92 when she reported on the existence of Saddam Hussein's secret nuclear weapons programme and his Supergun.

== Since 2000 ==
During the Iraq War of 2003, Corbin gained exclusive access to the United Nations weapons inspectors as they searched for the elusive Weapons of Mass Destruction in Iraq. After filming the British forces' invasion and taking of Basra she was again given access to the coalition Iraq Survey Group as they searched fruitlessly for the WMDs that had been used to justify the war.

Corbin has reported extensively from Afghanistan and from Pakistan making programmes about the Taliban, women's rights and the war against militants on both sides of the border. She covered the hunt for Bin Laden in Afghanistan and Pakistan and made a one-hour documentary for BBC1, Hostage, on Al-Qaeda's tactic of hostage-taking in Iraq. She investigated the network of the 'father of the Islamic bomb', Dr A.Q. Khan, in The Nuclear Super Market (2004) and later reported from the tribal area of Waziristan on the impact of America's secret drone war in Pakistan. In The Death of Bin Laden (2011) she revealed how the CIA finally tracked down and killed the fugitive leader of the terror group.

In 2011 and 2012, Corbin covered the uprisings in the Middle East known as the Arab Spring, reporting from Tahrir Square in Cairo as Hosni Mubarak was toppled as Egypt's president. Her report from Syria of human rights abuses against children and women in the town of Dera'a resulted in cases being brought before the International Court of Justice against members of President Bashar al-Assad's regime.

On 1 October 2014, BBC Two broadcast Rwanda: The Untold Story, a documentary presented by Corbin, which contained a controversial account of the Rwandan genocide In particular, it presented evidence alleging President Paul Kagame was involved in shooting down the plane of his predecessor Juvénal Habyarimana, an event which is partly blamed for causing the 1994 genocide. According to expert witnesses on the programme, this involved the killing of millions of ethnic Hutus, not mainly Tutsis as some research has shown. On 24 October 2014, the Rwandan government suppressed the BBC's broadcasts in Kinyarwanda, one of the country's main languages, in Rwanda.

In 2015, in "Iraq: The Final Judgement" at the time of the Chilcot Report into the causes and impact of the Iraq War, Corbin re-visited the places and people - from Basra to Baghdad - she had filmed over a decade of reporting on the coalition's war. In 2016 in a BBC film "Kill the Christians" she charted the destruction of Christian communities by ISIS, the Islamic State across the Middle East from Iraq to Syria and their exodus to Iraqi Kurdistan and the Lebanon. Corbin has investigated the rise of the Islamic State and the western vulnerabilities it has identified - for example in her film 'Terror on the Beach" on the attack by a 'lone wolf' on tourists in Tunisia.

In 2017, Corbin presented a documentary on the Balfour Declaration, signed a hundred years before, which led to the creation of the state of Israel and the conflict that ensued between Zionist immigrants and the Palestinian natives. In November 2018, Corbin wrote and presented a major investigation into the Russian Novichok nerve agent attack in Salisbury on the former Russian spy, Sergei Skripal and his daughter Yulia. Detective Sergeant Nick Bailey of Wiltshire police, also poisoned in the attack, gave Corbin an exclusive interview in this film which examined the part played by the GRU, the Russian state and President Vladimir Putin in the attack. In April 2019, Corbin's film for the BBC "The Shadow Commander" investigated the role played in many wars and intelligence led operations in the Middle East by the powerful Commander of the Quds Force of the Revolutionary Guard of Iran - General Qasem Soleimani. She predicted that he would be a major target for the Americans - Suleimani was eliminated by a US strike in Iraq nine months later.

Corbin has been reporting in 2020 on the COVID-19 pandemic in the United Kingdom for Panorama and her documentary "On the NHS Frontline" recounts how a hospital in the hotspot of the Midlands coped with COVID-19 during the peak of the epidemic.

Corbin has won the Royal Television Society Award on three occasions and is a former Emmy Award nominee. She has given expert testimony before various Committees of the House of Commons on Afghanistan, Pakistan and Iraq and also on Al-Qaeda. She has written two books, Gaza First and Al Qaeda: the terror network that threatens the world.

== Personal life ==
Corbin has two children from her marriage to the late Conservative MP and peer Lord Maples, who died in 2012.
