= Krav Maga =

Israeli self-defense system

- קְרַב מַגָּע
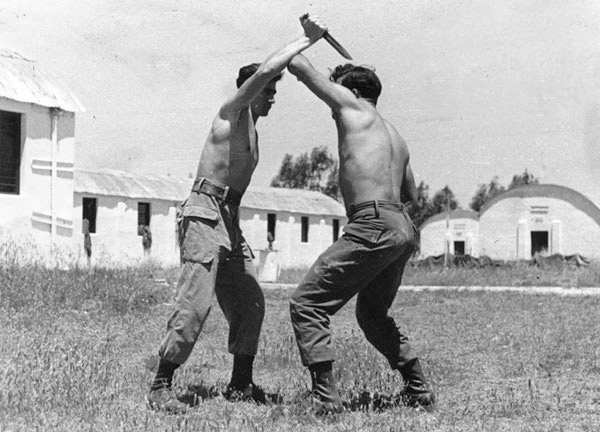
- Krav Maga course at an Israeli paratroopers school in 1955
- Focus: Hybrid
- Country of origin: Israel
- Creator: Imi Lichtenfeld
- Parenthood: Aikido, Boxing, Judo, Karate, Wrestling
- Olympic sport: No

Krav Maga (/ˌkrɑːv məˈɡɑː/ KRAHV mə-GAH; Hebrew: קְרַב מַגָּע, IPA: [ˈkʁav maˈɡa]; lit. 'contact combat') is an Israeli self-defence system. Developed for the Israel Defense Forces (IDF), it is known for its focus on real-world situations.

Krav Maga was originally developed by Hungarian-born Israeli martial artist Imi Lichtenfeld. Having grown up in Bratislava during a time of antisemitic unrest, Lichtenfeld used his training as a boxer and wrestler to defend Jewish neighborhoods against attackers in the mid-to-late 1930s, becoming an experienced street fighter. After his immigration to Mandatory Palestine in the late 1940s, he began to provide lessons on combat training to Jewish paramilitary groups that would later form the IDF during the 1948 Palestine war. As an instructor, he compiled his knowledge and experience into the combat system that would later become known as Krav Maga. This system would continue to be taught long after he left the IDF.

From the outset, the original concept of Krav Maga was to take the most effective and practical techniques of other fighting styles (originally European boxing, wrestling, and street fighting) and make them rapidly teachable to conscripted soldiers. It has a philosophy emphasizing aggression and simultaneous defensive and offensive maneuvers. It has been used by Israeli special forces and regular infantry units alike. Closely related variations have been developed and adopted by Israeli law enforcement and intelligence organizations, and there are several organizations teaching variations of Krav Maga internationally. There are two forms of Krav Maga, with one type adapted for Israeli security forces and the other type adapted for civilian use.

== Etymology ==
The term krav maga in Hebrew is literally translated as 'contact combat' – the three letter root of the first word is q-r-b (קרב), and the noun derived from this root means either "combat" or "battle", while the second word is a participle form derived from the verb root n-g-‘ (נגע), that literally means either "contact" or "touch".

== Basic principles ==
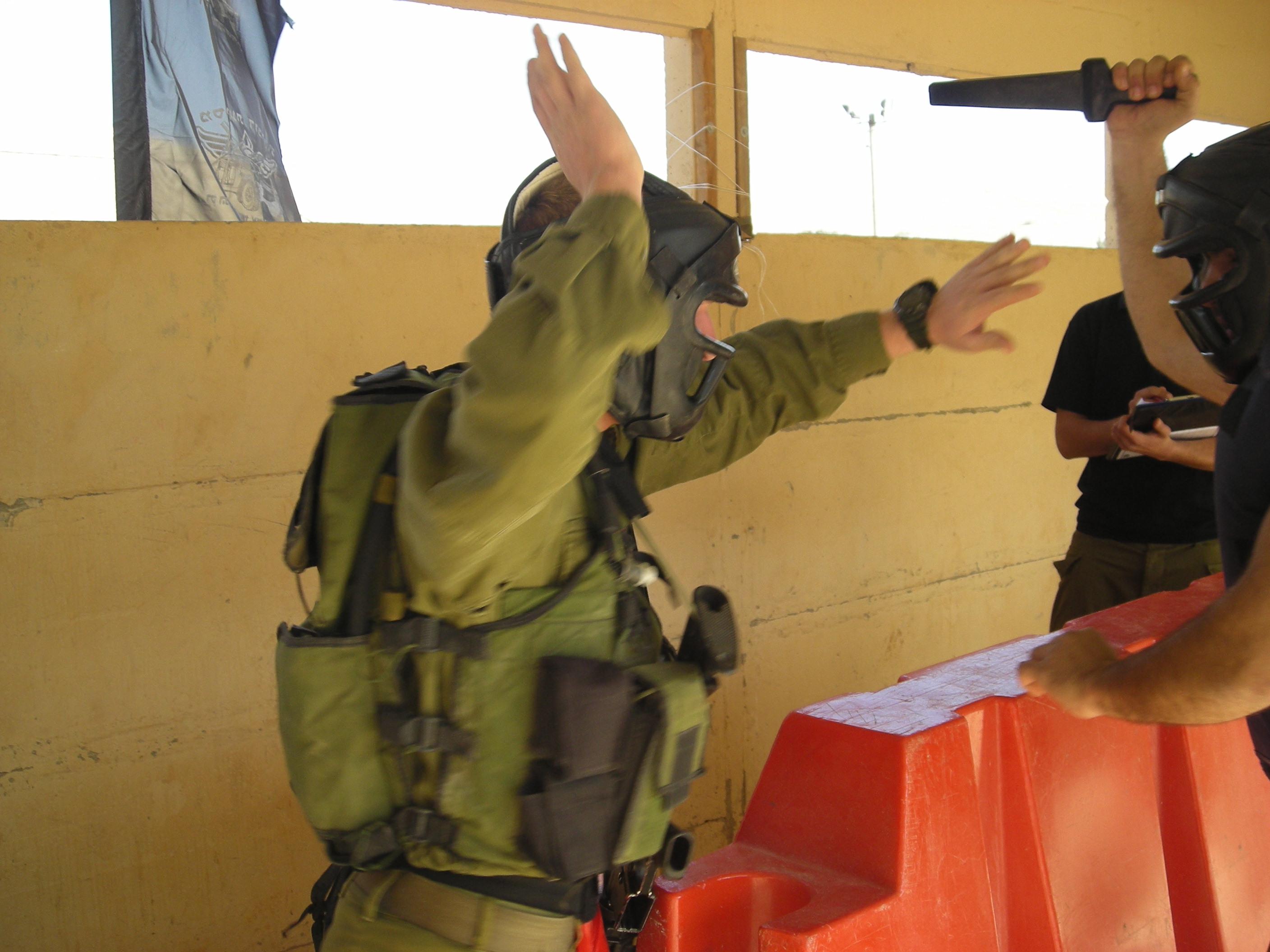
IDF soldier sparring in full combat gear

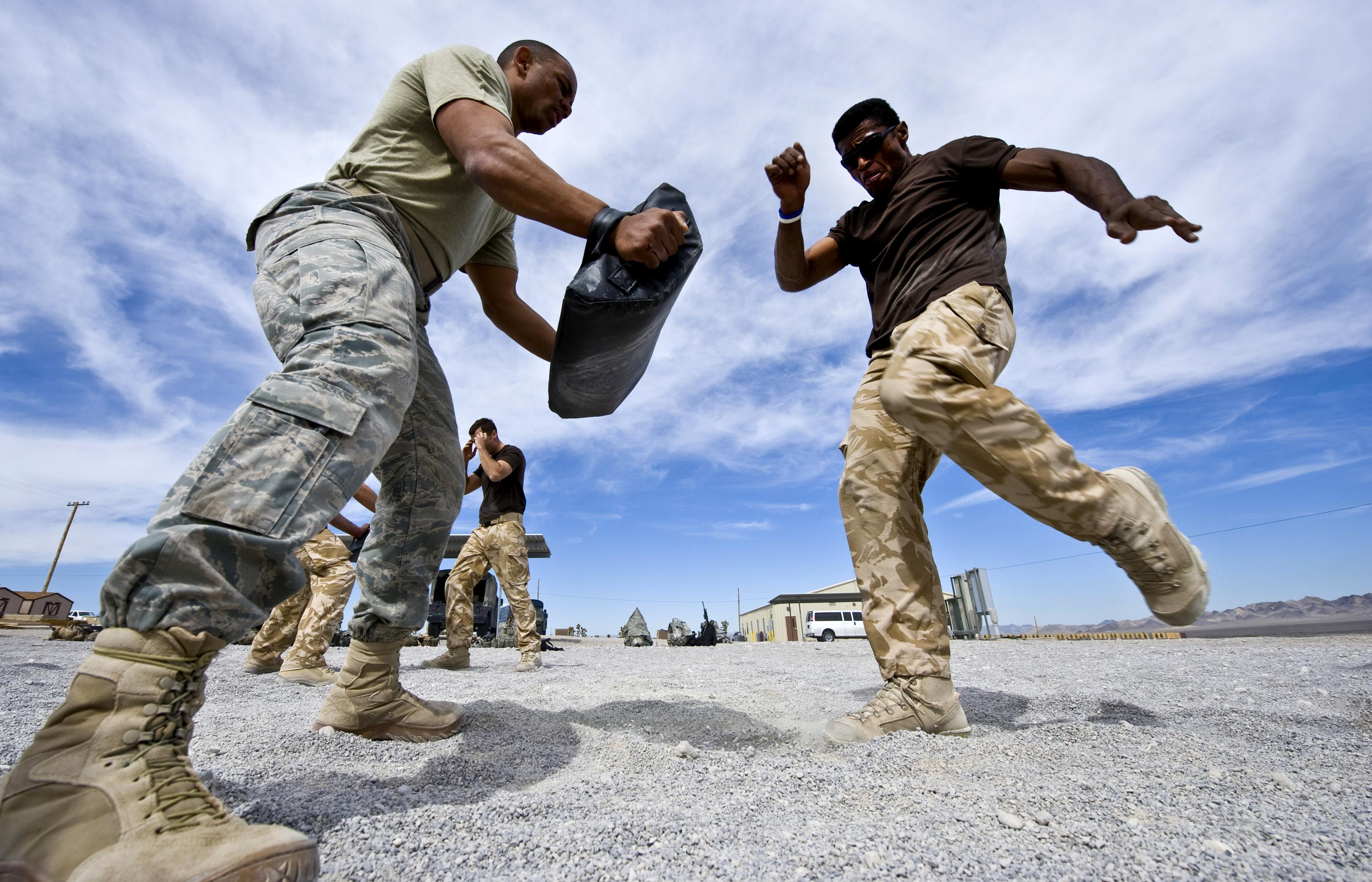
US Air Force and British Royal Air Force security personnel during Krav Maga training.

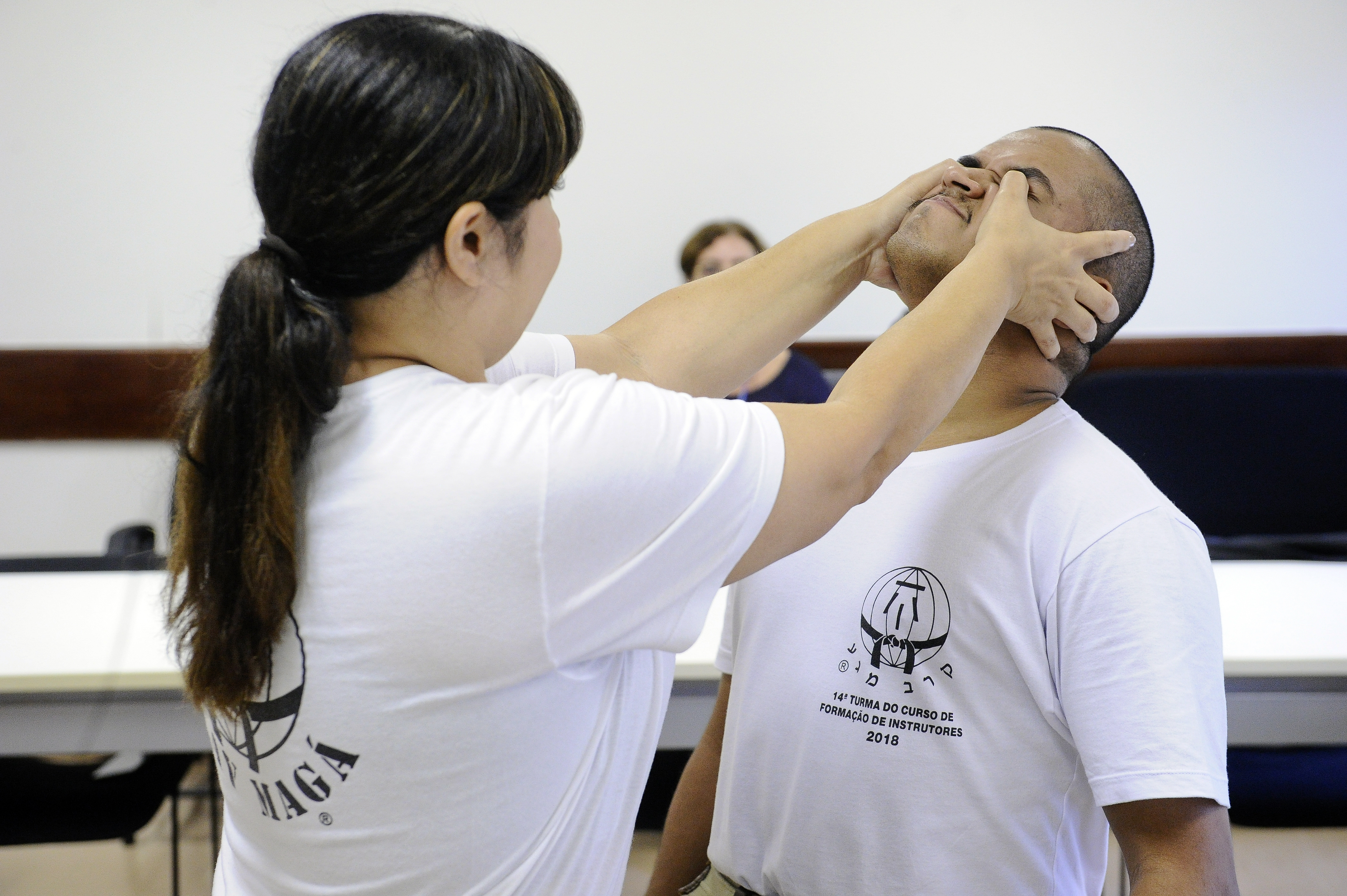
An instructor demonstrates Krav Maga technique

Like most martial arts, Krav Maga encourages students to avoid physical confrontation. If this is impossible or unsafe, it promotes finishing a fight as quickly and aggressively as possible. Attacks are aimed at the most vulnerable parts of the body, and training is not limited to techniques that avoid severe injury; some even permanently injure or kill the opponent.

Students learn to defend against a variety of attacks and are taught to counter efficiently.

Ideas in Krav Maga include:

- Simultaneous defense and attack.
- Developing physical aggression (not to be confused with emotional aggression or anger), with the view that physical aggression is the most important component in a fight
- Continuing to strike the opponent until they are completely incapacitated
- Attacking preemptively or counterattacking as soon as possible
- Using any objects at hand that could be used to hit an opponent
- Targeting attacks to the body's most vulnerable points, such as the eyes, neck or throat, face, solar plexus, groin, ribs, knee, foot, fingers, liver, etc.
- Using simple and easily repeatable strikes
- Maintaining awareness of surroundings while dealing with the threat in order to look for escape routes, further attackers, or objects that could be used to strike an opponent
- Developing muscle memory for quicker fighting reaction
- Recognizing the importance of and expanding on instinctive response under stress

Training can also cover the study and development of situational awareness to develop an understanding of one's surroundings, learning to understand the psychology of a street confrontation, and identifying potential threats before an attack occurs. It may also cover physical and verbal methods to avoid violence whenever possible. It also teaches mental toughness, using controlled scenarios to strengthen mental fortitude in order for students to control the impulse and not do something rash, but instead attack only when necessary and as a last resort.

== Techniques ==
Media footage demonstrating Krav Maga techniques to deal with assailants in mock combat using multiple different types of weapons; namely a pole, a knife, a pistol, a rifle and hand-to-hand.

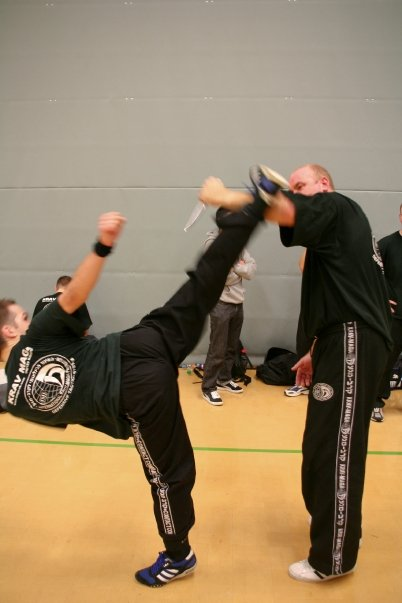
Krav Maga training

Some of the key focuses of techniques in Krav Maga are—as described above—effectiveness and instinctive response under stress. To that end, Krav Maga is an eclectic system that has not sought to replace existing effective techniques, taking what is useful from available systems, for example:

- Strikes – as per karate and boxing
- Takedowns and throws – as per judo, aikido and wrestling
- Ground work – as per judo and wrestling
- Escapes from chokes and holds – as per judo, aikido and wrestling
- Empty-hand weapon defenses – as per aikido

Since the early 21st century, a number of Krav Maga schools have introduced technical influences from other arts as well. These include Brazilian jiu-jitsu, Arnis/Kali/Escrima and Silat. This reflects Krav Maga's attitude, across a multitude of lineages, as an ever-evolving style, which continues to borrow ideas and methods from other martial arts.

== History ==
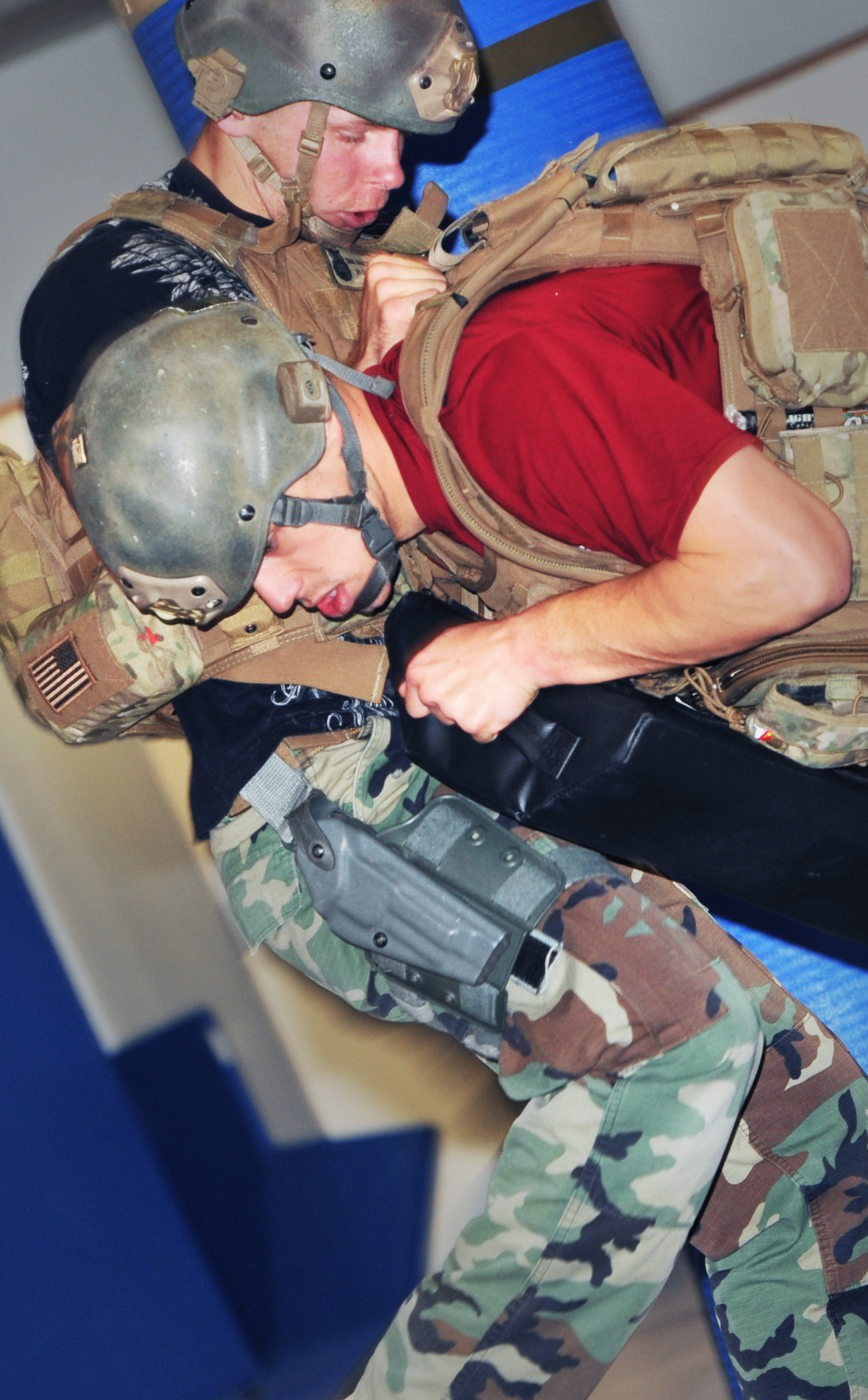
US Air Force Security forces members during Krav Maga training.

Imre "Imi" Lichtenfeld (also known as Imi S'de-Or) was born in 1910 in Budapest, Austro-Hungary to a Jewish family and grew up in Pozsony, today's Bratislava (Slovakia). Lichtenfeld became active in a wide range of sports, including gymnastics, wrestling, and boxing. In 1928, Lichtenfeld won the Slovak Youth Wrestling Championship, and in 1929 the adult championship (light and middle weight divisions). That same year, he also won the national boxing championship and an international gymnastics championship. During the ensuing decade, Lichtenfeld's athletic activities focused mainly on wrestling, both as a contestant and a trainer.

In the mid-1930s, antisemitic riots began to threaten the Jews of Bratislava, Czechoslovakia. Lichtenfeld became the leader of a group of Jewish boxers and wrestlers who took to the streets to defend Jewish neighborhoods against the growing numbers of antisemitic Nazis. Lichtenfeld quickly discovered, however, that actual fighting was very different from competition fighting, and although boxing and wrestling were good sports, they were not always practical for the aggressive and brutal nature of street combat. It was then that he started to re-evaluate his ideas about fighting and started developing the skills and techniques that would eventually become Krav Maga. Having become a thorn in the side of the equally antisemitic local authorities, in 1940 Lichtenfeld left his home with his family and friends on the last refugee ship to escape Europe.

After making his way to Mandatory Palestine, Lichtenfeld joined the Haganah paramilitary organization. In 1944, Lichtenfeld began training fighters in his areas of expertise: physical fitness, swimming, wrestling, use of the knife, and defense against knife attacks. During this period, Lichtenfeld trained several elite units of the Haganah, including the Palmach (striking force of the Haganah and forerunner of the special units of the Israel Defense Forces) and the Palyam, as well as groups of police officers.

In 1948, when the State of Israel was founded and the IDF was formed, Lichtenfeld became Chief Instructor for Physical Fitness and Krav Maga at the IDF School of Combat Fitness. He served in the IDF for about 20 years, during which time he developed and refined his unique method for self-defense and hand-to-hand combat. Self-defense was not a new concept, since nearly all martial arts had developed some form of defensive techniques in their quest for tournament or sport dominance. However, self-defense was based strictly upon the scientific and dynamic principles of the human body. In 1965 judo training was added as part of the Krav Maga training. Until 1968 there were no grades in Krav Maga. Then a trainee's grades were determined largely by his knowledge in judo.

In 1968, Eli Avikzar, one of Lichtenfeld's principal students and first black belt, began learning aikido. In 1971, Eli left for France, where he received a black belt in aikido. Upon his return, Avikzar started working as an instructor alongside Imi to integrate more traditional martial arts into Krav Maga. Then in 1974 Imre retired and gave Eli Avikzar control over the Krav Maga training center in Netanya. Shortly after, in 1976, Avikzar joined the permanent force of IDF, as head of the Krav Maga section. The role of Krav Maga in the army advanced greatly after Eli's appointment. More courses were given, and every P.E. instructor was obliged to learn Krav Maga. Avikzar continued to develop Krav Maga within the IDF until his retirement in 1987. Up to this date, Eli had trained 80,000 male soldiers and 12,000 female soldiers.

Further pursuing excellence as a student of martial arts, Eli went to Germany in 1977 and received a black belt in aikido from the European Federation. In 1978, the Krav Maga association was established, and in 1989, as an active member of the judo association, Eli Avikzar helped to contribute to the general development of professional and rank committees within the larger Krav Maga community by founding the Israeli Krav Magen Association (KAMI). KAMI is a parallel discipline to the original Krav Maga. Eli retired as the Chief Krav Maga instructor in 1987 and Boaz Aviram became the third person to hold the position, being the last head instructor to have studied directly with both Lichtenfeld and Avikzar.

== Israel Defense Forces ==
The IDF offers a five-week Krav Maga instructor course. It has held an annual Krav Maga competition since May 2013.

== Civilian use ==
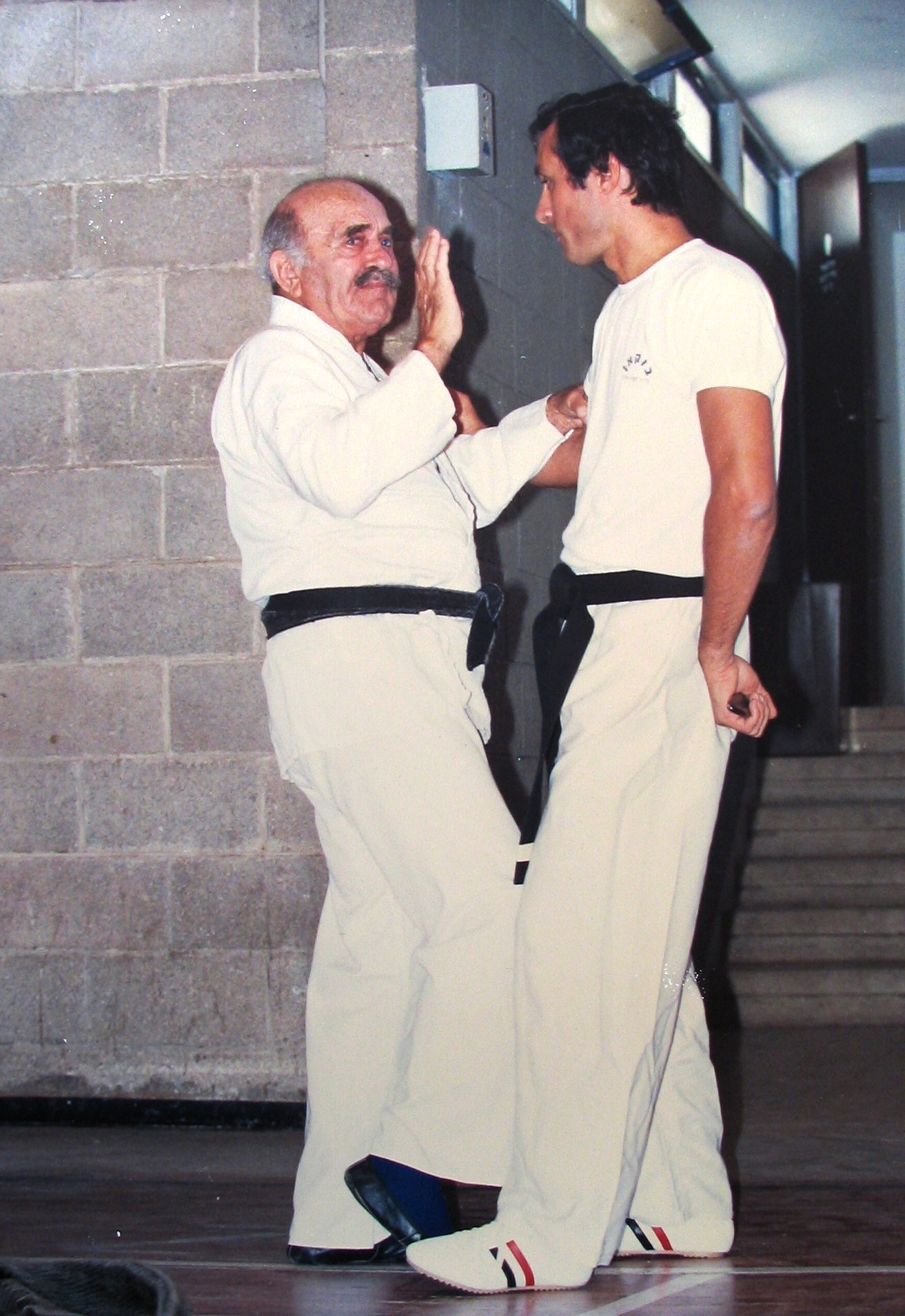
Krav Maga Grand Master Imi Lichtenfeld and Yaron Lichtenstein

Upon Imi Lichtenfeld's retirement from the IDF, he decided to open a school and teach Krav Maga to civilians. The first Krav Maga course took place at the Wingate Institute, Netanya, Israel, in 1971, under his direct supervision.

=== Grading system ===
Most of the Krav Maga organizations in Israel use Imi Lichtenfeld's colored belt grading system which is based upon the Judo ranking system. It starts with a white belt, and then yellow, orange, green, blue, brown and black belts. Black belt students can move up the ranks from 1st to 9th Dan. The time and requirements for advancing have some differences between the organizations.

Other organizations that teach Krav Maga in and outside of Israel use similar grading systems.

A patch system was developed by Eyal Yanilov in the late 1980s. The grades are divided into three main categories: Practitioner, Graduate and Expert. Each of the categories, which are often abbreviated to their initials, has five ranks. Grades P1 through to P5 are the student levels and make up the majority of the Krav Maga community. After P5 are G1–G5, and in order to achieve Graduate level the student has to demonstrate a proficiency in all of the P-level techniques before advancing.

Belt colors and IKMF patches
White	Yellow	Orange	Green	Blue	Brown	Black

Although there are some subtle differences, the various organizations teach the same core techniques and principles. Some other organizations have less formal grading ranks without belts or patches but do have levels by which students can monitor their progress.

=== Sparring ===
In some organizations, sparring is slow and light until the student reaches G2 level. This takes approximately four to six years, because rising one level in the Practitioner and Graduate categories takes at minimum half a year of consistent training. It is, however, more common to observe regular trainees grading only once a year from P3 and up.

Once in G2, students also practice simulated "real" fighting with protective gear.

== In popular media ==
- Krav Maga was represented in the UFC by former IDF soldier Moti Horenstein. He fought Mark Coleman at UFC 10 and Mark Kerr at UFC 14, losing decisively each time. Both Coleman and Kerr were NCAA Division I wrestling champions and would go on to win their respective tournaments.
- Jennifer Lopez trained in Krav Maga for her role in Enough, and the martial art was featured in the story.
- Leonardo DiCaprio trained in Krav Maga for his role in Blood Diamond, where he played a Rhodesian-South African smuggler and mercenary.
- Jessica Chastain trained in Krav Maga for her role in The Debt, and the martial art was featured in fight scene choreography.
- Tom Cruise trained in Krav Maga for fight choreography in Jack Reacher.
- Daniel Craig trained in Krav Maga for fight choreography as James Bond in Spectre.
- Emily Blunt trained in Krav Maga for fight choreography in Edge of Tomorrow.
- Sean Penn trained in Krav Maga for fight choreography in The Gunman.
- The Grand Theft Auto IV protagonist, Niko Bellic, uses Krav Maga in physical combat.

== See also ==
- Close-quarters combat
- Combatives
- Defendu
- Jieitaikakutōjutsu
- Kapap
- Marine Corps Martial Arts Program
- Sambo (martial art)
  - ARB (martial art)
