= 2026 British shadow cabinet reshuffle =

UK shadow cabinet reshuffle

Kemi Badenoch carried out a reshuffle of her shadow cabinet following the 2026 summer recess. It was expected to be the most drastic reshuffle since she took office as Leader of the Conservative Party and Leader of the Opposition in 2024, the reshuffle came following reports of discontent on the backbenches, and a perceived need to remove underperforming frontbenchers.

The sitting of parliament resumed on Tuesday 1 September 2026 following the summer recess. Badenoch previously reshuffled the shadow cabinet in July 2025.

== Background ==
On 29 August 2026, James Cleverly resigned from the shadow cabinet. He intends to stand in the 2028 London mayoral election.

The reshuffle was carried out on 31 August 2026, ahead of Parliament returning the following day. This was amid reports of a possible snap election, though Prime Minister Andy Burnham had previously ruled out calling an early election.

== Changes ==
=== Shadow Cabinet ===
Colour key
- Joined the Shadow Cabinet
- Left the Shadow Cabinet

| Shadow Minister | Position(s) before reshuffle | Position(s) after reshuffle | Ref. |
|---|---|---|---|
| James Cleverly MP | Shadow Secretary of State for Housing, Communities and Local Government | Backbench MP | |
| Priti Patel MP | Shadow Foreign Secretary | Backbench MP | |
| Tom Tugendhat MP | Backbench MP | Shadow Foreign Secretary | |
| Stuart Andrew MP | Shadow Secretary of State for Health and Social Care | Backbench MP | |
| Mel Stride MP | Shadow Chancellor of the Exchequer | Backbench MP | |
| Andrew Griffith MP | Shadow Secretary of State for Business and Trade | Shadow Chancellor of the Exchequer | |
| Claire Coutinho MP | Shadow Secretary of State for Energy Security and Net Zero | Shadow Secretary of State for Business, Innovation, Science and Trade | |
| Joy Morrissey MP | Opposition Deputy Chief Whip in the House of Commons | Shadow Minister for Women and Equalities | |
| Katie Lam MP | Opposition Assistant Whip | Shadow Secretary of State for Housing, Communities and Local Government | |
| Rebecca Paul MP | Opposition Assistant Whip | Shadow Secretary of State for Digital, Culture, Media and Sport | |
| Andrew Bowie MP | Shadow Secretary of State for Scotland | Shadow Secretary of State for Energy Security and Net Zero | |
| Harriet Cross MP | Opposition Assistant Whip | Shadow Secretary of State for Scotland | |
| Julia Lopez MP | Shadow Secretary of State for Science, Innovation and Technology | Shadow Secretary of State for Business, Innovation, Science and Trade (maternity cover for Claire Coutinho) | |
| Damian Hinds MP | Backbench MP | Shadow Secretary of State for Health and Social Care | |
| Nigel Huddleston MP | Shadow Secretary of State for Culture, Media and Sport | Backbench MP | |
| Alex Burghart MP | Shadow Chancellor of the Duchy of Lancaster; Shadow Secretary of State for Northern Ireland | Deputy Leader of the Opposition; Deputy Leader of the Conservative Party; Shadow Chancellor of the Duchy of Lancaster; Shadow Secretary of State for Northern Ireland | |

=== Notes ===
- Julia Lopez will cover for Claire Coutinho, who is on maternity leave until January 2027.
- Richard Fuller remains Shadow Chief Secretary to the Treasury

=== Junior changes ===
| Shadow Minister | Position(s) before reshuffle | Position(s) after reshuffle | Ref. |
|---|---|---|---|
| Jack Rankin | Parliamentary Private Secretary for Justice | Parliamentary Private Secretary to the Leader of the Opposition | |
| Charlie Dewhirst | Shadow Parliamentary Private Secretary to the Cabinet Office | Shadow Minister for the Union (Cabinet Office) Junior Opposition Whip | |
| Stuart Anderson | Backbench MP | Shadow Minister of State for Defence | |
| Ben Obese-Jecty | Backbench MP | Shadow Parliamentary Under-Secretary of State for Defence | |
| Blake Stephenson | Parliamentary Private Secretary to the Treasury | Shadow Parliamentary Under-Secretary of State for the Home Office Junior Opposition Whip | |
| Sarah Bool | Parliamentary Private Secretary to the Home Office | Shadow Parliamentary Under-Secretary of State for Justice and Home Office Junior Opposition Whip | |
| Jerome Mayhew | Shadow Minister of State for Transport | Shadow Solicitor General | |
| John Cooper | Parliamentary Private Secretary for Scotland | Shadow Exchequer Secretary to the Treasury Junior Opposition Whip | |
| Peter Bedford | Backbench MP | Shadow Parliamentary Under-Secretary of State for Pensions | |
| Ben Spencer | Shadow Minister for Science, Innovation and Technology | Shadow Minister for AI (Cabinet Office) | |
| Alicia Kearns | Shadow Home Office Minister | Shadow Minister of State for Foreign Affairs and the Home Office | |
| Lincoln Jopp | Parliamentary Private Secretary for the Foreign Office | Parliamentary Under-Secretary of State for Foreign,Commonwealth and Development Affairs Opposition Assistant Whip | |
| David Reed | Parliamentary Private Secretary for Defence | Shadow Parliamentary Under-Secretary of State for Foreign, Commonwealth and Development Affairs and Defence Senior Opposition Whip | |
| Harriett Baldwin | Shadow Minister of State for Business, Innovation, Science and Trade | Shadow Paymaster General and Minister for the Taxpayer | |
| Mark Garnier | Shadow Economic Secretary to the Treasury and Shadow Parliamentary Under-Secretary of State for Work and Pensions | Shadow Minister of State for Business, Innovation, Science and Trade and Shadow Economic Secretary to the Treasury | |
| Bradley Thomas | Backbench MP | Shadow Parliamentary Under Secretary of State for Business, Innovation, Science and Trade Junior Opposition Whip | |
| Peter Fortune | Backbench MP | Shadow Parliamentary Under Secretary of State for Business, Innovation, Science and Trade | |
| Rebecca Smith | Junior Opposition Whip | Shadow Parliamentary under Secretary of State for Education Senior Opposition Whip | |
| Patrick Spencer | Backbench MP | Shadow Parliamentary under Secretary of State for Education Junior Opposition Whip | |
| Greg Stafford | Junior Opposition Whip | Shadow Parliamentary under Secretary of State for Health and Social Care Senior Opposition Whip | |
| Andrew Snowden | Junior Opposition Whip | Shadow Minister of State for Work and Pensions | |
| Joe Robertson | Backbench MP | Shadow Parliamentary Under-Secretary of State for Work and Pensions Junior Opposition Whip | |
| Luke Evans | Shadow Minister for Health and Social Care | Shadow Minister of State for Energy Security and Net Zero | |
| Ashley Fox | Junior Opposition Whip | Shadow Parliamentary Under-Secretary of State for Energy Security and Net Zero Senior Opposition Whip | |
| Aphra Brandreth | Parliamentary Private Secretary for Environment, Food and Rural Affairs | Shadow Parliamentary Under-Secretary of State for Environment, Food and Rural Affairs Junior Opposition Whip | |
| Lewis Cocking | Parliamentary Private Secretary for Department for Housing, Communities and Local Government | Shadow Parliamentary Under-Secretary of State for Housing, Communities and Local Government Junior Opposition Whip | |
| Alison Griffiths | Parliamentary Private Secretary for Business and Trade | Shadow Parliamentary Under-Secretary of State for Transport Junior Opposition Whip | |
| James Wild | Shadow Exchequer Secretary to the Treasury | Shadow Minister of State for Digital, Culture, Media and Sport | |
| Douglas Lumsden | Backbench MP | Parliamentary Private Secretary for the Scotland Office | |
| Paul Holmes | Shadow Minister for Housing, Communities and Local Government | Opposition Deputy Chief Whip | |
| Helen Grant | Shadow Solicitor General | Backbench MP | |

== Analysis ==
The shadow ministerial changes were called a "significant reshuffle" by BBC News. Those positions which changed included senior roles such as Shadow Chancellor of the Exchequer and Shadow Foreign Secretary. Members on both the tory right and one-nation factions were promoted.

== See also ==
- 2025 British shadow cabinet reshuffle
- 2023 British shadow cabinet reshuffle
- November 2021 British shadow cabinet reshuffle
- May 2021 British shadow cabinet reshuffle
- 2016 British shadow cabinet reshuffle
