= Claire Coutinho =

British politician (born 1985)

The Right Honourable Claire Coutinho MP
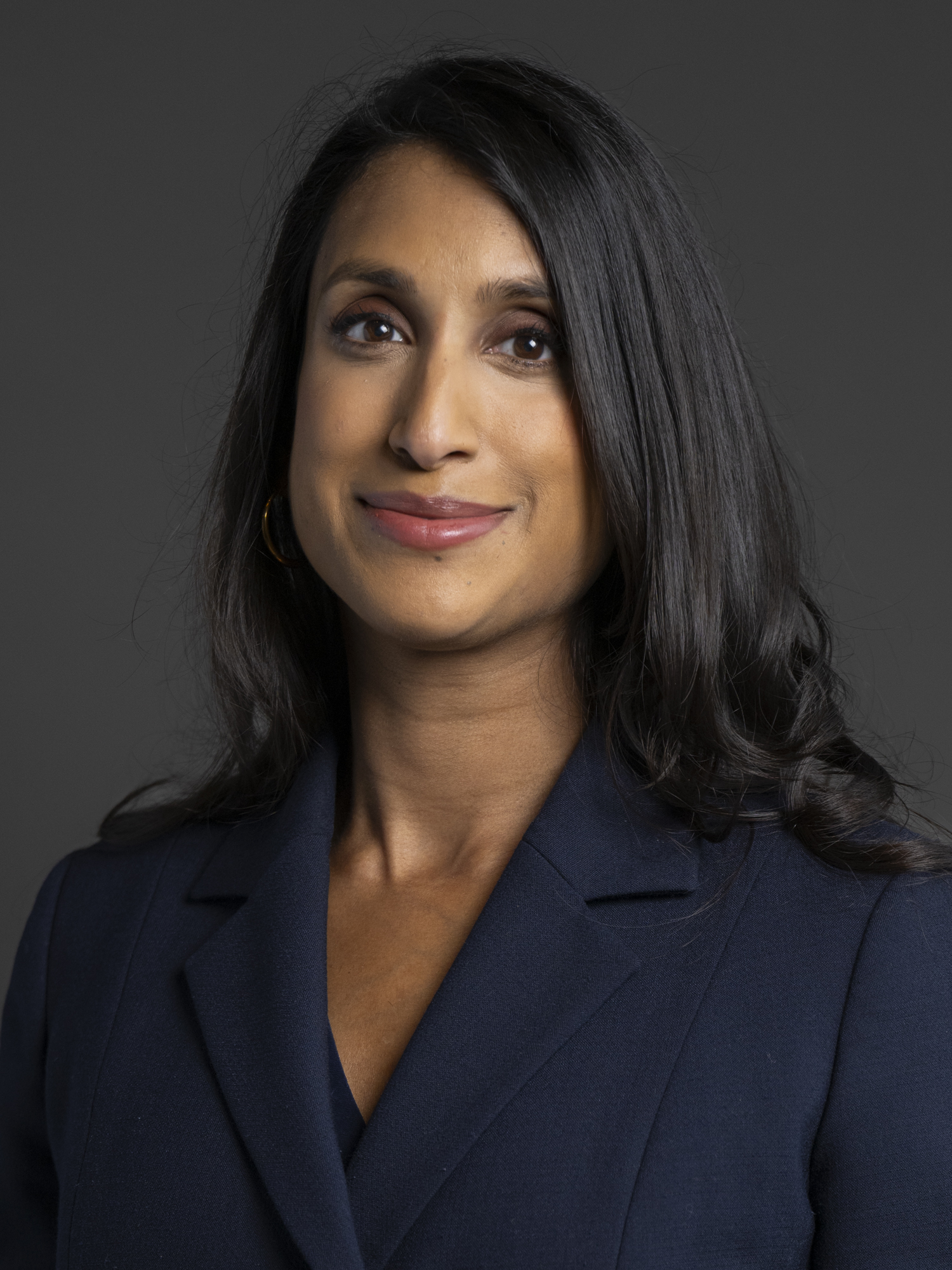
- Official portrait, 2024

Shadow Secretary of State for Business, Innovation, Science and Trade
- Incumbent
- Assumed office 31 August 2026 (Note: Currently on Maternity leave, Julia Lopez is serving in her place until January 2027)
- Leader: Kemi Badenoch
- Preceded by: Andrew Griffith (Business and Trade); Julia Lopez (Science and Innovation)

Shadow Secretary of State for Energy Security and Net Zero
- In office 8 July 2024 – 31 August 2026
- Leader: Rishi Sunak; Kemi Badenoch
- Preceded by: Ed Miliband
- Succeeded by: Andrew Bowie

Shadow Minister for Equalities
- In office 5 November 2024 – 31 August 2026 Serving with Mims Davies
- Leader: Kemi Badenoch
- Preceded by: Mims Davies
- Succeeded by: Joy Morrissey

Secretary of State for Energy Security and Net Zero
- In office 31 August 2023 – 5 July 2024
- Prime Minister: Rishi Sunak
- Preceded by: Grant Shapps
- Succeeded by: Ed Miliband
Junior ministerial offices
Parliamentary Under-Secretary of State for Children, Families and Wellbeing
In office 28 October 2022 – 31 August 2023
Prime Minister	Rishi Sunak
Preceded by	Kelly Tolhurst
Succeeded by	David Johnston
Parliamentary Under-Secretary of State for Disabled People, Health and Work
In office 21 September 2022 – 28 October 2022
Prime Minister	Liz Truss
Preceded by	Chloe Smith
Succeeded by	Tom Pursglove

Member of Parliament for East Surrey
- Incumbent
- Assumed office 12 December 2019
- Preceded by: Sam Gyimah
- Majority: 7,450 (15.1%)

Personal details
- Born: Claire Coryl Julia Coutinho; 8 July 1985 (age 41) London, England
- Party: Conservative
- Spouse: Adam Hawksbee (m. 2025)
- Children: 1
- Education: Exeter College, Oxford (BA)
- Website: www.clairecoutinho.com

Claire Coryl Julia Coutinho (/kəˈtiːnoʊ/; born 8 July 1985) is a British politician and former investment banker who has been Shadow Secretary of State for Business, Innovation, Science and Trade since 2026. A member of the Conservative Party, she has been the Member of Parliament (MP) for East Surrey since 2019. Coutinho previously served in the Cabinet as Secretary of State for Energy Security and Net Zero from August 2023 to July 2024. She has been described as a close ally of former Prime Minister Rishi Sunak and an ardent supporter of Brexit.

After graduating in mathematics and philosophy from Exeter College, Oxford, Coutinho worked as an associate at the investment bank Merrill Lynch for nearly four years, and co-founded, with food writer Mina Holland, a literary-themed events company called The Novel Diner. She also worked at the centre-right think tank Centre for Social Justice, at the industry group Housing and Finance Institute created by Natalie Elphicke, and for accounting firm KPMG as a corporate responsibility manager. She left KPMG to become a special adviser at HM Treasury; initially working for Julian Smith, she became an aide to Sunak.

Coutinho joined the frontbench as Parliamentary Under-Secretary of State for Disabled People in September 2022 under Prime Minister Liz Truss. After Truss's resignation the following month, Coutinho endorsed Rishi Sunak's successful leadership bid and subsequently was appointed Parliamentary Under-Secretary of State for Children, Families and Wellbeing in his ministry. She was promoted to the Cabinet as Secretary of State for Energy Security and Net Zero in August 2023. After the defeat of the Conservative Party in the 2024 general election, Coutinho became the Shadow Secretary of State for Energy Security and Net Zero in Sunak's Shadow Cabinet. She was reappointed to the position after the election of Kemi Badenoch as leader in November 2024, and gained the additional position of Shadow Minister for Equalities.

In the 2026 shadow cabinet reshuffle, Coutinho was promoted to Shadow Secretary of State for Business and Trade; Julia Lopez was appointed to cover her while Coutinho is on maternity leave until January 2027.

== Early life and education ==
Claire Coryl Julia Coutinho was born on 8 July 1985 in London. Her parents emigrated from India in the late 1970s and are of Goan Catholic descent. Her late father Winston was an anaesthetist, and her mother Maria is a general practitioner (GP). She has one sister who is also a GP. Coutinho attended James Allen's Girls' School, a private day school in Dulwich on a full scholarship. After this, she completed a BA in mathematics and philosophy at Exeter College, Oxford between 2004 and 2007.

== Career ==
After graduating, Coutinho worked as an associate at the investment bank Merrill Lynch for nearly four years. In 2012, Coutinho and food writer Mina Holland founded a literary-themed events company called The Novel Diner. Two years later, she appeared on the cooking game show The Taste judged by Anthony Bourdain and Nigella Lawson. The Novel Diner was dissolved in 2015.

Coutinho worked at Iain Duncan Smith's centre-right think tank Centre for Social Justice for two years, in the areas of financial inclusion, education, and regeneration policy. As of 2016, she was a programme director for the industry group Housing and Finance Institute created by Natalie Elphicke. She also worked for accounting firm KPMG as a corporate responsibility manager.

Coutinho left the company to become a special adviser at HM Treasury. Initially working for Julian Smith, she then became an aide to Rishi Sunak. Coutinho has commented that she left KPMG to join the government as a special adviser so that she could help deliver Brexit "from the inside", having supported the Leave vote in the 2016 EU membership referendum.

== Parliamentary career ==
Coutinho was selected as the Conservative candidate for East Surrey on 8 November 2019 after the 2019 United Kingdom general election was announced at the end of October. Described in The Guardian as a "super-safe Conservative seat", East Surrey was previously held by Sam Gyimah who defected to the Liberal Democrats in September that year.

She was elected as MP for East Surrey at the 2019 general election, which was held on 12 December, with 59.7% of the vote and a majority of 24,040. This was a similar share of the constituency vote to that which the Conservative Party secured in the previous election in 2017, when Gyimah took 59.6% of votes cast.

In May 2020, she was criticised by several of her local constituents for supporting Dominic Cummings, then the chief adviser to Prime Minister Boris Johnson, in taking a controversial 260-mile (420 km) trip from London to County Durham during a national lockdown in the COVID-19 pandemic. In June 2020, the windows of the East Surrey Conservative Association offices were graffitied with the words "liars, cheats, traitors" in black paint.

Coutinho joined the advisory board of the centre-right think tank Onward in February 2020. She was appointed as a Parliamentary Private Secretary (PPS) to Rishi Sunak in March 2020, She was a senior fellow at the conservative think tank Policy Exchange in 2021. Coutinho resigned from her position as PPS on 6 July 2022 in protest at Prime Minister Johnson's leadership following the Chris Pincher scandal, and endorsed Sunak in the following Conservative Party leadership election.

Coutinho served as Parliamentary Under Secretary of State for Disabled People between September and October 2022 and Parliamentary Under-Secretary of State for Children, Families and Wellbeing between October 2022 and August 2023. The government signed a £19.5 million contract with consultancy Newton Europe in June 2022 to design and develop its Delivering Better Value (DBV) programme, which aimed to reduce budget deficits in the education of children with special educational needs and disabilities with a target of at least 20% cut in new education provision. In May 2023, Coutinho stated to the Education Select Committee that there were no targets.

In August 2023, Coutinho wrote to social landlords, housing associations and developers calling on them to let childminders work from rented properties. She commented that restrictive clauses in their contracts may stop them working from their homes.

At the 2024 general election, Coutinho was re-elected to Parliament as MP for East Surrey with a decreased vote share of 35.6% and a decreased majority of 7,450. The Conservative Party lost the election, and on 8 July 2024, she was appointed as Shadow Secretary of State for Energy Security and Net Zero in Sunak's shadow cabinet.

=== Secretary of State for Energy Security and Net Zero ===
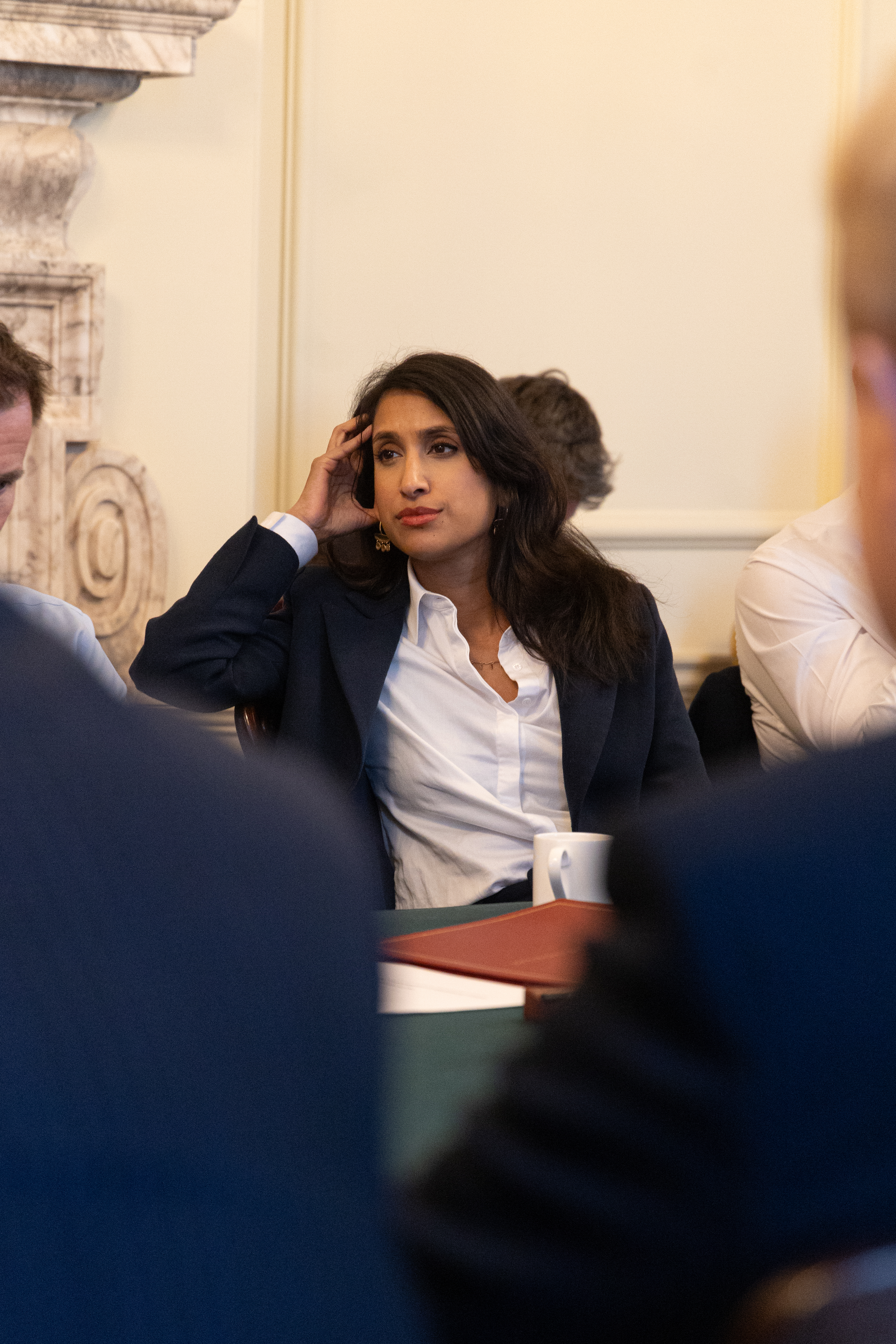
Coutinho at a Cabinet meeting in November 2023

On 31 August 2023, Coutinho was appointed as Secretary of State for Energy Security and Net Zero, replacing Grant Shapps; she was the first of the MPs elected in 2019 to join the Cabinet, and at 38 was the youngest member. In the Daily Telegraph, Daniel Martin and Ben Riley-Smith commented that Coutinho's appointment came at a time when Sunak's government was signalling "a subtle change of policy from the Government away from green causes". They reported that a "senior government source" had stated that both Sunak and Coutinho were committed to planning for net zero, but would be looking to prevent people from facing large financial costs for the implementation of net zero plans. The reporters noted that although she had previously supported both the preservation of green belts and the expansion of wild rural spaces, she had also shown sympathy for owners of oil boilers, and speculated that she might overturn the policies of banning new oil boilers from 2026 and of banning new petrol and diesel cars from 2030. Heather Stewart of The Guardian remarked that while Coutinho appeared to show a genuine interest in environmental issues, as evidenced by her membership of the Conservative Environment Network before becoming a minister, Sunak's position seemed to be to seek to gain votes by backtracking on the party's net zero commitments.

In a speech at the 2023 Conservative Party Conference, Coutinho claimed that the Labour Party supported the introduction of a meat tax. Factchecking charity Full Fact found no evidence of this. When pressed by Sky News journalist Sophy Ridge on her comments, she said that it was only a light-hearted moment in her speech and provided no evidence for her assertion.

In April 2024, Coutinho replied to criticism from Chris Stark, the outgoing Head of the Climate Change Committee that provides independent advice to ministers, that Sunak's government had hampered progress on climate change. Coutinho countered that the UK was the first major economy to reduce its emissions by half since 1990, and that she had made changes to the tax system to encourage investment in the energy sector. She added that the government would be "sensible and pragmatic" in its plans for net zero, and avoid "heap[ing] costs on families".

=== Opposition and Shadow Cabinet ===
In the 2024 general election, despite large Conservative losses across the country, Coutinho retained her seat with a reduced majority of 7,450. In Sunak's Shadow Cabinet she retained her energy brief as the Shadow Secretary of State for Energy Security and Net Zero. Upon Kemi Badenoch's victory in the Conservative leadership contest in November, Coutinho was retained as Shadow Energy Secretary and was given additional responsibilities as the Shadow Minister for Equalities.

In June 2026, she stood in for Conservative Party leader Kemi Badenoch during Prime Minister's Questions while pregnant, the first to do so. In the 2026 shadow cabinet reshuffle, Coutinho was promoted to Shadow Secretary of State for Business and Trade. Julia Lopez was appointed to cover her as the interim shadow business secretary during Coutinho's maternity leave until January 2027.

=== Public image ===
Coutinho has been characterised as an ardent Brexit supporter, and as a factional ally of Sunak. Stewart wrote that "Like Sunak ... Coutinho has spoken with pride about her Indian background." Rachel Cunliffe of New Statesman wrote that descriptions of Coutinho from Conservative Members of Parliament included that she was competent, "work-driven", "level-headed" and "forensic-minded". Discussing Coutinho's reputation amongst her colleagues, Cunliffe remarked that "The common narrative is that Coutinho is a dedicated grafter who got lucky, backed the right person at the right time, and has been rewarded by a troubled prime minister desperately trying to surround himself with people he can trust."

== Personal life ==
Coutinho married Adam Hawksbee, the head of external affairs at retailer Marks & Spencer, in July 2025 at the Chapel of St Mary Undercroft in the Palace of Westminster. They had met while Hawksbee worked as deputy director of the centre-right think tank Onward in 2023. They have one son born in January 2025 at St Thomas' Hospital in London. Coutinho discussed in an interview with The Times in November 2025 that she was admitted to intensive care postpartum due to acute fatty liver of pregnancy. In August 2026, in an interview, she commented that she was seven months pregnant with the couple's second son and had been the first person to represent a political party at Prime Minister's Questions while pregnant in June 2026.

== Honours ==
On 15 September 2023, Coutinho was sworn into the Privy Council, entitling her to the honorific The Right Honourable for life.

== Notes ==
Parliament of the United Kingdom
Preceded by Sam Gyimah	Member of Parliament for East Surrey; 2019–present	Incumbent
Political offices
Preceded by Chloe Smith	Minister of State for Disabled People, Work and Health; 2022–2022	Succeeded by Tom Pursglove
Preceded by Kelly Tolhurst	Parliamentary Under-Secretary of State for Children, Families and Wellbeing; 2022–2023	Succeeded by David Johnston
Preceded by Grant Shapps	Secretary of State for Energy Security and Net Zero; 2023–2024	Succeeded by Ed Miliband
Preceded by Ed Miliband	Shadow Secretary of State for Climate Change and Net Zero; 2024–present	Incumbent
