= 2025 British shadow cabinet reshuffle =

UK shadow cabinet reshuffle

On 22 July 2025, Kemi Badenoch, Leader of the Conservative Party and Leader of the Opposition, carried out a reshuffle of her shadow cabinet. It was the first reshuffle since the leadership election concluded in November 2024.

== Changes ==
Colour key
- Joined the Shadow Cabinet
- Left the Shadow Cabinet

Shadow Minister	Position(s) before reshuffle	Position(s) after reshuffle	Ref.
Edward Argar MP	Shadow Secretary of State for Health and Social Care	Backbench MP – Resigned for health reasons	
Stuart Andrew MP	Shadow Secretary of State for Culture, Media and Sport	Shadow Secretary of State for Health and Social Care	
Julia Lopez MP	Parliamentary private secretary to the leader of the opposition	Shadow Secretary of State for Science, Innovation and Technology	
Kevin Hollinrake MP	Shadow Secretary of State for Housing, Communities and Local Government	Chairman of the Conservative Party	
James Cleverly MP	Backbench MP	Shadow Secretary of State for Housing, Communities and Local Government	
Neil O'Brien MP	Shadow Minister of State for Education	Gained additional role of Shadow Minister for Policy Renewal and Development	
John Glen MP	Backbench MP	Parliamentary private secretary to the leader of the opposition	
Matt Vickers MP	Shadow Minister of State for Illegal Immigration, Crime, Policing and Fire	Deputy Chairman of the Conservative Party and Shadow Minister of State for Illegal Immigration, Crime, Policing and Fire	
Richard Holden MP	Shadow Paymaster General and Senior Opposition Whip	Shadow Secretary of State for Transport	
Nigel Huddleston MP	Co-Chairman of the Conservative Party	Shadow Secretary of State for Culture, Media and Sport	
Alan Mak MP	Shadow Secretary of State for Science, Innovation and Technology	Backbench MP	
Dominic Johnson, Baron Johnson of Lainston	Co-Chairman of the Conservative Party	Backbench peer	
Gareth Bacon MP	Shadow Secretary of State for Transport	Shadow Minister of State for Housing & Planning	
Alec Shelbrooke MP	Backbench MP	Shadow Parliamentary Under-Secretary of State for Foreign Affairs	
Greg Smith MP	Shadow Parliamentary Under-Secretary of State for Business & Trade and Senior Opposition Whip	Shadow Parliamentary Under-Secretary of state for Energy Security & Net Zero and Shadow Parliamentary Under-Secretary of State for Transport	
Gareth Davies MP	Backbench MP	Shadow Parliamentary Under-Secretary of State for Business & Trade	
Saqib Bhatti MP	Shadow Minister for Culture, Media and Sport	Shadow Minister of State for Education	
John Lamont MP	Backbench MP	Shadow Deputy Leader of the House of Commons	
Mark Garnier MP	Shadow Economic Secretary to the Treasury	Shadow Economic Secretary to the Treasury & Shadow Parliamentary Under-Secretary of State for Work and Pensions	

== Analysis ==
Kemi Badenoch said her shadow cabinet showed the party's "mission of renewal". Her leadership had been under scrutiny and the reshuffle did little to tamp this, as Badenoch had pledged just six months before not to reshuffle her shadow cabinet before the next general election. In the immediate aftermath of the reshuffle Badenoch downplayed potential leadership coup against her.

The return of James Cleverly to the frontbench was noted as the most important appointment with Cleverly shadowing Deputy Prime Minister Angela Rayner. Robert Jenrick was overlooked for promotion alongside newer MPs from the 2024 intake. The changes were considered a political gamble amid low polling for the party and Badenoch's leadership. Many of the most important roles such as shadow chancellor stayed the same however, one major change was the promotion of Henry Newman to chief of staff to Badenoch. Lee Rowley left the role, which was described as significant due to his closeness to Badenoch.

== See also ==
- May 2021 British shadow cabinet reshuffle
- November 2021 British shadow cabinet reshuffle
- 2023 British shadow cabinet reshuffle
