= Homegroup =

Homegroup may refer to:

- Cell group, a church organization
- Windows HomeGroup, a home networking system that was introduced in Windows 7 and removed from Windows 10, version 1803

== See also ==
- Home Group, a British housing association
