= John Glen (politician) =

British politician (born 1974)

The Right Honourable John Glen MP
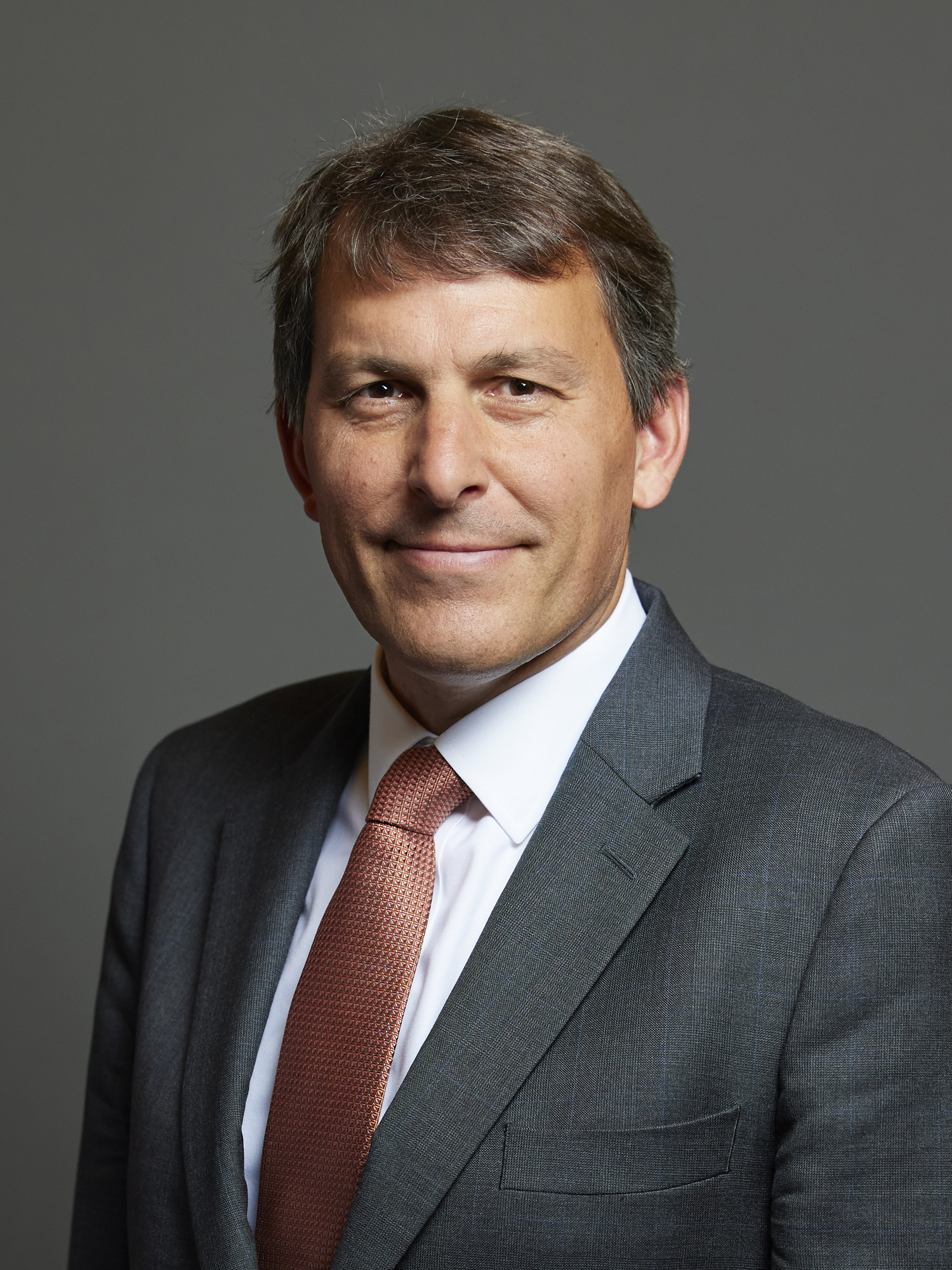
- Official portrait, 2024

Parliamentary Private Secretary to the Leader of the Opposition
- Incumbent
- Assumed office 22 July 2025
- Leader: Kemi Badenoch
- Preceded by: Julia Lopez

Shadow Paymaster General
- In office 8 July 2024 – 8 November 2024
- Leader: Rishi Sunak
- Preceded by: Jonathan Ashworth
- Succeeded by: Richard Holden

Minister for the Cabinet Office Paymaster General
- In office 13 November 2023 – 5 July 2024
- Prime Minister: Rishi Sunak
- Preceded by: Jeremy Quin
- Succeeded by: Nick Thomas-Symonds

Chief Secretary to the Treasury
- In office 25 October 2022 – 13 November 2023
- Prime Minister: Rishi Sunak
- Chancellor: Jeremy Hunt
- Preceded by: Edward Argar
- Succeeded by: Laura Trott
Junior ministerial offices
Economic Secretary to the Treasury
In office 9 January 2018 – 6 July 2022
Prime Minister	Theresa May; Boris Johnson
Preceded by	Steve Barclay
Succeeded by	Richard Fuller
Parliamentary Under-Secretary of State for Arts, Heritage and Tourism
In office 14 June 2017 – 9 January 2018
Prime Minister	Theresa May
Preceded by	Tracey Crouch
Succeeded by	Michael Ellis

Member of Parliament for Salisbury
- Incumbent
- Assumed office 6 May 2010
- Preceded by: Robert Key
- Majority: 3,807 (7.6%)

Personal details
- Born: John Philip Glen; 1 April 1974 (age 52) Bath, Somerset, England
- Party: Conservative
- Education: Mansfield College, Oxford (BA); Fitzwilliam College, Cambridge (MBA); King's College London (MA)
- Website: www.johnglen.org.uk

John Philip Glen (born 1 April 1974) is a British Conservative Party politician, who has been the Member of Parliament (MP) for Salisbury in Wiltshire since 2010. He has served as Parliamentary Private Secretary to the Leader of the Opposition since July 2025.

He served in Rishi Sunak's Cabinet as Chief Secretary to the Treasury from 2022 to 2023, and as Minister for the Cabinet Office and Paymaster General from 2023 to 2024.

== Early life and career ==
John Glen was born in Bath on 1 April 1974, and was brought up in a family horticultural business in rural Wiltshire. He was privately educated at King Edward's School, Bath, where he was head boy, and Mansfield College, Oxford, where he read modern history and was elected president of Mansfield College JCR. He was the first person in his family to go to university.

After graduating from Oxford, Glen helped with the unsuccessful campaign to get the Conservative candidate, Michael Bates, elected in the constituency of Middlesbrough South and East Cleveland at the 1997 general election. Following the election of a Labour government in 1997, he joined the strategy practice of Accenture, a large management consultancy firm. Whilst there he worked on projects for Glaxo Wellcome, BP and the Post Office.

In 2000, Glen went to work for William Hague, who was then leader of the Conservative Party. In his role as head of the political section of the Conservative Research Department, he helped prepare Hague for Prime Minister's Question Time and briefed the Shadow Cabinet for media appearances.

At the 2001 general election, Glen stood in Plymouth Devonport, coming second with 27.1% of the vote behind the incumbent Labour MP David Jamieson. Following the election, he took an MBA at Fitzwilliam College, Cambridge, and worked in the oil and gas industries in the UK and in the United States.

Early in 2004, he returned to the Conservative Party to work as deputy director of the Conservative Research Department in the run-up to the 2005 general election. He then became director of the department and set up the secretariat for the policy review that was established after David Cameron became party leader. He returned to business in 2006, managing his firm's relationship with the World Economic Forum. He became a magistrate (JP) at Horseferry Road, Westminster in 2006.

== Parliamentary career ==
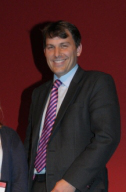
Glen in 2011

Glen was elected as MP for Salisbury at the 2010 general election with 49.2% of the vote and a majority of 5,966.

In December 2010, Glen was criticised for being one of eight MPs claiming public expenses to rent houses or pay for hotel rooms in London, despite already owning homes in the capital that the MPs rented out to provide themselves with additional income. The practice was entirely legal.

Glen was criticised in April 2012 by campaigners for employing an intern from a charity that had recently sponsored an event where a "cure" for homosexuality was discussed. Glen argued that the views expressed at the conference were those of one specific lecturer and were not advocated by the charity more generally.

In the September 2012 reshuffle, he was appointed Parliamentary Private Secretary to Eric Pickles, Secretary of State for Communities and Local Government.

On 31 January 2013, Glen published a paper titled "Completing the Reform, Freeing the Universities" as a member of the Free Enterprise Group of MPs. The paper advocated encouraging universities to build up endowments, which could then replace income from grants; reforms to the tuition fee cap towards "total course costs" instead of per-year caps, and allowing fee differentials by subject group; changes to the way in which research funding is allocated; and administrative savings by the Research Councils and the Office for Fair Access. He wrote an op-ed for the Daily Telegraph about the policies advocated in the paper, titled "Tuition fees cannot be the last reform of university funding".

In June 2013, Glen joined the Delete Blood Cancer register at an event in parliament. Despite the 1 in 1200 chance of being matched with a cancer sufferer, less than a year later he had been matched with a blood cancer patient. In January 2015, Glen donated his blood stem cells at The London Clinic, enabling the patient to be treated.

In 2014, he sat on the Downing Street Policy Board with responsibility for constitutional affairs. In a 2014 survey by a non-campaigning website that enables constituents to contact their MP, Glen was ranked as the second most responsive MP.

At the 2015 general election, Glen was re-elected as MP for Sailsbury with an increased vote share of 55.6% and an increased majority of 20,421. Subsequently, he was made PPS to Business Secretary Sajid Javid.

In December 2015 Glen completed an MA in international security and strategy, with distinction, at King's College London through the Royal College of Defence Studies.

Despite describing himself as a Eurosceptic, Glen was a "reluctant Remainer" prior to the 2016 referendum as he did not feel it was the right time for the UK to leave the European Union.

Following Theresa May's appointment as Prime Minister in July 2016, Glen was made PPS to Chancellor of the Exchequer Philip Hammond.

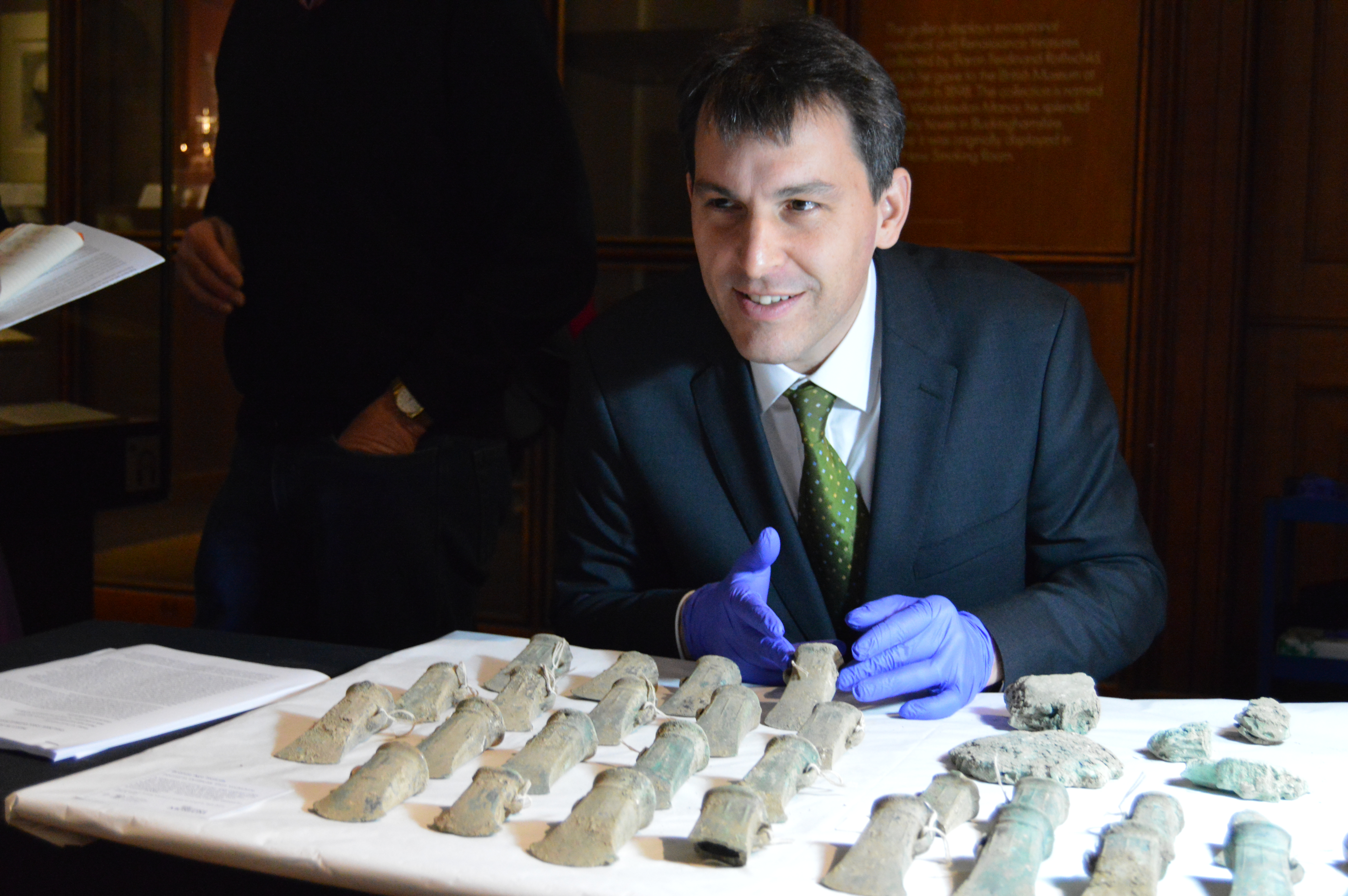
Glen, in 2017, in his role as Parliamentary Under-Secretary of State for Arts, Heritage and Tourism, with the Driffield Hoard

At the snap 2017 general election, Glen was again re-elected, with an increased vote share of 58.1% and a decreased majority of 17,333. After the election, he was appointed Parliamentary Under-Secretary of State for Arts, Heritage and Tourism.

In the House of Commons he has sat on the Work and Pensions Committee, the Defence Committee and the Committees on Arms Export Controls (formerly Quadripartite Committee). He also sits on a number of All-party parliamentary groups (APPGs). He is the chair of the APPG on Global Uncertainties, which exists to inform parliamentarians of the activities of the UK Research Councils in response to global security challenges. He is vice-chair of the Carpet Industry APPG.

Glen played a significant contributory role in the APPG Hunger and Food Poverty's inquiry, Feeding Britain. Additionally, he is secretary for the British Council APPG which took him on a visit to Kabul, and a member of APPG Egypt and APPG Parents and Families. His website lists his further APPG memberships as: Archives and History, British Council (Appointed Secretary in 2011), British-Maldives Parliamentary Group, Complex Needs and Dual Diagnosis, Constitution, Parliament and Citizenship, Historic Churches, Malaysia, Nuclear Energy, Runaway and Missing Children and Adults, Suicide and Self Harm Prevention, and Voice UK.

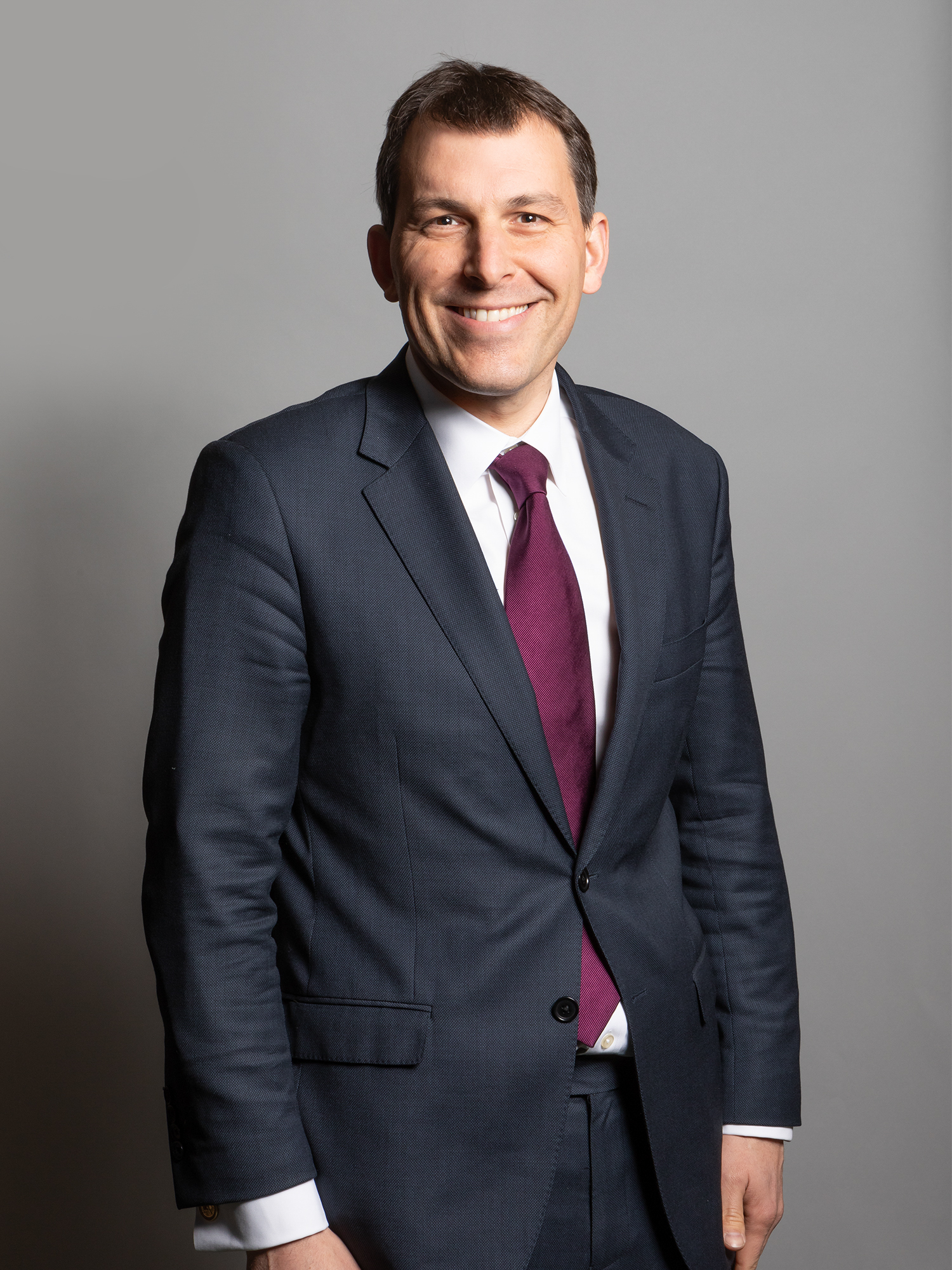
Glen, in his 2019 parliamentary portrait

Glen was again re-elected at the 2019 general election, with a decreased vote share of 56.4% and an increased majority of 19,736.

On 2 September 2021 he became the longest serving Economic Secretary to the Treasury since the creation of the post in 1947.

On 6 July 2022, Glen resigned as Economic Secretary to the Treasury during the July 2022 United Kingdom government crisis.

On 25 October 2022, Glen was appointed as Chief Secretary to the Treasury by Prime Minister Rishi Sunak. He served until 13 November 2023, when Glen moved to the Cabinet Office as Paymaster General in a cabinet reshuffle. In this role, Glen was responsible for delivering the Infected Blood Compensation Scheme, which he highlights as one of his proudest achievements as a Minister.

Soon after he was re-elected for Salisbury at the July 2024 general election, Sunak appointed him as Shadow Paymaster General. When Kemi Badenoch became Conservative Leader in November 2024, Glen moved to the backbenches. In July 2025, he was appointed Parliamentary Private Secretary to the Leader of the Opposition as part of the 2025 British Shadow Cabinet reshuffle.

Since 21 October 2024, Glen has sat on the Treasury Select Committee, and since 17 December 2024 he has been part of the Public Accounts Commission.

Outside of Parliament, Glen is a commissioner for the Financial Inclusion Commission. In February 2026, Open Banking Limited announced the appointment of Glen as a Non Executive Director.

== Political views ==
Tim Montgomerie, editor of ConservativeHome, has described John Glen as a "full spectrum Conservative" – meaning one who is Eurosceptic and supportive of low taxation, but also concerned with social issues and the environment.

=== Social issues ===
Glen took part in the APPG on Hunger and Food Poverty inquiry, and argued in 2014 that prosperity needs to be shared, and that the Department for Work and Pensions should improve benefit payment reliability to prevent the need for foodbank use. Trussell Trust chairman Chris Mould and CEO David McAuley said that Glen "been very supportive of The Trussell Trust and has played an important role as a key member of the APPG Inquiry Panel". He welcomed the rise in the minimum wage and supports employers paying the living wage.

=== Ethics and religion ===
He is an advocate for religious education. On 5 February 2013, he voted against allowing same-sex couples to marry due to his Christian beliefs. This decision was criticised by Nick Holtam, the Bishop of Salisbury at the time. On anti-mitochondrial donation therapy, Glen described himself as "instinctively cautious about technologies that, while noble in intent, could potentially open the door to the development of 'genetically modified babies'". In 2016, he was a trustee and chairman of the Conservative Christian Fellowship, an organisation within the Conservative party.

== Personal life ==
Glen married Emma Glen in 2008.

== Electoral history ==
General election 2024: Salisbury
Party	Candidate	Votes	%	±%
Conservative	John Glen	17,110	34.1	−21.1
Labour	Matt Aldridge	13,303	26.5	+7.8
Liberal Democrats	Victoria Charleston	11,825	23.6	+4.1
Reform	Julian Malins	5,235	10.4	N/A
Green	Barney Norris	2,115	4.2	−0.9
Independent	Arthur Pendragon	458	0.9	−0.5
Climate	Chris Harwood	127	0.3	N/A
Majority		3,807	7.6	−29.1
Turnout		50,173	71.4	−3.7
Registered electors		70,281		
Conservative hold		Swing	−14.5	

Parliament of the United Kingdom
Preceded by Robert Key	Member of Parliament for Salisbury; 2010–present	Incumbent
Political offices
Preceded by Tracey Crouch	Parliamentary Under-Secretary of State for Arts, Heritage and Tourism; 2017–2018	Succeeded by Michael Ellis
Preceded by Steve Barclay	Economic Secretary to the Treasury; 2018–2022	Succeeded by Richard Fuller
Preceded by Edward Argar	Chief Secretary to the Treasury; 2022–2023	Succeeded by Laura Trott
Preceded by Jeremy Quin	Minister for the Cabinet Office; 2023–2024	Succeeded by Nick Thomas-Symonds
Preceded by Jeremy Quin	Paymaster General; 2023–2024	Succeeded by Nick Thomas-Symonds
