= M J Gleeson =

British listed housebuilder

- Type: Public
- Traded as: LSE: GLE
- Industry: Construction
- Founded: 1903
- Headquarters: Sheffield, South Yorkshire
- Key people: Fiona Goldsmith (Chair); Graham Prothero (CEO); Stefan Allanson (CFO)
- Revenue: ▲£410.0 million (2026)
- Operating income: ▼£16.0 million (2026)
- Net income: ▼£(1.9) million (2026)
- Subsidiaries: Gleeson Homes, Gleeson Strategic Land
- Website: mjgleesonplc.com

M J Gleeson Group plc is a housebuilding company in the United Kingdom. It is listed on the London Stock Exchange and comprises a pair of distinct businesses: Gleeson Homes and Gleeson Strategic Land.

The company was established in 1903 by Michael Joseph Gleeson who operated as a contractor and a developer in Sheffield. It developed its civil engineering capability during the Second World War via the construction of aerodromes to support Britain's war effort. By 1960, the firm was oriented towards civil engineering projects, such as power stations, sewage works and sea defense. Gleeson's presence in the private housing sector expanded during the 1990s via multiple acquisitions; the firm also entered the rail sector during 2000.

Following a loss in 2005, the firm was heavily restructured, which included the divestment of its civil engineering division and various non-core activities to focus on urban regeneration, residential property management, and land. Gleeson's homebuilding activities were marketed towards first-time buyers and downsizing older buyers; its homes were more affordable due to a high level of standardisation and a deliberate focus on producing lower cost housing. It benefitted considerably from the British government's Help to Buy scheme, recording a steep increase in both profits and revenue two years following its introduction.

== History ==
The business was founded by Michael Joseph Gleeson, the official date given by the company being 1903. Having travelled from Cloonmore, County Galway a small hamlet in the West of Ireland, to Sheffield to find work as a bricklayer. There he joined an Irish family business specialising in housing development and building contracting. A few years later, he married his employer's eldest daughter. In due course, he inherited his father-in-law's firm and changed its name to M J Gleeson in 1915.

Michael Gleeson operated as a contractor and a developer in the Sheffield area, and owned cinemas and a racetrack. The firm began taking contracts in southeast England in 1930 and in 1932 Michael sent his nephew John Patrick 'Jack' Gleeson to manage the embryonic housing developments. Gleeson began with building an estate of some 750 houses in Cheam, followed by smaller estates in Ewell and Sutton, all at the time in Surrey.

During the Second World War, Gleeson was heavily engaged in the construction of aerodromes for military use; this work developed the firm's civil engineering capability that it would put to good use in the conflict's aftermath. During 1955, the company relaunched its housing and property development activities. Following Gleeson's flotation in 1960, increasing attention was paid to its civil engineering contracts. Such contracts included power stations, sewage works and sea defenses.

Like his uncle before him, Jack had no sons and brought in his nephew to succeed him; Dermot Gleeson had been working in the political arena and first joined the Board as a non executive director in 1973; he joined the company full time in 1979, became deputy managing director in 1981 and chief executive in 1988.

During the early 1990s recession, the firm decided to increase its commitment to the private housing sector. Colroy, a smaller rival company was acquired in 1991; three years later, Gleeson also purchased the residential business of the Portman Building Society. In early 2000, Gleeson purchased the specialist rail contractor Mabey Construction; this move launched the firm into Britain's recently privatised rail sector. Later that same year, the firm recorded a pre-tax profit of £16.1 million (£13.4 million), up 20 per cent, while turnover rose 17 per cent to £349 million; the company's order books were also claimed to be running at record levels.

In 2005, Gleeson recorded a loss of £18 million, which was primarily attributed to the firm's building division, which was soon after divested via a management buyout. A strategic review was conducted during 2006; the civil engineering business was sold (to Black & Veatch) as was other peripheral businesses and the investment properties; in place of traditional speculative housing, the company reoriented towards urban regeneration. By the end of the year, the group was concentrating on urban regeneration, residential property management and land trading. However, substantial losses were again incurred during both 2008 and 2009; costs were cut and the geographical focus was narrowed to the north of England. In early 2010, Gleeson returned to profitable operations.

During the 2010s and 2020s, Gleeson Homes' primary customer base became first-time buyers as well as those buyers who could not afford the more expensive homes sold by rival firms like Bellway or Persimmon, and older buyers that were seeking to downsize. The majority of larger housebuilders in the UK have shown little interest in this sector, and thus Gleeson has not encountered much competitive pressure in this sector. Furthermore, to achieve better volume discounts and more efficient construction, the firm has also applied a high degree of standardisation and a micro-managed cost engineering model across its various projects.

Gleeson benefitted considerably from the British government's Help to Buy scheme (introduced during 2013) alongside its own shared equity offerings. According to Jolyon Harrison, CEO of Gleeson at this time, the firm intentionally sought out to purchase land that required remediation, such as former industrial sites, due to its lower acquisition cost. Furthermore, Gleeson Strategic Land division has focused on selling land to other housebuilders from a combination of its own assets (including sites held under option) and land being promoted for planning on behalf of a third party. In late 2015, it recorded a 52 percent increase in turnover for the final six months of that year along with a roughly 25 per cent year-on-year rise in the number of homes sold while operating profits almost trebled from £4 million to £11.3 million.

During 2019, Harrison parted ways with the firm amid disagreements over executive pay; he was replaced by James Thomson, former CEO of Keepmoat Homes, was appointed chief executive officer on an interim basis in June 2019. In April 2022, Thomson announced his intention to stand down on 31 December 2022, with Vistry Group's chief operating officer Graham Prothero (formerly CEO at Galliford Try) nominated as his successor.

During June 2020, amid the economic consequences of the COVID-19 pandemic in the United Kingdom, Gleeson forecast a 45% fall in revenue for the financial year to 30 June 2020. In early 2023, following a sharp drop in pre-tax profit, the housebuilding arm of the firm was reorganised, which included the merger of several regional offices and a five per cent reduction in headcount from around 800 employees to achieve an annual saving of £4 million after a one-off cost of £2 million. Later that year, the company experienced a decline in both home sales and margins, which it attributed to the UK's weak housing market. By 2024, Gleeson was recording annual sales of 1,800 homes and had a stated target of eventually selling 3,000 homes annually.

In 2026, Gleeson warned of a potential short-term slowdown in the UK housing market ahead the launch of the government's Your First Home scheme in April 2027.

== Operations ==
The company has two divisions:

- Gleeson Regeneration and Homes equally trading as Gleeson Homes (brownfield land in the Midlands and North of England). Gleeson Homes has three divisions, Yorkshire and Midlands, North Eastern and North West with eight area offices in the Midlands, South Yorkshire, East Yorkshire, Tees Valley, Tyne & Wear, Cumbria, Merseyside and Greater Manchester with a head office in Sheffield.
- Gleeson Strategic Land (options over land in the South of England)

== Controversy ==
In May 2018, Gleeson Homes was called out in the House of Commons by MP Justin Madders for allegedly applying "opaque charges that are not always apparent to the home owner at the time of purchase". The company's CEO, Jolyon Harrison, publicly disputed this criticism and sought an apology.

== Major projects ==
- The Crystal Palace National Sports Centre in London, completed in 1964.
- The Crucible Theatre in Sheffield, completed in 1971.
- Hounslow Civic Centre, completed in 1975.
