= Mike Tapp =

British politician (born 1984 or 1985)

Mike Tapp MP
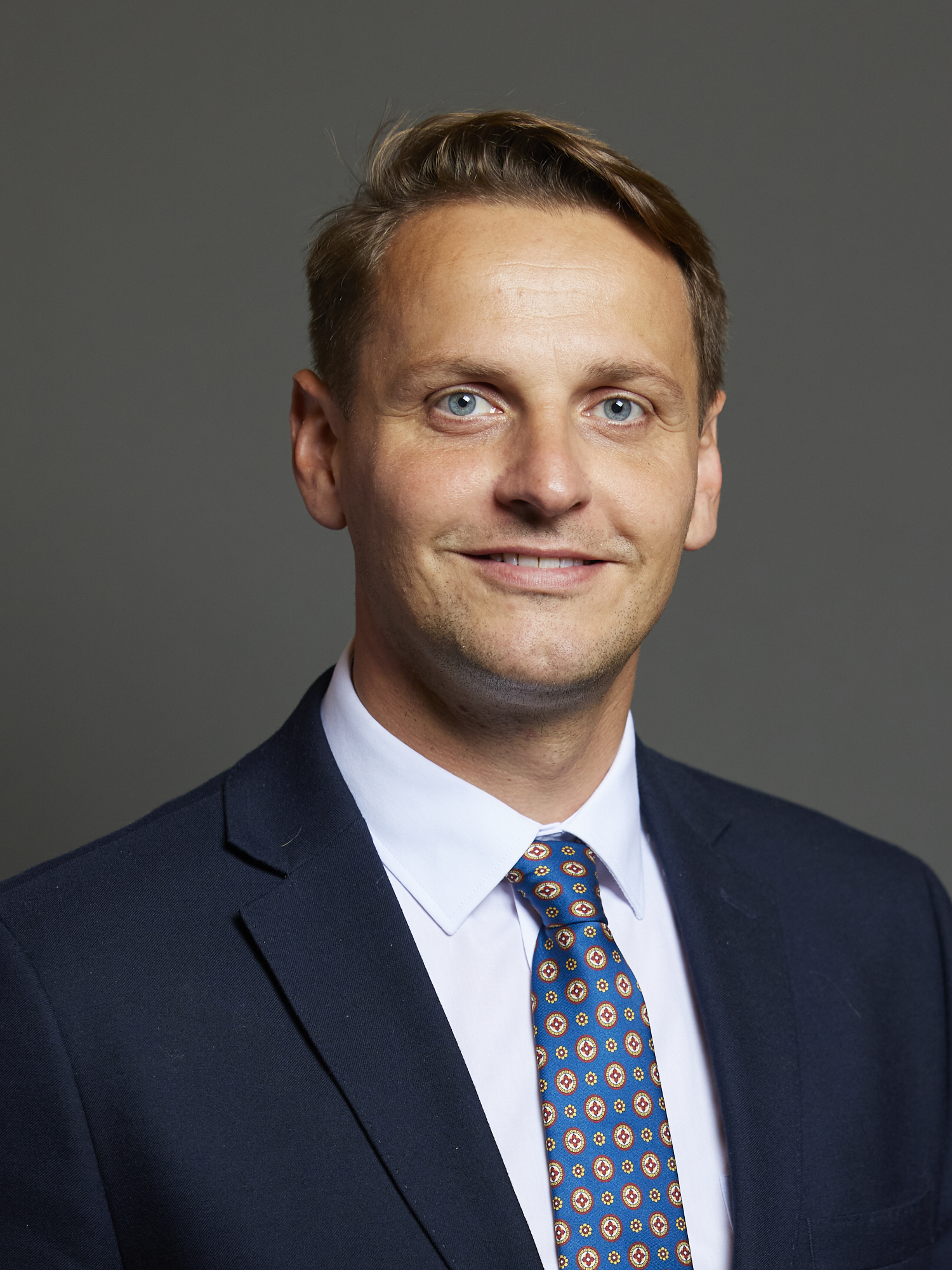
- Official portrait, 2024

Parliamentary Under-Secretary of State for Migration and Citizenship
- In office 6 September 2025 – 22 July 2026
- Prime Minister: Keir Starmer
- Preceded by: Seema Malhotra
- Succeeded by: Jo White

Member of Parliament for Dover and Deal
- Incumbent
- Assumed office 4 July 2024
- Preceded by: Natalie Elphicke
- Majority: 7,585 (15.9%)

Personal details
- Born: Michael Adrian Tapp; 1984 or 1985 (age 41–42)
- Party: Labour
- Occupation: Politician
- Website: miketapp.co.uk

Michael Adrian Tapp (born 1984 or 1985) is a British politician and former soldier who served as Parliamentary Under-Secretary of State for Migration and Citizenship from September 2025 to July 2026. A member of the Labour Party, he has been the Member of Parliament (MP) for Dover and Deal since 2024.

== Early life and career ==
He grew up in Hertfordshire; his mother was a care worker and his father was a police officer. He left university early and enlisted in the British Army at the age of 20, serving in the Intelligence Corps as an intelligence analyst and completing three operational tours in Iraq and Afghanistan. He also worked as a window cleaner and barman.

After leaving the army, Tapp worked in an intelligence role at the National Crime Agency, focusing on serious and organised crime, and later in a counter-terrorism role at the Ministry of Defence.

Tapp joined the Labour Party while serving in the army. He left government service in 2020 to pursue a career in politics, and unsuccessfully contested the 2021 Kent County Council election in Tunbridge Wells North and the 2022 Tunbridge Wells Borough Council election in St John's ward. Tapp was selected as Labour's prospective parliamentary candidate for Dover and Deal in 2022.

Before entering Parliament, Tapp worked as a senior parliamentary assistant to John Spellar until 5 July 2024.

== Personal life ==
Tapp is married to business owner Linda, who runs a dog care facility, they also own two dogs of their own. Linda was born in Estonia in 1990, and she came to the UK in 2008. Tapp has described her, as "my rock".

== Parliamentary career ==
At the 2024 general election, Tapp was elected MP for Dover and Deal, winning 18,940 votes and a majority of 7,585. Reform UK candidate Howard Cox came second with 11,355 votes, while Conservative candidate Stephen James came third with 10,370 votes. The predecessor constituency of Dover had been represented by Conservative MP Natalie Elphicke, who defected to Labour shortly before the election was called and did not stand for re-election.

In November 2024, Tapp was appointed an honorary vice-chair of Labour Friends of Israel, having previously joined one of the group's visits to Israel and Palestine while Labour's parliamentary candidate for Dover and Deal. In August 2025, he opposed immediate UK recognition of a Palestinian state, arguing that recognition should be conditional on the release of Israeli hostages, Hamas disarmament and Hamas having no role in the governance of a future Palestinian state. Tapp vocally supported the proscription of Palestine Action under anti-terrorism laws.

Tapp has supported the use of return hubs for failed asylum seekers, while opposing withdrawal from the European Convention on Human Rights and the former Conservative government's Rwanda asylum plan.

=== Ministerial career ===
On 6 September 2025, Tapp was appointed Parliamentary Under-Secretary of State for Migration and Citizenship in the Home Office.

In June 2026, Tapp wrote an article for The Times in which he called for foreign care workers to be exempt from Home Secretary Shabana Mahmood's immigration reforms. A Home Office source reportedly accused Tapp of taking "possible ideas that the home secretary and her team were working on, and briefed them as his own to try to win a job in the new administration." Mahmood asked outgoing Prime Minister Keir Starmer to dismiss Tapp for breaching the ministerial code, however Starmer rejected this request.

Following Starmer's resignation, Tapp was dismissed from his post by Andy Burnham in July 2026 and returned to the backbenches.
