= James Thomson (London politician) =

English politician (born 1966)

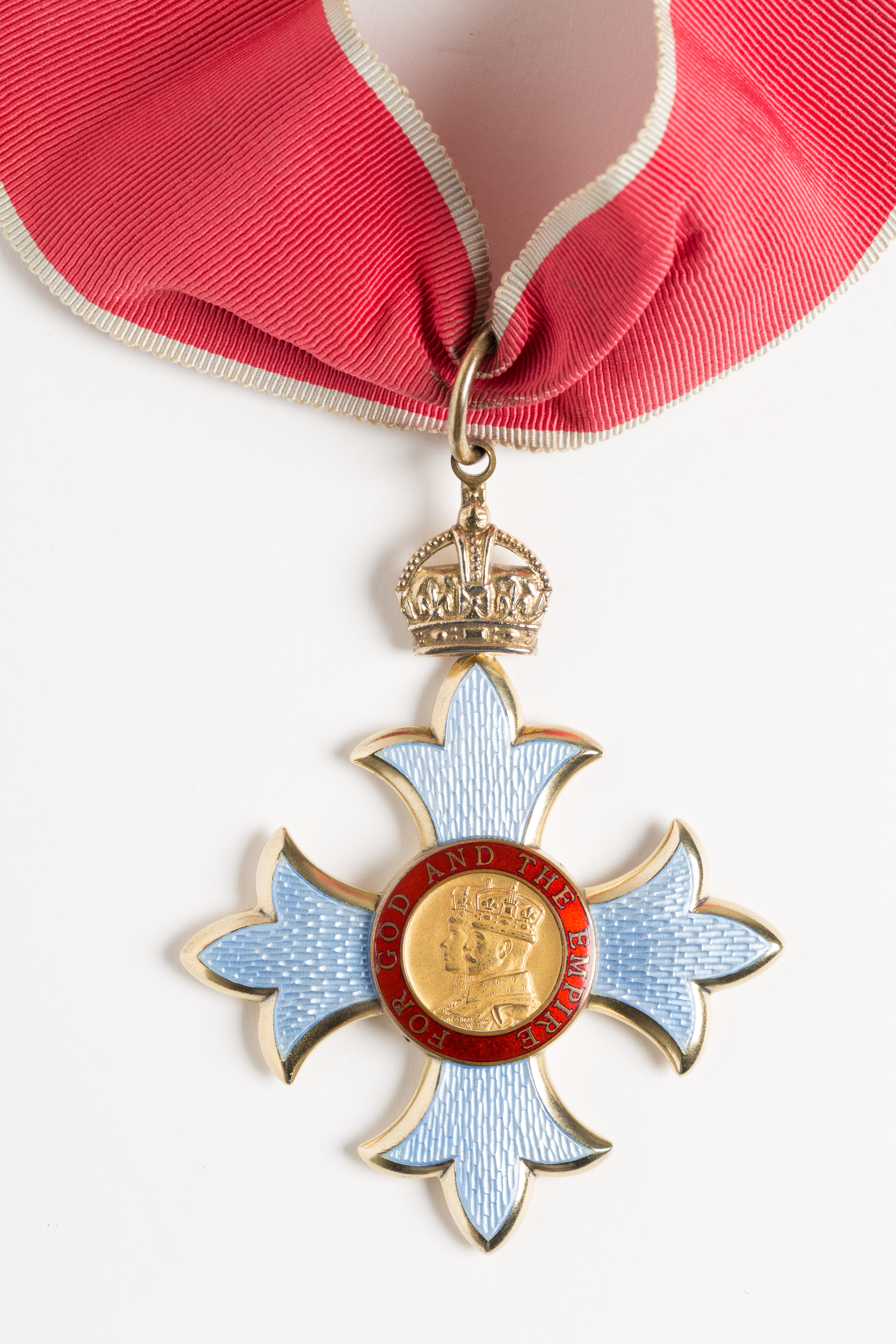
CBE insignia

James Michael Douglas Thomson CBE FCA (born 1966) is a chartered accountant and Common Councilman for Walbrook Ward of the City of London Corporation since 2013. He is non-executive Chairman (since 2022) and former Chief Executive of MJ Gleeson plc, the listed housebuilder of low cost quality homes.

In June 2019, he was appointed interim CEO at MJ Gleeson, and became the permanent CEO in December 2019. In April 2022, Thomson announced his intention to stand down on 31 December 2022, with Vistry Group's chief operating officer Graham Prothero nominated as his successor. Thomson become a non-executive Chairman at MJ Gleeson on 1 January 2023.

Thomson was Chief Executive Officer for Keepmoat and was a non-executive board member of the Housing and Finance Institute. Thomson was appointed chief financial officer of Keepmoat in 2012. Then in January 2015, following the acquisition of Keepmoat by TDR Capital and Sun Capital, he was promoted to the post of deputy CEO, later becoming CEO.

Thomson is a board member of the Serious Fraud Office and chairman of its Audit and Risk Committee.

A graduate of Oriel College, Oxford, and lately Chairman of the City of London Police Authority Board, Thomson was appointed CBE in the 2025 New Year Honours for Policing and Inclusion.

Following the Autumn Statement of Conservative Chancellor Philip Hammond in November 2016, Thomson welcomed the £2.3 billion housing infrastructure fund as he saw it as allowing local authorities to create joint ventures to deliver housing.
