= Charlie Elphicke =

British Conservative politician and convicted sex offender

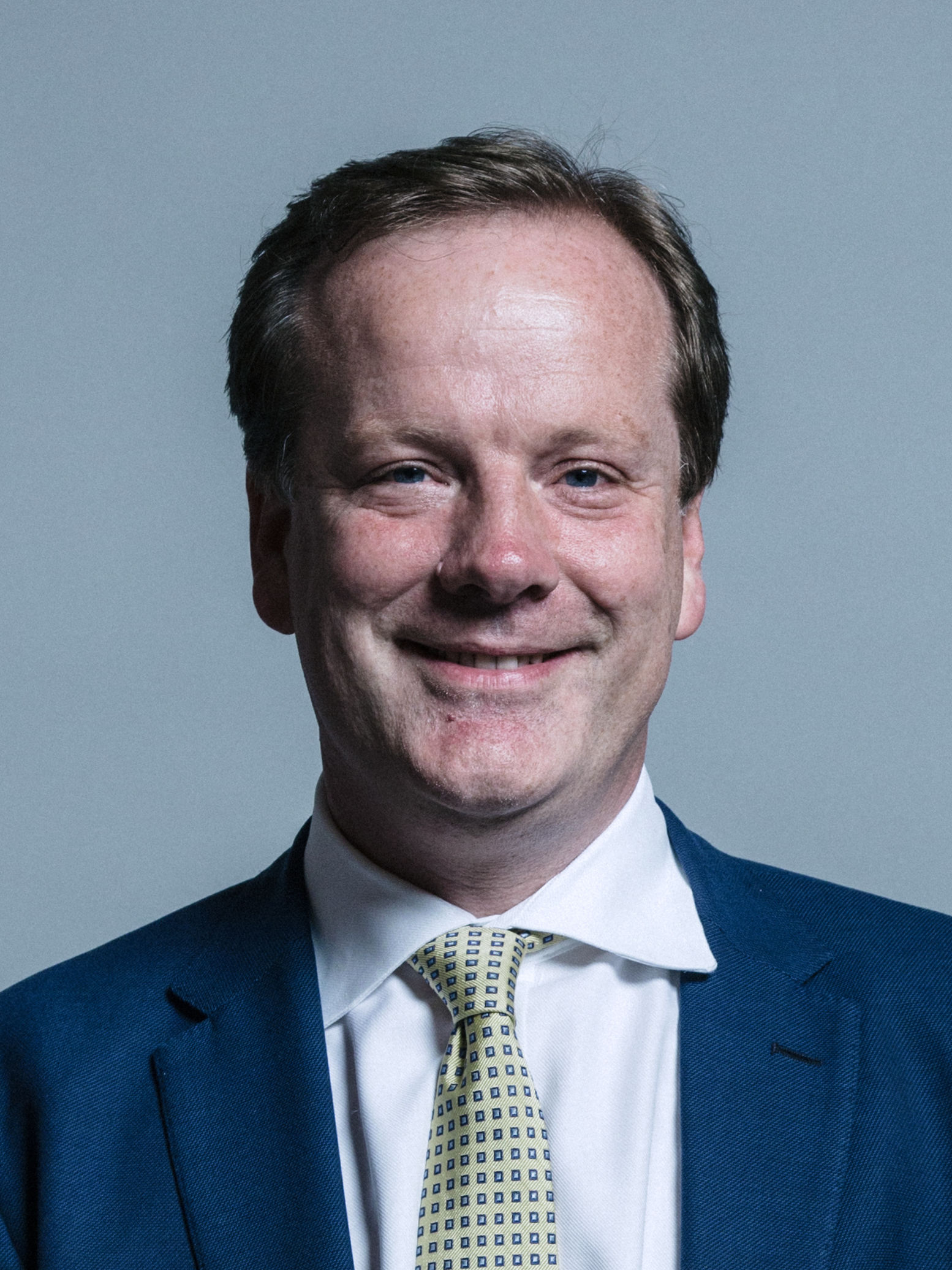
- Official portrait, 2017

Lord Commissioner of the Treasury
- In office 13 May 2015 – 17 July 2016
- Prime Minister: David Cameron
- Preceded by: Mark Lancaster
- Succeeded by: Robert Syms

Member of Parliament for Dover
- In office 6 May 2010 – 6 November 2019
- Preceded by: Gwyn Prosser
- Succeeded by: Natalie Elphicke

Personal details
- Born: Charles Brett Anthony Elphicke; 14 March 1971 (age 55) Huntingdon, Huntingdonshire, England
- Party: Conservative Party (before November 2017; December 2018 – July 2019); Independent (November 2017 – December 2018; July 2019 – present)
- Spouse: Natalie Elphicke (m. 1995; div. 2021)
- Children: 2
- Education: University of Nottingham
- Profession: Former solicitor (2012)
- Website: elphicke.com
- Criminal information
- Status: Released
- Conviction: Sexual assault (3 counts)
- Penalty: 2 years

Details
- Victims: 2
- Date: 2007; 2016
- Imprisoned at: HMP Leyhill

Charles Brett Anthony Elphicke (born 14 March 1971) is a British former politician and a convicted sex offender. As a member of the Conservative Party and later an independent, he served as Member of Parliament (MP) for Dover from 2010 to 2019.

Elphicke studied law at the University of Nottingham before working as a solicitor. He was first elected as Conservative MP for Dover at the 2010 general election and served as a government whip and Lord Commissioner of the Treasury from 2015 to 2016. He did not stand for re-election at the 2019 general election and was succeeded by his then wife, Natalie Elphicke.

Elphicke was suspended from the Conservatives in November 2017 after he was accused of sexual offences against two members of his staff but had the Conservative whip reinstated prior to a December 2018 confidence vote in Theresa May. In July 2019, the whip was withdrawn again after he was charged by the Crown Prosecution Service with three counts of sexual assault against two women. In July 2020, he was found guilty of all three counts, sentenced to two years' imprisonment, and ordered to pay £35,000 within a year towards the costs of the prosecution. He served half of his term and was released in September 2021 from an open prison in Gloucestershire.

== Early life and career ==
Born in Huntingdon, Elphicke was privately educated, firstly at the Felsted School in Essex, and then at Cambridge Centre for Sixth-form Studies (CCSS) before studying law at the University of Nottingham.

Before being elected to Parliament, he was a partner at the law firm Reed Smith (2001–2005) and a tax partner at Hunton & Williams (2006–2010). He also had experience working in the pharmaceutical research industry.

In 2007 he wrote a report for the centre-right think tank the Centre for Policy Studies showing that, while income for an average household rose annually by 4.7% from 1997 to 2001, it only rose by 0.35% in 2006, a slowdown which Elphicke attributed to increased National Insurance contributions in 2003. The report also showed that inequality in income had "barely changed" since 1996–1997, though a Treasury spokesman pointed out that the UK continued "to top global investment league tables".

== Political career ==
=== Councillor ===
Elphicke was elected to Lambeth London Borough Council in 1994, representing Gipsy Hill. His election saw the defeat of the Labour leader of Lambeth Council, Stephen Whaley. He stood down in 1998 and became Chairman of Dulwich & West Norwood Conservative Association. He served in that position until he was selected as the Conservative Parliamentary Candidate for St Albans, in Hertfordshire in 1999. At the 2001 general election Elphicke was not elected, with the incumbent Labour candidate holding the seat with a swing from the Conservatives of 0.7% compared to a swing of 1.7% to the Conservatives nationally, the Liberal Democrat vote falling by 3.1%. He was Deputy Chairman of the Cities of London and Westminster Conservative Association from 2002 to 2006.

=== Parliamentary career ===
Elphicke was selected as the Conservative candidate for Dover in June 2007. Dover was the safest of Labour's seven seats in Kent. At the 2010 general election Elphicke won with a 10.4% swing, the 31st-largest from Labour to Conservative and the seventh-highest figure in the South East excluding the Speaker. He made his maiden speech in a debate on European affairs on 3 June 2010. Upon his election, Elphicke served as a member of the Public Administration Select Committee (which scrutinises the civil service) and the Joint Committee on Consolidation Bills.

During his time on the Public Administration Committee, it called for ministers to accelerate civil service reform. In one investigation, Elphicke looked at Ordnance Survey (OS) expenses for 2007–2010 totalling £8.7 million. Items included a stay at a luxury hotel which cost over £3,000 and a staff reward scheme which cost £32,100. OS said that the expenses involved sales staff.

In November 2010, Elphicke was named the overall winner at the British Computer Society's MP Web Awards which "recognise MPs who have embraced web technologies, and are using them to engage effectively with their constituents". He was a finalist both in the usability and engagement categories.

Elphicke welcomed the announcement of the building of the new Buckland Hospital at Dover, as "it would save long journeys to hospitals in other parts of Kent". Work planned to start in 2009 was delayed because of flood risks, but the go-ahead was given in 2012 and the £24 million hospital was opened in June 2015. Elphicke described it as "a defining moment for the community".

In May 2012 Elphicke stood for the post of Secretary of the 1922 Committee. He was regarded as a "leading light" of the modernising "301 group" of Conservative MPs, named after the number of MPs that would be required to win a majority at the 2015 general election under proposals to cut the number of seats to 600. His defeat was seen as a blow to David Cameron, though 11 out of the other 12 posts went to new MPs and the election removed most of the "historic trouble makers".

In October 2012, the Public Accounts Committee reviewed the Charities Act 2006, which no longer assumed that advancement of religion was beneficial per se, but had to serve a public interest. Following a tribunal ruling on public interest relating to private schools, the Charity Commission had decided that, unlike the druids, the Plymouth Brethren could not show it provided public worship for all as it was "exclusive". Secondly they deemed that its doctrine of separation, which limits the time members spend with outsiders, may harm rather than benefit family life, though they accepted this was based on possibly outdated criticisms, not evidence. They requested a test case to clarify public benefit. The Commission provided witness protection for former members. Elphicke said the commission was "committed to the suppression of religion".

On 15 October 2012, Downing Street announced Elphicke's appointment as Parliamentary Private Secretary (PPS) to Minister for Europe David Lidington. Upon his appointment as PPS, Elphicke stood down from the Public Administration Committee, he voluntarily removed himself from the solicitors roll in 2012. He became PPS to Iain Duncan Smith, Secretary of State for Work and Pensions, in 2014. Elphicke became a Government whip, a Lord Commissioner (Lord of the Treasury), following the 2015 general election, but was sacked in July 2016 when Theresa May replaced Cameron as Prime Minister. After leaving government, Elphicke served on the Public Accounts Committee and Treasury Select Committee respectively.

Elphicke campaigned to remain in the European Union in the 2016 membership referendum. He contributed to the Conservative Government's first defeat over key Brexit legislation in December 2017, when he abstained in the vote on Dominic Grieve's amendment requiring Parliament to have a vote on the final deal relating to the UK departing the European Union. Elphicke argued in the House of Commons that the process of taking back control from the EU should be carried out in a manner that respected the sovereignty of Parliament.

The instigation of additional border security following the 2016 Nice truck attack caused much publicised seven-mile queues, taking up to fourteen hours to process, on the A2 and A20. Elphicke criticised the Department for Transport and the Home Office, who were advised of but unprepared for delays.

In August 2016, Elphicke called for light naval forces including the Royal Marines to prevent cross-channel people-trafficking. He compared the requirements with those of the First World War Dover Patrol, which used older ships to detect and deter enemy submarines from using the Channel.

In August 2017 Elphicke organised a letter to be sent by 40 MPs to the Chancellor of the Exchequer, Philip Hammond, calling for the return of duty-free sales once the UK leaves the EU. He became vice-chair of the All Party Parliamentary Group FairFuelUK – an organisation committed to reducing fuel duty – having previously served as its chairman.

In March 2019 Elphicke was one of 21 MPs who voted against LGBT inclusive sex and relationship education in English schools.

=== Campaigns ===
==== Local campaigns ====
Elphicke campaigned against the privatisation of the Port of Dover prior to and since his election; he created an alternative proposal, which was put to the residents of Dover in a local referendum in March 2011, who voted by an overwhelming majority in favour of a "people's port" rather than privatisation – 5,244 votes in favour compared to 113 against. He became one of the 8 directors of the People's Port Community Trust who led the campaign to buy the port of Dover for the community. The People's Port campaign also interested the Labour Party's then head of Policy, Jon Cruddas MP, who appeared to see it as a mutual ownership model for national assets that could be adopted by the party. For the Conservatives, Elphicke's proposal was seen as a key test of the David Cameron's Big Society policy. Other Conservatives see Elphicke's proposal as a method of populist privatisation. The campaign also had the enthusiastic support of the Blue Labour founder Lord Glasman, who saw it as "a story about Labour helping workers and exports ... It's everything Blue Labour stands for."

On 9 April 2014 the Shipping and Ports Minister, Stephen Hammond MP, visited Dover and paid tribute to Elphicke and the Harbour Board chair, George Jenkins, for progress made "in bridging the divide between port and town". He set out the board structure and steps needed to ensure an enduring solution in the key areas of community involvement, commercial development and regeneration. The trust would be given 'up to date' powers to raise funds for investment. Elphicke said the People's Port Trust priorities were "partnership with the board, a voice for the community in the boardroom, and improvements for Dover with a community fund from the port".

==== Robert's Law ====
Following the death of Robert Fraser, a teenager from Deal, after taking the opioid fentanyl on 19 November 2016, Elphicke and Fraser's mother, Michelle Parry, began a campaign for tougher Fentanyl laws. Fentanyl, branded a 'one-touch death drug', is a prescribed painkiller drug that is 50 times stronger than heroin and 100 times stronger than morphine. Following the campaign, in February 2018, the Sentencing Council said that a review would begin soon for tougher punishments for cases involving the drug Fentanyl. Two months later the Director of Public Prosecutions wrote to Elphicke confirming that the Crown Prosecution Service's official drug offences guidance had been revised to include Fentanyl for the first time.

The first change has been that the Crown Prosecution Service has now specified for prosecutors that, in dealing with cases of fentanyl, they need to take into account the potency of this drug. They are encouraged to bring expert witnesses into the court room in order to explain how this drug operates, and how a tiny quantity of it can have the potency of heroin or cocaine in a larger quantity. The second change is that, if the quantity of the drug would cause as much harm as 5 kg (11 lb) of heroin, the offence will be in the most serious category.

During a debate called by Elphicke in Parliament, Justice Minister Rory Stewart announced Robert's Law, saying: "I really want to pay tribute to the honourable member for Dover and Deal. His leadership and his championing led to two very important changes which I can honestly say would not have happened so rapidly had it not been for his work."

==== UK exiting the European Union ====
Following the UK's vote to leave the European Union, Elphicke decided to publish a series of papers and articles to provide his views on the UK's post-Brexit position. This revolved around a theme of Britain being 'Ready on Day One', which provided suggestions on how the UK should be Brexit-ready on the day it leaves the EU, regardless of the deal it strikes with the bloc. He published 'Ready on Day One' which called for: resilient roads to the Channel Ports, efficient processing of customs controls, a new Entente Cordiale to extend the Le Touquet Treaty to cover customs co-operation and build a new era of deeper co-operation with France, a Brexit Infrastructure Bill and one government at the border to ensure order. Elphicke subsequently wrote 'Tariffs Would Cost Europe Dear', a paper in which he argued that tariffs would be more harmful to the EU than the UK due to the higher level of exports to the UK. Finally he published 'The Withdrawal of the UK from the EU – Analysis of Potential Financial Liabilities', with the assistance of Martin Howe QC, on behalf of the European Research Group. This paper claimed that there was no legal or moral case for the UK to pay a divorce bill to the EU; instead the EU could owe the UK €10 billion for its share of the European Investment Bank.

==== Fathers' rights ====
Elphicke has been a prominent campaigner for fathers' rights, "leading a campaign by Families Need Fathers" and introducing a private members bill "to change family law and make it a legal right for children to know both of their parents". In the Queen's Speech of 10 May 2012, the Government announced that they intended to "legislate this area" and on 13 June 2012 Children's Minister Tim Loughton announced that the law would be changed to guarantee children's access to both parents. Elphicke was shortlisted for the Grassroot Diplomat Initiative Award in 2015 for his work on the Families Need Fathers campaign, and he remains in the directory of the Grassroot Diplomat Who's Who publication.

==== Multinational company tax avoidance campaign ====
Elphicke investigated tax avoidance by American multinational companies and showed (October 2012) that some multinational companies, making billions of pounds of profit in the UK, were paying an effective UK tax rate of only 3 per cent. He followed this by calling on George Osborne, the Chancellor of the Exchequer, to force the companies, which included Google, Coca-Cola and Apple Inc, to have to state the effective rate of tax they paid on their UK revenues, and suggested that government contracts could be withheld from multinationals who do not pay their fair share of UK tax.

During the second reading of the Growth and Infrastructure Bill in the House of Commons on 5 November, Elphicke reiterated the rates of tax paid to HMRC by some US multinationals. Many of the leading companies (including Starbucks, Google and Amazon.com) have been called to give evidence over this issue, most recently raised by Elphicke, in front of the Public Accounts Select Committee in November 2012. At the same time as Elphicke pushed this issue up the domestic UK news agenda, the Chancellor of the Exchequer, George Osborne, raised it at the G20 meeting in Mexico City. In concert with his German opposite number, Finance Minister Wolfgang Schaeuble, Osborne called for action to combat tax avoidance and to force corporations to pay their fair share of tax or face serious consequences.

In a debate on corporate tax avoidance on 7 January 2013, MPs highlighted companies which accept UK government contracts but pay little or no tax. Elphicke singled out the technology companies Oracle, Xerox, Dell, CSC and Symantec which – with a combined turnover of £7 billion – earned almost £0.5 billion from Government contracts and yet paid no corporation tax whatsoever. Overall he said ten technology companies receiving more than £1.8 billion from the taxpayer paid £78 million in taxes on UK earnings of just over £17.5 billion of turnover. This was "unacceptable, unethical and irresponsible".

On 24 May 2013 Elphicke wrote an article for The Daily Telegraph concluding: "Amazon, Google and Starbucks are just the very small tip of a very, very large iceberg. The tax avoidance culture is deeply ingrained. There needs to be radical action to restore tax fairness and a level competitive playing field for British business. Axing tax breaks, simplification, a 10p business tax rate and international tax reform can and would make our tax system fairer and more competitive."

==== Criticisms of charities ====
In June 2014 Elphicke was one of a number of Conservative MPs who criticised Oxfam's Twitter and poster campaign against the government's austerity programme. Oxfam had called for all parties to reduce food poverty in the UK; its posters highlighted a "perfect storm", which included references to zero-hour contracts, unemployment and benefit cuts. Elphicke described the campaign as shamefully political and an abuse of taxpayers' money. He also criticised its directors' pay. Debating the issue in The Observer, Helen Lewis suggested the MPs' objectives were to stop charities criticising the government, whilst The Times said that guidelines had changed in the last decade, and some objectives previously deemed political were now accepted as charitable. The Charity Commission ruled that, although Oxfam's motives were not intentionally political, it could have done more to show its tweets related to its own report on food poverty. In February 2015 following a report by Third Sector magazine that 32 charity bosses received over £200,000 in 2014, Elphicke expressed concern that trust in charities would be undermined and that people would not donate if they thought their pay was excessive.

==== Border security ====
In August 2016, ahead of intergovernmental discussions with the French – possibly involving the Le Touquet Agreement – Elphicke advised ministers to remember that France had genuine concerns about terrorism and that both countries should concentrate on getting a long-term solution to problems rather than "threatening tit for tat". Following a 2017 report citing the £1 billion annual cost of border security delays post-Brexit, and the unfortunate timing of a replacement customs IT system due in March 2019, but designed for the much smaller number of pre-Brexit declarations, Elphicke stated that the border was intended for taxation, not searching, and claimed that clearance at a similar border in Singapore took less than a minute.

== Sexual assault charges and conviction ==
=== Conservative Party membership ===
In November 2017 it was reported that Elphicke had been suspended from the Conservative Party after "serious allegations" made against him were referred to the police. Elphicke stated: "I am not aware of what the alleged claims are and deny any wrongdoing.". His wife, Natalie Elphicke, immediately defended him, asserting that the manner of his suspension was a threat to British values and an injustice.

In March 2018 Elphicke was told that he was accused of sex offences against two members of his staff. He said in response: "I am completely confident I will be able to prove my innocence." In April 2018, The Sunday Times reported that a rape allegation had been made against Elphicke in November 2017, at the height of the Westminster sex scandals, but that the police had not informed him of it for about five months.

After The Sunday Times published its report that Elphicke was under police investigation, he sued in order to shut the story down, using libel and privacy laws. The woman who accused him of raping her in 2015, referred to as 'Jane', said this had prolonged her suffering. Following his conviction in 2020, he withdrew his claims in March 2022, and the newspaper published more detail about the events.

On 12 December 2018 Elphicke had the Conservative whip reinstated prior to a confidence vote in Theresa May.

=== Criminal prosecution and imprisonment ===
On 22 July 2019, the Crown Prosecution Service (CPS) announced they had charged Elphicke with three counts of sexual assault relating to two women: one charge relating to an incident in 2007 and the other two in 2016. He appeared at Westminster Magistrates' Court on 6 September 2019 and denied all three charges. In their statement, the CPS emphasised that Elphicke "has a right to a fair trial" and that "there should be no reporting, commentary or sharing of information online which could in any way prejudice these proceedings". The Conservative Party again withdrew Elphicke's whip later that day. In October 2019 Elphicke appeared at Southwark Crown Court and was granted bail to return for trial on 29 June 2020.

During his trial the court heard how Elphicke groped one of his accusers, chased her around his house, and sang "I'm a naughty Tory, I'm a naughty Tory." On 30 July 2020, Elphicke was found guilty on three counts of sexual assault. On 15 September, he was sentenced to two years in prison. He sought leave to appeal against the sentence, but this was denied in March 2021.

He was released from HMP Leyhill in Gloucestershire on 14 September 2021 after serving half of his sentence. He was summoned back to magistrates court for non-payment of the £35,000 costs order awarded at his original trial; he claimed to be unable to pay, stating that “I have no job, I have no career, I am long-term unemployed,” and that he was living in a rented one bedroom flat and claiming Universal Credit. He was nonetheless ordered to pay £35,000 within a year towards the costs of the prosecution. In April 2022, Sky News reported that Elphicke was struggling to find new employment.

His ex-wife Natalie Elphicke and four other MPs (Sir Roger Gale, Theresa Villiers, Adam Holloway and Bob Stewart) were found to have breached their code of conduct by the Commons Select Committee on Standards for improperly trying to influence a judge, when they had signed a letter on parliamentary notepaper to the Lord Chief Justice pressing Mrs Justice Whipple not to disclose character statements in his trial at Southwark in 2021.

== Later life ==
On 13 April 2026, Elphicke was listed in public documents as a self-employed builder and subject to a Bankruptcy order, trading as, Brett Builders, living in a one bedroom flat in West London.

== Family ==
In 2012, Elphicke was living in London with his wife Natalie (née Ross), two children, and Star, the 2012 Westminster Dog of the Year. Natalie Elphicke was present throughout his sexual assault trial. On the day the verdict was delivered in July 2020, she confirmed on Twitter that their 25-year marriage was over due to his actions. Days later, however, she announced her support for him once again, saying he had been punished for being "charming, wealthy, charismatic and successful – attractive, and attracted, to women" and dismissed the claims of his accusers. In March 2021, after he lost his appeal, she was reported as having ended the marriage, divorcing the same year.

Parliament of the United Kingdom
Preceded by Gwyn Prosser	Member of Parliament for Dover; 2010–2019	Succeeded by Natalie Elphicke
