= Andrew Griffith =

British politician (born 1971)

Andrew Griffith MP
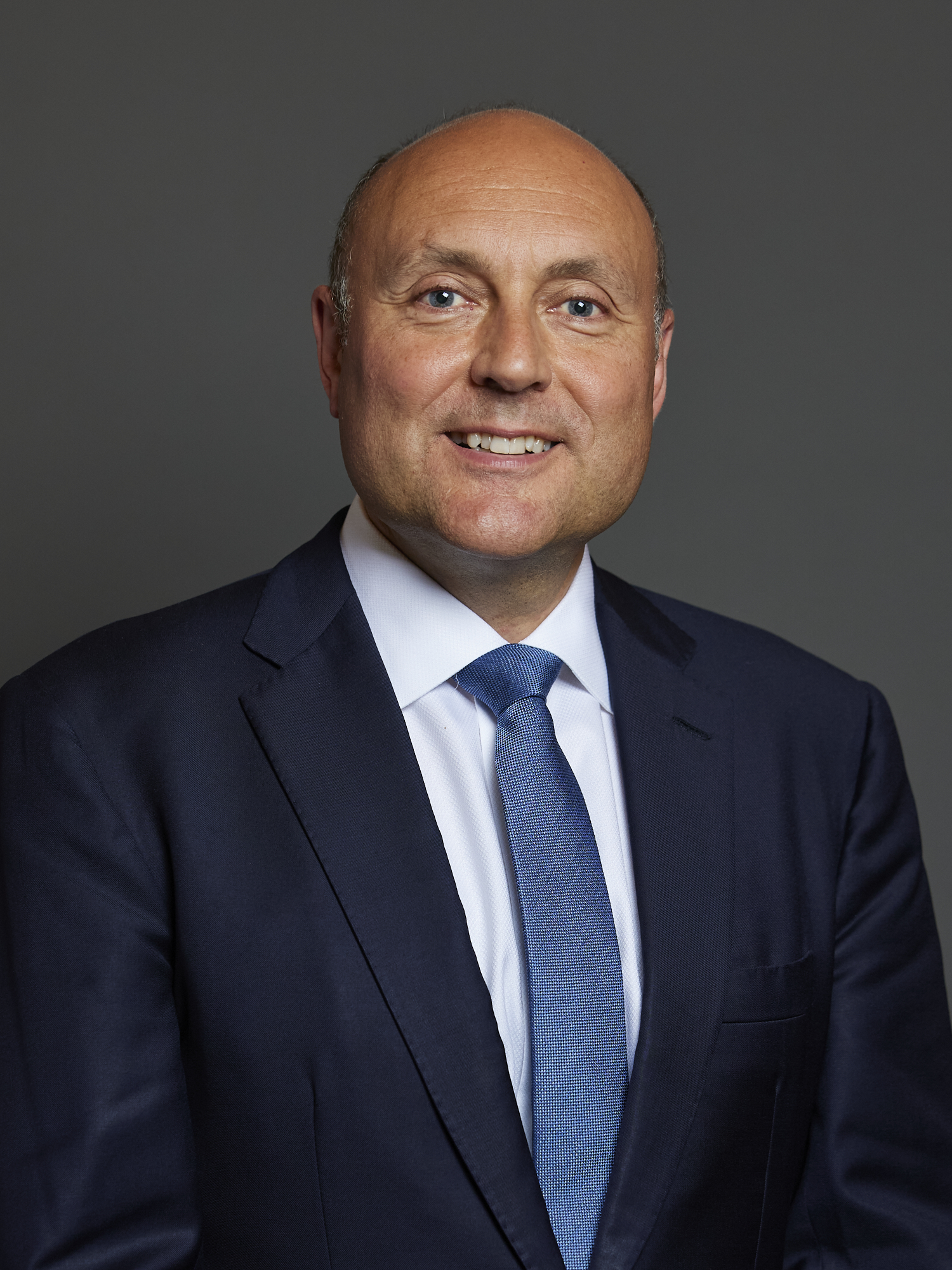
- Official portrait, 2024

Shadow Chancellor of the Exchequer
- Incumbent
- Assumed office 31 August 2026
- Leader: Kemi Badenoch
- Preceded by: Mel Stride
Shadow ministerial offices (2024–2026)
Shadow Secretary of State for Business and Trade
In office 5 November 2024 – 31 August 2026
Leader	Kemi Badenoch
Preceded by	Kevin Hollinrake
Succeeded by	Claire Coutinho
Shadow Secretary of State for Science, Innovation and Technology
In office 8 July 2024 – 5 November 2024
Leader	Rishi Sunak
Preceded by	Peter Kyle
Succeeded by	Alan Mak
Junior ministerial offices
Minister of State for Science, Research and Innovation
In office 13 November 2023 – 5 July 2024
Prime Minister	Rishi Sunak
Preceded by	George Freeman
Succeeded by	The Lord Vallance of Balham
Economic Secretary to the Treasury
In office 27 October 2022 – 13 November 2023
Prime Minister	Rishi Sunak
Preceded by	Richard Fuller
Succeeded by	Bim Afolami
Financial Secretary to the Treasury
In office 7 September 2022 – 27 October 2022
Prime Minister	Liz Truss
Preceded by	Lucy Frazer
Succeeded by	Victoria Atkins
Parliamentary Under-Secretary of State for Exports
In office 8 July 2022 – 7 September 2022
Prime Minister	Boris Johnson
Preceded by	Mike Freer
Succeeded by	Marcus Fysh
Further offices held
Director of the Number 10 Policy Unit Minister for Policy
In office 3 February 2022 – 8 July 2022
Prime Minister	Boris Johnson
Preceded by	Munira Mirza
Succeeded by	Jamie Hope
Parliamentary Private Secretary to the Prime Minister
In office 17 September 2021 – 3 February 2022 Serving with Sarah Dines
Prime Minister	Boris Johnson
Preceded by	Alex Burghart; Trudy Harrison
Succeeded by	Joy Morrissey; Lia Nici; James Duddridge
Prime Minister's Chief Business Adviser
In office 23 July 2019 – 12 December 2019
Prime Minister	Boris Johnson
Preceded by	Position established
Succeeded by	Alex Hickman

Member of Parliament for Arundel and South Downs
- Incumbent
- Assumed office 12 December 2019
- Preceded by: Nick Herbert
- Majority: 12,134 (22.2%)

Personal details
- Born: Andrew John Griffith; 23 February 1971 (age 55) Bexleyheath, London, England
- Party: Conservative
- Spouse: Barbara Griffith (m. 1997)
- Children: 2
- Education: University of Nottingham (LLB)
- Occupation: Politician; financial analyst; chartered accountant
- Website: www.andrewgriffith.uk

Andrew John Griffith (born 23 February 1971) is a British politician and former senior media executive who has served as Shadow Chancellor of the Exchequer since 2026. A member of the Conservative Party, he has been the Member of Parliament (MP) for Arundel and South Downs since 2019.

He was Shadow Secretary of State for Science, Innovation and Technology from July to November 2024, and had previously been Minister of State for Science, Research and Innovation from November 2023. He served as Parliamentary Under-Secretary of State for Exports from July 2022 until September 2022, as Director of the Number 10 Policy Unit from February 2022 to July 2022, and as Economic Secretary to the Treasury from 2022 to 2023. He was Shadow Secretary of State for Business and Trade from November 2024 until August 2026.

Prior to becoming a Member of Parliament, Griffith served as the Chief financial officer and Chief operating officer of Sky, as well as Chairman of Just Eat.

== Early life and education ==
Andrew Griffith was born on 23 February 1971 in Bexleyheath. He grew up in Bromley and attended St Mary & St Joseph's School, a state comprehensive school in Sidcup, with future Shadow Cabinet colleague Gareth Bacon, before studying law at the University of Nottingham from 1989 to 1992. He qualified as a chartered accountant in 1996.

== Business career ==
Griffith first worked for Rothschild & Co and PwC, before joining Sky in 1999 as a financial analyst. By 2008, he rose to become Sky's chief financial officer, joining the board of directors, and at the time of his appointment was the youngest financial director amongst the FTSE 100. In March 2016 he also took on the role of Sky group chief operating officer. During his time in this role, he helped set up a free school in Hounslow named Bolder Academy, with Sky providing funding and exclusive access to its facilities, including coding classes taught by Sky employees.

When Comcast acquired Sky in 2018, Griffith earned about £17m from the sale of shares.

In April 2014, Griffith joined the board of Just Eat as a senior non-executive director, a post which he held in combination with his full-time role at Sky. In 2017, Just Eat was hit by several challenges, losing its non-executive chairman to poor health, its chief executive officer stepping down and the Competition and Markets Authority reviewing Just Eat's acquisition of competitor Hungryhouse. During this period, Griffith took on the role of chairman.

In 2018, Griffith won The Sunday Times' NED Award for FTSE all-share, following his work as senior non-executive director and Chairman at Just Eat.

He is a Fellow of the Royal Television Society and was co-chairman of its 2017 Cambridge convention.

== Political career ==
Griffith stood as the Conservative candidate in Corby at the 2001 general election, coming second with 37.2% of the vote behind the incumbent Labour and Co-operative MP Phil Hope. At the 2005 general election, Griffith again stood in Corby, coming second with 40% of the vote again behind Phil Hope.

Griffith is a former chairman of the advisory board at the Centre for Policy Studies think tank.

Boris Johnson used Griffith's £9.5 million townhouse as his leadership election campaign headquarters. In 2019, Griffith stepped down from his roles at Sky and Just Eat to become Johnson's chief business adviser, based at 10 Downing Street, taking on the role in July 2019.

== Parliamentary career ==
=== In government ===
Griffith was elected as Member of Parliament for Arundel and South Downs at the 2019 general election with 57.9% of the vote and a majority of 22,521 votes. He stood down from his role as the Prime Minister's chief business adviser upon his election to Parliament.

On 10 November 2020, he was appointed as a member of the Public Service Broadcasting Advisory Panel, to provide independent expertise and advice as part of the Government's strategic review of public service broadcasting. A week later, on 17 November 2020, Griffith was appointed by Boris Johnson to be the UK's Net Zero Business Champion, a role designed to support UK businesses to make plans to become net zero by 2050 in the run up to the UN Climate Summit at Glasgow in November 2021.

On 17 September 2021, Griffith was appointed Parliamentary Private Secretary to the Prime Minister Boris Johnson, alongside Sarah Dines, in the second Cabinet reshuffle of the second Johnson ministry.

Griffith is the founder of and, until his appointment as Minister, co-chaired with the Lord Rees of Ludlow, Astronomer Royal, the All-Party Parliamentary Group for Dark Skies.

On 3 February 2022, Griffith became Parliamentary Secretary in the Cabinet Office (Minister for Policy) and Director of the Number 10 Policy Unit, following the resignation of Munira Mirza.

On 6 June 2022, after a vote of no confidence in the leadership of Boris Johnson was called, Griffith announced that he would be supporting the Prime Minister.

Griffith was appointed Parliamentary Under-Secretary of State (Minister for Trade) in the Department for International Trade on 8 July 2022.

On 7 September 2022, he was appointed Financial Secretary to the Treasury by Liz Truss and retained that role until the collapse of her government on 24 October. In this period, he approved Kwasi Kwarteng's mini-budget, which announced large scale tax cuts and increases in public borrowing.

Following the succession of Rishi Sunak as Prime Minister, Griffith was appointed as Economic Secretary to the Treasury on 27 October 2022. In this role, he worked on the Financial Services and Markets Act 2023 and was lead Treasury Minister on the rescue of Silicon Valley Bank UK, the emergency acquisition of Credit Suisse by UBS, and during the 'LDI' crisis.

During Sunak's November 2023 reshuffle, Griffith was promoted to Minister of State for Science, Research and Innovation in the Department for Science, Innovation and Technology.

=== In opposition ===
At the 2024 general election, Griffith was re-elected as MP for Arundel and South Downs with a decreased vote share of 40.2% and a decreased majority of 12,134.

Following the Conservative Party's defeat in the election and the subsequent formation of the Starmer ministry, Griffith was appointed Shadow Secretary of State for Science, Innovation and Technology in Rishi Sunak's caretaker Shadow Cabinet.

Griffith was amongst the first public backers of Kemi Badenoch in the 2024 Conservative Party leadership election.

He was appointed as Shadow Secretary of State for Business and Trade on 5 November 2024.

In January 2025, Griffith attended the launch of a climate denying lobby group, which was also attended by former UK prime minister, Liz Truss and Nigel Farage. Griffith told The Guardian: "In any year, I attend hundreds of external events with business organisations and think tanks, none of which automatically imply my endorsement."

In the 2026 British shadow cabinet reshuffle, Griffith was promoted to Shadow Chancellor of the Exchequer, succeeding Mel Stride.

In September 2026, Griffith voted against the Terminally Ill Adults (End of Life) Bill.

== Personal life ==
Griffith married Barbara, a volunteer charity worker, in 1997; they have a son and daughter. As a businessman, he resided at Putney, in the London Borough of Wandsworth. Griffith also has a residence in his constituency of Arundel and South Downs since 2010. He divides his time between living there and in London.

He has cited Lord Young of Graffham, a long-time mentor of his, as one of his heroes.

== Honours ==
Griffith was admitted as a freeman of the City of London on 3 September 2024 in recognition of his contribution to the UK's financial services sector.

Parliament of the United Kingdom
Preceded by Nick Herbert	Member of Parliament for Arundel and South Downs; 2019–present	Incumbent
Political offices
Preceded by Alex Burghart; Trudy Harrison	Parliamentary Private Secretary to the Prime Minister; 2021–2022; With: Sarah Dines	Succeeded by Joy Morrissey; Lia Nici; James Duddridge
Office established	Minister for Policy; 2022	Vacant
Preceded by Mike Freer	Parliamentary Under-Secretary of State for Exports; 2022	Succeeded by Marcus Fysh
Government offices
Preceded by Munira Mirza	Director of the Number 10 Policy Unit; 2022	Vacant
