= Housing and Finance Institute =

The Housing and Finance Institute (HFI) is an industry group whose stated aim is "to boost the capacity and delivery of housing". The institute is privately funded and works with the private and public sector to build more homes in the United Kingdom.

It was set up by the Cameron–Clegg coalition following a review by Natalie Elphicke and Keith House.

The HFI drew support from Local Partnerships, Pinnacle Group, Keepmoat, Plus Dane and Trowers & Hamlins.

== Funding ==
HFI is funded by the City of London Corporation who agreed to fund the HFI by £40,000 per annum for 2015/16, 2016/17 and 2017/18. Other Founding members are Local Partnerships, Pinnacle Group and Keepmoat. Non-founding members Laing O’Rourke and Home Group.

== Organisation ==
The HFI was established in 2015 with the support of the UK Government, businesses and local authorities. The board of the HFI, was originally chaired by Sir Mark Boleat, a membership drawn from central government, local government and business. The Chief Executive of the Institute is Natalie Elphicke OBE, former independent government adviser and co-author of the Elphicke-House Report on the role of councils in housing supply.

The HFI board consists of

- Natalie Elphicke, Chief Executive
- Mark Boleat, Chairman
- Keith House, Leader of Eastleigh Borough Council
- Bob Kerslake
- James Thomson
- Barbara Spicer
- Judith Armitt
- Judith Mayhew Jonas
- Peregrine Lloyd
- Steve Bullock
- Rob Beiley

== Policies ==
As well as its work with industry stakeholders to increase the rate of housebuilding, the HFI is also a housing think tank. The HFI launched a six-month government backed pilot research programme on infrastructure which brought together key players from private and public sectors. It followed a HFI paper which highlighted how the failure of some water companies was exacerbating the housing crisis. The report set out an eight-point plan to get Britain building infrastructure in the right places and at the right time in order to support the housebuilding industry.

The HFI has looked extensively at the housing crisis in London. The Institute's chairman, Mark Boleat, has called for a radical planning shake-up to solve London's housing crisis that would professionalise decision-making in the planning system, increase the supply of land suitable for house building and allow substantially greater densities of homes in the capital. Following this report, Chancellor Philip Hammond welcomed planning reform in his 2017 Autumn Budget and announced a review to be conducted by Oliver Letwin. At the end of October 2018, the Letwin Review ultimately determined that slow build out was caused by a lack of diversity in new housing and the incentive of housebuilders to restrict supply to avoid reducing prices.

The HFI has also proposed a series of measures to regenerate Britain’s seaside towns, most notably new rent controls.
