= Natalie Elphicke =

British politician and lawyer (born 1970)

Natalie Elphicke OBE
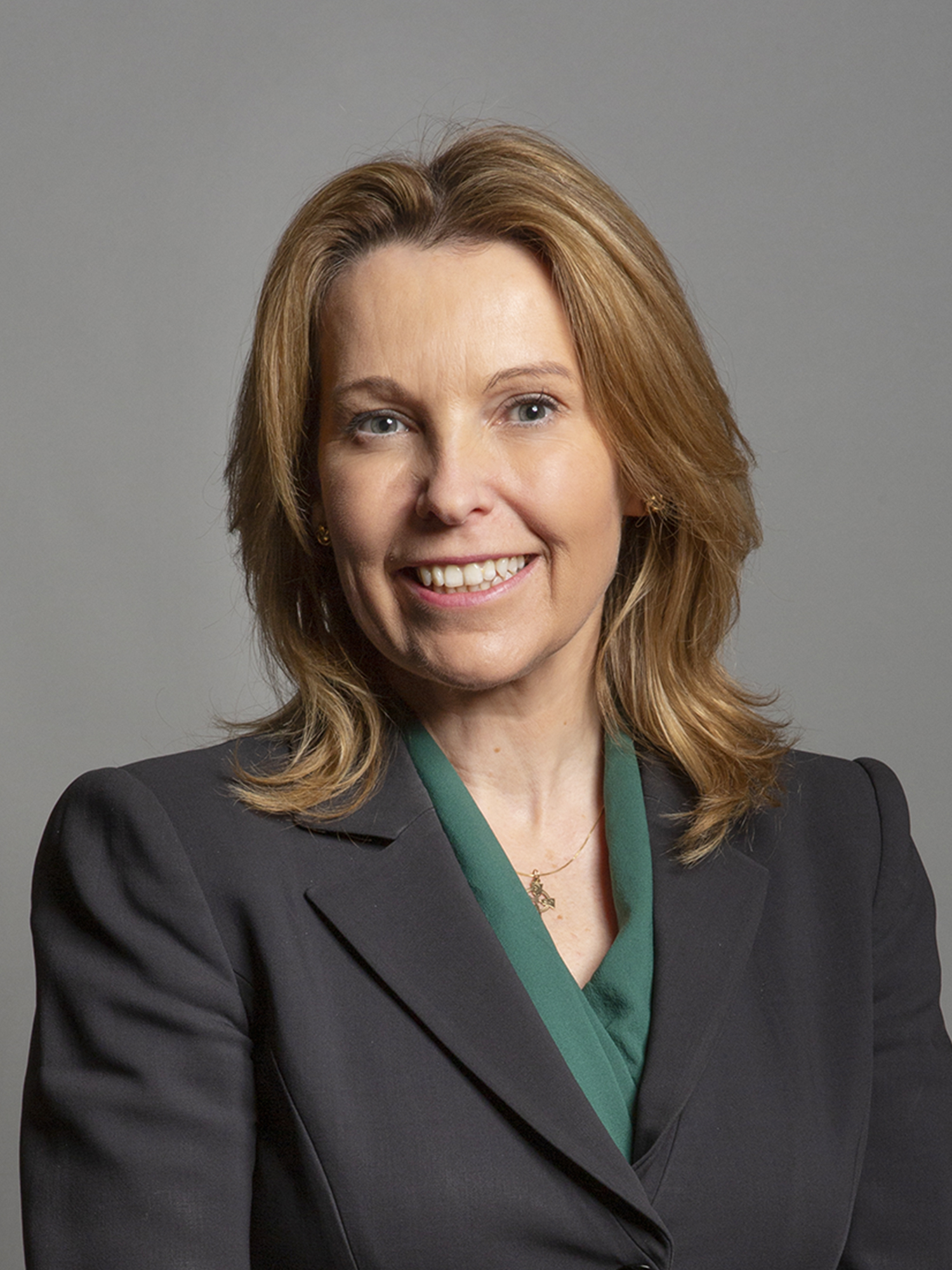
- Official portrait, 2019

Member of Parliament for Dover
- In office 12 December 2019 – 30 May 2024
- Preceded by: Charles Elphicke
- Succeeded by: Michael Tapp

Personal details
- Born: Natalie Cecilia Ross; 5 November 1970 (age 55) Welwyn Garden City, England
- Party: Labour (since 2024)
- Other political affiliations: Conservative (until 2024)
- Spouse: Charlie Elphicke (m. 1995; div. 2021)
- Children: 2
- Education: University of Kent
- Occupation: Politician; finance lawyer

Natalie Cecilia Elphicke (née Ross; born 5 November 1970) is a British former politician and finance lawyer. She was elected as a member of the Conservative Party during the 2019 general election as Member of Parliament (MP) for Dover. She defected to the Labour Party on 8 May 2024, shortly before standing down at the 2024 general election.

Before entering politics, Elphicke worked in housing finance and policy development.

== Early life and career ==
Natalie Cecilia Ross was born in Welwyn Garden City, Hertfordshire, on 5 November 1970, and grew up in social housing. She attended the private school Queenswood School in Hertfordshire, Clarendon House Grammar School in Ramsgate, and the further education college Canterbury College in Kent. Ross then studied law at the University of Kent in Canterbury, gaining an LLB (Hons) degree. She was called to the Bar at Lincoln's Inn in 1994 on a Hardwicke Scholarship, and admitted as a solicitor in 1999. Elphicke (after her marriage in 1995) worked as a lawyer for the Inland Revenue from 1995 to 1997.

Elphicke was the author of the 2010 report Housing People; Financing Housing for the conservative think-tank Policy Exchange. She led the Conservative Policy Forum when it was launched in 2011. Elphicke worked for Stephenson Harwood, becoming a partner in their banking practice. She left in 2013 to found Million Homes, Million Lives, with Calum Mercer, a former finance director at Circle Housing. However, this company was dissolved in 2016. She was a non-executive director of the Student Loans Company, and chair of its Audit and Risk Committee. She was also an independent member of the Audit and Risk Committee at the Department for Education.

=== The Elphicke-House Report ===
Elphicke co-authored with Keith House a review into the role of local authorities in providing housing. Announced in the 2013 Autumn Statement, the remit included the restriction that any proposals should not involve breaching the Housing Revenue Account borrowing cap. It involved canvassing the views of over 400 organisations up and down the country. The review entitled From statutory provider to Housing Delivery Enabler: Review into the local authority role in housing supply was published on 27 January 2015.

=== Housing and Finance Institute ===
Elphicke is the chief executive of the privately funded Housing and Finance Institute set up by the Cameron–Clegg coalition in 2015. In January 2017, she launched a pilot scheme to facilitate a more effective way of integrating the provision of infrastructure such as water, electricity, gas, broadband and roads in proposals to develop housing. Following an initial report due by the end of January, the scheme was due to run until May 2017, with reports being submitted to the MPs Gavin Barwell, Minister of State for Housing and Planning and Stephen Hammond MP, chair of the All Party Parliamentary Group on Infrastructure.

== Parliamentary career ==
=== Conservative Member of Parliament ===
Elphicke was selected as the Conservative candidate for the Dover constituency on 8 November 2019. Hers was the only name on the ballot in the selection vote at the local association. She had previously narrowly lost out to Matt Hancock for selection as the candidate for West Suffolk prior to the 2010 general election. Dover had previously been represented by her then husband Charlie, who had stood down after being charged with three counts of sexual assault against two women. She was elected as the MP for the seat at the 2019 general election with a majority of 12,278. On becoming an MP, she joined the European Research Group of pro-Brexit MPs in the house.

In February 2020, Elphicke was appointed as a Parliamentary Private Secretary at the Ministry of Housing, Communities and Local Government. In May 2020, she became the chair of the New Homes Quality Board, an independent body created by the government to create a framework for improving quality in the house building industry. For this role she earned £21,000 from May to November 2020 and earned £3,000 per month from January 2021 to April 2022 for approximately 8 hrs work per week.

Following England's defeat in the UEFA Euro 2020 Final, Elphicke was criticised for a private message in which she asked if it would be "ungenerous to suggest" that striker Marcus Rashford, campaigner for free school meals, "should have spent more time perfecting his game and less time playing politics". She later apologised for her remarks saying: "I regret messaging privately a rash reaction about Marcus Rashford's missed penalty and apologise to him for any suggestion that he is not fully focused on his football".

In July 2021, she was one of five MPs found to have breached their code of conduct by the Commons Select Committee on Standards for attempting to influence senior judges in November 2020 in her husband's sentencing appeal after his conviction for sexual assault. The committee recommended that Elphicke and two other MPs receive a one-day suspension from parliament. She apologised for her actions.

On 17 March 2022, Elphicke attended a protest against the mass sacking of 800 staff members by P&O ferries in Dover. She was heckled by some protestors who blamed her party for laws that allowed the sackings to take place which she called "nonsense".

She supported Penny Mordaunt in the July–September 2022 Conservative Party leadership election. In 2023, Elphicke was appointed the Chair of the APPG for Blockchain Technology.

=== Defection to Labour ===
On 8 May 2024, Elphicke defected to the Labour Party in reaction to what she described as the "broken promises of Rishi Sunak's tired and chaotic government". She crossed the floor moments before that day's Prime Minister's Questions. She was the third Conservative MP to cross the floor to Labour during that parliament, following Dan Poulter eleven days prior and Christian Wakeford in 2022. Labour announced that they would retain their existing candidate in the Dover and Deal constituency at the 2024 general election and she would therefore stand down her seat. Her defection was regarded as a shock by the BBC political editor Chris Mason due to her right-wing views. The following day, Labour Party chair Anneliese Dodds called Elphicke a "good, natural fit for her party".

Reflecting on the defection, Steve Baker, the Minister of State, Northern Ireland, commented on X: "I have been searching in vain for a Conservative MP who thinks themself to the right of Natalie Elphicke. One just quipped, 'I didn't realise there was any room to her right.'" Left-wing group Momentum said that Elphicke should have "no place in a Labour Party committed to progressive values and working-class people". Rosie Duffield, who until Elphicke's defection was the only Labour MP in Kent, said “Natalie and I work together on a lot of local issues but I don’t believe for a second that she has suddenly transformed into a Labour MP". Conversely, Kevin Mills, the Labour leader of Dover District Council, praised her defection.

The next day, Elphicke publicly apologised for defending her ex-husband and casting doubt on his victims' testimonies after his conviction for sexual assault. In a statement on X, Folkestone and Hythe Labour group described Elphicke as "toxic and divisive" and said that admitting her as Labour MP would cause "tremendous damage" to the party's reputation.

On 12 May 2024, Elphicke was accused of lobbying Robert Buckland, the Secretary of State for Justice, in 2020, over her then-husband's court case. This included allegations that she asked him to move where the case would be heard and to improve her husband's prison conditions after he was sentenced. Buckland declined on both occasions to help. Elphicke denied all the allegations and the Labour Party chose not to investigate the claims.

== Personal life ==
She married Charlie Elphicke in 1995; he is the former Conservative Party MP for Dover. The couple have a son and a daughter. After Charlie's conviction in July 2020 for sexual assault, Natalie announced that they had separated after a 25-year marriage. After he was sentenced in September to two years in jail for the offences, Elphicke spoke out in support of his appeal against the conviction and sentencing, as, although she felt that he had "behaved badly", she thought the sentence was "excessive" and criticised the court as being "on a bit of a mission". After he lost his appeal in March 2021, she was reported as having ended the marriage. In July 2020, she sold the story to The Sun tabloid newspaper for £25,000. The couple were divorced in 2021.

Elphicke was appointed Officer of the Order of the British Empire (OBE) in the 2015 Queen's Birthday Honours for services to housing, in her role as Chair of Million Homes, Million Lives. She is a Freeman of the City of London.

Parliament of the United Kingdom
Preceded by Charlie Elphicke	Member of Parliament for Dover; 2019–2024	Succeeded by Mike Tapp
