= Shadow Secretary of State for Science, Innovation and Technology =

British shadow cabinet portfolio created 2023

- Appointer: Leader of the Opposition
- Inaugural holder: Peter Kyle
- Formation: 4 September 2023
- Final holder: Julia Lopez
- Abolished: 31 August 2026

The Shadow Secretary of State for Science, Innovation and Technology was a member of the Shadow Cabinet of the United Kingdom who shadowed the Secretary of State for Science, Innovation and Technology. The office existed from the 2023 British shadow cabinet reshuffle until the 2026 British shadow cabinet reshuffle.

== Shadow Secretaries ==
=== Shadow Minister for Higher Education and Science ===
Name	Entered office	Left office	Political party	Shadow Cabinet
Richard Crossman	14 February 1963	16 October 1964	Labour	Wilson I

=== Shadow Minister for Technology ===
Name	Entered office	Left office	Political party	Shadow Cabinet
Ernest Marples	16 October 1964	April 1966	Conservative	Douglas-Home
David Price	April 1966	19 June 1970	Conservative	Heath I

=== Shadow Secretary of State for Innovation, Universities and Skills ===
Name	Entered office	Left office	Political party	Shadow Cabinet
David Willetts	2 July 2007	19 January 2009	Conservative	Cameron

=== Shadow Secretary of State for Science, Innovation and Technology ===
Name	Entered office	Left office	Political party	Shadow Cabinet
Peter Kyle	4 September 2023	5 July 2024	Labour	Starmer
Andrew Griffith	8 July 2024	5 November 2024	Conservative	Sunak
Alan Mak	5 November 2024	22 July 2025	Conservative	Badenoch
Julia Lopez	22 July 2025	31 August 2026	Conservative	Badenoch

== See also ==
- Department for Science, Innovation and Technology
- Secretary of State for Science, Innovation and Technology
