= Home Group =

Home Group is a Housing Association in the United Kingdom. They trace their origins to the North Eastern Housing Association founded in 1935. The organisation houses over 120,000 people in 55,000 homes across England, Scotland and Wales.

== Stonham ==
Stonham was the care and support division of Home Group, through which the organisation works with almost 30,000 vulnerable people in 500 supported housing, justice and health services each year. Stonham joined Home Group in 1997 and became a full division in July 2004.

== History ==
Home Group, originally known as North Eastern Housing Association (NEHA), was founded in the North East of England in the 1930s as a response to severe housing problems in the region. The association expanded into Cumberland before the Second World War and for 50 years developed exclusively in Northern regions. Since the late 1980s the association has been building new homes throughout the UK.

In 1974, a new organisation called North Housing Group was set up as a registered arm of NEHA. NEHA became an Industrial and Provident Society in July 1980, and the two organisations joined together to become North Housing Association in October 1980.

In 1995 the organisation became Home Housing Association, coming to be known as Home and finally Home Group in 1998.

In 2015 the Home Group became a member of the Housing and Finance Institute.

== Sustainability ==
Along with four other housing associations – Abri, Anchor Hanover, Hyde and Sanctuary – Home is part of the Greener Futures Partnership (GFP). The GFP collectively owns 300,000 homes and members collaborate to improve energy efficiency and develop decarbonisation solutions.

== Awards ==
In 2013 Home Group was named the Top UK Landlord by 24Housing, in conjunction with the Housing Quality Network.

Home Group's customer service centre won the Contact Centre of the Year award at The North East Contact Centre Awards 2013.
