= Julia Lopez (politician) =

British politician (born 1984)

Julia Lopez MP
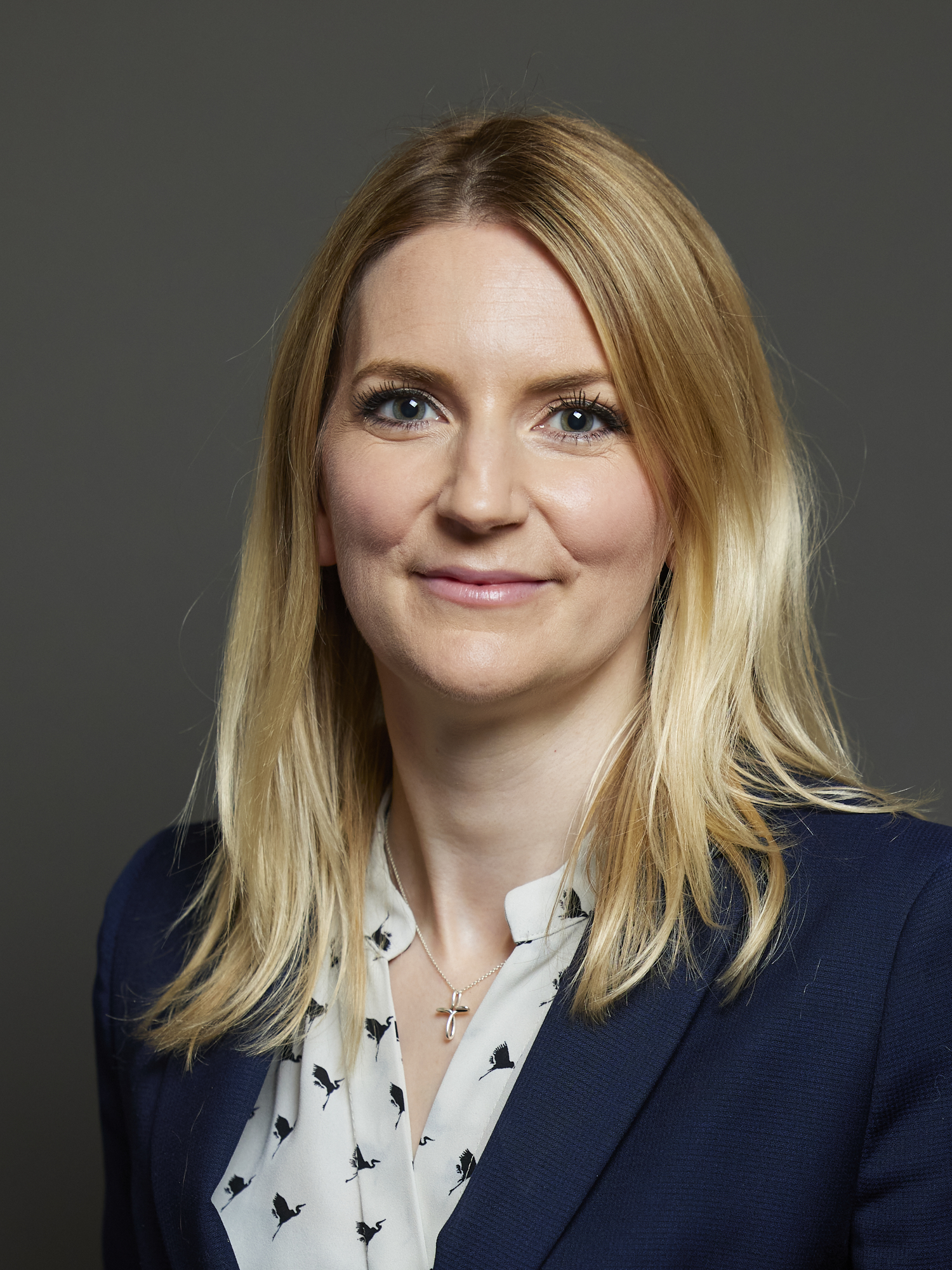
- Official portrait, 2024

Shadow Secretary of State for Business, Innovation, Science and Trade (Note: Lopez is temporarily serving in the position during the maternity leave of Claire Coutinho)
- Interim
- Assumed office 31 August 2026
- Leader: Kemi Badenoch
- Preceded by: Andrew Griffith

Shadow Minister of State for Business, Innovation, Science and Trade
- Incumbent
- Assumed office 31 August 2026
- Leader: Kemi Badenoch
- Preceded by: Harriett Baldwin

Shadow Secretary of State for Science, Innovation and Technology
- In office 22 July 2025 – 31 August 2026
- Leader: Kemi Badenoch
- Preceded by: Alan Mak
- Succeeded by: Position abolished

Parliamentary Private Secretary to the Leader of the Opposition
- In office 5 November 2024 – 22 July 2025
- Leader: Kemi Badenoch
- Preceded by: Jessica Morden
- Succeeded by: John Glen

Shadow Secretary of State for Culture, Media and Sport
- In office 8 July 2024 – 5 November 2024
- Leader: Rishi Sunak
- Preceded by: Thangam Debbonaire
- Succeeded by: Stuart Andrew
Junior ministerial offices
Minister of State for Data and Digital Infrastructure
In office 20 December 2023 – 5 July 2024
Prime Minister	Rishi Sunak
Preceded by	John Whittingdale
Succeeded by	Chris Bryant
In office 7 March 2023 – 9 May 2023
Prime Minister	Rishi Sunak
Preceded by	Office established
Succeeded by	John Whittingdale
Minister of State for Media, Tourism and Creative Industries (Note: Minister of State for Media, Data and Digital Infrastructure from September 2021 to July 2022 and again from September 2022 to February 2023.)
In office 20 December 2023 – 5 July 2024
Prime Minister	Rishi Sunak
Preceded by	John Whittingdale
Succeeded by	Chris Bryant (Creative Industries and Tourism); Stephanie Peacock (Media)
In office 7 September 2022 – 9 May 2023
Prime Minister	Liz Truss; Rishi Sunak
Preceded by	Matt Warman
Succeeded by	John Whittingdale
In office 16 September 2021 – 6 July 2022
Prime Minister	Boris Johnson
Preceded by	John Whittingdale
Succeeded by	Matt Warman
Minister on Leave
In office 9 May 2023 – 20 December 2023 (Note: In accordance with the Ministerial and other Maternity Allowances Act 2021 John Whittingdale temporarily served as Minister of State for Media, Tourism and Creative Industries during the Lopez's maternity leave)
Prime Minister	Rishi Sunak
Interim	John Whittingdale
Parliamentary Secretary for the Cabinet Office
In office 14 February 2020 – 15 September 2021
Prime Minister	Boris Johnson
Preceded by	Jeremy Quin
Succeeded by	Heather Wheeler

Member of Parliament for Hornchurch and Upminster
- Incumbent
- Assumed office 8 June 2017
- Preceded by: Angela Watkinson
- Majority: 1,943 (4.1%)

Personal details
- Born: Julia Louise Dockerill; June 1984 (age 42) Harlow, Essex, England
- Party: Conservative
- Spouse: Lorenzo Lopez (m. 2017)
- Children: 2
- Education: Queens' College, Cambridge (BA)
- Website: julialopez.co.uk

Julia Louise Lopez (née Dockerill; born June 1984) is a British politician who has been the acting Shadow Business Secretary since 2026, standing in for Claire Coutinho who is on maternity leave until the end of 2026. A member of the Conservative Party, she has been the Member of Parliament (MP) for Hornchurch and Upminster since 2017.

Lopez previously served as Shadow Secretary of State for Science, Innovation and Technology from 2025 to 2026. She served as Parliamentary Private Secretary to the Leader of the Opposition from November 2024 to July 2025, having previously served as Shadow Secretary of State for Culture, Media and Sport in Rishi Sunak's Caretaker Shadow Cabinet.

Before entering the House of Commons, she served as a local councillor on the Tower Hamlets London Borough Council, and a parliamentary aide. Lopez previously served as Minister of State for Media, Data and Digital Infrastructure from September 2021 to July 2022, and again from September 2022 to February 2023.

== Early life and education ==
Julia Dockerill was born in June 1984 in Harlow and grew up in Stansted Mountfitchet with her two sisters. Her mother was a primary school teacher and her father was a businessman. After Bentfield Primary School, she attended Hertfordshire and Essex High School in Bishop's Stortford, Hertfordshire, before going to Queens' College, Cambridge, where she studied Social and Political Sciences.

== Career ==
=== Parliamentary aide ===
After university, Dockerill was a researcher in the parliamentary office of Mark Field, Conservative MP for Cities of London and Westminster. She became his chief of staff and co-authored two of his books Between the Crashes and The Best of Times. Dockerill has also worked as his ghostwriter. Whilst Dockerill was Field's parliamentary aide she was photographed in November 2016 carrying confidential notes on a Brexit-related meeting in Downing Street which indicated that the UK would not stay in the single market, and would not seek a transitional deal with the EU.

=== Councillor (2014–2018) ===
In the 2014 local council elections, Dockerill was elected a councillor for St Katharine's and Wapping Ward on Tower Hamlets London Borough Council.

=== Member of Parliament ===
==== In government (2017–2024) ====
At the snap 2017 general election, Dockerill was elected to Parliament as MP for Hornchurch and Upminster with 60.2% of the vote and a majority of 17,723.

She voted against then Prime Minister Theresa May's Brexit withdrawal agreement in early 2019. In the indicative votes on 27 March, she voted against a referendum on a potential withdrawal agreement. In October, Lopez voted for Prime Minister Boris Johnson's Brexit withdrawal agreement.

Lopez was re-elected as MP for Hornchurch and Upminster at the 2019 general election with an increased vote share of 65.8% and an increased majority of 23,308.

A Parliamentary Secretary for the Cabinet Office from February 2020 to September 2021, Lopez was appointed Minister of State for Media and Data in the 2021 British cabinet reshuffle.

On 6 July 2022, Lopez resigned from government, citing Boris Johnson's handling of the Chris Pincher scandal, in a joint statement with fellow Ministers Kemi Badenoch, Neil O'Brien, Lee Rowley and Alex Burghart. She then supported Kemi Badenoch in the July–September 2022 Conservative Party leadership election.

In September 2022, Prime Minister Liz Truss reappointed her to government as a Minister in the Department for Culture, Media and Sport. In October 2022, she was reappointed by Truss' successor as PM Rishi Sunak.

In April 2023, it was announced that Lopez was to take maternity leave from her ministerial posts, under the terms of the Ministerial and other Maternity Allowances Act 2021, to be temporarily replaced by Sir John Whittingdale.

==== In opposition (2024–) ====
At the 2024 general election, Lopez was again re-elected, with a decreased vote share of 32.5% and a decreased majority of 1,943. Lopez was appointed Shadow Secretary of State for Culture, Media & Sport in the Sunak shadow cabinet. Following the 2024 Conservative leadership election, Lopez was appointed Parliamentary private secretary to the Leader of the Opposition Kemi Badenoch.

In July 2025 Lopez was appointed Shadow Secretary of State for Science, Innovation and Technology, and was replaced as Parliamentary Private Secretary to the Leader of the Opposition by John Glen.

In August 2026, Lopez was appointed interim Shadow Secretary of State for Business, standing in for Claire Coutinho who was on maternity leave until the end of 2026. Coutinho was appointed to replace Andrew Griffith on his promotion to Shadow Chancellor.

== Personal life ==
Lopez married El Salvador-born Lorenzo López in September 2017. The couple have two children.

== Notes ==
Parliament of the United Kingdom
Preceded by Angela Watkinson	Member of Parliament for Hornchurch and Upminster; 2017–present	Incumbent
Political offices
Preceded by Jeremy Quin	Parliamentary Secretary for the Cabinet Office; 2020–2021	Succeeded by Heather Wheeler
Preceded by John Whittingdale as Minister of State for Media and Data	Minister of State for Media, Data, and Digital Infrastructure; 2021–2022	Succeeded by Matt Warman
