= Shadow Minister for Women and Equalities =

British opposition frontbench position

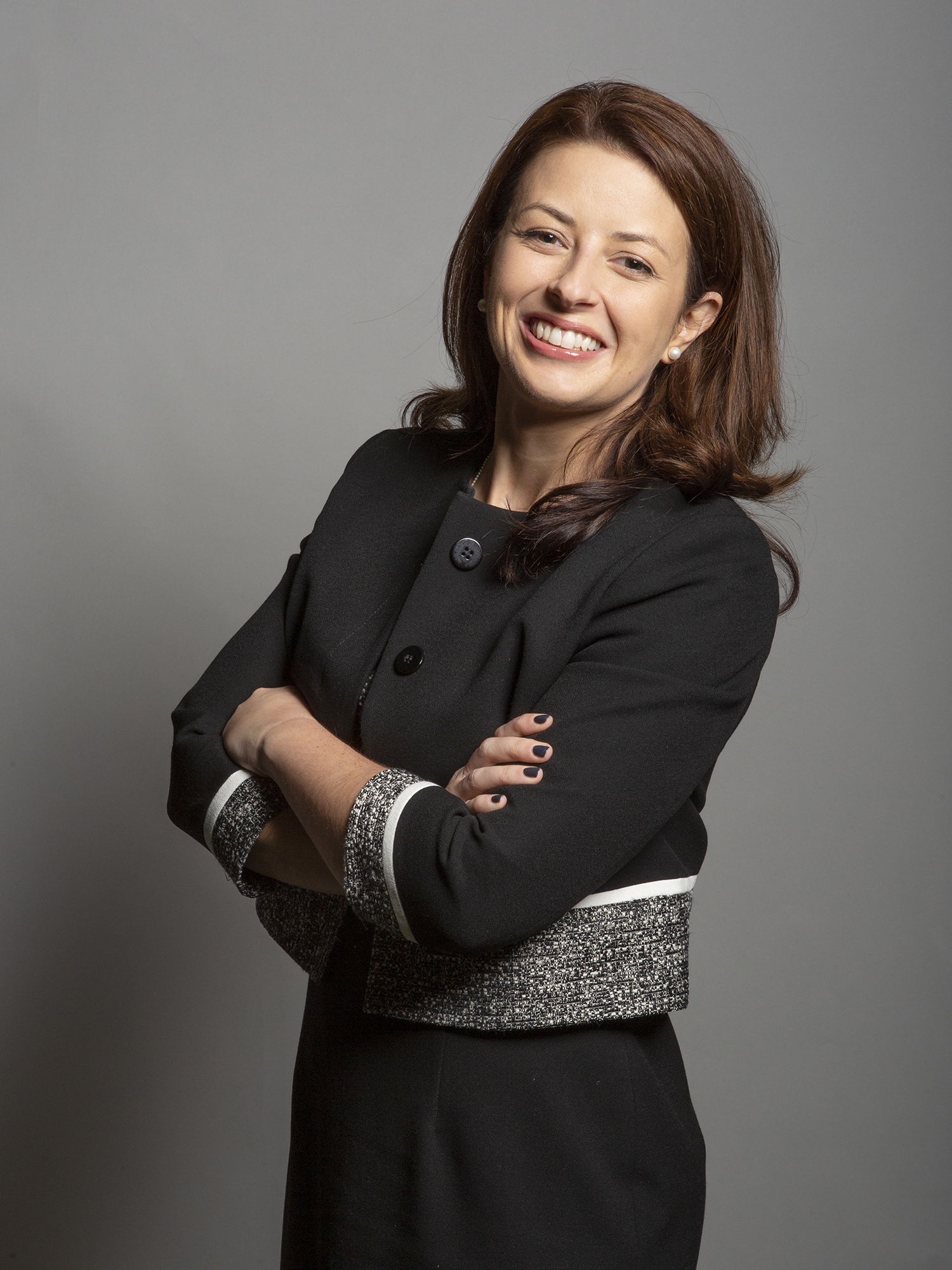
- Incumbent; Joy Morrissey since 31 August 2026
- Shadow Cabinet
- Appointer: Leader of the Opposition
- Formation: 31 October 1983
- First holder: Jo Richardson
- Website: Shadow Cabinet

The shadow minister for women and equalities (previously shadow minister for women, shadow minister for women and equality, shadow secretary of state for women and equalities) is a position in the United Kingdom's Official Opposition, and sits in the Shadow Cabinet. The shadow minister is responsible for holding the minister for women and equalities, responsible for the Government Equalities Office, to account and is responsible for Opposition policy on women's and equality issues.

The post was upgraded to the Shadow Cabinet rank of shadow secretary of state following the snap general election of 2017, with Jeremy Corbyn indicating that if Labour win office at the next election, Women and Equalities will be upgraded to the full status of a government department. Keir Starmer continued this pledge but ultimately continued with a Minister for Women and Equalities when he entered government in July 2024. Previously, the post was often held together with a Shadow Cabinet post, but sometimes as a Shadow Cabinet post in its own right.

The position, since its creation in 1983, has always been held by a female member of parliament. Between November 2024 and August 2026, the position was split into the Shadow Minister for Women and Shadow Minister for Equalities, held by Mims Davies and Claire Coutinho respectively. In August the positions were merged again with Joy Morrissey becoming Shadow Minister for Women and Equalities.

== Shadow ministers ==
Shadow Minister	Took office	Left office	Party	Shadow Cabinet
=== Shadow Minister for Women ===
Jo Richardson	31 October 1983	18 July 1992	Labour	Kinnock
Mo Mowlam	18 July 1992	21 October 1993	Labour	Smith
Clare Short	21 October 1993	19 October 1995	Labour	Smith
Clare Short	21 October 1993	19 October 1995	Labour	Blair
Tessa Jowell	19 October 1995	26 July 1996 (Note: Blair conducted a minor reshuffle of his shadow cabinet on 26 July 1996. As Anderson was in post and Shadow Minister for Women by 21 August 1996 (and Jowell as a Shadow Health minister by 15 September), the change likely occurred at that 26 July reshuffle.)	Labour	Blair
Janet Anderson	26 July 1996	2 May 1997	Labour	Blair
Gillian Shephard also Shadow Secretary of State for Education and Employment	2 May 1997	Unknown	Conservative	Major
Unclear (Note: No sources currently note any individual as holding this role for the Conservatives when Labour entered Government at the 1997 election and created the position of Minister for Women, but no source proves there was not one. Before the Conservatives' defeat, Gillian Shephard, John Major's Education Secretary, spoke on women's issues. She largely delegated the responsibility to a junior minister, Cheryl Gillan. The only parliamentary debate that obviously fell under the portfolio of the Minister for Women during the term of Harriet Harman (May 1997 to July 1998) occurred on 27 February 1998. It was a set-piece debate, meaning the order of speakers was opening minister, opening shadow minister, backbenchers, closing shadow minister, closing minister. Harman opened, followed by Shepard. The closing speeches were given by Gillan for the Conservatives and Joan Ruddock, Harman's deputy, for the Government. A similar debate was held on 8 March 1999. The Minister for Women was a peer, Baroness Jay of Paddington, so her deputy, Tessa Jowell, opened the debate for the Government; Theresa May opened for the Conservatives. Virginia Bottomley closed for the Opposition, and Margaret Hodge did so for Labour.)			Conservative	Hague
Theresa May also Shadow Secretary of State for Education and Employment	15 June 1999	14 September 2001	Conservative	Hague
Caroline Spelman also Shadow Secretary of State for International Development until November 2003 then Shadow Secretary of State for the Environment	14 September 2001	15 March 2004	Conservative	Duncan Smith
Caroline Spelman also Shadow Secretary of State for International Development until November 2003 then Shadow Secretary of State for the Environment	14 September 2001	15 March 2004	Conservative	Howard
Eleanor Laing also Shadow Secretary of State for Scotland from May 2005	15 March 2004	10 May 2005	Conservative	Howard
=== Shadow Minister for Women and Equality ===
Eleanor Laing	8 December 2005	3 July 2007	Conservative	Cameron
Theresa May also Shadow Leader of the House of Commons until January 2009; Shadow Secretary of State for Work and Pensions from January 2009	3 July 2007	11 May 2010	Conservative	Cameron
=== Shadow Minister for Women and Equalities ===
Rosie Winterton also Shadow Leader of the House of Commons	12 May 2010	8 October 2010	Labour	Harman I
Yvette Cooper also Shadow Foreign Secretary until January 2011 then Shadow Home Secretary	8 October 2010	7 October 2013	Labour	Miliband
Gloria De Piero	7 October 2013	14 September 2015	Labour	Miliband
Gloria De Piero	7 October 2013	14 September 2015	Labour	Harman II
Kate Green	14 September 2015	27 June 2016	Labour	Corbyn
Angela Rayner also Shadow Secretary of State for Education	27 June 2016	6 October 2016	Labour	Corbyn
=== Shadow Secretary of State for Women and Equalities ===
Sarah Champion	6 October 2016	16 August 2017	Labour	Corbyn
Dawn Butler	31 August 2017	6 April 2020	Labour	Corbyn
Marsha de Cordova	6 April 2020	14 September 2021	Labour	Starmer
Anneliese Dodds also Chair of the Labour Party	21 September 2021	5 July 2024	Labour	Starmer
=== Shadow Minister for Women and Equalities ===
Mims Davies (Women) also Shadow Secretary of State for Wales from November 2024	8 July 2024	31 August 2026	Conservative	Sunak
Mims Davies (Women) also Shadow Secretary of State for Wales from November 2024	8 July 2024	31 August 2026	Conservative	Badenoch
Claire Coutinho (Equalities) (Note: Saqib Bhatti served as co-shadow minister with Davies in 2025 during Coutinho's first parental leave.) also Shadow Secretary of State for Energy Security and Net Zero	6 November 2024	31 August 2026	Conservative	Badenoch
Joy Morrissey	31 August 2026	Incumbent	Conservative	Badenoch

== See also ==
- Official Opposition frontbench
