= Miliband shadow cabinet =

UK shadow cabinet from 2010 to 2015

Miliband Shadow Cabinet
- Shadow Cabinet of the United Kingdom
- 2010 – 2015
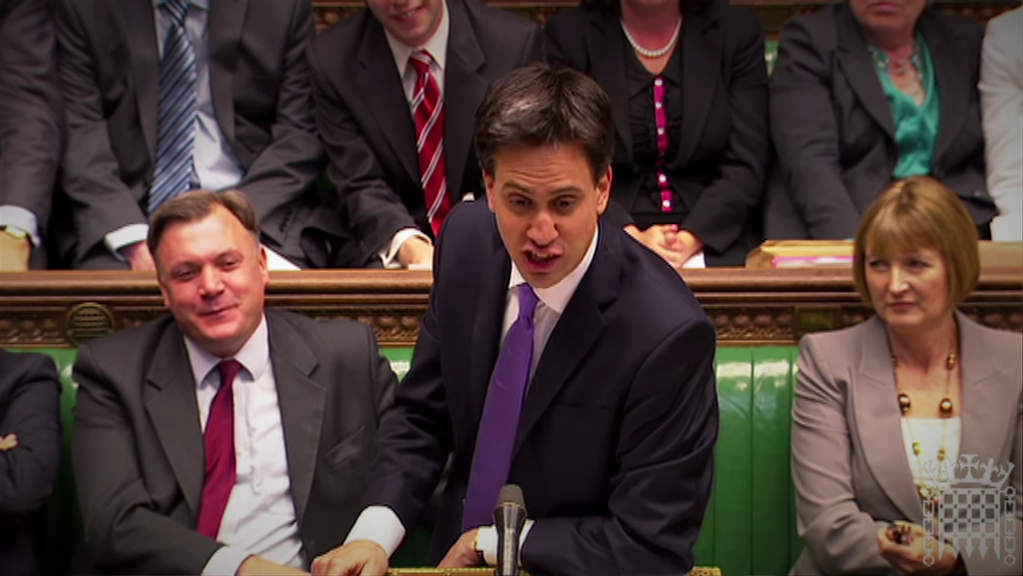
- Miliband with Shadow Chancellor Ed Balls and Shadow Deputy Prime Minister Harriet Harman during Prime Minister's Questions in 2012
- Date formed: 25 September 2010
- Date dissolved: 8 May 2015

People and organisations
- Monarch: Elizabeth II
- Leader of the Opposition: Ed Miliband
- Shadow Deputy Prime Minister: Harriet Harman
- Member party: Labour Party
- Status in legislature: Official Opposition

History
- Election: 2010 Labour leadership election
- Outgoing election: 2015 general election
- Legislature terms: 55th UK Parliament
- Predecessor: First Harman shadow cabinet
- Successor: Second Harman shadow cabinet

Ed Miliband became Leader of the Labour Party and Leader of the Opposition upon being elected to the former post on 25 September 2010. The election was triggered by Gordon Brown's resignation following the party's fall from power at the 2010 general election, which yielded a Conservative–Liberal Democrat Coalition. Miliband appointed his first Shadow Cabinet in October 2010, following the Labour Party Shadow Cabinet elections. These elections were the last such elections before they were abolished in 2011.

Miliband conducted two major reshuffles in 2011 and 2013, with a number of minor changes throughout his term.

Following the 2015 general election and Miliband's resignation, acting leader Harriet Harman announced a new shadow cabinet to last until the election of a new party leader in September 2015.

== Shadow Cabinet ==
=== Initial Shadow Cabinet ===
Miliband announced his first Shadow Cabinet on 8 October 2010 following the 2010 Shadow Cabinet elections. Under the party rules, as amended in 2010, the Shadow Cabinet comprised the Leader, the Deputy Leader, the Leader of the Labour Peers, the Chief Whips in both houses, and 19 MPs elected by the Parliamentary Labour Party.

Sits in the House of Commons
Sits in the House of Lords
Sits in the European Parliament

Portfolio	Shadow Minister	Constituency	Terms
Leader of Her Majesty's Most Loyal Opposition and Leader of the Labour Party	Ed Miliband	Doncaster North	Oct 2010 – May 2015
Shadow Deputy Prime Minister; Deputy Leader of the Opposition	Harriet Harman	Camberwell and Peckham	Oct 2010 – May 2015
Shadow Secretary of State for International Development	Harriet Harman	Camberwell and Peckham	Oct 2010 – Oct 2011
Deputy Leader of the Labour Party; Labour Party Chair	Harriet Harman	Camberwell and Peckham	June 2007 – Sep 2015
Shadow Chancellor of the Exchequer	Alan Johnson	Kingston upon Hull West and Hessle	Oct 2010 – Jan 2011
Shadow Foreign Secretary	Yvette Cooper	Normanton, Pontefract and Castleford	Oct 2010 – Jan 2011
Shadow Minister for Women and Equalities	Yvette Cooper	Normanton, Pontefract and Castleford	May 2010 – Oct 2013
Shadow Home Secretary	Ed Balls	Morley and Outwood	Oct 2010 – Jan 2011
Opposition Chief Whip in the House of Commons	Rosie Winterton	Doncaster Central	Oct 2010 – Oct 2016
Shadow Secretary of State for Education	Andy Burnham	Leigh	Oct 2010 – Oct 2011
Shadow Lord Chancellor; Shadow Secretary of State for Justice (with responsibility for political and constitutional reform)	Sadiq Khan	Tooting	Oct 2010 – May 2015
Shadow Secretary of State for Work and Pensions	Douglas Alexander	Paisley and Renfrewshire South	Oct 2010 – Jan 2011
Shadow Secretary of State for Business, Innovation and Skills	John Denham	Southampton Itchen	Oct 2010 – Oct 2011
Shadow Secretary of State for Health	John Healey	Wentworth and Dearne	Oct 2010 – Oct 2011
Shadow Secretary of State for Communities and Local Government	Caroline Flint	Don Valley	Oct 2010 – Oct 2011
Shadow Secretary of State for Defence	Jim Murphy	East Renfrewshire	Oct 2010 – Oct 2013
Shadow Secretary of State for Energy and Climate Change	Meg Hillier	Hackney South and Shoreditch	Oct 2010 – Oct 2011
Shadow Leader of the House of Commons; Shadow Lord Privy Seal	Hilary Benn	Leeds Central	Oct 2010 – Oct 2011
Shadow Secretary of State for Transport	Maria Eagle	Garston and Halewood	Oct 2010 – Oct 2013
Shadow Secretary of State for Environment, Food and Rural Affairs	Mary Creagh	Wakefield	Oct 2010 – Oct 2013
Shadow Chief Secretary to the Treasury	Angela Eagle	Wallasey	Oct 2010 – Oct 2011
Shadow Secretary of State for Northern Ireland	Shaun Woodward	St Helens South and Whiston	May 2010 – Oct 2011
Shadow Secretary of State for Scotland	Ann McKechin	Glasgow North	Oct 2010 – Oct 2011
Shadow Secretary of State for Wales	Peter Hain	Neath	May 2010 – May 2012
Shadow Secretary of State for Culture, Media and Sport	Ivan Lewis	Bury South	Oct 2010 – Oct 2011
Leader of the Opposition in the House of Lords	Janet Baroness Royall of Blaisdon	Life peer	May 2010 – May 2015
Shadow Minister for the Cabinet Office	Liam Byrne	Birmingham Hodge Hill	Oct 2010 – Jan 2011
Shadow Minister for the Olympics	Tessa Jowell	Dulwich and West Norwood	May 2010 – Sep 2012
Shadow Minister for London	Tessa Jowell	Dulwich and West Norwood	May 2010 – Jan 2013
Opposition Chief Whip in the House of Lords	Steve Lord Bassam of Brighton	Life peer	May 2010 – Jan 2018
Shadow Attorney General	Patricia Scotland	Life peer	May 2010 – Oct 2011
Also attending Shadow Cabinet meetings			
Shadow Minister of State for the Cabinet Office	Jon Trickett	Hemsworth	Oct 2010 – Oct 2011
Leader of the EPLP	Glenis Willmott	East Midlands	Jan 2009 – Oct 2017

==== Subsequent changes ====
- 20 January 2011: Johnson resigned as Shadow Chancellor and was replaced by Ed Balls, who was replaced by Cooper as Shadow Home Secretary. She (while remaining Shadow Equalities Minister) was succeeded as Shadow Foreign Secretary by Alexander, whom Byrne replaced as Shadow Work and Pensions Secretary. Jowell took Byrne's role as Shadow Minister for the Cabinet Office, while retaining her role as Shadow Olympics Minister.

=== 2011 reshuffle ===
On 7 October 2011, Miliband conducted a major reshuffle of his Shadow Cabinet. This followed the Labour Party Conference at which delegates voted to allow the party leader to choose the membership of the Shadow Cabinet, eliminating elections by MPs. Healey chose to stand down from frontline politics and was replaced as Shadow Health Secretary by Andy Burnham, whose Education portfolio went to Stephen Twigg, a newcomer to the Shadow Cabinet, and whose responsibilities as Election Co-ordinator went to Tom Watson, also new to the Shadow Cabinet and who also was given the title "Deputy Chair of the Labour Party". Denham chose to stand down from the Business portfolio, becoming Miliband's Parliamentary Private Secretary. He was replaced by new Shadow Minister of State for Small Business, Chuka Umunna.

Harman and Lewis swapped substantive portfolios (International Development to Lewis and Culture to Harman). Trickett took primary responsibility for shadowing the Cabinet Office from Jowell. The latter retained her position in the Shadow Cabinet as well as her roles as Shadow Minister for London and for the Olympics. Woodward (Northern Ireland) and McKechin (Scotland) were both left out of the Shadow Cabinet, being replaced by newcomers: Vernon Coaker and Margaret Curran, respectively.

Hillier left the Shadow Cabinet, and was replaced at the Energy portfolio by Flint. She was in turn replaced at Communities and Local Government by Benn, whose role as Shadow Leader of the House went to Angela Eagle. She was replaced as Shadow Chief Secretary to the Treasury by Rachel Reeves, who was new to the Shadow Cabinet. Hain retained his responsibilities and was named Chair of the National Policy Forum. Byrne likewise retained his portfolio and added "Policy Review Co-ordinator", reflecting work he had already taken on.

Additionally, Emily Thornberry replaced Patricia Scotland as Shadow Attorney General, with the right to attend Shadow Cabinet, but not full membership. Three others obtained the right to attend Shadow Cabinet: Stewart Lord Wood of Anfield retained his role as a Shadow Minister without Portfolio on the Shadow Cabinet Office team (i.e., the Opposition equivalent of the Cabinet Office). Michael Dugher also became a Shadow Minister without Portfolio with the right to attend Shadow Cabinet meetings. Liz Kendall was appointed Shadow Minister for Care and Older People with the right to attend Shadow Cabinet.

Finally, the Shadow Cabinet list announced on the day of the reshuffle did not note Khan, the Shadow Justice Secretary, as having "responsibility for political and constitutional reform" as it previously had. It is not clear whether he retained this responsibility or it transferred to Harman, whose title has been listed as "Shadow Deputy Prime Minister" instead of "Deputy Leader of the Opposition"; Nick Clegg, the Deputy Prime Minister, was the Government minister with responsibility for political and constitutional reform.

Portfolio	Shadow Minister	Constituency	Term
Leader of Her Majesty's Most Loyal Opposition; Leader of the Labour Party	Ed Miliband	Doncaster North	Oct 2010 – May 2015
Shadow Deputy Prime Minister; Deputy Leader of the Opposition	Harriet Harman	Camberwell and Peckham	Oct 2010 – May 2015
Shadow Secretary of State for Culture, Media and Sport	Harriet Harman	Camberwell and Peckham	Oct 2011 – May 2015
Deputy Leader of the Labour Party; Labour Party Chair	Harriet Harman	Camberwell and Peckham	June 2007 – Sep 2015
Shadow Chancellor of the Exchequer	Ed Balls	Morley and Outwood	Jan 2011 – May 2015
Shadow Foreign Secretary	Douglas Alexander	Paisley and Renfrewshire South	Jan 2011 – May 2015
Shadow Home Secretary	Yvette Cooper	Normanton, Pontefract and Castleford	Jan 2011 – Sep 2015
Shadow Minister for Women and Equalities	Yvette Cooper	Normanton, Pontefract and Castleford	May 2010 – Oct 2013
Shadow Lord Chancellor and Shadow Secretary of State for Justice	Sadiq Khan	Tooting	Oct 2010 – May 2015
Shadow Minister for London	Sadiq Khan	Tooting	Jan 2013 – May 2015
Opposition Chief Whip in the House of Commons	Rosie Winterton	Doncaster Central	Oct 2010 – Oct 2016
Shadow Secretary of State for Health	Andy Burnham	Leigh	Oct 2011 – Sep 2015
Shadow Secretary of State for Education	Stephen Twigg	Liverpool West Derby	Oct 2011 – Oct 2013
Shadow Secretary of State for Business, Innovation and Skills	Chuka Umunna	Streatham	Oct 2011 – Sep 2015
Shadow Secretary of State for Defence	Jim Murphy	East Renfrewshire	Oct 2011 – Oct 2013
Shadow Secretary of State for Communities and Local Government	Hilary Benn	Leeds Central	Oct 2011 – Sep 2015
Shadow Leader of the House of Commons	Angela Eagle	Wallasey	Oct 2011 – Sep 2015
Shadow Chief Secretary to the Treasury	Rachel Reeves	Leeds West	Oct 2011 – Oct 2013
Shadow Secretary of State for Energy and Climate Change	Caroline Flint	Don Valley	Oct 2011 – Sep 2015
Shadow Minister for the Olympics	Tessa Jowell	Dulwich and West Norwood	May 2010 – Jan 2013
Shadow Minister for London	Tessa Jowell	Dulwich and West Norwood	May 2010 – Sep 2012
Shadow Secretary of State for Transport	Maria Eagle	Garston and Halewood	Oct 2010 – Oct 2013
Shadow Secretary of State for Work and Pensions	Liam Byrne	Birmingham Hodge Hill	Jan 2011 – Oct 2013
Policy Review Co-ordinator	Liam Byrne	Birmingham Hodge Hill	Jan 2011 – May 2012
Policy Review Co-ordinator	Jon Cruddas	Dagenham and Rainham	May 2012 – May 2015
Shadow Secretary of State for International Development	Ivan Lewis	Bury South	Oct 2011 – Oct 2013
Shadow Secretary of State for Environment, Food and Rural Affairs	Mary Creagh	Wakefield	Oct 2011 – Oct 2013
Shadow Minister for the Cabinet Office	Jon Trickett	Hemsworth	Oct 2011 – Oct 2013
Deputy Chair of the Labour Party and Campaign Coordinator	Tom Watson	West Bromwich East	Oct 2011 – July 2013
Shadow Secretary of State for Northern Ireland	Vernon Coaker	Gedling	Oct 2011 – Oct 2013
Shadow Secretary of State for Scotland	Margaret Curran	Glasgow East	Oct 2011 – May 2015
Shadow Secretary of State for Wales	Peter Hain	Neath	May 2010 – May 2012
Shadow Secretary of State for Wales	Owen Smith	Pontypridd	May 2012 – Sep 2015
Leader of the Opposition in the House of Lords	Janet Baroness Royall of Blaisdon	Life peer	May 2010 – May 2010
Opposition Chief Whip in the House of Lords	Steve Lord Bassam of Brighton	Life peer	May 2010 – Jan 2018
Also attending Shadow Cabinet meetings
Shadow Minister for Care and Older People	Liz Kendall	Leicester West	Oct 2011 – Sep 2015
Shadow Minister without Portfolio	Michael Dugher	Barnsley East	Oct 2011 – Oct 2013
Shadow Attorney General	Emily Thornberry	Islington South and Finsbury	Oct 2011 – Dec 2014
Shadow Minister without Portfolio	Stewart Lord Wood of Anfield	Life peer	Oct 2011 – May 2015
Leader of the EPLP	Glenis Willmott	East Midlands	Jan 2009 – Oct 2017

==== Subsequent changes ====
- On 15 May 2012, following the resignation of Peter Hain as Shadow Welsh Secretary, Miliband conducted a mini-reshuffle: Owen Smith was appointed to replace Hain, while Jon Cruddas replaced Liam Byrne as Policy Review Co-ordinator.
- On 11 September 2012, Dame Tessa Jowell left the shadow cabinet, after saying she planned to retire from frontline politics.

=== 2013 reshuffle ===
On 7 October 2013, Ed Miliband carried out a reshuffle of his front bench team. The moves included demotions of prominent Blairites including Jim Murphy, who went from Defence to International Development, and Ivan Lewis who moved from International Development to the shadow Northern Ireland portfolio. Also, Liam Byrne and Stephen Twigg moved respectively from Work and Pensions and from Education to junior shadow ministerial positions at Business and Education. Prominent promotions included Tristram Hunt to Education, Rachel Reeves to Work and Pensions, Vernon Coaker to Defence, and Chris Leslie to Shadow Chief Secretary to the Treasury. Douglas Alexander was appointed Chair of General Election Strategy and Planning.

Portfolio	Shadow Minister	Constituency	Term
Leader of Her Majesty's Most Loyal Opposition; Leader of the Labour Party	Ed Miliband	Doncaster North	Oct 2010 – May 2015
Shadow Deputy Prime Minister; Deputy Leader of the Opposition	Harriet Harman	Camberwell and Peckham	Oct 2010 – May 2015
Shadow Secretary of State for Culture, Media and Sport	Harriet Harman	Camberwell and Peckham	Oct 2011 – May 2015
Deputy Leader of the Labour Party; Labour Party Chair	Harriet Harman	Camberwell and Peckham	June 2007 – Sep 2015
Shadow Chancellor of the Exchequer	Ed Balls	Morley and Outwood	Jan 2011 – May 2015
Shadow Foreign Secretary	Douglas Alexander	Paisley and Renfrewshire South	Jan 2011 – May 2015
Shadow Home Secretary	Yvette Cooper	Normanton, Pontefract and Castleford	Jan 2011 – Sep 2015
Opposition Chief Whip in the House of Commons	Rosie Winterton	Doncaster Central	Oct 2010 – Oct 2016
Shadow Lord Chancellor; Shadow Secretary of State for Justice	Sadiq Khan	Tooting	Oct 2010 – May 2015
Shadow Minister for London	Sadiq Khan	Tooting	Jan 2013 – May 2015
Shadow Secretary of State for Health	Andy Burnham	Leigh	Oct 2011 – Sep 2015
Shadow Secretary of State for Education	Tristram Hunt	Stoke-on-Trent Central	Oct 2013 – Sep 2015
Shadow Secretary of State for Business, Innovation and Skills	Chuka Umunna	Streatham	Oct 2011 – Sep 2015
Shadow Secretary of State for Defence	Vernon Coaker	Gedling	Oct 2013 – Sep 2015
Shadow Secretary of State for International Development	Jim Murphy	East Renfrewshire	Oct 2013 – Nov 2014
Shadow Secretary of State for Communities and Local Government	Hilary Benn	Leeds Central	Oct 2011 – May 2015
Shadow Leader of the House of Commons	Angela Eagle	Wallasey	Oct 2011 – Sep 2015
Shadow Secretary of State for Work and Pensions	Rachel Reeves	Leeds West	Oct 2013 – June 2015
Shadow Secretary of State for Energy and Climate Change	Caroline Flint	Don Valley	Oct 2011 – Sep 2015
Shadow Secretary of State for Transport	Mary Creagh	Wakefield	Oct 2013 – Nov 2014
Shadow Secretary of State for Environment, Food and Rural Affairs	Maria Eagle	Garston and Halewood	Oct 2013 – Sep 2015
Shadow Chief Secretary to the Treasury	Chris Leslie	Nottingham East	Oct 2013 – May 2015
Shadow Secretary of State for Scotland	Margaret Curran	Glasgow East	Oct 2011 – May 2015
Shadow Secretary of State for Northern Ireland	Ivan Lewis	Bury South	Oct 2013 – Sep 2015
Shadow Secretary of State for Wales	Owen Smith	Pontypridd	May 2012 – Sep 2015
Shadow Minister for Women and Equalities	Gloria De Piero	Ashfield	Oct 2013 – Sep 2015
Shadow Minister for the Cabinet Office and Head of Communications	Michael Dugher	Barnsley East	Oct 2013 – Sep 2015
Shadow Minister without Portfolio; Deputy Party Chair	Jon Trickett	Hemsworth	Oct 2013 – Sep 2015
Shadow Leader of the House of Lords	Janet Baroness Royall of Blaisdon	Life peer	May 2010 – May 2010
Also attending Shadow Cabinet meetings
Shadow Minister for Housing	Emma Reynolds	Wolverhampton North East	Oct 2013 – May 2015
Shadow Minister for Care and Older People	Liz Kendall	Leicester West	Oct 2011 – Sep 2015
Shadow Attorney General	Emily Thornberry	Islington South and Finsbury	Oct 2011 – Dec 2014
Chair of the Labour Party Policy Review	Jon Cruddas	Dagenham and Rainham	May 2012 – May 2015
Shadow Minister without Portfolio	Stewart Lord Wood of Anfield	Life peer	Oct 2011 – May 2015
Labour Chief Whip in the House of Lords	Steve Lord Bassam of Brighton	Life peer	May 2010 – Jan 2018
Leader of the EPLP	Glenis Willmott	East Midlands	Jan 2009 – Oct 2017

==== Subsequent changes ====
- On 2 November 2014, Jim Murphy resigned as Shadow International Development Secretary to campaign for the leadership of the Scottish Labour Party. Subsequently, on 5 November, a number of changes to the composition of the shadow cabinet were announced: Shadow Transport Secretary Mary Creagh replaced Murphy at International Development, who was replaced by Michael Dugher, hitherto the Shadow Minister for the Cabinet Office; he was in turn replaced by Lucy Powell.
- On 20 November 2014, Emily Thornberry resigned as Shadow Attorney General following a backlash resulting from her sending of a controversial tweet. Willy Lord Bach was named as her replacement on 3 December.

Portfolio	Shadow Minister	Constituency	Term
Leader of Her Majesty's Most Loyal Opposition; Leader of the Labour Party	Ed Miliband	Doncaster North	Oct 2010 – May 2015
Shadow Deputy Prime Minister; Deputy Leader of the Opposition	Harriet Harman	Camberwell and Peckham	Oct 2010 – May 2015
Shadow Secretary of State for Culture, Media and Sport	Harriet Harman	Camberwell and Peckham	Oct 2011 – May 2015
Deputy Leader of the Labour Party; Labour Party Chair	Harriet Harman	Camberwell and Peckham	June 2007 – Sep 2015
Shadow Chancellor of the Exchequer	Ed Balls	Morley and Outwood	Jan 2011 – May 2015
Shadow Foreign Secretary	Douglas Alexander	Paisley and Renfrewshire South	Jan 2011 – May 2015
Shadow Home Secretary	Yvette Cooper	Normanton, Pontefract and Castleford	Jan 2011 – Sep 2015
Opposition Chief Whip in the House of Commons	Rosie Winterton	Doncaster Central	Oct 2010 – Oct 2016
Shadow Lord Chancellor; Shadow Secretary of State for Justice	Sadiq Khan	Tooting	Oct 2010 – May 2015
Shadow Minister for London	Sadiq Khan	Tooting	Jan 2013 – May 2015
Shadow Secretary of State for Health	Andy Burnham	Leigh	Oct 2011 – Sep 2015
Shadow Secretary of State for Education	Tristram Hunt	Stoke-on-Trent Central	Oct 2013 – Sep 2015
Shadow Secretary of State for Business, Innovation and Skills	Chuka Umunna	Streatham	Oct 2011 – Sep 2015
Shadow Secretary of State for Defence	Vernon Coaker	Gedling	Oct 2013 – Sep 2015
Shadow Secretary of State for International Development	Mary Creagh	Garston and Halewood	Nov 2014 – Sep 2015
Shadow Secretary of State for Communities and Local Government	Hilary Benn	Leeds Central	Oct 2011 – May 2015
Shadow Leader of the House of Commons	Angela Eagle	Garston and Halewood	Oct 2011 – Sep 2015
Shadow Secretary of State for Work and Pensions	Rachel Reeves	Leeds West	Oct 2013 – June 2015
Shadow Secretary of State for Energy and Climate Change	Caroline Flint	Don Valley	Oct 2011 – Sep 2015
Shadow Secretary of State for Transport	Michael Dugher	Barnsley East	Nov 2014 – Sep 2015
Shadow Secretary of State for Environment, Food and Rural Affairs	Maria Eagle	Garston and Halewood	Oct 2013 – Sep 2015
Shadow Chief Secretary to the Treasury	Chris Leslie	Nottingham East	Oct 2013 – May 2015
Shadow Secretary of State for Scotland	Margaret Curran	Glasgow East	Oct 2011 – May 2015
Shadow Secretary of State for Northern Ireland	Ivan Lewis	Bury South	Oct 2013 – Sep 2015
Shadow Secretary of State for Wales	Owen Smith	Pontypridd	May 2012 – Sep 2015
Shadow Minister for Women and Equalities	Gloria De Piero	Ashfield	Oct 2013 – Sep 2015
Shadow Minister for the Cabinet Office	Lucy Powell	Manchester Central	Nov 2014 – Sep 2015
Shadow Minister without Portfolio; Deputy Party Chair	Jon Trickett	Hemsworth	Oct 2013 – Sep 2015
Shadow Leader of the House of Lords	Janet Baroness Royall of Blaisdon	Life peer	May 2010 – May 2010
Also attending Shadow Cabinet meetings
Shadow Minister for Housing	Emma Reynolds	Wolverhampton North East	Oct 2013 – May 2015
Shadow Minister for Care and Older People	Liz Kendall	Leicester West	Oct 2011 – Sep 2015
Shadow Attorney General	Willy Bach, Baron Bach	Life peer	Dec 2014 – Sep 2015
Chair of the Labour Party Policy Review	Jon Cruddas	Dagenham and Rainham	May 2012 – May 2015
Shadow Minister without Portfolio	Stewart Lord Wood of Anfield	Life peer	Oct 2011 – May 2015
Labour Chief Whip in the House of Lords	Steve Lord Bassam of Brighton	Life peer	May 2010 – Jan 2018
Leader of the EPLP	Glenis Willmott	East Midlands	Jan 2009 – Oct 2017

== See also ==
- His Majesty's Most Loyal Opposition
- Official Opposition frontbench
- Cabinet of the United Kingdom
- British Government frontbench
- Liberal Democrat frontbench team
- 2010 Labour Party Shadow Cabinet election
