= First Harman shadow cabinet =

UK shadow cabinet in 2010

First Harman Shadow Cabinet
- Shadow Cabinet of the United Kingdom
- May – September 2010
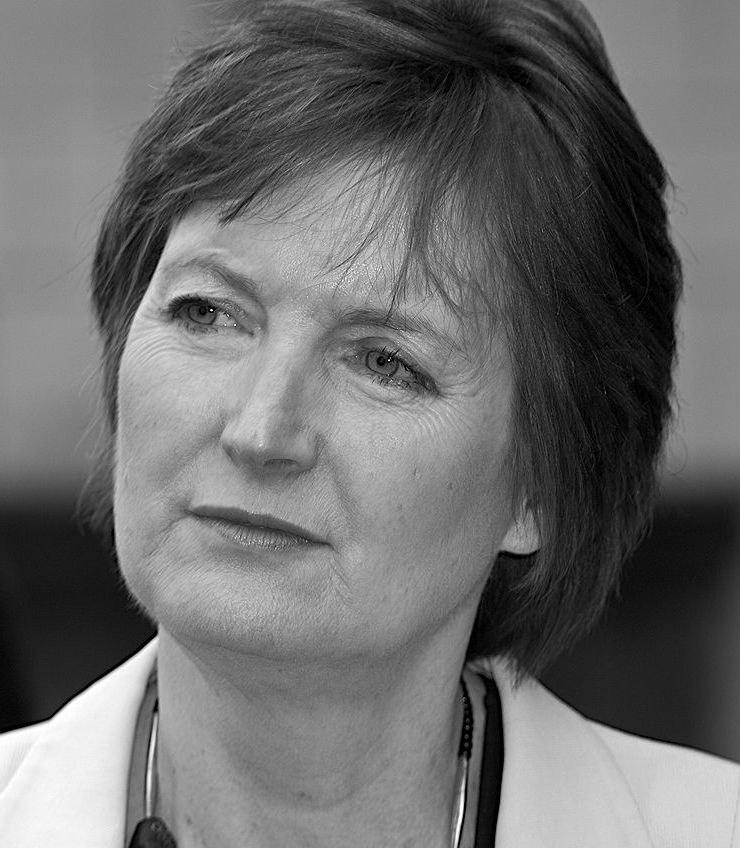
- Date formed: 11 May 2010
- Date dissolved: 25 September 2010

People and organisations
- Monarch: Elizabeth II
- Leader of the Opposition: Harriet Harman
- Shadow Deputy Prime Minister: Jack Straw
- Member party: Labour Party
- Status in legislature: Official Opposition

History
- Election: 2010 general election
- Outgoing election: 2010 Labour leadership election
- Legislature terms: 55th UK Parliament
- Predecessor: Cameron shadow cabinet
- Successor: Miliband shadow cabinet

Harriet Harman led the Shadow Cabinet during her time as pro tempore Leader of the Labour Party in 2010—from the time Gordon Brown resigned as Labour Leader (and Prime Minister) until Ed Miliband was elected to the leadership.

With a few exceptions, Labour Cabinet ministers retained their roles in the Shadow Cabinet. Harman, who had been Leader of the House of Commons, gave the responsibility of shadowing that role to Rosie Winterton, who had attended Cabinet as Minister for Regional Economic Development and Coordination. The two peers who led Cabinet departments, Peter Mandelson at Business, Innovation and Skills and Andrew Adonis at Department for Transport, left the Shadow Cabinet in the first few days after Labour entered opposition. They were replaced by Pat McFadden and Sadiq Khan, previously junior ministers in each respective department.

== Members of the Shadow Cabinet ==
Portfolio	Shadow Minister
Leader of Her Majesty's Most Loyal Opposition; Acting Leader of the Labour Party	The Rt Hon Harriet Harman QC MP
Acting Shadow Deputy Prime Minister; Shadow Secretary of State for Justice; Shadow Lord Chancellor	The Rt Hon Jack Straw MP
Shadow Chancellor of the Exchequer	The Rt Hon Alistair Darling MP
Shadow Foreign Secretary	The Rt Hon David Miliband MP
Shadow Home Secretary	The Rt Hon Alan Johnson MP
Shadow Secretary of State for Defence	The Rt Hon Bob Ainsworth MP
Shadow Secretary of State for Business, Innovation and Skills	The Rt Hon Pat McFadden MP
Shadow Secretary of State for Work and Pensions	The Rt Hon Yvette Cooper MP
Shadow Secretary of State for Energy and Climate Change	The Rt Hon Ed Miliband MP
Shadow Secretary of State for Health	The Rt Hon Andy Burnham MP
Shadow Secretary of State for Education	The Rt Hon Ed Balls MP
Shadow Secretary of State for Communities and Local Government	The Rt Hon John Denham MP
Shadow Secretary of State for Environment, Food and Rural Affairs	The Rt Hon Hilary Benn MP
Shadow Secretary of State for International Development	The Rt Hon Douglas Alexander MP
Shadow Minister for the Cabinet Office; Shadow Minister for the Olympics; Shadow Minister for London	The Rt Hon Tessa Jowell MP
Shadow Secretary of State for Northern Ireland	The Rt Hon Shaun Woodward MP
Shadow Secretary of State for Scotland	The Rt Hon Jim Murphy MP
Shadow Secretary of State for Wales	The Rt Hon Peter Hain MP
Shadow Secretary of State for Culture, Media and Sport	The Rt Hon Ben Bradshaw MP
Leader of the Opposition in the House of Lords	The Rt Hon Janet Royall, Baroness Royall of Blaisdon PC
Shadow Leader of the House of Commons; Shadow Lord Privy Seal; Shadow Minister for Women and Equality	The Rt Hon Rosie Winterton MP
Also attends Shadow Cabinet meetings
Shadow Secretary of State for Transport	The Rt Hon Sadiq Khan MP
Shadow Attorney General for England and Wales	The Rt Hon Patricia Scotland, Baroness Scotland of Asthal PC

=== Changes ===
- Gordon Brown resigned as Leader of the Labour Party and was replaced on an Interim basis by Deputy Leader Harriet Harman
- Harman's previous portfolios were given to Rosie Winterton (Shadow Leader of the House of Commons) and Yvette Cooper (Shadow Minister for Women and Equality)
- Peter Mandelson (First Secretary of State, Secretary of State for Business, Innovation and Skills and Lord President of the Council) resigned and was replaced by Jack Straw (as Shadow Deputy Prime Minister) and Pat McFadden (as Shadow Secretary of State for Business, Innovation and Skills), previously Minister of State for Business, Innovation and Skills.
- Andrew Adonis (Secretary of State for Transport) resigned and was replaced by Sadiq Khan, previously Minister of State for Transport.
