= Minister for the Olympics =

Position within the United Kingdom Government

United Kingdom Minister for the Olympics
- Incumbent; Office not in use since 4 September 2012
- Cabinet Office; Department for Culture, Media and Sport
- Status: Minister of the Crown
- Reports to: The Prime Minister
- Seat: Westminster
- Appointer: The King (on advice of the Prime Minister)
- Term length: At His Majesty's Pleasure
- Inaugural holder: Tessa Jowell
- Formation: 6 July 2005

The Minister for the Olympics was a position within the United Kingdom Government created on 6 July 2005 as a result of the selection of London to host the 2012 Summer Olympics. It was merged into the position of Secretary of State for Culture, Olympics, Media and Sport in May 2010.

Tessa Jowell was the Minister for the entirety of the office's existence. At the time the position was created, she was Secretary of State for Culture, Media and Sport, and she held both roles until the resignation of Tony Blair. In Gordon Brown's cabinet, she continued as Minister for the Olympics, but held the portfolios of Minister for the Cabinet Office and Paymaster General from June 2009 until 11 May 2010, when the Labour government lost the 2010 general election.

Following the 2010 general election, the role was merged with the position of Secretary of State for Culture, Media and Sport to create the Secretary of State for Culture, Olympics, Media and Sport at the beginning of the Cameron Ministry. Jeremy Hunt held the post until the London Paralympics closed, and the post reverted to its old name.

Unlike the Cabinet position, the post in the Shadow Cabinet remained independent from the Shadow Secretary of State for Culture, Media and Sport. Jowell held that post in the Loyal Opposition until September 2012, when the London Paralympics closed and the post was abolished.

== Ministers for the Olympics ==
Minister	Term of office		Political party	Prime Minister
Tessa Jowell	6 July 2005	11 May 2010	Labour	Tony Blair
Tessa Jowell	6 July 2005	11 May 2010	Labour	Gordon Brown
Jeremy Hunt (as Secretary of State for Culture, Olympics, Media and Sport)	11 May 2010	4 September 2012	Conservative	David Cameron (I)
Office abolished

== Shadow ministers ==
Minister	Term of office		Political party	Shadow Cabinet
Shadow Minister for Sport and the Olympics
Hugh Robertson	10 May 2005	6 May 2010	Conservative	Cameron
Tessa Jowell	11 May 2010	11 September 2012	Labour	Harman I
Tessa Jowell	11 May 2010	11 September 2012	Labour	Miliband
