= David Willetts =

British politician

The Right Honourable The Lord Willetts PC FRS HonFRSC HonFREng FAcSS
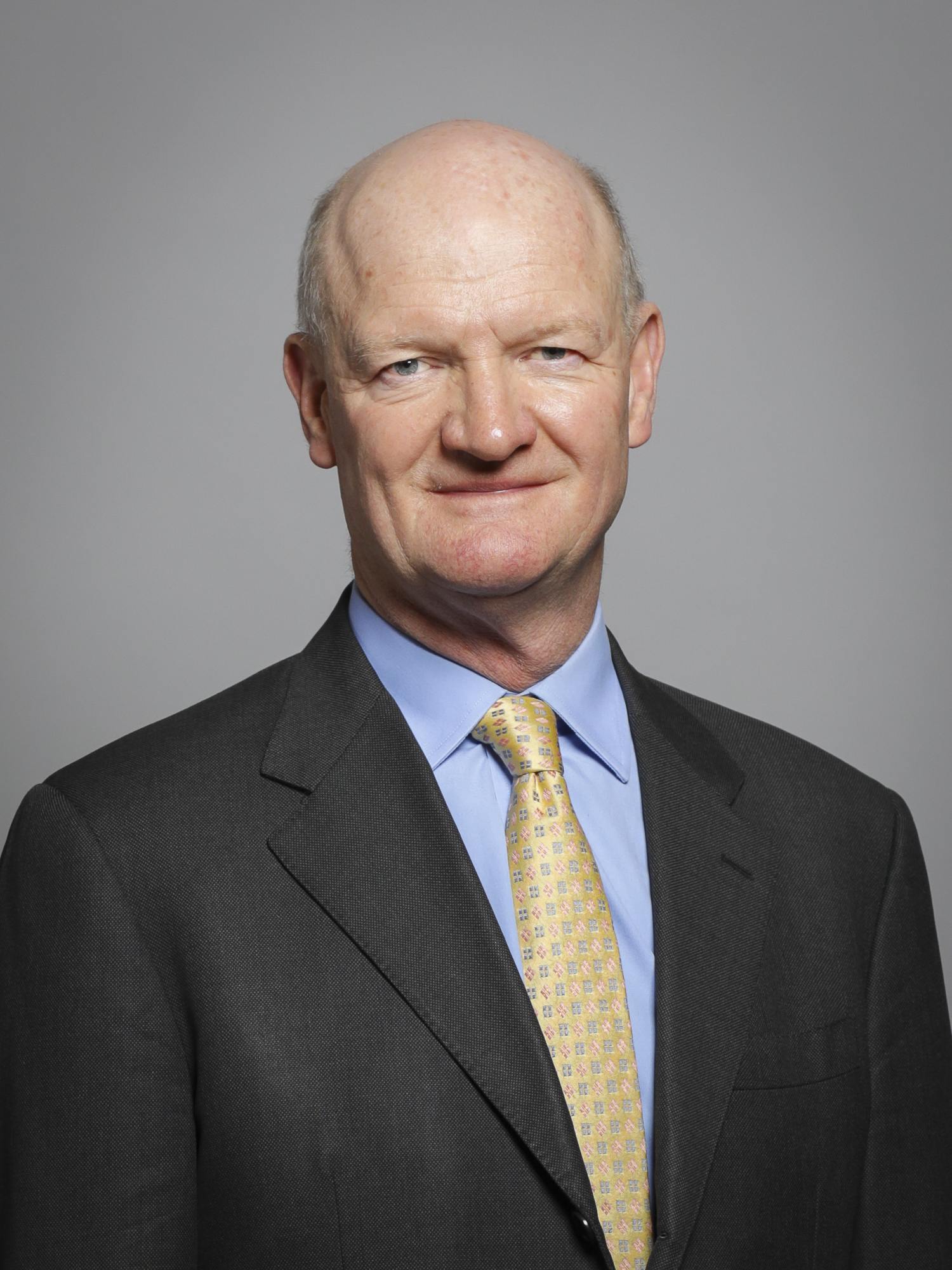
- Official portrait, 2020

Minister of State for Universities and Science
- In office 11 May 2010 – 14 July 2014
- Prime Minister: David Cameron
- Preceded by: David Lammy
- Succeeded by: Greg Clark

Paymaster General
- In office 20 July 1996 – 21 November 1996
- Prime Minister: John Major
- Preceded by: David Heathcoat-Amory
- Succeeded by: Michael Bates

Lord Commissioner of the Treasury
- In office 6 July 1995 – 28 November 1995
- Prime Minister: John Major
- Preceded by: Andrew Mitchell
- Succeeded by: Liam Fox
Shadow cabinet positions
Shadow Secretary of State for Innovation, Universities and Skills
In office 2 July 2007 – 19 January 2009
Leader	David Cameron
Preceded by	Position established
Succeeded by	Kenneth Clarke (Business, Innovation and Skills)
Shadow Secretary of State for Education and Skills
In office 8 December 2005 – 2 July 2007
Leader	David Cameron
Preceded by	David Cameron
Succeeded by	Michael Gove (Children, Schools and Families)
Shadow Secretary of State for Trade and Industry
In office 6 May 2005 – 8 December 2005
Leader	Michael Howard
Preceded by	James Arbuthnot (Trade); Stephen O'Brien (Industry)
Succeeded by	Alan Duncan
Shadow Secretary of State for Work and Pensions Social Security (1999–2001)
In office 15 June 1999 – 6 May 2005
Leader	William Hague; Iain Duncan Smith; Michael Howard
Preceded by	Iain Duncan Smith
Succeeded by	Malcolm Rifkind
Shadow Secretary of State for Education and Employment
In office 1 June 1998 – 15 June 1999
Leader	William Hague
Preceded by	Stephen Dorrell
Succeeded by	Theresa May

Member of the House of Lords
- Lord Temporal
- Life peerage 16 October 2015

Member of Parliament for Havant
- In office 9 April 1992 – 30 March 2015
- Preceded by: Ian Lloyd
- Succeeded by: Alan Mak

Personal details
- Born: David Lindsay Willetts; 9 March 1956 (age 70) Birmingham, England
- Party: Conservative
- Spouse: Sarah Butterfield
- Education: King Edward's School, Birmingham; Christ Church, Oxford
- Website: www.davidwilletts.co.uk

David Lindsay Willetts, Baron Willetts (born 9 March 1956) is a British Conservative politician and life peer. From 1992 to 2015, he was the Member of Parliament representing the constituency of Havant in Hampshire. He served as Minister of State for Universities and Science from 2010 until July 2014 and became a member of the House of Lords in 2015. He was appointed chair of the UK Space Agency's board in April 2022 and chair of the Regulatory Innovation Office in April 2025. He is president of the Resolution Foundation.

Born in Birmingham, Willetts studied philosophy, politics and economics at Christ Church, Oxford. After joining the Treasury as an official in 1978 and serving as Nigel Lawson's private secretary, Willetts moved to Margaret Thatcher's Policy Unit. At age 31, Willetts became head of the Centre for Policy Studies, before entering the House of Commons for Havant at the 1992 general election. He was quickly appointed to a number of positions before being appointed Paymaster General in 1996. During this period, Willetts gained the nickname "Two Brains". However, he was later forced to resign later that year after it was found that he had "dissembled" in his evidence to the Standards and Privileges Committee over whether pressure was put onto an earlier investigation into Conservative MP Neil Hamilton.

Willetts returned to the Conservative frontbench after the party's defeat in the 1997 general election, serving as Shadow Education Secretary before becoming Shadow Work and Pensions Secretary. Following the 2005 election, he served as Shadow Secretary of State for Trade and Industry, and then backed David Davis in the 2005 Conservative leadership election. Despite this, he was appointed Shadow Secretary of State for Education and Skills in David Cameron's shadow cabinet, later becoming Shadow Secretary of State for Innovation, Universities and Skills.

Following the 2010 general election, Prime Minister David Cameron appointed Willetts as the Minister of State for Universities and Science, attending Cabinet, where he pushed forwards with the policy of increasing the cap on tuition fees in England and Wales and sold student loans to Erudio Student Loans, removing £160m from the public debt. Willetts stepped down at the 2015 general election, and was made a life peer in the 2015 Dissolution Honours.

Willetts has pioneered the idea of "civic conservatism", the concept of focusing on the institutions between state and individuals as a policy concern rather than thinking only of individuals and the state. Civic conservatism's focus on a softer social agenda has led journalist Fraser Nelson to call Willetts "The real father of Cameronism".

== Education ==
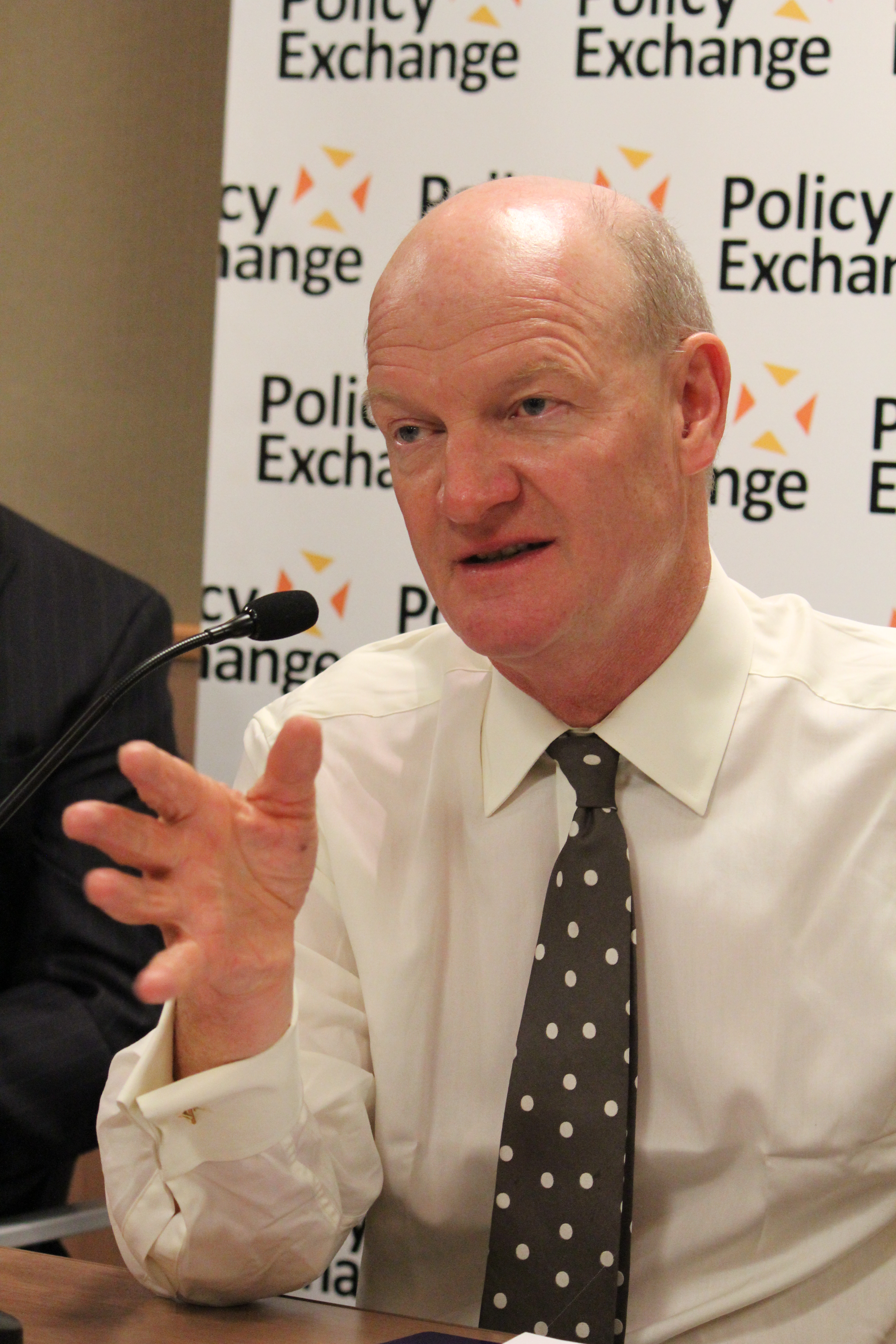
Rt Hon David Willetts MP

Willetts was educated at King Edward's School, Birmingham. He then studied philosophy, politics and economics at Christ Church, Oxford, where he graduated with a first-class degree.

== Policy researcher ==
Having served as Nigel Lawson's Private Secretary, Willetts took charge of the Treasury monetary policy division at 26 before moving over to Margaret Thatcher's Policy Unit at 28. He subsequently took over the Centre for Policy Studies, aged 31.

Paul Foot wrote in Private Eye that in a 1993 document called The Opportunities for Private Funding in the NHS, published by the Social Market Foundation and financed by private healthcare company BUPA, Willetts provided the "intellectual thrust" for private finance initiatives (PFIs) in the National Health Service.

== First period in government ==
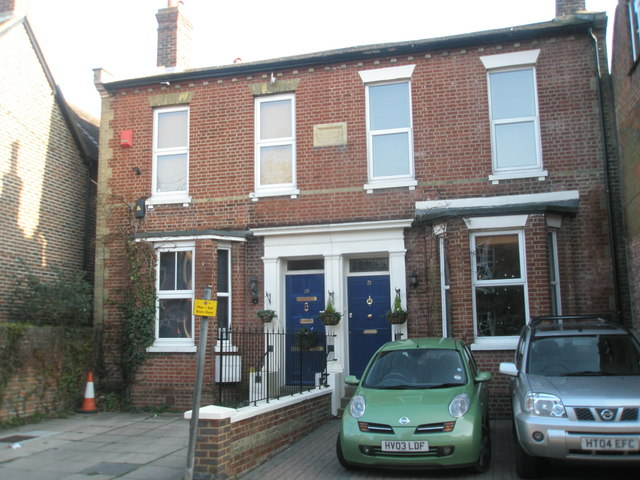
Willetts' constituency office

Aged 36, Willetts entered Parliament in 1992 as the MP for Havant. He quickly established himself in Parliament, becoming a Whip, a Cabinet Office Minister, and then Paymaster General in his first term (when that role was split between the Cabinet Office and HM Treasury as a policy co-ordination role). During this period Willetts gained "Two Brains" as a nickname, a monicker reportedly coined by The Guardian's former political editor Michael White. However, Willetts was forced to resign from the latter post by the Standards and Privileges Committee over an investigation into Neil Hamilton in 1996, when it found that he had "dissembled" in his evidence to the Committee over whether pressure was put onto an earlier investigation into Hamilton.

== Shadow cabinet ==
Despite the resignation, Willetts was able to return to the shadow front bench in 1998 while William Hague was Leader of the Opposition, initially serving in the shadow cabinet as Shadow Education Secretary before becoming Shadow Social Security (later Shadow Work and Pensions) Secretary. He carved out a reputation as an expert on pensions and benefits. After leaving the DWP post, he was recruited as an external consultant by the actuaries Punter Southall.

Following the 2005 election, he served as Shadow Secretary of State for Trade and Industry in the shadow cabinet under Michael Howard. In August 2005, after Willets ruled out running for leader owing to a lack of support, commentators speculated that he was gunning for the post of Shadow Chancellor of the Exchequer and would cut a deal with either David Davis or David Cameron. On 15 September he confirmed his support for Davis, at that time the bookies' favourite. Willetts, a centrist moderniser, went to ground following the announcement of the Davis tax plan since it was widely speculated that he disagreed with the seemingly uncosted and widely derided tax plan and found it impossible to defend. Davis then lost the candidacy race to Cameron.

Following Cameron's win, Willetts was appointed Shadow Secretary of State for Education and Skills in Cameron's first shadow cabinet in December 2005, the role Cameron had vacated, later becoming Shadow Secretary of State for Innovation, Universities and Skills. His title became Shadow Minister for Universities and Skills since Gordon Brown's merger of the Department for Innovation, Universities and Skills with the Department for Business, Enterprise and Regulatory Reform into the Department for Business, Innovation and Skills in June 2009.

On 19 May 2007, Willetts made a controversial speech on grammar schools in which he defended the existing Conservative Party policy of not reintroducing grammar schools. The speech received a mixed reception. The analysis was applauded by The Guardian and The Times. However, The Daily Telegraph was strongly critical of the speech, which was unpopular with some Conservative Party activists. The speech was made more controversial when David Cameron weighed into the argument, backing Willetts' speech and describing his critics as "delusional", accusing them of "splashing around in the shallow end of the educational debate" and of "clinging on to outdated mantras that bear no relation to the reality of life".

The Department for Education and Skills was abolished by the new Prime Minister, Gordon Brown, who established two new departments. On 2 July 2007, Cameron reshuffled Willetts down to the junior of the two departments: the Department for Innovation, Universities and Skills.

== Second period in government ==
Following the 2010 general election, Prime Minister David Cameron appointed Willetts as the Minister of State for Universities and Science.(attending Cabinet)

=== Feminism claim ===
In June 2011, Willetts said during the launch of the Government's social mobility strategy that movement between the classes had "stagnated" over the past 40 years, and Willetts attributed this partly to the entry of women into the workplace and universities for the lack of progress for men. "Feminism trumped egalitarianism", he said . He went on to say that,

"One of the things that happened over that period was that the entirely admirable transformation of opportunities for women meant that with a lot of the expansion of education in the 1960s, '70s and '80s, the first beneficiaries were the daughters of middle-class families who had previously been excluded from educational opportunities [...] And if you put that with what is called 'assortative mating' – that well-educated women marry well-educated men – this transformation of opportunities for women ended up magnifying social divides. It is delicate territory because it is not a bad thing that women had these opportunities, but it widened the gap in household incomes because you suddenly had two-earner couples, both of whom were well-educated, compared with often workless households where nobody was educated".

=== Tuition fees and student loan debts ===
As the minister responsible for universities, Willetts was an advocate and spokesperson for the coalition government's policy of increasing the cap on tuition fees in England and Wales from £3,225 to £9,000 per year.

In November 2013, Willetts announced the sale of student loans to Erudio Student Loans – a debt collection consortium – removing £160m from public debt but ignoring the implications for former students. As Universities Minister he marked the fiftieth anniversary of the Robbins Report with a pamphlet proposing the end of controls on the number of students to be admitted to each university – subsequently announced in the Chancellor's Autumn Statement of December 2013.

=== Science Minister ===
As Science Minister Willetts protected the science budget from proposed cuts and secured a ring-fenced five-year settlement. He created the network of Catapults, as proposed in reports by Herman Hauser and James Dyson. He secured a mission to the Space Station for Tim Peake. He identified the eight great technologies which were then funded with £600m over five years. He negotiated the first systematic use of overseas development funding for research partnerships with emerging scientific powers, the Newton Fund.

=== Peerage and further ventures ===
In July 2014, Willetts announced that he would not contest the next general election, saying that "after more than 20 years the time has come to move onto fresh challenges." In October 2014, Willetts was appointed a visiting professor at King's College London. It was announced that he was to be a life peer in the 2015 Dissolution Honours and was created Baron Willetts, of Havant in the County of Hampshire, on 16 October 2015.

In June 2015, Willetts was appointed executive chair of the think tank the Resolution Foundation. He was Chair of the British Science Association from 2015 to 2018. He served on the Board of UKRI from its creation in 2018 to 2024. In May 2018 he was elected an Honorary Fellow of the Royal Society. In December 2018 he became Chair of the Foundation for Science and Technology. In February 2022 he was appointed a director of the Synbioven investment fund. In April 2022 he was appointed chair of the board of the UK Space Agency. He was appointed chair of the new Regulatory Innovation Office in April 2025.

=== Brexit ===
In December 2018, Willetts was one of the signatories of a statement by some senior Conservatives calling for a second referendum over Brexit. This stated,

"If we are to remain a party of government, it is absolutely critical that we increase our support among younger generations. To do this, we must listen to and engage with their concerns on Brexit. They voted overwhelmingly to Remain in the European Union in 2016 – and since then have become even stronger in their views. Since the referendum, nearly 2 million young people are now of voting age. Of those in this group who are certain to vote, an astounding 87% support the United Kingdom staying in the European Union. If we do not hear their voices, who could blame them for feeling excluded and powerless on this most vital issue. The truth is that if Brexit fails this generation, we risk losing young people for good. Our party's electoral future will be irrevocably blighted."

In early 2019, he co-founded the group Right to Vote.

== Free votes record ==
According to the Public Whip analyses, Willetts was strongly in favour of an elected House of Lords and was strongly against the ban on fox hunting. TheyWorkForYou additionally records that, amongst other things, Willetts was strongly in favour of the Iraq War, strongly in favour of an investigation into it, moderately against equal gay rights, and very strongly for replacing Trident.

== Other interests ==
Following his decision to stand down at the 2015 General Election, Willetts joined the Resolution Foundation in Summer 2015. He Chaired the Foundation's Intergenerational Commission between 2016 and 2018, and is now President of the Resolution Foundation, along with its Intergenerational Centre. He is currently a visiting professor at King's College London where he works with the Policy Institute at King's, a board member of the Institute for Fiscal Studies and an honorary fellow of Nuffield College, Oxford. On 9 February 2018, the University of Leicester announced they had elected David Willetts as successor to Bruce Grocott to become their new chancellor a post he held until 2023.

Willetts is the author of several books on conservatism, including "Why Vote Conservative" (1996) and "Modern Conservatism" (1992), as well as numerous articles. His book "The Pinch: How the Baby Boomers Took Their Children's Future - and Why they should Give it Back" was published in 2010 with a second updated edition in 2019. "A University Education" was published in 2017. He was a founding signatory in 2005 of the Henry Jackson Society principles, advocating a proactive approach to the spread of liberal democracy across the world, including when necessary by military intervention. He is an honorary member of Conservative Friends of Poland.

== Civic conservatism ==
Willetts has pioneered the idea of "civic conservatism". This is the idea of focusing on the institutions between the state and individuals as a policy concern (rather than merely thinking of individuals and the state as the only agencies) and is one of the principles behind the increasing support in the Conservative Party's localist agenda and its emphasis on voluntary organisations. Willetts civic conservatism moves away from the "hard-edged" nature of Thatcherism to a softer social agenda. During an interview with The Spectator, he was referred to as 'the real father of Cameronism' by Fraser Nelson.

Fourteen years after the publication of "Civic Conservatism" Willetts gave the inaugural Oakeshott Memorial Lecture to the London School of Economics in which he made an attempt to explain how game theory can be used to help think about how to improve social capital. The lecture was described by the Times as "an audacious attempt by the Conservative Party's leading intellectual to relate a new Tory narrative".

Civic conservatism, like free market economics, proceeds from deep-seated individual self-interest towards a stable cooperation. It sets the Tories the task not of changing humanity but of designing institutions and arrangements that encourage our natural reciprocal altruism.

== Personal life ==
Willetts is married to artist Sarah Butterfield. The couple have one daughter, born 1988, and one son, born 1992. His wealth in 2009 was estimated at £1.9m.

== Honours ==
Willetts was sworn in as a member of the Privy Council in 2010, giving him the honorific title "The Right Honourable" and after ennoblement the post nominal letters "PC" for life.

=== Scholastic ===
University degrees

Location	Date	School	Degree
England		Christ Church, Oxford	First-class honours Bachelor of Arts (BA) in PPE

Chancellor, visitor, governor, and fellowships

Location	Date	School	Position
England	21 October 2014 –	King's College London	Visiting Professor
England	July 2018 – March 2023	University of Leicester	Chancellor
England	–	Nuffield College, Oxford	Honorary Fellow

Honorary degrees

Location	Date	School	Degree
England	21 November 2014	University of Bedfordshire	Doctor of Arts (D.Arts)
England	17 July 2016	University of Leicester	Doctor of Laws (LL.D.)
England	4 July 2017	University of Bath	Doctor of Laws (LL.D.)
England	2017	Richmond, The American International University in London	Doctor of Public Administration (DPA)
England	2017	University of Chester	Doctor of Letters (D.Litt.)

=== Memberships and fellowships ===
Country	Date	Organisation	Position
United Kingdom	2014 –	Academy of Social Sciences	Fellow (FAcSS)
United Kingdom	2016 –	Academy of Medical Sciences	Honorary Fellow (FMedSci)
United Kingdom	2017 –	Royal Society of Chemistry	Honorary Fellow (HonFRSC)
United Kingdom	2018 –	Royal Society	Honorary Fellow (FRS)
United Kingdom	2023 –	Royal Academy of Engineering	Honorary Fellow (FREng)

== Published works ==
- The Role of the Prime Minister's Policy Unit, Public Administration, Vol. 65 No.4, Winter 1987, Basil Blackwell for The Royal Institute of Public Administration.
- Willetts, David (1991). Happy Families? Four Points to a Conservative Family Policy. ISBN 978-1-870265-62-1.
- Willetts, David (1992). Modern Conservatism. ISBN 978-0-14-015477-1.
- Willetts, David (1992). Welfare to Work. ISBN 978-1-874097-18-1.
- Willetts, David (1993). The Age of Entitlement. ISBN 978-1-874097-04-4.
- Willetts, David (1994). Civic Conservatism. ISBN 978-1-874097-40-2.
- Willetts, David (1996). Blair's Gurus. ISBN 978-1-897969-47-2.
- Willetts, David (1998). Welfare to Work. ISBN 978-1-874097-18-1.
- Willetts, David (1997). Why Vote Conservative?. ISBN 978-0-14-026304-6.
- Willetts, David (1998). Who do we think we are?. ISBN 978-1-897969-81-6.
- Willetts, David (1999). After the Landslide: Learning the lessons from 1906 and 1945. ISBN 978-1-897969-99-1.
- Willetts, David; Willetts, Hillman; Bogdanor, Adam (2003). Left Out, Left Behind. ISBN 978-0-9545611-0-9.
- Willetts, David (2003). Old Europe? Demographic Change and Pension Reform. ISBN 978-1-901229-47-9.
- Willetts, David (2006). The Future of Meritocracy, in G.Dench (eds), The Rise and Rise of Meritocracy Blackwell, 2006. ISBN 978-1-4051-4719-4.
- Willetts, David (2010). The Pinch: How the Baby Boomers Took Their Children's Future – And Why They Should Give It Back. ISBN 978-1-84887-231-8.
- Willetts, David (2013). Eight Great Technologies, Policy Exchange. ISBN 978-1-907689-40-6.
- Willetts, David (2013). Robbins Revisited, Bigger and Better Higher Education, Social Market Foundation, October 2013. ISBN 978-1-904899-84-6.
- Willetts, David (2017). A University Education. ISBN 978-0-19-876726-8.
- Willetts, David (2019). The Pinch: How the baby boomers took their children's future – and why they should give it back,. ISBN 978-1-78649-122-0.
- Willetts, David (2019). The Road to 2.4%: Transforming Britain's R&D Performance The Policy Institute, King's College London.
- Willetts, David (2021). Boosting higher education while cutting public spending, Higher Education Policy Institute.
- Willetts, David (2023). The Eight Great Technologies: Ten Years On, Policy Exchange.
- Willetts, David (2023). How Higher Education can boost people-powered Growth, Resolution Foundation,. ISBN 978-1-78649-122-0.
- Willetts, David (2025). Are Universities Worth it? A review of the evidence and the policy options, The Policy Institute, King's College London.
- Willetts, David (2025). How To Do Industrial Strategy, A Guide for Practitioners, Resolution Foundation,.
- Willetts, David (2025). The Future of the Centre-Right: The British Case in Klaus Welle & Federico Ottavio Reho (eds) Christian Democracy, Conservatism and the Challenge of the Extremes Eburon, Utrecht. ISBN 978-94-6301-524-0.
- Willetts, David (2025). Business Schools:Time for Change in Nicholas O'Regan and George Feiger (eds) Reconnecting Business Schools with Business, Routledge. ISBN 978-1-032-87554-5.

Parliament of the United Kingdom
Preceded by Ian Lloyd	Member of Parliament for Havant; 1992–2015	Succeeded by Alan Mak
Political offices
Preceded by David Heathcoat-Amory	Paymaster General; 1996	Succeeded by Michael Bates
Preceded by Stephen Dorrell	Shadow Secretary of State for Education and Employment; 1998–1999	Succeeded by Theresa May
Preceded by Iain Duncan Smith	Shadow Secretary of State for Social Security; 1999–2001	Succeeded by Himself as Shadow Secretary of State for Work and Pensions
Preceded by Himself as Shadow Secretary of State for Social Security	Shadow Secretary of State for Work and Pensions; 2001–2005	Succeeded by Malcolm Rifkind
Preceded by James Arbuthnot as Shadow Secretary of State for Trade	Shadow Secretary of State for Trade and Industry; 2005	Succeeded by Alan Duncan
Preceded by Stephen O'Brien as Shadow Secretary of State for Industry	Shadow Secretary of State for Trade and Industry; 2005	Succeeded by Alan Duncan
Preceded by David Cameron	Shadow Secretary of State for Education and Skills; 2005–2007	Succeeded by Michael Gove as Shadow Secretary of State for Children, Schools and Families
New office	Shadow Secretary of State for Innovation, Universities and Skills; 2007–2009	Position abolished
New office	Shadow Minister for Universities and Skills; 2009–2010	Position abolished
Preceded by The Lord Drayson as Minister of State for Science and Innovation	Minister of State for Universities and Science; 2010–2014	Succeeded by Greg Clark as Minister of State for Universities, Science and Cities
Preceded by David Lammy as Minister of State for Innovation, Universities and Skills	Minister of State for Universities and Science; 2010–2014	Succeeded by Greg Clark as Minister of State for Universities, Science and Cities
Academic offices
Preceded by The Lord Grocott	Chancellor of the University of Leicester; 2018–2023	Followed by Maggie Aderin-Pocock
Orders of precedence in the United Kingdom
Preceded by The Lord Porter of Spalding	Gentlemen; Baron Willetts	Followed by The Lord Bruce of Bennachie
