= Shadow Secretary of State for Business, Innovation, Science and Trade =

Shadow Cabinet office

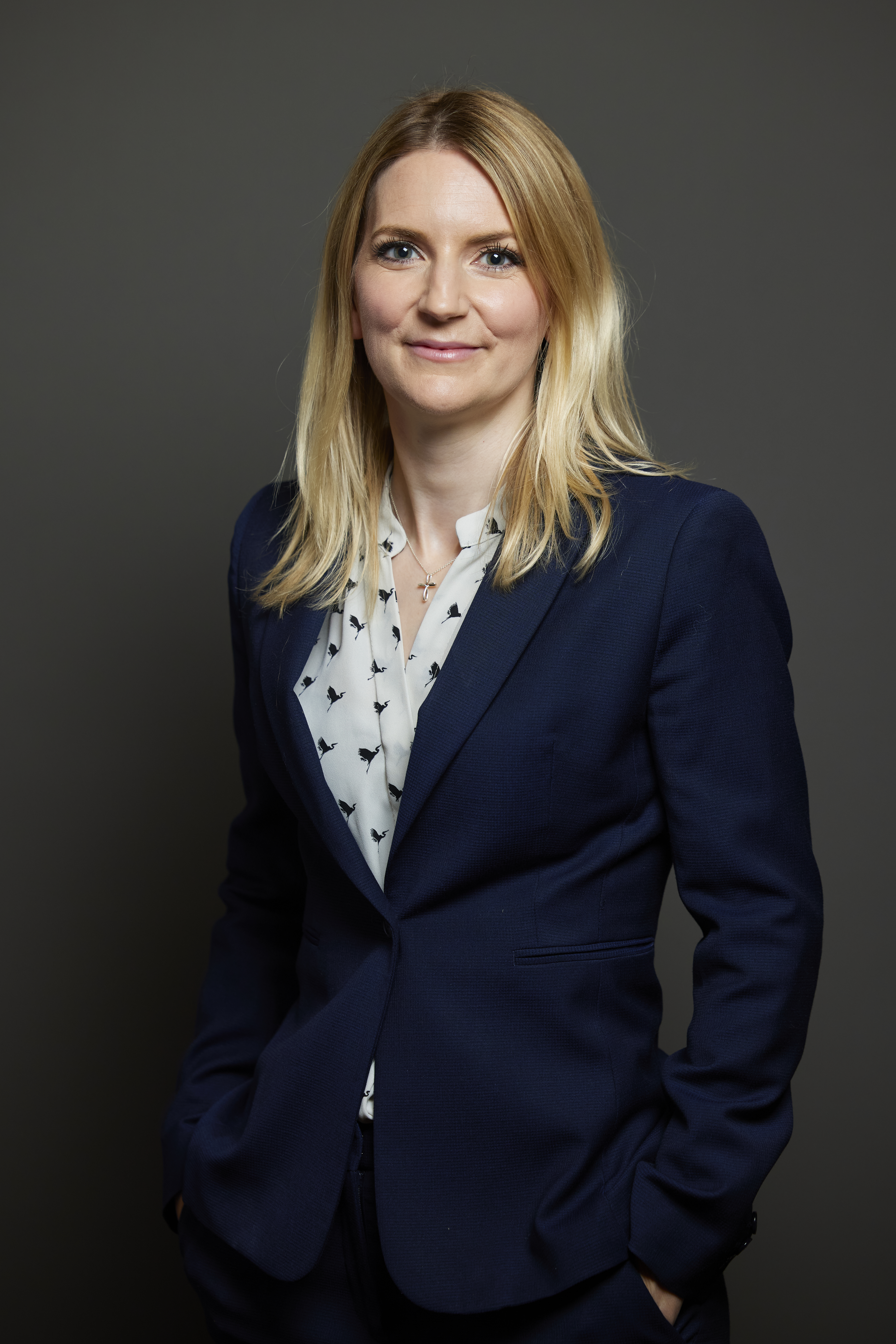
- Incumbent; Julia Lopez (Interim) since 31 August 2026
- Appointer: Leader of the Opposition

The shadow secretary of state for business, Innovation, science and trade is an office within British politics held by a member of His Majesty's Most Loyal Opposition. The duty of the office holder is to scrutinise the actions of the government's secretary of state for business, Innovation, science and trade and develop alternative policies. The office holder is a member of the Shadow Cabinet. The position is currently held by Julia Lopez while Claire Coutinho is in maternity leave.

== List of shadow secretaries ==
=== Shadow President of the Board of Trade ===
Name	Entered office	Left office	Political party	Shadow Cabinet
Harold Wilson	15 July 1955	15 February 1956	Labour	Attlee
Patrick Gordon Walker	15 February 1956	November 1958	Labour	Gaitskell
Dick Mitchison	November 1958	21 February 1963	Labour	Gaitskell
Douglas Jay	21 February 1963	16 October 1964	Labour	Wilson
Edward Heath	16 October 1964	29 October 1964	Conservative	Douglas-Home
Edward du Cann	29 October 1964	16 February 1965	Conservative	Douglas-Home
Anthony Barber	16 February 1965	22 February 1967	Conservative	Douglas-Home
Anthony Barber	16 February 1965	22 February 1967	Conservative	Heath
Keith Joseph	22 February 1967	19 June 1970	Conservative	Heath

=== Shadow Secretary of State for Industry and Technology & President of the Board of Trade ===
=== Shadow Secretary of State for Industry and Technology ===				=== Shadow President of the Board of Trade ===				
Name	Entered office	Left office	Political party	Name	Entered office	Left office	Political party	Shadow Cabinet
Tony Benn	19 June 1970	15 October 1970	Labour	Roy Mason	19 June 1970	15 October 1970	Labour	Wilson II

=== Shadow Secretary of State for Trade and Industry ===
Name	Entered office	Left office	Political party	Shadow Cabinet
Tony Benn	15 October 1970	4 March 1974	Labour	Wilson II
Peter Walker	4 March 1974	19 June 1974	Conservative	Heath II
Michael Heseltine	19 June 1974	18 February 1975	Conservative	Heath II

=== Shadow Secretary of State for Industry ===				=== Shadow Minister for Trade ===				
Name	Entered office	Left office	Political party	Name	Entered office	Left office	Political party	Shadow Cabinet
Michael Heseltine	18 February 1975	19 November 1976	Conservative	Terence Higgins	18 February 1975	19 November 1976	Conservative	Thatcher
John Biffen	19 November 1976	28 February 1977	Conservative	Teddy Taylor	19 November 1976	9 December 1976	Conservative	Thatcher
John Biffen	19 November 1976	28 February 1977	Conservative	John Nott	December 1976	4 May 1979	Conservative	Thatcher
Keith Joseph	28 February 1977	4 May 1979	Conservative	John Nott	December 1976	4 May 1979	Conservative	Thatcher
Eric Varley	4 May 1979	14 July 1979	Labour	John Smith	4 May 1979	24 November 1982	Labour	Callaghan
John Silkin	14 July 1979	4 November 1980	Labour	John Smith	4 May 1979	24 November 1982	Labour	Callaghan
Stan Orme	4 November 1980	31 October 1983	Labour	John Smith	4 May 1979	24 November 1982	Labour	Foot
Stan Orme	4 November 1980	31 October 1983	Labour	Peter Archer	24 November 1982	31 October 1983	Labour	Foot

=== Shadow Secretary of State for Trade and Industry & President of the Board of Trade ===
Name	Entered office	Left office	Political party	Shadow Cabinet
Peter Shore	31 October 1983	26 October 1984	Labour	Kinnock
John Smith	26 October 1984	13 July 1987	Labour	Kinnock
Bryan Gould	13 July 1987	2 November 1989	Labour	Kinnock
Gordon Brown	2 November 1989	18 July 1992	Labour	Kinnock
Robin Cook	18 July 1992	20 October 1994	Labour	Smith; Beckett
Jack Cunningham	20 October 1994	19 October 1995	Labour	Blair
Margaret Beckett	19 October 1995	2 May 1997	Labour	Blair
Michael Heseltine	2 May 1997	11 June 1997	Conservative	Major
John Redwood	11 June 1997	15 June 1999	Conservative	Hague
Angela Browning	15 June 1999	26 September 2000	Conservative	Hague
David Heathcoat-Amory	26 September 2000	18 September 2001	Conservative	Hague
John Whittingdale	18 September 2001	23 July 2002	Conservative	Duncan Smith
Tim Yeo	23 July 2002	11 November 2003	Conservative	Duncan Smith

=== Shadow Secretary of State for Industry ===	=== Shadow Secretary of State for Trade ===	Entered office	Left office	Political party	Shadow Cabinet
Stephen O'Brien	James Arbuthnot	11 November 2003	6 May 2005	Conservative	Howard

=== Shadow Secretary of State for Trade and Industry & President of the Board of Trade ===
Name	Entered office	Left office	Political party	Shadow Cabinet
David Willetts	6 May 2005	8 December 2005	Conservative	Howard
Alan Duncan	8 December 2005	2 July 2007	Conservative	Cameron
=== Shadow Secretary of State for Business, Enterprise and Regulatory Reform ===
Alan Duncan	2 July 2007	19 January 2009	Conservative	Cameron
=== Shadow Secretary of State for Business, Innovation and Skills ===
Kenneth Clarke	19 January 2009	11 May 2010	Conservative	Cameron
Pat McFadden	11 May 2010	8 October 2010	Labour	Harman
John Denham	8 October 2010	7 October 2011	Labour	Miliband
Chuka Umunna	7 October 2011	13 September 2015	Labour	Miliband
Chuka Umunna	7 October 2011	13 September 2015	Labour	Harman II
Angela Eagle	13 September 2015	27 June 2016	Labour	Corbyn
Jon Trickett	5 July 2016	6 October 2016	Labour	Corbyn

=== Shadow Secretary of State for Business, Energy and Industrial Strategy ===				=== Shadow Secretaries of State for International Trade ===				
Clive Lewis	6 October 2016	8 February 2017	Labour	Barry Gardiner	14 July 2016	6 April 2020	Labour	Corbyn
Rebecca Long-Bailey	9 February 2017	6 April 2020	Labour	Barry Gardiner	14 July 2016	6 April 2020	Labour	Corbyn
Ed Miliband	6 April 2020	29 November 2021	Labour	Emily Thornberry	6 April 2020	29 November 2021	Labour	Starmer
=== Shadow Secretary of State for Business and Industrial Strategy ===				Nick Thomas-Symonds	29 November 2021	4 September 2023	Labour	Starmer
Jonathan Reynolds	29 November 2021	7 February 2023	Labour	Nick Thomas-Symonds	29 November 2021	4 September 2023	Labour	Starmer

=== Shadow Secretary of State for Business and Trade ===
Jonathan Reynolds	7 February 2023	5 July 2024	Labour	Starmer
Kevin Hollinrake	8 July 2024	5 November 2024	Conservative	Sunak
Andrew Griffith	5 November 2024	31 August 2026	Conservative	Badenoch

=== Shadow Secretary of State for Business, Innovation, Science and Trade ===
Julia Lopez; Acting	31 August 2026	January 2027	Conservative	Badenoch
Claire Coutinho	31 August 2026; January 2027	On leave	Conservative	Badenoch
