= Major shadow cabinet =

Shadow Cabinet of the United Kingdom in 1997

Major Shadow Cabinet
- Shadow cabinet of the United Kingdom
- May – June 1997
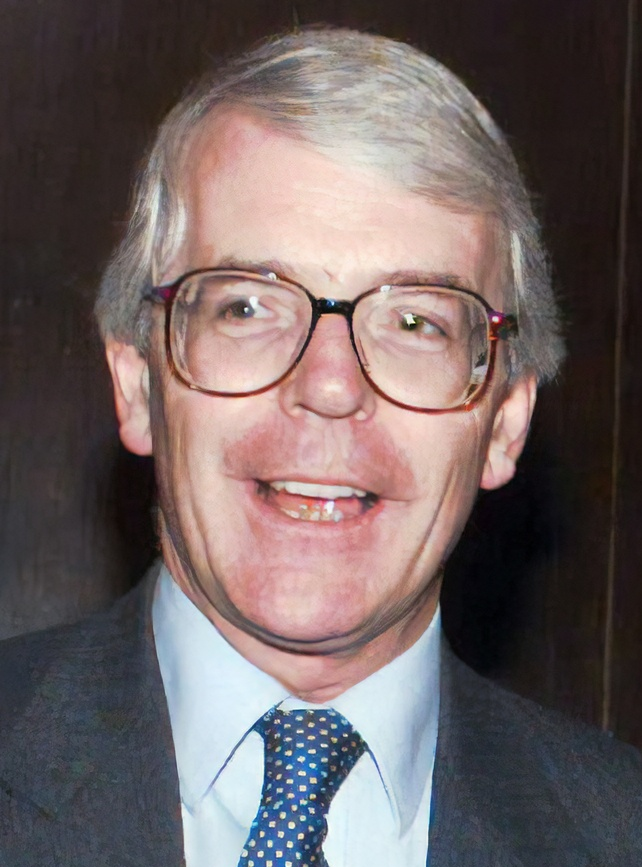
- Date formed: 2 May 1997
- Date dissolved: 19 June 1997

People and organisations
- Monarch: Elizabeth II
- Leader of the Opposition: John Major
- Deputy Leader of the Opposition: Michael Heseltine
- Member party: Conservative Party
- Status in legislature: Official Opposition

History
- Election: 1997 general election
- Outgoing election: 1997 Conservative Party leadership election
- Legislature terms: 52nd UK Parliament
- Predecessor: Blair shadow cabinet
- Successor: Hague shadow cabinet

John Major was Leader of the Conservative Party and Leader of the Opposition from 2 May 1997, following his defeat at the 1997 general election, until 19 June 1997, when William Hague was elected to succeed him. Following the defeat, Major announced his resignation as leader. But, for logistical reasons, a new leader could not be elected for several weeks. In the intervening period, Major appointed an interim Shadow Cabinet.

The Shadow Cabinet was based on Major's final Cabinet. However, as seven Cabinet Ministers had lost their seats in the general election and another had not contested his seat, there were several vacancies. These were largely filled by either Major himself or by a relevant minister in the outgoing Cabinet. The position of Shadow Secretary of State for Scotland was not filled as the Conservatives had lost all their Scottish MPs in the election. Michael Howard (Shadow Home Secretary) and William Hague (Shadow Wales Secretary) were given joint responsibility for constitutional matters, including the brief to handle the Scottish and Welsh devolution legislation.

== Shadow Cabinet list ==
Portfolio	Shadow Minister
Leader of Her Majesty's Most Loyal Opposition; Leader of the Conservative Party; Shadow Foreign Secretary; Shadow Secretary of State for Defence	John Major
Deputy Leader of the Opposition; Shadow Chancellor of the Duchy of Lancaster; Shadow Secretary of State for Trade and Industry	Michael Heseltine
Shadow Chancellor of the Exchequer	Kenneth Clarke
Shadow Home Secretary; Shadow Minister with special interest in constitutional matters	Michael Howard
Shadow Secretary of State for Health	Stephen Dorrell
Shadow Secretary of State for Education and Employment	Gillian Shephard
Shadow Secretary of State for Social Security	Peter Lilley
Shadow Secretary of State for Transport	Sir George Young
Shadow Secretary of State for Wales; Shadow Minister with special interest in constitutional matters	William Hague
Shadow Minister of Agriculture, Fisheries and Food	Douglas Hogg
Shadow Lord Chancellor	James Mackay, Lord Mackay of Clashfern
Shadow Secretary of State for the Environment	John Gummer
Shadow Secretary of State for National Heritage	Virginia Bottomley
Leader of the Opposition in the House of Lords	Viscount Cranborne
Chairman of the Conservative Party	Brian Mawhinney
Shadow Leader of the House of Commons; Opposition Chief Whip	Alastair Goodlad

Changes from final Cabinet

- Malcolm Rifkind (Foreign Secretary) lost his seat and was replaced by Major himself, who had previously been Foreign Secretary in 1989.
- Michael Portillo (Defence Secretary) lost his seat and was replaced by Major himself
- Roger Freeman (Chancellor of the Duchy of Lancaster) lost his seat and was replaced by Deputy leader Michael Heseltine.
- Ian Lang (Secretary of State for Trade and Industry) lost his seat and was replaced by Heseltine, who had previously held the role between 1992 and 1995.
- Tony Newton (Leader of the House of Commons) lost his seat and was replaced by Chief Whip Alastair Goodlad.
