= Shadow Leader of the House of Commons =

British politician role

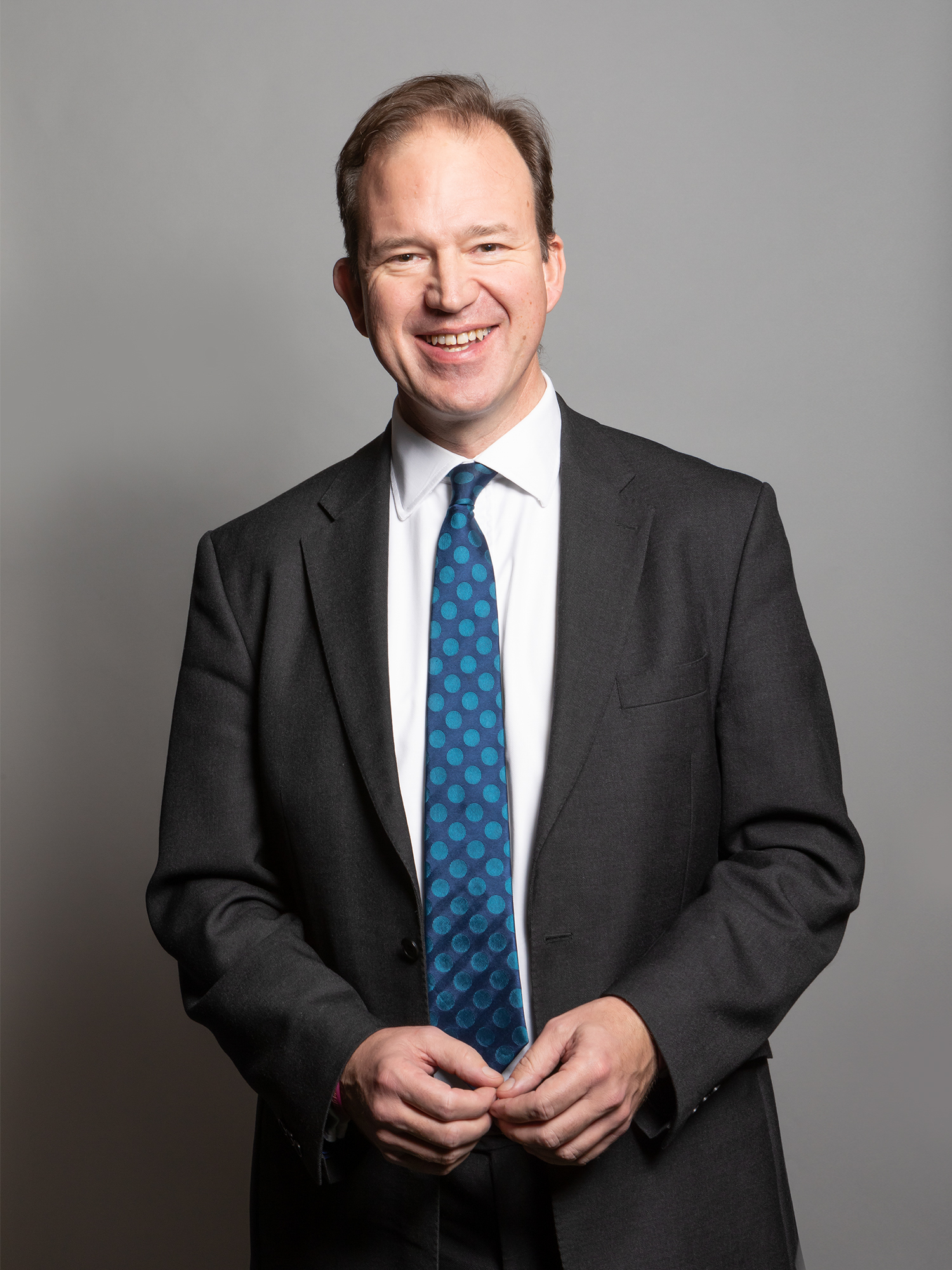
- Incumbent; Jesse Norman since 5 November 2024
- Appointer: Leader of the Opposition
- Deputy: John Lamont, Shadow Deputy Leader of the House of Commons
- Website: The Shadow Cabinet

The Shadow Leader of the House of Commons is a member of the Official Opposition Shadow Cabinet responsible for working with the Leader of the House in arranging Commons business and holding the Government to account in its overall management of the House. The Shadow Leader also responds to the Business Statement of Leader of House each Thursday, though the Leader of the Opposition exercised this role until the late 1980s. The office is roughly equivalent to the Shadow Leader of the House of Lords.

== Shadow Leaders ==
| Name | Portrait | Took office | Left office | Political party | Leader of the Opposition |
|---|---|---|---|---|---|
| James Chuter Ede | | 26 October 1951 | 13 November 1951 | Labour | Attlee |
| Herbert Morrison | | 13 November 1951 | 14 December 1955 | Labour | Attlee |
| Unknown | | 14 December 1955 | 16 October 1964 | Labour | Gaitskell |
| Unknown | | 14 December 1955 | 16 October 1964 | Labour | Brown |
| Unknown | | 14 December 1955 | 16 October 1964 | Labour | Wilson |
| Selwyn Lloyd | | 16 October 1964 (Note: Lloyd was Leader of the House before the Conservatives lost the 1964 election and was "retained" in the portfolio of "co-ordination of the Opposition in the Commons. It is not clear whether the Conservative party at this point used the term "Shadow Leader" to describe the job, but the term was used.) | 4 August 1965 | Conservative | Douglas-Home |
| Unknown/Vacant (Note: Edward Heath reshuffled the Conservative front bench after being elected leader in the summer of 1964, though he rejected the term "Shadow Cabinet" and instituted a "federal system", three Shadow ministers being in charge of a general area (foreign, economic, and home affairs). For example, Alec Douglas-Home headed foreign affairs, sitting above the Shadow Foreign and Defence Secretaries. The former members of the Shadow Cabinet remained, but three members had no specific responsibilities. It is unclear whether Heath himself was in effect Shadow Leader of the House, as would have been common before the Second World War, or the responsibilities were assigned to one or more shadow ministers.) | | 4 August 1965 | 19 June 1970 | Conservative | Heath |
| Fred Peart | | 19 June 1970 (Note: Peart was Leader of the House going into Labour's election loss on 18 June 1970 and left the role of Shadow Leader of the House on 16 December 1971. There is no evidence that anyone else served as Shadow Leader between those dates.) | 16 December 1971 | Labour | Wilson II |
| Michael Foot | | 16 December 1971 | 6 December 1972 | Labour | Wilson II |
| Edward Short | | 6 December 1972 | 4 March 1974 | Labour | Wilson II |
| James Prior | | 4 March 1974 | 29 October 1974 | Conservative | Heath II |
| John Peyton | | 29 October 1974 | 19 November 1976 | Conservative | Heath II |
| John Peyton | | 29 October 1974 | 19 November 1976 | Conservative | Thatcher |
| Francis Pym | | 19 November 1976 | Approx. 20 November 1978 (Note: In October 1978, Pym was made Shadow Foreign Secretary, and St John-Stevas succeeded him.) | Conservative | Thatcher |
| Norman St John-Stevas | | Approx. 20 November 1978 | 5 May 1979 | Conservative | Thatcher |
| Michael Foot | | 5 May 1979 | 8 December 1980 | Labour | Callaghan |
| John Silkin | | 8 December 1980 | 30 October 1983 | Labour | Foot |
| Peter Shore | | 30 October 1983 | 13 July 1987 | Labour | Kinnock |
| Frank Dobson | | 13 July 1987 | 2 November 1989 | Labour | Kinnock |
| Jack Cunningham | | 2 November 1989 | 24 July 1992 | Labour | Kinnock |
| Margaret Beckett | | 24 July 1992 | 13 May 1994 | Labour | Smith |
| Nick Brown (Acting) | | 13 May 1994 | 21 July 1994 | Labour | Beckett |
| Margaret Beckett | | 21 July 1994 | 20 October 1994 | Labour | Blair |
| Ann Taylor | | 20 October 1994 | 2 May 1997 | Labour | Blair |
| Alastair Goodlad | | May 1997 | 30 June 1997 | Conservative | Major |
| Gillian Shephard | | 30 June 1997 | 2 June 1998 | Conservative | Hague |
| Sir George Young | | 1 June 1998 | 22 September 2000 | Conservative | Hague |
| Angela Browning | | 26 September 2000 | 18 September 2001 | Conservative | Hague |
| Eric Forth | | 18 September 2001 | 10 November 2003 | Conservative | Duncan Smith |
| Oliver Heald | | 10 November 2003 | 10 May 2005 | Conservative | Howard |
| Chris Grayling | | 10 May 2005 | 8 December 2005 | Conservative | Howard |
| Theresa May | | 8 December 2005 | 19 January 2009 | Conservative | Cameron |
| Alan Duncan | | 19 January 2009 | 7 September 2009 | Conservative | Cameron |
| Sir George Young | | 8 September 2009 | 11 May 2010 | Conservative | Cameron |
| Rosie Winterton | | 12 May 2010 | 8 October 2010 | Labour | Harman I |
| Hilary Benn | | 8 October 2010 | 7 October 2011 | Labour | Miliband |
| Angela Eagle | | 7 October 2011 | 13 September 2015 | Labour | Miliband |
| Angela Eagle | | 7 October 2011 | 13 September 2015 | Labour | Harman II |
| Chris Bryant | | 13 September 2015 | 26 June 2016 | Labour | Corbyn |
| Paul Flynn | | 4 July 2016 | 6 October 2016 | Labour | Corbyn |
| Valerie Vaz | | 6 October 2016 | 9 May 2021 | Labour | Corbyn |
| Valerie Vaz | | 6 October 2016 | 9 May 2021 | Labour | Starmer |
| Thangam Debbonaire | | 9 May 2021 | 4 September 2023 | Labour | Starmer |
| Lucy Powell | | 4 September 2023 | 5 July 2024 | Labour | Starmer |
| Chris Philp | | 8 July 2024 | 5 November 2024 | Conservative | Sunak |
| Jesse Norman | | 5 November 2024 | Incumbent | Conservative | Badenoch |

=== Shadow deputy leaders ===
| Name | Portrait | Took office | Left office | Political party | Leader of the Opposition |
|---|---|---|---|---|---|
| Barbara Keeley | | 12 May 2010 | 8 October 2010 | Labour | Harman |
| Melanie Onn | | 18 September 2015 | 27 June 2016 | Labour | Corbyn |
| Cat Smith | | 20 December 2016 | 19 July 2017 | Labour | Corbyn |
| Karin Smyth | | 19 July 2017 | 10 April 2020 | Labour | Corbyn |
| Afzal Khan | | 10 April 2020 | 4 December 2021 | Labour Co-op | Starmer |
| Jessica Morden | | 4 December 2021 | 6 September 2023 | Labour | Starmer |
| Nick Smith | | 5 September 2023 | 5 July 2024 | Labour | Starmer |
| John Lamont | | 22 July 2025 | Incumbent | Conservative | Badenoch |

== See also ==
- Opposition House Leader (Canada)
