= Cameron shadow cabinet =

UK shadow cabinet from 2005 to 2010

Cameron Shadow Cabinet
- Shadow Cabinet of the United Kingdom
- 2005 – 2010
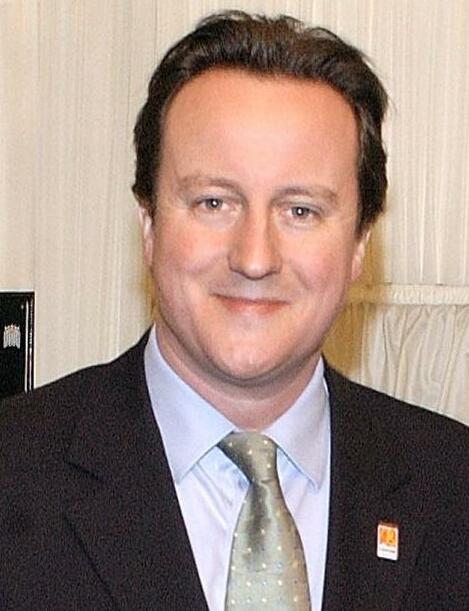
- Date formed: 6 December 2005
- Date dissolved: 11 May 2010

People and organisations
- Monarch: Elizabeth II
- Leader of the Opposition: David Cameron
- Deputy Leader of the Opposition: William Hague
- Member party: Conservative Party
- Status in legislature: Official Opposition

History
- Outgoing formation: 2010 government formation
- Election: 2005 Conservative leadership election
- Outgoing election: 2010 general election
- Legislature terms: 54th UK Parliament
- Predecessor: Howard shadow cabinet
- Successor: First Harman shadow cabinet

David Cameron was Leader of the Conservative Party and Leader of the Opposition from his election as Leader on 6 December 2005 until he became Prime Minister on 11 May 2010. His tenure as opposition leader was characterised by opposition to the Great Recession from 2007 to 2009, and his relative youth and inexperience before becoming leader invited satirical comparison with Tony Blair. Cameron sought to rebrand the Conservatives, embracing an increasingly socially liberal position, and introducing the "A-List" to increase the number of female and minority ethnic Conservative MPs.

Cameron had four Shadow Cabinets during his tenure as opposition leader. His Shadow Cabinet appointments included MPs associated with the various wings of the party. Former leader William Hague was appointed to the Foreign Affairs brief, while both George Osborne and David Davis were retained, as Shadow Chancellor of the Exchequer and Shadow Home Secretary respectively. Hague, assisted by Davis, stood in for Cameron during his paternity leave in February 2006. In June 2008, Davis announced his intention to resign as an MP, and was immediately replaced as Shadow Home Secretary by Dominic Grieve; Davis' surprise move was seen as a challenge to the changes introduced under Cameron's leadership.

Under Cameron, the Conservatives made gains in the 2006 local elections, and made further gains in the 2007 and 2008 local elections. With the onset of the Great Recession leading to the Labour government under Gordon Brown taking the blame from a worsening economic climate, soaring unemployment and the expenses scandal, the Conservatives made significant gains in the local and European elections in 2009.

Following the 2010 general election, Cameron became prime minister at the head of a coalition government between the Conservatives and the Liberal Democrats, as no party had gained an overall majority in the House of Commons for the first time since the February 1974 general election. One of the first decisions he made as prime minister was the appointment of Nick Clegg, the leader of the Liberal Democrats, as deputy prime minister.

== Shadow Cabinet (8 December 2005 – 2 July 2007) ==
Cameron appointed his first shadow cabinet in December 2005.

Portfolio	Shadow Minister
Leader of the Conservative Party; Leader of Her Majesty's Most Loyal Opposition	The Rt Hon. David Cameron
Shadow Foreign Secretary; Senior Member of the Shadow Cabinet	The Rt Hon. William Hague
Shadow Chancellor of the Exchequer; General Election Campaign Co-ordinator	George Osborne
Shadow Home Secretary	David Davis
Chairman of the Conservative Party	Francis Maude
Shadow Secretary of State for Constitutional Affairs	Oliver Heald
Shadow Secretary of State for Health	Andrew Lansley CBE
Shadow Secretary of State for Communities and Local Government	Caroline Spelman
Shadow Secretary of State for Education and Skills	David Willetts
Shadow Secretary of State for Defence	Dr. Liam Fox
Shadow Secretary of State for Environment, Food and Rural Affairs	Peter Ainsworth
Shadow Secretary of State for Work and Pensions	Philip Hammond
Shadow Secretary of State for Transport	Chris Grayling
Shadow Leader of the House of Commons	The Rt Hon. Theresa May
Shadow Secretary of State for Culture, Media and Sport	Hugo Swire
Shadow Secretary of State for Wales	Cheryl Gillan
Shadow Secretary of State for International Development	Andrew Mitchell
Shadow Secretary of State for Trade and Industry & Shadow President of the Board of Trade	Alan Duncan
Shadow Chief Secretary to the Treasury	Theresa Villiers
Shadow Secretary of State for Scotland	David Mundell
Shadow Secretary of State for Northern Ireland	David Lidington
Opposition Chief Whip	The Rt Hon. Patrick McLoughlin
Leader of the Opposition in the House of Lords	The Rt Hon. Thomas Galbraith, Lord Strathclyde PC
Also attending the Shadow Cabinet
Opposition Chief Whip in the House of Lords	The Rt Hon. John Cope, Lord Cope of Berkeley
Shadow Minister for Women and Equality	Eleanor Laing
Shadow Minister for Europe	Graham Brady
Chairman of the Conservative Policy Review; Chairman of the Conservative Research Department; Shadow Minister without Portfolio	The Rt Hon. Oliver Letwin
Leader of the Scottish Conservative Party	Annabel Goldie MSP

== Shadow Cabinet (2 July 2007 – 13 June 2008) ==
Portfolio	Shadow Minister
Leader of the Conservative Party; Leader of Her Majesty's Most Loyal Opposition	The Rt Hon. David Cameron
Shadow Foreign Secretary; Senior Member of the Shadow Cabinet	The Rt Hon. William Hague
Shadow Chancellor of the Exchequer; General Election Campaign Co-ordinator	George Osborne
Shadow Home Secretary	David Davis
Chairman of the Conservative Party	Caroline Spelman
Shadow Secretary of State for Justice	Nick Herbert
Shadow Secretary of State for Health	Andrew Lansley CBE
Shadow Secretary of State for Communities and Local Government	Eric Pickles
Shadow Secretary of State for Children, Schools and Families	Michael Gove
Shadow Secretary of State for Defence	Dr. Liam Fox
Shadow Secretary of State for Environment, Food and Rural Affairs	Peter Ainsworth
Shadow Secretary of State for Work and Pensions	Chris Grayling
Shadow Secretary of State for Transport	Theresa Villiers
Shadow Leader of the House of Commons; Shadow Minister for Women and Equality	The Rt Hon. Theresa May
Shadow Secretary of State for Culture, Media and Sport	Jeremy Hunt
Shadow Secretary of State for Wales	Cheryl Gillan
Shadow Minister for the Cabinet Office; Shadow Chancellor of the Duchy of Lancaster	The Rt Hon. Francis Maude
Shadow Secretary of State for International Development	Andrew Mitchell
Shadow Secretary of State for Business, Enterprise and Regulatory Reform	Alan Duncan
Shadow Chief Secretary to the Treasury	Philip Hammond
Shadow Secretary of State for Innovation, Universities and Skills	David Willetts
Shadow Secretary of State for Scotland	David Mundell
Shadow Secretary of State for Northern Ireland	Owen Paterson
Opposition Chief Whip	The Rt Hon. Patrick McLoughlin
Leader of the Opposition in the House of Lords	The Rt Hon. Thomas Galbraith, Lord Strathclyde PC
Also attending the Shadow Cabinet
Opposition Chief Whip in the House of Lords	The Rt Hon. Joyce Anelay, Baroness Anelay of St Johns DBE PC
Shadow Minister for Europe	Mark Francois
Shadow Foreign Office Minister	David Lidington
Shadow Minister for Housing and Planning	Grant Shapps
Shadow Minister for Science and Innovation	Adam Afriyie
Shadow Minister for Community Cohesion and Social Action	The Rt Hon. Sayeeda Warsi, Baroness Warsi
Shadow Minister for Security; National Security Adviser to the Leader of the Opposition	The Rt Hon. Pauline Neville-Jones, Baroness Neville-Jones DCMG PC
Chairman of the Conservative Policy Review; Chairman of the Conservative Research Department; Shadow Minister without Portfolio	The Rt Hon. Oliver Letwin
Leader of the Scottish Conservative Party	Annabel Goldie MSP

Changes

- Caroline Spelman replaced Francis Maude as Chairman of the Conservative Party
- Nick Herbert replaced Oliver Heald as Shadow Secretary of State for Justice
- Eric Pickles replaced Spelman as Shadow Secretary of State for Communities and Local Government
- Michael Gove replaced David Willetts as Shadow Secretary of State for Children, Schools and Families
- Chris Grayling replaced Philip Hammond as Shadow Secretary of State for Transport
- Theresa May replaced Eleanor Laing as Shadow Minister for Women and Equality while remaining Shadow Leader of the House of Commons
- Jeremy Hunt replaced Hugo Swire as Shadow Secretary of State for Culture, Media and Sport
- Francis Maude gained new portfolios of Shadow Minister for the Cabinet Office and Shadow Chancellor of the Duchy of Lancaster
- Philip Hammond replaced Theresa Villiers as Shadow Chief Secretary to the Treasury
- David Willetts gained the new portfolio of Shadow Secretary of State for Innovation, Universities and Skills
- Owen Paterson replaced David Lidington as Shadow Secretary of State for Northern Ireland
- Joyce Anelay replaced John Cope as Opposition Chief Whip in the House of Lords
- Mark Francois replaced Graham Brady as Shadow Minister for Europe

== Shadow Cabinet (13 June 2008 – 19 January 2009) ==
Portfolio	Shadow Minister
Leader of the Conservative Party; Leader of Her Majesty's Most Loyal Opposition	The Rt Hon. David Cameron
Shadow Foreign Secretary; Senior Member of the Shadow Cabinet	The Rt Hon. William Hague
Shadow Chancellor of the Exchequer; General Election Campaign Co-ordinator	George Osborne
Shadow Home Secretary	Dominic Grieve QC
Chairman of the Conservative Party	Caroline Spelman
Shadow Secretary of State for Justice	Nick Herbert
Shadow Secretary of State for Health	Andrew Lansley CBE
Shadow Secretary of State for Communities and Local Government	Eric Pickles
Shadow Secretary of State for Children, Schools and Families	Michael Gove
Shadow Secretary of State for Defence	Dr. Liam Fox
Shadow Secretary of State for Environment, Food and Rural Affairs	Peter Ainsworth
Shadow Secretary of State for Work and Pensions	Chris Grayling
Shadow Secretary of State for Transport	Theresa Villiers
Shadow Leader of the House of Commons; Shadow Minister for Women and Equality	The Rt Hon. Theresa May
Shadow Secretary of State for Culture, Media and Sport	Jeremy Hunt
Shadow Secretary of State for Wales	Cheryl Gillan
Shadow Minister for the Cabinet Office; Shadow Chancellor of the Duchy of Lancaster	The Rt Hon. Francis Maude
Shadow Secretary of State for International Development	Andrew Mitchell
Shadow Secretary of State for Business, Enterprise and Regulatory Reform	Alan Duncan
Shadow Chief Secretary to the Treasury	Philip Hammond
Shadow Secretary of State for Innovation, Universities and Skills	David Willetts
Shadow Secretary of State for Scotland	David Mundell
Shadow Secretary of State for Northern Ireland	Owen Paterson
Opposition Chief Whip	The Rt Hon. Patrick McLoughlin
Leader of the Opposition in the House of Lords	The Rt Hon. Thomas Galbraith, Lord Strathclyde PC
Also attending the Shadow Cabinet
Opposition Chief Whip in the House of Lords	The Rt Hon. Joyce Anelay, Baroness Anelay of St Johns DBE PC
Shadow Minister for Europe	Mark Francois
Shadow Foreign Office Minister	David Lidington
Shadow Minister for Housing and Planning	Grant Shapps
Shadow Minister for Science and Innovation	Adam Afriyie
Shadow Minister for Community Cohesion and Social Action	The Rt Hon. Sayeeda Warsi, Baroness Warsi
Shadow Minister for Security; National Security Adviser to the Leader of the Opposition	The Rt Hon. Pauline Neville-Jones, Baroness Neville-Jones DCMG PC
Chairman of the Conservative Policy Review; Chairman of the Conservative Research Department; Shadow Minister without Portfolio	The Rt Hon. Oliver Letwin
Leader of the Scottish Conservative Party	Annabel Goldie MSP

Changes

- David Davis resigned as an MP to run for re-election and was replaced as Shadow Home Secretary by Dominic Grieve

== Shadow Cabinet (19 January 2009 – 11 May 2010) ==
Portfolio	Shadow Minister
Leader of the Conservative Party; Leader of Her Majesty's Most Loyal Opposition	The Rt Hon. David Cameron
Shadow Foreign Secretary; Senior Member of the Shadow Cabinet	The Rt Hon. William Hague
Shadow Chancellor of the Exchequer; General Election Campaign Co-ordinator	George Osborne
Shadow Home Secretary	Chris Grayling
Chairman of the Conservative Party	Eric Pickles
Shadow Secretary of State for Justice	Dominic Grieve QC
Shadow Secretary of State for Health	Andrew Lansley CBE
Shadow Secretary of State for Communities and Local Government	Caroline Spelman
Shadow Secretary of State for Children, Schools and Families	Michael Gove
Shadow Secretary of State for Defence	Dr. Liam Fox
Shadow Secretary of State for Environment, Food and Rural Affairs	Nick Herbert
Shadow Secretary of State for Work and Pensions; Shadow Minister for Women and Equality	The Rt Hon. Theresa May
Shadow Secretary of State for Energy and Climate Change	Greg Clark
Shadow Secretary of State for Transport	Theresa Villiers
Shadow Leader of the House of Commons	The Rt Hon. Sir George Young Bt.
Shadow Secretary of State for Culture, Media and Sport	Jeremy Hunt
Shadow Secretary of State for Wales	Cheryl Gillan
Shadow Minister for the Cabinet Office; Shadow Chancellor of the Duchy of Lancaster	The Rt Hon. Francis Maude
Shadow Secretary of State for International Development	Andrew Mitchell
Shadow Secretary of State for Business, Innovation and Skills	The Rt Hon. Kenneth Clarke QC
Shadow Chief Secretary to the Treasury	Philip Hammond
Shadow Minister for Universities and Skills	David Willetts
Shadow Secretary of State for Housing	Grant Shapps
Shadow Secretary of State for Scotland	David Mundell
Shadow Secretary of State for Northern Ireland	Owen Paterson
Shadow Minister for Europe	Mark Francois
Opposition Chief Whip	The Rt Hon. Patrick McLoughlin
Leader of the Opposition in the House of Lords	The Rt Hon. Thomas Galbraith, Lord Strathclyde PC
Also attending the Shadow Cabinet
Opposition Chief Whip in the House of Lords	The Rt Hon. Joyce Anelay, Baroness Anelay of St Johns DBE PC
Shadow Minister for Science and Innovation	Adam Afriyie
Shadow Minister for Community Cohesion and Social Action	The Rt Hon. Sayeeda Warsi, Baroness Warsi
Shadow Minister for Security; National Security Adviser to the Leader of the Opposition	The Rt Hon. Pauline Neville-Jones, Baroness Neville-Jones DCMG PC
Chairman of the Conservative Policy Review; Chairman of the Conservative Research Department; Shadow Minister without Portfolio	The Rt Hon. Oliver Letwin
Leader of the Scottish Conservative Party	Annabel Goldie MSP

Changes

- Chris Grayling replaced Dominic Grieve as Shadow Home Secretary
- Eric Pickles replaced Caroline Spelman as Chairman of the Conservative Party
- Spelman replaced Pickles as Shadow Secretary of State for Communities and Local Government
- Dominic Grieve replaced Nick Herbert as Shadow Secretary of State for Justice
- Nick Herbert replaced Peter Ainsworth as Shadow Secretary of State for Environment, Food and Rural Affairs
- Theresa May replaced Chris Grayling as Shadow Secretary of State for Work and Pensions while remaining Shadow Minister for Women and Equality
- Greg Clark gained a new portfolio of Shadow Secretary of State for Energy and Climate Change
- George Young replaced Theresa May as Shadow Leader of the House of Commons
- Kenneth Clarke replaced Alan Duncan as Shadow Secretary of State for Business, Innovation and Skills
