= Shadow Secretary of State for Education =

Shadow Cabinet office

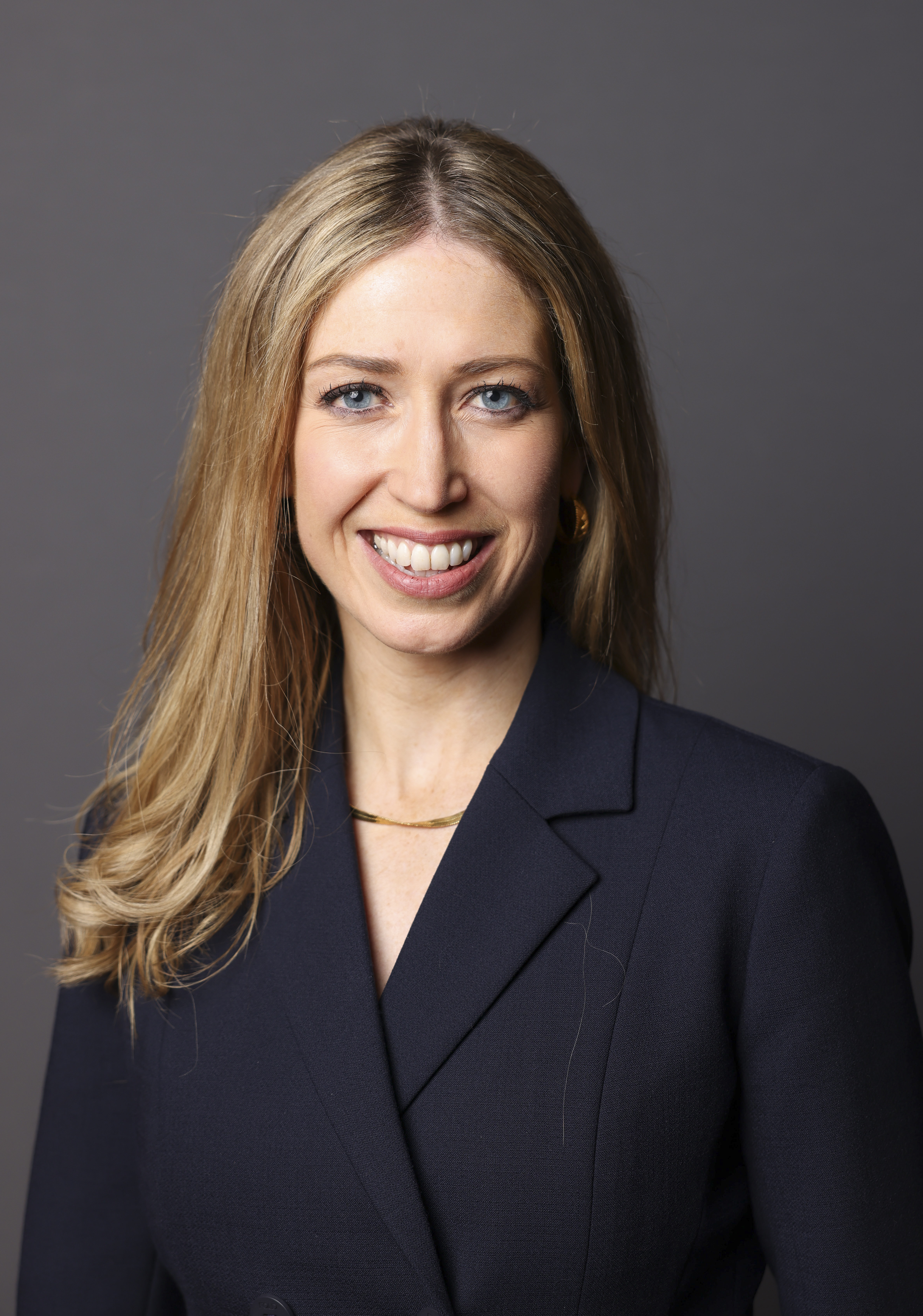
- Incumbent; Laura Trott since 4 November 2024
- Appointer: Leader of the Opposition
- Website: His Majesty's Official Opposition: The Shadow Cabinet

The shadow secretary of state for education, also called the shadow education secretary, is an office in the Official Opposition Shadow Cabinet responsible for Opposition policy on education and for holding the secretary of state for education, junior education ministers, and the Department for Education to account.

== Departments shadowed ==
- Ministry of Education (1944–1964)
- Department of Education and Science (1964–1992)
- Department for Education (1992–1995, 2010–present)
- Department for Education and Employment (1995–2001)
- Department for Education and Skills (2001–2007)
- Department for Children, Schools and Families (2007–2010)

== List of shadow secretaries of state ==
=== Shadow Minister of Education ===
Shadow Secretary	Took office	Left office	Political party	Shadow Cabinet
Michael Stewart	15 July 1955	16 November 1959	Labour	Attlee
Michael Stewart	15 July 1955	16 November 1959	Labour	Gaitskell
Tony Greenwood	16 November 1959	14 October 1960	Labour	Gaitskell
Eirene White	14 October 1960	28 November 1960	Labour	Gaitskell
Fred Willey	28 November 1960	1 April 1964	Labour	Gaitskell
Fred Willey	28 November 1960	1 April 1964	Labour	Wilson
=== Shadow Secretary of State for Education and Science ===
Shadow Secretary	Took office	Left office	Political party	Shadow Cabinet
Fred Willey	1 April 1964	16 October 1964	Labour	Wilson
Quintin Hogg	16 October 1964	16 February 1965	Conservative	Douglas-Home
Sir Edward Boyle	16 February 1965	15 October 1969	Conservative	Douglas-Home
Sir Edward Boyle	16 February 1965	15 October 1969	Conservative	Heath
Margaret Thatcher	21 October 1969	20 June 1970	Conservative	Heath
Edward Short	20 June 1970	6 December 1972	Labour	Wilson II
Roy Hattersley	6 December 1972	5 March 1974	Labour	Wilson II
William van Straubenzee	12 March 1974	12 June 1974	Conservative	Heath II
Norman St John-Stevas	12 June 1974	6 November 1978	Conservative	Heath II
Norman St John-Stevas	12 June 1974	6 November 1978	Conservative	Thatcher
Mark Carlisle	6 November 1978	4 May 1979	Conservative	Thatcher
Gordon Oakes (Note: Secretary of State for Education and Science Shirley Williams lost her seat in the General Election.)	4 May 1979	14 July 1979	Labour	Callaghan
Neil Kinnock	14 July 1979	2 October 1983	Labour	Callaghan
Neil Kinnock	14 July 1979	2 October 1983	Labour	Foot
Giles Radice	2 October 1983	13 July 1987	Labour	Kinnock
Jack Straw	13 July 1987	18 July 1992	Labour	Kinnock
=== Shadow Secretary of State for Education ===
Shadow Secretary	Took office	Left office	Political party	Shadow Cabinet
Ann Taylor	18 July 1992	20 October 1994	Labour	Smith
Ann Taylor	18 July 1992	20 October 1994	Labour	Beckett
David Blunkett	20 October 1994	19 October 1995	Labour	Blair
=== Shadow Secretary of State for Education and Employment ===
Shadow Secretary	Took office	Left office	Political Party	Shadow Cabinet
David Blunkett	19 October 1995	2 May 1997	Labour	Blair
Gillian Shephard	2 May 1997	11 June 1997	Conservative	Major
Stephen Dorrell	11 June 1997	15 June 1998	Conservative	Hague
David Willetts	1 June 1998	15 June 1999	Conservative	Hague
Theresa May	15 June 1999	18 September 2001	Conservative	Hague
=== Shadow Secretary of State for Education and Skills ===
Shadow Secretary	Took office	Left office	Political party	Shadow Cabinet
Damian Green	18 September 2001	11 November 2003	Conservative	Duncan Smith
Tim Yeo	11 November 2003	14 July 2004	Conservative	Howard
Tim Collins	14 July 2004	5 May 2005	Conservative	Howard
David Cameron	10 May 2005	6 December 2005	Conservative	Howard
David Willetts	8 December 2005	3 July 2007	Conservative	Cameron
=== Shadow Secretary of State for Children, Schools and Families ===
Shadow Secretary	Took office	Left office	Political party	Shadow Cabinet
Michael Gove	3 July 2007	11 May 2010	Conservative	Cameron
=== Shadow Secretary of State for Education ===
Shadow Secretary	Took office	Left office	Political party	Shadow Cabinet
Ed Balls	12 May 2010	8 October 2010	Labour	Harman
Andy Burnham	8 October 2010	7 October 2011	Labour	Miliband
Stephen Twigg	7 October 2011	7 October 2013	Labour	Miliband
Tristram Hunt	7 October 2013	14 September 2015	Labour	Miliband
Tristram Hunt	7 October 2013	14 September 2015	Labour	Harman II
Lucy Powell	14 September 2015	26 June 2016	Labour	Corbyn
Pat Glass	27 June 2016	29 June 2016	Labour	Corbyn
Angela Rayner	1 July 2016	5 April 2020	Labour	Corbyn
Rebecca Long-Bailey	6 April 2020	25 June 2020	Labour	Starmer
Kate Green	27 June 2020	29 November 2021	Labour	Starmer
Bridget Phillipson	29 November 2021	5 July 2024	Labour	Starmer
Damian Hinds	8 July 2024	4 November 2024	Conservative	Sunak
Laura Trott	4 November 2024	Incumbent	Conservative	Badenoch

== See also ==
- Official Opposition frontbench
