= Tessa Jowell =

British Labour politician (1947–2018)

The Right Honourable The Baroness Jowell DBE PC
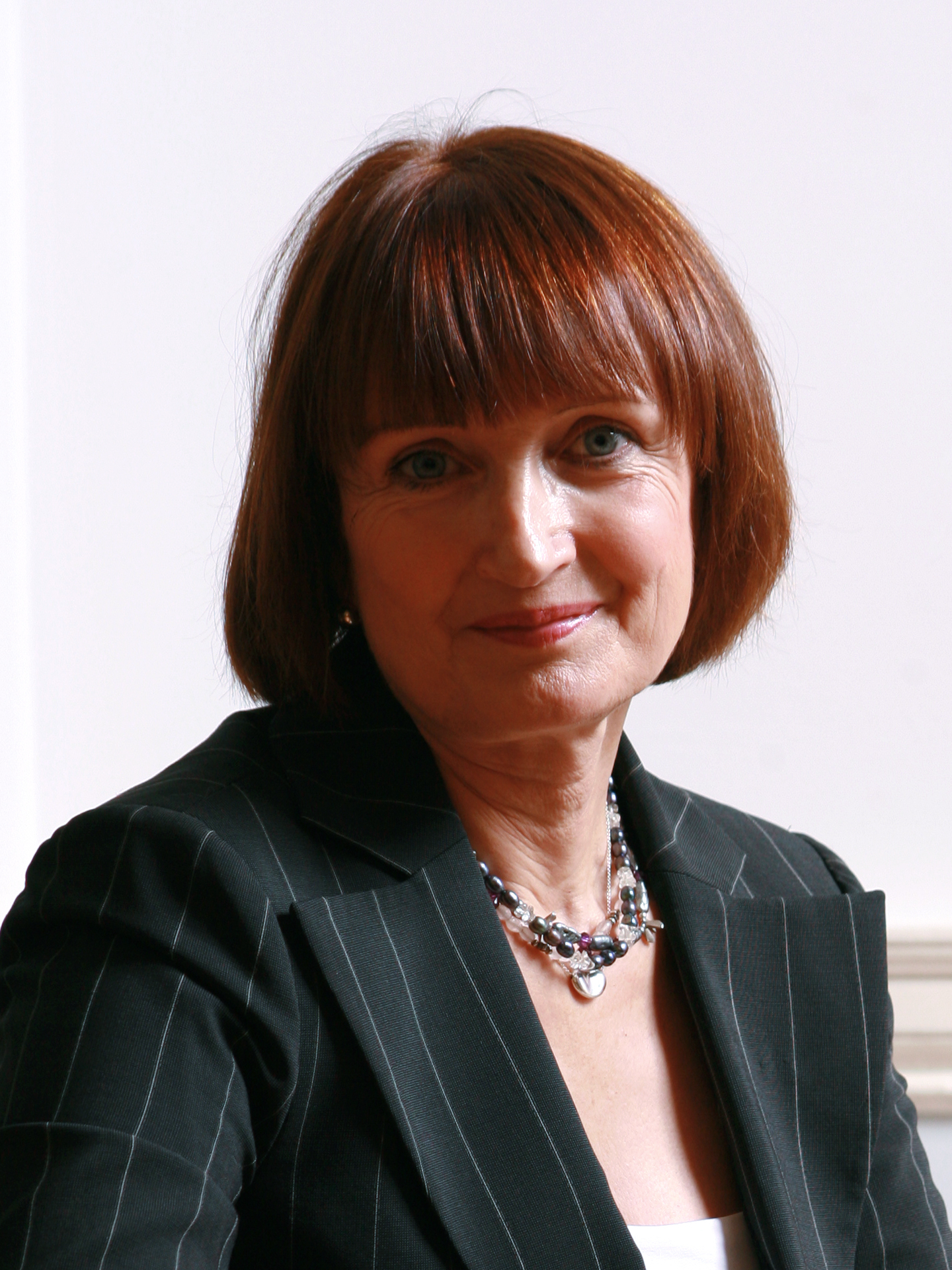
- Official portrait, 2007

Minister for the Cabinet Office
- In office 5 June 2009 – 11 May 2010
- Prime Minister: Gordon Brown
- Preceded by: Liam Byrne
- Succeeded by: Francis Maude

Secretary of State for Culture, Media and Sport
- In office 8 June 2001 – 28 June 2007
- Prime Minister: Tony Blair
- Preceded by: Chris Smith
- Succeeded by: James Purnell
Shadow portfolios
Shadow Minister for the Cabinet Office
In office 20 January 2011 – 7 October 2011
Leader	Ed Miliband
Preceded by	Liam Byrne
Succeeded by	Jon Trickett
In office 11 May 2010 – 8 October 2010
Leader	Harriet Harman (acting)
Preceded by	Francis Maude
Succeeded by	Liam Byrne
Shadow Minister for London
In office 11 May 2010 – 16 January 2013
Leader	Harriet Harman (acting); Ed Miliband
Preceded by	Office established
Succeeded by	Sadiq Khan
Shadow Minister for the Olympics
In office 11 May 2010 – 11 September 2012
Leader	Harriet Harman (acting); Ed Miliband
Preceded by	Jeremy Hunt
Succeeded by	Office abolished
Shadow Minister for Women
In office 19 October 1995 – 26 July 1996
Leader	Tony Blair
Preceded by	Clare Short
Succeeded by	Janet Anderson
Junior ministerial offices
Minister for London
In office 5 June 2009 – 11 May 2010
Prime Minister	Gordon Brown
Preceded by	Tony McNulty
Succeeded by	Gavin Barwell (2016)
In office 28 June 2007 – 3 October 2008
Prime Minister	Gordon Brown
Preceded by	Jim Fitzpatrick
Succeeded by	Tony McNulty
Paymaster General
In office 28 June 2007 – 11 May 2010
Prime Minister	Gordon Brown
Preceded by	Dawn Primarolo
Succeeded by	Francis Maude
Minister for the Olympics
In office 6 July 2005 – 11 May 2010
Prime Minister	Tony Blair; Gordon Brown
Preceded by	Office established
Succeeded by	Jeremy Hunt
Minister for Women
In office 5 May 2005 – 5 May 2006
Prime Minister	Tony Blair
Preceded by	Patricia Hewitt
Succeeded by	Ruth Kelly
Parliamentary offices
Member of the House of Lords
Lord Temporal
Life peerage 27 October 2015 – 12 May 2018
Member of Parliament for Dulwich and West Norwood Dulwich (1992–1997)
In office 9 April 1992 – 30 March 2015
Preceded by	Gerald Bowden
Succeeded by	Helen Hayes

Personal details
- Born: Tessa Jane Helen Douglas Palmer; 17 September 1947 Marylebone, London, England
- Died: 12 May 2018 (aged 70) Darlingscott, Warwickshire, England
- Party: Labour
- Spouses: Roger Jowell (m. 1970; div. 1977); David Mills (m. 1979)
- Children: 2, including Jess Mills
- Relatives: Ella Woodward (daughter-in-law)
- Education: University of Aberdeen; University of Edinburgh; University of London

Tessa Jane Helen Douglas Jowell, Baroness Jowell (née Palmer; 17 September 1947 – 12 May 2018), was a British Labour Party politician and life peer who served as the Member of Parliament (MP) for Dulwich, from 1992 to 1997, followed by Dulwich and West Norwood, from 1997 to 2015.

Jowell held a number of major government ministerial positions, as well as opposition appointments, during this period. She served as Secretary of State for Culture, Media and Sport from 2001 to 2007 and Minister for the Cabinet Office from 2009 to 2010. A member of both the Blair and Brown Cabinets, she was also Minister for the Olympics (2005–2010) and Shadow Minister for the Olympics and Shadow Minister for London until September 2012, resigning after the London Olympic Games.

A Privy Counsellor from 1998, Jowell was appointed Dame Commander of the Order of the British Empire (DBE) in 2012. She stood down from the House of Commons at the 2015 UK general election. She was nominated for a life peerage in the 2015 Dissolution Honours and was raised to the peerage as Baroness Jowell, of Brixton in the London Borough of Lambeth, on 27 October 2015. In September 2015, she was unsuccessful in seeking to be selected as the Labour Party's official candidate in the 2016 London mayoral election, coming second to Sadiq Khan in the contest of six candidates.

== Early life ==
Tessa Jane Helen Douglas Palmer was born at Middlesex Hospital, in Marylebone, London, to Kenneth Nelson Veysey Palmer, a physician, and his wife, Rosemary (née Douglas), a radiographer. She was educated at the independent St Margaret's School for Girls in Aberdeen, the University of Aberdeen (where she studied arts, psychology and sociology) and the University of Edinburgh (where she studied for an MA in Social Administration). She became a social worker, initially working in the Craigmillar area of Edinburgh and as a childcare officer in Lambeth, before training at Goldsmiths College as a psychiatric social worker. She subsequently worked at the Maudsley Hospital, and later became assistant director of the mental health charity Mind.

During this time, Jowell took her first steps into electoral politics, being elected to represent Swiss Cottage on Camden London Borough Council in the early 1970s, and becoming Chair of the Camden Borough Council's Social Services Committee at the age of 25. She was the Labour Party candidate in the 1978 Ilford North by-election but lost Labour's majority to the Conservative Party. She stood again in Ilford North at the 1979 UK general election, also unsuccessfully.

== Member of Parliament ==
Elected as MP for Dulwich at the 1992 UK general election, Jowell was successively appointed as an Opposition Spokesperson on Health, an Opposition Whip and Spokesperson on Women, before returning to the Shadow Health team in 1996. following boundary changes, she was the MP for Dulwich and West Norwood from 1997.

=== In government ===
Jowell was appointed as Minister of State in the Department of Health following Labour's landslide victory in the 1997 UK general election. As the first Minister for Public Health, she championed cross-sectoral action to improve health and reduce inequalities, initially set out in her green paper "Our Healthier Nation". She moved, again as Minister of State, to the Department for Education and Employment in 1999.

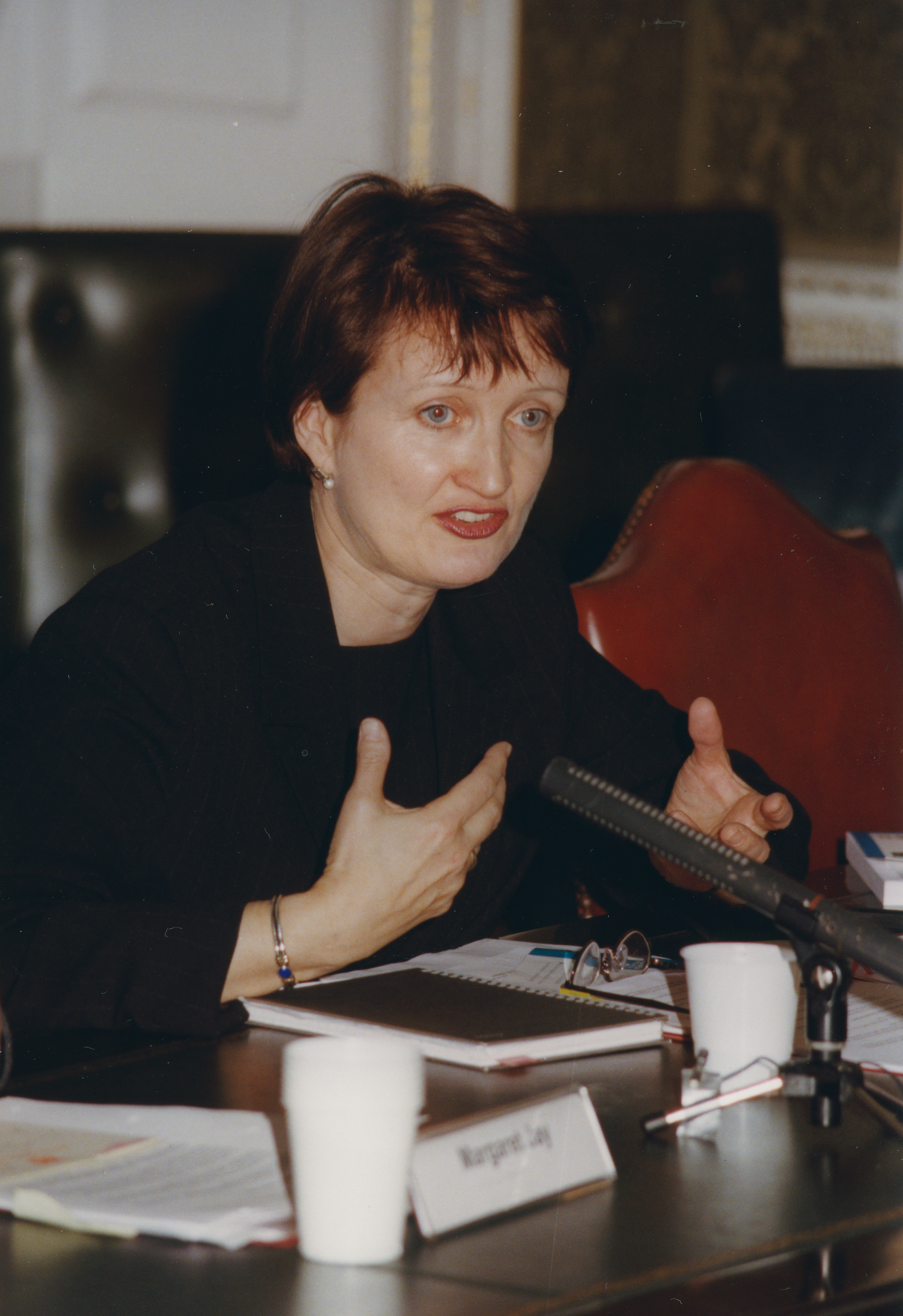
Jowell in 2000

Jowell was appointed Secretary of State at the Department for Culture, Media and Sport following the 2001 UK general election, replacing the sacked Chris Smith. One of her main concerns as Culture Secretary was television broadcasting. She blocked the BBC's plans for the digital channel BBC Three, on the grounds that they were insufficiently different from commercial offerings, and imposed extra conditions on BBC News 24 after it was criticized on the same grounds by the Lambert Report. She was responsible for the Communications Act 2003 which established a new media regulator, Ofcom. It also relaxed regulations on ownership of British television stations, though, following a rebellion in the House of Lords, a 'public interest' test was introduced as a compromise.

In July 2003, Jowell launched an overhaul of the National Lottery. She dealt with complaints that the lottery had been directed to fund programmes that should have been covered by mainstream taxation. In 2001 Arts Council England announced changes to how funding would be distributed and she supported this. She oversaw the restructuring of the Arts funding system but lost out in the 2004/5 spending round, when there was a cut in her departmental budget. In 2004 a tax loophole was closed around film production in Britain.

In 2004, Jowell faced resistance to proposals for a series of so-called "super casinos", to be sanctioned as part of the Gambling Act 2005 which liberalised Britain's gaming laws. Although some argued that problem gambling had ruined the lives of many ordinary people, in the run up to the Bill, Jowell dismissed much of the criticism as being elitist, commenting that "opponents of the Government's gambling reforms are snobs who want to deny ordinary people the right to bet". Former Labour Welfare Minister Frank Field said her comments were crass, declaring, "I think this whole New Labour line that you insult people rather than engage in argument is deeply disturbing".

In March 2005, Jowell announced a new governance system for the BBC: the BBC Trust, to replace the long-established Board of Governors. The trust was introduced in 2007 but in 2012 was shown to be 'not fit for purpose', leading to the resignation of the Director General. In Gordon Brown's reshuffle in June 2007, following his succession as Labour leader and Prime Minister, Jowell was demoted from her position as Secretary of State for Culture, Media and Sport. She retained her Olympics portfolio, however, and was also appointed Paymaster General and Minister for London, being allowed to attend Cabinet, although not as a full member.

Jowell was further demoted on 3 October 2008, losing her Minister for London role to Tony McNulty, and being allowed to attend cabinet only when her area of responsibility was on the agenda. In his 2009 reshuffle, Brown reappointed her to the Cabinet as Minister for the Cabinet Office. In the 2012 Birthday Honours, Jowell was appointed Dame Commander of the Order of the British Empire (DBE) for "political and charitable services", in particular for her contribution to delivering the London 2012 Olympics.

=== Political positions ===
Jowell was a zealous supporter of the then Prime Minister Tony Blair, reportedly saying on one occasion that she would "jump under a bus" for him. She was very supportive of New Labour and was fully loyal to its agenda, earning herself a strong reputation as a Blairite. In 2007, she supported Hazel Blears for the deputy leadership of the Labour Party. In 2009, she was mentioned as a possible Cabinet minister who might resign over the leadership of Gordon Brown in order to trigger a leadership contest – a suggestion which proved unfounded. In opposition, Jowell supported David Miliband's campaign to become Leader of the Labour Party, but served in Ed Miliband's Shadow Cabinet when he became Leader of HM Opposition. In 2010 she briefly appeared as a landmark on Google Maps, as a result of a prank.

Jowell was involved in the Blue Labour movement in the Labour Party, and was a contributor to The Purple Book, drawing on her background on the right of the Labour Party. Jowell set up the Sure Start programme, Jowell said, "I am very proud of setting up Sure Start [the national nurture and childcare programme], because the first three years of a child's life are absolutely critical in determining the chances they have subsequently."

=== London 2012 Olympics ===
Jowell was in charge of London's successful bid to host the 2012 Olympics. She came up with the idea in 2002, during her time as Culture Secretary, when she said there was very little support from within the Cabinet, with many colleagues thinking that Paris' bid would win. Jowell convinced the Government to support the bid, however, and went ahead with it. In 2004, she launched the bid and, when the Games were awarded to London, she was appointed Olympics Minister (in addition to her responsibilities as Culture Secretary), and held full ministerial responsibility for the bid from 2006. Despite being moved from the Department for Culture, Media and Sport in 2007, she retained her position as Olympics Minister throughout Labour's time in office.

Following the general election of May 2010, at which Labour lost power, Jowell became Shadow Olympics Minister. She remained on the 2012 Olympics Organising Committee, with Lord Coe and Jeremy Hunt. She was appointed deputy mayor of the Olympic Village, being responsible for making the Olympics take place. She resigned her role as Shadow Minister for the Olympics in September 2012, and returned to the House of Commons backbenches.

== After the House of Commons ==
In November 2013, Jowell announced that she would not contest the next general election. In May 2015, she launched her campaign to be selected as the Labour Party's official candidate in the 2016 London mayoral election. Six candidates stood for selection and in September the process concluded with her coming second to Sadiq Khan.

Jowell was nominated for life peerage in the 2015 Dissolution Honours by the Labour leader. She was raised to the peerage as Baroness Jowell, of Brixton, in the London Borough of Lambeth, on 27 October 2015. In January 2018, Jowell got a standing ovation in the House of Lords for a speech. She began by speaking of how she came to be diagnosed with an extremely lethal form of brain cancer called glioblastoma multiforme. She went on to advocate making more cancer treatments available in the NHS. She said, "In the end, what gives a life meaning is not only how it is lived, but how it draws to a close. I hope that this debate will give hope to other cancer patients, like me, so that we can live well together with cancer, not just dying of it. All of us, for longer."

== Controversies ==
=== Jowell, Mills and Berlusconi ===
Jowell's husband David Mills was an international corporate lawyer who has acted for Silvio Berlusconi, then the Italian Prime Minister. Mills was investigated in Italy for money laundering and alleged tax fraud. Jowell was investigated by the Cabinet Secretary Gus O'Donnell over the allegations surrounding her husband, because of a possible conflict of interest between her personal life and ministerial duties. O'Donnell stated that, "it is the Prime Minister, not me, who, constitutionally, is the right and proper person to take a view on matters arising based on the Ministerial Code" in his letter, and Tony Blair decided that she was "not in breach" of the ministers' code of conduct.

On 4 March 2006, it was announced that Jowell and Mills had separated, after the allegations had begun to damage her political standing. Jowell said "although we are separated I have never doubted his innocence". Scepticism that Jowell was unaware of the details of her husband's dealings with Berlusconi led to a Private Eye front cover of her with a speech bubble saying: "I have never met my husband". Mills allegedly admitted to being "an idiot", and has expressed his remorse about the impact of his dealings upon his wife. The separation had effectively ended by September 2012.

On 17 February 2009, an Italian court sentenced Mills to four years and six months in jail after finding him guilty of accepting a bribe from Berlusconi to give false evidence on his behalf during corruption trials which had taken place in 1997 and 1998. His defence counsel said that the sentence went "against the logic and dynamic of the evidence presented". The judgment was appealed by Mills. On 27 October 2009, the Appeal Court upheld his conviction and prison sentence. Mills confirmed that he would initiate a second and final appeal to the Cassation Court. On 25 February 2010, Italy's Supreme Court of Cassation (the second and last court of appeal under Italian law) dissolved the case because of the statute of limitations. For this type of crime in Italian law, a case expires after 10 years. Mills argued that he received the money in 1999, and not 2000 as prosecutors had previously argued, thus taking advantage of the statute of limitations.

=== Other controversies ===
In 2001, Jowell was widely criticised for 'interfering' in Independent Television Commission (ITC) rulings on complaints regarding Brass Eye. The Guardian newspaper suggested that "for the Culture Secretary to speak directly to the head of a TV network about a specific programme smacks of the Soviet commissar and the state broadcaster". The ITC reminded Jowell that she should not be interfering in their processes, resulting in a Channel Four interviewer suggesting Jowell and her colleagues "must feel like idiots".

In 2006, Jowell was criticised for projected cost over-runs on the London 2012 Summer Olympics project, which came under the supervision of her former department. She was among a number of ministers accused of hypocrisy, on the grounds that she opposed Post Office closures in their own constituencies while supporting the government's closure strategy at the national level. Jowell was Secretary of State for Culture, Media and Sport during the News of the World newspaper phone-hacking scandal (pre-2007). In January 2007, Clive Goodman, the News of the World's royal editor, was jailed for four months, and Glenn Mulcaire, a private investigator employed by the News of the World, was jailed for six months. She is played by Lucy Russell in the 2025 ITV drama about the hacking scandal, The Hack.

In May 2014 a temporary personal assistant to Richard Scudamore, chief executive of England's Premier League, read private emails between Scudamore and colleagues and friends. These included comments about women's football, which the assistant felt to be inappropriate. She passed them on to a national newspaper, the Daily Mirror. Jowell defended the reading and passing-on of the emails, declaring that, "in the world of social media and email, there is no public and private".

== Leadership fellow ==
Jowell served as a Richard L. and Ronay A. Menschel Senior Leadership Fellow at Harvard T.H. Chan School of Public Health in 2016. In this role, she taught a course in the Department of Health Policy and Management called, "Health Policy and Leadership: Why do we know so much and do so little?" Jowell also actively served on the advisory board of the Ministerial Leadership in Health Program, a joint initiative of the Harvard T.H. Chan School of Public Health and the John F. Kennedy School of Government.

== Personal life ==
Jowell's first marriage was to fellow Camden Councillor Roger Jowell in 1970; this was dissolved in 1976, but she continued to use his surname. She married David Mills on 17 March 1979. They separated in March 2006, following the controversy over Mills's links to Silvio Berlusconi. Jowell said on Radio 4's Woman's Hour programme in September 2012 that she was seeing Mills regularly, saying that they had "reached a state of stability which I never thought possible". She had a son and daughter, as well as three stepchildren (including journalist Eleanor Mills) from her husband's first marriage. In April 2016, her son Matthew Mills married food writer Ella Woodward, who is also his business partner. Her daughter Jess Mills is a singer.

In January 2011, during the News of the World phone hacking affair, it was revealed that Jowell had contacted lawyers as she attempted to find out who hacked into her voicemails on 28 separate occasions during 2006. Jowell contacted police in late January 2011 to inform them that there had recently been an unsuccessful attempt to listen to voicemail messages on her phone.

=== Illness and death ===
On 17 September 2017, her family made public the news that she had been suffering from a brain tumour since May of that year. On her Twitter account, she stated "Thank you for so much love and support on my birthday. More people living longer better lives with cancer is my birthday pledge". Jowell wanted more treatment for cancer patients, knowledge about cancer treatment shared more effectively, speedier diagnosis, greater access to experimental treatments, and improved survival rates. On 11 May 2018, Jowell suffered a brain haemorrhage and fell into a coma at her home in Darlingscott, near Shipston-on-Stour, Warwickshire; she died the following day at the age of 70. After Jowell's death, Downing Street announced that in tribute to her, brain cancer government funding would be doubled and the so-called "gold standard dye" tumour diagnosis tests would be extended to all NHS hospitals. In 2020 the Tessa Jowell Brain Cancer Mission (TJBCM) was created in her honour.

== Honours ==
Order of the British Empire (Civil) Ribbon

Coronet of a British Baron

Jowell was sworn of the Privy Council in 1998, giving her the honorific style "The Right Honourable" and, after ennoblement, the post-nominal letters "PC" for life. Jowell was appointed to the Order of the British Empire as a Dame Commander in the Civil Division in the 2012 Birthday Honours, giving her the right to the prenomial title "Dame" and post-nominal letters "DBE". Although hers was a substantive and not honorary damehood, the former was no longer practically applicable following her peerage, with its superseding form of address. Jowell was given the Freedom of the Borough of Southwark on 12 May 2012. Jowell was raised to the peerage in the 2015 Dissolution Honours, allowing her to sit in the House of Lords. She sat with the Labour Party benches. She took the title of Baroness Jowell. On 17 June 2016, Jowell was awarded the honorary degree of Doctor of Laws (LL.D) by the University of Aberdeen.

Parliament of the United Kingdom
Preceded by Gerald Bowden	Member of Parliament for Dulwich; 1992–1997	Constituency abolished
New constituency	Member of Parliament for Dulwich and West Norwood; 1997–2015	Succeeded by Helen Hayes
Political offices
Preceded by Clare Short	Shadow Minister for Women; 1995–1996	Succeeded by Janet Anderson
Preceded by Chris Smith	Secretary of State for Culture, Media and Sport; 2001–2007	Succeeded by James Purnell
Preceded by Patricia Hewitt	Minister for Women; 2005–2006	Succeeded by Ruth Kelly
New office	Minister for the Olympics; 2005–2010	Succeeded by Jeremy Hunt
Preceded by Jim Fitzpatrick	Minister for London; 2007–2008	Succeeded by Tony McNulty
Preceded by Dawn Primarolo	Paymaster General; 2007–2010	Succeeded by Francis Maude
Preceded by Liam Byrne	Minister for the Cabinet Office; 2009–2010	Succeeded by Francis Maude
Preceded by Tony McNulty	Minister for London; 2009–2010	Vacant Title next held by Gavin Barwell
Preceded by Francis Maude	Shadow Minister for the Cabinet Office; 2010	Succeeded by Liam Byrne
New office	Shadow Minister for the Olympics; 2010–2012	Position abolished
New office	Shadow Minister for London; 2010–2013	Succeeded by Sadiq Khan
Preceded by Liam Byrne	Shadow Minister for the Cabinet Office; 2011	Succeeded by Jon Trickett
