= Blair shadow cabinet =

Shadow Cabinet of the United Kingdom from 1994 to 1997

Blair Shadow Cabinet
- Shadow Cabinet of the United Kingdom
- 1994 – 1997
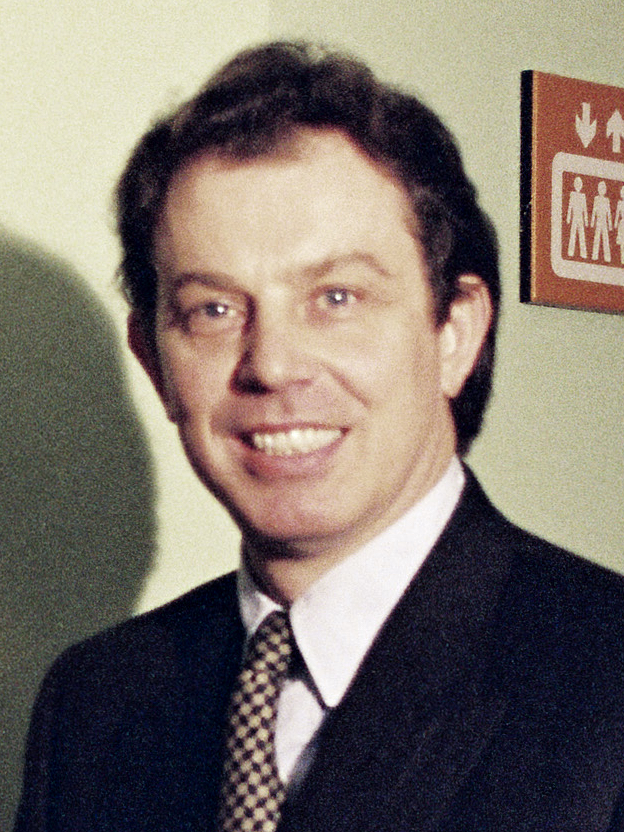
- Blair in 1995
- Date formed: 21 July 1994
- Date dissolved: 2 May 1997

People and organisations
- Monarch: Elizabeth II
- Leader of the Opposition: Tony Blair
- Deputy Leader of the Opposition: John Prescott
- Member party: Labour Party
- Status in legislature: Official Opposition

History
- Election: 1994 Labour Party leadership election
- Outgoing election: 1997 United Kingdom general election
- Legislature terms: 51st UK Parliament
- Predecessor: Beckett shadow cabinet
- Successor: Major shadow cabinet

Tony Blair was Leader of the Labour Party and Leader of the Opposition from his election as Leader on 21 July 1994 until he became Prime Minister on 2 May 1997. Blair became leader upon the death of John Smith.

Blair had three Shadow Cabinets during his tenure as opposition leader. Following his election as leader on 21 July 1994, Blair formed an interim shadow cabinet which remained largely the same as the shadow cabinet of his predecessor John Smith. On 20 October 1994, following the 1994 Shadow Cabinet elections, Blair announced his second Shadow Cabinet. Blair made a number of significant changes to the Shadow Cabinet on 19 October 1995, following the 1995 Shadow Cabinet elections. Small changes were made to the Shadow Cabinet at the 1996 Shadow Cabinet elections.

Blair's tenure as leader began with a historic rebranding of the party, who began to use the campaign label New Labour to distance itself from previous Labour politics and the traditional idea of socialism. Despite opposition from Labour's left-wing, he abolished Clause IV, the party's formal commitment to the nationalisation of the economy, weakened trade union influence in the party, and committed to the free market and the European Union.

Blair inherited the Labour leadership at a time when the party was ascendant over the Conservatives in the opinion polls, since the Conservative government's reputation in monetary policy declined as a result of the Black Wednesday economic disaster of September 1992. Blair's election as leader saw Labour support surge higher still in spite of the continuing economic recovery and fall in unemployment that the Conservative government led by John Major had overseen since the end of the 1990–92 recession.

At the 1996 Labour Party Conference, Blair stated that his three top priorities on coming to office were "education, education, and education". In 1996, the manifesto New Labour, New Life for Britain was published, which set out the party's new "Third Way" centrist approach to policy, and was presented as the brand of a newly reformed party that had altered Clause IV and endorsed market economics. In May 1995, Labour had achieved considerable success in the local and European elections, and had won four by-elections. For Blair, these achievements were a source of optimism, as they indicated that the Conservatives were in decline. Virtually every opinion poll since late-1992 put Labour ahead of the Conservatives with enough support to form an overall majority.

== Shadow Cabinet list ==
Portfolio	Shadow Minister	Term
Leader of Her Majesty's Most Loyal Opposition; Leader of the Labour Party	The Rt Hon. Tony Blair	1994–1997
Deputy Leader of Her Majesty's Most Loyal Opposition; Deputy Leader of the Labour Party	The Rt Hon. John Prescott	1994–1997
Leader of the Opposition in the House of Lords	The Rt Hon. The Lord Richard PC	1994–1997
Labour Chief Whip in the House of Commons	The Rt Hon. Derek Foster	1994–1995
Labour Chief Whip in the House of Commons	Donald Dewar	1995–1997
Labour Chief Whip in the House of Lords	The Lord Graham of Edmonton	1994–1997
Shadow Lord Chancellor	The Lord Irvine of Lairg	1994–1997
Shadow Chancellor of the Exchequer	Gordon Brown	1994–1997
Shadow Foreign Secretary	Robin Cook	1994–1997
Shadow Home Secretary	Jack Straw	1994–1997
Shadow Secretary of State for Defence	David Clark	1994–1997
Shadow Secretary of State for Employment	Harriet Harman	1994–1995
Shadow Secretary of State for Education	David Blunkett	1994–1995
Shadow Secretary of State for Education and Employment	David Blunkett	1995–1997
Shadow Secretary of State for the Environment	Frank Dobson	1994–1997
Shadow Secretary of State for Health	The Rt Hon. Margaret Beckett	1994–1995
Shadow Secretary of State for Health	Harriet Harman	1995–1996
Shadow Secretary of State for Health	Chris Smith	1996–1997
Shadow Leader of the House of Commons	Ann Taylor	1994–1997
Shadow Minister for the Citizen's Charter	Ann Taylor	1994–1995
Shadow Minister for the Citizen's Charter	The Rt Hon. Derek Foster	1995–1997
Shadow Chancellor of the Duchy of Lancaster	The Rt Hon. Derek Foster	1995–1997
Shadow Secretary of State for Social Security	Donald Dewar	1994–1995
Shadow Secretary of State for Social Security	Chris Smith	1995–1996
Shadow Secretary of State for Social Security	Harriet Harman	1996–1997
Shadow Secretary of State for National Heritage; Shadow Minister with special responsibility for the Information Superhighway	Chris Smith	1994–1995
Shadow Secretary of State for National Heritage; Shadow Minister with special responsibility for the Information Superhighway	The Rt Hon. Jack Cunningham	1995–1997
Shadow Secretary of State for Trade and Industry	The Rt Hon. Jack Cunningham	1994–1995
Shadow Secretary of State for Trade and Industry	The Rt Hon. Margaret Beckett	1995–1997
Shadow Secretary of State for Transport	Michael Meacher	1994–1995
Shadow Secretary of State for Transport	Clare Short	1995–1996
Shadow Secretary of State for Transport	Andrew Smith	1996–1997
Shadow Secretary of State for Scotland	George Robertson	1994–1997
Shadow Secretary of State for Wales	Ron Davies	1994–1997
Shadow Secretary of State for Northern Ireland	Mo Mowlam	1994–1997
Shadow Minister for Overseas Development	Joan Lestor	1994–1996
Shadow Minister for Overseas Development	Clare Short	1996–1997
Shadow Minister of Agriculture, Fisheries and Food	Gavin Strang	1994–1997
Shadow Minister for Employment	Michael Meacher	1995–1996
Shadow Minister for Environmental Protection	Michael Meacher	1996–1997

== Initial Shadow Cabinet ==
Following his election as leader in July 1994, Blair formed his first shadow cabinet, which would serve for an interim basis until the 1994 Shadow Cabinet elections later that year. The shadow cabinet remained largely the same as it was under Blair's predecessor John Smith, though Alun Michael was appointed to succeed Blair as shadow home secretary and Ann Clwyd was appointed to serve as shadow secretary of state for employment in the place of newly elected deputy leader John Prescott.

== Second Shadow Cabinet ==
On 20 October 1994, following the 1994 Shadow Cabinet elections, Blair announced his second Shadow Cabinet.

- Tony Blair – Leader of Her Majesty's Most Loyal Opposition and Leader of the Labour Party
- John Prescott – Deputy Leader of Her Majesty's Most Loyal Opposition and Deputy Leader of the Labour Party
- Lord Richard – Leader of the Opposition in the House of Lords
- Derek Foster – Labour Chief Whip in the House of Commons
- Lord Graham of Edmonton – Labour Chief Whip in the House of Lords
- Lord Irvine of Lairg – Shadow Lord Chancellor
- Gordon Brown – Shadow Chancellor of the Exchequer
- Robin Cook – Shadow Foreign Secretary
- Jack Straw – Shadow Home Secretary
- David Clark – Shadow Secretary of State for Defence
- David Blunkett – Shadow Secretary of State for Education
- Harriet Harman – Shadow Secretary of State for Employment
- Frank Dobson – Shadow Secretary of State for the Environment
- Margaret Beckett – Shadow Secretary of State for Health
- Ann Taylor – Shadow Leader of the House of Commons and Shadow Minister for the Citizen's Charter
- Donald Dewar – Shadow Secretary of State for Social Security
- Chris Smith – Shadow Secretary of State for National Heritage and Shadow Minister with special responsibility for the Information Superhighway
- Jack Cunningham – Shadow Secretary of State for Trade and Industry
- Michael Meacher – Shadow Secretary of State for Transport
- George Robertson – Shadow Secretary of State for Scotland
- Ron Davies – Shadow Secretary of State for Wales
- Mo Mowlam – Shadow Secretary of State for Northern Ireland
- Joan Lestor – Shadow Minister for Overseas Development
- Gavin Strang – Shadow Minister of Agriculture, Fisheries and Food

== 1995 reshuffle ==
Blair made a number of significant changes to the Shadow Cabinet on 19 October 1995, following the 1995 Shadow Cabinet elections. Foster, who had been elected to the post, acceded to Blair's request that he step aside as Chief Whip; he was appointed Shadow Chancellor of the Duchy of Lancaster and Shadow Minister responsible for the Citizen's Charter, taking the latter from Taylor, who remained Shadow Leader of the House. Dewar was appointed Chief Whip under a new rule that made the job appointive and added on additional elective seat in the Shadow Cabinet. Chris Smith replaced Dewar at Social Security, and was replaced as Shadow National Heritage Secretary by Cunningham. Responsibility for the Information Superhighway was transferred from Shadow National Heritage Secretary to a junior Shadow Trade and Industry minister (Geoff Hoon). Cunningham was in turn replaced at the Trade and Industry brief by Beckett. Harman took over the Health portfolio Beckett had held. Blunkett added Harman's Employment portfolio to his own to reflect the created of the Department for Education and Employment.

Michael Meacher, while remaining in the Shadow Cabinet, became Blunkett's deputy as Shadow Minister for Employment, leaving the Transport brief to Clare Short, newly elected to the Shadow Cabinet. Another newcomer, Tom Clarke, was appointed to the new post of Shadow Minister for Disabled People's Rights.

- Tony Blair – Leader of Her Majesty's Most Loyal Opposition and Leader of the Labour Party
- John Prescott – Deputy Leader of Her Majesty's Most Loyal Opposition and Deputy Leader of the Labour Party
- Lord Richard – Leader of the Opposition in the House of Lords
- Donald Dewar – Labour Chief Whip in the House of Commons
- Lord Graham of Edmonton – Labour Chief Whip in the House of Lords
- Lord Irvine of Lairg – Shadow Lord Chancellor
- Gordon Brown – Shadow Chancellor of the Exchequer
- Robin Cook – Shadow Foreign Secretary
- Jack Straw – Shadow Home Secretary
- David Clark – Shadow Secretary of State for Defence
- David Blunkett – Shadow Secretary of State for Education and Employment
- Frank Dobson – Shadow Secretary of State for the Environment
- Harriet Harman – Shadow Secretary of State for Health
- Ann Taylor – Shadow Leader of the House of Commons
- Chris Smith – Shadow Secretary of State for Social Security
- Jack Cunningham – Shadow Secretary of State for National Heritage and Shadow Minister with special responsibility for the Information Superhighway
- Margaret Beckett – Shadow Secretary of State for Trade and Industry
- Michael Meacher – Shadow Minister for Employment
- Clare Short – Shadow Secretary of State for Transport
- George Robertson – Shadow Secretary of State for Scotland
- Ron Davies – Shadow Secretary of State for Wales
- Mo Mowlam – Shadow Secretary of State for Northern Ireland
- Joan Lestor – Shadow Minister for Overseas Development
- Gavin Strang – Shadow Minister of Agriculture, Fisheries and Food
- Derek Foster – Shadow Minister for the Citizen's Charter
- Tom Clarke – Shadow Minister for Disabled People's Rights

Changes

- 1 July 1996: Harriet Harman and Chris Smith swap posts.
- 25 July 1996: Joan Lestor stood down at the 1996 Shadow Cabinet election, as she was standing down at the impending general election. She was replaced as Shadow Minister for Overseas Development by Short, who was replaced at Transport by Andrew Smith. Meacher took the new position of Shadow Minister for Environmental Protection (a post separate from Shadow Environment Secretary).

== See also ==
- 1994 Labour Party Shadow Cabinet election
- 1995 Labour Party Shadow Cabinet election
- 1996 Labour Party Shadow Cabinet election
