= 2010 Labour Party Shadow Cabinet election =

Last Labour Party election to the Shadow Cabinet, occurring in 2010

The Commons members of the Parliamentary Labour Party (PLP) elected 19 members of the Shadow Cabinet from among their number in 2010. This follows the Labour Party's defeat at the 2010 general election, after which the party formed the Official Opposition in the United Kingdom.

A separate election for Opposition Chief Whip, an ex officio member of the Shadow Cabinet, happened at the same time. Rosie Winterton was unopposed in that election; she would serve for the remainder of the Parliament. The results of the Shadow Cabinet election were announced on 7 October 2010, hours after the balloting closed.

The PLP voted to abolish Shadow Cabinet elections at a meeting on 5 July 2011, before the National Executive Committee and the Party Conference followed suit. As a result, the 2010 Shadow Cabinet election was the last.

== Background ==
Shadow Cabinet elections typically happened near the beginning of a session, but were delayed until after the leadership election, which ended with the announcement of Ed Miliband as winner on 25 September. Nominations were open from 26 to 29 September, and voting occurred from 4 to 7 October. The leader may choose to assign Shadow Cabinet portfolios to non-members, who are considered to "attend" Shadow Cabinet.

== Rule changes ==
On 8 September 2010, the PLP voted to continue electing the Shadow Cabinet and made various changes to the rules for such elections:

- Shadow Cabinet elections will be held every two years, rather than every year.
- The Chief Whip will once again be separately elected, reversing a change made before the 1995 Shadow Cabinet election that allowed the Leader of the Labour Party to hand out the position as with any other Shadow Cabinet portfolio. Now, the Chief Whip will be elected by the PLP for the duration of a Parliament.
- For a PLP member's ballot to be valid, it must contain votes for at least six women and six men, up from four.
- The Shadow Cabinet will no longer be the Parliamentary Committee when the party is in opposition. Instead, the latter will be a backbench group just as when the party is in government.

== Ex officio members ==
The following are also members of the Shadow Cabinet by virtue of the office listed:

- Leader of the Labour Party (Ed Miliband)
- Deputy Leader (Harriet Harman)
- Opposition Chief Whip in the Commons (Rosie Winterton)
- Leader of the Opposition in the House of Lords (Baroness Royall of Blaisdon)
- Opposition Chief Whip in the Lords (Lord Bassam of Brighton)

== Candidates ==
Shortly after the 2010 general election, Shadow Chancellor of the Exchequer Alistair Darling announced that he would not be a candidate in the elections, thus ending more than 20 years of frontbench service. In August, both Shadow Justice Secretary Jack Straw and Shadow Defence Secretary Bob Ainsworth announced their retirements from the frontbench. On 29 September, the day nominations closed, Shadow Foreign Secretary David Miliband announced he would step down from the Shadow Cabinet, having been defeated for the Labour leadership days earlier by his brother, Ed.

Forty-nine Labour MPs stood for election, and the results were as follows:

Colour key	Retained in the Shadow Cabinet
Colour key	Joined the Shadow Cabinet
Colour key	Voted out of the Shadow Cabinet

Rank	Candidate	Constituency	Votes	Subsequent portfolio
1	Yvette Cooper	Normanton, Pontefract and Castleford	232	Shadow Foreign Secretary
2	John Healey (Note: It is unclear from the sources (see note 2, below) whether Healey was a full Shadow Cabinet member before the election or merely in attendance, in which case he would be listed as joining rather than having been retained in the Shadow Cabinet.)	Wentworth and Dearne	192	Shadow Secretary of State for Health
3	Ed Balls	Morley and Outwood	179	Shadow Home Secretary
4†	Andy Burnham	Leigh	165	Shadow Secretary of State for Education; Election Co-ordinator
4†	Angela Eagle	Wallasey	165	Shadow Chief Secretary to the Treasury
6	Alan Johnson	Kingston upon Hull West and Hessle	163	Shadow Chancellor of the Exchequer
7†	Douglas Alexander	Paisley and Renfrewshire South	160	Shadow Secretary of State for Work and Pensions
7†	Jim Murphy	East Renfrewshire	160	Shadow Secretary of State for Defence
9	Tessa Jowell	Dulwich and West Norwood	152	Shadow Minister for the Olympics
10	Caroline Flint	Don Valley	139	Shadow Secretary of State for Communities and Local Government
11	John Denham	Southampton Itchen	129	Shadow Secretary of State for Business, Innovation and Skills
12†	Hilary Benn	Leeds Central	128	Shadow Leader of the House of Commons
12†	Sadiq Khan (Note: Khan was listed on the Labour Party's and Parliament's frontbench lists as attending Shadow Cabinet rather than as a full member. The Shadow Cabinet list at Labour's website, produced earlier than the others, makes no distinction between full members and attendees.)	Tooting	128	Shadow Secretary of State for Justice; Shadow Lord Chancellor
14	Mary Creagh	Wakefield	119	Shadow Secretary of State for Environment, Food and Rural Affairs
15	Ann McKechin	Glasgow North	117	Shadow Secretary of State for Scotland
16	Maria Eagle	Garston and Halewood	107	Shadow Secretary of State for Transport
17	Meg Hillier	Hackney South and Shoreditch	106	Shadow Secretary of State for Energy and Climate Change
18	Ivan Lewis	Bury South	104	Shadow Secretary of State for Culture, Media and Sport
19	Liam Byrne	Birmingham Hodge Hill	100	Shadow Minister for the Cabinet Office
20	Emily Thornberry	Islington South and Finsbury	99	
21	Peter Hain (Note: Peter Hain and Shaun Woodward were appointed to the Shadow Cabinet by Ed Miliband to serve as the Shadow Welsh and Northern Irish Secretaries, respectively.)	Neath	97	Shadow Secretary of State for Wales
22	Fiona Mactaggart	Slough	88	
23	Barbara Keeley	Worsley and Eccles South	87	
24	Vernon Coaker	Gedling	85	
25	Pat McFadden	Wolverhampton South East	84	
26†	Helen Goodman	Bishop Auckland	80	
26†	David Lammy	Tottenham	80	
28	Stephen Timms	East Ham	79	
29	Chris Bryant	Rhondda	77	
30	Shaun Woodward	St Helens South and Whiston	72	Shadow Secretary of State for Northern Ireland
31	Gareth Thomas	Harrow West	71	
32	Kevan Jones	North Durham	68	
33	Kevin Brennan	Cardiff West	64	
34	Roberta Blackman-Woods	City of Durham	63	
35	Diane Abbott	Hackney North and Stoke Newington	59	
36	Stephen Twigg	Liverpool West Derby	55	
37	Tom Harris	Glasgow South	54	
38	Ben Bradshaw	Exeter	53	
39	Iain Wright	Hartlepool	43	
40	Barry Gardiner	Brent North	41	
41	David Hanson	Delyn	38	
42	Ian Lucas	Wrexham	34	
43	Wayne David	Caerphilly	30	
44	Huw Irranca-Davies	Ogmore	28	
45	Chris Leslie	Nottingham East	26	
46	Robert Flello	Stoke-on-Trent South	15	
47	Mike Gapes	Ilford South	12	
48	Alun Michael	Cardiff South and Penarth	11	
49	Eric Joyce	Falkirk	10	

Notes
† Multiple candidates tied for position.

== Chief Whip election ==
At the same time they elect members of the Shadow Cabinet, the Commons PLP will elect the Opposition Chief Whip. The incumbent Chief Whip, Nick Brown, announced on 29 September that he would not be a candidate, writing in a letter to the new leader, Ed Miliband, that though he had intended to stand for election to the post, he was acceding to Miliband's request that he stand down. According to the BBC, after the announcement, Jim Fitzpatrick, who had also intended to stand for the post, withdrew his candidacy, and Miliband asked Rosie Winterton to stand, and she did so unopposed.
