= Smith shadow cabinet =

UK Labour Party shadow cabinet (1992–1994)

Smith Shadow Cabinet
- Shadow Cabinet of the United Kingdom
- 1992 – 1994
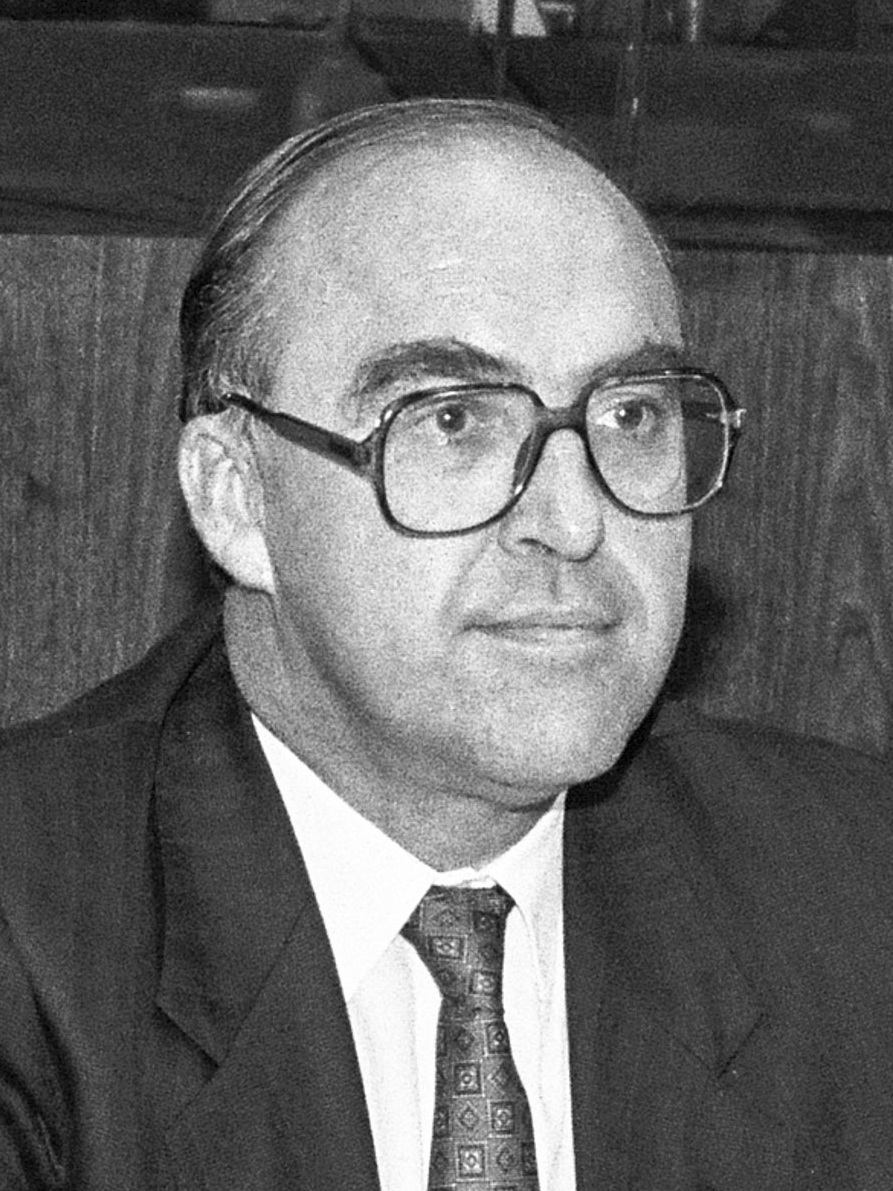
- Smith in 1989
- Date formed: 18 July 1992
- Date dissolved: 12 May 1994

People and organisations
- Monarch: Elizabeth II
- Leader of the Opposition: John Smith
- Deputy Leader of the Opposition: Margaret Beckett
- Member party: Labour Party
- Status in legislature: Official Opposition

History
- Election: 1992 Labour Party leadership election
- Legislature terms: 51st UK Parliament
- Predecessor: Kinnock shadow cabinet
- Successor: Beckett shadow cabinet

John Smith was Leader of the Labour Party and Leader of the Official Opposition from 18 July 1992 until his death on 12 May 1994. Smith became leader upon succeeding Neil Kinnock, who had resigned following the 1992 general election—for the fourth successive time, the Conservatives had won and Labour lost.

Prior to being Leader of the Opposition, Smith had been a member of the Government of James Callaghan as President of the Board of Trade (1978–1979), and served under his predecessor Neil Kinnock's Shadow Cabinet as Shadow Chancellor of the Exchequer (1987–1992).

Smith's tenure as Leader of the Opposition saw the Government's policies of the implementation of the Citizen's Charter, progress in the Northern Ireland peace negotiations, and the creation and centralisation of the European Union. Smith died suddenly on 12 May 1994, and was replaced as Acting Leader by Margaret Beckett, who served until 21 July 1994.

== Shadow Cabinet list ==
| Portfolio | Shadow Minister | Term |
|---|---|---|
| Leader of Her Majesty's Most Loyal Opposition; Leader of the Labour Party | The Rt Hon. John Smith | 1992–1994 |
| Deputy Leader of Her Majesty's Most Loyal Opposition; Deputy Leader of the Labour Party; Shadow Leader of the House of Commons; Election Co-ordinator | Margaret Beckett | 1992–1994 |
| Leader of the Opposition in the House of Lords | The Lord Richard | 1992–1997 |
| Labour Chief Whip in the House of Commons | Derek Foster | 1985–1995 |
| Labour Chief Whip in the House of Lords | The Lord Graham of Edmonton | 1990–1994 |
| Shadow Lord Chancellor | The Lord Irvine of Lairg | 1992–1997 |
| Shadow Chancellor of the Exchequer | Gordon Brown | 1992–1994 |
| Shadow Foreign Secretary | Jack Cunningham | 1992–1994 |
| Shadow Home Secretary | Tony Blair | 1992–1994 |
| Shadow Secretary of State for Defence | David Clark | 1992–1994 |
| Shadow Secretary of State for Education | Ann Taylor | 1992–1994 |
| Shadow Secretary of State for Employment | Frank Dobson | 1992–1993 |
| Shadow Secretary of State for Employment | John Prescott | 1993–1994 |
| Shadow Minister for Local Government and Housing | Jack Straw | 1992–1994 |
| Shadow Secretary of State for the Environment | Chris Smith | 1992–1994 |
| Shadow Secretary of State for Health | David Blunkett | 1992–1994 |
| Shadow Secretary of State for Social Security | Donald Dewar | 1992–1994 |
| Shadow Secretary of State for National Heritage | Bryan Gould | 1992 |
| Shadow Secretary of State for National Heritage | Ann Clwyd | 1992–1993 |
| Shadow Secretary of State for National Heritage | Mo Mowlam | 1993–1994 |
| Shadow Secretary of State for Trade and Industry | Robin Cook | 1992–1994 |
| Shadow Secretary of State for Transport | John Prescott | 1992–1993 |
| Shadow Secretary of State for Transport | Frank Dobson | 1993–1994 |
| Shadow Secretary of State for Scotland | Tom Clarke | 1992–1993 |
| Shadow Secretary of State for Scotland | George Robertson | 1993–1994 |
| Shadow Secretary of State for Wales | Ann Clwyd | 1992 |
| Shadow Secretary of State for Wales | Ron Davies | 1992–1994 |
| Shadow Secretary of State for Northern Ireland | Kevin McNamara | 1992–1994 |
| Shadow Minister for Overseas Development | Michael Meacher | 1992–1993 |
| Shadow Minister for Overseas Development | Tom Clarke | 1993–1994 |
| Shadow Chancellor of the Duchy of Lancaster; Shadow Spokesperson for the Citizen's Charter | Mo Mowlam | 1992–1993 |
| Shadow Chancellor of the Duchy of Lancaster; Shadow Spokesperson for the Citizen's Charter | Michael Meacher | 1993–1994 |
| Shadow Minister for the Status of Women | Mo Mowlam | 1992–1993 |
| Shadow Minister for the Status of Women | Clare Short | 1993–1994 |
| Shadow Spokesperson for Children and Families | Joan Lestor | 1993–1994 |
| Shadow Chief Secretary to the Treasury | Harriet Harman | 1992–1994 |
| Shadow Minister of Agriculture, Fisheries and Food | Ron Davies | 1992–1993 |
| Shadow Minister of Agriculture, Fisheries and Food | Gavin Strang | 1993–1994 |
| Shadow Minister for London | Chris Smith | 1992–1993 |
| Shadow Minister for London | Frank Dobson | 1993–1994 |

== Initial Shadow Cabinet ==
On 24 July 1992, John Smith announced the following Shadow Cabinet:

- John Smith – Leader of Her Majesty's Most Loyal Opposition and Leader of the Labour Party
- Margaret Beckett – Deputy Leader of Her Majesty's Most Loyal Opposition, Deputy Leader of the Labour Party, Shadow Leader of the House of Commons, and Elections Co-ordinator
- Gordon Brown – Shadow Chancellor of the Exchequer.
- Jack Cunningham – Shadow Foreign Secretary
- Tony Blair – Shadow Home Secretary
- David Clark – Shadow Secretary of State for Defence
- Ann Taylor – Shadow Secretary of State for Education
- Frank Dobson – Shadow Secretary of State for Employment
- Jack Straw – Shadow Minister for Local Government and Housing
- Chris Smith – Shadow Secretary of State for the Environment and Shadow Minister for London
- David Blunkett – Shadow Secretary of State for Health
- Donald Dewar – Shadow Secretary of State for Social Security
- Bryan Gould – Shadow Secretary of State for National Heritage
- Robin Cook – Shadow Secretary of State for Trade and Industry
- John Prescott – Shadow Secretary of State for Transport
- Tom Clarke – Shadow Secretary of State for Scotland
- Ann Clwyd – Shadow Secretary of State for Wales
- Kevin McNamara – Shadow Secretary of State for Northern Ireland
- Michael Meacher – Shadow Minister for Overseas Development
- Mo Mowlam – Shadow Chancellor of the Duchy of Lancaster, Shadow Minister for the Citizen's Charter, and Shadow Minister for the Status of Women
- Harriet Harman – Shadow Chief Secretary to the Treasury
- Ron Davies – Shadow Minister of Agriculture, Fisheries and Food
- Lord Richard – Leader of the Opposition in the House of Lords
- Derek Foster – Labour Chief Whip in the House of Commons
- Lord Graham of Edmonton – Labour Chief Whip in the House of Lords
- Lord Irvine of Lairg – Shadow Lord Chancellor

Changes

- 29 September 1992: Gould resigned over the Party's stance on the Maastricht Treaty. and was replaced as Shadow National Heritage Secretary by Ann Clwyd, who retained her position as Shadow Welsh Secretary.

== 1993 reshuffle ==
Smith reshuffled the Shadow Cabinet on 21 October 1993, following the 1993 Shadow Cabinet elections. Clwyd left the Shadow Cabinet. Mowlam replaced her as Shadow National Heritage Secretary, with Clare Short (who also lost in the Shadow Cabinet elections) replacing her as Shadow Minister for the Status of Women. Meacher replaced Mowlam as Shadow Chancellor of the Duchy of Lancaster and Shadow Minister for the Citizen's Charter. He was in turn replaced by Clarke at the Overseas Development portfolio, and Clarke was replaced as Scottish Spokesperson by new Shadow Cabinet minister George Robertson. Clwyd was replaced as Shadow Welsh Secretary by Davies, who was replaced at Agriculture by Gavin Strang. Prescott and Dobson exchanged portfolios (receiving Employment and Transport, respectively), with Dobson also taking London from Chris Smith. Blunkett became Chair of the Labour Party while retaining the Health portfolio.

- John Smith – Leader of Her Majesty's Most Loyal Opposition and Leader of the Labour Party
- Margaret Beckett – Deputy Leader of Her Majesty's Most Loyal Opposition, Deputy Leader of the Labour Party, Shadow Leader of the House of Commons, and Elections Co-ordinator
- Gordon Brown – Shadow Chancellor of the Exchequer
- Jack Cunningham – Shadow Foreign Secretary
- Tony Blair – Shadow Home Secretary
- David Clark – Shadow Secretary of State for Defence
- Ann Taylor – Shadow Secretary of State for Education
- Frank Dobson – Shadow Secretary of State for Transport and Shadow Minister for London
- Jack Straw – Shadow Minister for Local Government and Housing
- Chris Smith – Shadow Secretary of State for the Environment
- David Blunkett – Shadow Secretary of State for Health and Chair of the Labour Party
- Donald Dewar – Shadow Secretary of State for Social Security
- Mo Mowlam – Shadow Secretary of State for National Heritage
- Robin Cook – Shadow Secretary of State for Trade and Industry
- John Prescott – Shadow Secretary of State for Employment
- George Robertson – Shadow Secretary of State for Scotland
- Ron Davies – Shadow Secretary of State for Wales
- Kevin McNamara – Shadow Secretary of State for Northern Ireland
- Tom Clarke – Shadow Minister for Overseas Development
- Michael Meacher – Shadow Chancellor of the Duchy of Lancaster and Shadow Minister for the Citizen's Charter
- Clare Short – Shadow Minister for the Status of Women
- Harriet Harman – Shadow Chief Secretary to the Treasury
- Gavin Strang – Shadow Minister of Agriculture, Fisheries and Food
- Lord Richard – Leader of the Opposition in the House of Lords
- Derek Foster – Labour Chief Whip in the House of Commons
- Lord Graham of Edmonton – Labour Chief Whip in the House of Lords
- Lord Irvine of Lairg – Shadow Lord Chancellor

== See also ==
- 1992 Labour Party leadership election
- 1992 Labour Party Shadow Cabinet election
- 1993 Labour Party Shadow Cabinet election
