= Beckett shadow cabinet =

Beckett Shadow Cabinet
- Shadow Cabinet of the United Kingdom
- 1994
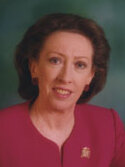
- Date formed: 12 May 1994
- Date dissolved: 21 July 1994

People and organisations
- Monarch: Elizabeth II
- Leader of the Opposition: Margaret Beckett
- Member party: Labour Party
- Status in legislature: Official Opposition

History
- Legislature terms: 51st UK Parliament
- Predecessor: Smith shadow cabinet
- Successor: Blair shadow cabinet

Margaret Beckett led the United Kingdom Shadow Cabinet when she was Leader of the Labour Party on a pro tempore Leader of the Opposition basis between the death of John Smith on 12 May 1994 and Tony Blair's election as Leader on 21 July 1994, an election in which Beckett was also a candidate. Her Shadow Cabinet was identical to Smith's final one with the exception of her role and the appointment of Nick Brown as Acting Shadow Leader of the House of Commons.

== Shadow Cabinet ==
Portfolio	Minister
Leader of Her Majesty's Most Loyal Opposition; Leader of the Labour Party (interim); Deputy Leader of the Labour Party; Shadow Leader of the House of Commons; Election Co-ordinator	The Rt Hon. Margaret Beckett
Leader of the Opposition in the House of Lords	The Rt Hon. The Lord Richard PC
Labour Chief Whip in the House of Commons	The Rt Hon. Derek Foster
Labour Chief Whip in the House of Lords	The Lord Graham of Edmonton
Shadow Lord Chancellor	The Lord Irvine of Lairg
Shadow Chancellor of the Exchequer	Gordon Brown
Shadow Foreign Secretary	The Rt Hon. Jack Cunningham
Shadow Home Secretary	Tony Blair
Shadow Secretary of State for Defence	David Clark
Shadow Secretary of State for Education	Ann Taylor
Shadow Secretary of State for Employment	John Prescott
Shadow Minister for Local Government and Housing	Jack Straw
Shadow Secretary of State for the Environment	Chris Smith
Shadow Secretary of State for Health	David Blunkett
Shadow Secretary of State for Social Security	Donald Dewar
Shadow Secretary of State for National Heritage	Mo Mowlam
Shadow Secretary of State for Trade and Industry	Robin Cook
Shadow Secretary of State for Transport; Shadow Minister for London	Frank Dobson
Shadow Secretary of State for Scotland	George Robertson
Shadow Secretary of State for Wales	Ron Davies
Shadow Secretary of State for Northern Ireland	Kevin McNamara
Shadow Minister for Overseas Development	Tom Clarke
Shadow Chancellor of the Duchy of Lancaster; Shadow Spokesperson for the Citizen's Charter	Michael Meacher
Shadow Minister for the Status of Women	Clare Short
Shadow Spokesperson for Children and Families	Joan Lestor
Shadow Chief Secretary to the Treasury	Harriet Harman
Shadow Minister of Agriculture, Fisheries and Food	Gavin Strang
Acting Shadow Leader of the House of Commons	Nick Brown

== See also ==
- 1994 Labour Party leadership election
