= Shadow Secretary of State for Digital, Culture, Media and Sport =

Shadow Cabinet office

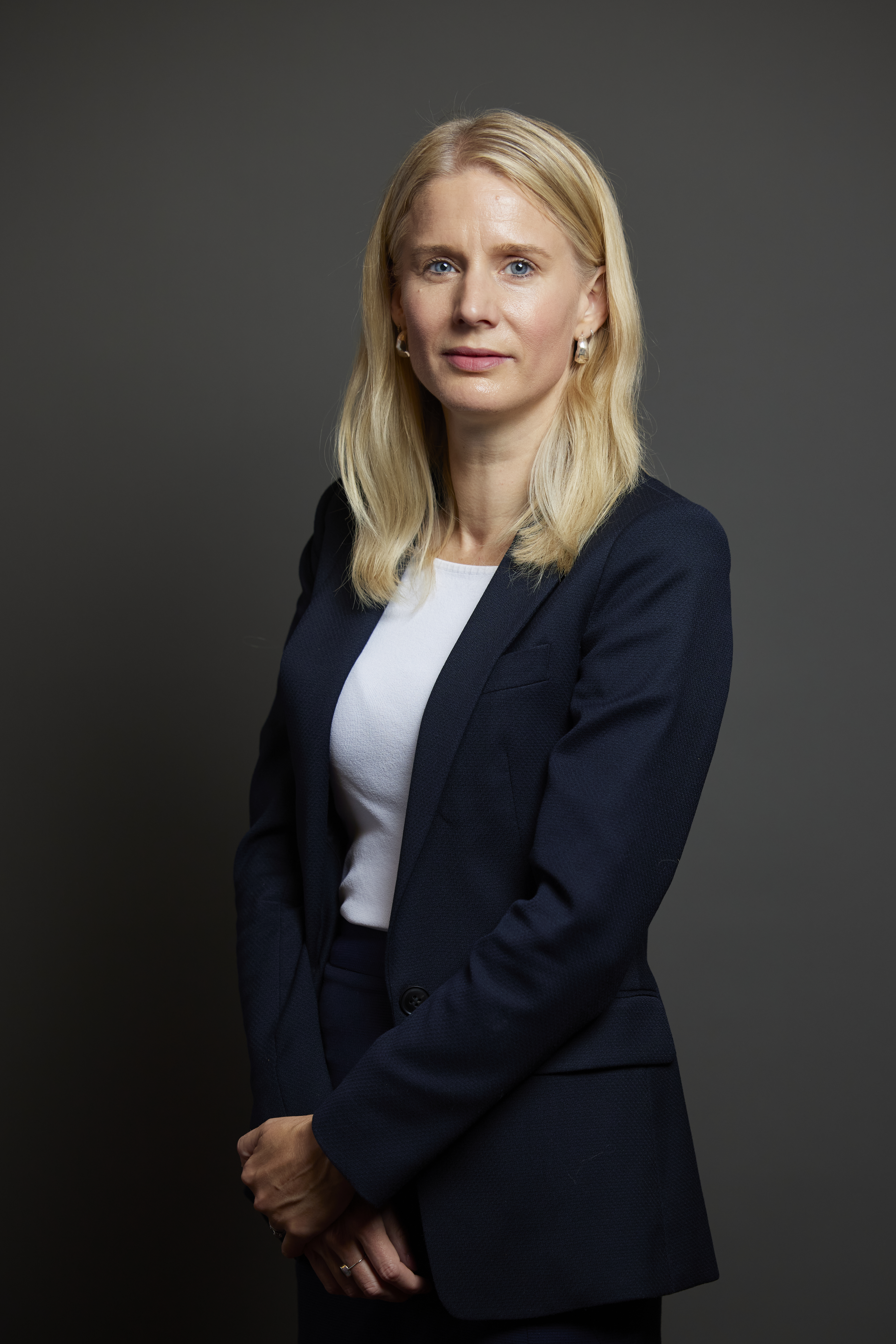
- Incumbent; Rebecca Paul since 31 August 2026
- Style: Shadow Culture Secretary (informal)
- Member of: Official Opposition Shadow Cabinet
- Appointer: Leader of the Opposition
- Inaugural holder: Bryan Gould
- Formation: 18 July 1992

The shadow secretary of state for digital, culture, media and sport (DCMS), previously the shadow secretary of state for national heritage and shadow secretary of state for culture, media and sport, is a position in the Official Opposition Shadow Cabinet.

The shadow secretary of state is the opposite number to the secretary of state for digital, culture, media and sport, holding them and their department to account. They are the lead opposition spokesperson on culture, media and sport issues.

The post was created in 1992 after John Major established the Department of National Heritage and secretary of state for national heritage, with the opposition forming an equivalent shadow post. The title and remit of the post has adjusted over time, following changes in those of the cabinet post it is shadowing. An exception to this occurred in 2010–2012, where the opposition did not follow the government's approach of merging the ministery for the Olympics into that for culture, media and sport.

== List of shadow secretaries of state ==
=== Shadow secretaries of state for national heritage (1992–97) ===
Name	Portrait	Term of office		Party	Shadow Cabinet
Bryan Gould		18 July 1992	29 September 1992	Labour	Smith
Ann Clwyd		29 September 1992	21 October 1993	Labour	Smith
Mo Mowlam		21 October 1993	21 July 1994	Labour	Smith
Mo Mowlam		21 October 1993	21 July 1994	Labour	Beckett
Chris Smith		21 July 1994	19 October 1995	Labour	Blair
Jack Cunningham		19 October 1995	2 May 1997	Labour	Blair
Virginia Bottomley		2 May 1997	11 June 1997	Conservative	Major

=== Shadow secretaries of state for culture, media and sport (1997–2017) ===
Name	Portrait	Term of office		Party	Shadow Cabinet
Francis Maude		11 June 1997	1 June 1998	Conservative	Hague
Peter Ainsworth		1 June 1998	18 September 2001	Conservative	Hague
Tim Yeo		18 September 2001	23 July 2002	Conservative	Duncan Smith
John Whittingdale		23 July 2002	6 November 2003	Conservative	Duncan Smith
Julie Kirkbride		6 November 2003	19 June 2004	Conservative	Howard
John Whittingdale		19 June 2004	6 May 2005	Conservative	Howard
Theresa May		6 May 2005	8 December 2005	Conservative	Howard
Hugo Swire		8 December 2005	2 July 2007	Conservative	Cameron
Jeremy Hunt		2 July 2007	11 May 2010	Conservative	Cameron
Ben Bradshaw		11 May 2010	8 October 2010	Labour	Harman I
Ivan Lewis		8 October 2010	7 October 2011	Labour	Miliband
Harriet Harman		7 October 2011	11 May 2015	Labour	Miliband
Chris Bryant		11 May 2015	13 September 2015	Labour	Harman II
Michael Dugher		13 September 2015	5 January 2016	Labour	Corbyn
Maria Eagle		6 January 2016	27 June 2016	Labour	Corbyn
Kelvin Hopkins		28 June 2016	7 October 2016	Labour	Corbyn
Tom Watson		7 October 2016	3 July 2017	Labour	Corbyn

=== Shadow secretaries of state for digital, culture, media and sport (2017–2023) ===
Name	Portrait	Term of office		Party	Shadow Cabinet
Tom Watson		3 July 2017	12 December 2019	Labour	Corbyn
Tracy Brabin		7 January 2020	6 April 2020	Labour	Corbyn
Jo Stevens		6 April 2020	29 November 2021	Labour	Starmer
Lucy Powell		29 November 2021	4 September 2023	Labour	Starmer

=== Shadow secretaries of state for culture, media and sport (2023–2026) ===
Name	Portrait	Term of office		Party	Shadow Cabinet
Thangam Debbonaire		4 September 2023	5 July 2024	Labour	Starmer
Julia Lopez		8 July 2024	5 November 2024	Conservative	Sunak
Stuart Andrew		5 November 2024	22 July 2025	Conservative	Badenoch
Nigel Huddleston		22 July 2025	31 August 2026	Conservative	Badenoch

=== Shadow secretaries of state for digital, culture, media and sport (2023–present) ===
Name	Portrait	Term of office		Party	Shadow Cabinet
Rebecca Paul		31 August 2026	Incumbent	Conservative	Badenoch

== See also ==
- Official Opposition frontbench
- Secretary of State for Culture, Media and Sport
- Department for Culture, Media and Sport
