= Shadow Lord Chancellor =

Member of the British Shadow Cabinet

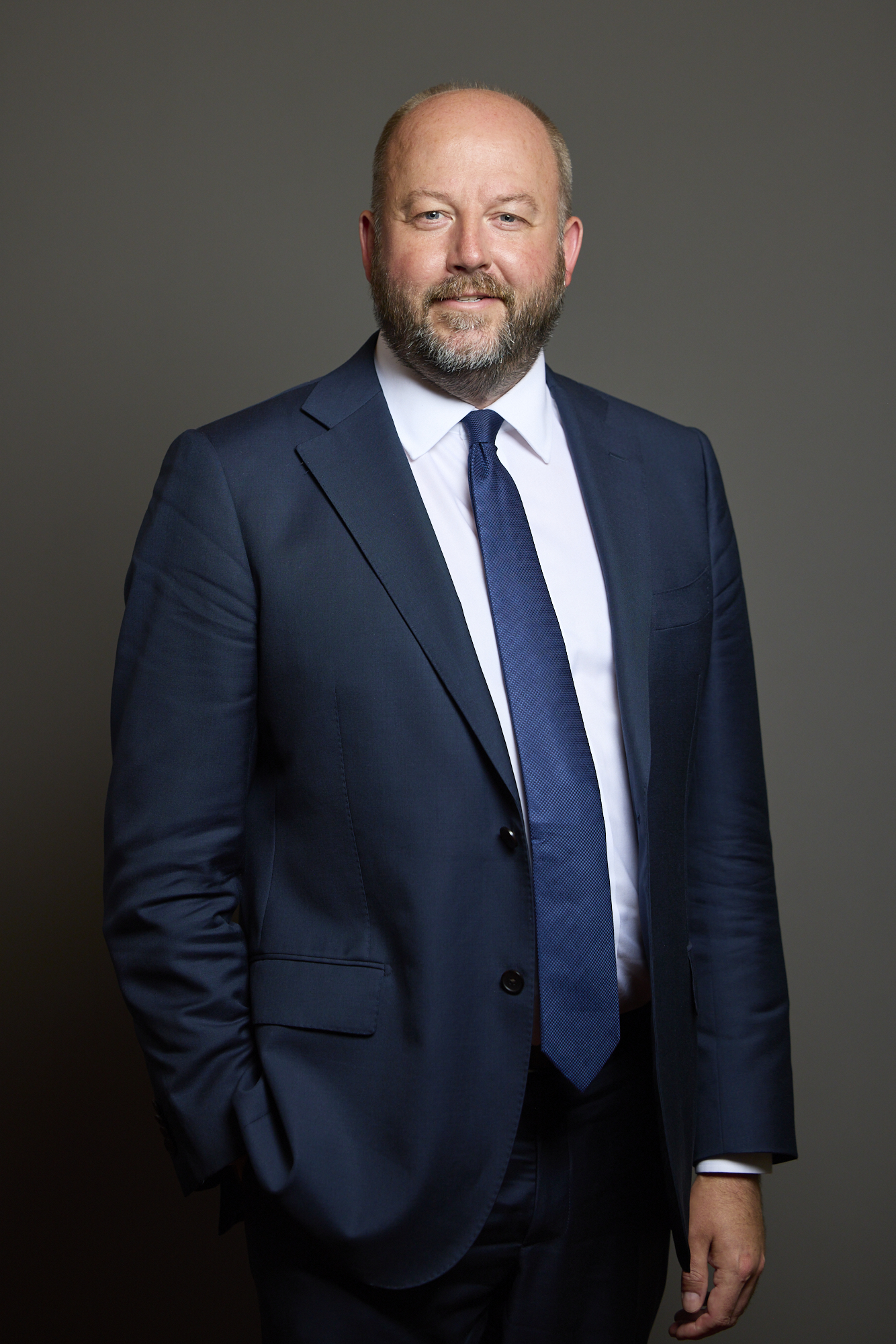
- Incumbent; Nick Timothy since 15 January 2026
- Appointer: Leader of the Opposition
- Inaugural holder: The Lord Elwyn-Jones
- Formation: 2 October 1983
- Website: The Shadow Cabinet

The shadow lord chancellor is a member of the British Shadow Cabinet shadowing the lord chancellor, an office which has existed since the Norman Conquest. Since 2010, the officeholder has jointly held the title Shadow Secretary of State for Justice. The position is currently held by Nick Timothy.

== Shadow lord chancellors ==
Name		Took office	Left office	Political party	Shadow Cabinet
The Lord Elwyn-Jones		2 October 1983	9 January 1989	Labour	Kinnock
The Lord Mishcon		9 January 1989	18 July 1992	Labour	Kinnock
The Lord Irvine of Lairg		18 June 1992	2 May 1997	Labour	Smith; Beckett; Blair
The Lord Mackay of Clashfern		2 May 1997	11 June 1997	Conservative	Major
The Lord Kingsland (Note: Kingsland remained Shadow Lord Chancellor after the Government effectively combined the office of Lord Chancellor with the Constitutional Affairs (later Justice) Secretary mid-2003.)		11 June 1997	12 July 2009	Conservative	Hague; Duncan Smith; Howard; Cameron
Vacant (Note: The Conservatives did not appoint a Shadow Lord Chancellor after Kingsland's death.)		12 July 2009	11 May 2010		
Jack Straw		11 May 2010	7 October 2010	Labour	Harman I
Sadiq Khan		8 October 2010	11 May 2015	Labour	Miliband
The Lord Falconer of Thoroton		11 May 2015	26 June 2016	Labour	Harman II
The Lord Falconer of Thoroton		11 May 2015	26 June 2016	Labour	Corbyn
Richard Burgon		27 June 2016	5 April 2020	Labour	Corbyn
David Lammy		6 April 2020	29 November 2021	Labour	Starmer
Steve Reed		29 November 2021	4 September 2023	Labour	Starmer
Shabana Mahmood	British shadow cabinet reshuffle - 4 September 2023	4 September 2023	5 July 2024	Labour	Starmer
Edward Argar		8 July 2024	4 November 2024	Conservative	Sunak
Robert Jenrick		4 November 2024	15 January 2026	Conservative	Badenoch
Nick Timothy		15 January 2026	Incumbent	Conservative	Badenoch
