= 1993 Labour Party Shadow Cabinet election =

Interparty election

Elections to the Labour Party's Shadow Cabinet took place in October 1993, at the beginning of the 1993/1994 session of parliament. Under the rules then in effect, the Commons members of the Parliamentary Labour Party elected 18 members of the Official Opposition Shadow Cabinet, who were then assigned portfolios by the leader. The Commons members of the PLP separately elected the Chief Whip, and the Labour peers elected the Leader of the Opposition in the House of Lords. In addition, the Leader of the Labour Party and Deputy Leader (John Smith and Margaret Beckett, respectively) were members by virtue of those offices. The 18 elected members of the Shadow Cabinet were the ones with the largest number of votes. Beginning with this election, MPs were required to vote for at least four women, but women were no longer guaranteed three places in the Shadow Cabinet.

Colour key	Retained in the Shadow Cabinet
Colour key	Joined the Shadow Cabinet
Colour key	Voted out of the Shadow Cabinet

Rank	Candidate	Constituency	Votes
1	Robin Cook	Livingston	177
2†	Frank Dobson	Holborn and St Pancras	163
2†	John Prescott	Kingston upon Hull East	163
4	Gordon Brown	Dunfermline East	160
5	Mo Mowlam	Redcar	156
6	Tony Blair	Sedgefield	142
7	David Clark	South Shields	133
8	Jack Straw	Blackburn	130
9	Chris Smith	Islington South and Finsbury	124
10	Michael Meacher	Oldham West	122
11†	Ron Davies	Caerphilly	121
11†	Donald Dewar	Glasgow Garscadden	121
13	Tom Clarke	Monklands West	120
14	Ann Taylor	Dewsbury	116
15†	Joan Lestor	Eccles	110
15†	George Robertson	Hamilton	110
17†	David Blunkett	Sheffield Brightside	107
17†	Jack Cunningham	Copeland	107
19†	Ann Clwyd	Cynon Valley	104
19†	Joyce Quin	Gateshead East	104
21	Clare Short	Birmingham Ladywood	101
22	Harriet Harman	Peckham	99
23	Tony Lloyd	Stretford	95
24	Gavin Strang	Edinburgh East	90
25	Irene Adams	Paisley North	88
26	Kevin McNamara	Kingston upon Hull North	87
26	Dawn Primarolo	Bristol South	87
28	Gwyneth Dunwoody	Crewe and Nantwich	82
39	Mildred Gordon	Bow and Poplar	81
30	Derek Fatchett	Leeds Central	78
31	Stuart Bell	Middlesbrough	75
32	Maria Fyfe	Glasgow Maryhill	70
33	Chris Mullin	Sunderland South	69
34	Alun Michael	Cardiff West	63
35	Llin Golding	Newcastle-under-Lyme	62
36	Alistair Darling	Edinburgh Central	60
37	Henry McLeish	Central Fife	56
38	John Marek	Wrexham	48
39	Joan Ruddock	Lewisham Deptford	47
40	Tony Banks	Newham North West	46
41†	Kate Hoey	Vauxhall	40
41†	Rhodri Morgan	Cardiff South and Penarth	40
43	John Garrett	Norwich South	43
44	Graham Allen	Nottingham North	29

† Multiple candidates tied for position.
