= Shadow Secretary of State for Work and Pensions =

British Shadow Cabinet position

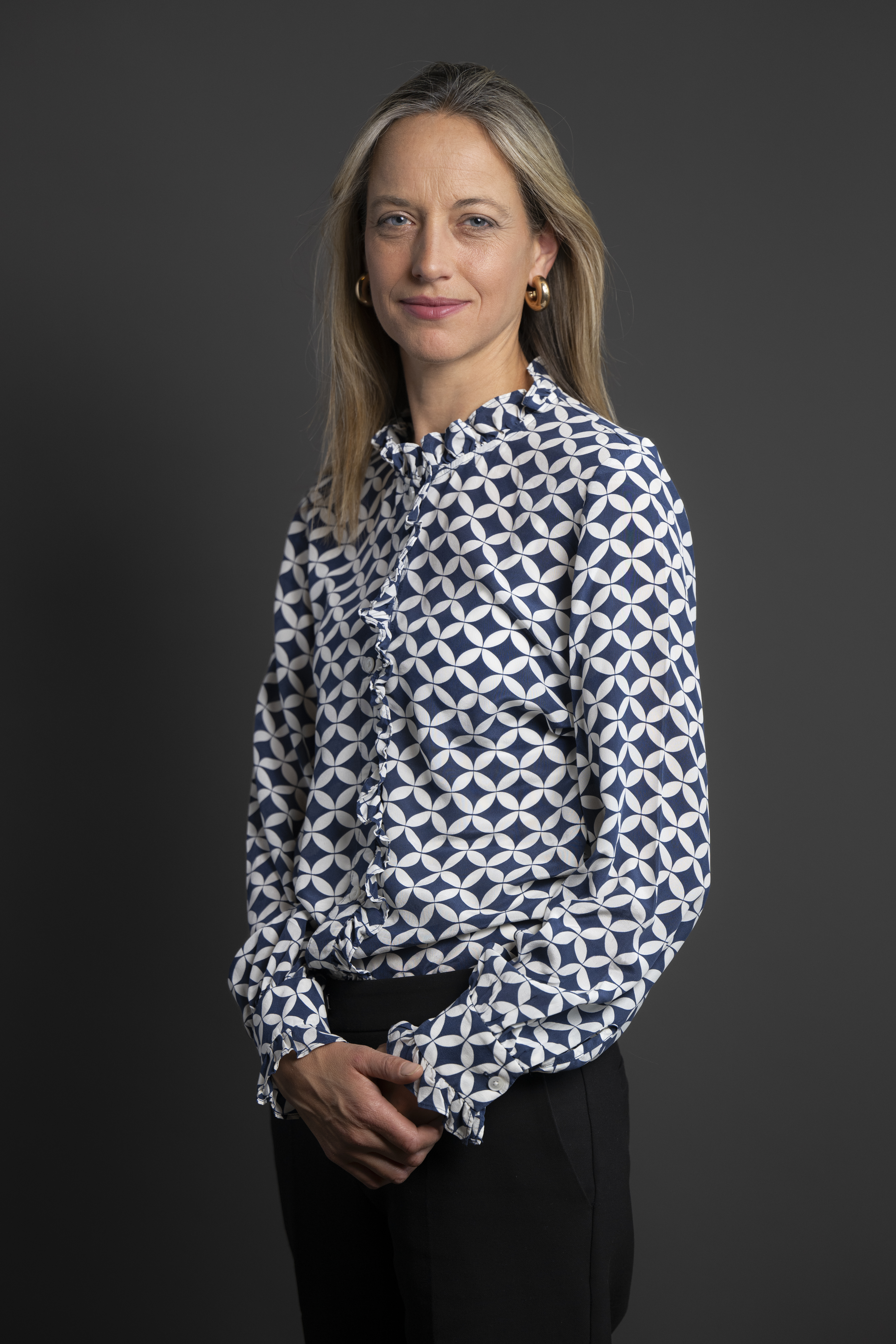
- Incumbent; Helen Whately since 5 November 2024
- Member of: Opposition Shadow Cabinet
- Appointer: Leader of the Opposition
- Website: Opposition Cabinet

The shadow secretary of state for work and pensions is an office within British politics held by a member of His Majesty's Loyal Opposition. The duty of the office holder is to scrutinise the actions of the government's secretary of state for work and pensions and develop alternative policies.

== List of shadow secretaries ==
=== Shadow Minister of Pensions and National Insurance ===
Name	Entered office	Left office	Political party	Shadow Cabinet
Hilary Marquand	15 July 1955	16 November 1959	Labour	Attlee
Hilary Marquand	15 July 1955	16 November 1959	Labour	Gaitskell
Richard Crossman	16 November 1959	14 March 1960	Labour	Gaitskell
Douglas Houghton	14 March 1960	21 February 1963	Labour	Gaitskell
Douglas Houghton	14 March 1960	21 February 1963	Labour	Brown
Dick Mitchison	21 February 1963	16 October 1964	Labour	Wilson
Richard Wood	16 October 1964	29 October 1964	Conservative	Douglas-Home
Margaret Thatcher	29 October 1964	6 October 1965	Conservative	Douglas-Home
Margaret Thatcher	29 October 1964	6 October 1965	Conservative	Heath
Charles Longbottom	6 October 1965	13 April 1966	Conservative	Heath
=== Shadow Secretary of State for Health and Social Services ===
See Shadow Secretary of State for Health and Social Services
=== Shadow Secretary of State for Social Security ===
Michael Meacher	2 November 1989	18 July 1992	Labour	Kinnock
Donald Dewar	18 July 1992	19 October 1995	Labour	Smith
Donald Dewar	18 July 1992	19 October 1995	Labour	Beckett
Donald Dewar	18 July 1992	19 October 1995	Labour	Blair
Chris Smith	19 October 1995	1 July 1996	Labour	Blair
Harriet Harman	1 July 1996	2 May 1997	Labour	Blair
Peter Lilley	2 May 1997	19 June 1997	Conservative	Major
Iain Duncan Smith	19 June 1997	15 June 1999	Conservative	Hague
David Willetts	15 June 1999	14 September 2001	Conservative	Hague
=== Shadow Secretary of State for Work and Pensions ===
David Willetts	14 September 2001	6 May 2005	Conservative	Duncan Smith
David Willetts	14 September 2001	6 May 2005	Conservative	Howard
Malcolm Rifkind	6 May 2005	6 December 2005	Conservative	Howard
Philip Hammond	6 December 2005	2 July 2007	Conservative	Cameron
Chris Grayling	2 July 2007	19 January 2009	Conservative	Cameron
Theresa May	19 January 2009	11 May 2010	Conservative	Cameron
Yvette Cooper	11 May 2010	8 October 2010	Labour	Harman I
Douglas Alexander	8 October 2010	20 January 2011	Labour	Miliband
Liam Byrne	20 January 2011	7 October 2013	Labour	Miliband
Rachel Reeves	7 October 2013	8 June 2015	Labour	Miliband
Stephen Timms; Acting	8 June 2015	13 September 2015	Labour	Harman II
Owen Smith	14 September 2015	27 June 2016	Labour	Corbyn
Debbie Abrahams	27 June 2016	11 March 2018	Labour	Corbyn
Margaret Greenwood	11 March 2018	6 April 2020	Labour	Corbyn
Jonathan Reynolds	6 April 2020	29 November 2021	Labour & Co-op	Starmer
Jonathan Ashworth	29 November 2021	4 September 2023	Labour & Co-op	Starmer
Liz Kendall	4 September 2023	5 July 2024	Labour	Starmer
Mel Stride	8 July 2024	4 November 2024	Conservative	Sunak
Helen Whately	5 November 2024	Incumbent	Conservative	Badenoch
