= 1994 Labour Party Shadow Cabinet election =

1994 UK election

Elections to the Labour Party's Shadow Cabinet took place in October 1994, at the beginning of the 1994/5 session of parliament. Under the rules then in effect, the Commons members of the Parliamentary Labour Party elected 18 members of the Official Opposition Shadow Cabinet, who were then assigned portfolios by the leader. The Commons members of the PLP separately elected the Chief Whip, and the Labour peers elected the Leader of the Opposition in the House of Lords. In addition, the Leader of the Labour Party and Deputy Leader (Tony Blair and John Prescott, respectively) were members by virtue of those offices. The 18 elected members of the Shadow Cabinet were the ones with the largest number of votes. MPs were required to vote for at least four women, but women were not necessarily guaranteed places in the Shadow Cabinet.

| Colour key | Retained in the Shadow Cabinet |
| Colour key | Joined the Shadow Cabinet |
| Colour key | Voted out of the Shadow Cabinet |

| Rank | Candidate | Constituency | Votes |
|---|---|---|---|
| 1 | Robin Cook | Livingston | 187 |
| 2 | Margaret Beckett | Derby South | 170 |
| 3 | Gordon Brown | Dunfermline East | 167 |
| 4 | Donald Dewar | Glasgow Garscadden | 142 |
| 5 | Harriet Harman | Peckham | 141 |
| 6 | Frank Dobson | Holborn and St Pancras | 137 |
| 7 | George Robertson | Hamilton | 126 |
| 8† | Mo Mowlam | Redcar | 125 |
| 8† | Chris Smith | Islington South and Finsbury | 125 |
| 10 | Jack Cunningham | Copeland | 120 |
| 11 | Michael Meacher | Oldham West | 114 |
| 12 | Ron Davies | Caerphilly | 113 |
| 13 | David Clark | South Shields | 109 |
| 14 | Jack Straw | Blackburn | 106 |
| 15† | David Blunkett | Sheffield Brightside | 100 |
| 15† | Joan Lestor | Eccles | 100 |
| 17† | Gavin Strang | Edinburgh East | 97 |
| 17† | Ann Taylor | Dewsbury | 97 |
| 19† | Ann Clwyd | Cynon Valley | 94 |
| 19† | Clare Short | Birmingham Ladywood | 94 |
| 21 | Hilary Armstrong | North West Durham | 93 |
| 22 | Derek Fatchett | Leeds Central | 88 |
| 23† | Nick Brown | Newcastle-upon-Tyne North | 86 |
| 23† | Tony Lloyd | Stretford | 86 |
| 23† | Brian Wilson | Cunninghame North | 86 |
| 26 | Tom Clarke | Monklands West | 83 |
| 27 | Alun Michael | Cardiff West | 81 |
| 28 | Joyce Quin | Gateshead East | 78 |
| 29 | Dawn Primarolo | Bristol South | 75 |
| 30 | Kevin McNamara | Kingston upon Hull North | 70 |
| 31 | Stuart Bell | Middlesbrough | 67 |
| 32 | Alistair Darling | Edinburgh Central | 61 |
| 33 | Chris Mullin | Sunderland South | 59 |
| 34 | George Foulkes | Carrick, Cumnock and Doon Valley | 58 |
| 35† | Irene Adams | Paisley North | 57 |
| 35† | John Marek | Wrexham | 57 |
| 37 | Llin Golding | Newcastle-under-Lyme | 56 |
| 38 | Mildred Gordon | Bow and Poplar | 48 |
| 39 | Martin O'Neill | Clackmannan | 45 |
| 40† | Maria Fyfe | Glasgow Maryhill | 43 |
| 40† | Henry McLeish | Central Fife | 43 |
| 42† | Tony Banks | Newham North West | 42 |
| 42† | Joan Ruddock | Lewisham Deptford | 42 |
| 44 | Kate Hoey | Vauxhall | 41 |
| 45 | Ian McCartney | Makerfield | 40 |
| 46 | John McFall | Dumbarton | 38 |
| 47 | Jeff Rooker | Birmingham Perry Barr | 35 |
| 48 | Joan Walley | Stoke-on-Trent North | 32 |
| 49 | Jeremy Corbyn | Islington North | 31 |
| 50 | Barry Sheerman | Huddersfield | 30 |
| 51 | Rhodri Morgan | Cardiff South and Penarth | 28 |
| 52 | Clive Soley | Hammersmith | 24 |

† Multiple candidates tied for position.
