= 1992 Labour Party Shadow Cabinet election =

Elections to the Labour Party's Shadow Cabinet took place in July 1992. Shadow Cabinet elections generally take place at the beginning of a parliamentary session, but the 1992 vote was postponed until a new leader was elected to replace Neil Kinnock. Under the rules then in effect, the Commons members of the Parliamentary Labour Party elected 18 members of the Official Opposition Shadow Cabinet, who were then assigned portfolios by the leader. The Commons members of the PLP separately elected the Chief Whip, and the Labour peers elected the Leader of the Opposition in the House of Lords. In addition, the Leader of the Labour Party and Deputy Leader (John Smith and Margaret Beckett, respectively) were members by virtue of those offices. The 18 elected members of the Shadow Cabinet were the ones with the largest number of votes, except that the three women with the most votes would be included in the 18, even if they were not among the top 18 based on the number of votes.

Colour key	Retained in the Shadow Cabinet
Colour key	Joined the Shadow Cabinet
Colour key	Voted out of the Shadow Cabinet

Rank	Candidate	Constituency	Votes
1	Gordon Brown	Dunfermline East	165
2	Tony Blair	Sedgefield	150
3	Robin Cook	Livingston	149
4	Frank Dobson	Holborn and St Pancras	140
5	John Prescott	Kingston upon Hull East	137
6†	Bryan Gould	Dagenham	135
6†	Harriet Harman	Peckham	135
6†	Mo Mowlam	Redcar	135
6†	Chris Smith	Islington South and Finsbury	135
10	Ann Clwyd	Cynon Valley	133
11	Ann Taylor	Dewsbury	129
12	Jack Cunningham	Copeland	124
13	Michael Meacher	Oldham West	122
14	Donald Dewar	Glasgow Garscadden	121
15	David Blunkett	Sheffield Brightside	112
16	Jack Straw	Blackburn	111
17	Tom Clarke	Monklands West	105
18	David Clark	South Shields	104
19	Ron Davies	Caerphilly	89
20	George Robertson	Hamilton	82
21	Barry Jones	Alyn and Deeside	80
22	Clare Short	Birmingham Ladywood	73
23†	Dawn Primarolo	Bristol South	71
23†	Joyce Quin	Gateshead East	71
25	Hilary Armstrong	North West Durham	70
26	Martin O'Neill	Clackmannan	63
27	Jo Richardson	Barking	62
28	Kevin McNamara	Kingston upon Hull North	61
29	Stuart Bell	Middlesbrough	60
30	Chris Mullin	Sunderland South	58
31	George Foulkes	Carrick, Cumnock and Doon Valley	57
32	Derek Fatchett	Leeds Central	54
33†	Henry McLeish	Central Fife	53
33†	Clive Soley	Hammersmith	53
35	Llin Golding	Newcastle-under-Lyme	51
36†	Mildred Gordon	Bow and Poplar	47
36†	Tony Benn	Chesterfield	47
38	Jeff Rooker	Birmingham Perry Barr	44
39†	Tony Banks	Newham North West	42
39†	Bruce Grocott	The Wrekin	42
41	Mark Fisher	Stoke-on-Trent Central	41
42†	Alun Michael	Cardiff West	39
42†	Gavin Strang	Edinburgh East	39
44	John Marek	Wrexham	38
45	Alf Morris	Manchester Wythenshawe	37
46	Tony Lloyd	Stretford	33
47	Barry Sheerman	Huddersfield	31
48†	Graham Allen	Nottingham North	29
48†	Bernie Grant	Tottenham	29
50†	Dennis Canavan	Falkirk West	26
50†	John Garrett	Norwich South	26
52	Austin Mitchell	Great Grimsby	20
53	Stuart Randall	Kingston upon Hull West	19

† Multiple candidates tied for position.
