= 1996 Labour Party Shadow Cabinet election =

Elections to the Labour Party's Shadow Cabinet took place in July 1996. Under the rules then in effect, the Commons members of the Parliamentary Labour Party elected 19 members of the Official Opposition Shadow Cabinet, who were then assigned portfolios by the leader. The Labour peers elected the Leader of the Opposition in the House of Lords. In addition, the Leader of the Labour Party and Deputy Leader (Tony Blair and John Prescott, respectively) were members by virtue of those offices. The 19 elected members of the Shadow Cabinet were the ones with the largest number of votes. MPs were required to vote for at least four women, but women were not necessarily guaranteed places in the Shadow Cabinet.

Colour key	Retained in the Shadow Cabinet
Colour key	Joined the Shadow Cabinet
Colour key	Voted out of the Shadow Cabinet

Rank	Candidate	Constituency	Votes
1	Margaret Beckett	Derby South	251
2	Ann Taylor	Dewsbury	250
3	Clare Short	Birmingham Ladywood	218
4	Gavin Strang	Edinburgh East	217
5	Robin Cook	Livingston	215
6	Donald Dewar	Glasgow Garscadden	212
7	Frank Dobson	Holborn and St Pancras	211
8	Mo Mowlam	Redcar	206
9†	David Clark	South Shields	205
9†	Michael Meacher	Oldham West	205
11	Ron Davies	Caerphilly	201
12	Jack Cunningham	Copeland	190
13	Jack Straw	Blackburn	189
14†	Gordon Brown	Dunfermline East	188
14†	Chris Smith	Islington South and Finsbury	148
16	George Robertson	Hamilton	182
17†	David Blunkett	Sheffield Brightside	175
17†	Tom Clarke	Monklands West	175
19	Harriet Harman	Peckham	149
20	Ann Clwyd	Cynon Valley	94
21†	Lynne Jones	Birmingham Selly Oak	66
21†	Chris Mullin	Sunderland South	66
23	Paul Flynn	Newport West	61
24	Tony Banks	Newham North West	47
25	Dennis Canavan	Falkirk West	42
26	Jeremy Corbyn	Islington North	37

† Multiple candidates tied for position.
