= Shadow Chancellor of the Exchequer =

Member of the British Shadow Cabinet

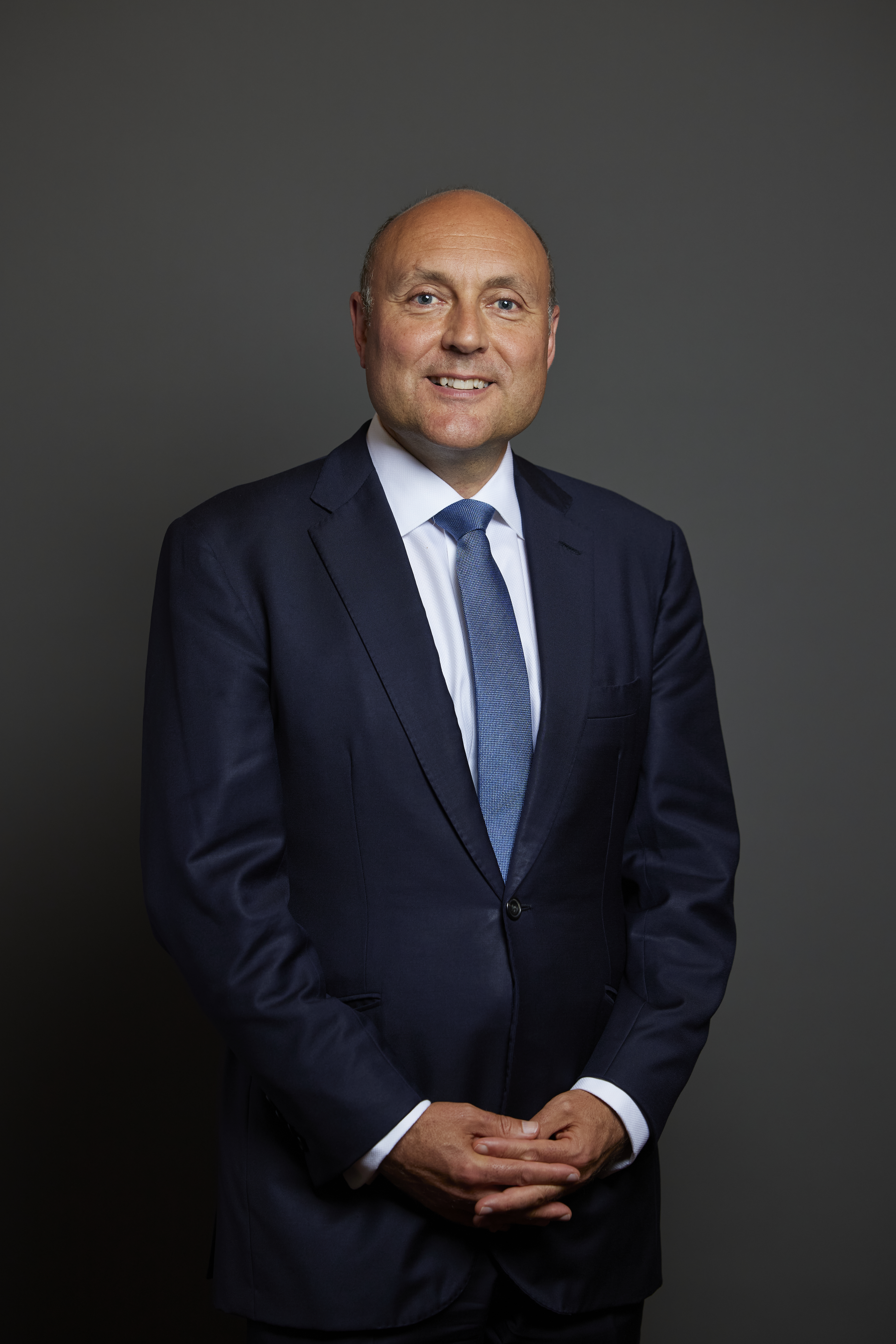
- Incumbent; Andrew Griffith since 31 August 2026
- Style: Shadow Chancellor (informal)
- Member of: Official Opposition Shadow Cabinet
- Appointer: Leader of the Opposition
- Inaugural holder: Rab Butler
- Deputy: Shadow Chief Secretary to the Treasury

The shadow chancellor of the exchequer in the British Parliamentary system is the member of the Shadow Cabinet who is responsible for shadowing the chancellor of the exchequer. The title is given at the gift of the leader of the Opposition and has no formal constitutional role, but is generally considered the second-most senior position, unless a shadow deputy prime minister is chosen, on the opposition frontbench, after the leader. Past shadow chancellors include Harold Wilson, James Callaghan, Edward Heath, Geoffrey Howe, Kenneth Clarke, Gordon Brown, John McDonnell and Rachel Reeves.

The name for the position has a mixed history. It is used to designate the lead economic spokesman for the Opposition. The name 'Shadow Chancellor' has also been used for the corresponding position for the Liberal Democrats, the Liberal Democrat Treasury spokesperson. This was a source of humour for Chancellor Gordon Brown, who in 2005 played the two off against one another in Parliament, saying, "I, too, have a great deal of time for the shadow chancellor who resides in Twickenham [Liberal Democrat Vince Cable], rather than the shadow chancellor for the Conservative Party."

== List of shadow chancellors ==
Name	Portrait	Entered office	Left office	Party	Shadow Cabinet
Oliver Stanley		Unknown	10 December 1950	Conservative	Churchill
Rab Butler		10 December 1950	26 October 1951	Conservative	Churchill
Hugh Gaitskell		26 October 1951	15 February 1956	Labour	Attlee
Hugh Gaitskell		26 October 1951	15 February 1956	Labour	Gaitskell
Harold Wilson		15 February 1956	30 November 1961	Labour	Gaitskell
James Callaghan		30 November 1961	16 October 1964	Labour	Gaitskell
James Callaghan		30 November 1961	16 October 1964	Labour	Wilson I
Reginald Maudling		16 October 1964	16 February 1965	Conservative	Douglas-Home
Edward Heath		16 February 1965	28 July 1965	Conservative	Douglas-Home
Iain Macleod		28 July 1965	20 June 1970	Conservative	Heath I
Roy Jenkins		20 June 1970	19 April 1972	Labour	Wilson II
Denis Healey		19 April 1972	4 March 1974	Labour	Wilson II
Anthony Barber		4 March 1974	11 March 1974	Conservative	Heath II
Robert Carr		11 March 1974	11 February 1975	Conservative	Heath II
Geoffrey Howe		11 February 1975	4 May 1979	Conservative	Thatcher
Denis Healey		4 May 1979	8 December 1980	Labour	Callaghan
Peter Shore		8 December 1980	31 October 1983	Labour	Foot
Roy Hattersley		31 October 1983	13 July 1987	Labour	Kinnock
John Smith		13 July 1987	24 July 1992	Labour	Kinnock
Gordon Brown		24 July 1992	2 May 1997	Labour	Smith
Gordon Brown		24 July 1992	2 May 1997	Labour	Beckett
Gordon Brown		24 July 1992	2 May 1997	Labour	Blair
Ken Clarke		2 May 1997	11 June 1997	Conservative	Major
Peter Lilley		11 June 1997	2 June 1998	Conservative	Hague
Francis Maude		2 June 1998	1 February 2000	Conservative	Hague
Michael Portillo		1 February 2000	18 September 2001	Conservative	Hague
Michael Howard		18 September 2001	6 November 2003	Conservative	Duncan Smith
Oliver Letwin		6 November 2003	10 May 2005	Conservative	Howard
George Osborne		10 May 2005	11 May 2010	Conservative	Howard
George Osborne		10 May 2005	11 May 2010	Conservative	Cameron
Alistair Darling		11 May 2010	8 October 2010	Labour	Harman I
Alan Johnson		8 October 2010	20 January 2011	Labour	Miliband
Ed Balls		20 January 2011	11 May 2015	Labour	Miliband
Chris Leslie		11 May 2015	12 September 2015	Labour	Harman II
John McDonnell		13 September 2015	5 April 2020	Labour	Corbyn
Anneliese Dodds		5 April 2020	9 May 2021	Labour	Starmer
Rachel Reeves		9 May 2021	5 July 2024	Labour	Starmer
Jeremy Hunt		8 July 2024	4 November 2024	Conservative	Sunak
Mel Stride		4 November 2024	31 August 2026	Conservative	Badenoch
Andrew Griffith		31 August 2026	Incumbent	Conservative	Badenoch
