= 1995 Labour Party Shadow Cabinet election =

British election

Elections to the Labour Party's Shadow Cabinet took place in October 1995, at the beginning of the 1995/6 session of parliament. Under the rules then in effect, the Commons members of the Parliamentary Labour Party elected 19 members of the Official Opposition Shadow Cabinet, who were then assigned portfolios by the leader. The Labour peers elected the Leader of the Opposition in the House of Lords. In addition, the Leader of the Labour Party and Deputy Leader (Tony Blair and John Prescott, respectively) were members by virtue of those offices. With this election, for the first time, the role Opposition Chief Whip was simply another portfolio to be handed out rather than an office separately elected by the PLP. The 19 elected members of the Shadow Cabinet were the ones with the largest number of votes. MPs were required to vote for at least four women, but women were not necessarily guaranteed places in the Shadow Cabinet.

| Colour key | Retained in the Shadow Cabinet |
| Colour key | Joined the Shadow Cabinet |
| Colour key | Voted out of the Shadow Cabinet |

| Rank | Candidate | Constituency | Votes |
|---|---|---|---|
| 1 | Margaret Beckett | Derby South | 187 |
| 2 | Robin Cook | Livingston | 181 |
| 3 | Gordon Brown | Dunfermline East | 159 |
| 4 | Ron Davies | Caerphilly | 157 |
| 5 | Donald Dewar | Glasgow Garscadden | 156 |
| 6 | Mo Mowlam | Redcar | 152 |
| 7 | Chris Smith | Islington South and Finsbury | 148 |
| 8 | Frank Dobson | Holborn and St Pancras | 142 |
| 9 | David Clark | South Shields | 141 |
| 10 | Ann Taylor | Dewsbury | 138 |
| 11 | David Blunkett | Sheffield Brightside | 132 |
| 12 | Gavin Strang | Edinburgh East | 131 |
| 13 | Jack Straw | Blackburn | 128 |
| 14 | Joan Lestor | Eccles | 122 |
| 15 | Michael Meacher | Oldham West | 121 |
| 16 | Clare Short | Birmingham Ladywood | 119 |
| 17 | George Robertson | Hamilton | 116 |
| 18 | Harriet Harman | Peckham | 108 |
| 19 | Tom Clarke | Monklands West | 107 |
| 20 | Jack Cunningham | Copeland | 100 |
| 21 | Tony Lloyd | Stretford | 99 |
| 22 | Derek Fatchett | Leeds Central | 90 |
| 23† | Joyce Quin | Gateshead East | 88 |
| 23† | Brian Wilson | Cunninghame North | 88 |
| 25 | Dawn Primarolo | Bristol South | 86 |
| 26 | Nick Brown | Newcastle-upon-Tyne North | 84 |
| 27 | Stuart Bell | Middlesbrough | 82 |
| 28 | Hilary Armstrong | North West Durham | 80 |
| 29 | John Marek | Wrexham | 76 |
| 30 | Ann Clwyd | Cynon Valley | 72 |
| 31 | Irene Adams | Paisley North | 71 |
| 32† | Alun Michael | Cardiff West | 69 |
| 32† | Chris Mullin | Sunderland South | 69 |
| 34 | Alistair Darling | Edinburgh Central | 67 |
| 35 | Richard Caborn | Sheffield Central | 65 |
| 36 | Llin Golding | Newcastle-under-Lyme | 64 |
| 37 | Henry McLeish | Central Fife | 50 |
| 38 | George Foulkes | Carrick, Cumnock and Doon Valley | 47 |
| 39 | Ian McCartney | Makerfield | 46 |
| 40 | Tony Banks | Newham North West | 41 |
| 41 | Peter Kilfoyle | Liverpool Walton | 40 |
| 42 | Kevin Barron | Rother Valley | 30 |

† Multiple candidates tied for position.
