= Harriet Harman =

British politician (born 1950)

The Right Honourable The Baroness Harman PC KC
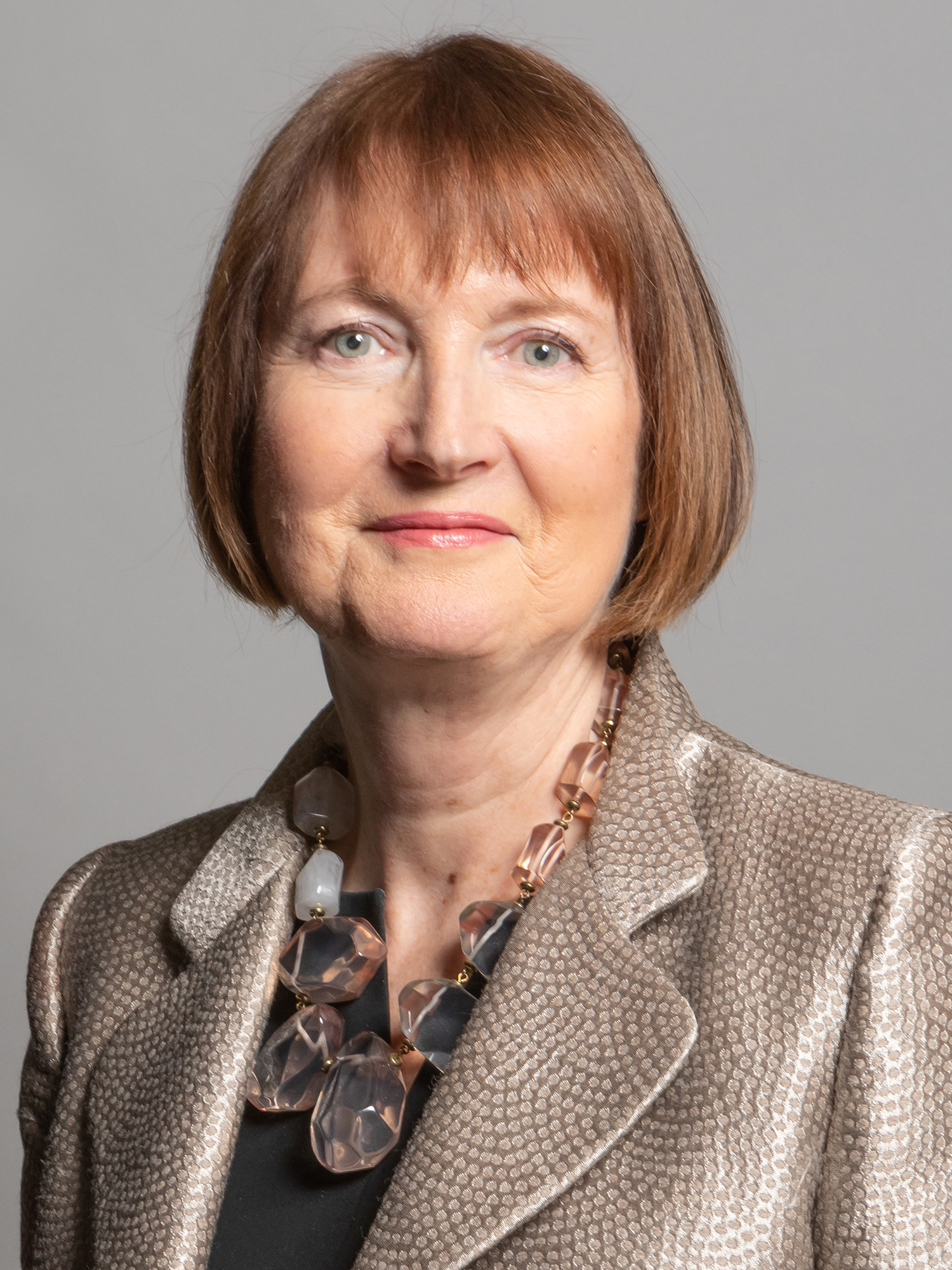
- Official portrait, 2020

Leader of the Opposition
- In office 8 May 2015 – 12 September 2015
- Monarch: Elizabeth II
- Prime Minister: David Cameron
- Shadow First Secretary: Hilary Benn (acting)
- Preceded by: Ed Miliband
- Succeeded by: Jeremy Corbyn
- In office 11 May 2010 – 25 September 2010
- Monarch: Elizabeth II
- Prime Minister: David Cameron
- Deputy: Jack Straw (acting)
- Preceded by: David Cameron
- Succeeded by: Ed Miliband

Deputy Leader of the Labour Party
- In office 24 June 2007 – 12 September 2015
- Leader: Gordon Brown; Ed Miliband
- Preceded by: John Prescott
- Succeeded by: Tom Watson

Leader of the House of Commons Lord Keeper of the Privy Seal
- In office 28 June 2007 – 11 May 2010
- Prime Minister: Gordon Brown
- Preceded by: Jack Straw
- Succeeded by: George Young

Secretary of State for Social Security
- In office 3 May 1997 – 27 July 1998
- Prime Minister: Tony Blair
- Preceded by: Peter Lilley
- Succeeded by: Alistair Darling
Junior ministerial offices
Minister for Women and Equality (Note: Women (1997–1998))
In office 28 June 2007 – 11 May 2010
Prime Minister	Gordon Brown
Preceded by	Ruth Kelly
Succeeded by	Theresa May
In office 3 May 1997 – 27 July 1998
Prime Minister	Tony Blair
Preceded by	Office established
Succeeded by	The Baroness Jay of Paddington
Minister of State for Justice (Note: Constitutional Affairs (2005–2007))
In office 10 May 2005 – 28 June 2007
Prime Minister	Tony Blair
Preceded by	Office established
Succeeded by	Michael Wills
Solicitor General for England and Wales
In office 11 June 2001 – 10 May 2005
Prime Minister	Tony Blair
Preceded by	Ross Cranston
Succeeded by	Mike O'Brien
Further offices held
Shadow cabinet portfolios
2010-2015	Deputy Prime Minister
2011–2015	Culture, Media and Sport
2007–2015	Party Chair
2010–2011	International Development
1996–1997	Social Security
1995–1996	Health
1994–1995	Employment
1992–1994	Chief Secretary to the Treasury
Committee chairmanships
2022–2024	Commons Privileges
2023–2024	Commons Standards
2015–2024 (Note: Out of office during these dates: 3 May 2017 – 1 November 2017 6 November 2019 – 4 March 2020 21 July 2022 – 23 June 2023)	Joint Human Rights

Member of the House of Lords
- Lord Temporal
- Life peerage 19 August 2024

Member of Parliament for Camberwell and Peckham Peckham (1982–1997)
- In office 28 October 1982 – 30 May 2024
- Preceded by: Harry Lamborn
- Succeeded by: Miatta Fahnbulleh

United Kingdom Special Envoy on Women and Girls
- Incumbent
- Assumed office 8 March 2025
- Appointed by: David Lammy
- Prime Minister: Sir Keir Starmer; Andy Burnham
- Preceded by: Office established

Prime Minister's Adviser on Women and Girls
- Incumbent
- Assumed office 9 May 2026
- Prime Minister: Sir Keir Starmer; Andy Burnham

Personal details
- Born: Harriet Ruth Harman; 30 July 1950 (age 76) Marylebone, London, England
- Party: Labour
- Spouse: Jack Dromey (m. 1982; died 2022)
- Children: 3
- Parent(s): John B. Harman; Anna Spicer
- Relatives: See list: Joseph Chamberlain (great-granduncle); Richard Chamberlain (great-granduncle); Beatrice Chamberlain (first cousin twice removed); Austen Chamberlain (first cousin twice removed); Neville Chamberlain (first cousin twice removed); Ida Chamberlain (first cousin twice removed); Hilda Chamberlain (first cousin twice removed)
- Education: Goodricke College, York (BA)
- Website: www.harrietharman.org

Harriet Ruth Harman, Baroness Harman (born 30 July 1950) is a British politician and solicitor who served as Deputy Leader of the Labour Party and Chair of the Labour Party from 2007 to 2015 and Leader of the House of Commons and Lord Keeper of the Privy Seal from 2007 to 2010. She also briefly served as Leader of the Opposition in 2010 and 2015 following the resignations of Gordon Brown and Ed Miliband respectively. She was Member of Parliament (MP) for Camberwell and Peckham (formerly Peckham) from 1982 to 2024, during which time she held various Cabinet and Shadow Cabinet positions, and was appointed to the House of Lords as a life peer in 2024.

Born in London to a doctor and a barrister, Harman was privately educated at St Paul's Girls' School before going on to study politics at the University of York. After working for Brent Law Centre, she became a legal officer for the National Council for Civil Liberties (NCCL), a role in which she was found in contempt of court following action pursued by Michael Havers, a former Attorney General. She successfully took a case, Harman v United Kingdom, to the European Commission of Human Rights, where she argued that Havers had breached her right to freedom of expression. The case was settled after the British government agreed to change the law.

Harman was elected as MP for Peckham at a 1982 by-election. She was made a shadow social services minister in 1984 and a shadow health minister in 1987. Under John Smith, she was Shadow Chief Secretary to the Treasury and, under Tony Blair, as Shadow Employment Secretary, Shadow Health Secretary and Shadow Social Security Secretary respectively. Following the 1997 general election victory, she was appointed Secretary of State for Social Security and the first ever Minister for Women, until 1998 when she left the Cabinet. In 2001, she was appointed Solicitor General for England and Wales, until 2005 when she became Minister of State for Constitutional Affairs. She ran in the 2007 deputy leadership election and defeated five other candidates, ultimately defeating health secretary Alan Johnson, by a narrow margin. Gordon Brown, who was elected as party leader, appointed her Leader of the House of Commons, Lord Privy Seal, Minister for Women and Equality and Chair of the Labour Party.

Upon defeat at the 2010 general election, Brown resigned as party leader and Harman, as Deputy Leader of the Labour Party, became the acting leader of the Labour Party and Leader of the Opposition until the election of Ed Miliband. She subsequently served as Shadow Deputy Prime Minister, combining the position with that of Shadow Secretary of State for International Development from 2010 to 2011 and then Shadow Secretary of State for Culture, Media and Sport from 2011 to 2015. In 2014, Harman expressed regret after it was revealed that the Paedophile Information Exchange had affiliated status within the NCCL while she had been legal officer. Following Labour's defeat at the 2015 general election, Miliband resigned as Leader of the Labour Party and Harman again became acting party leader and Leader of the Opposition. She also resigned as deputy leader, prompting a concurrent deputy leadership election. Harman stood down as an MP at the 2024 general election and was appointed to the House of Lords later that year. She was appointed Chair of The Fawcett Society in 2023.

== Early life and career ==
Harriet Ruth Harman was born in London and was privately educated at St Paul's Girls' School. She is one of the four daughters of John B. Harman, a Harley Street doctor, and his wife Anna née Spicer, a barrister, who gave up practising when she had children and who was the Liberal Party candidate for Hertford in the 1964 general election.

Both of Harman's parents had non-conformist backgrounds – her paternal grandfather Nathaniel Bishop Harman, an ophthalmic surgeon, was a prominent Unitarian and the Spicer family were well-known Congregationalists. Her paternal aunt was Elizabeth Longford (née Harman), the wife of former Labour minister Frank Pakenham, 7th Earl of Longford, and her cousins include the writers Lady Antonia Fraser, Lady Rachel Billington and Thomas Pakenham, Earl of Longford. Her great-grandfather was Arthur Chamberlain, an industrialist. Harman is a great-great-niece of the Liberal statesman Joseph Chamberlain, and is a cousin once removed of former prime minister Neville Chamberlain and former Foreign Secretary Austen Chamberlain. She is also related to Liberal politician Richard Chamberlain, MP. Through her uncle Lord Pakenham she is related by marriage to former prime minister David Cameron, whom she faced as Leader of the Opposition. Her cousin Rachel Billington is also godmother to former prime minister Boris Johnson.

Harman gained a 2:1 BA in Politics from the University of York, graduating in 1972. During her time at York, she was a member of Goodricke College and was involved with student politics. After York, Harman went on to qualify as a solicitor and volunteered at the Fulham Legal Advice Centre. She worked for Brent Law Centre in London from 1974.

Between 1978 and 1982, Harman was employed as a legal officer for the National Council for Civil Liberties (NCCL). In this capacity, and just before becoming MP for Peckham in a by-election in 1982, she represented a prisoner who was kept in solitary confinement in HM Hull Prison, in a civil action against the Home Office. However, she was found in contempt of court for sharing documents she had read aloud in the courtroom with a journalist. The contempt of court action was pursued by Michael Havers, a former Attorney General for England and Wales. Harman was thus the subject of parliamentary questions and debates shortly before she was elected as an MP, including at a Prime Minister's Questions (PMQ) in February 1982. Harman appealed the action at the Court of Appeal, but this was rejected. She subsequently took the case to the European Court of Human Rights (ECtHR) in Strasbourg, successfully arguing that Havers had breached her right to freedom of expression. The case is considered a significant case in British public law.

Harman was later involved in a European Court of Human Rights case against the British domestic intelligence agency MI5. During a 1984 television interview by Cathy Massiter, it was revealed personal files were held by MI5 on Harman and on the (by then former) General Secretary of the NCCL, Patricia Hewitt. They successfully argued that there had been an infringement of their rights, because MI5 was not a legally constituted and democratically accountable organisation, this being the minimum standard in democracy. The success of the case led to enactment of the Security Service Act 1989.

While working for the NCCL, Harman also wrote the pamphlet Sex Discrimination in School: How to fight it (1979).

== Opposition Member of Parliament ==
=== 1982 by-election ===
Harry Lamborn, the Labour Member of Parliament for Peckham, died on 21 August 1982. Harman contested for the vacant seat at the subsequent by-election, while five months pregnant. On 28 October 1982, Harman was elected to succeed Lamborn with 11,349 votes (50.34%), a majority of 3,931 over Social Democratic candidate Dick Taverne, a former Labour MP for Lincoln. The Conservative Party candidate was John Redwood, who came third, and went on to be elected MP for Wokingham in 1987. Harman was one of the 11 women Labour MPs in Parliament after her election and has said of her entry to Parliament that "I was 32 when the average age of MPs was towards the 60s, and I was pregnant as well. I was a fish out of water."

=== 1983 general election ===
Harman was re-elected for Peckham at the 1983 general election, improving her majority to +2.9%. In 1984, Harman became a Shadow Social Services minister, then served as a Shadow Health minister in 1987. In late 1988, Harman was absent from the Commons for some time and on 26 December it was reported that she was suffering pneumonia brought on by psittacosis.

In 1990, Harman, Anna Coote and Patricia Hewitt released the publication The Family Way: A New Approach to Policy-Making with think tank the Institute for Public Policy Research.

=== 1992 general election ===
Following re-election for Peckham at the 1992 general election, Harman entered the Shadow Cabinet as Shadow Chief Secretary to the Treasury (1992–1994) and later served as Shadow Employment Secretary (1994–1995), Shadow Health Secretary (1995–1996) and Shadow Social Security Secretary (1996–1997).

== Labour in Government ==
=== Under Tony Blair ===
At the 1997 general election, the constituency of Peckham was abolished and was replaced by the new constituency of Camberwell and Peckham. Harman was elected as MP for the new constituency and, following Labour's landslide general election victory, she was appointed to Blair's cabinet as Secretary of State for Social Security and the first ever Minister for Women. She campaigned for the passing of Human Rights Act 1998, which enshrined the European Convention on Human Rights in British domestic legislation.

In 2000, Harman and Deborah Mattinson published the pamphlet Winning for Women with the Fabian Society. The pamphlet outlined a 15-point action plan for Labour to make itself "the natural choice for women voters", with policies including increased maternity pay and leave and help with childcare.

Under Blair, Harman was given the task of reforming the Welfare State. During this time, her more notable policies included introducing a minimum income guarantee and winter fuel payments for the elderly. It was later ruled that the fuel payments policy breached European sex discrimination laws in that men had to wait five years longer to receive them than women. The policy was amended so both sexes qualified at age 60. Harman also announced a review of pension provision, with the aim of helping low-paid workers and women, and campaigned for improvements for childcare, family-friendly working hours and for changes to the Labour party rule book.

Harman headed up New Labour's controversial cut to single parent benefit despite the majority of those affected being women. There was public outcry at this perceived attacked on the living standards of some of the poorest women and children. According to The Independent, a group of women protesters shouted "Labour scum" as the measure was approved in Parliament – albeit with a rebellion of 47 Labour MPs and the abstention of many others. Harman was sacked from the position in 1998. According to many in the media, this was the result of a series of public rows with junior minister Frank Field, though others also cited her decision to cut benefits to lone parents as a factor. Harman voted with the party on all but a few instances during its period in government.

Harman made a return to the front bench following the 2001 general election, with her appointment to the office of Solicitor General, thus becoming the first female Solicitor General. In accordance with convention, she was appointed as a practicing Queen's Counsel (QC), although she had previously had no rights of audience in the higher courts, did not obtain them and never presented a case during her time as Solicitor General.

After successfully contesting the 2005 general election, Harman was appointed a Minister of State in the Department for Constitutional Affairs, with responsibilities including constitutional reform, legal aid and court processes. She represented Lord Falconer in the House of Commons on the frontbench.

On 16 March 2006, Harman relinquished her ministerial responsibilities for electoral administration and reform of the House of Lords. She stated that this was to avoid any potential conflict of interest after her husband Jack Dromey, the Treasurer of the Labour Party, announced that he would be investigating a number of loans made to the Labour Party that had not been disclosed to party officers. She retained her other responsibilities.

Also in 2006, Harman argued that Labour needed to appeal to and recruit young people to the party.

==== Deputy Leadership election ====
In 2007, Harman announced her intention to stand for Deputy Leadership of the Labour Party when John Prescott stood down. She commissioned an opinion poll which found that she would be the most electorally popular potential deputy leader, a point she used in her campaign. Other candidates for the position of Deputy Leader were Education Secretary Alan Johnson, International Development Secretary Hilary Benn, Labour chairwoman Hazel Blears, backbencher Jon Cruddas and Northern Ireland Secretary Peter Hain.

While Harman had supported the Iraq War, but during the Deputy Leadership campaign she said that she would not have done so had she known about the lack of concrete evidence of weapons of mass destruction. She also suggested that Labour members wanted a change of emphasis in government policy.

Harman did not have the support of any major trade unions, and helped to fund her campaign by taking out a personal loan of £10,000 and a £40,000 extension to her mortgage. Harman did not report some donations and loans on time, and was subject to an Electoral Commission inquiry for breaches of electoral law. The commission said that her "failure to report on time is a serious matter" though the case was not handed over to the police.

On 24 June 2007, in a close contest Harman was elected Deputy Leader. Johnson had led in all but the first of the previous rounds, but when second-preference votes had been redistributed after the fourth round, Harman as elected with 50.43% of the vote to Johnson's 49.56%, with more of Cruddas' supporters putting her as second choice. She told the BBC: "It was a close race, but I'm delighted to have won it."

==== Campaign donations ====
In November 2007, it emerged that property developer David Abrahams' secretary Janet Kidd had donated £5,000 to Harman's successful deputy leadership bid. After an investigation by The Mail on Sunday newspaper into other donations made by people associated with Abrahams, and Prime Minister Gordon Brown's assertion that all such monies would be returned, Harman issued a statement saying she accepted the donation on 4 July "in good faith", had registered the monies with the Electoral Commission and the Register of Members' Interests, and that she "was not aware of any funding arrangements... between David Abrahams and Janet Kidd".

=== Under Gordon Brown ===
Harman was known as a long-term supporter of Gordon Brown and was regarded as both a personal friend and close colleague. On 28 June 2007, after she became Deputy Leader of the Labour Party and Brown was appointed prime minister, Harman joined Brown's Cabinet as Leader of the House of Commons, Lord Privy Seal and Minister for Women and Equality. She was also Chairman of the Labour Party, but unlike the previous Deputy Leader, John Prescott, Harman was not made Deputy Prime Minister.

When Harman, as Leader of the House of Commons, stood in for Gordon Brown during Prime Minister's Questions on Wednesday 2 April 2008 (due to the Prime Minister attending a NATO summit in Romania), she became the first female Labour Minister to take Prime Minister's Questions. She subsequently repeated this during Brown's absences.

Harman attacked the Conservative Party at the 2007 Labour Party Conference, referring to them as the "nasty party" and suggesting that there would be little competition at the next election.

On 1 April 2008 the Daily Mail reported that Harman had decided to wear a kevlar-reinforced stab vest while touring her Peckham constituency under police guard. On 2 April The Guardian relayed information from the Metropolitan Police that "the type of Met Vest she wore over her jacket protected her from knife attacks and bullets, and, for her at least, was optional". Harman compared the decision to wearing a hard hat while touring a building site, which led the BBC's John Humphrys to respond, during an interview for BBC Radio 4, "You wear a hard hat on a building site because... there is the danger that something might drop on your head. You don't need to wear a bullet-proof vest on the streets of London, do you!" Harman told the BBC that the neighbourhood police team she was with put on their stab vests and gave her one to wear as well.

In April 2008, Harman's blog was hacked and changed to state that she had joined the Conservative Party. Harman later admitted when questioned by Sky News that the incident was a result of her using "Harriet" and "Harman" as her username and password. The hacker was Conservative Kemi Badenoch, who was elected as MP for Saffron Walden in 2017 and as Leader of the Conservative Party in 2024. Badenoch confessed to the hacking in an April 2018 interview with Core Politics and later offered Harman an apology, which she accepted.

=== Use of statistics ===
During the late-2000s recession, and following a government report which suggested that women were twice as likely to lose their jobs as men and feared losing their jobs more than men, Harman stated: "We will not allow women to become the victims of this recession". However, some statistics contradicted her position, including the Office for National Statistics (ONS) report on the issue which stated "the economic downturn in 2008 has impacted less on women in employment than men". According to the ONS, men were losing their jobs at twice the rate of women. The Government Equalities Office insisted the ONS figures did not render pointless its efforts to help women.

In June 2009, Sir Michael Scholar, head of the UK Statistics Authority, wrote to Harman to warn her that different headline figures used by the ONS and Government Equalities Office with regards to pay differentiation between men and women might undermine public trust in official statistics. The GEO's headline figure was 23%, which was based on median hourly earnings of all employees, not the 12.8%, based on median hourly earnings of full-time employees only, used by the ONS. Scholar wrote: "It is the Statistics Authority's view that use of the 23% on its own, without qualification, risks giving a misleading quantification of the gender pay gap".

=== Expenses ===
In January 2009, Harman proposed a rule change to exempt MPs' expenses from the Freedom of Information Act. Her parliamentary order aimed to remove "most expenditure information held by either House of Parliament from the scope of the Freedom of Information Act". It meant that, under the law, journalists and members of the public would no longer be entitled to learn details of their MP's expenses. Labour MPs were to be pressured to vote for this measure by use of a three line whip. Her proposal was withdrawn when the Conservative Party said they would vote against, and in light of an online campaign by mySociety. The failure of the motion led to the disclosure of expenses of British members of parliament.

In December 2010, it emerged that Harman was amongst 40 MPs who had secretly repaid wrongly claimed expenses between 2008 and 2010. In November 2010, Harman's parliamentary private secretary Ian Lavery had blocked a motion designed to allow the repayments to be made public.

=== Human Fertilisation and Embryology Act 2008 ===
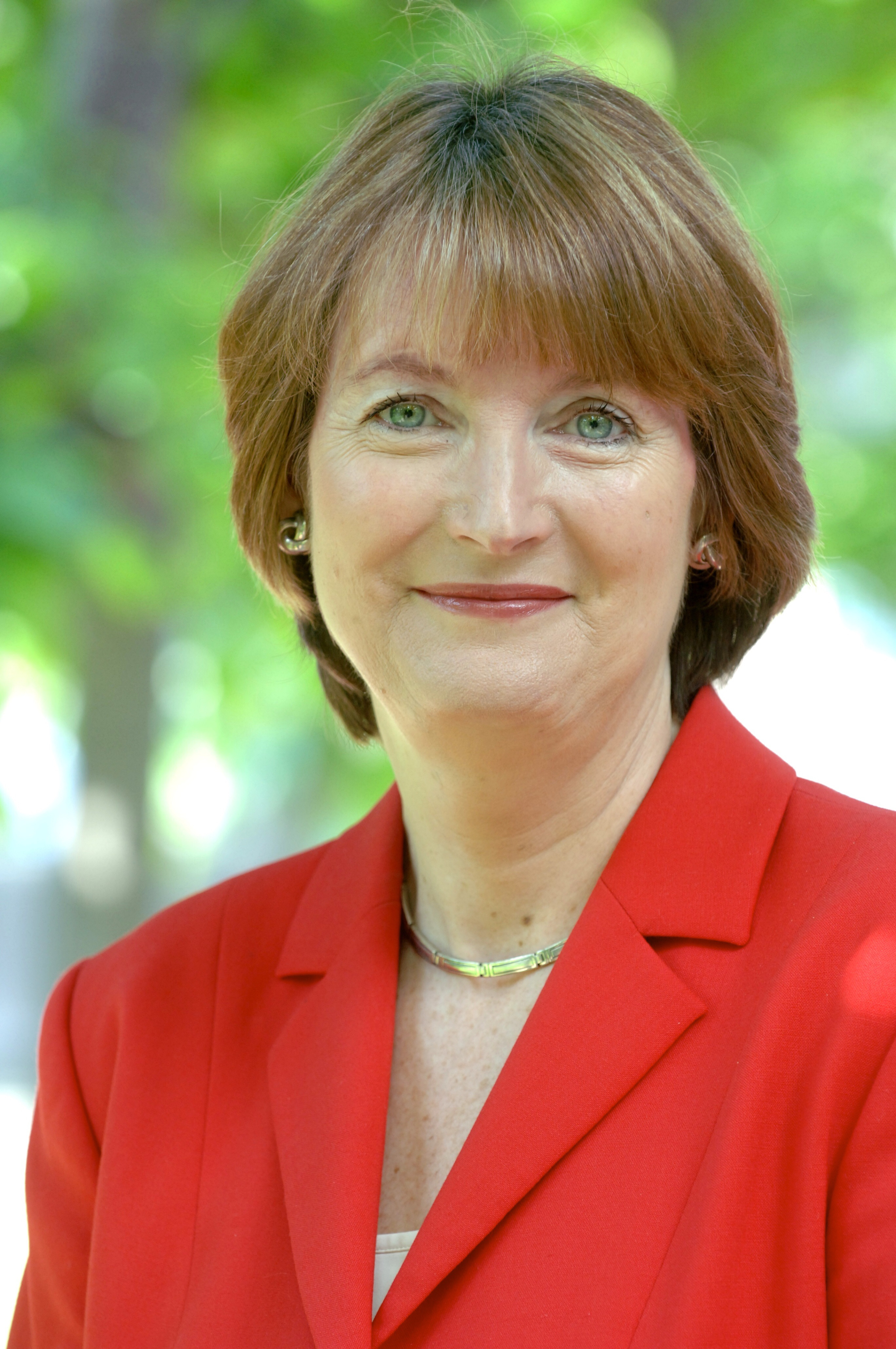
Harman in 2007

Harman allegedly blocked a series of votes to liberalise Britain's abortion laws via the Human Fertilisation and Embryology Bill (now Act). The pro-choice amendments proposed by Diane Abbott MP, Katy Clark MP and John McDonnell MP included NC30 Amendment of the Abortion Act 1967: Application to Northern Ireland. It was reported that the Labour Government at the time asked MPs not to table these pro-choice amendments (and at least until Third Reading) and then allegedly used parliamentary mechanisms in order to prevent a vote accordingly.

=== Equality Bill ===
In 2010, Harman introduced a proposed Equality Bill to Parliament. Polly Toynbee wrote that it was "Labour's biggest idea for 11 years. A public-sector duty to close the gap between rich and poor will tackle the class divide in a way that no other policy has... This new duty to narrow the gap would permeate every aspect of government policy. Its possible ramifications are mind-bogglingly immense."

As part of the proposed Bill, Harman announced a consultation on changing the existing discrimination laws, including options for reverse discrimination in employment. Under the proposals, employers would be legally allowed to discriminate in favour of a job candidate on the basis of their race or gender where the candidates were otherwise equally qualified. Employers would not be required to use these powers, but would be able to do so without the threat of legal action for discriminatory practices. The white paper also proposed measures to end age discrimination, promote transparency in organisations and introduce a new equality duty on the public sector. It was argued by critics that these changes could face a challenge under Article 14 of the European Convention on Human Rights (ECHR), which prohibits discrimination on the basis of sex, race, colour, language, religion and on several other criteria. Michael Millar, writing in The Spectator, was of the opinion that "the Equality Bill before parliament today gives employers the right to choose an ethnic minority candidate or female candidate over a white male, specifically because they are an ethnic minority or female."

Harman also commissioned Operation Black Vote (OBV) to prepare a report on allowing political parties to draw up all-black shortlists. This was designed to increase the number of black and minority ethnic (BME) MPs in Westminster. A further report proposed extended the arrangement allowing all-women shortlists beyond 2015. These proposals were supported by members of the three major parties, though no others allowed measures to promote the candidacies of under-represented minorities in their shortlists. Inside the Labour Party, Harman said she does "not agree with all-male leaderships" because men "cannot be left to run things on their own"; and that, consequently, one of Labour's top two posts should always be held by a woman.

The Bill was passed into law as the Equality Act 2010, replacing previous legislation, including the Equal Pay Act 1970, Sex Discrimination Act 1975, Race Relations Act 1976, Disability Discrimination Act 1995, Employment Equality (Religion or Belief) Regulations 2003, Employment Equality (Sexual Orientation) Regulations 2003 and the Employment Equality (Age) Regulations 2006.

== Return to Opposition ==
At the 2010 general election, Harman was re-elected to her seat for Camberwell and Peckham, with a 59.2% share of the vote. Following the resignation of Gordon Brown as Prime Minister and Leader of the Labour Party on 11 May 2010, Harman automatically became the temporary leader of the party as well as the Leader of the Opposition, entitling her to the salary and government car that come with the role. Although she was informally described in the media as "Acting" Leader, she was fully Leader by the terms of the party's constitution, albeit on a temporary basis, as was the case with Margaret Beckett in 1994. Harman announced that she would remain Deputy Leader rather than standing for election as Leader, stating that you can't run for leader at the same time as being deputy leader".

Harman nominated Diane Abbott, MP for Hackney North and Stoke Newington, to prevent the election from being all male. But she nonetheless asserted her intention to remain neutral throughout the contest and said, "This is a very crucial period and we have got five fantastic candidates. All of them would make excellent leaders of the party."

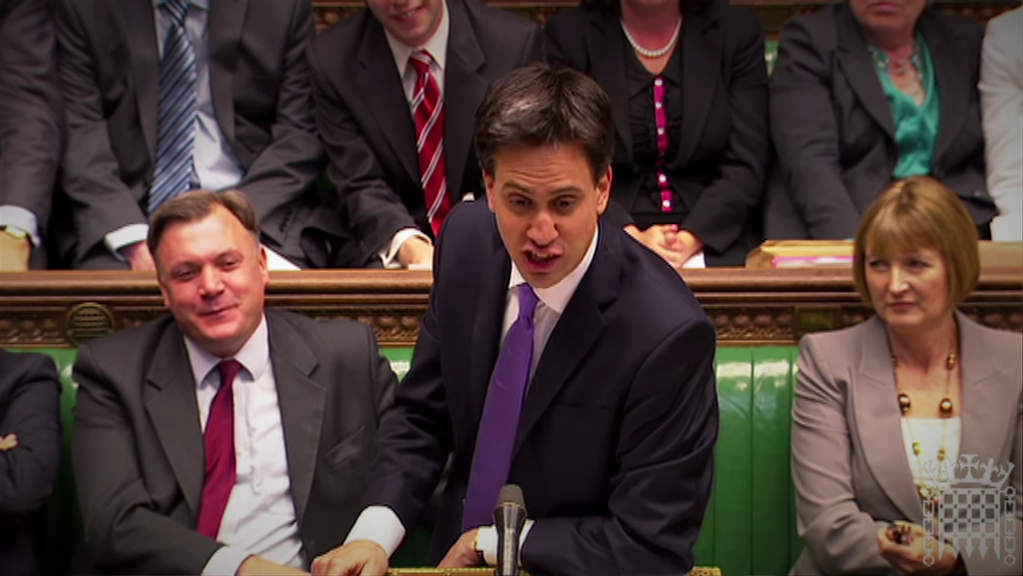
Harman on the Labour front bench with Ed Balls and Ed Miliband during PMQs in 2012

Following Ed Miliband's election as Leader of the Labour Party, Harman returned to her role as Deputy Leader, shadowing Nick Clegg as Deputy Prime Minister and with the title of Deputy Leader of the Opposition.

In September 2010, as Deputy Leader Harman addressed the Trade Unions Congress (TUC). She stepped down as Deputy Leader of the Labour Party later that month. When Miliband assigned portfolios on 8 October 2010, he appointed her Shadow Secretary of State for International Development.

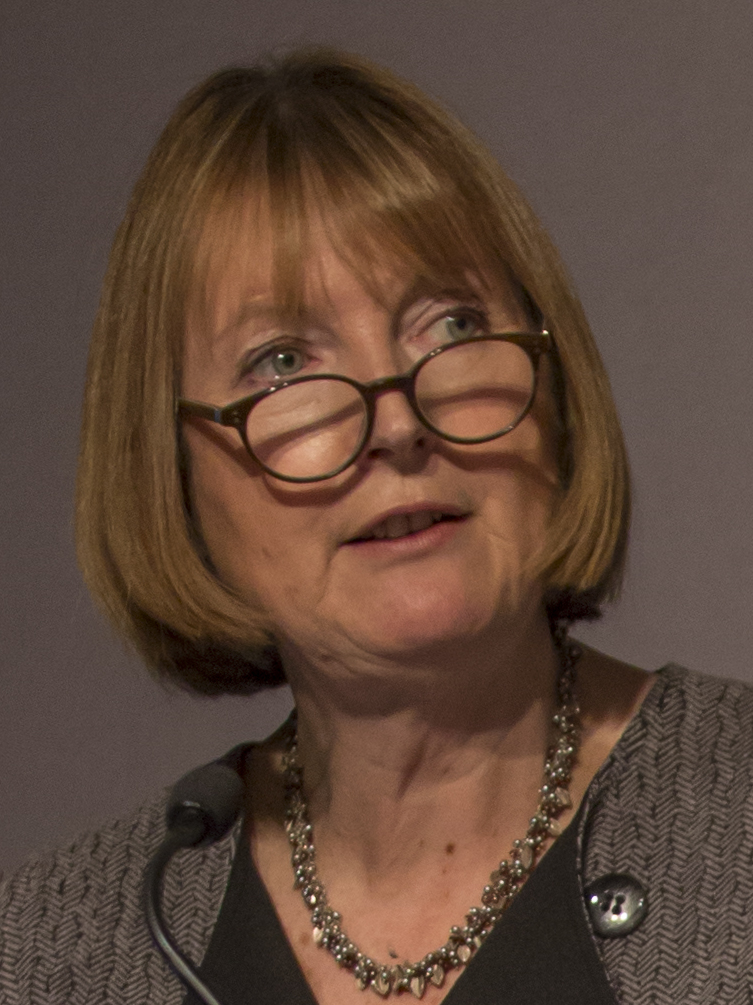
Harman at the Salford International Media Festival in 2014

In 2011, Harman was appointed as Shadow Secretary of State for Culture, Media and Sport. While in post, in February 2013 she wrote to British broadcasters, asking for more older women be employed to fight against the "combination of ageism and sexism" that they faced. In October 2013, she gave evidence to the House of Lords Communications Committee on media plurality. In June 2014, she urged publicly funded arts organisations to make a greater effort to be inclusive during a launch of a Labour consultation document on young people and the arts. Harman also spoke out against The Sun tabloid newspaper featuring topless women on the third page, known as Page 3, saying that she had "disapproved of it since the 1970s". This led to The Sun saying that it would not back Labour at the next election and calling Harman a "feminist fanatic", before the feature was dropped.

In September 2013, Harman addressed a TUC event in Bournemouth, urging trade unions not to break their historic links with the Labour Party.

In 2010, Harman referred to Danny Alexander as a "ginger rodent" in a speech to the Scottish Labour Party conference in Oban. This was greeted with cheers and laughter from the conference, but the Liberal Democrats and the Scottish National Party described them as gingerism and "anti-Scottish". Harman apologised for the offence caused. On 4 December 2014, Harman accused Nick Clegg of turning into a Tory during Prime Minister's Questions.

=== Paedophilia support allegations and age of consent scandal ===
In March 2014, an article from the Daily Mail exposed that a 1979 letter from paedophile group supporter contained Harman's initials. Harman denied allegations that she had supported the Paedophile Information Exchange (PIE) when the advocacy group was affiliated with the pressure group Liberty, while she was Liberty's Legal Officer from 1978 to 1982. Both the Daily Mail and The Daily Telegraph also claimed that Jack Dromey MP (her partner) and former Health Secretary Patricia Hewitt had offered support to apologists for the sexual abuse of children while they were working for NCCL. The Guardian also stated that in an NCCL briefing note dated 1978, Harman urged amendments to the 1978 Child Protection Bill declaring that "images of children should only be considered pornographic if it could be proven the subject suffered", which Harman said was an argument intended to protect from "unintended consequences" such as parents being prosecuted for taking pictures of their children on the beach or in the bath.

In a television interview, Harman said she had "nothing to apologise for", stating: "I very much regret that this vile organisation, PIE, ever existed and that it ever had anything to do with NCCL, but it did not affect my work at NCCL." Harman stated that while she did support the equalisation of the age of consent for gay men she had never campaigned for the age of consent to go below the age of 16 and accused the Daily Mail of trying to make her "guilty by way of association". Ed Miliband backed Harman and stated that she had "huge decency and integrity".

=== 2015 general election and acting leader of the Labour Party ===
During the 2015 general election, Harman led the Labour Woman to Woman campaign, which involved a pink battle bus visiting marginal constituencies to promote Labour's "women's manifesto". The women's manifesto focused on five areas the party identified as being important to female voters: childcare, social care, domestic violence, equal pay and political representation.

Harman was re-elected at the general election to her seat of Camberwell and Peckham, taking a 63.3% share of the vote. Following the poor overall election result and Ed Miliband stepping down as Leader of the Labour Party the day after the general election, Harman again became the acting leader of the Labour Party and Leader of the Opposition. She announced she would stand down from the role once a formal Labour Party leadership election had taken place.

While acting leader, Harman made the decision for Labour to abstain, rather than oppose, the Welfare Reform and Work Bill 2015, leading to 48 Labour MPs defying the whip. Harman also made the decision that Labour would vote for having a European Union membership referendum, reversing Labour's pre-election opposition to an EU referendum. In 2016, she wrote to Ofcom to complain that male politicians were being allowed to dominate the EU referendum debate, citing Labour analysis which found that men made up 83% of all politicians who appeared on the Today programme since the beginning of the year.

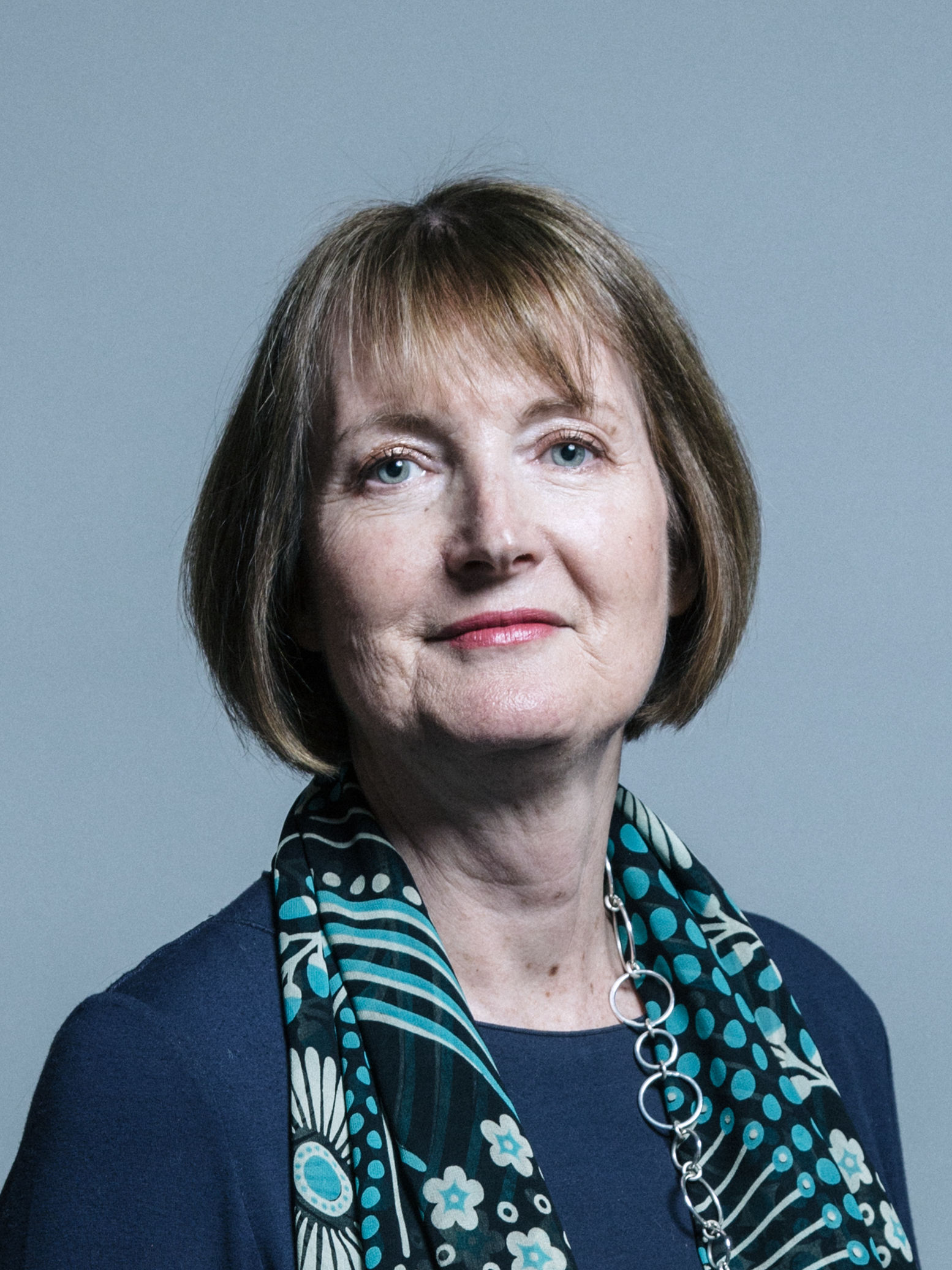
Harman in 2017

When she stepped down as interim leader, Harman had served twenty-eight years as a front bench MP. After standing down as acting leader, Harman became Chair of the Joint Committee on Human Rights in October 2015. As chair, she raised questions about the UK's gender pay gap to the Minister for Women, Victoria Atkins in, in April 2018 and called for political unity to stop abuse of female MPs.

=== Mother of the House ===
In 2016, Harman became the longest-ever continuously serving female MP in the House of Commons, surpassing Gwyneth Dunwoody's record. Harman was dubbed the "Mother of the House" by then Prime Minister Theresa May on 13 June 2017.

=== 2019 general election ===
Harman was re-elected to her seat at the 2019 general election, with a majority of 33,780.

On 10 September 2019, Harman announced that she would stand to be the next Speaker of the House of Commons, following the announcement by the current Speaker John Bercow of his intention to resign on 31 October 2019. She ran on a platform of "putting parliament back in touch with the public that it serves." She voluntarily withdrew from the vote after the second ballot, having the lowest votes of all of the surviving candidates in that round.

In November 2021, Harman unveiled a 10-point plan of proposed measures in the House of Commons that would allow UK musicians post-Brexit to tour Europe without the need for visas and work permits. The plans were backed by the Musicians' Union and UK Music.

In December 2021, Harman announced that she would be stepping down as an MP at the 2024 general election. She gave her final speech in Parliament in May 2024.

=== View on S&M ===
Harman supported an amendment to the Domestic Abuse Bill 2019 to implement the verdict of R v Brown. R v Brown revisited the conviction of the earlier Operation Spanner, in which five men were convicted of engaging in homosexual sadomasochistic practices with consensual partners. Operation Spanner occurred in the 1980s and had been since criticised for its attitudes towards homosexuality. R v Brown re-affirmed that adults cannot consent to actual bodily harm. The changes were intended to prevent use of the rough sex murder defence, believing people should be prosecuted for murder even if they did not intend to kill their partners. However, the bill was criticised as a "bad law" and "gesture politics" as it does not change the fact that intent to kill or inflict grievous bodily harm is required for a murder conviction.

Harman wrote to the Attorney General to complain about an unduly lenient sentence of a man whose partner died while engaging in erotic strangulation. The sentence had been reduced from seven years to four years eight months in light of the man's guilty plea and self-referral to the police.

=== Investigation into Boris Johnson ===
Harman chaired the Commons Select Privileges Committee of the House of Commons over the investigation into Boris Johnson's breach of lockdown rules during the COVID-19 pandemic, concerning four specific assertions made by the then Prime Minister Boris Johnson at Prime Minister's Questions about "the legality of activities in 10 Downing Street and the Cabinet Office under Covid regulations", events commonly referred to as "Partygate". The investigation was concerned with whether Johnson misled the Commons when he made these statements.

The Committee published their final report on 15 June. Johnson resigned over the investigation after having been sent a draft copy of the committee's report. The committee had voted on the final report text and unanimously supported it. They concluded that Johnson had deliberately misled the House, a contempt of Parliament. They said that, had he still been an MP, they would have recommended a 90-day suspension. If that had happened, it would have been the second longest suspension since 1949.

The Committee concluded that Johnson's actions were "more serious" because they were committed when he was prime minister. They noted that there was no precedent for a PM being found to have deliberately misled Parliament. The report stated that Johnson tried to "rewrite the meaning" of COVID rules "to fit his own evidence" for example that "a leaving gathering or a gathering to boost morale was a lawful reason to hold a gathering." They concluded he was guilty of further contempt of Parliament and that he breached confidentiality requirements by criticising the committee's provisional findings when he resigned. They said he was complicit in a "campaign of abuse" against those investigating him.

The Commons debated the report on 19 June 2023. Labour forced a vote and the Commons voted 354 to 7 in support, with a large number of abstentions. This was an absolute majority of the Commons. 118 Conservative MPs, including 15 ministers, voted for the report and 225 abstained. Then prime minister Rishi Sunak had earlier said he had other commitments, and did not attend the debate and refused to say how he would have voted.

Following inaccurate reporting by the press about concerning the committee's inquiry into the conduct of Johnson, Harman and Bernard Jenkin (a fellow member of the committee) published a joint article in The Times rebutting the inaccuracies and criticism.

== Later career ==
Harman is a committed feminist, having said, "I am in the Labour Party because I am a feminist. I am in the Labour Party because I believe in equality." She has worn a "This is what a feminist looks like" t-shirt at PMQs in 2014 and has been given nicknames in the press for her feminist views, such as "Harriet Harperson" and "Harriet the Harridan". She has said of the criticism: "Often if people are attacking you personally, it's because they can't deal with your argument."

In 2017, Harman's memoir A Woman's Work was published. The book is her personal examination of women's progressive politics over the last thirty years.

In June 2023, the gender equality and women's rights charity The Fawcett Society, announced that Harman had been appointed chair, at the conclusion of her work with the Privileges Committee inquiry into Boris Johnson. She succeeded Tanya Tunley.

Since 2024, Harman has co-presented the podcast, "Electoral Dysfunction" alongside Ruth Davidson and Beth Rigby.

In 2024, Harman deposited her personal papers to the Churchill Archives Centre.

In 2026, Harman took part in a TV series called The Wargame, hosted by Cathy Newman, in which members of the cast "reflect on the pressures of decision-making at the highest level and explore the wider questions raised from this thrilling documentary series".

== Peerage ==
After standing down as a Member of Parliament, Harman was nominated for a life peerage in the 2024 Dissolution Honours. She was created Baroness Harman, of Peckham in the London Borough of Southwark, on 19 August 2024.

In 2025, Harman proposed an amendment to Labour's bill to remove hereditary peers that would mandate the government to introduce proposals to remove the right for 26 Church of England bishops to sit in the Lords ex officio as Lords Spiritual. This amendment is in line with Labour's manifesto commitment to proceed with wider reforms of the upper chamber.

In November 2024, Harman was awarded a lifetime achievement award at the Next 100 Years' Inspirational Women In Law Awards.

== UK Special Envoy for Women and Girls ==
In 2024, Harman stated in a BBC interview that there must be "a fierce zero tolerance for sexual harassment and abuse" in Westminster and called for a women's caucus made up of female MPs from across the House to support alleged harassment victims when they make complaints.

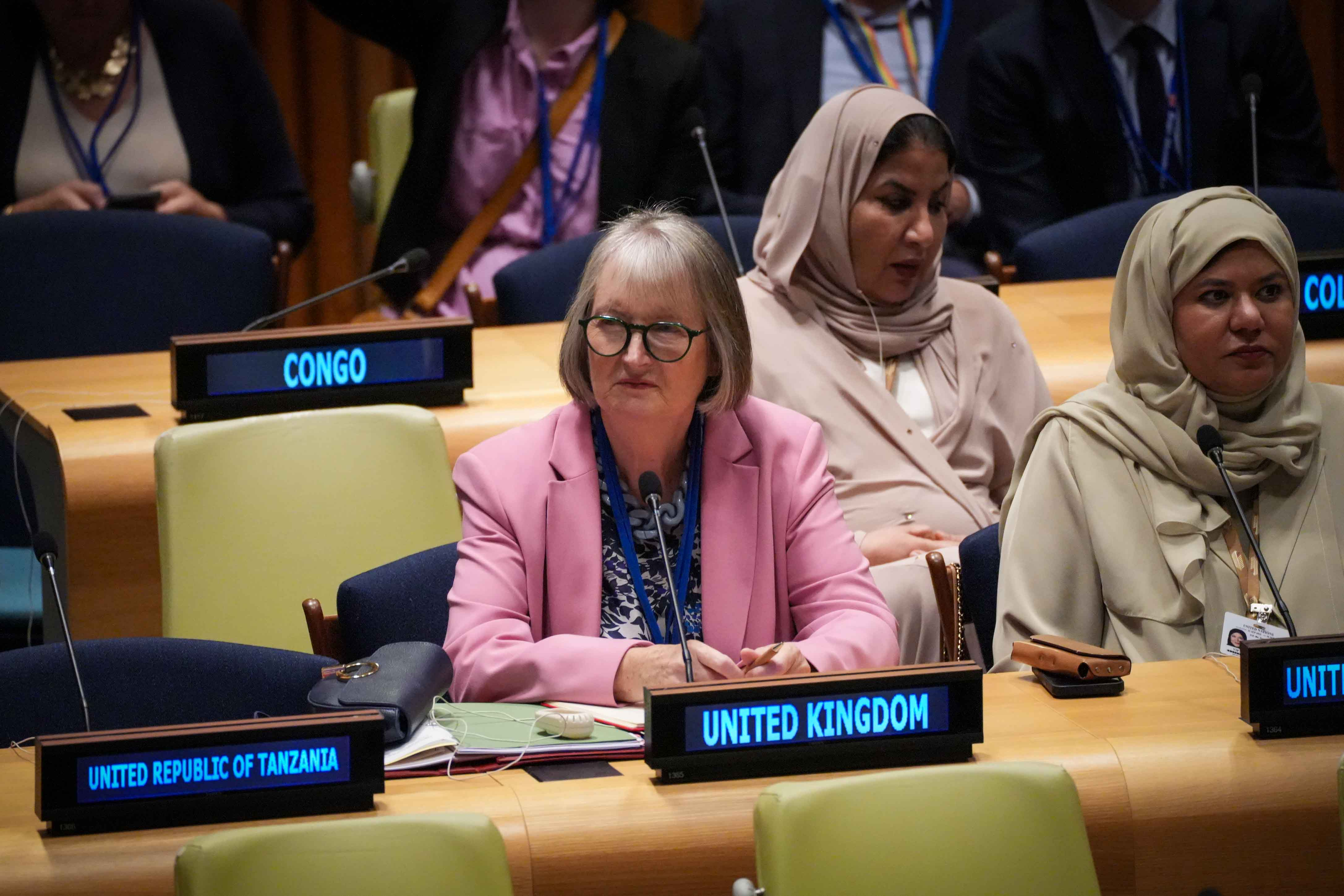
Harman representing the UK as Special Envoy for Women and Girls at the United Nations Headquarters in New York, United States, in 2025

On 8 March 2025, International Women's Day, Harman was appointed by Foreign Secretary David Lammy as UK Special Envoy for Women and Girls, with the aim to "co-ordinate efforts across the globe" to push for the protection of women's and girls rights over reproductive health, access to education and freedom from gender-based violence.

Having previously described herself as a detractor of Peter Mandelson, Harman stated on Beth Rigby's podcast Electoral Dysfunction that his failure to resign over his ties to the sex offender Jeffrey Epstein was "shameful". She argued that Mandelson should have known the gravity of his relationship with Epstein and stepped down in the "national interest" rather than being forced to leave. She described his appointment as UK ambassador to the United States as a "horrible, awful episode" and expressed disbelief that Mandelson would send messages of "love and support" to a convicted sex offender, particularly as she serves as the UK's special envoy for women and girls. She publicly sided with Prime Minister Keir Starmer's decision to sack Mandelson, saying, "it was right that Keir Starmer sacked him".

In February 2026, Harman stated that the ongoing Mandelson scandal could "finish" Starmer "unless he takes action", saying that he looked "weak, naïve and gullible." She also led calls for Starmer to appoint a woman as his de facto deputy leader to oversee a "complete culture change" in Downing Street.

On 9 May 2026, Keir Starmer appointed Harman as his adviser on Women and Girls.

== Personal life ==
Harman married Jack Dromey in August 1982 at Willesden Register Office in North London, after meeting him on the picket line of the Grunwick dispute in 1977; she was legal advisor to the Grunwick Strike Committee. They had three children: Harry (born February 1983), Joseph (born November 1984) and Amy (born January 1987). Harry and Amy have Harman's surname. Labour colleague Patricia Hewitt is godmother to one of their children. They sent Harry to the grant-maintained Roman Catholic London Oratory School and Joseph to the state selective St Olave's Grammar School, Orpington. They owned a number of houses and properties, including a home in Herne Hill, London and a house in Suffolk. Dromey died on 7 January 2022.

In 2012, Harman was awarded the Freedom of the Borough of Southwark.

=== Motoring convictions ===
In 2003, Harman was fined £400 and banned from driving for seven days after being convicted of driving at 99 mph (159 km/h) on a motorway, 29 mph (47 km/h) above the speed limit. In 2007, Harman was issued with a £60 fixed penalty notice and given three penalty points on her licence for driving at 50 mph (80 km/h) in a temporary 40 mph (64 km/h) zone. Harman paid the fine several months late and avoided appearing at Ipswich magistrates court. Harman was again caught breaking the speed limit the following April, this time in a 30 mph zone, receiving a further 3 points on her driving licence.

In January 2010 Harman pleaded guilty to driving without due care and attention in relation to an incident on 3 July 2009 where she struck another vehicle whilst driving using a mobile phone, she admitted the offence in court. Harman was fined £350, ordered to pay £70 costs, a £15 victim surcharge and had three points added to her licence. Road safety organisation Brake criticised the leniency of the punishment and decision to drop the charge of driving whilst using a mobile phone. The judge defended the decision stating: "Ms Harman's guilty plea to driving without due care and attention included her admitting that she had been using a mobile phone at the time".

== In popular culture ==
Harman was portrayed by Deborah Findlay in the 2015 Channel 4 television film Coalition.

== See also ==
- Miliband shadow cabinet
- Blair shadow cabinet
- Smith shadow cabinet
- Shadow Cabinet elections: 1992, 1993, 1994, 1995, and 1996

== Publications ==
- Sex Discrimination in Schools: How to Fight it by Harriet Harman, 1978, Civil Liberties Trust ISBN 0-901108-73-1
- Justice Deserted: Subversion of the Jury by Harriet Harman and J. A. G. Griffith, 1979, Civil Liberties Trust ISBN 0-901108-79-0
- Violence Against Social Workers: The Implications for Practice by Dan Norris, foreword by Harriet Harman, Jessica Kingsley Publishers ISBN 1-85302-041-9
- The Family Way: A New Approach to Policy Making by Harriet Harman et al., 1990, Institute for Public Policy Research ISBN 1-872452-15-9
- The Century Gap: 20th Century Man/21st Century Woman by Harriet Harman, 1993, Vermilion ISBN 0-09-177819-0
- Winning for Women by Harriet Harman and Deborah Mattinson, 2000, Fabian Society ISBN 0-7163-0596-8
- Women with Attitude by Susan Vinnicombe, John Bank, foreword by Harriet Harman, 2002, Routledge ISBN 0-415-28742-1
- A Woman's Work by Harriet Harman, 2017, Allen Lane ISBN 978-0-241-27494-1

Parliament of the United Kingdom
Preceded by Harry Lamborn	Member of Parliament for Peckham; 1982–1997	Constituency abolished
New constituency	Member of Parliament for Camberwell and Peckham; 1997–2024	Constituency abolished
Political offices
Preceded by Margaret Beckett	Shadow Chief Secretary to the Treasury; 1992–1994	Succeeded by Alistair Darling
Preceded by John Prescott	Shadow Secretary of State for Employment; 1994–1995	Succeeded by David Blunkett as Shadow Secretary of State for Education and Employment
Preceded by Margaret Beckett	Shadow Secretary of State for Health; 1995–1996	Succeeded by Chris Smith
Preceded by Chris Smith	Shadow Secretary of State for Social Security; 1996–1997	Succeeded by Peter Lilley
Preceded by Peter Lilley	Secretary of State for Social Security; 1997–1998	Succeeded by Alistair Darling
New office	Minister for Women; 1997–1998	Succeeded by The Baroness Jay of Paddington
Preceded by Ross Cranston	Solicitor General for England and Wales; 2001–2005	Succeeded by Mike O'Brien
Preceded by Jack Straw	Leader of the House of Commons; 2007–2010	Succeeded by George Young
Preceded by Jack Straw	Lord Privy Seal; 2007–2010	Succeeded by George Young
Preceded by Ruth Kelly as Minister for Women	Minister for Women and Equality; 2007–2010	Succeeded by Theresa May as Minister for Women and Equalities
Preceded by David Cameron	Leader of the Opposition; 2010	Succeeded by Ed Miliband
Preceded by Douglas Alexander	Shadow Secretary of State for International Development; 2010–2011	Succeeded by Ivan Lewis
Preceded by Jack Straw; Acting	Shadow Deputy Prime Minister of the United Kingdom; 2010–2015	Succeeded by Hilary Benn; Acting as Shadow First Secretary of State
Preceded by Ivan Lewis	Shadow Secretary of State for Culture, Media and Sport; 2011–2015	Succeeded by Chris Bryant
Preceded by Ed Miliband	Leader of the Opposition; 2015	Succeeded by Jeremy Corbyn
Party political offices
Preceded by John Prescott	Deputy Leader of the Labour Party; 2007–2015	Succeeded by Tom Watson
Preceded by Hazel Blears	Labour Party Chair; 2007–2015	Succeeded by Tom Watson
Preceded by Gordon Brown	Leader of the Labour Party; Acting; 2010	Succeeded by Ed Miliband
Preceded by Ed Miliband	Leader of the Labour Party; Acting; 2015	Succeeded by Jeremy Corbyn
Honorary titles
First	Mother of the House; 2010–2024	Succeeded by Diane Abbott
