= Derry Irvine, Baron Irvine of Lairg =

British politician and baron (born 1940)

The Right Honourable The Lord Irvine of Lairg PC KC
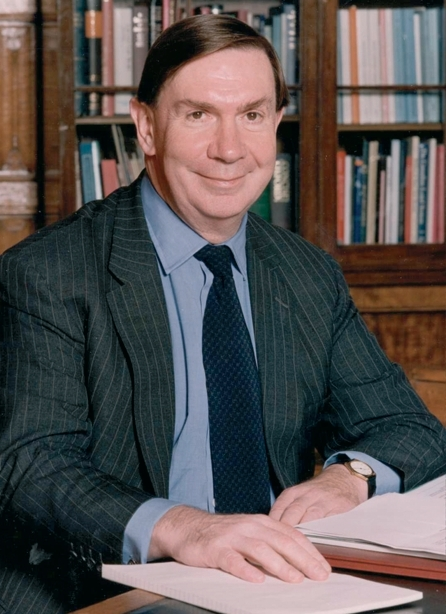
- Official portrait, c. 2001

Lord Chancellor
- In office 2 May 1997 – 12 June 2003
- Monarch: Elizabeth II
- Prime Minister: Tony Blair
- Preceded by: The Lord Mackay of Clashfern
- Succeeded by: The Lord Falconer of Thoroton

Shadow portfolios
- 1992–1997: Shadow Lord Chancellor

Member of the House of Lords
- Lord Temporal
- Life peerage 25 March 1987 – 11 May 2026

Personal details
- Born: Alexander Andrew Mackay Irvine; 23 June 1940 (age 86) Inverness, Scotland
- Party: Labour
- Education: University of Glasgow; Christ's College, Cambridge

Alexander Andrew Mackay Irvine, Baron Irvine of Lairg (born 23 June 1940), known as Derry Irvine, is a Scottish lawyer and politician who served as Lord Chancellor from 1997 to 2003.

He founded and headed 11 King's Bench Walk Chambers in the 1980s, and later became a recorder and a deputy High Court judge. A member of the Labour Party, Irvine was appointed to the House of Lords in 1987 and served as Shadow Lord Chancellor from 1992 to 1997. He was appointed to the Cabinet as Lord Chancellor by Prime Minister Tony Blair, his former pupil, after the 1997 general election, and served until his dismissal in 2003.

== Early life and education ==
Alexander Andrew Mackay Irvine was born on 23 June 1940 in Inverness, Scotland to a roofer and a waitress. He was educated at the independent Hutchesons' Boys' Grammar School in Glasgow.

Irvine studied Scots law at the University of Glasgow, where he became involved in debating through the Glasgow University Dialectic Society and Glasgow University Union; he befriended Donald Dewar and John Smith through his involvement in the societies. Irvine subsequently studied English law at Christ's College, Cambridge.

== Legal career ==
After teaching law at the London School of Economics, Irvine was called to the Bar in 1967 and joined chambers headed by Morris Finer. He was appointed a Queen's Counsel in 1978 and founded 11 King's Bench Walk Chambers in 1981, becoming head of chambers. Irvine's pupil barristers included Tony Blair and Cherie Booth. In the 1980s, he became a Recorder and later a Deputy High Court Judge.

== Political career ==
At the 1970 general election, Irvine unsuccessfully contested Hendon North as the Labour Party candidate. A legal adviser to the Party through the 1980s, he was awarded a life peerage as Baron Irvine of Lairg, of Lairg in the District of Sutherland, on 25 March 1987.

Irvine served as Shadow Lord Chancellor from 1992 to 1997 under Labour leaders John Smith, Margaret Beckett, and Tony Blair. After Labour's election victory in 1997, Blair appointed him as Lord Chancellor.

During Irvine's tenure as Lord Chancellor, he oversaw the incorporation of the European Convention on Human Rights into UK law. In 2001, Irvine gained further responsibility for constitutional issues including human rights and freedom of information. He notably chose not to wear the officeholder's traditional attire during most of his tenure in the role. Irvine was the last Lord Chancellor to give judgments at the Appellate Committee of the House of Lords, giving a brief concurring judgment in AIB Group (UK) Ltd v Martin [2001] UKHL 63. He also gave the last reasoned judgment to be given by a Lord Chancellor, in Uratemp Ventures Ltd v Collins [2001] UKHL 43.

Blair dismissed Irvine from the Cabinet in June 2003, when he announced his intention to abolish the position of Lord Chancellor. However, the role was not abolished, but was used as a secondary title for the Secretary of State for Constitutional Affairs from 2003 to 2007 and the Justice Secretary from 2007.

=== Controversies ===
Irvine was criticised for spending £650,000 of public money to redecorate the Lord Chancellor's residence in 1998. The cost included £59,000 in hand-printed wallpaper, and contractors had to sign the Official Secrets Act to prevent expenditure leaks. Although renovation responsibility was with the Lords authorities, Irvine defended the cost by stating that the materials would last longer than cheaper products.

He was awarded a pay rise of £22,691 in 2003, as a result of a formula designed to keep his salary ahead that of the Lord Chief Justice. However, he accepted a lower increase following public backlash to the decision.

== Personal life ==
Irvine was married to Alison McNair, with whom he had a son, Alistair, and later divorced. He began his relationship with McNair during her marriage to Donald Dewar. Alistair was sentenced to 16 months in jail in the US, after pleading guilty to stalking and vandalism in 2002.

=== Arms ===
Coat of arms of Derry Irvine, Baron Irvine of Lairg
Crest A man in the attire of the Lord Chancellor's purse bearer and carrying the Lord Chancellor's purse Proper. Escutcheon Argent three holly leaves Proper on a chief Azure two bears' heads couped of the first muzzled Gules. Supporters Dexter a salmon Proper having in its mouth a signet ring Or sinister a lion per fess Or and Sable. Motto Do The Right

Political offices
Preceded by The Lord Mishcon	Shadow Lord Chancellor; 1992–1997	Succeeded by The Lord Mackay of Clashfern
Preceded by The Lord Mackay of Clashfern	Lord High Chancellor of Great Britain; 1997–2003	Succeeded by The Lord Falconer of Thoroton
Orders of precedence in the United Kingdom
Preceded by The Lord Donoughue	Gentlemen; Baron Irvine of Lairg	Followed by The Lord Stevens of Ludgate
