= 2024 Conservative Party leadership election =

British political party election

- 24 July – 2 November 2024
- Turnout: 72.8% (▼10.6 pp)
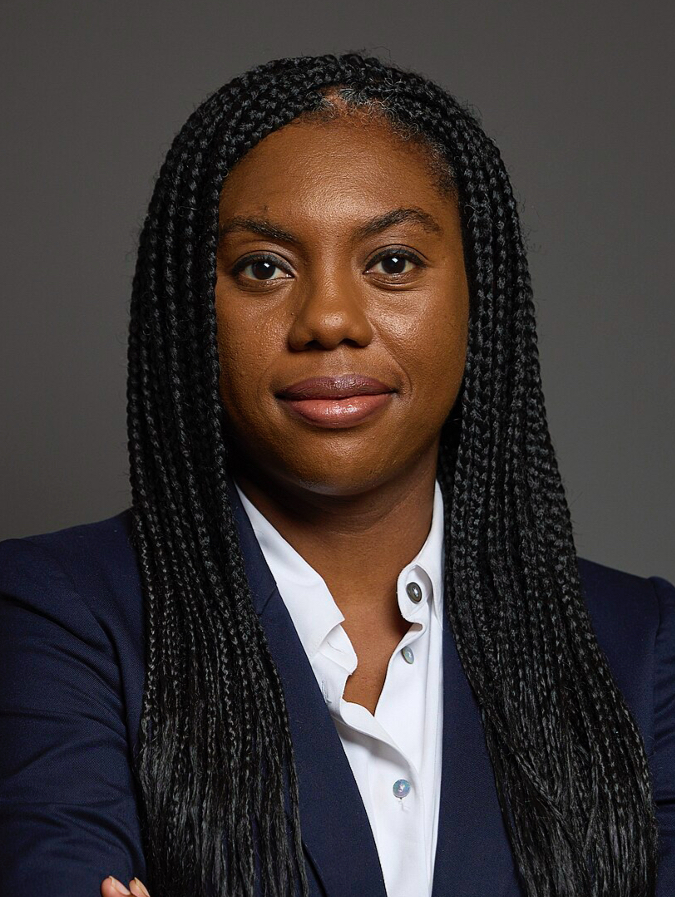

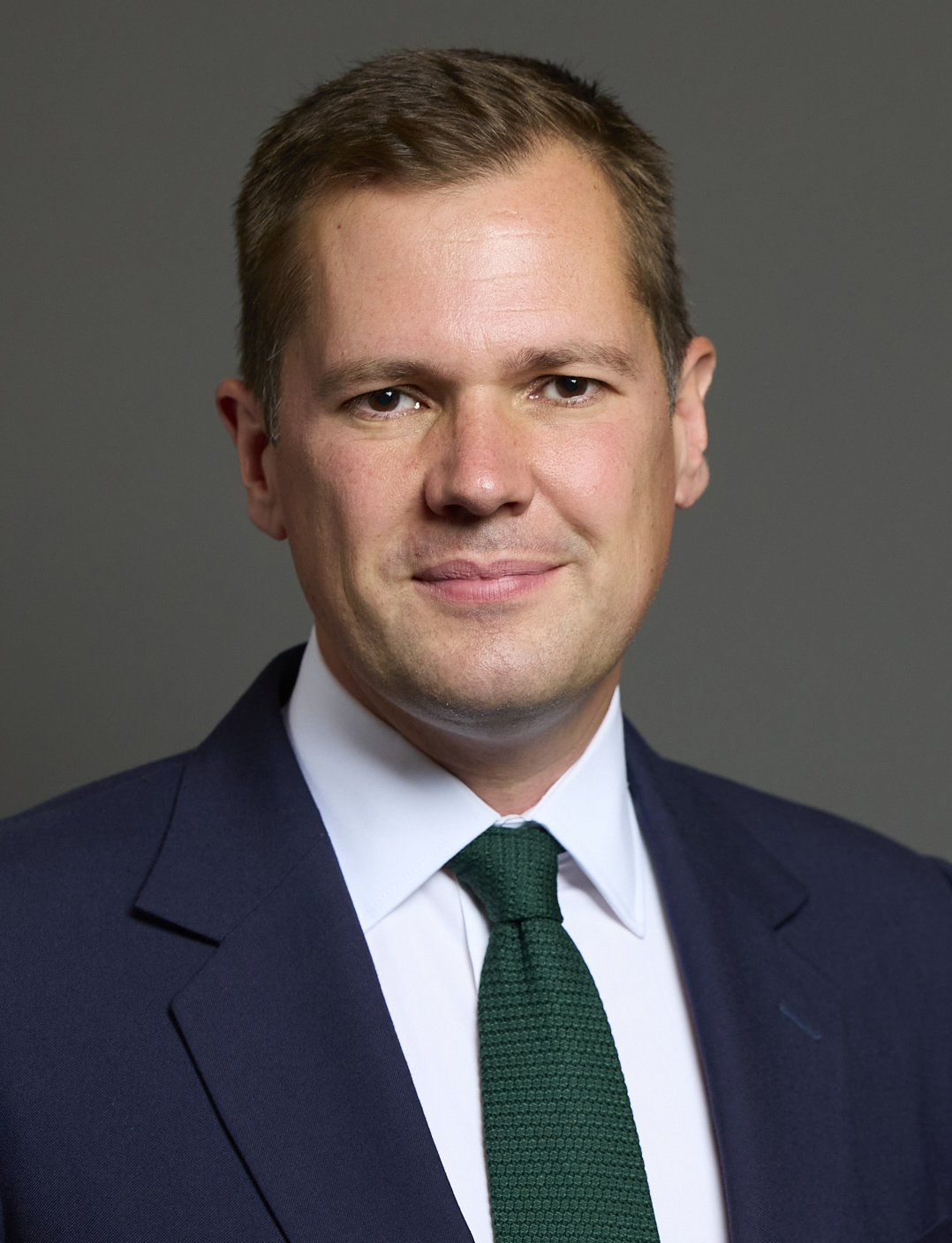
Candidate	Kemi Badenoch	Robert Jenrick
Fourth MPs' ballot	42 (35.0%)	41 (34.2%)
Members' vote	53,806 (56.5%)	41,388 (43.5%)
Leader before election
Rishi Sunak
Elected Leader
Kemi Badenoch

The 2024 Conservative Party leadership election was announced on 5 July 2024 when then-Prime Minister Rishi Sunak declared his intention to resign as Conservative Party leader following the party's defeat at the 2024 general election. The leadership contest began on 24 July and ended on 31 October. On 2 November, Kemi Badenoch was announced as the winner of the members' ballot.

Six candidates stood for the leadership: Kemi Badenoch, James Cleverly, Robert Jenrick, Priti Patel, Mel Stride and Tom Tugendhat. Four were eliminated in a series of votes, until two remained to stand in the final ballot, which Conservative Party members voted in. On 4 September, Patel was eliminated in the first round of voting, with Jenrick outperforming expectations by coming first. On 10 September, Stride was eliminated in the second round and went on to endorse Cleverly.

Following a strong performance at the Conservative Party Conference, Cleverly emerged as a frontrunner by coming first in the third round of voting, whilst Tugendhat was eliminated. Despite this, Cleverly was eliminated in a close fourth round of voting, leaving Badenoch and Jenrick to go head-to-head in a members' vote.

Badenoch won the head-to-head and was elected Conservative leader on 2 November 2024. She appointed Stride, Patel, Jenrick and later Cleverly and Tugendhat to her shadow cabinet, although Patel and Cleverly stood down August 2026 in order to become Conservative Party International Secretary and run for Mayor of London respectively.

In January 2026, Jenrick defected to Reform UK.

== Background ==
=== July 2022 leadership election and Liz Truss's premiership ===
On 7 July 2022, Boris Johnson resigned as Conservative leader and Prime Minister after dozens of ministers resigned from his government following a slew of scandals and controversies, including Partygate, that marred the final few months of his premiership, culminating in the Chris Pincher scandal. A leadership election was triggered to replace him, in which Rishi Sunak and Liz Truss were the final two candidates to be put forward to party members after a series of MPs' ballots. Truss won the contest, beating Sunak in the members' vote 57% to 43%. She assumed leadership of the party on 5 September 2022, and became Prime Minister the following day.

Truss's premiership would turn out to be the shortest of any Prime Minister in history, lasting just 49 days. Truss's tenure oversaw the death and state funeral of Elizabeth II, which caused government business to be suspended during the 10-day national mourning period from 8–19 September. On 23 September 2022, in response to the cost-of-living crisis, Truss's Chancellor Kwasi Kwarteng announced a 'mini-budget', which introduced large-scale tax cuts and borrowing. It caused the value of pound sterling to crash, sliding to an all-time low against the US dollar. The mini-budget was widely criticised and its policies were gradually reversed over the following three weeks. The Conservatives' opinion poll ratings also began to fall sharply in the weeks following the announcement, dipping to around 20% as they trailed Labour by over 30% in some polls.

Truss dismissed Kwarteng without explanation on 14 October 2022 and replaced him with Jeremy Hunt. By 17 October, pressure was beginning to mount on Truss's premiership and five Conservative MPs were calling for her resignation. On 19 October, Home Secretary Suella Braverman resigned after admitting to having used her personal email address to send a Cabinet document and her resignation letter was highly critical of Truss's government. Later that evening, a parliamentary vote on a debate to ban fracking — which was opposed by the government — descended into chaos over confusion whether it was being treated as a confidence vote in the government, compounded by speculation that the chief whip and deputy chief whip had resigned, and by allegations, later refuted, that some Conservative MPs had been manhandled in the division lobby. On 20 October, the following day, Truss announced she would resign as Prime Minister and Conservative leader shortly, triggering a second leadership election to find her replacement.

=== October 2022 leadership election and Rishi Sunak's premiership ===
The timetable for the October 2022 leadership election was much shorter than the July one. An expedited process was set out; candidates were required to obtain 100 nominations from fellow Conservative MPs before 2 pm on 24 October, and an MPs' ballot followed by an online members' ballot was to be held shortly thereafter if more than one candidate received more than 100 nominations. Only two candidates announced their intention to stand: Sunak and Penny Mordaunt. There was intensive speculation that Johnson would initiate a bid for a return to the top post; at one point he was expected to stand and even received 62 nominations from MPs, but he subsequently declined to enter the contest.

As only Sunak met the required threshold among MPs, receiving 197 nominations to Mordaunt's 27, Mordaunt withdrew from the leadership contest two minutes before nominations closed and Sunak was left the only candidate remaining, enabling him to win the contest and become Conservative leader without an MPs' ballot or members' vote. Sunak became Prime Minister the next day, on 25 October.

In his first speech as Prime Minister, Sunak said that Truss "was not wrong" to want to improve growth and that he "admired her restlessness to create change", but admitted that "some mistakes were made", and that he was elected prime minister in part to fix them. He promised to "place economic stability and confidence at the heart of this government's agenda". In an almost immediate reversal of Truss's policy, Sunak reinstated the ban on fracking on 26 October 2022 as outlined in the 2019 Conservative manifesto.

Sunak was faced with the task of rebuilding the Conservatives' reputation which had been significantly damaged by the controversies and scandals of the previous year and the Truss ministry. While their poll ratings recovered slightly over the following months, it still wasn't enough to bring them back to pre-Truss levels. Sunak contested his first local elections as leader on 4 May 2023, where the Conservatives suffered heavy losses. Two months later, on 20 July 2023, they lost two seats in by-elections; one to Labour and one to the Liberal Democrats. Their fortunes remained unchanged throughout policy changes of the following year, such as the shelving of the HS2 northern phase in October. The Conservatives lost two further seats in by-elections on 15 February 2024.

In March 2024, there were suggestions that Sunak could face a leadership challenge before the upcoming general election — which was expected within the calendar year — if the Conservatives perform poorly at the local elections on 2 May. Sunak however said he would resist a challenge, even if that ends up being the case. As predicted, 2 May saw grim showing for the Conservatives, who suffered their worst local election results since 1996. Additionally, they lost another seat to Labour in the Blackpool South by-election, and narrowly lost the West Midlands mayoral election in a knife-edge vote. Sunak's premiership was described as more stable than that of his two predecessors, while still not being able to represent a turnaround for the Conservatives.

=== 2024 general election ===
On 22 May 2024, in a surprise announcement, Sunak called a general election for 4 July.

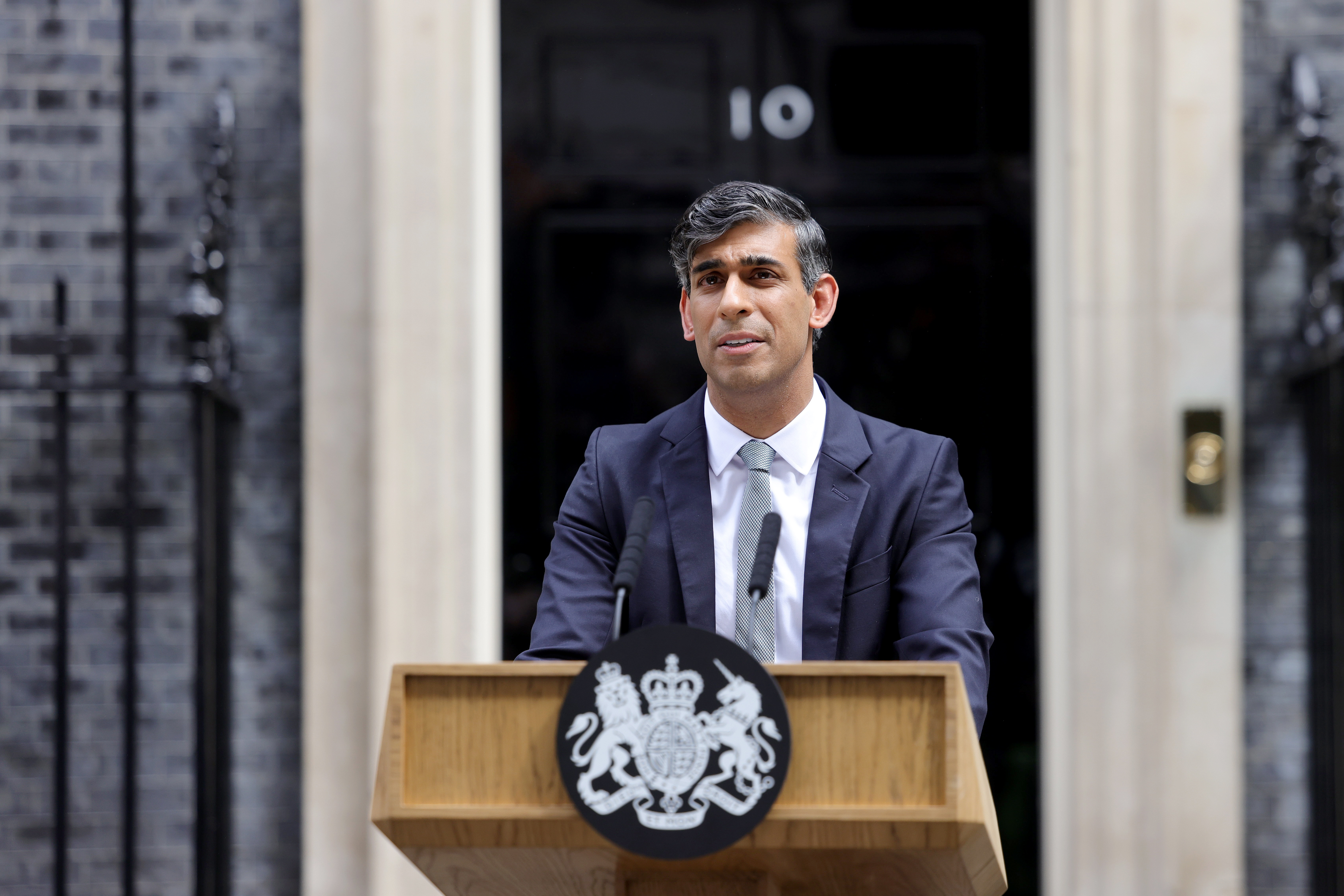
Rishi Sunak giving his final speech as Prime Minister on 5 July 2024

Labour won the general election in a landslide, ending 14 years of Conservative government. Sunak conceded the election at 4:40 am on 5 July. The Conservatives experienced the largest defeat in its history, being reduced to 121 seats on a vote share of 23.7 per cent. It lost 244 seats, including those of twelve Cabinet ministers and that of former Prime Minister Truss. It also lost all its seats in Wales.

Subsequently, Sunak said in his final speech as Prime Minister that he would resign as leader of the party once a successor was elected.

== Campaign ==
In early July, shortly after the general election, reports suggested that Danny Kruger and John Hayes, prominent MPs on the right of the party, were going to support the prospective leadership candidate Robert Jenrick. This was seen as an early setback for Suella Braverman, since both Kruger and Hayes previously campaigned for her bid to succeed Boris Johnson in July 2022. The i reported that following Braverman's controversial speeches regarding the pride flag, multiple Conservative MPs believed she had lost her support among her colleagues and could defect to Reform UK. Sources in both parties suggested Braverman was expected to defect, potentially following the Conservative leadership election if she doesn't win. Braverman did not stand, but said she could have surpassed the ten MP threshold to do so.

James Cleverly, Tom Tugendhat, Robert Jenrick, Mel Stride, Priti Patel and Kemi Badenoch were the confirmed candidates at the deadline of nominations on 29 July. Tugendhat and Cleverly were pitching themselves as more moderate, centre-ground candidates, while Badenoch, Jenrick and Patel were competing for the vote of the party's right-wing, and Stride is seen as being between the two groupings.

Bob Blackman, 1922 Committee chair, announced that he would give out formal warnings, or "yellow cards", if they briefed against their rivals.

Ipsos reported that there was widespread apathy around the election, with 62% of people saying that they did not personally care who became the leader.

Cleverly's elimination in the final MPs' ballot surprised many. It was speculated that some of Cleverly's supporters had voted for other candidates, presuming Cleverly would be safe, in order to pick an easier rival against him in the members' vote, i.e. a failure of tactical voting.

On 17 October, GB News hosted Decision Time: The Race to Lead, the only major programme to feature the final two contenders, Kemi Badenoch and Robert Jenrick, after negotiations between their camps for the BBC to host a similar programme broke down. The two-hour programme, hosted by Christopher Hope, saw the candidates separately answer questions from a Conservative-voting audience. It drew a peak audience of 152,600.

As of the end of the campaign, Jenrick raised £480,000 towards his campaign, while Badenoch raised £422,500.

== Schedule ==
The elected chair of the 1922 Committee, Bob Blackman, suggested prior to the election that the party must take its time in choosing a leader. Following the election, he said that he expected Sunak would not be the leader by the Conservative Party Conference, which was held at the end of September.

The 1922 Committee met to decide the schedule of the election on the 22 July. The leadership race is expected to last for a little over three months with Sunak's successor being confirmed on 2 November. The timetable of key dates is in the table below. Conservative Party Conference will act as a 'beauty parade' for the remaining candidates.

In addition to the voting timetable below, the Conservatives "pay to play" rules required the final four candidates, as decided by Conservative MPs on 10 September, to pay £50,000 to CCHQ.

Following the last round of MPs voting, the final two candidates were required to pay another £150,000 to the central party headquarters.

=== Timetable ===
Key dates
Date	Event
24–29 July	Nomination period; potential candidates must gather the support of ten fellow Conservative MPs to qualify for the first MPs' ballot.
4 and 10 September	Conservative MPs vote in two ballots to reduce to four candidates.
29 September – 2 October	The Conservative Party Conference takes place, where each of the four remaining leadership hopefuls give a speech.
8 and 9 October	Conservative MPs vote in two more ballots, where candidates are reduced to two finalists.
10–31 October	An online ballot of the final two candidates takes place for all Conservative party members.
2 November	The result of the ballot is announced, and the winner becomes the leader of the Conservative Party.

== Candidates ==
In June 2024, during the campaign for the 2024 general election, The Guardian reported that leadership hopefuls were already lobbying for support from MP candidates for a potential upcoming leadership election, which was seen as likely given that opinion polls showed the Conservatives on course for a heavy defeat. The Times also reported that both Penny Mordaunt and Kemi Badenoch registered website domains for a leadership campaign. As Mordaunt lost her seat in the general election, her prospective campaign never came to fruition; the Conservative Party constitution states that the leader of the party must be a Member of Parliament. Despite press speculation that former leader Boris Johnson might make another attempt to return to the position, this requirement likewise prevented him from doing so, as Johnson had not been an MP since June 2023.

=== Candidates who declared ===
The following candidates declared leadership campaigns.

Candidate	Constituency	Current office	Former offices	Campaign	Ref.
Kemi Badenoch	MP for North West Essex (2024–present); Saffron Walden (2017–2024)	Shadow Secretary of State for Housing, Communities and Local Government (2024)	Secretary of State for Business and Trade (2023–2024); Minister for Women and Equalities (2022–2024); Secretary of State for International Trade (2022–2023)	Website Announced: 28 July 2024 Winner	
James Cleverly	MP for Braintree (2015–present)	Shadow Home Secretary (2024)	Home Secretary (2023–2024); Foreign Secretary (2022–2023); Secretary of State for Education (2022); Party Chair (2019–2020)	Website Announced: 23 July 2024; Eliminated: 9 October 2024	
Robert Jenrick	MP for Newark (2014–present)	Backbencher	Minister of State for Immigration (2022–2023); Secretary of State for Housing, Communities and Local Government (2019–2021)	Website Announced: 25 July 2024 Eliminated: 2 November 2024	
Priti Patel	MP for Witham (2010–present)	Backbencher	Home Secretary (2019–2022); Secretary of State for International Development (2016–2017)	Website Announced: 27 July 2024; Eliminated: 4 September 2024	
Mel Stride	MP for Central Devon (2010–present)	Shadow Secretary of State for Work and Pensions (2024)	Secretary of State for Work and Pensions (2022–2024); Chair of the Treasury Select Committee (2019–2022); Leader of the House of Commons (2019)	Website Announced: 26 July 2024; Eliminated: 10 September 2024	
Tom Tugendhat	MP for Tonbridge (2024–present); Tonbridge and Malling (2015–2024)	Shadow Minister for Security (2024)	Minister of State for Security (2022–2024); Chair of the Foreign Affairs Select Committee (2017–2022)	Website Announced: 24 July 2024; Eliminated: 8 October 2024	

=== Explored ===
The following Conservative Party politicians explored standing but ultimately declined to stand or failed to receive the ten required nominations:

- Victoria Atkins, Shadow Health Secretary (2024–present), Health Secretary (2023–2024), MP for Louth and Horncastle (2015–present) (endorsed Jenrick)
- Suella Braverman, Home Secretary (2022, 2022–2023), Attorney General (2020–2022), MP for Fareham and Waterlooville (2024–present); Fareham (2015–2024) (endorsed Jenrick)
- Kevin Hollinrake, Shadow Business Secretary (2024–present), MP for Thirsk and Malton (2015–present) (endorsed Badenoch)

=== Potential candidates prior to the election ===
The following figures lost their seats in the 2024 general election and were ineligible to stand, but were discussed as potential candidates prior to electoral results.

- Steve Baker, Minister of State for Northern Ireland (2022–2024), MP for Wycombe (2010–2024) (endorsed Tugendhat then Badenoch)
- Miriam Cates, Co-chair of the New Conservatives (2023–2024), MP for Penistone and Stocksbridge (2019–2024) (endorsed Jenrick)
- Lucy Frazer, Culture Secretary (2023–2024), MP for South East Cambridgeshire (2015–2024)
- Gillian Keegan, Secretary of State for Education (2022–2024), MP for Chichester (2017–2024)
- Penny Mordaunt, Lord President of the Council and Leader of the House of Commons (2022–2024), MP for Portsmouth North (2010–2024)
- Grant Shapps, Defence Secretary (2023–2024), MP for Welwyn Hatfield (2005–2024) (endorsed Cleverly)
- Liz Truss, Prime Minister of the United Kingdom (2022), MP for South West Norfolk (2010–2024)

=== Declined ===
The following were suggested by commentators as potential candidates for the leadership but declined to stand:

- Andrew Bowie, Shadow Secretary of State for Scotland (2024-present), Shadow Minister for Veterans (2024), Parliamentary Undersecretary of State for Net Zero (2023–2024), MP for West Aberdeenshire and Kincardine (2017–present) (endorsed Badenoch)
- Claire Coutinho, Shadow Energy Secretary (2024–present), Energy Secretary (2023–2024), MP for East Surrey (2019–present) (endorsed Badenoch)
- David Davis, Brexit Secretary (2016–2018), Shadow Home Secretary (2003–2008), MP for Goole and Pocklington (2024–present, formerly Haltemprice and Howden and Boothferry 1987–2024) (endorsed Badenoch)
- Oliver Dowden, Shadow Deputy Prime Minister of the United Kingdom (2024), Deputy Prime Minister of the United Kingdom (2023–2024), MP for Hertsmere (2015–present)
- Iain Duncan Smith, Secretary of State for Work and Pensions (2010–2016), Leader of the Conservative Party (2001–2003), MP for Chingford and Woodford Green (1997–present, formerly Chingford 1992–1997) (endorsed Badenoch)
- Jeremy Hunt, Shadow Chancellor of the Exchequer (2024), Chancellor of the Exchequer (2022–2024), Foreign Secretary (2018–2019), MP for Godalming and Ash (2024–present, formerly South West Surrey, 2005–2024)
- Laura Trott, Shadow Education Secretary (2024–present), Chief Secretary to the Treasury (2023–2024), MP for Sevenoaks (2019–present) (endorsed Badenoch)

== Opinion polling ==
=== Conservative party members ===
Multi-candidate polling

Dates conducted	Pollster	Client	Sample size	Kemi Badenoch	James Cleverly	Robert Jenrick	Tom Tugendhat	Mel Stride	Priti Patel	Suella Braverman	Jeremy Hunt	Victoria Atkins	Esther McVey	Others	Don't know
3–4 October 2024	Conservative Home (Note: The ConservativeHome Party Members' Survey is a self-selecting panel, not a demographically or geographically weighted poll. The panel is composed of over 3,300 members of the Conservative Party, who receive the survey by email.)	N/A	784	32%	25%	19%	12%	Eliminated	Eliminated	Did not stand				–	12%
20–29 September 2024	YouGov	Sky News	802	27%	16%	24%	16%	Eliminated	Eliminated	Did not stand				–	17%
26–27 September 2024	Conservative Home	N/A	812	36%	13%	25%	13%	Eliminated	Eliminated	Did not stand				–	13%
11–16 September 2024	Popular Conservatism (Note: Sample of party members who responded to a survey issued by the right-wing Popular Conservatism group. The survey did not use an independent polling organisation.)	N/A	501	34.9%	6.8%	38.3%	5.6%	Eliminated	Eliminated	Did not stand				–	12.8%
28 August–4 September 2024	Popular Conservatism	N/A	444	30.4%	5.2%	38.3%	3.8%	2%	Eliminated	Did not stand				–	20.3%
2–3 September 2024	Conservative Home	N/A	863	34%	11%	18%	13%	2%	7%	Did not stand				–	15%
14–19 August 2024	Popular Conservatism	N/A	512	28.2%	4.5%	28.4%	3.9%	1.8%	17.4%	Did not stand				–	15.8%
6–15 August 2024	YouGov	N/A	903	24%	14%	12%	16%	2%	11%	Did not stand				–	19%
2–12 August 2024	Techne	James Cleverly	805	14%	26%	10%	11%	4%	20%	Did not stand				–	15%
5–8 August 2024	Conservative Home	N/A	917	33%	10%	19%	10%	2%	8%	Did not stand				–	18%
31 July–5 August 2024	Popular Conservatism	N/A	468	23%	5%	24%	3%	2%	21%	Did not stand				–	22%
10–11 July 2024	Conservative Home	N/A	995	26%	9%	13%	13%	–	3%	10%	–	2%	1%	7%	16%
July 2024	YouGov (Note: 'Don't know' and 'None' removed)	QMUL and Sussex University	725	31%	10%	7%	15%	–	6%	16%	12%	2%	–	–	–

Head-to-head

Dates conducted	Pollster	Client	Sample size	Kemi Badenoch	James Cleverly	Robert Jenrick	Tom Tugendhat	Mel Stride	Priti Patel	Suella Braverman	Don't know	Wouldn't vote
23–24 October 2024	Conservative Home	N/A	828	55%	Eliminated	31%	Eliminated	Eliminated	Eliminated	Did not stand	14%	–
3–4 October 2024	Conservative Home	N/A	793	48%	42%	—N/a	—N/a	Eliminated	Eliminated	Did not stand	9%	–
3–4 October 2024	Conservative Home	N/A	793	53%	—N/a	33%	—N/a	Eliminated	Eliminated	Did not stand	13%	–
3–4 October 2024	Conservative Home	N/A	793	62%	—N/a	—N/a	28%	Eliminated	Eliminated	Did not stand	9%	–
3–4 October 2024	Conservative Home	N/A	793	—N/a	54%	36%	—N/a	Eliminated	Eliminated	Did not stand	10%	–
3–4 October 2024	Conservative Home	N/A	793	—N/a	67%	—N/a	18%	Eliminated	Eliminated	Did not stand	15%	–
3–4 October 2024	Conservative Home	N/A	793	—N/a	—N/a	52%	36%	Eliminated	Eliminated	Did not stand	12%	–
20–29 September 2024	YouGov	Sky News	802	45%	38%	—N/a	—N/a	Eliminated	Eliminated	Did not stand	10%	7%
20–29 September 2024	YouGov	Sky News	802	41%	—N/a	38%	—N/a	Eliminated	Eliminated	Did not stand	13%	7%
20–29 September 2024	YouGov	Sky News	802	49%	—N/a	—N/a	35%	Eliminated	Eliminated	Did not stand	11%	6%
20–29 September 2024	YouGov	Sky News	802	—N/a	39%	42%	—N/a	Eliminated	Eliminated	Did not stand	13%	6%
20–29 September 2024	YouGov	Sky News	802	—N/a	43%	—N/a	34%	Eliminated	Eliminated	Did not stand	13%	11%
20–29 September 2024	YouGov	Sky News	802	—N/a	—N/a	46%	34%	Eliminated	Eliminated	Did not stand	14%	6%
26–27 September 2024	Conservative Home	N/A	806	59%	30%	—N/a	—N/a	Eliminated	Eliminated	Did not stand	11%	–
26–27 September 2024	Conservative Home	N/A	806	50%	—N/a	37%	—N/a	Eliminated	Eliminated	Did not stand	14%	–
26–27 September 2024	Conservative Home	N/A	806	63%	—N/a	—N/a	27%	Eliminated	Eliminated	Did not stand	10%	–
26–27 September 2024	Conservative Home	N/A	806	—N/a	37%	51%	—N/a	Eliminated	Eliminated	Did not stand	12%	–
26–27 September 2024	Conservative Home	N/A	806	—N/a	48%	—N/a	30%	Eliminated	Eliminated	Did not stand	22%	–
26–27 September 2024	Conservative Home	N/A	806	—N/a	—N/a	58%	31%	Eliminated	Eliminated	Did not stand	12%	–
2–3 September 2024	Conservative Home	N/A	861	57%	27%	—N/a	—N/a	—N/a	—N/a	Did not stand	16%	–
2–3 September 2024	Conservative Home	N/A	861	51%	—N/a	34%	—N/a	—N/a	—N/a	Did not stand	15%	–
2–3 September 2024	Conservative Home	N/A	861	65%	—N/a	—N/a	—N/a	—N/a	21%	Did not stand	14%	–
2–3 September 2024	Conservative Home	N/A	861	61%	—N/a	—N/a	28%	—N/a	—N/a	Did not stand	11%	–
2–3 September 2024	Conservative Home	N/A	861	69%	—N/a	—N/a	—N/a	16%	—N/a	Did not stand	15%	–
2–3 September 2024	Conservative Home	N/A	861	—N/a	36%	48%	—N/a	—N/a	—N/a	Did not stand	16%	–
2–3 September 2024	Conservative Home	N/A	861	—N/a	51%	—N/a	—N/a	—N/a	33%	Did not stand	16%	–
2–3 September 2024	Conservative Home	N/A	861	—N/a	47%	—N/a	30%	—N/a	—N/a	Did not stand	23%	–
2–3 September 2024	Conservative Home	N/A	861	—N/a	59%	—N/a	—N/a	16%	—N/a	Did not stand	25%	–
2–3 September 2024	Conservative Home	N/A	861	—N/a	—N/a	58%	—N/a	—N/a	23%	Did not stand	19%	–
2–3 September 2024	Conservative Home	N/A	861	—N/a	—N/a	52%	31%	—N/a	—N/a	Did not stand	17%	–
2–3 September 2024	Conservative Home	N/A	861	—N/a	—N/a	61%	—N/a	20%	—N/a	Did not stand	19%	–
2–3 September 2024	Conservative Home	N/A	861	—N/a	—N/a	—N/a	43%	—N/a	41%	Did not stand	16%	–
2–3 September 2024	Conservative Home	N/A	861	—N/a	—N/a	—N/a	—N/a	29%	48%	Did not stand	23%	–
2–3 September 2024	Conservative Home	N/A	861	—N/a	—N/a	—N/a	46%	22%	—N/a	Did not stand	33%	–
16–27 August 2024	JL Partners	The Mail on Sunday	471	42%	—N/a	—N/a	39%	—N/a	—N/a	Did not stand	19%	–
16–27 August 2024	JL Partners	The Mail on Sunday	471	—N/a	—N/a	32%	44%	—N/a	—N/a	Did not stand	23%	–
16–27 August 2024	JL Partners	The Mail on Sunday	471	—N/a	—N/a	—N/a	48%	—N/a	40%	Did not stand	13%	–
16–27 August 2024	JL Partners	The Mail on Sunday	471	34%	—N/a	35%	—N/a	—N/a	—N/a	Did not stand	31%	–
16–27 August 2024	JL Partners	The Mail on Sunday	471	—N/a	—N/a	42%	—N/a	—N/a	35%	Did not stand	24%	–
16–27 August 2024	JL Partners	The Mail on Sunday	471	38%	—N/a	—N/a	—N/a	—N/a	29%	Did not stand	33%	–
2–12 August 2024	YouGov	N/A	910	47%	35%	—N/a	—N/a	—N/a	—N/a	Did not stand	11%	5%
2–12 August 2024	YouGov	N/A	910	—N/a	51%	—N/a	—N/a	—N/a	36%	Did not stand	8%	5%
2–12 August 2024	YouGov	N/A	910	—N/a	—N/a	50%	—N/a	15%	—N/a	Did not stand	24%	10%
2–12 August 2024	YouGov	N/A	910	—N/a	—N/a	48%	—N/a	—N/a	32%	Did not stand	13%	7%
2–12 August 2024	YouGov	N/A	910	55%	—N/a	—N/a	—N/a	—N/a	26%	Did not stand	13%	6%
2–12 August 2024	YouGov	N/A	910	48%	—N/a	33%	—N/a	—N/a	—N/a	Did not stand	11%	8%
2–12 August 2024	YouGov	N/A	910	49%	—N/a	—N/a	31%	—N/a	—N/a	Did not stand	13%	6%
2–12 August 2024	YouGov	N/A	910	—N/a	—N/a	38%	36%	—N/a	—N/a	Did not stand	18%	8%
2–12 August 2024	Techne	James Cleverly	805	28%	51%	—N/a	—N/a	—N/a	—N/a	Did not stand	21%	
2–12 August 2024	Techne	James Cleverly	805	—N/a	49%	28%	—N/a	—N/a	—N/a	Did not stand	23%	
2–12 August 2024	Techne	James Cleverly	805	—N/a	45%	—N/a	—N/a	—N/a	39%	Did not stand	16%	
2–12 August 2024	Techne	James Cleverly	805	—N/a	54%	—N/a	23%	—N/a	—N/a	Did not stand	23%	
2–12 August 2024	Techne	James Cleverly	805	—N/a	59%	—N/a	—N/a	15%	—N/a	Did not stand	26%	
16–19 July 2024	Techne	College Green Group	1,002	29%	—N/a	29%	—N/a	—N/a	—N/a	—N/a	30%	12%
16–19 July 2024	Techne	College Green Group	1,002	—N/a	—N/a	32%	—N/a	—N/a	31%	—N/a	27%	12%
16–19 July 2024	Techne	College Green Group	1,002	—N/a	—N/a	33%	31%	—N/a	—N/a	—N/a	21%	16%
16–19 July 2024	Techne	College Green Group	1,002	—N/a	—N/a	36%	—N/a	—N/a	—N/a	28%	21%	15%
23–30 June	JL Partners	GB News	502	31%	—N/a	—N/a	—N/a	—N/a	—N/a	35%	14%	20%
23–30 June	JL Partners	GB News	502	30%	—N/a	—N/a	30%	—N/a	—N/a	—N/a	20%	20%
23–30 June	JL Partners	GB News	502	34%	—N/a	24%	—N/a	—N/a	—N/a	—N/a	20%	22%
23–30 June	JL Partners	GB News	502	—N/a	—N/a	—N/a	31%	—N/a	—N/a	37%	15%	17%
23–30 June	JL Partners	GB News	502	—N/a	34%	—N/a	—N/a	—N/a	—N/a	39%	12%	15%
23–30 June	JL Partners	GB News	502	—N/a	—N/a	25%	31%	—N/a	—N/a	—N/a	25%	19%
23–30 June	JL Partners	GB News	502	—N/a	—N/a	29%	—N/a	—N/a	35%	—N/a	16%	20%

Top candidates polling

Dates conducted	Pollster	Client	Sample size	Kemi Badenoch	Suella Braverman	Tom Tugendhat	Robert Jenrick	Priti Patel	Don't know
16–19 July 2024	Techne (Note: Party members were asked to rank the 5 candidates. These results show what percentage of Conservative members put the candidate in their top 4.)	College Green Group	1,002	52%	45%	52%	55%	47%	30%

=== 2019 Conservative voters ===
Multi-candidate polling

Dates conducted	Pollster	Client	Sample size	Penny Mordaunt (Note: This MP lost their seat at the 2024 general election, and was therefore ineligible to stand)	Jeremy Hunt	Suella Braverman	Jacob Rees-Mogg	Kemi Badenoch	Grant Shapps	Others	None	Don't know
13–20 June 2024	Deltapoll	Helm Partners	1,511	25%	13%	10%	6%	4%	3%	—N/a	19%	20%

=== General public ===
==== National polling under potential leaders ====
Electoral Calculus conducted a multilevel regression with poststratification (MRP) opinion poll from 11 to 15 October 2024 on behalf of Jack Lewy of the Robert Jenrick campaign, asking the general public how they would vote if respectively Kemi Badenoch or Robert Jenrick were elected leader of the Conservatives. The results showed that Jenrick would perform slightly better in a general election than Badenoch.

Dates conducted	Pollster	Client	Area	Sample size	Implied Conservative leader		Lab	Con	Lib Dems	SNP	Reform	Green	Plaid Cymru	Others	Majority / lead
11–15 October 2024	Find Out Now/Electoral Calculus (MRP)	Jack Lewy / Robert Jenrick	GB	6,289	Kemi Badenoch	Seats	332	151	63	48	25	4	4	5	Labour majority of 14
11–15 October 2024	Find Out Now/Electoral Calculus (MRP)	Jack Lewy / Robert Jenrick	GB	6,289	Kemi Badenoch	Vote share	29%	22%	12%	4%	21%	10%	1%	1%	7%
11–15 October 2024	Find Out Now/Electoral Calculus (MRP)	Jack Lewy / Robert Jenrick	GB	6,289	Robert Jenrick	Seats	311	178	58	48	24	4	4	5	Hung (Labour 15 short)
11–15 October 2024	Find Out Now/Electoral Calculus (MRP)	Jack Lewy / Robert Jenrick	GB	6,289	Robert Jenrick	Vote share	28%	23%	12%	4%	20%	11%	1%	1%	5%

Multi-candidate polling

Dates conducted	Pollster	Client	Sample size	Kemi Badenoch	James Cleverly	Robert Jenrick	Priti Patel	Mel Stride	Tom Tugendhat	Suella Braverman	Others	Don't know/ NOTA
4–7 October 2024	Deltapoll	N/A	2,108	7%	13%	8%	—N/a	—N/a	9%	—N/a	—N/a	62%
14–16 August 2024	Opinium	The Observer	2,050	5%	6%	2%	7%	2%	6%	—N/a	—N/a	72%
5–7 August 2024	BMG Research	The i	1,523	4%	8%	5%	6%	2%	6%	—N/a	—N/a	69%
31 July – 2 August 2024	Opinium	The Observer	2,063	6%	7%	3%	7%	2%	7%	—N/a	—N/a	69%
17–19 July 2024	Opinium	The Observer	2,050	5%	8%	3%	5%	—N/a	6%	8%	6%	60%
21–25 June 2024	JL Partners	GB News	8,030	7%	—N/a	6%	7%	—N/a	9%	10%	—N/a	61%

== Results ==
Declaration of the election results on 2 November 2024

Incumbent leader Rishi Sunak did not vote in the ballots.

Candidate	MPs' 1st ballot: 4 September 2024		MPs' 2nd ballot: 10 September 2024			MPs' 3rd ballot: 8 October 2024			MPs' 4th ballot: 9 October 2024			Members' vote: 10–31 October	
Candidate	Votes	% (Note: Percentage of voting electorate for candidates, percentage of total electorate for votes cast.)	Votes	±	%	Votes	±	%	Votes	±	%	Votes	%
Kemi Badenoch	22	18.6	28	▲6	23.5	30	▲2	25.2	42	▲12	34.7	53,806	56.5
Robert Jenrick	28	23.7	33	▲5	27.7	31	▼2	26.1	41	▲10	33.9	41,388	43.5
James Cleverly	21	17.8	21	Steady	17.6	39	▲18	32.8	37	▼2	30.6	Eliminated	
Tom Tugendhat	17	14.4	21	▲4	17.6	20	▼1	16.8	Eliminated				
Mel Stride	16	13.6	16	Steady	13.4	Eliminated							
Priti Patel	14	11.9	Eliminated										
Votes cast	118	97.5	119	▲1	98.3	120	▲1	99.2	120	Steady	99.2	95,194	72.8
Abstentions	3	2.5	2	▼1	1.7	1	▼1	0.8	1	Steady	0.8		
Registered voters	121	100.0	121	0	100.0	121	0	100.0	121	0	100.0	131,680	100.0
