= Aris Roussinos =

British journalist and editor

- Occupations: Journalist and filmmaker
- Employer: UnHerd

Aristeides John Roussinos is a British freelance journalist and author. Roussinos covered various conflicts across the Middle East and North Africa as a war correspondent since the beginning of the Arab Spring in 2011 for Vice Media. He is currently employed as a regular columnist for UnHerd and his work has appeared in The Times, Tablet, and The Independent. His first book, Rebels: My Life Behind Enemy Lines with Warlords, Fanatics and Not-so-Friendly Fire, was published by Penguin Random House in 2014.

== Early life and education ==
Roussinos was educated at Haberdashers' Aske's Boys' School, Durham University (BA Anthropology, 2004) and the University of Oxford (MSc Social and Cultural Anthropology, 2005).

== Career ==
Roussinos was awarded the 2013 Rory Peck Award for News, for his report Ground Zero Mali: The Battle of Gao.

During the Arab Spring Roussinos travelled extensively with Islamic Front in Syria, anti-government fighters in Libya, as well as travelling to Mali, Sudan, South Sudan and Lebanon.

In August 2022, Roussinos published an essay in UnHerd titled "It's time for Anglofuturism", which has been credited with popularising the concept of Anglofuturism in British political commentary.

== Publications ==
- The Ghosts of Aleppo, Vice News, video series.
- Roussinos, Aris (2014). Rebels: My Life Behind Enemy Lines with Warlords, Fanatics and Not-so-Friendly Fire. London: Penguin Random House. ISBN 978-1-78089-218-4.

== Family life ==
Roussinos' mother died of a brain tumour while he was working in Libya, although he was able to travel home to see her before she died.
