= Anglofuturism =

British political and cultural movement

Anglofuturism is a British political and cultural movement that pairs traditional British aesthetics with support for technological development, infrastructure expansion, and state capacity. Emerging online in the early 2020s, the concept developed into a cross-party pro-growth policy discourse advocated by journalists, researchers, and YIMBY campaigners, while drawing scrutiny from commentators over its coherence as a governing agenda and its overlap with online subcultures.

== History ==
Visual precursors of Anglofuturism circulated on Twitter around 2021 through accounts sharing solarpunk and neo-Victorian imagery of futuristic British cities, The term itself was coined in 2021 by Alice Earendel, in the Progressive Nationalism sphere on Twitter. Roussinos popularised the term in mainstream political commentary in August 2022 via an UnHerd column calling for a developmental model focused on domestic industrial capacity.

From 2024, the concept broadened into a cross-partisan policy movement centred on economic growth, energy abundance, and institutional reform. In May 2024, journalist Tom Ough, engineer Calum Drysdale, and producer Aeron Laffere launched the Anglofuturism podcast, with Ough and Drysdale publishing essays in CapX, The Spectator, and Palladium Magazine advocating planning deregulation, scientific funding, commercial spaceflight, and the development of the British Antarctic Territory. Guests on the podcast have included neoreactionary theorist Curtis Yarvin, former UKIP MP Douglas Carswell, Labour MP Dan Tomlinson, UCL professor Philip Cunliffe and Aria Babu.

During 2025, the label was adopted across different parts of the British political spectrum. In June 2025, Robert Jenrick—then the Conservative Shadow Secretary of State for Justice—described himself at a Westminster conference as "an Anglofuturist". Over the same period, Anglofuturist themes were taken up by non-partisan pro-growth groups such as Looking for Growth and infrastructure campaigns including "Forest City 1", a proposal co-founded by former Guardian journalist Shiv Malik and entrepreneur Joseph Reeve to build a 400,000-home city featuring mass-timber architecture on the Suffolk–Cambridgeshire border, between Haverhill and Newmarket. In November 2025, Laffere published an essay in the New Statesman setting out a progressive case for Anglofuturism, arguing that industrial ambition and state capacity were non-partisan goals.

== Themes and reception ==
Policy proposals associated with Anglofuturism focus on overhauling planning laws, building high-speed rail and dense housing, expanding artificial intelligence and biotechnology research, reviving traditional British architectural styles, and deploying small modular reactors across English towns. Writing in British GQ, Josiah Gogarty placed the movement on the "slightly more optimistic end of the spectrum" of emerging British political forces, while ConservativeHome commentator Peter Franklin noted its appeal as an answer to British state paralysis and Chinese technological competition ("Sinofuturism").

Academic and journalistic observers have offered contrasting assessments of the movement's variants and political viability. In a study of the Advanced Research and Invention Agency (ARIA) for the journal Politics, political scientist Francesca Melhuish analysed Anglofuturism as a post-Brexit political imaginary blending nostalgia for a "new Elizabethan age" with technological modernism, cautioning that certain strands of its pursuit of scientific prestige risked mainstreaming far-right race science. An October 2025 HOPE not hate report similarly distinguished mainstream pro-growth technological optimism from a separate online subculture—such as The Anglofuturist Substack—a separate publication from the podcast's newsletter of the same name, run by Aidan Todd—which it argued promoted hard-right nationalism. According to the report, the Substack's 13-point manifesto and its essay 'What Is To Be Done?' called for "racial consciousness in straight White men", working with neo-Nazis, a race-driven immigration policy, and the rehabilitation of Adolf Hitler. The report also described Alexander d'Albini's Collected Essays on AngloFuturism Philosophy, published in December 2024, as "the only book published on the subject of Anglofuturism".

In Prospect in June 2026, Benjamin Clark questioned whether an internet aesthetic reliant on generative artificial intelligence imagery could translate into coherent public policy. Conversely, writing in The Critic in August 2026, Martin Beaver argued that Anglofuturism's evolution into a mainstream, cross-party growth brand had stripped the discourse of its earlier cultural nationalism.

== See also ==
- Archeofuturism
- Effective accelerationism
- Progress studies
- Sinofuturism
- YIMBY
