= Robert Jenrick =

British politician (born 1982)

The Right Honourable Robert Jenrick MP
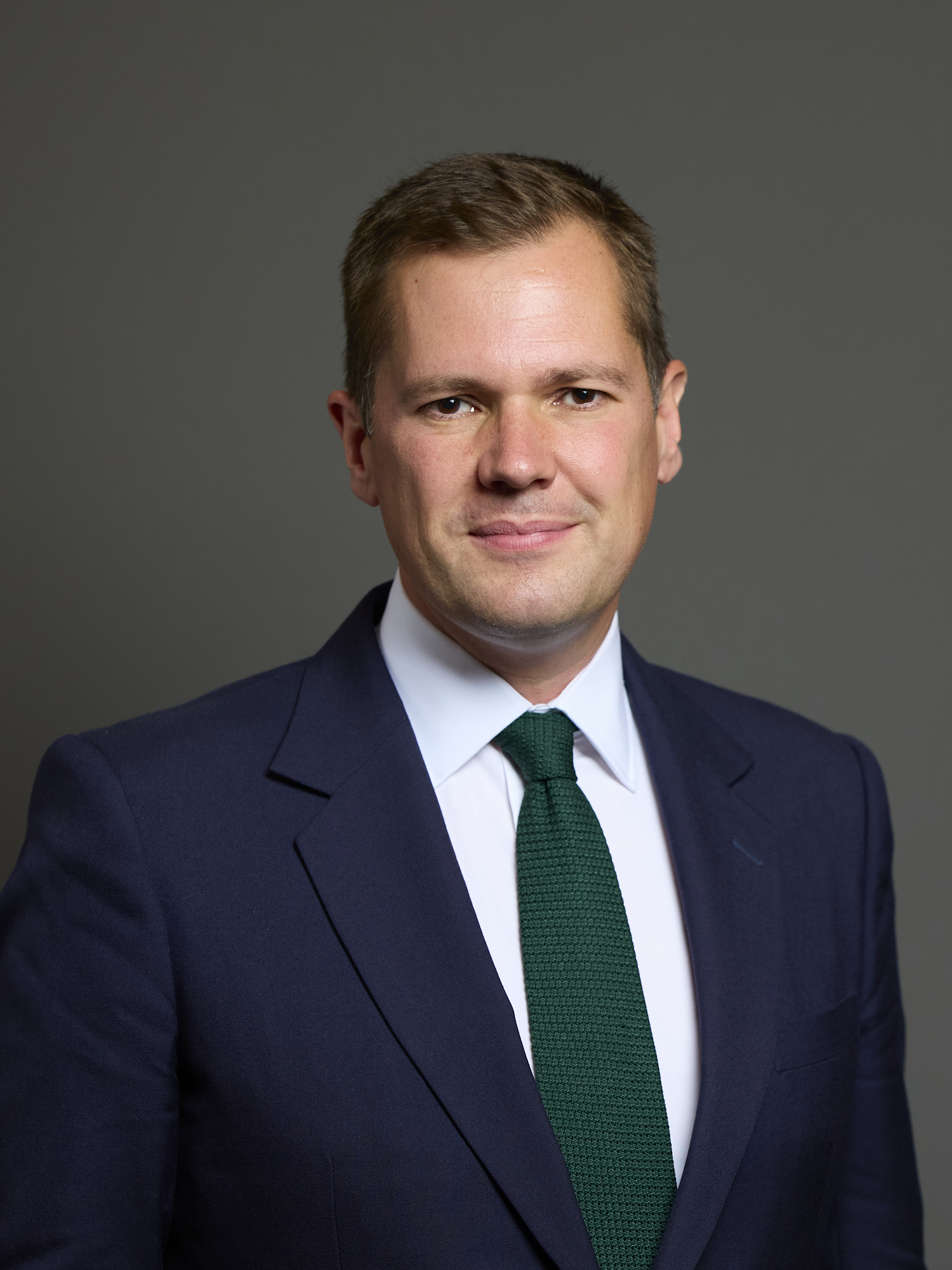
- Official portrait, 2024

Reform UK Treasury Spokesperson
- Incumbent
- Assumed office 17 February 2026
- Leader: Nigel Farage
- Preceded by: Position established

Shadow Secretary of State for Justice Shadow Lord Chancellor
- In office 4 November 2024 – 15 January 2026
- Leader: Kemi Badenoch
- Preceded by: Edward Argar
- Succeeded by: Nick Timothy
Ministerial positions
Minister of State for Immigration
In office 25 October 2022 – 6 December 2023
Prime Minister	Rishi Sunak
Preceded by	Tom Pursglove
Succeeded by	Tom Pursglove (Legal Migration and the Border)
Minister of State for Health and Social Care
In office 7 September 2022 – 25 October 2022
Prime Minister	Liz Truss
Preceded by	Gillian Keegan
Succeeded by	Helen Whately
Secretary of State for Housing, Communities and Local Government
In office 24 July 2019 – 15 September 2021
Prime Minister	Boris Johnson
Preceded by	James Brokenshire
Succeeded by	Michael Gove
Exchequer Secretary to the Treasury
In office 9 January 2018 – 24 July 2019
Prime Minister	Theresa May
Preceded by	Andrew Jones
Succeeded by	Simon Clarke

Member of Parliament for Newark
- Incumbent
- Assumed office 5 June 2014
- Preceded by: Patrick Mercer
- Majority: 3,572 (6.7%)

Personal details
- Born: Robert Edward Jenrick; 9 January 1982 (age 44) Wolverhampton, West Midlands, England
- Party: Reform UK (since 2026)
- Other political affiliations: Conservative (1997–2026)
- Spouse: Michal Berkner (m. 2009)
- Children: 3
- Education: Wolverhampton Grammar School; St John's College, Cambridge (BA); University of Pennsylvania (MA); The College of Law (GDL); BPP University (LPC)
- Occupation: Politician; solicitor
- Website: robertjenrick.com

Robert Edward Jenrick (born 9 January 1982) is an English politician who has been Member of Parliament (MP) for Newark since the 2014 by-election. Elected as a member of the Conservative Party, he joined Reform in January 2026.

He served in the Cabinet as Minister of State for Immigration from 2022 to 2023 in the Sunak ministry and as Secretary of State for Housing, Communities and Local Government from 2019 to 2021 in the first and second Johnson ministries. He also served as Exchequer Secretary to the Treasury from 2018 to 2019 in the second May ministry and as Minister of State for Health from September to October 2022 in the Truss ministry. In opposition, he served in the Badenoch shadow cabinet as Shadow Secretary of State for Justice and Shadow Lord Chancellor from 2024 until 2026.

Born in Wolverhampton, Jenrick attended St John's College, Cambridge, where he read history, followed by the University of Pennsylvania, where he studied political science. He then studied law, qualified as a solicitor, and practised corporate law with Skadden Arps and Sullivan & Cromwell in London and Moscow. He was elected as the MP for Newark at the 2014 by-election following the resignation of the Conservative Patrick Mercer after a cash-for-lobbying scandal. From 2015 to 2018 Jenrick was Parliamentary Private Secretary to Esther McVey, Michael Gove and Liz Truss, and Amber Rudd. He served as Exchequer Secretary to the Treasury under Chancellor of the Exchequer Philip Hammond from 2018 to 2019. In July 2019, Boris Johnson appointed Jenrick to be Secretary of State for Housing, Communities and Local Government; he held this position until he was dismissed in September 2021.

Jenrick returned to government in September 2022 as Minister of State for Health under Truss and was appointed to a cabinet attending role as Minister of State for Immigration by Rishi Sunak the following month. On 6 December 2023 Jenrick resigned from his position as Minister of State for Immigration over "strong disagreements" with the government's Rwanda asylum plan, arguing that it did not go far enough to tackle illegal immigration, and spent the remainder of Sunak's premiership on the backbenches. Following the Labour Party's victory in the 2024 general election, Jenrick launched a bid to become Leader of the Conservative Party, eventually coming second to Kemi Badenoch.

In January 2026 Jenrick lost his party whip and was subsequently dismissed from Badenoch's Shadow Cabinet due to irrefutable evidence that he was secretly planning on defecting to Reform UK in an attempt to hurt the Conservative Party. He subsequently became the party's Treasury Spokesperson in Nigel Farage's frontbench team.

== Early life and non-political career ==
Robert Edward Jenrick was born on 9 January 1982 in Wolverhampton. He grew up in Shifnal, Shropshire near the town of Telford. His father was the Financial Controller of the English Electric Cooker Company and, later, the managing director of Cannon Industries.

Jenrick was privately educated at Wolverhampton Grammar School before reading history at St John's College, Cambridge, graduating in 2003 with a First Class Bachelor of Arts degree. He obtained a Thouron Award to study political science at the University of Pennsylvania from 2003 to 2004. He subsequently studied law, gaining a Graduate Diploma in Law from The College of Law in 2005 and completing a legal practice course at BPP Law School in 2006.

Jenrick qualified as a solicitor in 2008 and practised corporate law with Skadden Arps and Sullivan & Cromwell in London and Moscow. He met his future wife, Michal Berkner, when they both practised at Skadden Arps.

Immediately prior to being elected to the House of Commons, Jenrick was a director of Christie's, an auction house.

== Parliamentary career ==
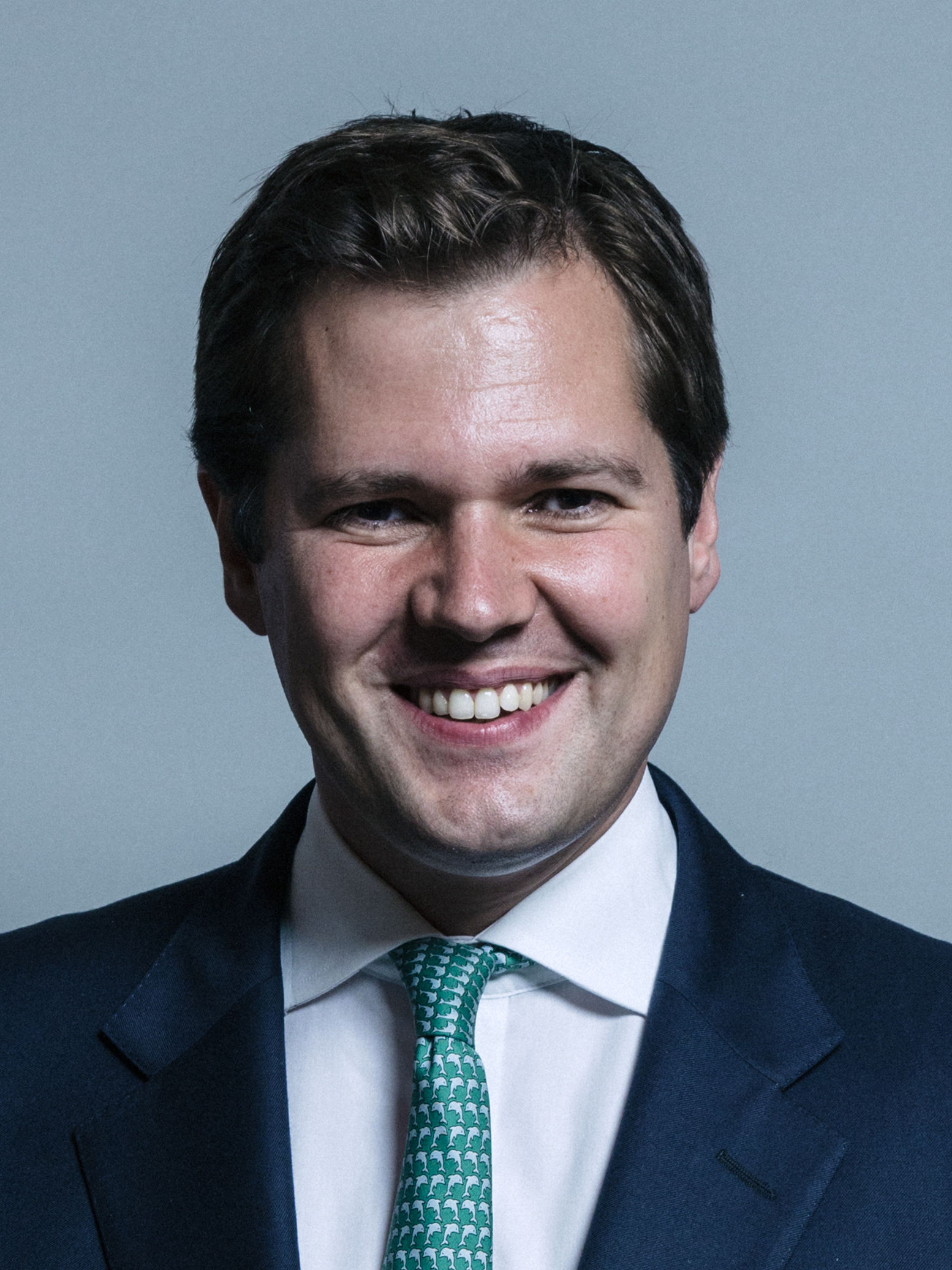
Official portrait, 2017

=== Early career ===
At the 2010 general election Jenrick contested Newcastle-under-Lyme for the Conservatives, but lost to the incumbent Labour Party MP Paul Farrelly by 1,582 votes.

In November 2013 Jenrick was selected to contest the parliamentary constituency by-election for Newark, where the sitting Conservative MP, Patrick Mercer, had resigned following a cash-for-lobbying scandal. During the campaign Jenrick was criticised by the UK Independence Party's candidate, Roger Helmer, for owning several properties. Chris Grayling, the justice secretary, defended Jenrick, stating that being self-made and successful was nothing to be ashamed of. At the by-election, held on 5 June 2014, he won with a majority of 7,403.

In February 2016 Channel 4 News alleged overspending in Jenrick's by-election victory. Jenrick said he was confident his election expenses had been compiled in compliance with the law. Nottinghamshire Police took no action as too much time had passed since the alleged offence. In March 2017 the Electoral Commission released a report on their investigation into spending allegations at a number of elections. They concluded that the Conservative Party had contravened the spending rules three times (including in the 2014 Newark by-election) and committed offences twice, and accordingly fined the party £70,000.

Shortly after his election, Jenrick was elected to the Health and Social Care Select Committee. In February 2015 he was appointed Parliamentary Private Secretary (PPS) to the minister of state for employment at the Department for Work and Pensions, Esther McVey. Jenrick was returned at the 2015 general election with a majority of 18,474, or 57 per cent of the vote, the largest majority in the history of his constituency of Newark and the largest swing of any Conservative MP in that election. In May 2015 he was appointed PPS to the Lord Chancellor and Secretary of State for Justice, Michael Gove, and continued to fulfil the role under Gove's successor, Liz Truss, from July 2016. Jenrick was opposed to Brexit prior to the 2016 UK referendum. Jenrick has been Chair of the All Party Parliamentary Group (APPG) on International Trade & Investment and Vice-Chairman of the Groups on China and France.

At the snap 2017 general election Jenrick was again returned, increasing his vote share to 62.7 per cent while his majority dipped to 18,149. Afterwards he was appointed PPS to Home Secretary Amber Rudd. As Chairman of the APPG for the Prevention of Genocide and Crimes against Humanity, Jenrick, along with Rudd, met Nadia Murad, an Iraqi Yazidi human rights activist who in 2018 was awarded the Nobel Peace Prize, to discuss how the UK could help with the reconstruction of Yazidi areas. In July 2017 Jenrick was elected by his fellow-MPs to be their representative on the Board of the Conservative Party. He was appointed Exchequer Secretary to the Treasury by Prime Minister Theresa May in her reshuffle of January 2018. In June 2019 he represented the British Government at the Israel-Palestine peace initiative, led by Jared Kushner.

=== Secretary of State for Housing, Communities and Local Government (2019–2021) ===
After Boris Johnson became prime minister following the 2019 Conservative leadership election, Jenrick was appointed Secretary of State for Housing, Communities and Local Government on 24 July 2019, becoming the youngest member of Johnson's Cabinet.

On 26 July 2019 Jenrick, whose wife and children are Jewish, said, "I want tackling antisemitism and ensuring that the Jewish community feels protected and respected to be one of my priorities as Secretary of State." In September 2019 he said, "I will use my position as Secretary of State to write to all universities and local authorities to insist that they adopt the IHRA definition at the earliest opportunity... and use it when considering matters such as disciplinary procedures. Failure to act in this regard is unacceptable."

At the 2019 general election, Jenrick was again returned, increasing his share of the vote to 63.3 per cent and increasing his majority to 21,816. In January 2020 he spoke at the Conservative Friends of Israel parliamentary reception and told the audience that he would "look forward to the day" when Britain's embassy in Israel will be "moved to Jerusalem", adding that "as Housing Secretary I don't like land-banking. I want us to build that embassy." The government had not indicated it would move its embassy from Tel Aviv to Jerusalem, as the United States did in 2018. The Palestine Solidarity Campaign (PSC) called on Johnson to dismiss Jenrick, adding "no minister who openly advocates for law-breaking is fit to serve in Government".

His response to the national crisis with respect to housing safety following the Grenfell Tower fire was criticised as demonstrating a misunderstanding of the issue. His approach, which was said to include "naming and shaming", was seen by some as lacking robustness and ineffective. Jenrick was criticised as having failed to deliver on promises and take concrete action. There were over ten significant, life-threatening fires after Grenfell, including the Bolton Cube fire. Thousands of affected residents continued to face financial burdens and their lives remained at risk. This stood in contrast to the more effective measures put in place by the Australian Government to keep its citizens safe.

In February 2020, in a survey of leaseholders from 117 housing developments by the Leasehold Knowledge Partnership, a charity that supports leaseholders, 90 per cent of respondents said the government's response to the "cladding crisis" had been "no help at all". In October 2020 it was estimated that 700,000 people were still living in flats wrapped in flammable materials, and 3.6 million had fire-related defects and faced a wait of 10 years before they could sell their flat or get a new mortgage.

In April 2020 The Sunday Times reported Jenrick had charged taxpayers more than £100,000 for "a third home" in his constituency of Newark which he appeared to use only rarely. In November 2020 the Public Accounts Committee concluded that Jenrick's constituency had been awarded funding by his department as part of a process that was opaque and not impartial.

==== Travel during COVID-19 pandemic ====
During the COVID-19 pandemic in April 2020, after Jenrick repeatedly urged the public at televised press briefings to stay at home during the government-imposed lockdown to curb the spread of COVID-19, the Daily Mail alleged on 10 April that he had twice not followed government restrictions after they were announced.

The first event was travelling 150 miles from London to a second home in Herefordshire, Eye Manor, where he was now living with his family. Jenrick's primary residence was his townhouse in Central London, where his wife worked and his three children attended school. Jenrick defended this, reiterating he was travelling to his family home, where his family were before any restrictions on travel were announced. The second event was travelling 40 miles to see his parents near Shrewsbury in Shropshire. He defended this, stating his parents had asked him to deliver some essentials, including medicines, and he had not entered the house. This position was supported by the emeritus director of Public Health England. Previously, on 22 March 2020, he had written an article for The Mail on Sunday arguing that rather than relatives travelling, local communities should help out.

Several MPs called for Jenrick to consider his position, given his high-profile role in Downing Street's campaign to keep the British public inside during the outbreak, including the ban on travelling to second homes. He was accused by Anna Soubry of "selfish arrogance".

==== Planning issues ====
In June 2020 Jenrick faced questions over his links to a Conservative donor after it emerged that he met an Israeli businessman, Idan Ofer, with an interest in the future of a multibillion-pound project that Jenrick, then Exchequer Secretary to the Treasury, was overseeing. Ofer stated that the £10,000 donation via his Quantum Pacific business was made at the behest of Conservative Friends of Israel, of which Jenrick was a member. Jenrick later said that Ofer was a family friend. The same month, it was reported that Conservative councillors approved a planning application for an extension to Jenrick's townhouse despite officials objecting to the scheme three times over its damaging impact in a conservation area.

In March 2019 Jenrick's predecessor James Brokenshire had decided that a planning application for a new 17-storey tower in Notting Hill which had been rejected three times by the Royal Borough of Kensington and Chelsea should be referred to him instead of being dealt with by the Greater London Authority. In June 2020, on the advice of a planning inspector, Jenrick granted permission for the tower. The decision was described by Kensington and Chelsea's lead councillor for planning as a "major blow to local residents", as the development would "cause harm to our unique borough and, in particular, nearby listed buildings and conservation areas". In his decision letter Jenrick had agreed that the proposals would damage the significance of the area's local heritage, but he found that the effect on the townscape would be "neutral-to-beneficial" and that "the provision of housing attracts very significant weight".

In July 2020 Alan Jones, the president of the Royal Institute of British Architects, condemned Jenrick's proposals to extend Permitted Development Rights. In an open letter, he stated: "The extension of this policy is truly disgraceful. There is no evidence that the planning system is to blame for the shortage of housing, and plenty to suggest that leaving local communities powerless in the face of developers seeking short-term returns will lead to poor results." Jones also argued that the proposals contradicted the Government's own advisors "who had concluded that permitted development had 'permissioned future slums'– allowing sub-standard homes to be built with little to no natural light and smaller than budget hotel rooms." Jones instead recommended that changes should be made to taxation and funding systems to incentivise investment in sustainable buildings, whilst also improving minimum space standards. He confirmed he would be writing to Jenrick as a matter of urgency and the letter would also be signed by Chartered Institute of Building, the Royal Institution of Chartered Surveyors and the Royal Town Planning Institute.

In January 2021 Jenrick declined the request of Tim Farron, the MP for Westmorland and Lonsdale for the Liberal Democrats, to call in for review plans for Whitehaven coal mine, the first new deep coal mine in the UK in 30 years, after Cumbria County Council approved the plan. Farron described the coal mine as a "complete disaster for our children's future" and that "it's utter and rank hypocrisy for this Conservative Government to claim one minute that they care about protecting our environment, and in the next give the green light to a deep coal mine." West Cumbria Mining said it would create 500 jobs and pay into a community fund for 10 years.

==== Unlawful approval of Westferry housing development ====
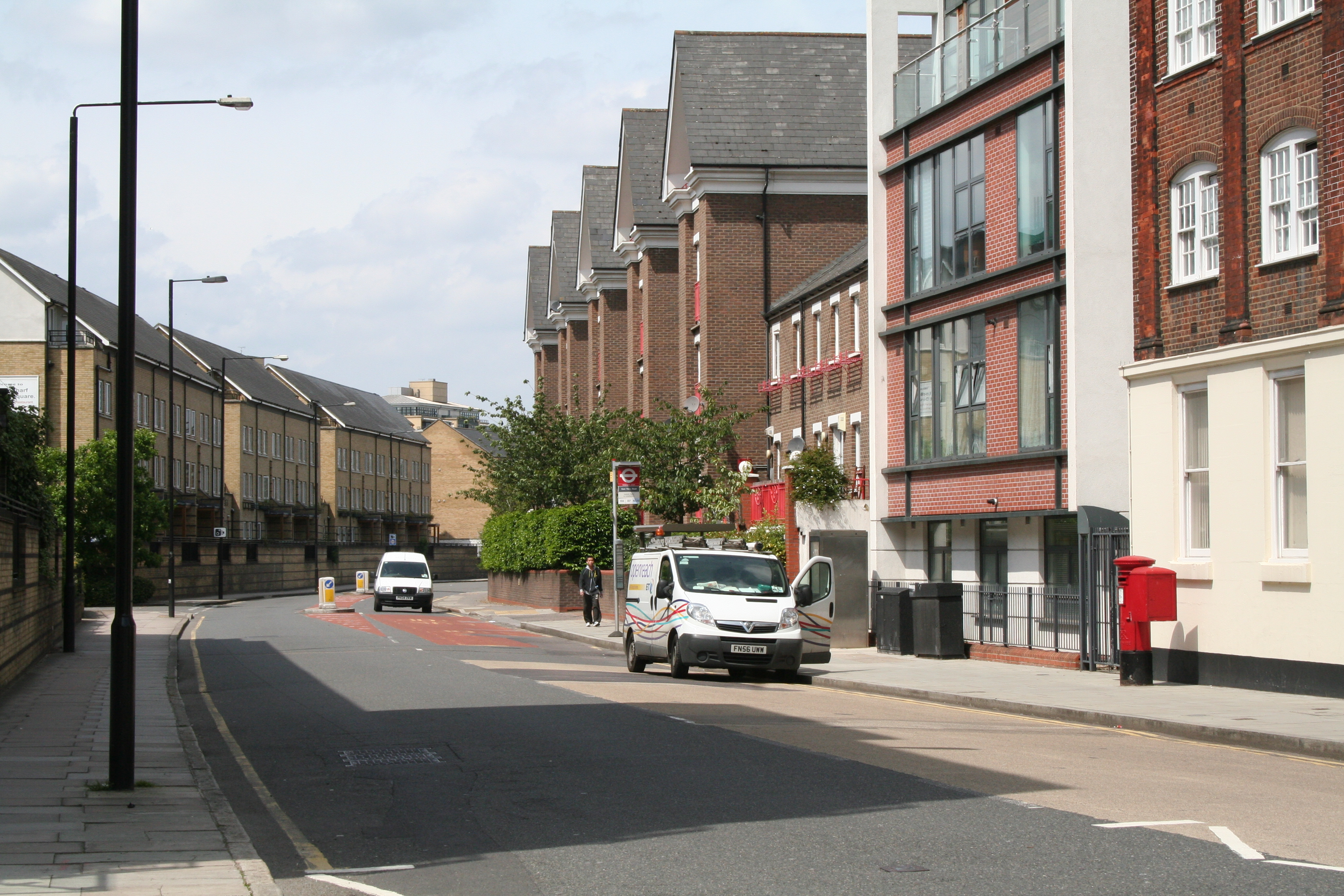
Westferry Road, Isle of Dogs, in 2012.

In January 2020 Jenrick approved a £1 billion luxury housing development of 1,500 homes on Westferry Road, Isle of Dogs, as a favour to Richard Desmond, a Conservative Party donor, businessman and former pornographer.

Jenrick approved the scheme on 14 January knowing that an approval by that date would enable Desmond to avoid having to pay a council-imposed infrastructure levy of between £30 million and £50 million.

A Government planning inspector had advised against permitting the scheme, as it would not deliver enough affordable housing and as the height of the tower would be detrimental to the character of the area. Other civil servants had also advised Jenrick not to approve the scheme.

Tower Hamlets London Borough Council then pursued a judicial review against Jenrick's decision in the High Court, arguing that it had shown bias towards Desmond. It was also reported that Jenrick had helped Desmond to save an additional £106 million by allowing affordable housing at 21 per cent, instead of enforcing the local and London-wide planning policy requirement of 35 per cent. This could have resulted in a total discount (and subsequent loss of revenue to the Exchequer) of approximately £150 million.

In May 2020 Jenrick did not contest the judicial review, conceding that his sign-off of the scheme was "unlawful by reason of apparent bias". He also confirmed that his approval had deliberately been issued before the new CIL policy could be adopted. This meant that Jenrick was able to avoid disclosing correspondence relating to the application in open court. His planning permission was quashed by the High Court, which ordered that the matter was to be decided by a different minister. Jenrick maintained that although the decision had been "unlawful by reason of apparent bias", there had been no "actual bias". Desmond, whose company had donated to the Conservative Party in 2017, made a further personal donation to the party shortly after the approval was given. Andrew Wood, an independent councillor, had resigned from the Conservative Party over the property deal. The planning decision was re-determined by a different Government minister. In conceding the move did show "apparent bias", Jenrick effectively blocked the judicial review, which originally prevented documents between his department and the developer from being made public.

In June 2020 Desmond told The Sunday Times he had lobbied Jenrick at a Conservative Party fundraising dinner held at the Savoy Hotel in November. He said he had shown Jenrick "three or four minutes" of a promotional video for the Westferry Printworks development on his mobile phone, adding "he got the gist".

The interview was followed by a Labour Party opposition day motion debate in the House of Commons on 24 June, which forced Jenrick into releasing all "relevant" documents surrounding his dealings with Desmond, including private text messages between him and the developer that show discussion of the then live planning application beginning the night of the fundraising dinner. One of the emails revealed that Ministry of Housing, Communities and Local Government (MHCLG) officials were being pressured by Jenrick to work out how to overrule the Government's own planning inspector so he could approve the plans before any increase in the Tower Hamlets council community infrastructure levy (CIL), which Desmond would have had to pay. That Jenrick did not disclose to his department his potential conflict of interest until a month after his dinner raised concern. The release of the documents led to calls for Jenrick's resignation for his use of a public office for political favours. Cabinet Secretary Mark Sedwill said the prime minister (Boris Johnson) "considered the matter closed" following the publication of the documents.

In August 2020, members of Grenfell United refused an invitation to have a meeting with Jenrick due to the slow progress of enforcing the findings of the first phase of the Grenfell Tower Inquiry, a lack of progress on reforming social housing and his controversy with Desmond.

The project was subsequently refused planning permission in 2021, but was approved in August 2024.

==== Holocaust memorial ====
In June 2020 Jenrick was described by Ruth Deech, Baroness Deech, as breaching "the guidance on planning propriety" over his management of a planning application to build a national Holocaust memorial, which she described as controversial. The MHCLG, Jenrick's department, took control of the approval process from Westminster Council days after he met the project's main backers, including Gerald Ronson. The planning application was called in by Jenrick in November 2019; this was hours before Parliament was dissolved, and three months before Westminster Council unanimously rejected the scheme. The application was submitted in 2018 by the UK Holocaust Memorial Foundation, an organisation sponsored by the MHCLG.

In July 2020 Jenrick faced High Court action brought by the London Parks & Gardens Trust over his handling of the Holocaust memorial planning application and decision to allow his junior colleague, housing minister Christopher Pincher, to determine the fate of the application. Jenrick's decision stripped Westminster City Council of its power to rule on the £102 million project – which was to be built in Victoria Tower Gardens – a grade II listed park near the Palace of Westminster, which the trust said was "the last piece of publicly accessible land in central London".

==== Dismissal by Johnson ====
On 15 September 2021 it was announced that Jenrick had been dismissed as Communities Secretary after Boris Johnson had reshuffled his cabinet, and had been succeeded by Michael Gove (Chancellor of the Duchy of Lancaster).

=== Ministerial career (2022–2023) ===
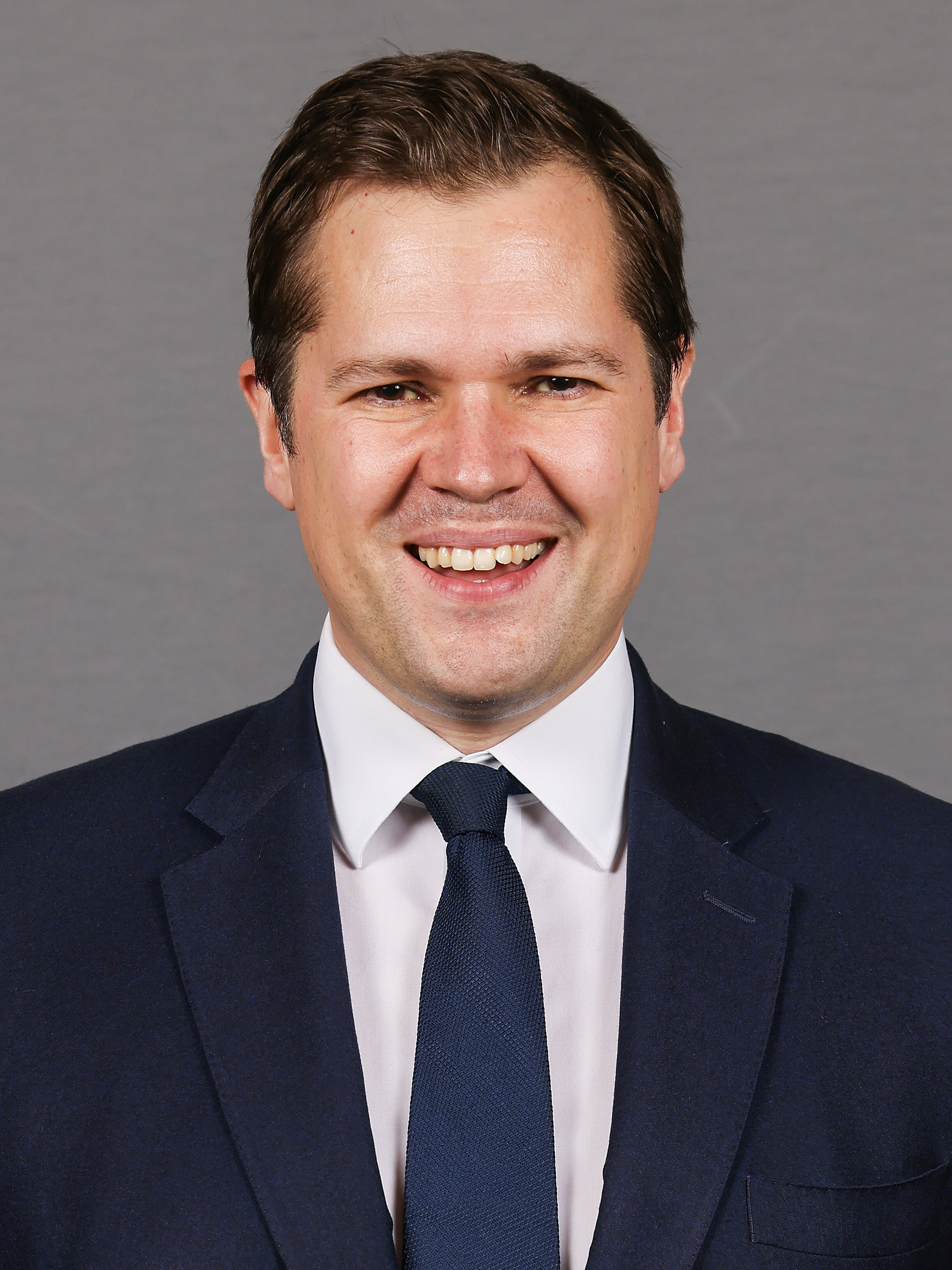
Official portrait, October 2022

In September 2022 Jenrick was appointed Minister of State for Health and Social Care. In October 2022 Jenrick was appointed Minister of State for Immigration, a cabinet attending role, by Prime Minister Rishi Sunak. That same month, Jenrick agreed to visit the Home Office facility in Manston, Kent, after the Independent Inspector of Borders David Neal said to MPs the situation at the centre was "wretched". In February 2023, Jenrick said in a debate in the House of Commons that the Home Office was "monitoring the activities" of human rights lawyers in the United Kingdom, stating that human rights lawyers "exploit and abuse our laws".

On 23 November 2022, Conservative MP Philip Hollobone criticised Jenrick in the House of Commons, saying that the Home Office's handling of relocating asylum seekers to hotels was "so bad and chaotic that the Minister should consider his position" and that he had "no confidence" the Home Office and its contractors "have the first clue what they are doing". In March 2023 Jenrick said that asylum seekers should be housed "in the most basic accommodation possible, including disused army bases and possibly ships, to save money and to dissuade people from coming to the UK." He said in the Commons that, "We must not elevate the wellbeing of illegal migrants above those of the British people". He further stated that "Accommodation for migrants should meet their essential living needs and nothing more. Because we cannot risk becoming a magnet for the millions of people who are displaced and seeking better economic prospects." Jenrick stated in April 2023 that protests against asylum seekers being housed in hotels, such as those in Knowsley, Liverpool, which saw far-right demonstrators clash with police, are a "warning to be heeded, not a phenomenon to be managed" by ministers.

In April 2023 the government announced that it had leased a barge to house 500 migrants on its southern coast as part of efforts to reduce the use of costly hotels as temporary accommodation while asylum claims were being processed. Jenrick defended the policy, stating that it was necessary in order "to save the British taxpayer money and to prevent the UK becoming a magnet for asylum shoppers in Europe." The Bibby Stockholm, which was scheduled to be operational for at least 18 months, was intended to provide basic accommodation and healthcare, catering facilities and round-the-clock security.

Defending the Conservative government's Illegal Migration Bill in Parliament, Jenrick said in April 2023 that refugees crossing the English Channel "cannibalise" communities by importing "different lifestyles and values", which he said undermines "cultural cohesiveness" and that the "nation has a right to preserve itself." He added, "Whilst it's impossible to determine the exact numbers, the basic fact is undeniable that the number of people who are willing and able to reach the UK today is astronomical and vastly outnumbers what we are capable or willing to take as a country." Jenrick said in May 2023 that "The refugee convention... says that people should seek sanctuary, should seek asylum in the first safe country." The United Nations High Commissioner for Refugees previously stated in 2021 that there is a misunderstanding that asylum-seekers "should claim asylum in the first safe country they reach."

Jenrick was criticised in July 2023 by Sir Robert Chote, chairman of the British government's official Statistics Authority, for misleading parliament regarding modern slavery. Jenrick incorrectly told the House of Commons that "71 per cent of foreign national offenders in the detained estate, whom we are trying to remove from the country, are claiming to be modern slaves." Chote said that the Home Office's own report on the issue shows that around one fifth of foreign offenders convicted in the UK had been referred for modern slavery support, not the 71 per cent that Jenrick claimed.

In July 2023, it was reported that Jenrick told staff at an asylum reception centre designed for unaccompanied asylum-seeking children in Kent to paint over wall art depicting cartoons and animals such as Baloo from The Jungle Book and Mickey Mouse to provide a less welcoming atmosphere for children. The Home Office later confirmed that the cartoons had been painted over on 5 July. Jenrick said the cartoons were painted over as they were not "age appropriate" for teenagers in the asylum centre.

On 6 December 2023 Jenrick resigned from his position over "strong disagreements" with the government's response to problems with the Rwanda asylum plan, stating that the Safety of Rwanda (Asylum and Immigration) Bill "does not go far enough".

At the 2024 general election, Jenrick was again returned, with a decreased vote share of 39.2 per cent and a decreased majority of 3,572.

=== In opposition ===
Logo for Jenrick's 2024 leadership bid

In September 2024, Jenrick criticised Labour for "their rank hypocrisy" after reports showed that their new prime minister, Keir Starmer, had accepted over £100,000 in gifts since 2019, whilst they were complaining about other political parties doing the same thing.

Also in September, Jenrick was found to have accepted a £75,000 donation from Spott Fitness, a company based in the British Virgin Islands. On 30 September 2024, British businessman Phillip Ullmann said he had provided the donation through Spott Fitness but did not explain why he did not donate personally, as he has done for several other politicians.

=== Leadership challenge ===
On 25 July 2024 Jenrick announced he was standing in the leadership election to be the new Conservative Party leader. During the first MPs' ballot he won the most votes, at 28 votes. In the second MPs' ballot Jenrick remained as the frontrunner, winning 33 votes.

On 9 October 2024, Jenrick came second in the final round of MP voting in the Conservative Party leadership election, therefore making it through to the membership vote which would decide the winner. He lost that election, garnering 41,388 votes (43.5 per cent) compared to his opponent Kemi Badenoch who won with 53,806 votes (56.5-cent), thus making Badenoch Leader of the Conservative Party and Leader of the Opposition. Jenrick was subsequently appointed by Badenoch to the post of Shadow Secretary of State for Justice.

On 8 July 2026 the London Metropolitan Police stated that they were investigating whether donations made to Jenrick's campaign were from an impermissible foreign source, following a referral from the Electoral Commission on 6 January. Jenrick said the allegations were "entirely false" and that he had not yet spoken to the police.

=== Dismissal by Badenoch and defection to Reform UK ===
On 15 January 2026, Jenrick was sacked from his shadow cabinet role and had the Conservative Party whip removed by Badenoch, after she uncovered his plan to defect to Reform UK. Badenoch became aware of Jenrick's pending defection through copies of his speech and a media plan for his defection. She wrote on X:

I have sacked Robert Jenrick from the shadow cabinet, removed the whip and suspended his party membership with immediate effect.

I was presented with clear, irrefutable evidence that he was plotting in secret to defect in a way designed to be as damaging as possible to his shadow cabinet colleagues and the wider Conservative Party.

The British public are tired of political psychodrama and so am I. They saw too much of it in the last Government, they're seeing too much of it in THIS government.

I will not repeat those mistakes.

On being questioned about Jenrick's dismissal and defection rumours, Reform UK leader Nigel Farage said that he and Jenrick had been in communication, stating: "Was I on the verge of signing a document with him? No. But have we had conversations? Yes." Later that day Jenrick shared a stage with Farage at a press conference to announce that he had joined Reform UK. Farage confirmed they had been in contact with each other but Badenoch's actions that day had prompted Jenrick's ultimate decision and referred to it as "the latest Christmas present I’ve ever had."

Jenrick later confirmed to journalists that he had begun dialogue with senior Reform UK members in September 2025 and that initial discussions did not include plans to change parties, although he said resigning from the Conservatives was something he had "given a great deal of thought to over a very long time." He later outlined his reasons for leaving the Conservatives in a Daily Telegraph opinion column.

In his speech at the Reform UK press conference, Jenrick said the Conservative Party "isn't sorry, it doesn't get it, it hasn't changed, it won't change, it can't change." He furthermore said it was "in denial or being dishonest" about its record in government and said both the Conservative and Labour parties were "no longer fit for purpose." He also criticised the policies of Mel Stride and Priti Patel for their respective handling of welfare reform and immigration while in government and said that some members of the Badenoch shadow cabinet had said in private about Britain that "It is broken but we can't say so because the Conservative Party broke it."

Interviewed later, Badenoch was dismissive, saying: "It is not a blow to lose someone who lies to his colleagues" and "This has been a good day, bad people are leaving my party." Jenrick's defection came four days after Nadhim Zahawi announced his defection to Reform UK.

Following Jenrick's defection, reports emerged saying that notes of his aides' media plan had described him as "the new sheriff in town" and "the biggest defection story Reform has ever had (and likely ever will)". The notes were reported to have been annotated in Jenrick's own handwriting.

=== As a Reform MP ===
On 4 February 2026, Jenrick and Suella Braverman voted in favour of a government bill abolishing Universal Credit restrictions for families with more than two children (a policy which had been opposed by other members of Reform UK). The bill subsequently passed by 458 votes to 104. It was reported that Jenrick and Braverman had cast their votes accidentally after entering the wrong division lobby and becoming "trapped" when the doors were locked.

On 17 February 2026, Jenrick was appointed to Nigel Farage's frontbench team as Reform UK's spokesperson for the Treasury. It was also announced that Jenrick was selected to be Reform's Chancellor of the Exchequer if they win the UK's next General Election.

==== 2026 Reform conference attack comments ====
At the 2026 Reform UK conference, a female protestor was beaten by audience members. Jenrick reacted to the attack afterward by mocking her, saying "boohoo" in reaction to a video of the attack. He later justified the attack further, sympathizing with one of her attackers and saying the attacker should be given a medal.

== Political views ==
At the start of his tenure as a member of parliament, Jenrick was viewed as a centrist within the Conservative Party with ideas closer to centrist wing around former leader David Cameron. Jenrick has subsequently been described as adopting a more right-wing position, particularly on immigration, since the lead up to his unsuccessful leadership bid of the party in 2024. In June 2025, speaking at the Now and England conference, he stated that he could be "described as an Anglofuturist".

=== 10 principles ===
In August 2024 Jenrick stated that the Conservative Party must always be a broad church but needed foundational principles. He set out 10 principles as "a first attempt to outline what our common creed should be." These included that "market economics drive growth" and that "we need a small state that works".

=== Donald Trump ===
In September 2024 Jenrick indicated that if he were an American citizen then he would support Donald Trump in the 2024 United States presidential election. In February he had already argued that "There are areas we can learn from Donald Trump and the Republican Party, one of which is illegal migration" during a trip to the Mexico-United States border. In February 2025 Jenrick condemned Trump's handling of his meeting with Volodymyr Zelenskyy, stating that Winston Churchill "would be turning in his grave if he saw that happen".

=== Education ===
Jenrick has publicly criticised the Labour government's policy of introducing VAT charges on tuition fees for private schools and said he would reverse the policy if he became prime minister. He is also a supporter of grammar schools, and said in September 2024 that he would support lifting the legal ban on the opening of new grammar schools.

=== European Convention on Human Rights ===
In September 2024, Jenrick called for the UK to withdraw from the European Convention on Human Rights (ECHR) and argued that doing so was necessary to remove asylum seekers more quickly.

In October 2024, while standing to be leader of the Conservative Party, Jenrick suggested that British special forces were "killing rather than capturing terrorists because our lawyers tell us that if they're caught, the European court will set them free". In response, Grant Shapps, a former Defence Secretary, stated he had found "no evidence" to support Jenrick's claim. Jenrick's comments were also criticised by two of the other leadership contenders, James Cleverly and Tom Tugendhat.

=== European Union ===
Jenrick opposed Brexit and voted Remain during the 2016 United Kingdom European Union membership referendum. However, following the result, he voted in favour of triggering Article 50 to begin the United Kingdom's withdrawal from the EU and said attempts to frustrate initiating the Brexit process were "arrogant and undemocratic".

=== International aid ===
In April 2024 Jenrick suggested that the UK government's overseas aid budget should be cut by 50 per cent with the savings used to increase spending on the British Armed Forces.

In September 2024 Jenrick announced that he would refuse aid to countries that do not accept individuals whose asylum claims have been denied.

=== Immigration ===
Jenrick is an opponent of mass immigration and has taken strong stances in favour of radically reducing both legal and illegal immigration and has been described as a "hardliner" on the issue. He has advocated for the Home Office to be broken up into smaller departments, including an immigration department dedicated to border control and the reduction in immigration numbers. He has argued for denying visas to Indian migrants until the Indian government accepts the returns of illegal entrants into the United Kingdom. He has advocated for leaving the European Convention on Human Rights (ECHR), the European Court of Justice (ECJ), establishing a legally-binding cap on the numbers of visas of 10,000 per annum, and re-implementing the Rwanda deportation scheme. He has also said that without a firm commitment to leaving the ECHR, the Conservative Party "will die".

Jenrick supports the withdrawal of visas to any country which does not take back refused asylum seekers. In September 2024 he said: "Illegal migration is placing intolerable pressure on our communities and the taxpayer." He has proposed that the nationality, visa and asylum status of people convicted of a criminal offence should be recorded to ensure the UK is not "importing crime", and contends that "Too many of our businesses have become hooked on the drug of imported foreign labour". In September 2024, he argued that English national identity was being undermined and damaged by mass immigration, multiculturalism, and "woke culture". He wrote in a column for the Daily Mail that "The combination of unprecedented migration, the dismantling of our national culture, non-integrating multiculturalism and the denigration of our identity has presented huge problems".

Defending the Conservative government's Illegal Migration Bill in Parliament, Jenrick said in April 2023 that refugees crossing the English Channel "cannibalise" communities by importing "different lifestyles and values", which he said undermines "cultural cohesiveness" and that the "nation has a right to preserve itself, "Whilst it's impossible to determine the exact numbers, the basic fact is undeniable that the number of people who are willing and able to reach the UK today is astronomical and vastly outnumbers what we are capable or willing to take as a country." Jenrick said in May 2023 that "The refugee convention ... says that people should seek sanctuary, should seek asylum in the first safe country." The United Nations High Commissioner for Refugees previously stated in 2021 that that there is a misunderstanding that asylum-seekers "should claim asylum in the first safe country they reach."

Jenrick supports designating Albania as a safe country for the purposes of asylum claims after there was an increase in Albanian nationals crossing the English channel, describing the country as demonstrably safe. He also described current levels of migration into the United Kingdom as unsustainable, with illegal migration likely to become an issue for many years to come. He has also said that "we must declare countries like Turkey, Brazil and Vietnam safe in law – these are holiday destinations, not war-torn hell-holes."

In the run up to a vote for an amendment to force a national inquiry into rape gangs in January 2025, Jenrick wrote on Twitter: "We have seen millions of people enter the UK in recent years and some of them have backward, frankly medieval attitudes to women [and that the rape gangs scandal] started with the onset of mass migration". The Liberal Democrats called for Kemi Badenoch to remove Jenrick from his frontbench role as Shadow Secretary of State for Justice and Shadow Lord Chancellor over what they described as "divisive comments". A spokesman for Badenoch said this was a "distraction from the core issue" of protecting children from sexual abuse by the Liberal Democrats. Deputy Leader of the Liberal Democrats Daisy Cooper said: "Robert Jenrick's attempt to exploit this appalling scandal for his own political gain is completely shameless. He didn't lift a finger to help the victims when a minister, now he's jumping on the bandwagon and acting like a pound shop [Nigel] Farage." A spokesman for the leader of the Conservative Party wrote: "Robert Jenrick did an excellent job this morning explaining the pressing need for a national inquiry into the rape gangs scandal." On 9 January 2025, Jenrick voted for the inquiry whilst all Liberal Democrats abstained.

His comments came after filming a GB News segment on litter. "There are numerous parts of our country now where the same story is happening, and at the extreme levels, a lack of integration leads us into a very dark place as a country."

=== Israel ===
Jenrick was a member of the Conservative Friends of Israel parliamentary group until he left to join Reform UK. In July 2019, he spoke of his visit to Auschwitz concentration camp, "It had a huge impact on me and in particular because my wife is the daughter [sic] of Holocaust survivors from modern day Poland and Ukraine." Jenrick has said his connection to the Jewish community forms "a very important and integral part of my life".

Jenrick has been a consistent defender of the State of Israel, including in its war against Hamas and Hezbollah. In October 2023 he denounced the BBC for failing to describe Hamas as a terrorist organisation. In December 2023, Jenrick called for Israel to "finish the job" in its war with Hamas in Gaza. During the 2024 United Kingdom riots, Jenrick said police should have "immediately arrested" protesters shouting Allahu Akbar (meaning "God is greater [than everything]"), arguing that the phrase was aggressive and intimidating due to its connection with Islamic terrorism. His comments prompted criticism from several Muslim MPs who argued that Jenrick linked all Muslims to extremism.

In late 2023, Jenrick intervened with the Home Office to request that Jordanian-Canadian student Dana Abu Qamar's visa be revoked after she said in an interview with Sky News that, in regards to the 7 October attack in Israel, "We are really, really full of joy of what happened." On 1 December, the UK government decided to revoke her visa stating that Abu Qamar's presence in the UK was "not conducive to the public good". The European Legal Support Center, which provides legal support for pro-Palestinian activists, criticised the decision in a statement: "For a government minister to personally and arbitrarily intervene to remove a Palestinian student from the country and suppress her speech while her family are being killed in Gaza is truly unconscionable". Jenrick suggested that visitors to the UK would be removed if they incited antisemitism, adding that there was a "legal process that must be followed properly".

In September 2024, during the Conservative Party leadership campaign, he promised to move Britain's embassy in Tel Aviv to Jerusalem and to recognise Jerusalem as the capital of Israel, saying that "If the Foreign Office or the civil servants don't want to do it, I will build it myself." He also argued that Israel "cannot be expected to live alongside terrorists, whether that's Hamas or Hezbollah", and that he wants the United Kingdom to be "the most welcoming country in the world for Israelis and for the Jewish community." In August 2024, he called on the British government to proscribe the Iranian Islamic Revolutionary Guard Corps as a terrorist organisation.

=== Reform UK (while a Conservative) ===
In a 2024 interview with Beth Rigby on SkyNews Jenrick indicated he would have "no problem" with Reform UK leader Nigel Farage joining the Conservative Party.

In April 2025, a recording of Jenrick speaking to a student political society the previous month came to light. In it, following remarks about Farage's Reform UK party, he stated that:

"I want the right to be united. And so, one way or another, I'm determined to do that and to bring this coalition together and make sure we unite as a nation as well."

This prompted media speculation that he was seeking to move toward a coalition or electoral alliance between Reform UK and the Conservative Party. The leaders of both parties had both previously stated that no such deal was on the table.

Later on 25 April 2025, he said on ITV's Good Morning Britain in response to being asked about the earlier comments: "Kemi has been very clear there won't be a pact with Reform, and I've said time and again that I want to put Reform out of business. I want to send Nigel Farage back to retirement."

== Personal life ==
Jenrick is married to Michal Berkner. She is nine years older than Jenrick, and is the grandchild of Holocaust survivors. She is an Israeli-born and US-educated corporate lawyer who practises mainly in London. Together, they have three daughters, whom they are bringing up in the Jewish faith. One of their children was born in 2013, the year that former prime minister Margaret Thatcher died, and has the middle name Thatcher in tribute to her.

In 2022, following Russia's invasion of Ukraine, Jenrick's family took in a Ukrainian refugee family. He was the first British MP to do so, but the family was housed in his taxpayer-funded Newark home.

Jenrick owns three homes: two in London, including a £2.5m townhouse less than a mile from the Houses of Parliament, and Eye Manor, a Grade I listed building in Herefordshire which he purchased for £1.1 million in 2009. His constituency of Newark is 150 miles (240 km) from his family home in Herefordshire. He rents a £2,000-per-month property in his Newark constituency, which is paid for by the MPs' second homes allowance.

In April 2023, Jenrick was disqualified from driving for six months and fined £1,639 after travelling at 68 miles per hour (109 km/h) in a 40 mph (64 km/h) speed limit zone on the M1 in August 2022. Jenrick said he accepted the court's decision and that he did not see a variable speed limit which had been applied on the motorway. It was reported that Jenrick had previously been fined £307 and given three penalty points in March for exceeding the speed limit on the A40 in west London in August 2021.

Parliament of the United Kingdom
Preceded by Patrick Mercer	Member of Parliament for Newark; 2014–present	Incumbent
Political offices
Preceded by Andrew Jones	Exchequer Secretary to the Treasury; 2018–2019	Succeeded by Simon Clarke
Preceded by James Brokenshire	Secretary of State for Housing, Communities and Local Government; 2019–2021	Succeeded by Michael Gove
Preceded by Maria Caulfield	Minister of State for Health; 2022	Succeeded by Helen Whately
Preceded by Tom Pursglove	Minister of State for Immigration; 2022–2023	Succeeded by Michael Tomlinson (Countering Illegal Migration); Tom Pursglove (Legal Migration and the Border)
Preceded by Ed Argar	Shadow Secretary of State for Justice; 2024–2026	Succeeded by Nick Timothy
Preceded by Ed Argar	Shadow Lord Chancellor; 2024–2026	Succeeded by Nick Timothy
