= Mel Stride =

British politician (born 1961)

The Right Honourable Sir Mel Stride MP
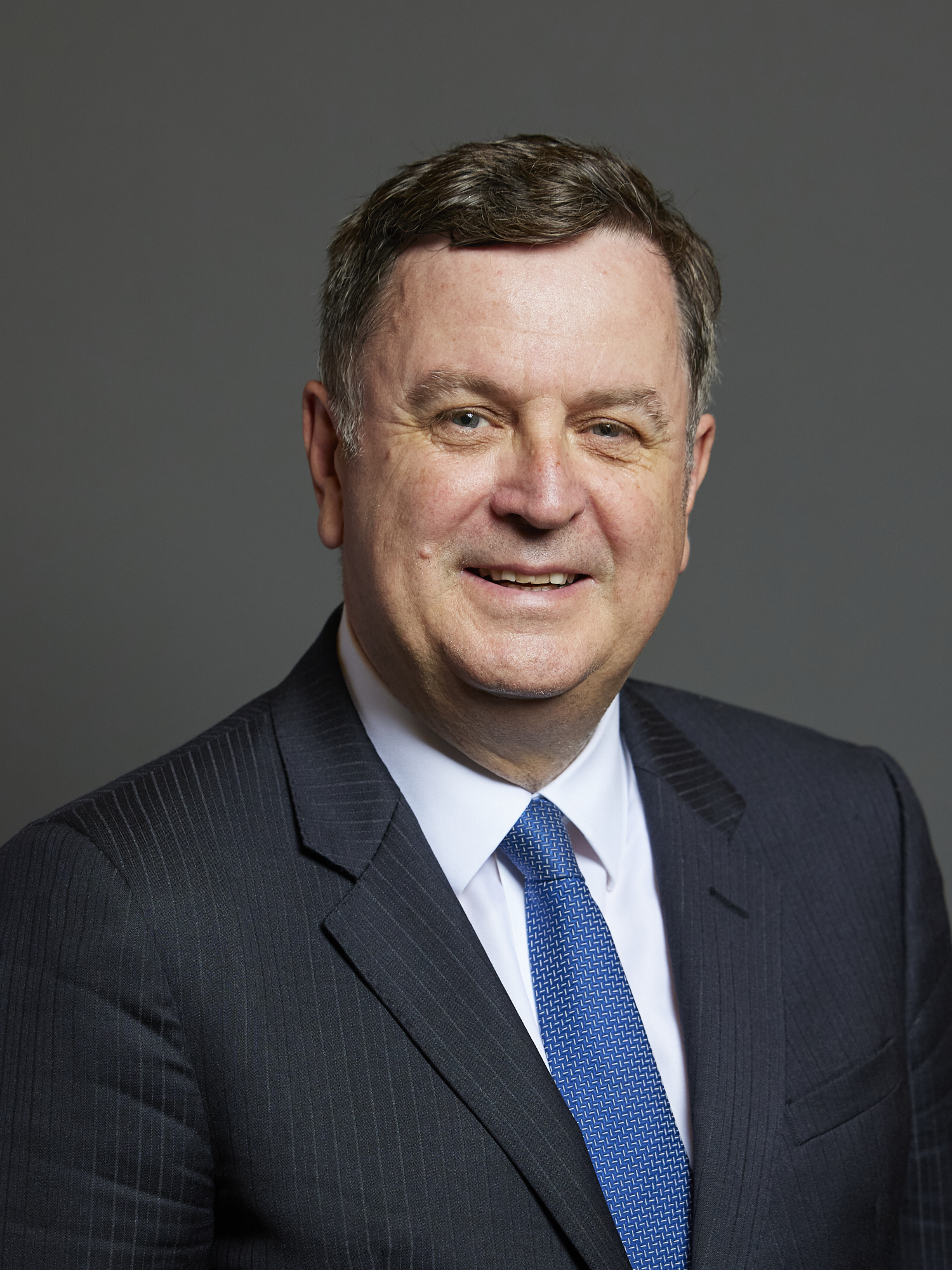
- Official portrait, 2024

Shadow Chancellor of the Exchequer
- In office 4 November 2024 – 31 August 2026
- Leader: Kemi Badenoch
- Preceded by: Jeremy Hunt
- Succeeded by: Andrew Griffith

Shadow Secretary of State for Work and Pensions
- In office 8 July 2024 – 4 November 2024
- Leader: Rishi Sunak
- Preceded by: Liz Kendall
- Succeeded by: Helen Whately
Ministerial offices 2015‍–‍2024
Secretary of State for Work and Pensions
In office 25 October 2022 – 5 July 2024
| Prime Minister | Rishi Sunak |
| Preceded by | Chloe Smith |
| Succeeded by | Liz Kendall |
Leader of the House of Commons Lord President of the Council
In office 23 May 2019 – 24 July 2019
| Prime Minister | Theresa May |
| Preceded by | Andrea Leadsom |
| Succeeded by | Jacob Rees-Mogg |
Financial Secretary to the Treasury Paymaster General
In office 13 June 2017 – 23 May 2019
| Prime Minister | Theresa May |
| Preceded by | Ben Gummer (Paymaster General); Jane Ellison (Financial Secretary) |
| Succeeded by | Jesse Norman |
Comptroller of the Household
In office 17 July 2016 – 12 June 2017
| Prime Minister | Theresa May |
| Preceded by | Gavin Barwell |
| Succeeded by | Chris Pincher |
Lord Commissioner of the Treasury
In office 13 May 2015 – 17 July 2016
| Prime Minister | David Cameron |
| Preceded by | Harriett Baldwin |
| Succeeded by | Andrew Griffiths |

Chair of the Treasury Select Committee
- In office 23 October 2019 – 25 October 2022
- Preceded by: Nicky Morgan
- Succeeded by: Harriett Baldwin

Member of Parliament for Central Devon
- Incumbent
- Assumed office 6 May 2010
- Preceded by: Constituency created
- Majority: 61 (0.1%)

Personal details
- Born: Melvyn John Stride; 30 September 1961 (age 65) Ealing, Middlesex, England
- Party: Conservative
- Spouse: Michelle King Hughes (m. 2005)
- Children: 3
- Education: St Edmund Hall, Oxford
- Occupation: Politician; businessman
- Website: Official website

Sir Melvyn John Stride (born 30 September 1961) is a British politician who served as Shadow Chancellor of the Exchequer from 2024 to 2026. A member of the Conservative Party, he has been the Member of Parliament (MP) for Central Devon since 2010.

He previously served in the May government as Financial Secretary to the Treasury and Paymaster General from 2017 to 2019 and as Leader of the House of Commons and Lord President of the Council from May to July 2019. From 2019 to 2022 he sat as a backbencher, serving as Chair of the Treasury Select Committee. From 2022 to 2024, during the government of Rishi Sunak, Stride served as Secretary of State for Work and Pensions. Following the Conservative Party's defeat in the 2024 general election, Stride was appointed Shadow Secretary of State for Work and Pensions. On Sunak's departure he launched his bid to become Leader of the Conservative Party, but was eliminated on the second ballot of MPs. Following Kemi Badenoch's victory in the 2024 leadership election she appointed Stride as Shadow Chancellor of the Exchequer.

== Early life and education ==
Melvyn John Stride was born in Ealing, in London, on 30 September 1961. He was educated at Portsmouth Grammar School, a private day school in the city of Portsmouth on England's South Coast, and then studied Philosophy, Politics and Economics at St Edmund Hall, at the University of Oxford, where he was elected president of the Oxford Union. Stride was made an Honorary Fellow of St Edmund Hall, at the University of Oxford in 2025.

== Life and career ==
In 1987, Stride set up a business specialising in trade exhibitions, conferences and publishing, which was expanded to the United States. The US company was sold.

=== Parliamentary career ===
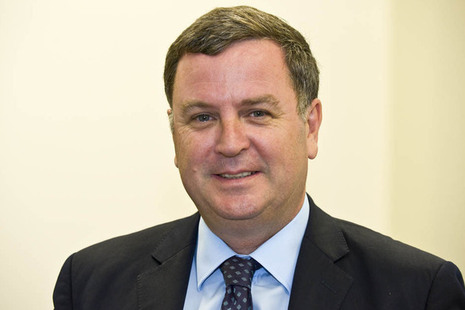
Stride in 2015

Stride was selected as the prospective Conservative candidate for Central Devon in June 2006 after his name was added to the new Conservative A-List in 2006; he was the first A-Lister to be selected.

At the 2010 general election, Stride was elected as MP for Central Devon with 51.5% of the vote and a majority of 9,230.

On 28 October 2011, Stride was appointed Parliamentary Private Secretary to the Minister of State for Further Education, Skills and Lifelong Learning, John Hayes.

At the 2015 general election, Stride was re-elected as MP for Central Devon with an increased vote share of 52.2% and an increased majority of 21,265. Stride was promoted to the frontbench as Lord Commissioner of the Treasury after the election. Stride was opposed to Brexit prior to the 2016 referendum.

Stride was appointed Comptroller of the Household following the appointment of Theresa May as Prime Minister.

At the snap 2017 general election, Stride was again re-elected, with an increased vote share of 54.1% and a decreased majority of 15,680. He was again re-elected at the 2019 general election, with an increased vote share of 55.3% and an increased majority of 17,721. At the 2024 general election, Stride was again re-elected, with a decreased vote share of 31.5% and a decreased majority of 61.

=== Ministerial career: 2017–2019 ===
Following the 2017 general election, Stride was appointed Financial Secretary to the Treasury. In this role in April 2019, Stride was accused by MPs of breaking the Ministerial Code over comments he had made in relation to the Loan Charge. Stride was appointed Leader of the House of Commons and Lord President of the Council on 23 May 2019, following the resignation of Andrea Leadsom. Stride endorsed Michael Gove to become Leader of the Conservative Party in the 2019 leadership election. Following Boris Johnson's election as party leader and appointment as Prime Minister he was dismissed from his role as Leader of the House of Commons and replaced by Jacob Rees-Mogg.

=== Backbencher: 2019–2022 ===
Avatar of Mel Stride

Mel Stride
(@MelJStride)
tweeted:

Disappointed that @RishiSunak did not prevail but will be uniting behind @trussliz to tackle the massive challenges we face. The cost of living crisis, inflation, war in Ukraine, NHS backlogs, illegal migration. There is much to do and now is the time for the party to unite.

Sep 5, 2022

On 23 October 2019, Stride was elected Chair of the Treasury Select Committee, replacing Nicky Morgan. Stride supported Rishi Sunak in the July–September 2022 Conservative Party leadership election, serving as his campaign chief, and lent his support to him again in the October 2022 Conservative Party leadership election.

=== Secretary of State for Work and Pensions: 2022–2024 ===
Upon the appointment of Rishi Sunak as Prime Minister, Stride returned to the frontbench having been appointed Secretary of State for Work and Pensions. In September 2023, Stride commented on the state pension system in the United Kingdom. Stride said that the triple lock system was not sustainable in the long term. The comments came in response to reports that the government was considering scrapping the mechanism used to uprate the state pension having seen several years of large increases.

Stride became well known for his frequent media appearances during the 2024 general election campaign, making more appearances on morning television programs than any other Conservative minister.

=== In opposition ===
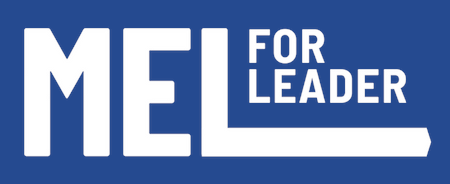
Logo for Stride's 2024 leadership campaign

The Conservative Party suffered a landslide defeat at the 2024 general election and Stride's constituency became one of the country's most marginal, with his majority falling to just 61 votes. Immediately afterwards, Stride called for the party to elect a new leader. Following the election and the subsequent formation of the Starmer ministry, Stride was appointed Shadow Secretary of State for Work and Pensions in Rishi Sunak's caretaker Shadow Cabinet.

On 26 July 2024, Stride announced he would be standing in the 2024 leadership election to be the new Conservative Party leader. During the first MPs' ballot, Stride achieved the second lowest number of votes of the six candidates, at 16. Stride's outperformance of Priti Patel was an upset, leading him to declare his campaign had "Melmentum". He came last of the remaining five candidates in the second ballot, remaining at 16 votes, and was eliminated from the contest on 10 September. Kemi Badenoch ultimately won the party leadership, prevailing over Robert Jenrick in the final round on 2 November 2025.

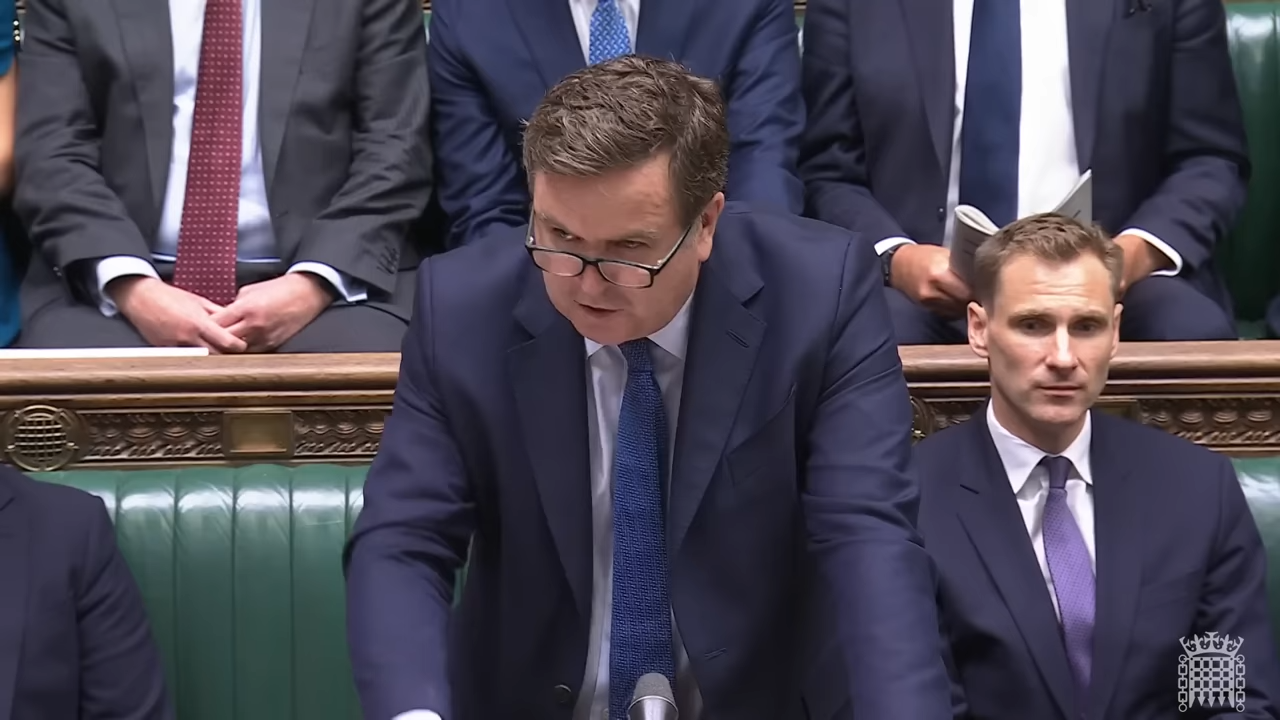
Stride during Prime Minister's Questions in 2025

On 4 November 2024, Stride was appointed Shadow Chancellor of the Exchequer in Badenoch's shadow cabinet.

In June 2025, Stride apologised for the September 2022 mini-budget implemented by Prime Minister Liz Truss, stating that the Conservatives would "never again" risk the UK's economic stability by making "promises we cannot afford".

During his time as Shadow Chancellor of the Exchequer, Stride deputised for the Leader of the Opposition during Deputy PMQs, facing Angela Rayner on 25 June 2025 whilst the Prime Minister was at the 2025 The Hague NATO summit.

At his autumn 2025 conference speech, Stride described Reform UK as a "populist alternative that is totally detached from reality" and blamed the incumbent Labour government for increasing borrowing, raising taxes, and increasing debt.

Shortly after Shadow Secretary of State for Justice Robert Jenrick was suspended by Badenoch for secretly plotting to defect to Reform in January 2026, Jenrick delivered a speech in which he criticised Stride. Jenrick accused Stride of overseeing "the explosion of the welfare bill and blocked the reforms needed” when he was Work and Pensions Secretary. Members of the shadow cabinet reportedly felt the attack on Stride was both too personal and hypocritical, given Jenrick's past praise of Stride.

Stride left the shadow cabinet in the reshuffle of 31 August 2026, describing his tenure as Shadow Chancellor as a "great honour" and saying he would continue to contribute to the Conservative team from the back benches. Kemi Badenoch paid tribute to his time in the role, saying he had brought "experience, seriousness and stability" and had "helped us steady the ship, rebuild economic credibility and become an effective opposition..." she added "the Conservative Party would not have got where we are without his work...".

== Personal life ==
In 2005, at Westminster, Stride married Michelle King Hughes (born 1975) and has three daughters. On 11 April 2025, Stride was knighted in Rishi Sunak's Resignation Honours List. The Times described Stride's political style as "full of enthusiasm" in 2025.

== Honours ==
- 2025: Knight Bachelor

Parliament of the United Kingdom
| New constituency | Member of Parliament for Central Devon; 2010–present | Incumbent |
Political offices
| Preceded by Gavin Barwell | Comptroller of the Household; 2016–2017 | Succeeded by Christopher Pincher |
| Preceded by Ben Gummer | Paymaster General; 2017–2019 | Succeeded by Jesse Norman |
| Preceded by Jane Ellison | Financial Secretary to the Treasury; 2017–2019 | Succeeded by Jesse Norman |
| Preceded by Andrea Leadsom | Leader of the House of Commons; 2019 | Succeeded by Jacob Rees-Mogg |
| Preceded by Andrea Leadsom | Lord President of the Council; 2019 | Succeeded by Jacob Rees-Mogg |
| Preceded by Chloe Smith | Secretary of State for Work and Pensions; 2022–2024 | Succeeded by Liz Kendall |
| Preceded by Liz Kendall | Shadow Secretary of State for Work and Pensions; 2024 | Succeeded by Helen Whately |
| Preceded by Jeremy Hunt | Shadow Chancellor of the Exchequer; 2024–2026 | Succeeded by Andrew Griffith |
