= Reform UK Conference 2026 =

Party conference

The Reform UK Conference 2026 took place in September 2026 at the National Exhibition Centre in Birmingham.

The conference was launched by the party leader Nigel Farage outlining his plans for the party's first 100 days in government if they were to be elected in the next United Kingdom general election. In his opening speech, he declared that his administrstion would immediately declare a national emergency, and make sweeping changes to government. Farage announced plans for Parliament to sit six days a week and to overhaul the House of Lords.

Farage's speech was overshadowed by the release of video of a sting operation broadcast on Channel 4 that appeared to show Farage and his aides discussing impermissible donations. Two of Farage's senior aides, Reform communications director Dan Jukes and Reform head of policy and Senior Advisor to Nigel Farage James Orr, later stood down from their roles following the release of the video.

Other speakers included Jordan Bardella, Malcolm Offord, and Zia Yusuf, who pledged to stop English Channel small boat crossings in 100 days, Suella Braverman, who pledged to cut degrees and student loan issuance, Robert Jenrick, who pledged to raise the income tax personal allowance, and Richard Tice, who delivered a speech entitled “Build, Britain, Build. Grow, Britain, Grow,” and pledged to reduce British household energy bills by £500 by 2030.

During the conference, a female protestor was beaten by audience members. The senior party member Robert Jenrick reacted by saying "boohoo" in reaction to a video of the attack. He later said that the attacker should be given a medal. Police later asked the victim to come forward to take part in a police investigation of the incident.

In his closing speech, referring to the events around the conference, Farage said: "I tell you what we learned yesterday and today. There will be times in this journey when there are good days, and times when there are difficult days. More often than not, things will be put upon us that are unfair. But sometimes we will make mistakes, sometimes we will get things wrong and get a bit of a kicking for it. But what this conference has shown is whatever you throw at the leadership, whatever you throw at the people’s army, we immediately pick ourselves up, dust ourselves down and start all over again."
