= Central Devon =

UK Parliament constituency (since 2010)

Coordinates: 50.7°N 3.9°W

- County constituency for the House of Commons
- Interactive map of boundaries from 2024
- Boundary of Central Devon in South West England
- County: Devon
- Population: 88,926 (2011 census)
- Electorate: 73,491 (2023)
- Major settlements: Okehampton, Crediton, Bovey Tracey and Chudleigh

Current constituency
- Created: 2010
- Member of Parliament: Mel Stride (Conservative)
- Seats: One
- Created from: North Devon, Teignbridge, Tiverton and Honiton, Torridge and West Devon, Totnes

Central Devon is a constituency (Note: A county constituency (for the purposes of election expenses and type of returning officer)) represented in the House of Commons of the UK Parliament since 2010 by Mel Stride of the Conservative Party. (Note: As with all constituencies, the constituency elects one Member of Parliament (MP) by the first past the post system of election at least every five years.)

== Constituency profile ==
Central Devon is a large rural constituency that covers part of Devon to the west of the city of Exeter. The constituency includes part of Dartmoor, an upland area and National Park. The largest settlement is the town of Okehampton, with a population of around 9,000. The constituency contains many other small market towns and villages, including Crediton, Bradninch, North Tawton, Hatherleigh, Exminster, Chagford, Moretonhampstead, Chudleigh, Ashburton and Buckfastleigh. The constituency is primarily agricultural and many of its towns grew from the wool trade in mediaeval times.

Residents of Central Devon are considerably older than the national average and have average levels of income, education and professional employment. The areas closer to Exeter are generally more affluent than the western, more inland parts of the constituency. White people make up 98% of the population. At the local county council, the constituency is divided between Liberal Democrat support in its east and Reform UK support in its west, with district councils generally having a mixture of Liberal Democrat and Conservative councillors. Voters were evenly split in the 2016 referendum on European Union membership, with an estimated result of 50% voting for each option.

== History ==
The constituency was created for the 2010 general election, following a review of parliamentary representation in Devon by the Boundary Commission for England, which increased seats in the county from 11 to 12. Central Devon covers parts of the East Devon, Mid Devon, Teignbridge and West Devon districts.

The wards from the last election presented a notional Conservative majority of just over 1,700, making it a marginal seat at the first election. Despite this, Mel Stride's majority over the Liberal Democrats was 17.1 percentage points with an absolute majority. Stride held the seat comfortably at the next three elections (2015, 2017 and 2019), but only just held on at the 2024 general election with a majority of 0.1% (61 votes) over the Labour Party candidate.

== Boundaries ==
=== 2010–2024 ===
The constituency contained electoral wards from four districts.

- From East Devon: Exe Valley;
- From Mid Devon: Boniface, Bradninch, Cadbury, Lawrence, Newbrooke, Sandford and Creedy, Silverton, Taw, Taw Vale, Upper Yeo, Way, Yeo;
- From Teignbridge: Ashburton and Buckfastleigh, Bovey Tracey, Chudleigh, Haytor, Kenn Valley, Moorland, Teignbridge North, Teign Valley;
- From West Devon: Chagford, Drewsteignton, Exbourne, Hatherleigh, Lew Valley, North Tawton, Okehampton East, Okehampton West, South Tawton.

=== 2024–present ===
Further to the 2023 Periodic Review of Westminster constituencies which came into effect for the 2024 general election, and a local government boundary review in Mid Devon District which came into effect in May 2023, the constituency is composed of the following:

- The District of Mid Devon wards of: Bradninch (nearly all); Cadbury; Crediton Boniface; Crediton Lawrence; Sandford & Creedy; Silverton; Taw Vale; Upper Yeo & Taw; Way; Yeo.
- The District of Teignbridge wards of: Ashburton & Buckfastleigh; Bovey; Chudleigh; Haytor; Kenn Valley; Moretonhampstead; Teign Valley.
- The Borough of West Devon wards of: Chagford; Drewsteignton; Exbourne; Hatherleigh; Okehampton North; Okehampton South; South Tawton.

The East Devon ward of Exe Valley was included in the new constituency of Exmouth and Exeter East. Otherwise, only a very minor change to the boundary in the District of Teignbridge.

== Members of Parliament ==
Election	Member	Party
2010	Mel Stride	Conservative

== Elections ==
Central Devon election results

=== Elections in the 2020s ===
General election 2024: Central Devon
Party	Candidate	Votes	%	±%
Conservative	Mel Stride	16,831	31.5	−23.8
Labour	Ollie Pearson	16,770	31.4	+6.6
Liberal Democrats	Mark Wooding	8,232	15.4	+0.4
Reform	Jeffrey Leeks	7,784	14.6	N/A
Green	Gill Westcott	3,338	6.2	+1.3
Independent	Arthur Price	477	0.9	N/A
Majority		61	0.1	−30.4
Turnout		53,432	70.9	−6.3
Registered electors		75,385		
Conservative hold		Swing	−15.2	

=== Elections in the 2010s ===
2019 notional result
Party	Vote	%
Conservative	31,366	55.3
Labour	14,066	24.8
Liberal Democrats	8,503	15.0
Green	2,789	4.9
Turnout	56,724	77.2
Electorate	73,491	

General election 2019: Central Devon
Party	Candidate	Votes	%	±%
Conservative	Mel Stride	32,095	55.3	+1.2
Labour	Lisa Webb	14,374	24.8	−2.2
Liberal Democrats	Alison Eden	8,770	15.1	+3.4
Green	Andy Williamson	2,833	4.9	+2.3
Majority		17,721	30.5	+3.4
Turnout		58,072	77.5	−1.1
Conservative hold		Swing	+1.7	

General election 2017: Central Devon
Party	Candidate	Votes	%	±%
Conservative	Mel Stride	31,278	54.1	+1.9
Labour	Lisa Webb	15,598	27.0	+14.2
Liberal Democrats	Alex White	6,770	11.7	−0.5
Green	Andy Williamson	1,531	2.6	−6.3
UKIP	Tim Matthews	1,326	2.3	−10.9
NHA	John Dean	871	1.5	N/A
Liberal	Lloyd Knight	470	0.8	N/A
Majority		15,680	27.1	−11.9
Turnout		57,844	78.6	+3.7
Conservative hold		Swing		

General election 2015: Central Devon
Party	Candidate	Votes	%	±%
Conservative	Mel Stride	28,436	52.2	+0.7
UKIP	John Conway	7,171	13.2	+7.9
Labour	Lynne Richards	6,985	12.8	+5.9
Liberal Democrats	Alex White	6,643	12.2	−22.2
Green	Andy Williamson	4,866	8.9	+7.0
Independent	Arthur Price	347	0.6	N/A
Majority		21,265	39.0	+11.9
Turnout		54,448	74.9	−0.8
Conservative hold		Swing		

General election 2010: Central Devon
Party	Candidate	Votes	%	±%
Conservative	Mel Stride	27,737	51.5	+7.7
Liberal Democrats	Phil Hutty	18,507	34.4	−4.4
Labour	Moira Macdonald	3,715	6.9	−4.7
UKIP	Bob Edwards	2,870	5.3	−0.5
Green	Colin Matthews	1,044	1.9	N/A
Majority		9,230	17.1	+12.1
Turnout		53,873	75.7	+5.8
Conservative hold		Swing	+6.1 (Note: Notional)	

== See also ==
- List of parliamentary constituencies in Devon
