= UnHerd =

British website featuring politics and culture

- Website type: Commentary
- Available in: English
- Founded: 21 July 2017; 9 years ago
- Headquarters: London, England, UK
- Owner: Paul Marshall
- Editors: Freddie Sayers (Editor-in-Chief & CEO)
- Website: unherd.com
- Current status: Active

UnHerd is a British news and opinion website founded in 2017 by conservative commentator Tim Montgomerie and hedge fund manager Paul Marshall. It is conservative and right-wing.

== History ==
UnHerd was founded in 2017 by the hedge fund manager Paul Marshall as its owner and publisher and conservative British political activist Tim Montgomerie as its editor.

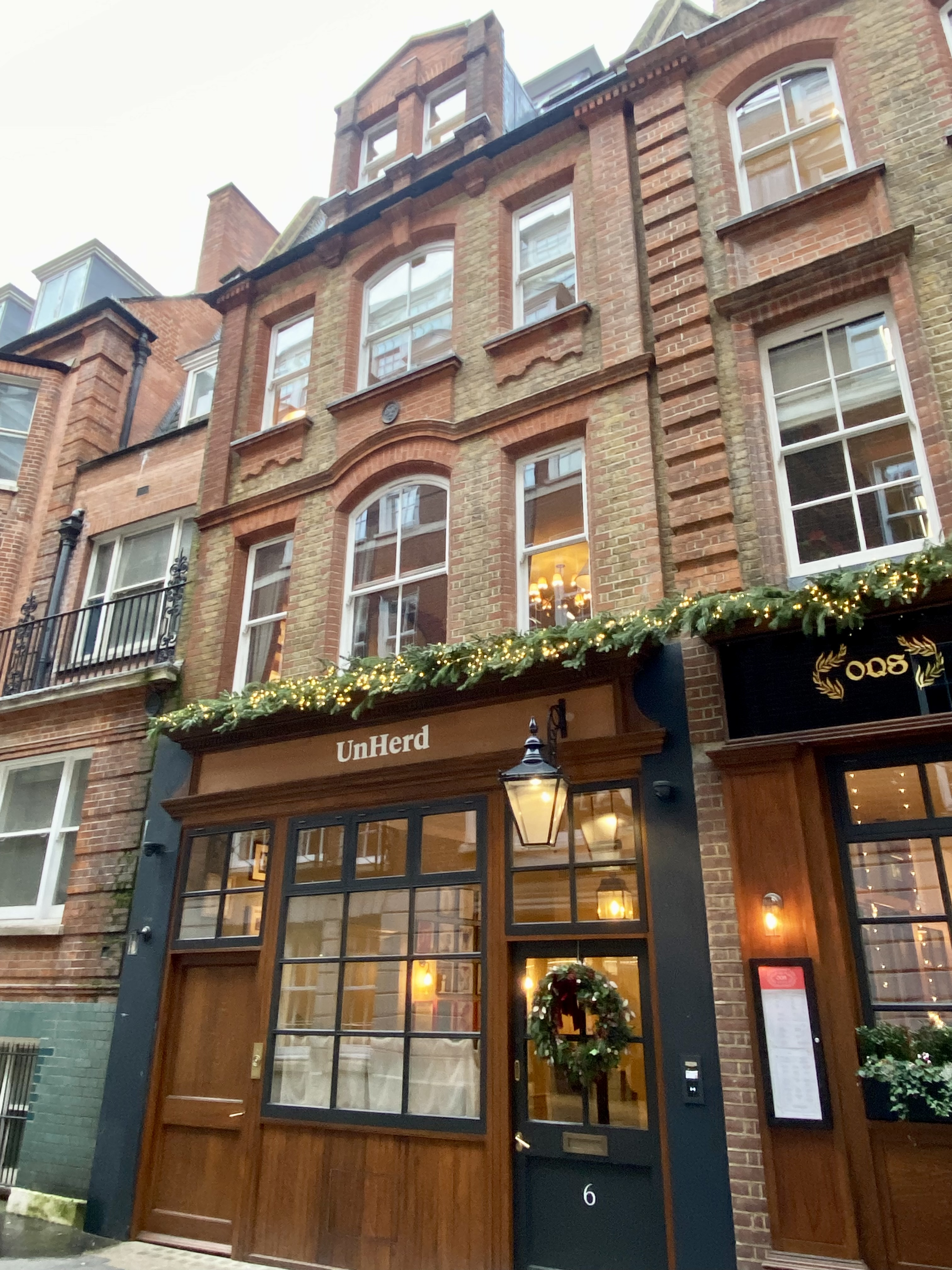
UnHerd at Old Queen Street, Westminster

The website initially existed without a paywall, as it is funded by an endowment from Marshall. In 2017, New Statesman reported that the site intended to introduce paid services. In May 2020, the site said that it intended to switch to a subscription model later that year. As of October 2022, it offers readers a limited number of articles free of charge.

Following Montgomerie's departure in September 2018, journalist Sally Chatterton, who previously wrote for The Daily Telegraph and The Independent, took over as editor.

Freddie Sayers joined the magazine in 2019 as executive editor, having previously been editor-in-chief of YouGov and co-founder of the British news and current affairs website Politics Home. In November 2024, Sayers announced Sohrab Ahmari as the new U.S. editor.

In November 2022, UnHerd opened a private members' club and restaurant in Westminster, named the Old Queen Street Cafe. Talks and debates at the club are broadcast on UnHerd's YouTube channel.

In January 2023, former Politico and The Atlantic writer Tom McTague was hired as UnHerd's political editor. McTague moved in 2025 to the New Statesman.

== Content ==
UnHerd's columnists include Giles Fraser, Aris Roussinos, Kat Rosenfield, Ayaan Hirsi Ali, David Patrikarakos, Terry Eagleton, Bret Easton Ellis, Mary Gaitskill, Lionel Shriver, Matthew Crawford, Helen Thompson, Freddie deBoer, Tanya Gold, Julie Bindel and Kathleen Stock. UnHerd describes its contributors as being both left-wing and right-wing writers. According to Samuel Earle writing for the Guardian, "beneath UnHerd's claims to nonpartisanship lie Conservative-friendly foundations and a range of rightwing interests, for which the site's 'heterodox' range of writers appear to offer convenient cover."

In 2018, the Press Gazette described the website as organised by seven themes: capitalism, flyover country, technology, news and media, religion, global affairs and groupthink.

In a February 2022 UnHerd piece, Guardian journalist Hadley Freeman wrote that her paper was allowing itself to be bullied over transgender issues.

In July 2022, UnHerd reported that the Ukrainian government's Center for Countering Disinformation had compiled a list of politicians and intellectuals in multiple countries who they believed were promoting Russian propaganda. The list included US senator Rand Paul, former US congresswoman Tulsi Gabbard, military analyst Edward Luttwak, political scientist John Mearsheimer, and journalist Glenn Greenwald, as well as the former chair of the Indian National Security Advisory Board. The UnHerd report included responses from Luttwak, Mearsheimer, and Greenwald.

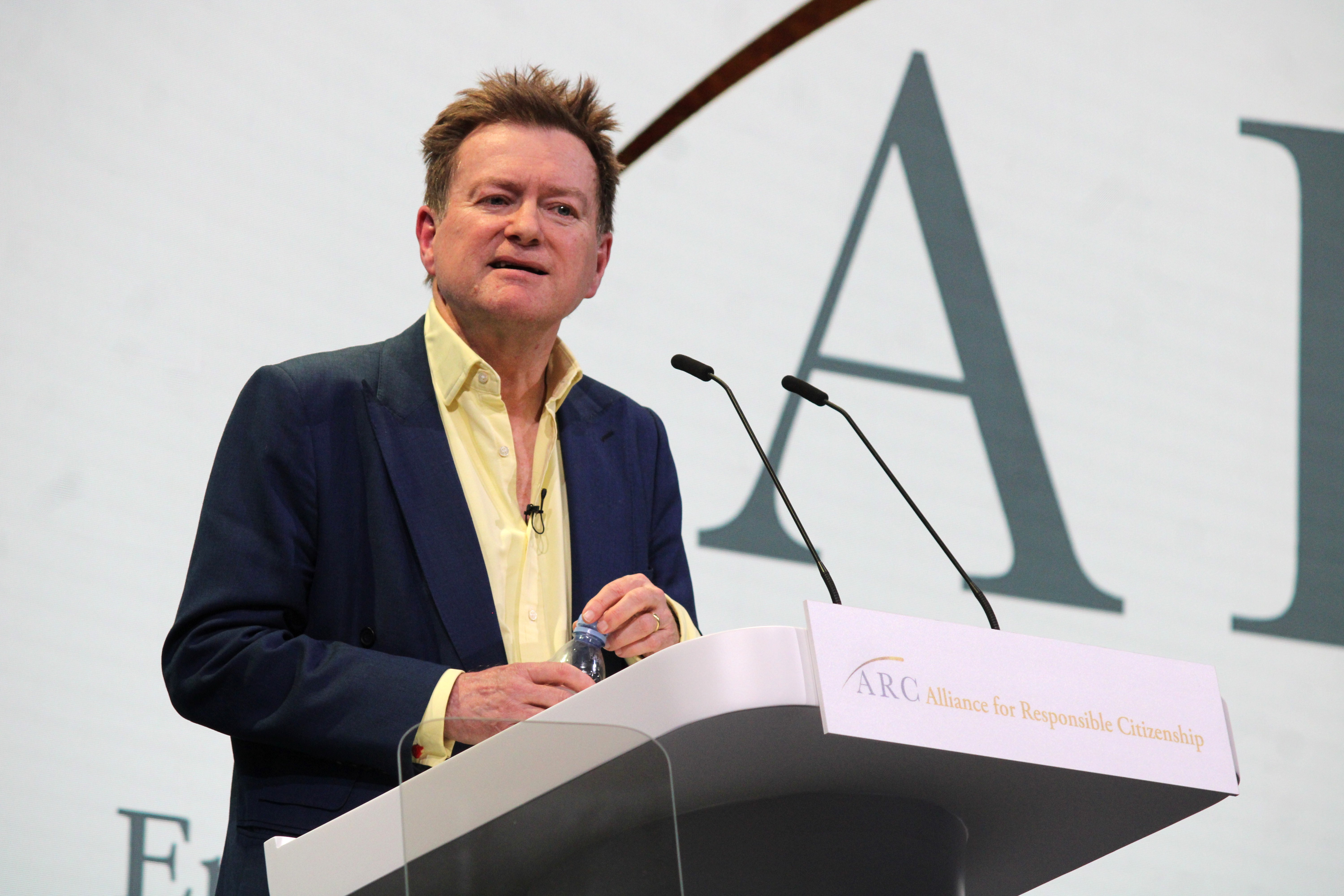
Paul Marshall in 2025

Samuel Earle, writing in The Guardian, described UnHerd in 2023 as "drifting away from explicit concern for the Conservative Party and the future of capitalism, and towards a focus on culture war topics: lockdowns, wokeness, cancel culture and the trans rights movement, as well as more general journalistic fare." Earle also argued that "On issues such as the climate crisis, UnHerd invariably calls for calm and scepticism. But when it comes to trans issues, the alarm seemingly cannot be raised too often or too loudly. An article in Morning Star claims that "the website is keen to knock the left and promote a variety of right-wing bugbears". The Conversation described the site's editorial line as "generally right-of-centre", but "not consistently pro-Conservative [Party]".

== Reception ==
When the site was launched in July 2017, Simon Childs in Vice was critical of the underlying premise, saying: "The social media news cycle can be a jading stream of ill-informed narcissists, but it's refreshing to be reminded that at least it offers a more diverse outlook than Tim Montgomerie funded by an oligarch publishing the kind of people who are generally 'unheard' because people edge away from them at parties." Jasper Jackson writing for the New Statesman was also sceptical of UnHerd's promotion of slow journalism, saying "the idea UnHerd is offering a groundbreaking solution to information overload is faintly ludicrous."

In 2020, Ian Burrell, writing in the i, noted that UnHerd pieces can be 2,000 words in length, presenting "nuance and context" in science articles and pursuing an "approach to digital journalism [that] is counter to the notion that only extreme views can generate traffic"; he compared the website to Tortoise Media, another "slower-paced news experiment that defies the catch-all notion of the media."

In 2021, an UnHerd piece criticising the World Health Organization (WHO) for dismissing the COVID-19 lab leak theory in its investigation was marked by Facebook with a "false information" tag; Facebook apologised after UnHerd objected. In an opinion piece about the incident, Financial Times columnist Jemima Kelly noted that three days later the White House expressed "deep concerns" about the WHO investigation.

In April 2024, the UK-based Global Disinformation Index placed UnHerd on its Dynamic Exclusion List, which is used by advertisers to identify undesirable websites for brands to appear on. This happened after UnHerd published three articles considered "anti-trans narratives". Sayers said UnHerd consequently could only achieve about 5% of expected advertising earnings.
