= Wes Streeting =

British politician (born 1983)

The Right Honourable Wes Streeting MP
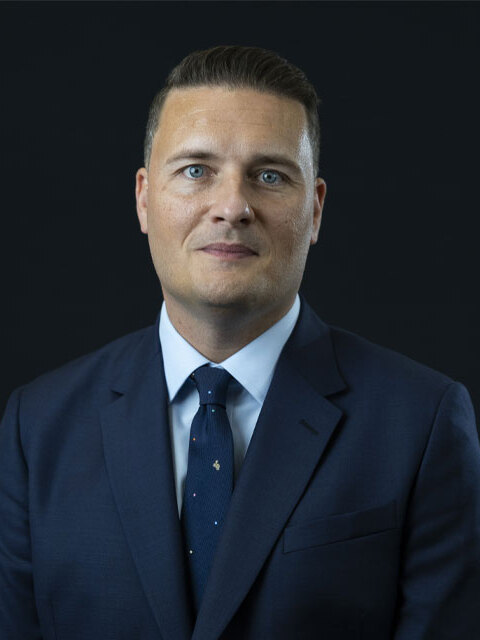
- Official portrait, 2026

Secretary of State for Defence
- Incumbent
- Assumed office 20 July 2026
- Prime Minister: Andy Burnham
- Preceded by: Dan Jarvis

Secretary of State for Health and Social Care
- In office 5 July 2024 – 14 May 2026
- Prime Minister: Keir Starmer
- Preceded by: Victoria Atkins
- Succeeded by: James Murray
Shadow portfolios
Shadow Secretary of State for Health and Social Care
In office 29 November 2021 – 5 July 2024
Leader	Keir Starmer
Preceded by	Jonathan Ashworth
Succeeded by	Victoria Atkins
Shadow Secretary of State for Child Poverty
In office 9 May 2021 – 29 November 2021
Leader	Keir Starmer
Preceded by	Office established
Succeeded by	Office abolished
Shadow Minister for Schools
In office 16 October 2020 – 9 May 2021
Leader	Keir Starmer
Preceded by	Margaret Greenwood
Succeeded by	Peter Kyle
Shadow Exchequer Secretary to the Treasury
In office 9 April 2020 – 16 October 2020
Leader	Keir Starmer
Preceded by	Lyn Brown
Succeeded by	Abena Oppong-Asare

Member of Parliament for Ilford North
- Incumbent
- Assumed office 7 May 2015
- Preceded by: Lee Scott
- Majority: 528 (0.2%)

Member of Redbridge London Borough Council for Aldborough Chadwell (2010–2014)
- In office 8 July 2010 – 3 May 2018

53rd President of the National Union of Students
- In office 1 July 2008 – 10 June 2010
- Preceded by: Gemma Tumelty
- Succeeded by: Aaron Porter

Personal details
- Born: Wesley Paul William Streeting; 21 January 1983 (age 43) Stepney, London, England
- Party: Labour
- Domestic partner: Joe Dancey (2013–present)
- Education: Selwyn College, Cambridge (BA)
- Website: www.wesstreeting.org
- Wes Streeting's voice Streeting speaks at a debate on whether the school curriculum should be used to impart values. Recorded 17 November 2012

Wesley Paul William Streeting (/ˈstriːtɪŋ/; born 21 January 1983) is a British politician who has served as Secretary of State for Defence since 2026. He previously served as Secretary of State for Health and Social Care from 2024 until his resignation in 2026. A member of the Labour Party, he has been Member of Parliament (MP) for Ilford North since 2015.

Streeting read history at the University of Cambridge and was president of the Cambridge Students' Union from 2004 to 2005. He was president of the National Union of Students (NUS) from 2008 to 2010. Streeting also worked for Progress, a Labour Party–related organisation, for a year before working in the public sector. In 2010 he was elected to Redbridge London Borough Council for Labour and became deputy leader of the council in May 2014. Streeting was elected to the House of Commons as MP for Ilford North at the 2015 general election and resigned as the council's deputy leader before standing down as a councillor in 2018. He was returned to Parliament at both the 2017 and the 2019 general elections.

Following Keir Starmer's election as Leader of the Labour Party in the 2020 leadership election, Streeting joined the front bench as Shadow Exchequer Secretary to the Treasury in April 2020. He became Shadow Minister for Schools in October 2020 after the resignation of Margaret Greenwood before joining the shadow cabinet as Shadow Secretary of State for Child Poverty in the May 2021 shadow cabinet reshuffle. In the November 2021 shadow cabinet reshuffle, Streeting became, following a promotion by Starmer, Shadow Secretary of State for Health and Social Care, a position he remained in until July 2024.

Following Labour's victory at the 2024 general election, Streeting was appointed Secretary of State for Health and Social Care in the Starmer ministry. He resigned from this position in May 2026 following Labour's results in the 2026 United Kingdom local elections, Scottish Parliament election, and Senedd election, citing a lack of confidence in Starmer's leadership. He initially declared that he would run in any subsequent leadership election to succeed Starmer, but after the election of Andy Burnham to Parliament in June, Streeting declined to stand and endorsed Burnham. After Burnham became Prime Minister in July 2026, Streeting returned to government as Defence Secretary.

== Early life and education ==
Wesley Paul William Streeting was born on 21 January 1983 in Stepney, London, England, to Mark Streeting and Corrine Crowley, aged 17 and 16 respectively. He has five brothers, a sister and a stepsister.

His two grandfathers, both named Bill, were key figures in his youth. His maternal grandfather, Bill Crowley, was a frequently imprisoned criminal who had served time with the Kray twins. He often engaged his grandson in lively discussions about religion and politics. Streeting's maternal grandmother became embroiled in Crowley's crimes and was incarcerated at HM Prison Holloway, where she shared a cell with Christine Keeler (a key figure in the Profumo affair). According to Streeting, they "stayed in touch, they became friends". His grandmother was released from prison to give birth to his mother at Whittington Hospital in London. Streeting's paternal grandfather served in the Second World War in the Royal Navy and later in the merchant navy before becoming a civil engineer. Streeting recalled: "He was the grandad I was closest to. He was a traditional working-class Tory."

He grew up in a council flat. He recalls Conservative Party politicians, particularly Ann Widdecombe, in the 1990s "denigrating single-parent families like mine, which I took quite personally". He was educated at Westminster City School, a comprehensive state school in Victoria, London. He went on to study history at the University of Cambridge as an undergraduate student of Selwyn College, Cambridge, where he was JCR President, graduating in 2004. Streeting briefly left the Labour Party because he opposed its decision to enter the Iraq War.

Streeting came out as gay in his second year of university. He was elected President of Cambridge Students' Union for the 2004–05 academic year, a sabbatical officer role. As president he campaigned against the proposed closure of Cambridge University's architecture department. After graduating, Streeting worked part time for the Labour Party-related think tank Progress for a year.

== Career ==
=== Early career (2008–2010) ===
As president of the NUS, Streeting was a strong proponent of his predecessor Gemma Tumelty's proposed reforms to the NUS governance structures, which had been denounced and narrowly defeated by many left-wing groups in NUS as an attack on NUS democracy. His election was reported by The Guardian as "a move that will lend weight to the fight to modernise the union". During his term as NUS president he opposed academic strikes, "Given the effects of the current economic climate on the graduate jobs market, students need industrial action by university staff like a hole in the head".

Shortly after his election as NUS President, Streeting was appointed as a member of the government's Youth Citizenship Commission, chaired by Professor Jonathan Tonge of the University of Liverpool, which published its report in June 2009. Streeting supported university tuition fees as president, consistent with UK government policy during the New Labour years.

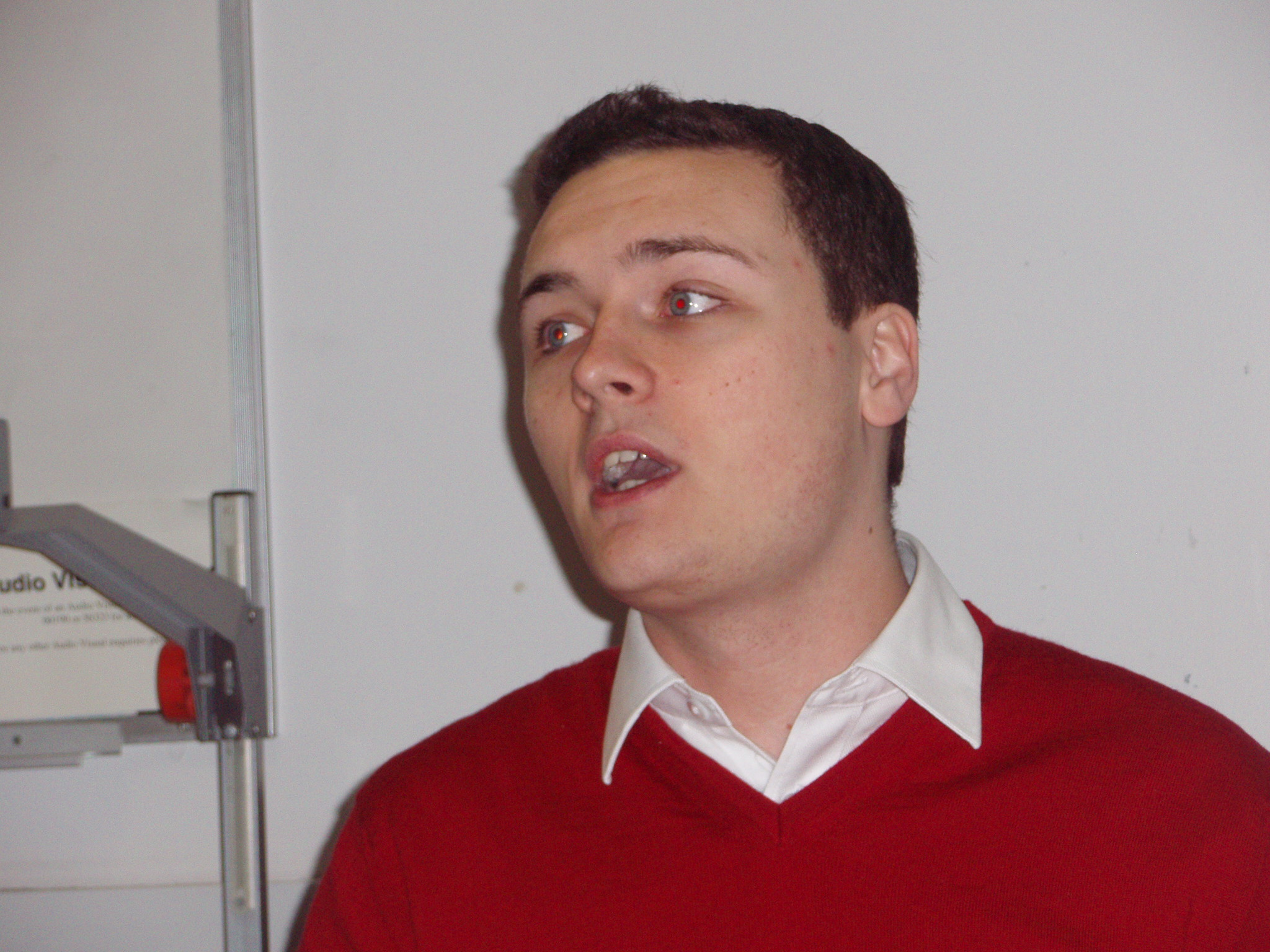
Wes Streeting in 2009

In 2009, while President of the NUS, Streeting posted tweets about wanting to push the Daily Mail journalist Jan Moir under a train.

After completing his term as President of the NUS, Streeting was subsequently a public sector consultant with PricewaterhouseCoopers (PwC), which he gave up on election as a councillor, because Redbridge Council was a "current audit client" of the firm; this forced him to choose between keeping his job or forcing a second by-election. In 2010, shortly after leaving PwC, Streeting was appointed as Head of Policy and Strategic Communications for Oona King's unsuccessful bid to win the Labour Party's nomination to be its candidate in the 2012 London Mayoral election.

He then was Chief Executive of the Helena Kennedy Foundation, an educational charity that promotes access to higher education for students from further education colleges. He went on to be head of education at Stonewall, a lesbian, gay, bisexual and transgender (LGBT) rights charity (for one year and six months), where he led their Education for All campaign to tackle homophobia in schools.

=== Council career (2010–2018) ===
In a July 2010 by-election, Streeting was elected for the Chadwell ward on Redbridge London Borough Council, having stood unsuccessfully for that council's Roding ward two months earlier. He held the Chadwell seat for Labour by 220 votes, winning with 31.5% of the vote on a 25.5% turnout. The by-election had been triggered by a previously elected candidate subsequently being found to be ineligible to serve on the council. Streeting was elected as Deputy Leader of the Labour Group in October 2011.

Streeting sought re-election in 2014 to represent the Aldborough ward. At a public meeting of the Redbridge Citizens' Assembly on 6 May 2014, Streeting promised on behalf of his group that, if they won the election, they would not reduce the level of Council Tax support provided to low-income working-age residents. In May 2014, Labour took control of Redbridge Council for the first time and Streeting was appointed Deputy Leader of the council, with Jas Athwal as Leader. Once elected, the Labour council proceeded to cut the level of council tax support, so as to treble the amount of Council Tax paid by supported residents from April 2016; the council made a further reduction from April 2017, and made a third reduction from April 2018.

Streeting resigned as Deputy Leader in May 2015, shortly after being elected Member of Parliament for Ilford North. Whilst he remained a backbench councillor following his election to Parliament, he chose not to claim his councillor allowance. Streeting did not stand for re-election after being elected to Parliament, and ceased to be a councillor on 3 May 2018.

== Parliamentary career ==
=== Backbenches (2015–2020) ===
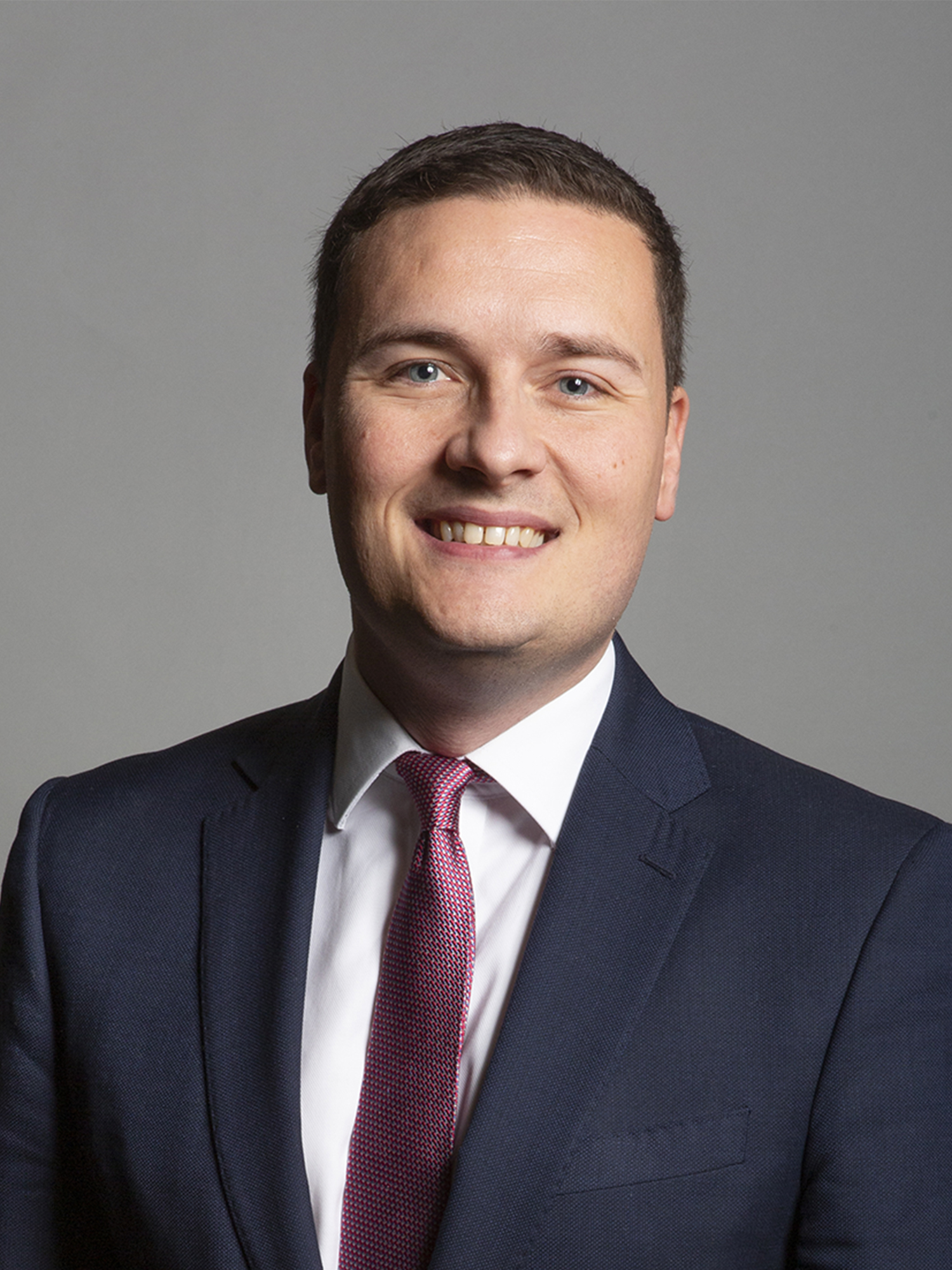
Official portrait, 2019

At the 2015 general election, Streeting was elected to Parliament as MP for Ilford North with 43.9% of the vote and a majority of 589. After being elected to Parliament, Streeting was elected Honorary President of the British Youth Council. In April 2016 Streeting criticised the Labour Party for refusing a £30,000 donation from McDonald's. According to Labour, the refusal was due to the company's poor record on worker's rights and hostile stance towards trade unions. Streeting campaigned in favour of the United Kingdom remaining in the European Union in the run-up to the 2016 EU membership referendum. He later campaigned for a People's Vote, a campaign group calling for a public vote on the final Brexit deal between the UK and the European Union.

At the snap 2017 general election, Streeting was re-elected as MP for Ilford North with an increased vote share of 57.8% and an increased majority of 9,639. Streeting is a vice-chair of the All-Party Parliamentary Group Against Antisemitism, a co-chair of the All Party Parliamentary Group on British Jews and a supporter of Labour Friends of Israel. He is also a co-chair of the All-Party Parliamentary Group on British Muslims and a supporter of Labour Friends of Palestine and the Middle East. In September 2018, he held the last in a series of London-wide consultations to create the Working Definition of Islamophobia. In July 2018, Streeting called for "targeted economic sanctions" against Israeli settlements in the West Bank in response to the Israeli government "grossly infringing on the human rights of Palestinians". In July 2019, Streeting was reported in the media as using abusive language towards a non-Jewish antisemitism campaigner.

Shortly before the 2019 general election, Streeting told a Labour First meeting that the party faced electoral oblivion in any snap poll due to the leadership's poor handling of Brexit and allegations of antisemitism. At the election, Streeting was again re-elected, with a decreased vote share of 50.5% and a decreased majority of 5,198. Following Labour's defeat in the general election, Streeting nominated Jess Phillips and Rosena Allin-Khan in the 2020 Labour Party leadership and deputy leadership elections, and, after Allin-Khan did not win, subsequently endorsed Ian Murray for the deputy leadership.

=== Frontbench (2020–2024) ===
Following the election of Keir Starmer as Leader of the Labour Party, Streeting was appointed Shadow Exchequer Secretary to the Treasury. On 16 October 2020, Streeting became Shadow Minister for Schools in succession to Margaret Greenwood, who had resigned the previous day following her opposition to the Covert Human Intelligence Sources (Criminal Conduct) Bill. In the May 2021 shadow cabinet reshuffle, Streeting was appointed to the Shadow Cabinet as Shadow Secretary of State for Child Poverty. He was promoted to the post of Shadow Secretary of State for Health and Social Care in the November 2021 shadow cabinet reshuffle.

In February 2022, Streeting was re-selected as the Labour candidate for Ilford North at the 2024 general election. Streeting was ranked sixth in the New Statesman's Left Power List of May 2023, described as "one of the most prominent and confident members" of the shadow cabinet. In July 2023, Streeting apologised in response to the treatment of Rosie Duffield by Labour for her views opposing gender self-identification and gender recognition reforms. In January 2024, he supported single-sex wards in hospitals, with the possibility of separate wards for transgender people in the future. Streeting welcomed the final report of the Cass Review, which dealt with gender services for children and young people, in April 2024. He said that the report "must provide a watershed moment for the NHS's gender identity services" and "provide[d] an evidence-led framework to deliver that". In an interview with The Sun, Streeting stated that he no longer considers his stance on trans rights to be "some people are trans, get over it, let's move on". Instead, he said there were "complexities".

At the 2024 general election, Streeting retained his Ilford North constituency by a margin of only 528 votes following a challenge by independent British-Palestinian candidate Leanne Mohamad, who ran in protest against Labour's stance on the Gaza war and the Gaza humanitarian crisis. While she was not elected, Streeting's unexpectedly narrow margin of victory provoked media and political attention, especially in the context of the simultaneous victory of several independent candidates against Labour running on platforms critical of the party's response to the conflict.

=== Health Secretary (2024–2026) ===
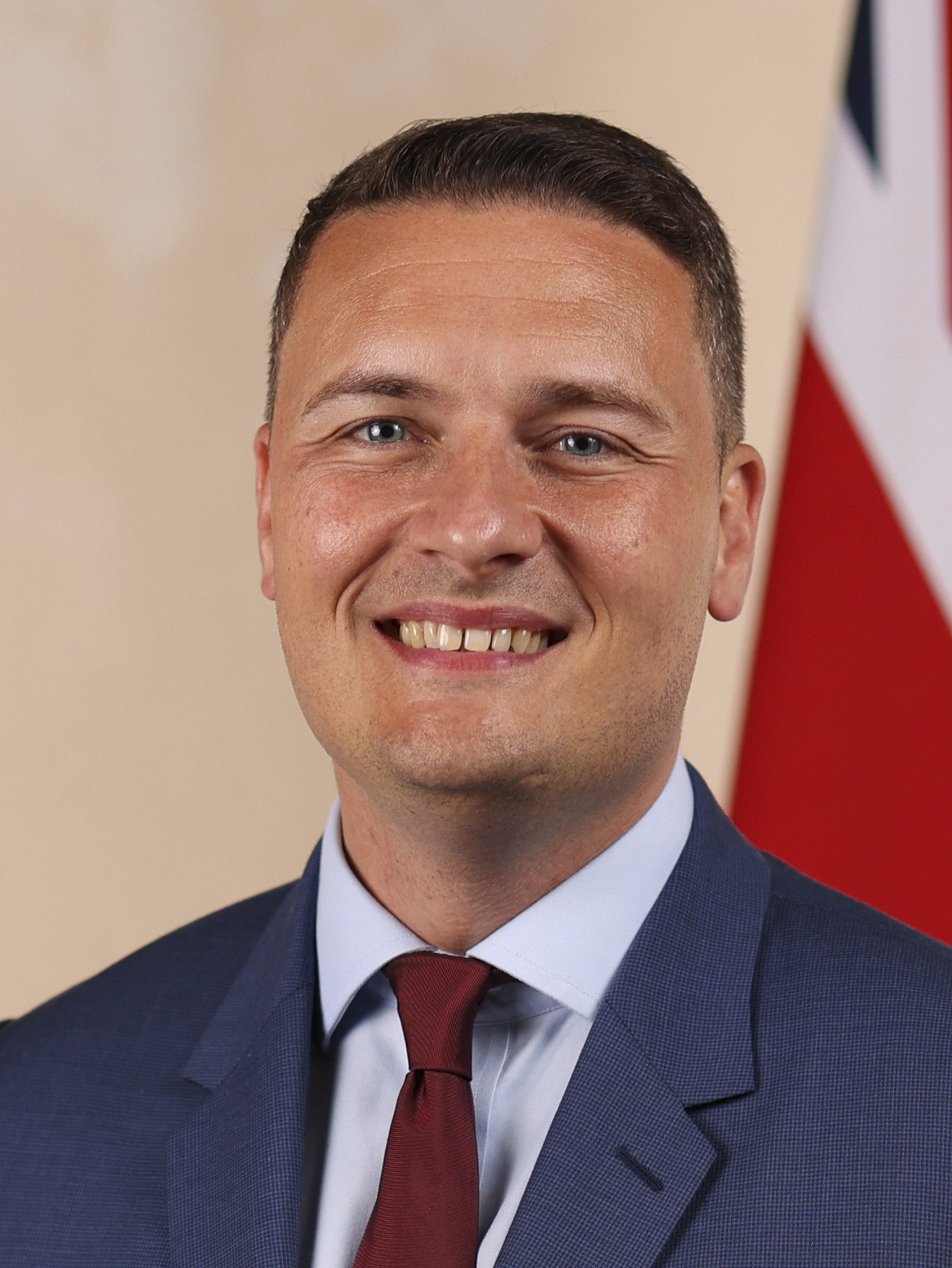
Official portrait, 2024

In July 2024, Streeting was appointed Secretary of State for Health and Social Care. He became a member of the Privy Council on 10 July 2024. Declaring the NHS to be broken, Streeting vowed to resolve the junior doctor strikes and decrease waiting times. New negotiations were held with the Labour government, which ended the dispute with Junior doctors on 17 September.

Research by the Good Law Project in October 2024 showed that more than 60% of the donations he has declared in the UK Parliament Register of Members' Financial Interests since he entered parliament has come from companies and individuals with links to private healthcare. As of October 2024, a total of £311,400 has been given by companies and individuals to Streeting. Streeting declared a January 2025 donation of £53,000 from OPD Group Ltd as being "Towards staffing costs in my constituency office".

In November 2024, Streeting commissioned the Leng Review, an independent review which examined the use of physician associates and anaesthesia associates in the National Health Service. Published in July 2025, it recommended renaming the roles and introducing stricter supervision to improve patient safety. Streeting pleged to implement the review's findings in full.

In November 2024, Streeting cautioned NHS leaders that consistently failing hospitals will be publicly identified, with managers held accountable, potentially facing removal and restrictions on future employment in the sector.

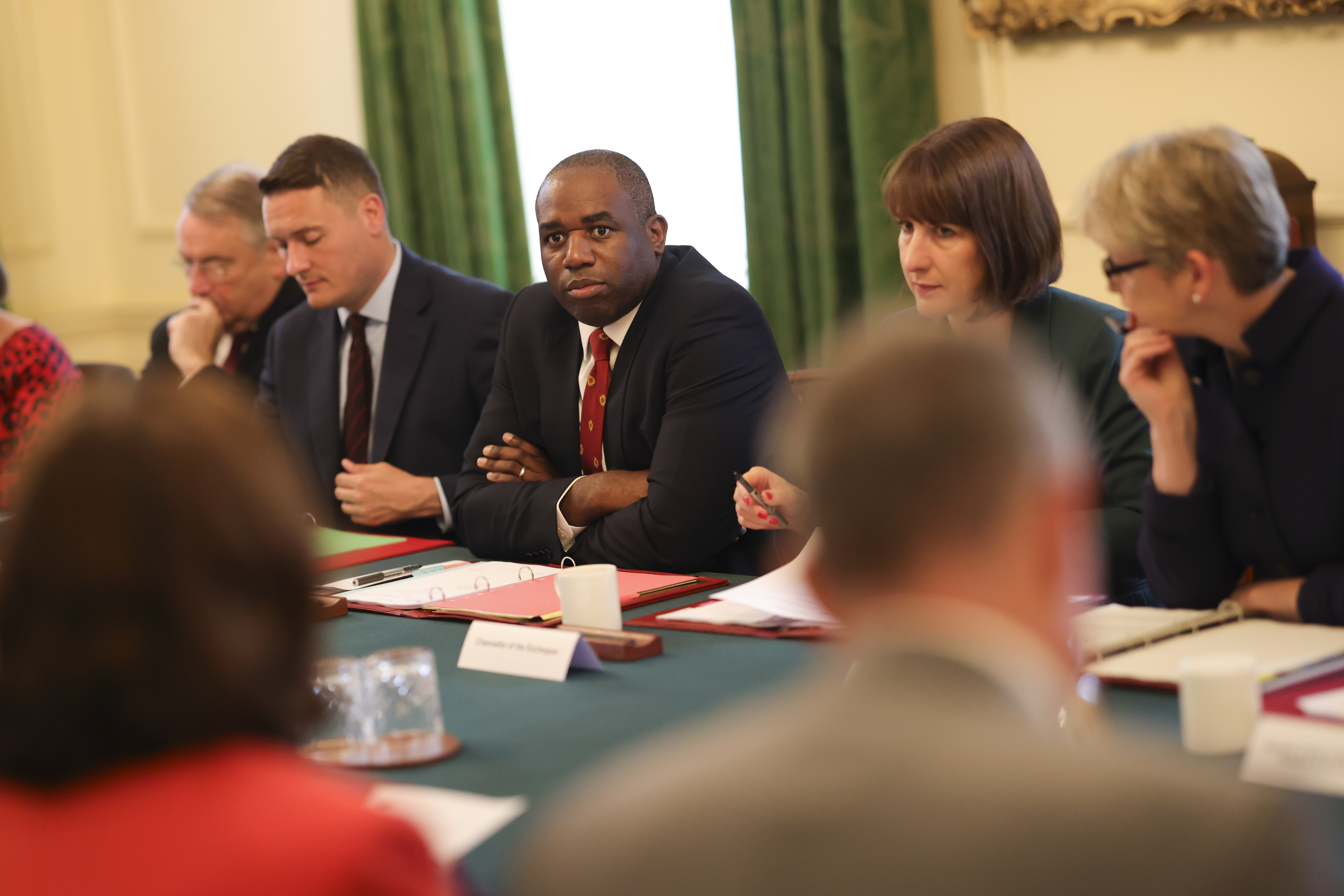
Streeting (left) at a cabinet meeting with David Lammy and Rachel Reeves, 9 July 2024

In December 2024, Streeting indefinitely extended a temporary ban on puberty blockers for children with gender dysphoria set in place by the prior Conservative government, following the publication of the Cass Review. He received mixed responses to his decision, with wide criticism from LGBTQ+ right groups, including Keyne Walker from TransActual characterising the ban as "discrimination, plain and simple". Puberty blockers remained legal for other children and adults.

In January 2025 a press release announced a new agreement between the NHS and the "independent sector to help tackle waiting lists and give patients greater choice". Also that month, Streeting criticised the campaigners of former neonatal nurse Lucy Letby, asking people to "consider those grieving parents who've lost their babies" and stating that "waging a campaign" on behalf of Letby is "not the right thing to do", concluding that "Until I'm told otherwise by the courts of this land, then I continue to stand by the view that there's been a fair conviction here until the courts determine otherwise; that's how justice in this country works."

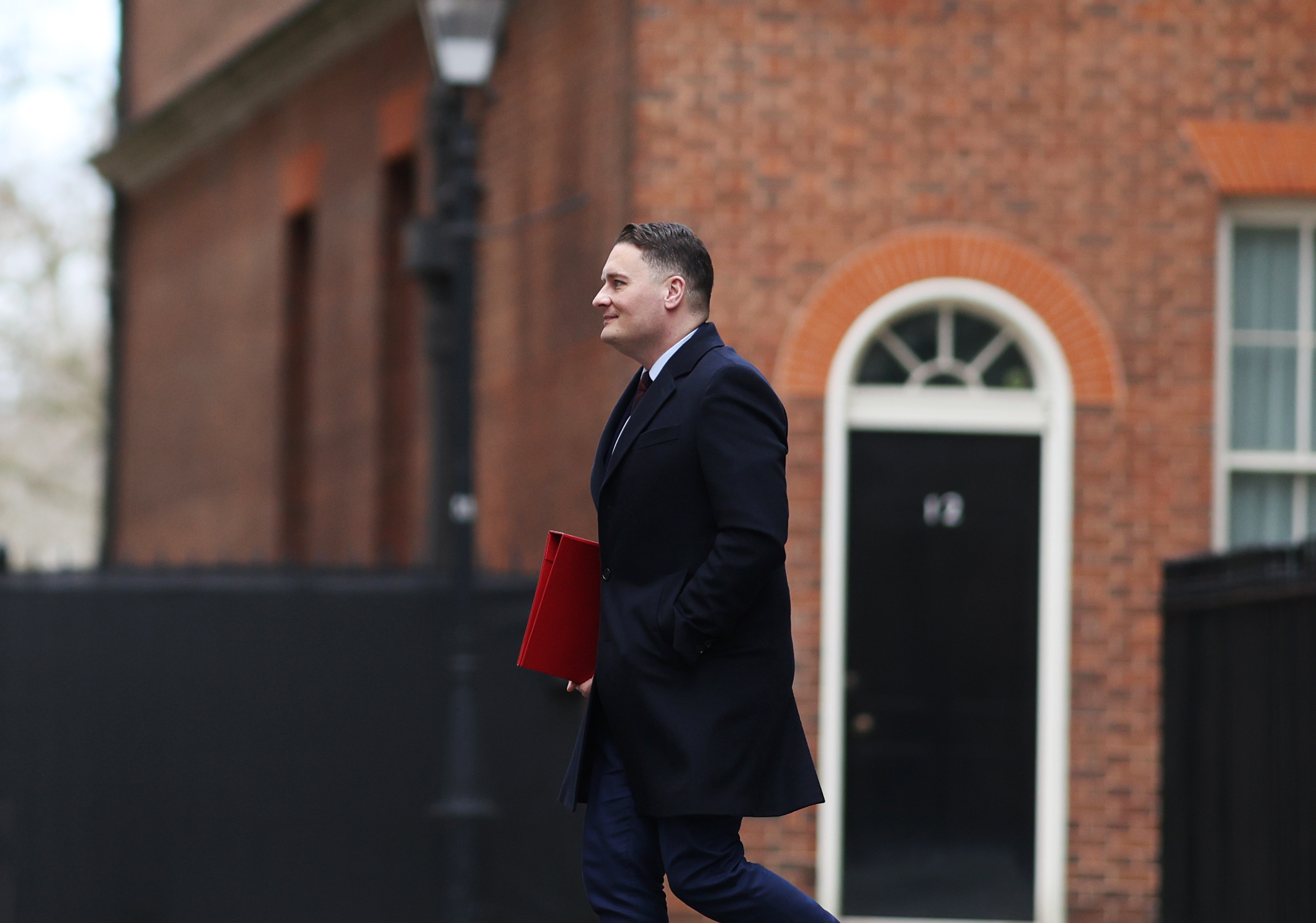
Streeting leaving Downing Street, March 2026.

On 9 September 2025, Streeting defended then-UK ambassador to the US Peter Mandelson, stating that he should not be judged as "guilty by association" for his links to convicted sex offender Jeffrey Epstein. The defence came after US committee documents were released within which he called the offender his "best pal". In an interview on Sky News, Streeting said that Mandelson "deeply regrets ever having been introduced" to Epstein. He argued against dismissing someone based purely on their past connections, stating, "I don't think we should regard everyone as guilty by association". Streeting also highlighted the importance of justice for Epstein's victims, stating they should receive a platform to tell their stories. In February 2026, following the subsequent revelations, Streeting took a more critical position, stating Mandelson betrayed his country. It was reported that Streeting's prior friendship with Mandelson could prevent him from launching a potential leadership challenge to Starmer.

In November 2025, Streeting condemned strikes by resident doctors in England as "morally reprehensible" and stated that the strikes would threaten the future of the NHS. He said the British Medical Association was a "cartel-like" union and no longer a professional voice for doctors. Later that month, the Institute for Government accused Streeting of a "chaotic and incoherent approach" to reforming the NHS making it unlikely the government will hit its own targets.

On 14 May 2026, Streeting resigned as Health Secretary and said he no longer had confidence in Starmer's leadership. In his resignation letter, Streeting called for a Labour leadership contest with a "broad" range of candidates, which was interpreted as an acknowledgement that he lacked the required 81 nominations from sitting Labour MPs in order to kickstart a leadership race himself. Streeting rejected this on 16 June, stating that he did have the required number of supporters, but wanted a "genuine contest" and not an "unopposed coronation".

=== Return to the backbenches (2026) ===
On 16 May 2026, Streeting confirmed that he would stand if a Labour leadership contest was triggered. On 21 May Streeting's organizers told The Times that, if Andy Burnham won the Makerfield by-election, he would withdraw from the race. However, sources close to Streeting said this claim was "rubbish".

After the resignation of Starmer on 22 June, Streeting declined to stand in the leadership election and endorsed Burnham.

=== Defence Secretary (2026–) ===
Streeting meets U.S. Secretary of Defense Pete Hegseth at the Pentagon in Washington, D.C., on 15 October 2026

On 20 July 2026, Streeting was appointed Defence Secretary under Andy Burnham. The former head of the British Army Lord Dannatt, commenting about reports that Streeting could take over leading the Ministry of Defence, said he would be "very disappointed if that's the case".

The day after taking office, Streeting and Home Secretary Shabana Mahmood were heard on camera making comments over the early prisoner release scheme with Justice Secretary Alex Norris. Streeting described Norris as "the enemy now" while Mahmood responded "no he's not", and Streeting then stated that "he wants to let them all out". Both Streeting and Mahmood subsequently apologised, with Streeting stating "I hope everyone can see there was no ill intent behind this ribbing of the new justice secretary - it was a reference to an old May/Clarke joke".

In July 2026, shortly after taking office as Defence Secretary, Streeting said that Israel's military conduct in the Gaza Strip and the West Bank had fallen short of British standards. He also reaffirmed Israel's right to self-defence.

On 20 October 2026, Streeting described Houthi attacks on Saudi Arabia as "absolutely despicable". He announced the deployment of Royal Air Force Eurofighter Typhoon jets to protect Saudi cities and critical infrastructure from Houthi missile and drone attacks, stating that the aircraft would not carry out offensive strikes against Houthi targets in Yemen.

== Political positions ==
Streeting has said he suggested "working with the best of British business to reform the worst of British capitalism". In 2020, Streeting said he wanted to tax capital gains on the same basis as income and suggested replacing inheritance tax with a lifetime gifts tax. He supports an increase in corporation tax. He has promoted the establishment of a Good Work Commission to bring together the relevant stakeholders to negotiate a new employment rights settlement.

Although Streeting is considered to be on the right of the Labour Party, he said in 2022 he objected to being labelled a Blairite: "There's no future for the Labour Party if it's locked in a battle between two competing visions of the past. I don't like being pigeonholed." Following his election, Streeting was described as a "long-time critic" of Jeremy Corbyn, who was leader of the Labour Party from 2015 until 2020. He accused Corbyn of a "flat-footed and lackadaisical attitude" to tackling antisemitism, which was "simply unacceptable". Streeting was among the 70 per cent of Labour MPs who nominated Owen Smith in the 2016 party leadership election. In 2022, Streeting said, "I always thought that Jeremy Corbyn was unelectable and there was a fundamental moral objection to where he was on anti-Semitism."

Streeting is pro-devolution, supporting the idea of providing local authorities with greater control over public policy. He is a member of the Fabian Society.

In May 2026, Streeting backed a social media ban for under-16s in the UK.

=== European Union and immigration ===
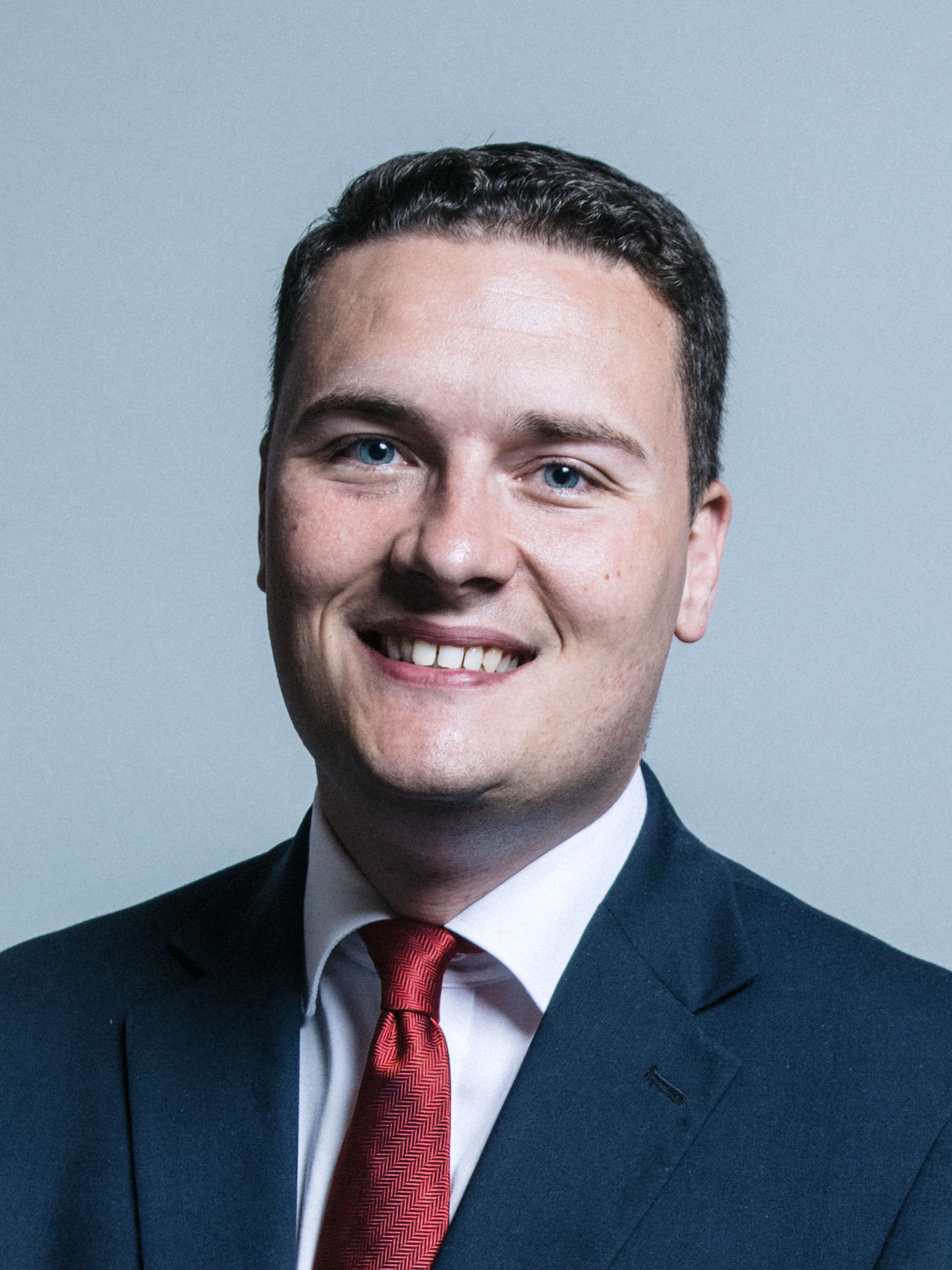
MP portrait, 2017

Streeting campaigned in favour of the United Kingdom remaining in the European Union (EU) in the run-up to the 2016 EU membership referendum. In 2018, he stated that a hard Brexit would address voters' concerns regarding sovereignty and migration but would provoke significant economic harm. Streeting appeared in The Sun and tweeted a link to the article saying he would be "tough on crime, tough on the causes of crime". In 2018, Streeting said of immigration to the United Kingdom: "I regularly make the point that we need better education and training for our own people, but we should be honest with our country that we also rely on attracting people from overseas, particularly with our ageing population and shrinking working age population."

In a speech at Progress in May 2026, Streeting called for the United Kingdom to pursue a "new special relationship" and to rejoin the European Union in the future. He said he views that leaving was a 'catastrophic mistake'.

=== NHS ===
On health, in December 2021, in response to growing waiting times in the National Health Service (NHS), Streeting said the way to reduce waiting times was better pay and conditions, while keeping a check on the six-figure salaries of managers and management consultants. Following a visit to Israel in May 2022, Streeting suggested that the UK should embrace new technologies in the health sector that are commonplace in Israel to improve outcomes. In January 2022, Streeting said that he supported the use of private providers in the NHS to cut waiting lists. In June 2023, Streeting said that the NHS requires three big shifts: "from an excessive focus on hospital care to more focus on neighbourhood and community services; from an analogue service to one that embraces the technological revolution; and from sickness to prevention." In January 2024, he also defended "nanny state" reforms, saying Labour would not "stand by while children become fatter and unhealthier".

Streeting is opposed to legislation on assisted dying, announcing in October 2024 that he would be voting against Kim Leadbeater's Terminally Ill Adults (End of Life) Bill. The Labour government gave its MPs a free vote on the legislation, and Streeting said he was concerned the current state of palliative care meant patients could feel 'guilt-tripped' into ending their lives. He attracted criticism from some colleagues including Harriet Harman for ordering a review of the costs of assisted dying, warning that it would “come at the expense of other choices”.

=== LGBTQ issues ===
In 2019, Streeting criticised those campaigning against same-sex relationship education in schools.

Previously supportive of trans rights and stating that "trans women are women, trans men are men", in January 2024, he supported hospital wards separated by sex recorded at birth, with separate accommodation for transgender patients. When asked if transgender women are women on a Talkradio interview show in May 2024, he said: "Men have penises, women have vaginas; here ends my biology lesson." He has also said it was wrong to claim that people who believe sex is biologically fixed, such as Labour MP Rosie Duffield, are "bigoted", and apologised to Duffield for previously criticising her views. After the 2024 general election, Streeting defended and extended the previous Conservative government's ban on prescriptions of puberty blockers to transgender youth, and announced an indefinite ban of puberty blocker prescriptions for transgender under-18s in both the NHS and private sector in December of the same year.

Trans Kids Deserve Better, a group of teenage transgender-activists, tried to meet with Streeting several times to argue for their rights to access healthcare, but according to QueerAF he refused to speak to the group.

Trans rights campaigners have criticised Streeting for his association with Bayswater Support Group, an advocacy organisation for parents who reject their transgender children's identities. Streeting has met with Bayswater representatives multiple times, and solicited their views in government consultations on trans healthcare. When this was revealed in February 2025, 4 LGBTQ+ affiliate groups from 3 different political parties called for Streeting to resign because of Bayswater's links to conversion practices. Streeting has refused to comment publicly on his association with Bayswater.

In April 2025, after being confronted by protesters who oppose NHS privatisation and restrictions on transgender healthcare at a trade union conference in Liverpool, Streeting apologised for the "fear and anxiety" caused by the ban on puberty blockers for transgender children, but said he was following clinical advice.

=== Middle East policy ===
Streeting is a member of Labour Friends of Israel - and in 2022, they paid for Streeting's visit to Israel. Previously, Streeting had supported targeted sanctions against Israel. In January 2024, Streeting described the ICJ genocide case against Israel as a “distraction”. In later-released private messages to Peter Mandelson, Streeting described Israel a "rogue state" whose government should be treated as "pariahs", advocating for "sanctions applied to the state, not just a few ministers".

== In popular culture ==
In the inaugural season of Saturday Night Live UK, Wes Streeting was portrayed by Jack Shep in a cold open sketch in the season finale where Streeting, Andy Burnham (portrayed by Paddy Young) and Angela Rayner (portrayed by Celeste Dring) were having "property viewings" of 10 Downing Street.

== Personal life ==
Streeting at the Pride in London parade on 29 June 2013

Streeting lives in Redbridge, London, with his partner Joe Dancey, a communications and public affairs adviser. He has been engaged to Dancey since 2013. In October 2023, Dancey was selected as Labour's prospective parliamentary candidate for Stockton West at the 2024 general election, although he was unsuccessful.

Streeting, who is a practising Anglican, has said his faith is "about compassion, not walking by on the other side", and that it caused serious problems when it came to his sexuality: "My faith was a really big obstacle to accepting myself ... I spent many years choosing not to be gay."

In May 2021, Streeting revealed he had been diagnosed with kidney cancer and would be stepping back from frontline politics while he received treatment for it. He had received a phone call from his urologist informing him that tests, initially for kidney stones, revealed he had kidney cancer. He was on a campaign visit at the time. However, because the cancer was noticed early, his prognosis was good even though he needed surgery to remove the kidney. On 27 July 2021, Streeting announced that he had been declared cancer-free, following an operation to remove one of his kidneys.

Streeting published his memoir One Boy, Two Bills and a Fry-Up, in June 2023. The book received generally positive reviews. Rachel Cooke of The Observer described the book as "both a little bit boring and unexpectedly fascinating". Jason Cowley of The Sunday Times praised Streeting for telling "his story with emotional intelligence. He is never self-aggrandising, yet part of his appeal is his naked ambition; in a 2024 interview he was unequivocal about wanting one day to be prime minister. This is the self-made East End boy speaking." Robert Colls of Literary Review was more critical, writing that "There are few ideas here that might take us deeper or wider. Streeting is a self-confessed Christian geek who never stopped reading and who wore his school merit badges with pride, but I was left searching for the intellect on which all his achievements were built. Maybe it will be in the next book."

== Electoral history ==
=== 2020s ===
General election 2024: Ilford North
Party	Candidate	Votes	%	±%
Labour	Wes Streeting	15,647	33.4	▼20.7
Independent	Leanne Mohamad	15,119	32.2	New
Conservative	Kaz Rizvi	9,619	20.5	▼16.2
Reform	Alex Wilson	3,621	7.7	▲5.8
Green	Rachel Collinson	1,794	3.8	▲2.4
Liberal Democrats	Fraser Coppin	1,088	2.3	▼1.7
Majority		528	1.2	▼9.2
Turnout		47,008	59.76	▼9.1
Registered electors		78,657		
Labour hold		Swing		

=== 2010s ===
General election 2019: Ilford North
Party	Candidate	Votes	%	±%
Labour	Wes Streeting	25,323	50.5	−7.3
Conservative	Howard Berlin	20,105	40.1	+0.5
Liberal Democrats	Mark Johnson	2,680	5.4	+3.5
Brexit Party	Neil Anderson	960	1.9	New
Green	David Reynolds	845	1.7	New
CPA	Donald Akhigbe	201	0.4	New
Majority		5,198	10.4	−7.8
Turnout		50,134	68.7	−6.1
Registered electors		72,963		
Labour hold		Swing	−3.9	

General election 2017: Ilford North
Party	Candidate	Votes	%	±%
Labour	Wes Streeting	30,589	57.8	+13.9
Conservative	Lee Scott	20,950	39.6	−3.1
Liberal Democrats	Richard Clare	1,034	2.0	−0.4
Independent	Doris Osen	368	0.7	+0.5
Majority		9,639	18.2	+17.0
Turnout		52,941	74.8	+9.8
Registered electors		70,791		
Labour hold		Swing	+8.5	

General election 2015: Ilford North
Party	Candidate	Votes	%	±%
Labour	Wes Streeting	21,463	43.9	+9.6
Conservative	Lee Scott	20,874	42.7	−3.1
UKIP	Philip Hyde	4,355	8.9	+7.0
Liberal Democrats	Richard Clare	1,130	2.3	−10.4
Green	David Reynolds	1,023	2.1	+0.9
Independent	Doris Osen	87	0.2	New
Majority		589	1.2	N/A
Turnout		48,932	65.0	−0.2
Registered electors		75,294		
Labour gain from Conservative		Swing	+6.4	

Non-profit organization positions
Preceded by Gemma Tumelty	President of the National Union of Students; 2008–2010	Succeeded by Aaron Porter
Parliament of the United Kingdom
Preceded by Lee Scott	Member of Parliament for Ilford North; 2015–present	Incumbent
Political offices
Preceded by Jonathan Ashworth	Shadow Secretary of State for Health and Social Care; 2021–2024	Succeeded by Victoria Atkins
Preceded by Victoria Atkins	Secretary of State for Health and Social Care; 2024–2026	Succeeded by James Murray
Preceded by Dan Jarvis	Secretary of State for Defence; 2026–present	Incumbent
