= November 2021 British shadow cabinet reshuffle =

UK shadow cabinet reshuffle

On 29 November 2021, Keir Starmer, Leader of the Opposition in the United Kingdom, carried out a reshuffle of his shadow cabinet. The slimmed down shadow cabinet, was seen to be Starmer creating a top team in his own image.

Considered a surprise, this reshuffle included the promotion of Yvette Cooper and David Lammy to Shadow Home Secretary and Shadow Foreign Secretary, respectively, while Miliband was moved from Shadow Secretary of State for Business and Industrial Strategy to Shadow Secretary of State for Climate Change and Net Zero. The appointment of Cooper in particular was described by some commentators as a sign of Labour further splitting from the Corbyn leadership and moving to the right.

The BBC's Laura Kuenssberg and Robert Peston of ITV News said that the reshuffle aimed to "combine experience and youth" and end "the fatuous project of trying to ... placate Labour's warring factions", and instead chose "shadow ministers for their perceived ability". In the New Statesman, journalist Stephen Bush suggested that Starmer had "removed underperforming shadow cabinet ministers and rewarded his biggest hitters – but the resulting shadow cabinet looks to be less than the sum of its parts."

== Cabinet-level changes ==
Colour key
- Joined the Shadow Cabinet
- Left the Shadow Cabinet
- Portfolio created/renamed

Minister	Position(s) before reshuffle	Position(s) after reshuffle
Rt Hon Yvette Cooper MP	Chair of the Home Affairs Select Committee; Backbench MP	Shadow Home Secretary
Rt Hon Nick Thomas-Symonds FRHistS MP	Shadow Home Secretary	Shadow Secretary of State for International Trade
Rt Hon Emily Thornberry MP	Shadow Secretary of State for International Trade	Shadow Attorney General for England and Wales
Rt Hon The Lord Falconer QC PC	Shadow Attorney General for England and Wales; Shadow Advocate General for Scotland; Shadow Minister for Scotland	Shadow Advocate General for Scotland; Shadow Minister for Scotland
Rt Hon Pat McFadden MP	Shadow Economic Secretary to the Treasury	Shadow Chief Secretary to the Treasury
Bridget Phillipson MP	Shadow Chief Secretary to the Treasury	Shadow Secretary of State for Education
Kate Green OBE MP	Shadow Secretary of State for Education	Left the Opposition frontbench
Rt Hon David Lammy FRSA MP	Shadow Secretary of State for Justice; Shadow Lord Chancellor	Shadow Secretary of State for Foreign and Commonwealth Affairs
Lisa Nandy MP	Shadow Secretary of State for Foreign and Commonwealth Affairs	Shadow Secretary of State for Levelling Up, Housing and Communities
Steve Reed OBE MP	Shadow Secretary of State for Communities and Local Government	Shadow Secretary of State for Justice; Shadow Lord Chancellor
Rt Hon Ed Miliband MP	Shadow Secretary of State for Business, Energy and Industrial Strategy	Shadow Secretary of State for Climate Change and Net Zero
Jonathan Reynolds MP	Shadow Secretary of State for Work and Pensions	Shadow Secretary of State for Business and Industrial Strategy
Rt Hon Jonathan Ashworth MP	Shadow Secretary of State for Health and Social Care	Shadow Secretary of State for Work and Pensions
Wes Streeting MP	Shadow Secretary of State for Child Poverty	Shadow Secretary of State for Health and Social Care
Peter Kyle MP	Shadow Minister for Schools	Shadow Secretary of State for Northern Ireland
Louise Haigh MP	Shadow Secretary of State for Northern Ireland	Shadow Secretary of State for Transport
Jim McMahon OBE FRSA MP	Shadow Secretary of State for Transport	Shadow Secretary of State for Environment, Food and Rural Affairs
Luke Pollard MP	Shadow Secretary of State for Environment, Food and Rural Affairs	Left the Opposition frontbench
Lucy Powell MP	Shadow Secretary of State for Housing	Shadow Secretary of State for Digital, Culture, Media and Sport
Jo Stevens MP	Shadow Secretary of State for Digital, Culture, Media and Sport	Shadow Secretary of State for Wales
Nia Griffith MP	Shadow Secretary of State for Wales	Shadow Minister of State for International Trade

== Junior-level changes ==
On 4 December 2021, LabourList reported the junior changes to the frontbench.

- Justin Madders becomes Shadow Minister for Employment Rights and Protections
- Stephen Morgan becomes Shadow Schools Minister
- Stephen Kinnock becomes Shadow Armed Forces Minister
- Alex Norris becomes Shadow Minister for Levelling Up
- Andrew Gwynne becomes Shadow Public Health Minister
- Ellie Reeves becomes Shadow Justice Minister
- Afzal Khan becomes Shadow Justice Minister
- Karin Smyth becomes Shadow Minister for Social Care (covering for Liz Kendall who is starting maternity leave)
- Matthew Pennycook becomes Shadow Housing Minister
- Chris Elmore becomes Shadow Culture Minister
- Jeff Smith becomes Shadow Sport, Tourism, Heritage & Music Minister
- Holly Lynch becomes Shadow Security Minister
- Tulip Siddiq becomes Shadow City Minister
- Helen Hayes becomes Shadow Minister for Children and Early Years
- Feryal Clark becomes Shadow Health Minister
- Rachel Hopkins becomes Shadow Cabinet Office Minister
- Bill Esterson becomes Shadow Business & Industrial Strategy Minister
- Florence Eshalomi becomes Private Parliamentary Secretary to the Cabinet Office
- Tonia Antoniazzi becomes Shadow Northern Ireland Minister
- Alex Davies-Jones becomes Shadow Minister for Tech, Gambling & Digital Economy
- Jack Dromey becomes Shadow Home Office Minister
- Naz Shah becomes Shadow Home Office Minister
- Liz Twist becomes Shadow Scotland Minister
- Gillian Merron becomes Shadow Culture Minister
- Bambos Charalambous becomes Shadow Minister of State for the Middle East and North Africa, replacing Wayne David
- Olivia Blake becomes Shadow Climate Change & Net Zero Minister
- Lyn Brown becomes Shadow Foreign Office Minister
- Alex Sobel becomes Shadow Natural Environment & Climate Change Minister
- Ruth Cadbury becomes Shadow Trade Minister
- Andy Slaughter becomes Shadow Solicitor General
- Jessica Morden becomes Shadow Deputy Leader of the House of Commons

== Reaction ==
=== Resignation of Cat Smith ===
Before the reshuffle was underway, Cat Smith resigned as Shadow Secretary of State for Young People and Democracy, despite Starmer asking her to stay in her position. In her resignation letter, Smith described the ongoing suspension of Jeremy Corbyn as "utterly unsustainable" and voiced her concern that the situation was damaging the party.

=== Failure to inform Angela Rayner ===
Deputy Leader of the Labour Party Angela Rayner was not notified of the reshuffle, as it was first reported while she was making a keynote speech on Parliamentary Standards at the Institute for Government. The resignation tweet from Cat Smith was sent out during the Q&A section, so Rayner was caught off guard. Starmer was criticised for not notifying his deputy before announcing the reshuffle. Lisa Nandy dismissed claims that Rayner had been humiliated over the alleged snub, stating that the reshuffle showed "we’re moving north" to a question on Sky News asking about the left–right focus on the reshuffle which had been discussed in the media. A similar rift occurred at the reshuffle in May 2021, in which Rayner was demoted from her position as party chair and national campaign coordinator after Labour's heavy loss in the 2021 Hartlepool by-election.

=== Appointment of Yvette Cooper ===
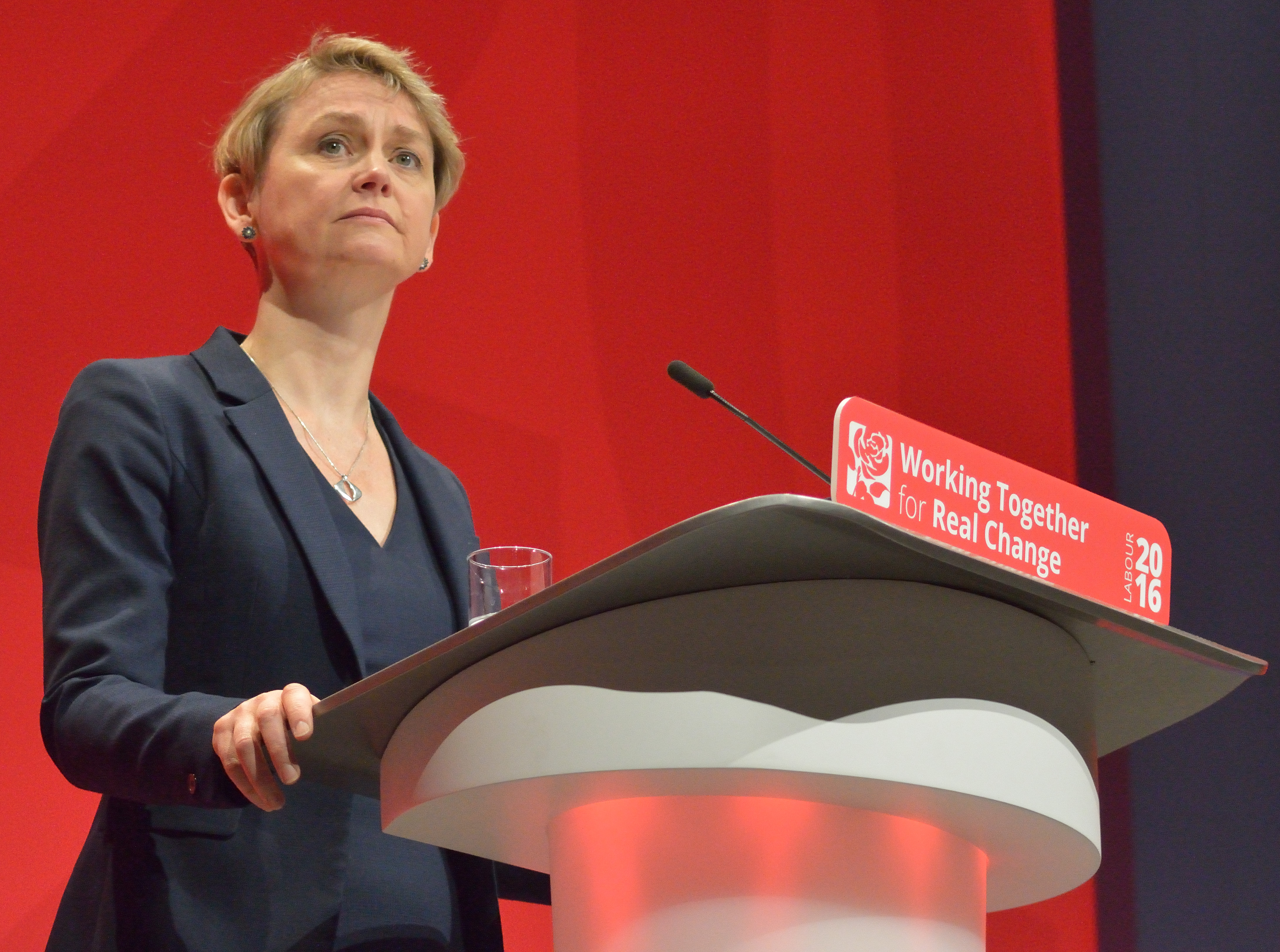
Yvette Cooper in 2016

Yvette Cooper's appointment as Shadow Home Secretary was one of the most significant changes announced by Starmer, as it returned her to the role she had previously occupied in 2015 as a member of the Miliband shadow cabinet. The move was seen as a shift towards the right and a further departure from the Corbyn era. Jon Craig of Sky News described Cooper as "Labour's lost leader" and speculated that her comeback would increase her odds of one day succeeding Starmer.

=== Other appointments ===
David Lammy was promoted to Shadow Foreign Secretary. He had served as a minister under Tony Blair and Gordon Brown, and in the weeks before the reshuffle had been under scrutiny for his second job. His appointment was criticised in the Daily Telegraph.

The decision to move Lisa Nandy from her position as Shadow Foreign Secretary would have typically been regarded as a demotion; however, it was widely reported to be positive, as her new role would involve opposing the Johnson government's flagship levelling up policy and facing Michael Gove across the dispatch box. Nandy's experience as a Northern MP and interest in the importance of towns have been cited as making her well-suited to the portfolio.

Former Leader of the Labour Party Ed Miliband was moved to a new role, from Shadow Business, Energy and Industrial Strategy to Shadow Climate Change Secretary. While he had been praised for his speeches during the 2021 United Nations Climate Change Conference in Glasgow, his responsibilities may have been reduced in response to his outspoken support for the public ownership of energy companies.

Laura Kuenssberg of BBC News wrote that the slimmed down shadow cabinet aimed to "combine experience and youth". Robert Peston of ITV News described the reshuffle as abandoning "the fatuous project of trying to ... placate Labour's warring factions". Instead, Starmer has "chosen shadow ministers for their perceived ability". Stephen Bush of the New Statesman presented a more critical perspective on the reshuffle, arguing that certain appointments (such as moving to Streeting to Health rather than Education) did not appear to "make sense". Former Shadow Chancellor John McDonnell, who had served under Jeremy Corbyn, stated that the reshuffle "[gave] the impression of Christmas Past not Christmas Future", while criticising the perceived promotion of "Blairite" MPs.

The reshuffle was considered to boost Labour's chances in the Old Bexley and Sidcup by-election four days later. However, it lost the by-election.

== See also ==
- Shadow Cabinet of Keir Starmer
- Official Opposition frontbench
- May 2021 British shadow cabinet reshuffle
- 2023 British shadow cabinet reshuffle
- 2025 British shadow cabinet reshuffle
