= Shadow Home Secretary =

British interior spokesperson of the official opposition

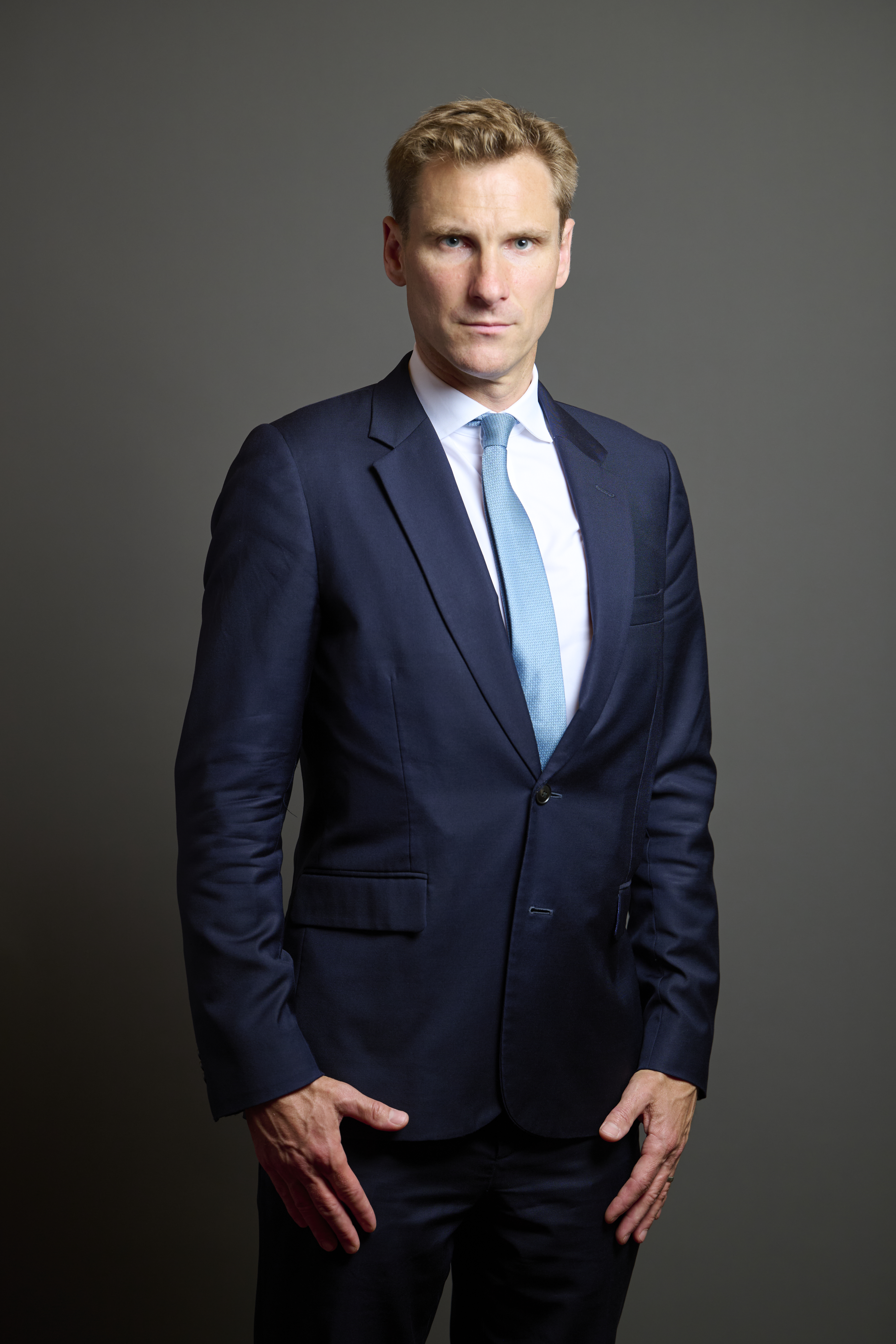
- Incumbent; Chris Philp since 5 November 2024
- Appointer: Leader of the Opposition
- Inaugural holder: Kenneth Younger
- Formation: 15 July 1955

In British politics, the shadow home secretary (formally known as the shadow secretary of state for the home department) is the person within the shadow cabinet who shadows the home secretary; this effectively means scrutinising government policy on home affairs including policing, national security, and matters of citizenship. The shadow home secretary also formerly had responsibility for the criminal justice system and the prison service; these responsibilities are now held by the shadow justice secretary. If the opposition party is elected to government, the Shadow Home Secretary often becomes the new Home Secretary, though this is not always the case. The office is currently held by Chris Philp, a member of the Conservative shadow cabinet.

In recent decades, the positions of home secretary and shadow home secretary have alternated between the Conservative and Labour parties. The corresponding position for the Liberal Democrats is the Liberal Democrat Home Affairs spokesperson.

== List of shadow home secretaries ==
Name	Portrait	Entered office	Left office	Party	Shadow Cabinet
James Chuter Ede		26 October 1951	Unclear	Labour	Attlee
Kenneth Younger		15 July 1955	24 January 1958	Labour	Attlee
Kenneth Younger		15 July 1955	24 January 1958	Labour	Gaitskell
Patrick Gordon-Walker		24 January 1958	30 November 1961	Labour	Gaitskell
George Brown		30 November 1961	16 October 1964	Labour	Gaitskell
George Brown		30 November 1961	16 October 1964	Labour	Wilson
Henry Brooke		16 October 1964	29 October 1964	Conservative	Douglas-Home
Edward Boyle		29 October 1964	16 February 1965	Conservative	Douglas-Home
Peter Thorneycroft		16 February 1965	13 April 1966	Conservative	Douglas-Home
Peter Thorneycroft		16 February 1965	13 April 1966	Conservative	Heath
Quintin Hogg	Quintin Hogg	13 April 1966	18 June 1970	Conservative	Heath
James Callaghan		18 June 1970	19 October 1971	Labour	Wilson II
Shirley Williams	Shirley Williams	19 October 1971	25 November 1973	Labour	Wilson II
Roy Jenkins	Roy Jenkins	25 November 1973	4 March 1974	Labour	Wilson II
Robert Carr		4 March 1974	11 March 1974	Conservative	Heath II
Jim Prior		11 March 1974	12 June 1974	Conservative	Heath II
Keith Joseph		12 June 1974	11 February 1975	Conservative	Heath II
Ian Gilmour		18 February 1975	15 January 1976	Conservative	Thatcher
William Whitelaw		11 April 1976	4 May 1979	Conservative	Thatcher
Merlyn Rees		4 May 1979	4 November 1980	Labour	Callaghan
Roy Hattersley	Roy Hattersley	4 November 1980	31 October 1983	Labour	Foot
Gerald Kaufman	Gerald Kaufman	31 October 1983	13 July 1987	Labour	Kinnock
Roy Hattersley	Roy Hattersley	13 July 1987	24 July 1992	Labour	Kinnock
Tony Blair	Tony Blair	24 July 1992	21 July 1994	Labour	Smith
Tony Blair	Tony Blair	24 July 1992	21 July 1994	Labour	Beckett
Jack Straw	Jack Straw	20 October 1994	2 May 1997	Labour	Blair
Michael Howard		2 May 1997	11 June 1997	Conservative	Major
Brian Mawhinney		11 June 1997	2 June 1998	Conservative	Hague
Norman Fowler		2 June 1998	15 June 1999	Conservative	Hague
Ann Widdecombe		15 June 1999	18 September 2001	Conservative	Hague
Oliver Letwin	Oliver Letwin	18 September 2001	10 November 2003	Conservative	Duncan Smith
David Davis	David Davis	10 November 2003	12 June 2008	Conservative	Howard
David Davis	David Davis	10 November 2003	12 June 2008	Conservative	Cameron
Dominic Grieve	Dominic Grieve	12 June 2008	19 January 2009	Conservative	Cameron
Chris Grayling	Chris Grayling	19 January 2009	11 May 2010	Conservative	Cameron
Alan Johnson		12 May 2010	8 October 2010	Labour	Harman I
Ed Balls		8 October 2010	20 January 2011	Labour	Miliband
Yvette Cooper		20 January 2011	14 September 2015	Labour	Miliband
Yvette Cooper		20 January 2011	14 September 2015	Labour	Harman II
Andy Burnham		14 September 2015	6 October 2016	Labour	Corbyn
Diane Abbott		6 October 2016	5 April 2020	Labour	Corbyn
Nick Thomas-Symonds		5 April 2020	29 November 2021	Labour	Starmer
Yvette Cooper		29 November 2021	5 July 2024	Labour	Starmer
James Cleverly		8 July 2024	5 November 2024	Conservative	Sunak
Chris Philp		5 November 2024	Incumbent	Conservative	Badenoch
