= Shadow Secretary of State for Child Poverty =

UK Shadow minister

- Incumbent; Abolished since 29 November 2021
- Shadow Cabinet
- Appointer: Leader of the Opposition
- Formation: 9 May 2021
- First holder: Wes Streeting
- Final holder: Wes Streeting
- Abolished: 29 November 2021
- Website: Shadow Cabinet

The shadow secretary of state for child poverty was a position in the United Kingdom's Shadow Cabinet that was created on 9 May 2021 by the leader of the opposition, Keir Starmer during a cabinet reshuffle. The position was abolished in the November 2021 reshuffle.

== List of shadow secretaries of state for child poverty ==
Shadow Secretary	Term of Office		Political Party	Leader of the Opposition
Wes Streeting MP	9 May 2021	29 November 2021	Labour	Keir Starmer

== See also ==
- Official Opposition frontbench
