= First Wilson shadow cabinet =

Labour Shadow Cabinet of 1964 in British Politics

First Shadow Cabinet of Harold Wilson
- Shadow Cabinet of United Kingdom
- 1963 – 1964
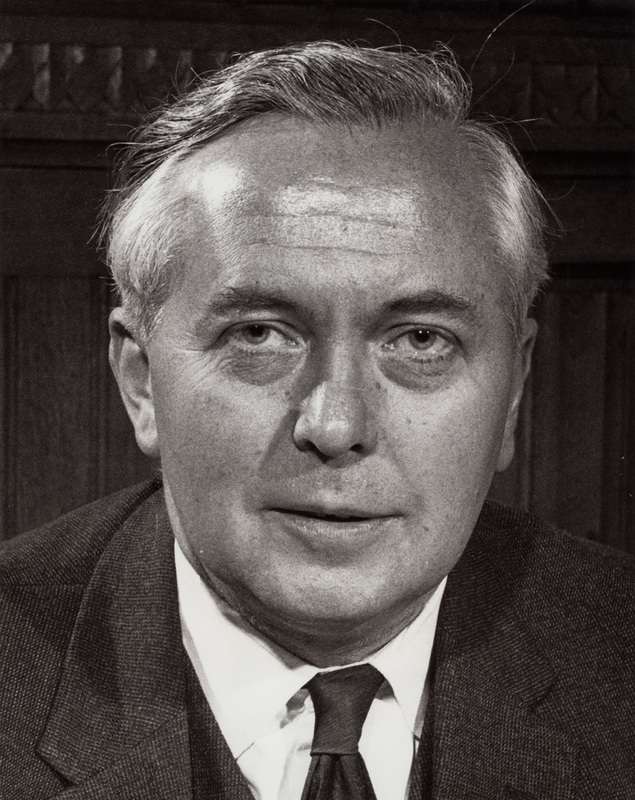
- Date formed: 14 February 1963
- Date dissolved: 16 October 1964

People and organisations
- Monarch: Elizabeth II
- Leader of the Opposition: Harold Wilson
- Deputy Leader of the Opposition: George Brown
- Member party: Labour Party
- Status in legislature: Official Opposition

History
- Incoming formation: 1963 Labour Party leadership election
- Outgoing formation: 1964 general election
- Outgoing election: 1959 general election
- Legislature terms: 42nd UK Parliament
- Predecessor: Shadow Cabinet of George Brown
- Successor: Douglas-Home shadow cabinet

The First Shadow Cabinet of Harold Wilson was created on 14 February 1963 following the death of Hugh Gaitskell on 18 January 1963.

== Shadow Cabinet list ==
Portfolio	Shadow Minister	Term
Leader of Her Majesty's Most Loyal Opposition; Leader of the Labour Party	Harold Wilson	1963 – 1964
Deputy Leader of the Opposition; Deputy Leader of the Labour Party	George Brown	1963 – 1964
Shadow Leader of the House of Commons	Unknown	1963 – 1964
Shadow Chancellor of the Exchequer	James Callaghan	1963 – 1964
Shadow Foreign Secretary	Patrick Gordon Walker	1963 – 1964
Shadow Home Secretary	George Brown	1963 – 1964
Shadow Minister of Housing and Local Government	Michael Stewart	1963 – 1964
Shadow Secretary of State for Defence	Denis Healey	1963 – 1964
Shadow Minister of Aviation	Frederick Lee	1963 – 1964
Shadow Minister for Transport	George Strauss	1963 – 1964
Shadow Minister for Power	Tom Fraser	1963 – 1964
Shadow President of the Board of Trade	Douglas Jay	1963 – 1964
Shadow Secretary of State for the Colonies	Arthur Bottomley	1963 – 1964
Shadow Secretary of State for Commonwealth Relations	John Strachey	1963
Shadow Secretary of State for Commonwealth Relations	Unknown	1963 – 1964
Shadow Minister for Education	Fred Willey	1963 – 1964
Shadow Minister for Health	Kenneth Robinson	1963 – 1964
Shadow Chief Secretary to the Treasury	Douglas Houghton	1963 – 1964
Shadow Minister for Labour	Ray Gunter	1963 – 1964
Shadow Minister of Public Buildings and Works	Charles Pannell	1963 – 1964
Shadow Minister of Agriculture, Fisheries and Food	Fred Peart	1963 – 1964
Shadow Secretary of State for Scotland	William Ross	1963 – 1964
Shadow Chancellor of the Duchy of Lancaster	Unknown	1963 – 1964
Shadow Minister of Pensions and National Insurance	Dick Mitchison	1963 – 1964
Shadow Attorney General	Frank Soskice	1963 – 1964
Leader of the Opposition in the House of Lords	The Rt Hon.The Earl Alexander of Hillsborough	1963 – 1964
Opposition Chief Whip in the House of Commons	Herbert Bowden	1963 – 1964
Shadow Postmaster General	William Williams	1963
Shadow Postmaster General	Unknown	1963 – 1964
Other frontbenchers
Shadow Minister for Higher Education and Science	Richard Crossman	1963 – 1964
Frontbench spokesmen on Disarmament Matters	Philip Noel-Baker	1963 – 1964
Frontbench spokesmen on Economic Affairs	Douglas Jay	1963
Frontbench spokesmen for Wales	Jim Griffiths	1963 – 1964

== See also ==
- List of British governments
- Official Opposition of the United Kingdom
