= Callaghan shadow cabinet =

Callaghan Shadow Cabinet
- Shadow Cabinet of the United Kingdom
- 1979 – 1980
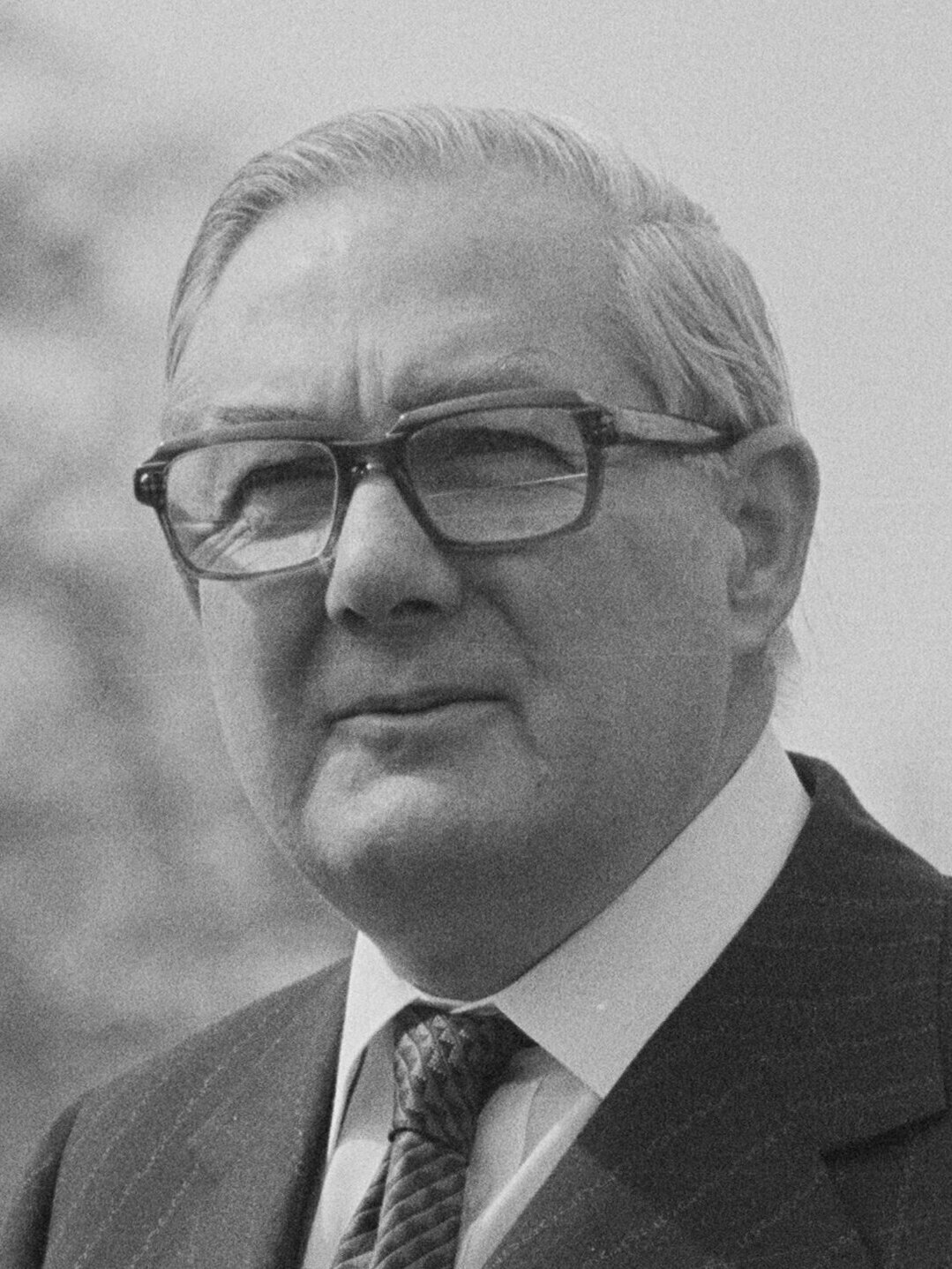
- Date formed: 4 May 1979
- Date dissolved: 10 November 1980

People and organisations
- Monarch: Elizabeth II
- Leader of the Opposition: James Callaghan
- Deputy Leader of the Opposition: Michael Foot
- Member party: Labour Party
- Status in legislature: Official Opposition

History
- Election: 1979 United Kingdom general election
- Legislature terms: 48th UK Parliament
- Predecessor: Thatcher shadow cabinet
- Successor: Foot shadow cabinet

James Callaghan became Leader of the Opposition on 4 May 1979 after losing the 1979 election and remained in that office until Michael Foot was elected Leader of the Labour Party on 2 October 1980. Callaghan named his Shadow Cabinet in June 1979, with Foot (the Deputy Leader) and the 12 elected members of the Shadow Cabinet assigned portfolios on 14 June and further appointments made on 18 June. From the opening of Parliament until that date, Callaghan's Cabinet, with a few exceptions, stayed on to shadow their former positions.

== Shadow Cabinet list ==
Callaghan assigned portfolios in June 1979 to the Deputy Leader and the 12 winners in the 1979 Shadow Cabinet elections. (Note: The twelve Shadow Cabinet election winners were Healey, Silkin, Shore, Smith, Owen, Hattersley, Varley, Orme, Booth, Rodgers, Rees, and Mason; the others were Millan, Kinnock, Hart, Jones, and Brynmor John.)

Portfolio	Shadow Minister
Leader of Her Majesty's Most Loyal Opposition; Leader of the Labour Party	The Rt Hon. James Callaghan MP
Deputy Leader of the Labour Party; Shadow Leader of the House of Commons	The Rt Hon. Michael Foot MP
Shadow Chancellor of the Exchequer	The Rt Hon. Denis Healey MP
Shadow Foreign Secretary	The Rt Hon. Peter Shore MP
Shadow Home Secretary; Shadow Minister responsible for House of Commons procedural reform	The Rt Hon. Merlyn Rees MP
Shadow Secretary of State for Defence	The Rt Hon. William Rodgers MP
Shadow Secretary of State for Energy	The Rt Hon. David Owen MP
Shadow Secretary of State for Education and Science	Neil Kinnock MP
Shadow Secretary of State for Employment	The Rt Hon. Eric Varley MP
Shadow Secretary of State for the Environment	The Rt Hon. Roy Hattersley MP
Shadow Secretary of State for Industry	The Rt Hon. John Silkin MP
Shadow Minister for Overseas Development	The Rt Hon. Judith Hart MP
Shadow Secretary of State for Trade	The Rt Hon. John Smith MP
Shadow Secretary of State for Transport	The Rt Hon. Albert Booth MP
Shadow Secretary of State for Scotland	The Rt Hon. Bruce Millan MP
Shadow Secretary of State for Northern Ireland	Brynmor John MP
Shadow Secretary of State for Wales	The Rt Hon. Alec Jones MP
Shadow Minister of Agriculture, Fisheries and Food	The Rt Hon. Roy Mason MP
Shadow Secretary of State for Health and Social Services	The Rt Hon. Stan Orme MP
Leader of the Opposition in the House of Lords	The Rt Hon. The Lord Peart PC
Opposition Chief Whip in the House of Commons	The Rt Hon. Michael Cocks MP
Opposition Chief Whip in the House of Lords	The Rt Hon. Baroness Llewelyn-Davies of Hastoe PC
Shadow Lord Chancellor	The Rt Hon. The Lord Elwyn-Jones PC
