= Scotland Office =

Ministerial department of the UK Government

- Royal arms used by the Scotland Office

- Logo of the Scotland Office

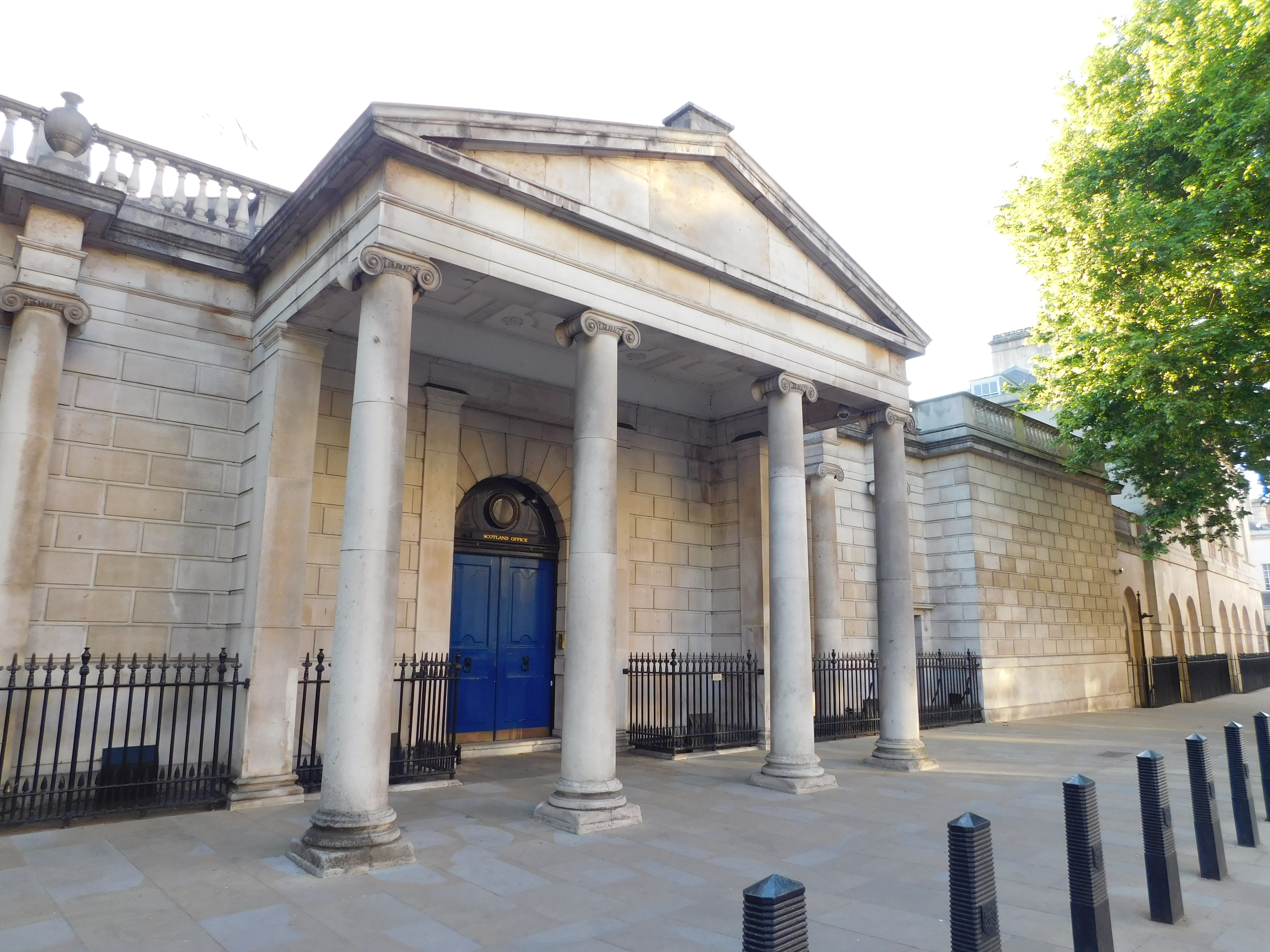
- Dover House, the historic Whitehall base of the Scotland Office in London

Department overview
- Preceding Department: Scottish Office
- Type: Ministerial department
- Jurisdiction: Government of the United Kingdom
- Headquarters: Edinburgh; Queen Elizabeth House, Edinburgh; London; Dover House, Whitehall, London
- Employees: 85 FTE (2023)
- Annual budget: £8 million for 2011–12
- Secretary of State responsible: Douglas Alexander MP, Secretary of State for Scotland; Melanie Ward MP, Parliamentary Under-Secretary of State for Scotland
- Department executives: Laurence Rockey, Director; Alasdair Macdonald, Deputy Director, Policy; Anna Macmillan, Deputy Director, Communications; Rachel Irvine, Deputy Director, Constitutional Policy; Laura Crawforth, Joint Deputy Director, Corporate Services; Alison Evans, Joint Deputy Director, Corporate Services
- Website: gov.uk/scotland-office

The Scotland Office (Scottish Gaelic: An Oifis Albannach), known as the Office of the Secretary of State for Scotland from 2018 to 2024, is a department of His Majesty's Government headed by the secretary of state for Scotland and responsible for Scottish affairs that lie within HM Government's responsibility.

The department evolved from the Scottish Office which was formed in 1885. It was renamed the Scotland Office in 1999 following devolution in Scotland, where the majority of its responsibilities were transferred to the Scottish Executive (since renamed the Scottish Government).

== Responsibilities ==
The office is responsible for the representation of Scotland and Scottish affairs in the UK Government, facilitating the smooth operation of devolution, liaising between the central Government and the Scottish Government at Edinburgh and the administering of certain reserved matters of government relating to Scotland.

The department sponsors one non-departmental public body, the Boundary Commission for Scotland.

== History ==
Until the advent of the Scottish Parliament and the devolved Scottish Government, the Scottish Office (the precursor to the Scotland Office) was a major UK government department dealing with most aspects of the domestic governance of Scotland, a position known as "administrative devolution".

Since devolution, its powers are limited to those relating to reserved matters that are not dealt with by other departments of HM Government as well as relations with the devolved bodies. Along with the Wales Office, the Scotland Office has shared administrative functions first with the 2007 Department for Constitutional Affairs and later the Ministry of Justice. The Secretary of State for Scotland also holds certain powers of oversight over the operation of the Scottish Parliament under the Scotland Act 1998.

Donald Dewar, who held the office from 1997 to 1999, resigned to become the inaugural First Minister of Scotland following devolution on 17 May 1999. Under the Blair Ministry and Brown Ministry, the office of secretary of state for Scotland was sometimes held along with another Cabinet role. These cases were Alistair Darling, who served as Secretary of State for Scotland between 2003 and 2006 while also being Secretary of State for Transport. When Douglas Alexander took on the role in 2006 he also held the additional Transport office. His successor Des Browne, who was Secretary of State from 2007 to 2008, was simultaneously the secretary of state for defence. Jim Murphy was appointed to the office in 2008, which remained his only government position until the Conservative-Liberal Democrat coalition gained power in 2010. The position was then held by Liberal Democrat Members of Parliament until the Conservative government came into office following the 2015 general election.

Between 2015 and 2018, the Scotland Office rebranded much of its output under a UK Government in Scotland branding, with the office itself then becoming known as the Office of the Secretary of State for Scotland. Similar changes were made in relation to the Wales Office. Both departments reverted to their original names in 2024.

== Ministers ==
The Scotland Office ministers are as follows, with cabinet members in bold:

Minister	Portrait	Office	Portfolio
**Douglas Alexander** MP		Secretary of State for Scotland	The secretary of state for Scotland is the UK Government Cabinet Minister representing Scotland. They act as the custodian of the Scottish devolution settlement, represent Scottish interests within the UK Government, and advocate for the UK Government's policies in Scotland. They also promote partnership between the UK Government and the Scottish Government, as well as relations between the UK and Scottish Parliaments.
Melanie Ward MP		Parliamentary Under-Secretary of State for Scotland	Supporting the secretary of state in their duties.

== Location ==
The department is based across two sites, one in Edinburgh and the other in London. Dover House in Whitehall has been used as the London base of the office and its predecessors since 1885. It also provides accommodation for the Office of the Advocate General for Scotland and other government bodies.

Since 2020, its base in Edinburgh is Queen Elizabeth House, which was earmarked to be a UK Government hub in the city bringing together around 3,000 UK Government civil servants across a variety of government departments. Between 1999 and 2020, it was located in premises at Melville Crescent.

Prior to devolution, the Scottish Office had a number of facilities in Scotland that are now generally operated by the devolved Scottish Government. This includes St Andrew's House and Victoria Quay.

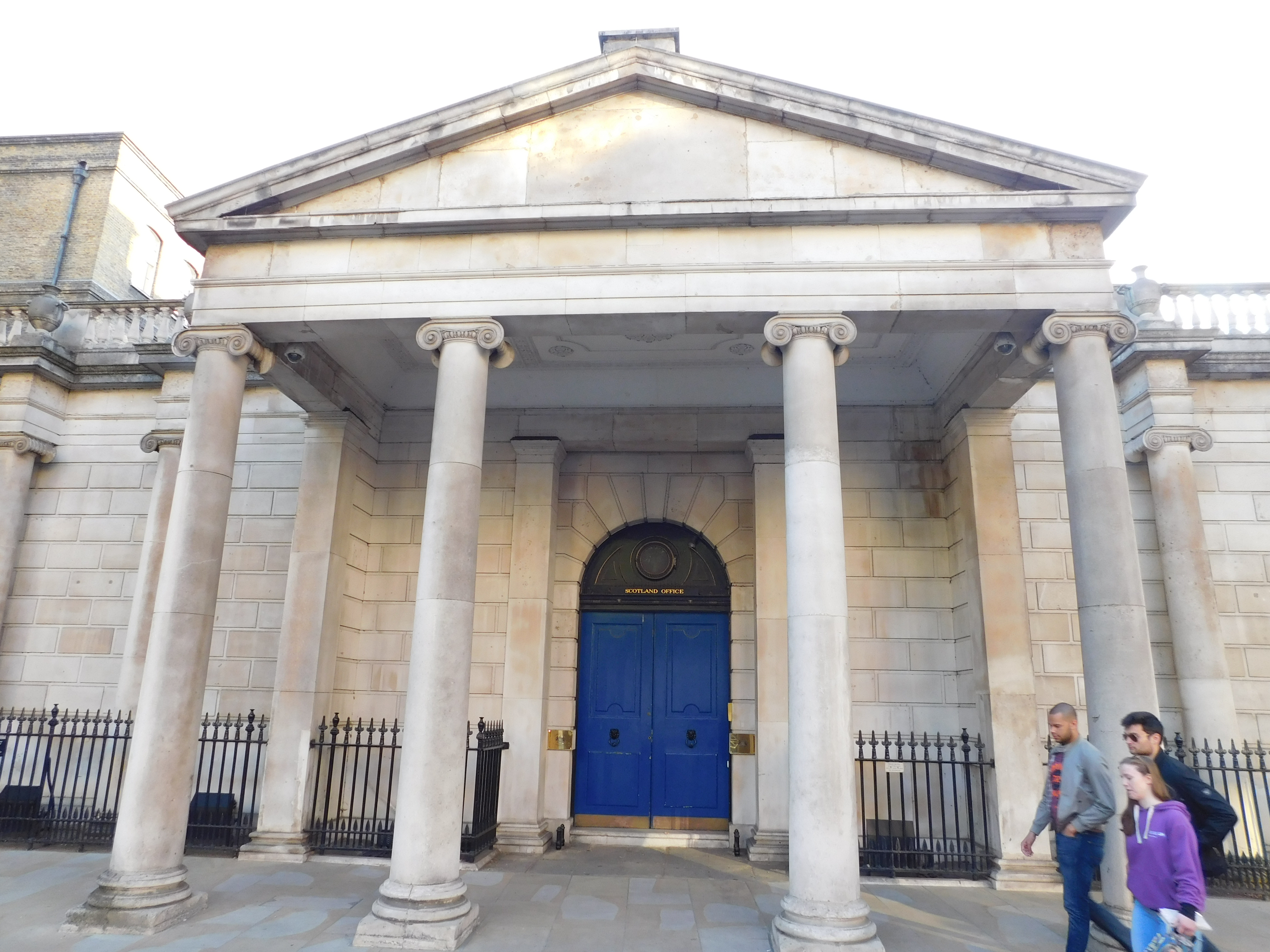
Dover House, London base, from Whitehall

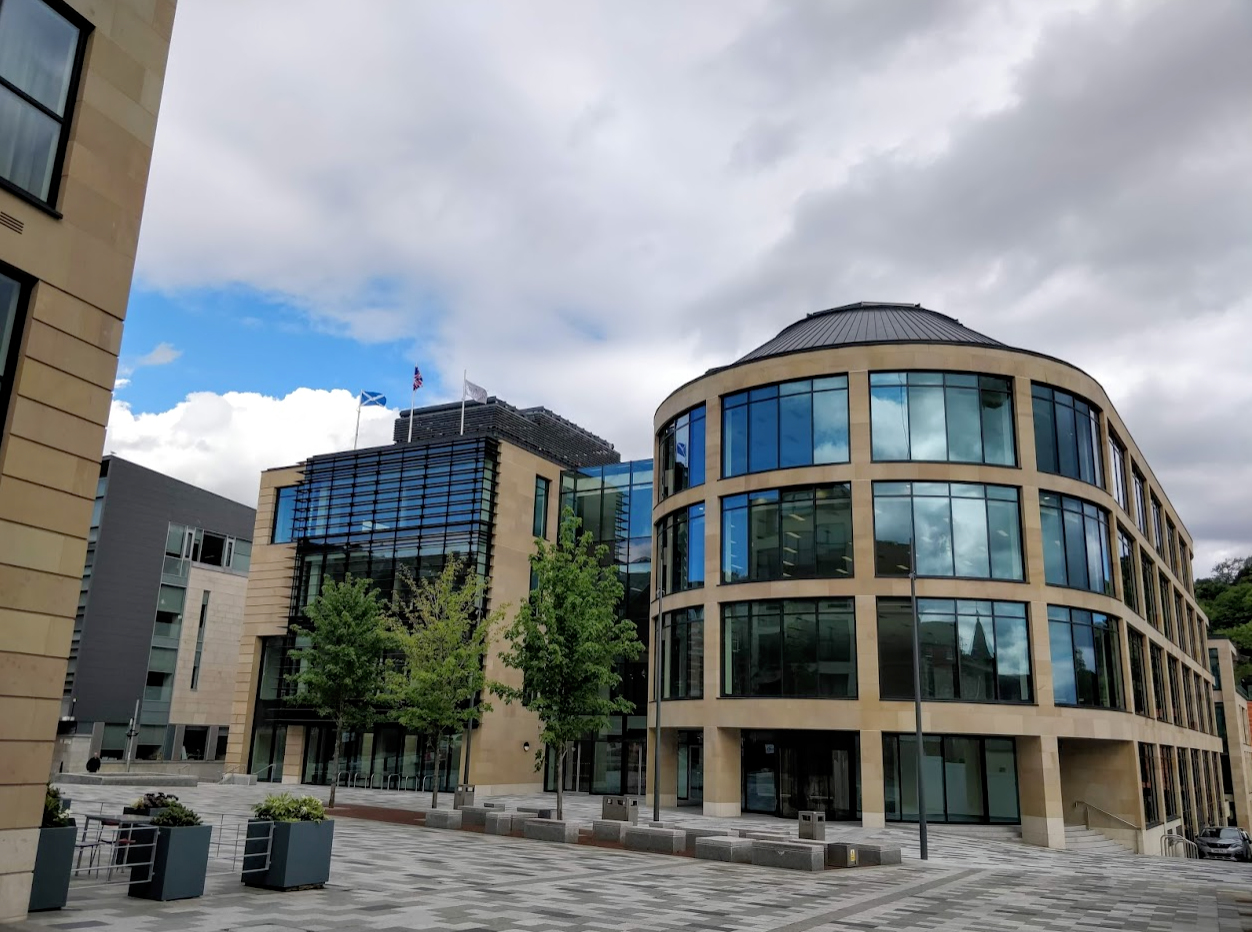
Queen Elizabeth House, Edinburgh base since 2020

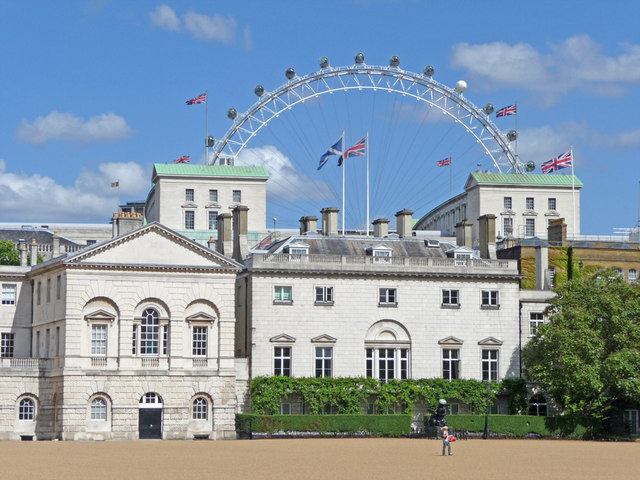
Rear of Dover House from Horseguards Parade

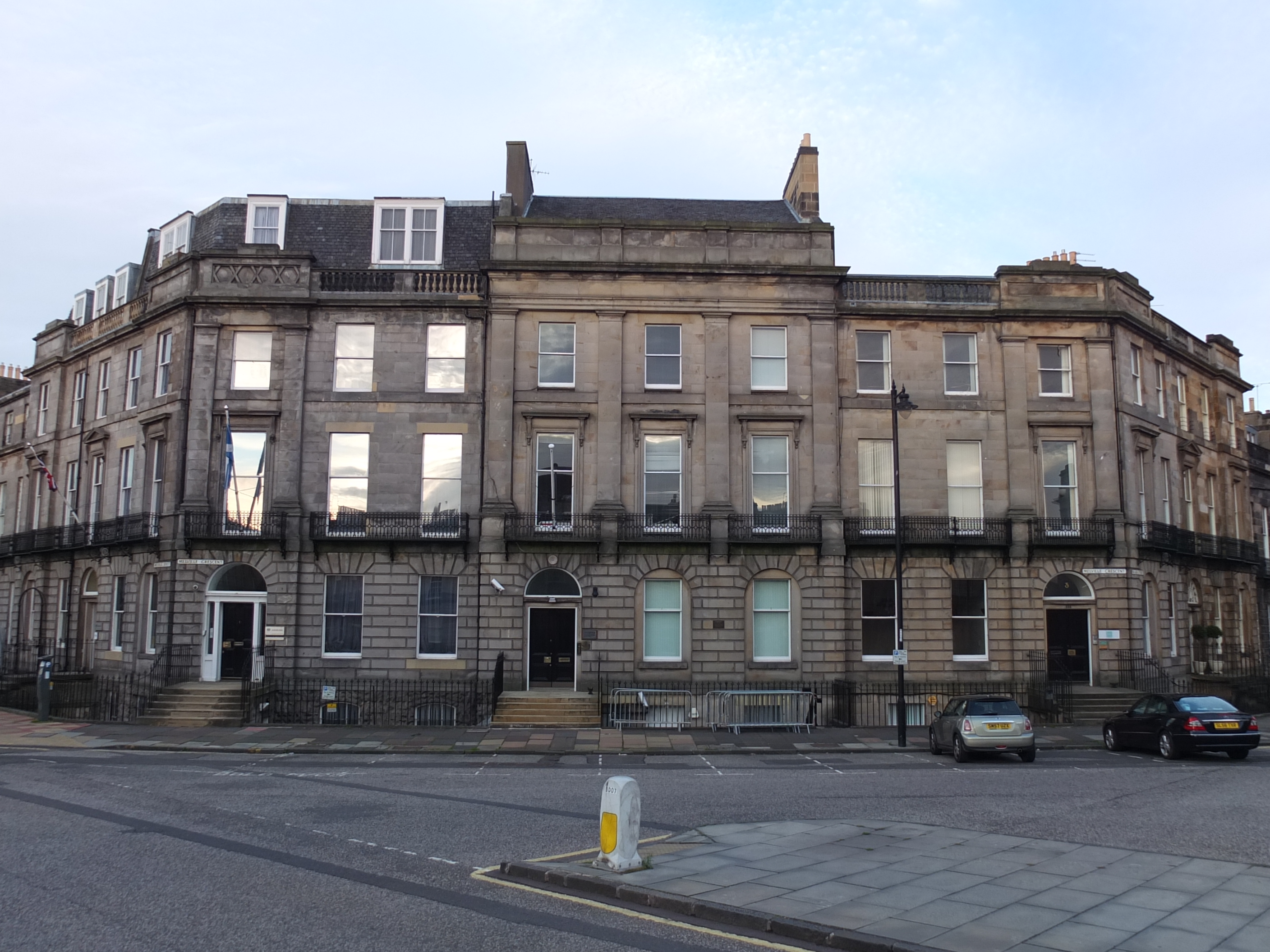
1 Melville Crescent, Edinburgh base (1999–2020)

== Management ==
The following have been head of the Scotland Office (since 2009, this position has been called Director of the Scotland Office):

- 1999–2002: Ian William Gordon (as Head of Department)
- 2002–2005: David Jonathan Crawley (as Head of Department)
- 2005–2007: James Richmond Wildgoose (as Head of Department)
- 2007–2009: David Fraser Middleton (as Head of department)
- 2009–2012: Alisdair Douglas McIntosh
- 2012–2015: Alun Trevor Bernard Evans
- 2015–2017: Francesca Osowska
- 2017–2020: Gillian McGregor
- 2020–2025: Laurence Rockey
- 2025–present: Fiona Mettam

== See also ==
- Government of the United Kingdom
