= List of listed buildings in Edinburgh/21 =

This is a list of listed buildings in Edinburgh, Scotland.

== List ==
Name	Location	Date Listed	Grid Ref. (Note: Sometimes known as OSGB36, the grid reference (where provided) is based on the British national grid reference system used by the Ordnance Survey. • "Guide to National Grid". Ordnance Survey. • "Get-a-map". Ordnance Survey.)	Geo-coordinates	Notes	LB Number (Note: Historic Environment Scotland assign a unique alphanumeric identifier to each designated site in Scotland, for listed buildings this always begins with "LB", for example "LB12345".)	Image
19 And 20 East Terrace				55°59′23″N 3°23′41″W	Category B	40348	Upload Photo
6A And 6B Newhalls Road, Hawes Garage				55°59′24″N 3°23′07″W	Category C(S)	40355	Upload Photo
1 And 2 Smith's Land				55°59′22″N 3°23′45″W	Category C(S)	40372	Upload Photo
3-5 (Odd Nos) Spottiswoode Street				55°56′20″N 3°11′54″W	Category B	30595	Upload Photo
14 Spottiswoode Street				55°56′20″N 3°11′52″W	Category B	30601	Upload Photo
9-11 (Incl Nos) Warrender Park Crescent Incl Railings				55°56′17″N 3°12′06″W	Category B	30611	Upload Photo
45-47 Warrender Park Road				55°56′19″N 3°11′44″W	Category B	30619	Upload Photo
36-40 (Even Nos) Warrender Park Road				55°56′17″N 3°11′38″W	Category C(S)	30641	Upload Photo
48-54 (Even Nos)Warrender Park Rd & 29-35 Marchmont Road				55°56′17″N 3°11′40″W	Category C(S)	30643	Upload Photo
2-4 (Incl Nos) Warrender Park Terrace Including Railings				55°56′21″N 3°11′45″W	Category B	30645	Upload Photo
127 Grange Loan				55°55′51″N 3°11′35″W	Category B	30508	Upload Photo
16 Greenhill Gardens Including Gatepiers				55°56′06″N 3°12′19″W	Category B	30516	Upload Photo
28 Greenhill Gardens				55°56′02″N 3°12′17″W	Category C(S)	30518	Upload Photo
6 Kilgraston Road Incl Conservatory Pedestrian Gateway & Boundary Walls				55°55′58″N 3°11′36″W	Category B	30528	Upload Photo
35 Marchmont Crescent				55°56′15″N 3°11′37″W	Category B	30534	Upload Photo
15-19 Odd Nos Marchmont Road				55°56′21″N 3°11′41″W	Category B	30541	Upload Photo
46-50 (Even Nos) Marchmont Road				55°56′16″N 3°11′43″W	Category C(S)	30559	Upload Photo
126-134 (Even Nos) Marchmont Road				55°56′07″N 3°11′40″W	Category B	30566	Upload Photo
4 Oswald Road Incl Boundary Wall And Gatepiers				55°55′48″N 3°11′38″W	Category B	30588	Upload Photo
14 Oswald Road With Boundary Walls And Gates				55°55′38″N 3°11′38″W	Category A	30589	Upload another image
6 6A And 6B St Margarets Road				55°56′03″N 3°12′10″W	Category C(S)	30590	Upload Photo
Melville Drive (Eastern End) 2 Ornamental Pillars				55°56′25″N 3°11′00″W	Category B	30453	Upload another image
7, 7A, And 7B Palmerston Road				55°56′10″N 3°11′34″W	Category C(S)	30457	Upload Photo
9A, 9B, And 9C Palmerston Road Including Boundary Walls And Gatepiers				55°56′09″N 3°11′34″W	Category B	30458	Upload Photo
14-18 (Inclusive Nos) Rillbank Terrace And 4 Rillbank_Crescent				55°56′21″N 3°11′22″W	Category B	30463	Upload Photo
3 And 5 St Catherine's Place				55°56′13″N 3°11′04″W	Category C(S)	30471	Upload Photo
4 And 5 Sylvan Place				55°56′21″N 3°11′26″W	Category B	30484	Upload Photo
2-8 (Even Nos) Warrender Park Road				55°56′17″N 3°11′30″W	Category B	30487	Upload another image
1-3 Blackford Road Including Boundary Walls				55°55′55″N 3°11′58″W	Category B	30496	Upload Photo
7 Clinton Road, East Morningside House, Lodge				55°55′56″N 3°12′08″W	Category C(S)	30500	Upload Photo
19, 21, 23 Grange Road, Primrose Villas				55°56′12″N 3°11′01″W	Category C(S)	30390	Upload Photo
49 And 51 Grange Road				55°56′10″N 3°11′13″W	Category B	30391	Upload another image
11 Kilgraston Road (Lodge) And 5 And 6 Easdaile Bank (Easdale House) Including Gatepiers And Boundary Walls				55°55′55″N 3°11′32″W	Category C(S)	30403	Upload Photo
15 Lauder Road, St Andrews Cottage, Including Boundary Walls And Pedestrian Gateway				55°56′01″N 3°11′07″W	Category C(S)	30404	Upload Photo
28 And 30 Lauder Road With Gatepiers And Boundary Walls				55°56′05″N 3°11′14″W	Category C(S)	30414	Upload Photo
1 Lauriston Place, Royal Infirmary, Lodge, Forecourt Ramp Walls, Gatepiers, Gates, Boundary Walls, Railings And Lamp Standards				55°56′39″N 3°11′40″W	Category B	30310	Upload Photo
1 Princes Street And 2-18 (Even Nos) North Bridge, The Balmoral Hotel (Former North British Hotel)				55°57′10″N 3°11′23″W	Category B	30315	Upload another image
New Mart Road, John Swan And Sons Livestock Market Including Caretaker's House, Gates And Gatepiers				55°55′40″N 3°14′55″W	Category B	30317	Upload Photo
Queensferry Road And Quality Street, Walls To Former Policies				55°57′43″N 3°17′06″W	Category B	30319	Upload Photo
Niddrie Mains Road And Craigmillar Castle Loan, The Whitehouse				55°55′57″N 3°08′19″W	Category B	30325	Upload Photo
8 And 9 Argyle Place				55°56′20″N 3°11′28″W	Category C(S)	30336	Upload Photo
210 Causewayside				55°56′07″N 3°10′47″W	Category C(S)	30344	Upload Photo
5 And 5A Chalmers Crescent				55°56′13″N 3°11′30″W	Category B	30347	Upload Photo
4 Dick Place, Wellfield Including Boundary Walls And Gatepiers				55°56′04″N 3°10′54″W	Category B	30358	Upload another image
38 Dick Place,_Lodge, Including Gatepiers And Boundary_Walls				55°56′00″N 3°11′19″W	Category B	30363	Upload Photo
46A Dick Place And Boundary Walls				55°55′57″N 3°11′23″W	Category A	30367	Upload Photo
5 And 7 Barnshot Road, With Boundary Wall And Gates. (Campbell Cottage And Loudon Cottage)				55°54′22″N 3°15′22″W	Category C(S)	30225	Upload Photo
Hmso Store, 11 Bankhead Broadway, Sighthill Industrial Estate				55°55′27″N 3°17′46″W	Category A	30250	Upload Photo
8 Dell Road				55°54′31″N 3°15′22″W	Category C(S)	30257	Upload Photo
99 Dalkeith Road, Marchhall Place And Marchhall Crescent, Including 2 Marchhall Place, Priestfield Parish Church And Gatepiers				55°56′11″N 3°10′11″W	Category A	30267	Upload Photo
Salisbury Place, Longmore House, Former Longmore Hospital, Including Mortuary, Chapel, Boundary Walls, Gatepiers And Railings				55°56′15″N 3°10′50″W	Category B	30273	Upload Photo
5, 7 And 9 Ellersly Road, Stable Courtyard (Side Entrance To Westerlea, Capability Scotland Buildings), Including Wall And Adjoining Buildings At Left				55°56′48″N 3°14′50″W	Category C(S)	30276	Upload Photo
8 Leven Street, Bennets Bar				55°56′30″N 3°12′12″W	Category B	30279	Upload Photo
3 Easter Belmont Road, 'Wellhouse'				55°56′54″N 3°15′11″W	Category C(S)	30292	Upload Photo
70 And 71 Princes Street				55°57′09″N 3°11′45″W	Category B	30146	Upload Photo
22 And 24 St Giles Street				55°57′01″N 3°11′31″W	Category B	30163	Upload Photo
3-11 (Odd Nos) Shandwick Place				55°56′59″N 3°12′30″W	Category B	30175	Upload Photo
53-61 (Odd Nos) Shandwick Place, Wilkies Buildings				55°56′57″N 3°12′34″W	Category B	30177	Upload Photo
94 And 96 Spring Gardens, (Former Elsie Inglis Memorial Hospital Nurses' Home)				55°57′18″N 3°09′57″W	Category C(S)	30200	Upload Photo
2 Lauriston Gardens, Macauley House, including Boundary And Retaining Walls And Railings				55°56′40″N 3°11′58″W	Category C(S)	30206	Upload another image
Granton Harbour, Western Breakwater Pier And Esparto Wharf				55°59′13″N 3°13′47″W	Category B	30219	Upload another image
7-9 (Inclusive Nos) North Bank Street				55°56′59″N 3°11′37″W	Category B	30064	Upload another image
68-76 (Even Nos) Broughton Street, Including Railings				55°57′32″N 3°11′27″W	Category B	30075	Upload Photo
22 And 24 Cockburn Street				55°57′02″N 3°11′23″W	Category B	30088	Upload Photo
Lanark Road 43 Cross Keys Inn, Slateford				55°55′21″N 3°14′57″W	Category B	30121	Upload Photo
112-116 (Even Nos) Lauriston Place				55°56′41″N 3°12′03″W	Category B	30125	Upload Photo
122-126 (Even Nos) Lauriston Place, Including Boundary Walls And Railings				55°56′41″N 3°12′05″W	Category C(S)	30127	Upload Photo
46 Laverockbank Road, Strathavon Lodge With Ancillary Structure, Boundary Walls And Gatepiers				55°58′44″N 3°12′08″W	Category C(S)	30131	Upload Photo
24 York Place, Including Railings				55°57′23″N 3°11′28″W	Category A	29985	Upload Photo
32 York Place, Raeburn House, Including Railings				55°57′24″N 3°11′25″W	Category A	29989	Upload Photo
7 And 9 York Road, With Boundary Wall And Railings				55°58′36″N 3°12′11″W	Category C(S)	29996	Upload Photo
22 York Road, Grange House, With Boundary Wall And Gatepiers				55°58′40″N 3°12′11″W	Category A	29997	Upload Photo
21 Young Street				55°57′11″N 3°12′22″W	Category A	30004	Upload Photo
8 And 8A Young Street, The Oxford Bar, And 2 Young Street Lane South				55°57′10″N 3°12′17″W	Category B	30005	Upload Photo
James Craig Walk, Scottish Office, Formerly 27-31 (Inclusive Nos) St James's Square				55°57′16″N 3°11′22″W	Category B	30027	Upload another image
323 Cowgate And High School Yards, Salvation Army Building (Former Heriot School)				55°56′56″N 3°11′01″W	Category B	30032	Upload Photo
80 And 82 West Bow				55°56′54″N 3°11′39″W	Category C(S)	29907	Upload Photo
Whitehill Street 14-22 Newcraighall				55°56′07″N 3°05′24″W	Category C(S)	29913	Upload Photo
2 West Coates, Yumi Restaurant, Including Boundary Walls And Obelisk				55°56′46″N 3°13′42″W	Category C(S)	29918	Upload Photo
5A-31 (Odd Numbers) William Street				55°56′59″N 3°12′44″W	Category B	29929	Upload Photo
243 Willowbrae Road, Duddingston Forge, With Boundary Wall, Gate Piers, And Railings				55°56′45″N 3°08′08″W	Category B	29937	Upload Photo
15 Woodhall Road, Allermuir, With Boundary Wall And Gate Piers				55°54′23″N 3°15′28″W	Category A	29948	Upload Photo
9-13 (Odd Nos) York Place, Including Railings				55°57′21″N 3°11′30″W	Category A	29961	Upload Photo
1-4 (Inclusive Nos) Warriston Crescent And 1-4 (Inclusive Nos) Warriston Place, With Railings				55°57′48″N 3°12′01″W	Category A	29893	Upload Photo
91 And 93 West Bow, Including Crocket's Land				55°56′54″N 3°11′41″W	Category A	29904	Upload Photo
9 Victoria Street, (Former St John's Church)				55°56′55″N 3°11′37″W	Category B	29876	Upload Photo
21, 23, 25, 27 Walker Street				55°57′01″N 3°12′52″W	Category A	29880	Upload Photo
33-37 (Odd Nos) Scotland Street, Including Railings				55°57′37″N 3°11′42″W	Category B	29778	Upload Photo
4-10B (Even Nos) Scotland Street, Including Railings				55°57′34″N 3°11′43″W	Category B	29780	Upload Photo
13 Infirmary Street And Boundary Wall				55°56′55″N 3°11′07″W	Category C(S)	29794	Upload Photo
74-76 (Inclusive Nos) South Bridge And 1, 1A And 1B Chambers Street				55°56′53″N 3°11′13″W	Category C(S)	29796	Upload Photo
3 Spylaw Avenue, Acharra, With Boundary Wall, Gatepiers And Garage				55°54′27″N 3°16′00″W	Category B	29804	Upload Photo
37, 38, 39 And 40 Spylaw Street, Allendale				55°54′29″N 3°15′26″W	Category C(S)	29825	Upload Photo
St Leonard's Lane, St Leonard's Station Including Outbuilding At Gate And Gatepiers				55°56′35″N 3°10′40″W	Category B	29731	Upload Photo
4-8B (Even Nos) St Vincent Street, Including Railings				55°57′28″N 3°12′10″W	Category B	29750	Upload Photo
23-32 (Inclusive Nos) Saxe Coburg Place Including Boundary Walls And Railings				55°57′39″N 3°12′32″W	Category A	29766	Upload Photo
3 And 3A St Andrew Square				55°57′12″N 3°11′33″W	Category A	29696	Upload Photo
23 And 23A St Andrew Square With Railings				55°57′18″N 3°11′38″W	Category A	29700	Upload Photo
26 St Andrew Square With Railings				55°57′18″N 3°11′36″W	Category A	29703	Upload Photo
35 St Andrew Square With Lamp Standards And Railings				55°57′17″N 3°11′31″W	Category A	29704	Upload Photo
St. Bernard's Crescent 28-30				55°57′26″N 3°12′49″W	Category B	29718	Upload Photo
St. Bernard's Row Gatepiers				55°57′36″N 3°12′39″W	Category B	29723	Upload Photo
7, 8 Rothesay Terrace, Including Boundary Wall				55°57′03″N 3°13′04″W	Category B	29670	Upload Photo
19, 20, 21, 22, 23, 24, 25 Rothesay Terrace				55°57′01″N 3°13′09″W	Category B	29673	Upload Photo
West Register Street, Cafe Royal				55°57′14″N 3°11′26″W	Category A	29619	Upload another image
77-81 (Odd Nos) Rose Street And 52 Rose Street North Lane				55°57′08″N 3°12′02″W	Category B	29637	Upload Photo
85 And 87 Rose Street And 51 Rose Street North Lane				55°57′08″N 3°12′03″W	Category C(S)	29638	Upload Photo
116 Rose Street				55°57′07″N 3°12′03″W	Category B	29648	Upload Photo
1 Rosebery Crescent, Including Railings				55°56′46″N 3°13′08″W	Category C(S)	29657	Upload Photo
38 Queen Street And 63 And 65 Frederick Street With Railings				55°57′15″N 3°12′03″W	Category A	29553	Upload Photo
51 Queen Street With Railings And Lamp Standards				55°57′14″N 3°12′11″W	Category A	29560	Upload Photo
58 Queen Street With Railings				55°57′14″N 3°12′14″W	Category A	29564	Upload Photo
64 Queen Street With Railings And Lamp Standards				55°57′13″N 3°12′18″W	Category A	29568	Upload Photo
27, 27A-B And 29 Raeburn Place				55°57′32″N 3°12′41″W	Category C(S)	29581	Upload Photo
4-10 (Inclusive Nos) Ramsay Garden, Including Terrace, Retaining Wall, Steps And Gateway				55°56′58″N 3°11′47″W	Category A	29594	Upload another image
16-20 (Even Nos) Pilrig Street And Boundary Walls				55°57′51″N 3°10′45″W	Category B	29494	Upload Photo
42-46 (Inclusive Nos) And 42A Princes Street And 1 South St David Street, Incorporating The Old Waverley Hotel				55°57′11″N 3°11′35″W	Category B	29504	Upload another image
125A And 126 Princes Street				55°57′04″N 3°12′17″W	Category B	29514	Upload Photo
130 Princes Street				55°57′04″N 3°12′19″W	Category B	29517	Upload Photo
14 Queen Street With Front Wall And Lamp Standards				55°57′18″N 3°11′50″W	Category A	29538	Upload Photo
18-20 (Inclusive Nos) Queen Street With Railings				55°57′17″N 3°11′55″W	Category A	29542	Upload Photo
1 North Gyle Farm Court Gyle House				55°56′32″N 3°18′29″W	Category C(S)	29441	Upload Photo
2-5 (Inclusive Nos) Northumberland Place, Including Railings And Lamps				55°57′26″N 3°11′45″W	Category A	29444	Upload Photo
67 And 69 Northumberland Street, Including Railings And Lamp				55°57′24″N 3°12′07″W	Category A	29453	Upload Photo
Old Church Lane, Chalfont St Arthur, Duddingston				55°56′30″N 3°08′50″W	Category B	29464	Upload Photo
51 Mount Vernon Road, Snellfield				55°54′52″N 3°09′28″W	Category B	29382	Upload Photo
19-23 (Odd Nos) Nelson Street, Including Railings And Lamps				55°57′27″N 3°11′44″W	Category A	29387	Upload Photo
25-29 (Odd Nos) Nelson Street, Including Railings And Lamps				55°57′28″N 3°11′44″W	Category A	29388	Upload Photo
33 Murrayfield Road, Kinellan House And Lodge				55°56′54″N 3°14′57″W	Category B	29389	Upload Photo
Nicolson Square 25				55°56′44″N 3°11′08″W	Category B	29415	Upload Photo
Nicolson Street, 106-108				55°56′41″N 3°11′01″W	Category B	29426	Upload Photo
Nicolson Street West, 1 And 85, 87 Nicolson Street				55°56′42″N 3°11′04″W	Category B	29431	Upload Photo
15 Minto Street, Including Boundary Walls				55°56′08″N 3°10′32″W	Category B	29347	Upload Photo
40-43 (Inclusive Nos) Minto Street, Including Railings, Boundary Walls And Pedestrian Gate				55°56′10″N 3°10′38″W	Category B	29359	Upload another image
48 Minto Street				55°56′12″N 3°10′40″W	Category B	29362	Upload another image
50 Minto Street, Including Gatepiers And Boundary Walls				55°56′13″N 3°10′40″W	Category B	29364	Upload another image
1, 2, 3 Melville Crescent, 45 Melville Street And 20 Walker Street, Including Railings, Arched Lamp Holders, Ancillary Structures And Boundary Walls To Rear				55°56′59″N 3°12′53″W	Category A	29319	Upload another image
13 Minto Street, Haig Memorial House, Including Boundary Walls				55°56′09″N 3°10′33″W	Category C(S)	29345	Upload Photo
5 Westmost Close				55°58′50″N 3°11′45″W	Category C(S)	29281	Upload Photo
37-43 (Odd Nos) Leith Street And 8 And 12 Calton Road				55°57′15″N 3°11′15″W	Category B	29253	Upload Photo
Lanark Road, 476 Juniper Green Manse				55°54′25″N 3°16′38″W	Category B	29206	Upload Photo
Lanark Road, 508 Hunter's House Juniper Green				55°54′16″N 3°17′01″W	Category C(S)	29209	Upload Photo
5, 6 And 7 Laverockbank Road, With Boundary Wall				55°58′39″N 3°12′02″W	Category B	29222	Upload Photo
481 And 483 Lawnmarket, Gladstone's Land				55°56′58″N 3°11′38″W	Category A	29233	Upload another image
Huntly Street 1-8				55°57′44″N 3°11′57″W	Category B	29126	Upload Photo
11-15 (Odd Nos) India Street, Including Railings And Lamps				55°57′20″N 3°12′19″W	Category A	29128	Upload Photo
14 India Street, Including Railings And Lamp				55°57′19″N 3°12′21″W	Category A	29133	Upload another image
10 Infirmary Street, Infirmary Street Baths				55°56′53″N 3°11′06″W	Category B	29143	Upload Photo
Inverleith Place 59-61				55°57′59″N 3°12′49″W	Category C(S)	29153	Upload Photo
Inverleith Row, 11, 12 And 12A				55°57′56″N 3°12′14″W	Category B	29159	Upload Photo

== Key ==
The scheme for classifying buildings in Scotland is:

- Category A: "buildings of national or international importance, either architectural or historic; or fine, little-altered examples of some particular period, style or building type."
- Category B: "buildings of regional or more than local importance; or major examples of some particular period, style or building type, which may have been altered."
- Category C: "buildings of local importance; lesser examples of any period, style, or building type, as originally constructed or moderately altered; and simple traditional buildings which group well with other listed buildings."

In March 2016 there were 47,288 listed buildings in Scotland. Of these, 8% were Category A, and 50% were Category B, with the remaining 42% being Category C.

== See also ==
- List of listed buildings in Edinburgh
