= Jonathan Tonge =

British political scientist

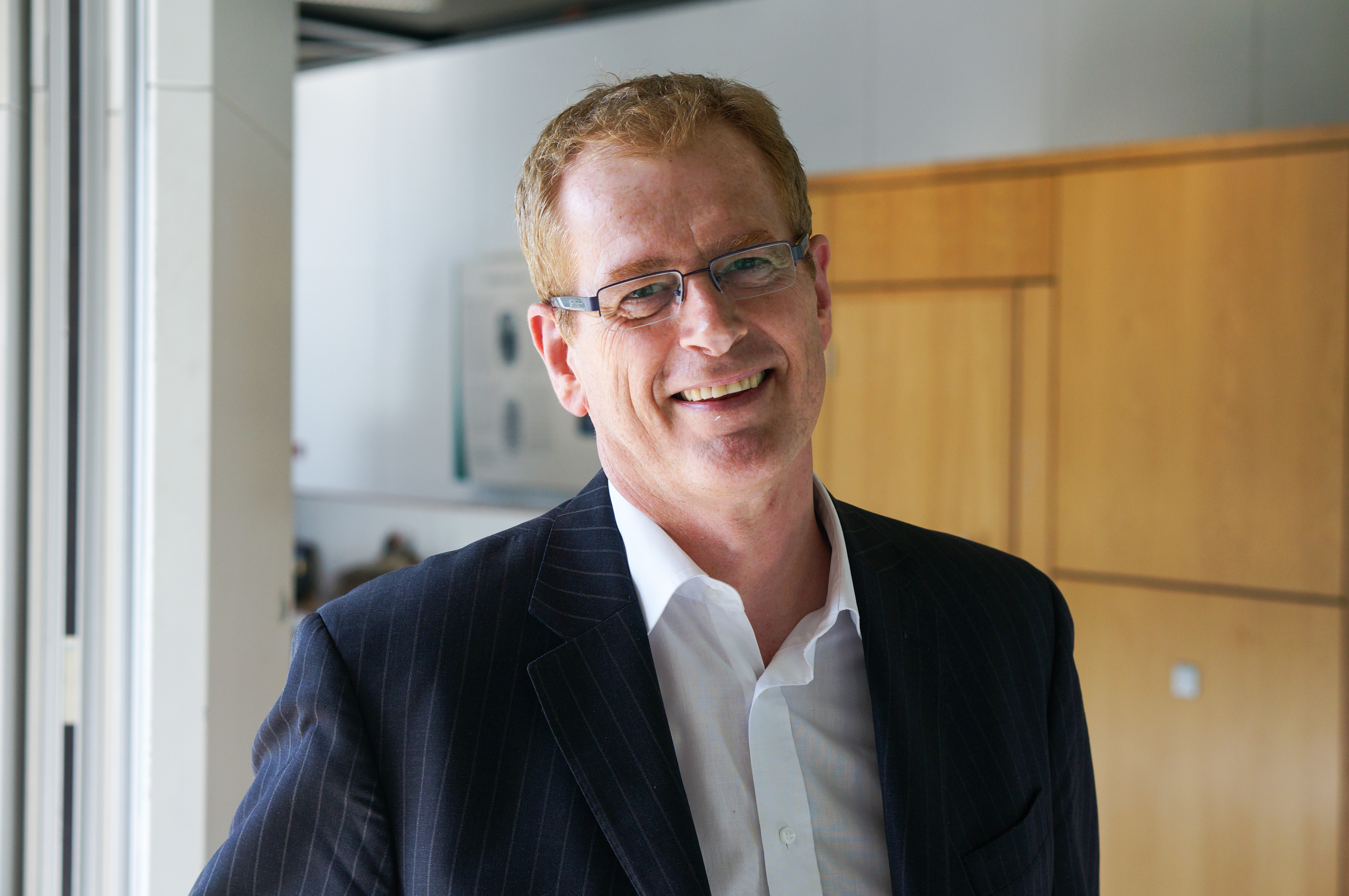
- Jonathan Tonge

Jonathan Tonge is an academic based in the Department of Politics Studies at the University of Liverpool. In 2008-9 he was chair of the British Youth Citizenship Commission. In 2012 Tonge and Professor Philip Cowley became co-editors of the Parliamentary Affairs academic journal.

== Selected publications ==
- Tonge, Jonathan; Evans, Jocelyn A.J.; Murray, Gerard (2000). "Constitutional nationalism and socialism in Northern Ireland: The greening of the social democratic and labour party". British Elections & Parties Review. 10 (1). Taylor and Francis: 117–132. doi:10.1080/13689880008413040. S2CID 144272436.
- Tonge, Jonathan; Shirlow, Peter; McAuley, James; McGlynn, Catherine (2010). Abandoning historical conflict?: Former political prisoners and reconciliation in Northern Ireland. Manchester, UK New York New York: Manchester University Press. ISBN 9780719080111.
- Tonge, Jonathan; Geddes, Andrew, eds. (1997). Labour's landslide: the British general election 1997. Manchester: Manchester University Press. ISBN 9780719051593.
