= Youth Citizenship Commission =

The Youth Citizenship Commission (YCC) was a commission created in the United Kingdom to promote youth participation in the political process and to foster youth education in citizenship, in response to the July 2007 publication of the 'Governance of Britain' Green Paper, which pointed out such needs. The thirteen independent Commissioners, headed by chair Professor Jonathan Tonge, oversaw the commission. Among the commissioners were three youth participants.

The YCC focused its attention on individuals between the ages of 11 and 19. In addition to its work with the general youth population, it also focused on developing healthy concepts of citizenship among disadvantaged populations. It advocated volunteerism as a means of youth engagement and explored questions of how the government can be more responsive to youth needs. It considered lowering the voting age to 16. The YCC made its final report in spring 2009 to the Prime Minister, the Secretary of State for Justice and the Secretary of State for Children, Schools and Families. This included sixteen recommendations.

== See also ==
- Youth participation
