= Common Wealth Party election results =

UK political party election results

This article lists the Common Wealth Party's election results in UK parliamentary elections.

== Summary of general election performance ==
Year	Number of Candidates	Total votes	Average voters per candidate	Percentage of vote	Saved deposits	Change (%)	Number of MPs
1945	23	110,634	4,810	0.5	7	N/A	1

== Elections results ==
=== By-elections, 1943–45 ===
By-election	Candidate	Votes	%	Position
1943 Ashford by-election	Catherine Williamson	4,192	30.3	2
1943 Midlothian and Peebles Northern by-election	Tom Wintringham	10,751	48.1	2
1943 Portsmouth North by-election	Thomas Sargant	4,545	40.3	2
1943 Watford by-election	Raymond Blackburn	11,838	46.1	2
1943 Eddisbury by-election	John Loverseed	8,023	43.7	1
1943 Daventry by-election	Dennis Webb	6,591	33.4	2
1943 The Hartlepools by-election	Elaine Burton	3,634	17.4	2
1943 Newark by-election	Edward Moeran	3,189	13.9	3
1943 Birmingham Aston by-election	Gilbert Hall	1,886	21.6	2
1944 Skipton by-election	Hugh Lawson	12,222	44.9	1
1944 Manchester Rusholme by-election	Harold W. Blomerley	6,870	42.1	2
1945 Chelmsford by-election	Ernest Millington	24,548	57.5	1

=== 1945 general election ===
Constituency	Candidate	Votes	%	Position
Aldershot	Tom Wintringham	14,435	42.6	2
Bury St Edmunds	Eric Gordon England	750	2.4	4
Canterbury	Catherine Williamson	1,017	2.6	3
Chelmsford	Ernest Millington	27,309	46.7	1
Chelsea	Dorothy Sharpe	984	5.2	3
Evesham	Desmond Donnelly	7,727	23.1	3
Fylde	Karl Edwin Heath	1,784	2.9	3
Glasgow Pollok	William John Voisey-Youldon	932	3.0	3
Harrow West	Hugh Lawson	2,462	4.3	4
Knutsford	Frank William Young	628	1.1	4
Newbury	George Suggett	424	0.9	4
Newcastle-upon-Tyne North	Henry Arthur Charles Ridsdale	904	2.6	4
North Midlothian	Kitty Wintringham	3,299	6.4	3
Petersfield	Thomas Sargant	6,600	18.5	3
Plymouth Drake	Edgar Trout	1,681	5.7	3
Putney	Richard Acland	2,686	8.0	3
Richmond (Surrey)	Douglas George Horace Frank	753	1.7	4
Richmond (Yorks)	Roy Norman Chesterton	813	2.3	4
Sheffield Ecclesall	Sydney Checkland	12,045	35.9	2
Sutton Coldfield	Joyce Purser	2,043	4.2	3
Thirsk and Malton	Edward Moeran	13,572	39.9	2
Westminster St George's	Wilfred Brown	5,314	27.3	2
Wimbledon	K. Horne	2,472	3.6	4
