= Brian Batsford =

Sir Brian Batsford
- Sir Brian Batsford

Opposition Deputy Chief Whip of the House of Commons
- In office 27 November 1964 – 22 February 1967
- Leader: Alec Douglas-Home; Edward Heath
- Preceded by: William Whitelaw
- Succeeded by: Francis Pym

Member of Parliament for Ealing South
- In office 12 June 1958 – 28 February 1974
- Preceded by: Angus Maude
- Succeeded by: constituency abolished

Personal details
- Born: Brian Caldwell Cook; 18 December 1910 Gerrards Cross, Buckinghamshire, UK
- Died: 5 March 1991 (aged 80)
- Party: Conservative
- Education: Repton School

Sir Brian Caldwell Cook Batsford (18 December 1910 – 5 March 1991) was an English painter, designer, publisher and Conservative Party politician and illustrator.

== Early life ==
Born at Gerrards Cross in Buckinghamshire as Brian Caldwell Cook, he adopted his mother's maiden name, Batsford, in 1946. As Brian Cook, he was well known as the illustrator/designer of the dust jackets of the highly collectible Batsford books from the 1930s to the 1950s (including those in The Face of Britain series).

He was educated at Repton School, 1924-28 where he started to paint. In 1928 he began working for the production department of the publishing firm of B. T. Batsford, of which his uncle, Harry Batsford, was chairman. His first dust jacket was for The Villages of England (1932) when he was 21 years of age. The distinctive vibrant colours of the jackets were achieved by the Jean Berté process, which used rubber plates and water-based inks. Following his uncle's death, he was chairman of Batsford, from 1952 until 1974.

== Political career ==
As Flight Lieutenant Brian Cook he failed to defend the Conservative seat of Chelmsford at a by-election in April 1945 which was won by Ernest Millington for the short-lived Common Wealth Party.

He was elected as member of parliament for Ealing South at a by-election on 12 June 1958. He held the seat until it was abolished for the February 1974 general election, and did not stand for Parliament again.

He was knighted in 1974.

== Personal life ==
He was tenant of Lamb House, the National Trust property in Rye, East Sussex, 1980–87.

== Selected bibliography ==
- The Britain of Brian Cook. London: Batsford, 1987. ISBN 978-0-7134-5700-1

Parliament of the United Kingdom
Preceded by Angus Maude	Member of Parliament for Ealing South; 1958–Feb 1974	Constituency abolished
Party political offices
Preceded by William Whitelaw	Conservative Deputy Chief Whip in the House of Commons; 1964–1967	Succeeded by Francis Pym
