= R. J. Russell =

British dental surgeon and politician

Richard Russell

Richard John Russell (12 April 1872 – 5 February 1943) was a British dental surgeon and Liberal later Liberal National politician.

== Family and education ==
Russell was the son of R J Russell of Birkenhead. He was educated at St Ann's, Birkenhead and at Liverpool University. He obtained his Licentiate in Dental Surgery and qualified in the Royal College of Surgeons of England. He married Ellen Atkinson of Wensleydale in Yorkshire; the couple had two daughters.

== Public career ==
Russell was the chairman of many important committees on Merseyside, including with Sir Archibald Salvidge, the Conservative political organiser, the Merseyside Co-ordination Committee and the Mersey Tunnel Joint Committee. He also served as a Justice of the Peace. Russell was for many years an Alderman of Birkenhead Town Council.

== Politics ==
=== 1923–1924 ===
Russell contested Eddisbury at the general elections of 1923 and 1924. There was no Labour Party tradition in the constituency, the radical interest such as it was in this predominantly rural area being vested in the Liberals. In 1923, Russell lost by only 196 votes to other candidate, the sitting Conservative Member of Parliament (MP) Harry Barnston. He continued to nurse the constituency between the 1923 and 1924 elections but suffered from being an outsider from an urban area compared with the sitting MP who had strong territorial ties with the constituency.

=== By-election candidate ===
In early 1929, an opportunity arose for Russell with the death of Sir Harry Barnston. Russell was re-adopted as Liberal candidate for the resulting by-election in Eddisbury The only other candidate was the Conservative, Lieutenant-Colonel Roderick George Fenwick-Palmer. In this largely rural constituency, agricultural issues dominated the debates and campaigns with the Liberals promoting the Lloyd George land policy and the Conservatives denouncing it. Russell turned a Tory majority of 1,669 at the previous general election into a Liberal majority of 1,292. Eddisbury was among several Liberal by-election successes at this time; Holland with Boston was won the day after Eddisbury and according to two important psephologists the Liberals were doing undeniably well in by-election contests in this Parliament.

=== Rural MP ===
In his subsequent parliamentary career, Russell often took a strong interest in countryside matters, the need to support farming as an industry and the importance of cheap food. In 1933, Russell sat on the House of Commons committee on surplus foodstuffs which had the aim of making surplus foods available to the unemployed at wholesale prices.

=== Political character and stance ===
In many aspects of his politics, Russell tended to be on the conservative wing of his party. He spoke in parliament of the Gladstonian virtues of efficiency, economy and retrenchment and was in favour of temperance and reduction of licensed drinking hours. One historian has described Russell as "on the surface, the archetypal Liberal of the Gladstonian tradition." He tended to vote with the Conservatives rather than Labour when the Liberal Parliamentary Party votes were split during the period of the second Labour government (1929–1931) on education and taxation. He was a Methodist lay preacher and strongly disapproved of sweepstakes and betting, working in the House of Commons for further restrictive legislation including proposing a Private Member's Bill to make illegal the Football pools and other forms of pool or parimutuel betting. He also strongly opposed secularisation of Sundays. In 1932, he played a leading role in opposing a Bill to allow cinemas to open on Sundays, describing the commercialisation of the Sabbath as an "intolerable desecration".

By 1931, it was becoming clear that the ties of party and whip were loosening for Russell in Parliament and that he was taking up a much more independent approach.

== Liberal National ==
In 1931, an economic crisis led to the formation of a National Government led by prime minister Ramsay MacDonald supported by a small number of National Labour MPs and initially backed by the Conservative and Liberal parties. However most Liberals had concerns about supporting the National coalition over the long run because of the government's commitment to protectionism and tariffs in opposition to the traditional Liberal policy of Free Trade. Despite these worries, the Liberal Party led by Sir Herbert Samuel agreed to go into the 1931 general election supporting the government. As a result, Russell found himself the representative of the coalition at the election, Conservative opposition to him being withdrawn. and he was returned unopposed.

As the initial crisis passed, the Liberal Party became increasingly anxious about the government's stance on Free Trade and worried about the predominance of the Conservatives in the coalition. However, a group of Liberal MPs led by Sir John Simon who were concerned to ensure the National Government had a wide cross-party base formed the Liberal National Party to give more open support to MacDonald's administration. Given the background of Russell's opposition to the Labour government, his natural conservatism and his dependence upon Conservative support in his constituency, it is unsurprising Russell was active in the group of 22 Simonite MPs who met in 'secret conclave' on the evening of 5 October 1931. The meeting resolved to form itself into a body to give firm support to the prime minister as the head of a national government and for the purpose of fighting a general election. Sir John Simon wrote to the Prime Minister that night to give him the news and the decision was made to call the group Liberal Nationals.

At the 1935 general election, the Eddisbury Tories again accepted Russell as the representative of the National Government and stood aside in his favour. There was talk of his being opposed by an Independent Liberal, William Gibson a Cheshire County Councillor and a former Chairman of Eddisbury Liberal Association but Gibson also withdrew and Russell again found himself returned to Parliament unopposed. With a General Election expected in the autumn of 1939, the local Liberals met at Chester and decided to field a candidate against him. However, the election never took place.

== Death ==
Russell died at Cheshunt in Hertfordshire on 5 February 1943, aged 70.

== Eddisbury by-election, 1943 ==
At the by-election caused by Russell's death the seat was gained for the Common Wealth Party by John Eric Loverseed, the son of former Liberal MP John Frederick Loverseed (1881–1928).

Parliament of the United Kingdom
Preceded by Sir Harry Barnston	Member of Parliament for Eddisbury; 1929 – 1943	Succeeded by John Eric Loverseed
