= Dunstan Curtis =

Curtis

Comdr. Dunstan Michael Carr Curtis CBE (26 August 1910 – 9 September 1983), was a British lawyer, civil servant and Liberal Party politician.

== Background ==
Curtis was born the only child of Arthur Cecil Curtis and Elizabeth Carr. He was educated at Eton College and Trinity College, Oxford. He gained a third-class honours degree in philosophy, politics, and economics in 1933. In 1939 he married Monica Forbes. They had one son and one daughter. After a divorce in 1950 he married Patricia Elton.

== Professional career ==
Curtis qualified as a solicitor in 1937. He was commissioned with the Royal Naval Volunteer Reserve during the war. He was awarded the DSC in 1942, much of his wartime service being with Ian Fleming's 30AU (assault unit), whose primary role was to pinch enemy technology and information. He took part in the attack on St Nazaire whilst commanding MGB314, he was also on the Dieppe Raid, the capture of Algiers, and led his 'Curtforce' onto the beach on D-Day+1. In the final days of the war, whilst taking control of the Blohm & Voss works, Commander Curtis accepted the surrender of the city of Kiel. He was appointed CBE in 1963. It is said that his wartime exploits led Fleming to use him as one of the constituent characters of Commander James Bond.

== Political career ==
In March 1945 Curtis was adopted as Liberal candidate for the Eddisbury division of Cheshire for a general election expected to take place later in the year. Eddisbury had been a Liberal seat until 1931 when the sitting MP joined the Conservative supporting Liberal Nationals. However, the seat was lost in a 1943 by-election to the son of a former Liberal MP, standing for the Common Wealth Party. For 1945, the Liberal Nationals also chose as their candidate, a son of a former Liberal MP. Struggling to lay claim to natural Liberal support, Curtis finished third. In November 1945 he was re-adopted as Liberal candidate for Eddisbury. However the Eddisbury division was abolished for 1950 and he did not stand for parliament again. In 1947 he became deputy secretary-general of the European Movement. When the consultative assembly of the Council of Europe met in August 1949 at Strasbourg University, he helped in drafting their proposals, including the European convention on human rights.

=== Electoral record ===
General Election 1945: Eddisbury
Party	Candidate	Votes	%	±%
National Liberal	John Barlow	15,294	57.7	+16.7
Labour	John Loverseed	7,392	27.9	−15.8
Liberal	Dunstan Curtis	3,808	14.4	−0.9
Majority		7,902	29.8	32.5
Turnout		26,494	75.2	32.5
National Liberal gain from Common Wealth		Swing	+16.2	
