= 1943 Eddisbury by-election =

UK by-election

- 7 April 1943

Constituency of Eddisbury
- Turnout: 56.1%
	First party	Second party	Third party
	CW	LNP	IL
Candidate	John Loverseed	Thomas Peacock	Harold Heathcote-Williams
Party	Common Wealth	Liberal National	Independent Liberal
Popular vote	8,023	7,537	2,803
Percentage	43.7%	41.0%	15.3%
MP before election
R. J. Russell
Liberal National
Subsequent MP
John Loverseed
Common Wealth

The 1943 Eddisbury by-election was a parliamentary by-election for the British House of Commons constituency of Eddisbury on 7 April 1943.

== Vacancy ==
The by-election was caused by the death of the sitting Liberal National MP, Richard John Russell on 5 February 1943. He had been MP here since gaining the seat from the Conservatives in 1929.

== Election history ==
From 1885 when the seat was created to 1931, Eddisbury had been a battleground constituency between the Liberals and the Conservatives. Since the formation of the National Government in 1931, that situation changed when the Liberal MP, Richard Russell broke from the official party to join the Liberal National group. Since then, the local Conservatives were happy to support Russell as if he were one of their own and he was returned unopposed in both the 1931 and 1935 general elections. The Labour party was traditionally very weak in the constituency, and had never fielded a candidate. After 1935, there was increasing disenchantment within Eddisbury Liberal Association over its support for Russell and his support for an increasingly Conservative dominated National Government. Matters came to a head in 1939 as the parties prepared for a general election. Those Eddisbury Liberals who opposed the National Government, broke away and formed a new Liberal Association, that was recognised by and affiliated to the official Liberal party, led by Sir Archibald Sinclair. They also selected a candidate, William Gretton Ward, to oppose Russell at the general election. However, due to the outbreak of war, the election did not take place.

Lieutenant Percy Carter, son of T. B. Carter, was for some years "hon. Secretary of the Eddisbury Liberal Association", till his death in 1918. He was also commander of the Frodsham detachment of Cheshire Volunteer Regiment, director of the firm Carter and Sons Ltd., and active member of the Gilbert Greenall Lodge No 1250.

== Candidates ==
The local Liberal Nationals who had the right to choose the government candidate selected local farmer, Thomas Peacock, a known Conservative. He had been Chairman of Chester Farmers Ltd since 1924. He had been a Member of Council of the National Farmers' Union since 1934 and was president from 1939 to 1941. He had been a member of Cheshire County Council since 1931. He was a member of Cheshire County War Agricultural Committee and he became a member of the Red Cross Agricultural Fund Committee in 1940. In 1942 he had been appointed a CBE.

Outraged by the Liberal Nationals fielding a known Conservative, a number of the Eddisbury Liberals got together and selected 47-year-old Chester man, Harold Heathcote-Williams as their candidate. He was a Barrister, having been Called to the Bar, Inner Temple, in 1923. He had stood as Liberal candidate at South Poplar in 1924 and 1929 coming second both times. At the last general election, he had fought the neighbouring Cheshire seat of Knutsford, finishing second. However, in accordance with the terms of the wartime electoral truce, he was not endorsed by party headquarters.

Former Liberal MP, Richard Acland had formed the Common Wealth Party in 1942 expressly to fight by-elections in opposition to the all-party electoral truce. He saw Eddisbury as a good opportunity to defeat the government candidate and enlisted John Eric Loverseed to be his own party's candidate. Loverseed was a 33-year-old fighter pilot with the RAF who had fought in the Battle of Britain and before that, on the Republican side in the Spanish Civil War. He was the son of a former Liberal MP, John Frederick Loverseed. However, he had no connection with the constituency, unlike the other two candidates.

== Campaign ==
Polling day was set for 7 April 1943. When nominations closed, it was to reveal a three horse race, between a Conservative who called himself a 'Liberal National', a Liberal who wanted to call himself 'the Liberal' but couldn't and the son of a Liberal.

Peacock received a joint letter of endorsement from all the leaders of the parties in the coalition, including Sir Archibald Sinclair, much to the irritation of Heathcote Williams. The Peacock campaign used the slogan "Hitler is watching Eddisbury" in the hope that it would stir feelings of Patriotic duty among the electorate.

Common Wealth party leader Richard Acland put much of his own money into funding Loverseed's campaign, which also had the financial backing of Alan Good, head of Brush Electrical Engineering Co. Ltd. Ronald William Gordon Mackay was appointed as Loverseed's agent. Loverseed's campaign downplayed his party's commitment to common ownership, and emphasised its liberal policies. Loverseed proved to be a strong campaigner who 'captured the imagination of the working classes and the young people and made a real stir.'

Farm wages were a major issue of the campaign, reflecting the agricultural nature of the constituency. Though this did not seem to work in the favour of Peacock, despite his farming background.

== Result ==
Loverseed won, being the first Common Wealth Party candidate to win an election.

Eddisbury by-election, 1943 Electorate
Party	Candidate	Votes	%	±%
Common Wealth	John Loverseed	8,023	43.7	New
Liberal National	Thomas Peacock	7,537	41.0	N/A
Independent Liberal	Harold Heathcote-Williams	2,803	15.3	New
Majority		486	2.7	N/A
Turnout		18,363	56.1	N/A
Common Wealth gain from Liberal National		Swing	N/A	

== Aftermath ==
Loverseed left the Common Wealth Party in November 1944, becoming an independent, and then joining the Labour Party in May 1945. Standing now as a Labour candidate, he found himself opposed by a genuine Liberal National and was defeated. The result at the following general election;

General election 1945: Eddisbury Electorate 35,224
Party	Candidate	Votes	%	±%
Liberal National	John Barlow	15,294	57.7	+16.7
Labour	John Loverseed	7,392	27.9	−15.8
Liberal	Dunstan Curtis	3,808	14.4	−0.9
Majority		7,902	29.8	N/A
Turnout		26,494	75.2	+19.1
Liberal National gain from Common Wealth		Swing	+16.2	

== See also ==
- List of United Kingdom by-elections
- United Kingdom by-election records
