= 1945 Chelmsford by-election =

1945 UK Parliamentary by-election

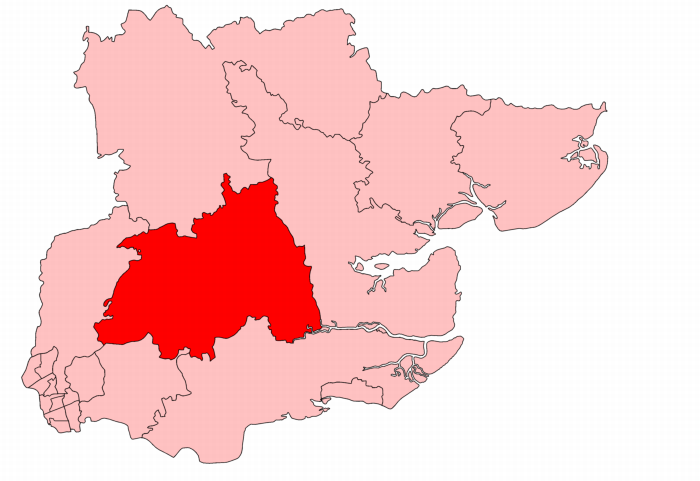
Chelmsford in Essex, showing boundaries used from 1918 to 1945.

The 1945 Chelmsford by-election was a parliamentary by-election for the British House of Commons constituency of Chelmsford, Essex on 26 April 1945.

== Vacancy ==
The by-election was caused by the death of the sitting Conservative MP, John Macnamara. He was killed on active service in Italy on 22 December 1944. He had been MP here since holding the seat in 1935.

== Election history ==
Chelmsford had been won by the Conservative Party at every election since 1924, when they re-gained the seat from the Liberals, and was now a safe seat. The result at the last General election was as follows;

1935 general election : Chelmsford Electorate 61,661
Party	Candidate	Votes	%	±%
Conservative	John Macnamara	28,314	70.8	−9.7
Labour	Fred Hughes	11,690	29.2	+9.7
Majority		16,624	41.6	−19.4
Turnout		40,004	65.4	−5.5
Conservative hold		Swing		

== Candidates ==
The local Conservatives selected 35-year-old Flight Lieutenant Brian Cook. Before the war he was a painter, designer and publisher. The Labour Party had selected Dr Mary Day to contest a General Election expected to take place in 1939-40. There had been no Liberal selected.

At the outbreak of war, the Conservative, Liberal and Labour parties had agreed an electoral truce which meant that when a by-election occurred, the party that was defending the seat would not be opposed by an official candidate from the other two parties. When the Labour and Liberal parties joined the Coalition government, it was agreed that any by-election candidate defending a government seat would receive a letter of endorsement jointly signed by all the party leaders.

The Common Wealth Party put forward 29-year-old Ernest Millington as candidate. He served with the RAF Bomber Command during the Second World War, where he rose to the rank of wing commander and was awarded the Distinguished Flying Cross in 1945.

== Campaign ==
Polling day was set for 26 April 1945. When nominations closed, it was to reveal a two horse race, between the Conservative Cook and Millington for the Common Wealth party.

Cook received a joint letter of endorsement from all the leaders of the parties in the coalition.

Millington advocated a socialist programme based on nationalisation of the land and public ownership.

== Result ==
Millington gained the seat;

Chelmsford by-election, 1945 Electorate 78,806
Party	Candidate	Votes	%	±%
Common Wealth	Ernest Millington	24,548	57.5	New
Conservative	Brian Cook	18,117	42.5	−28.3
Majority		6,431	15.0	N/A
Turnout		42,665	54.1	−11.3
Common Wealth gain from Conservative		Swing		

== Aftermath ==
When the 29-year-old Millington took his seat, he was the youngest MP in the House, which had been elected in 1935. The victory signalled the shift in public opinion that led the Labour party to pull out of the wartime coalition government and win a landslide victory in the 5 July 1945 general election. Millington held his seat in the 1945 general election and joined the Labour Party in April 1946. The result at the following General election;

General election 1945: Chelmsford Electorate 79,638
Party	Candidate	Votes	%	±%
Common Wealth	Ernest Millington	27,309	46.7	N/A
Conservative	Hubert Ashton	25,229	43.2	−27.6
Liberal	Hilda Buckmaster	5,909	10.1	N/A
Majority		2,080	3.5	N/A
Turnout		58,447	73.4	+8.0
Common Wealth gain from Conservative		Swing		

Cook, as Brian Batsford, was elected as Tory MP for Ealing South at a by-election on 12 June 1958.

== See also ==
- List of United Kingdom by-elections
- United Kingdom by-election records
