= John Macnamara =

British politician

Colonel John Macnamara
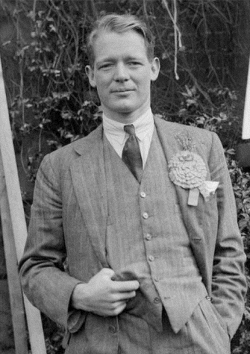

Member of Parliament for Chelmsford
- In office 14 November 1935 – 22 December 1944
- Preceded by: Sir Vivian Henderson
- Succeeded by: Ernest Millington

Personal details
- Born: John Robert Jermain Macnamara; 11 October 1905
- Died: 22 December 1944 (aged 39)
- Party: Conservative
- Education: Haileybury and Imperial Service College

Military service
- Allegiance: United Kingdom
- Branch/service: British Army
- Years of service: 1924–1944
- Rank: Colonel
- Battles/wars: Second World War
- Awards: Mentioned in Despatches (1945)

Colonel John Robert Jermain Macnamara (11 October 1905 – 22 December 1944) was a British Conservative Party politician and officer of the British Army who was killed while fighting in Italy during the Second World War. He was the last sitting MP to die in combat.

== Early life and education ==
Macnamara was born on 11 October 1905. His parents were John Radley Macnamara and Natalie Maude Macnamara, of Little Waltham, Essex, England. He was educated at Cheam School, a prep school in Cheam, Surrey, and at Haileybury and Imperial Service College, an all-boys Public school (i.e. independent boarding school). At Haileybury, he was a member of the Junior Division, Officer Training Corps.

== Politics ==
Macnamara was the unsuccessful Conservative candidate at the May 1934 by-election in the Upton constituency in West Ham. At the 1935 general election, he was elected as Member of Parliament (MP) for Chelmsford. He was also joint secretary, with the Liberal MP Wilfrid Roberts, of the Basque Children's Committee.

Macnamara's personal assistant in 1935–36 was Guy Burgess, later exposed as a Soviet spy. Macnamara was a member of the Anglo-German Fellowship, some of whose members were pro-Nazi. Burgess gained the confidence of Macnamara and they organized a series of sex tours abroad, especially to Germany where Macnamara had ties with the Hitler Youth. Burgess managed to gain contacts with highly placed homosexuals, like Edouard Pfeiffer, the chief private secretary of Édouard Daladier, French War Minister, an agent of the Second Office and of MI6. Macnamara and Burgess were invited on several occasions to pleasure parties at Pfeiffer's or to Parisian nightclubs.

Macnamara had initially expressed great admiration for Nazi Germany, proclaiming that "Hitler will be able to do nothing wrong for us." By 1935, however, after visiting Dachau concentration camp, he had changed his mind. In 1936, he told the House of Commons that while he did not believe the police were fascists, he viewed antisemitism as wrong.

"I come now to the question of Jew-baiting. All Members on this side of the House deprecate the tendency to Jew-baiting just as much as do the Mover of the Amendment and all other hon. Members opposite. It is very unfortunate that this tendency has arisen in this country. It is ungentlemanly and very un-English, and I very much hope that we shall all be able to use our influence, and, if necessary, our force, to stop a very horrid evil that seems to be creeping in. The Fascists undoubtedly are offenders in this respect, but, because certain Fascists are going into this Jew-baiting, it may not necessarily be fair to level a charge of Jew-baiting at Fascists in general. I am not defending the Fascists, but I am defending the police in their conduct at Fascist meetings. When the police go to a Fascist meeting, they cannot stop a Fascist from speaking."

Macnamara continued to be an MP during the Second World War, even as he dedicated himself to serving abroad in the British Army. A neighbouring Conservative MP, Edward Keeling, volunteered to deal with any constituency "matters requiring parliamentary action".

== Military career ==
On 11 January 1924, he joined the Territorial Army (TA), the part-time reserve element of the British Army, and was commissioned as a second lieutenant in the 3rd (City of London) Battalion, London Regiment (Royal Fusiliers). His service number was 28393. He transferred to full-time service with the Royal Fusiliers on 31 January 1927. For the next six years he mainly served in India. He was promoted to lieutenant on 31 January 1930. He transferred to the 18th London Regiment (London Irish Rifles), Territorial Army, on 5 May 1934 with the rank of lieutenant. He was promoted to captain on 1 November 1934, to major on 1 January 1938, and to lieutenant colonel 1 November 1938.

During the Second World War, he commanded the 1st Battalion, London Irish Rifles, another TA battalion, which was affiliated to the Royal Ulster Rifles. The battalion was initially assigned to the 168th (London) Infantry Brigade, part of the 56th (London) Infantry Division, nicknamed "The Black Cats", and fought in the Italian theatre of war. When the RAF Regiment was created in 1942, he was involved in its initial organisation. He then moved to Combined Operations Headquarters. He was subsequently promoted to the rank of colonel. In October 1944, he was serving as chief of staff, Adriatic Command. As such, he and 15 commandos landed in Gruž, Dubrovnik, to undertake reconnaissance in advance of Operation Floxo.

In December 1944, Colonel Macnamara was visiting Italy and was with the 1st London Irish who were moving into the Senio Line to relieve a Gurkha battalion. He was watching men of the battalion move up to the line in company with Major M. V. S. Boswell when a sudden German mortar bombardment fell on the area. Macnamara and Lieutenant J. Prosser MC were killed while Major Boswell was wounded.

Macnamara is buried in Forlì War Cemetery.

In June 1945, it was published that he has been mentioned in despatches "in recognition of gallant and distinguished services in the Mediterranean Theatre".

== Personal life ==
Macnamara was gay or bisexual, and was a member of the political group nicknamed the Glamour Boys.

A memorial service was held for him at St Margaret's, Westminster on 17 January 1945. It was officiated by The Reverend Canon A. C. Don, and was attended by family members, politicians and senior military figures.

Parliament of the United Kingdom
Preceded by Sir Vivian Henderson	Member of Parliament for Chelmsford; 1935 – 1944	Succeeded by Ernest Millington
