= 1929 Eddisbury by-election =

UK parliamentary by-election

← 1924	20 March 1929	1929 →

Candidate	Russell	Fenwick-Palmer
Party	Liberal	Unionist
Popular vote	10,223	8,931
Percentage	53.4%	46.6%
MP before election
Sir Harry Barnston
Unionist
Subsequent MP
Richard John Russell
Liberal

The 1929 Eddisbury by-election was a by-election held on 20 March 1929 for the British House of Commons constituency of Eddisbury.

== Vacancy ==
The election was triggered by the death of the sitting Unionist Member of Parliament (MP), Harry Barnston. He had been the MP here since re-gaining the seat from the Liberal at the January 1910 general election.

== History ==
Eddisbury had been won by the Unionists at every election since the seat was created in 1885, with the exception of the Liberal landslide election of 1906, when the Liberal Arthur Stanley won the seat. The Liberals came closest to winning the seat back in 1923 when the Unionist majority was only 196 votes. At the previous General Election in 1924, the result was a comfortable Unionist win;

General election 1924: Eddisbury
Party	Candidate	Votes	%	±%
Unionist	Harry Barnston	11,006	54.1	+3.5
Liberal	Richard John Russell	9,337	45.9	−3.5
Majority		1,689	8.2	+7.0
Turnout		20,343	86.9	+10.5
Unionist hold		Swing	+3.5	

== Candidates ==
It was a straight fight between the Unionist, Lieutenant-Colonel Roderick George Fenwick-Palmer and the Liberal, Richard Russell, Labour having decided not to contest the seat. The Labour Party had a weak organisation in the constituency and rarely fought the seat. Russell, a 57-year-old local government Alderman on Birkenhead Town Council, had the advantage of having fought the seat at the two previous general elections and had been nursing the constituency. Thirty-seven-year-old Fenwick Palmer (a descendant of Sir Robert Peel) was Chairman of Wrexham Conservative Association so was new to most electors in the constituency, although he was well known in Cheshire hunting circles.

== Campaign ==
On 1 March, nationally, Liberal leader, David Lloyd George launched the Liberal programme for the upcoming General Election, titled We Can Conquer Unemployment. The main issues in the election concerned agriculture, and the controversial land programme of Liberal leader David Lloyd George. This was unsurprising given the essentially rural nature of the constituency.

== Result ==
The result was a Liberal gain from the Unionists.

Eddisbury by-election, 1929
Party	Candidate	Votes	%	±%
Liberal	Richard John Russell	10,223	53.4	+7.5
Unionist	Roderick George Fenwick-Palmer	8,931	46.6	−7.5
Majority		1,292	6.8	N/A
Turnout		19,154	80.6	−6.3
Liberal gain from Unionist		Swing	+7.5	

The Liberal victory in a seat not won since 1906, helped fuel speculation that the Liberal Party might win a General Election, expected within months.

== Aftermath ==
A couple of months later, Russell held the seat at the 1929 general election against the same Unionist opponent, with a slightly reduced majority.

General election 1929
Party	Candidate	Votes	%	±%
Liberal	Richard John Russell	13,688	51.6	−1.8
Unionist	Roderick George Fenwick-Palmer	12,862	48.4	+1.8
Majority		825	3.2	−3.6
Turnout		26,550	86.8	+6.2
Liberal hold		Swing	-1.8	

By the time of the next general election (held in 1931) Russell had joined the Liberal National faction of the Liberal Party, and he was returned without opposition. In 1935 he was again returned unopposed as a Liberal National.
