= Harry Barnston =

British politician (1870–1929)

Barnston in 1921.

Sir Harry Barnston, 1st Baronet, JP, DL (December 1870 – 22 February 1929) was a British Conservative Party politician.

The son of Major William Barnston of Crewe Hill, and Mary Emma King, he was educated privately and at Christ Church, Oxford. He was unsuccessful parliamentary candidate at Stockport in 1906 and sat for Eddisbury, Cheshire from 1910 until his death. He served in government as Comptroller of the Household from 1921 to 1924, and from November 1924 – January 1928.

== Honours ==
Barnston was created a baronet of Churton in the County of Chester on 1 March 1924.

On his death in 1929 the baronetcy became extinct.

Parliament of the United Kingdom
Preceded by Arthur Stanley	Member of Parliament for Eddisbury; January 1910 – 1929	Succeeded by Richard John Russell
Government offices
Preceded by George Frederick Stanley	Comptroller of the Household; 1921–1924	Succeeded by John Allen Parkinson
Preceded by John Allen Parkinson	Comptroller of the Household; 1924–1928	Succeeded by Sir William Cope
Baronetage of the United Kingdom
New creation	Baronet (of Churton); 1924–1929	Extinct
