= Eddisbury (constituency) =

UK Parliament constituency (1885–1950, 1983–2024)

- Former county constituency for the House of Commons
- Boundary of Eddisbury in Cheshire

- Location of Cheshire within England
- County: Cheshire
- Electorate: 74,178 (December 2021)
- Major settlements: Winsford, Tarvin, Audlem, Kelsall, Malpas and Tarporley

1983–2024
- Seats: One
- Created from: Northwich, Nantwich and Runcorn
- Replaced by: Chester South and Eddisbury

1885–1950
- Seats: One
- Type of constituency: County constituency
- Created from: West Cheshire
- Replaced by: Crewe, Northwich, Knutsford and Runcorn

Eddisbury was a constituency (Note: A county constituency (for the purposes of election expenses and type of returning officer)) in Cheshire last represented in the House of Commons of the UK Parliament since 2019 by Edward Timpson, a Conservative who left office at the dissolution of parliament in advance of the 2024 United Kingdom general election, at which this former constituency was replaced (see below). (Note: All constituencies elect one Member of Parliament (MP) by the first past the post system of election at least every five years.)

From 2015 to 2019 it was represented by Antoinette Sandbach, a former Conservative member who had the whip removed on 3 September 2019 and joined the Liberal Democrats on 31 October 2019.

Further to the completion of the 2023 Periodic Review of Westminster constituencies, the seat has been subjected to major boundary changes, including the loss of the town of Winsford to the newly created constituency of Mid Cheshire, and the addition of those areas of Chester to the south of the River Dee, transferred from City of Chester (to be renamed Chester North and Neston). As a consequence, Eddisbury will be renamed Chester South and Eddisbury, and was first contested at the 2024 general election. Timpson announced in early 2023 that he would not be seeking office in the new constituency.

== History ==
The constituency was first created as one of eight single-member divisions of Cheshire under the Redistribution of Seats Act 1885, having previously been part of the larger 2-member Western Division of Cheshire. It was named for the former hundred of Eddisbury and constituted a largely rural area, including Frodsham, Tarporley, Malpas and Audlem. It also included non-resident freeholders of the Parliamentary Borough of Chester.

Under the Representation of the People Act 1948, the seat was abolished for the 1950 general election, being distributed to the constituencies of Crewe, Northwich, Runcorn and City of Chester.

It was re-constituted following the reorganisation of local authorities in 1974 by the Third Periodic Review of Westminster constituencies for the 1983 general election, with much of the constituency comprising areas covered by the previous version of the seat, transferred from the abolished constituencies of Nantwich, Northwich and Runcorn.

== Constituency profile ==
The constituency is mostly rural, covering the south-west of Cheshire, noted in minerals for salt mining and within easy access to the cities of Liverpool, Manchester and the industrial and manufacturing centres of the Wirral Peninsula and Deeside. To the east of the seat lies part of Delamere Forest. The main town in the constituency is Winsford; other main settlements include Tarvin, Audlem, Kelsall, Malpas and Tarporley.

== Boundaries ==
Map of boundaries 2019–2024

1885–1918: The Municipal Borough of the City of Chester, the Sessional Division of Broxton, and parts of the Sessional Divisions of Chester Castle, Eddisbury, Nantwich, and Northwich.

1918–1950: The Urban District of Tarporley, the Rural Districts of Malpas and Tarvin, in the Rural District of Northwich the civil parishes of Crowton, Cuddington, Darnhall, Delamere, Eddisbury, Little Budworth, Marton, Oakmere, and Wimboldsley, in the Rural District of Runcorn the civil parishes of Alvanley, Frodsham, Frodsham Lordship, Helsby, Kingsley, Kingswood, Mauley, Newton-by-Frodsham, and Norley, and part of the Rural District of Nantwich.

Minor losses, largely to the enlarged constituency of City of Chester, including Hoole.

On abolition, areas comprising part of the Rural District of Nantwich were transferred to Crewe; areas comprising the Rural District of Tarvin (incorporating the abolished Urban District of Tarporley and the Rural District of Malpas) transferred to Northwich; and small areas also transferred to the City of Chester and to the new County Constituency of Runcorn (including Frodsham).

1983–1997: The District of Vale Royal wards of Church, Cuddington and Marton, Davenham and Moulton, Forest, Frodsham East, Frodsham North West, Frodsham South, Gorst Wood, Gravel, Hartford, Helsby Central, Helsby North, Helsby South and Alvanley Ward, Kingsley, Mara, Milton, Oulton, Over One, Over Two, Swanlow, Tarporley, Vale Royal, Weaver, and Wharton, and the City of Chester wards of Barrow, Farndon, Malpas, Tarvin, Tattenhall, Tilston, and Waverton.

Comprised areas transferred from the abolished constituencies of Nantwich (including Malpas and Winsford), Northwich (including Cuddington and Weaverham) and Runcorn (including Frodsham and Helsby).

1997–2010: The District of Vale Royal wards of Cuddington and Marton, Davenham and Moulton, Gravel, Mara, Oulton, Over One, Over Two, Swanlow, Tarporley, Vale Royal, and Wharton, the Borough of Crewe and Nantwich wards of Acton, Audlem, Bunbury, Combermere, Minshull, Peckforton, and Wybunbury, and the City of Chester wards of Barrow, Farndon, Malpas, Tarvin, Tattenhall, Tilston, and Waverton.

Gained western parts of Crewe and Nantwich, including Audlem. Northern areas, including Frodsham and Helsby, transferred to the new constituency of Weaver Vale.

2010–2019: The Parliamentary Constituencies (England) Order 2007 defined the boundaries as:

The Borough of Vale Royal wards of Cuddington and Oakmere, Davenham and Moulton, Mara, Tarporley and Oulton, Winsford Dene, Winsford Gravel, Winsford Over, Winsford Swanlow, Winsford Verdin, and Winsford Wharton, the Borough of Crewe and Nantwich wards of Acton, Audlem, Bunbury, Minshull, Peckforton, and Wybunbury, and the City of Chester wards of Barrow, Farndon, Kelsall, Malpas, Tarvin, Tattenhall, Tilston, and Waverton.

Minor boundary changes, primarily due to local authority boundary changes.

However, before the new boundaries came into force for the 2010 election, the districts making up the county of Cheshire were abolished on 1 April 2009, being replaced by four unitary authorities. Consequently, the constituency's boundaries became:

The Cheshire West and Chester wards of: Chester Villages (part), Davenham & Moulton (part), Farndon (part), Gowy (part), Malpas, Tarporley, Tarvin & Kelsall, Tattenhall, Weaver & Cuddington (part), Winsford Over & Verdin (part), Winford Swanlow & Dene, and Winsford Wharton, and the Cheshire East wards of Audlem, Brereton Rural (part), Bunbury, Leighton (part), and Wybunbury.

2019–2024: Following a further local government ward boundary review in 2019, the boundaries were:

The Cheshire West and Chester wards of Christleton & Huntington (part), Davenham, Moulton & Kingsmead (part), Farndon (part), Gowy Rural (part), Malpas, Sandstone (part), Tarporley, Tarvin & Kelsall, Tattenhall, Weaver & Cuddington (part), Winsford Dene, Winsford Gravel, Winsford Over & Verdin (part), Winford Swanlow, and Winsford Wharton, and the Cheshire East wards of Audlem, Brereton Rural (part), Bunbury, Leighton (part), and Wybunbury.

== Political history (current constituency) ==
Since the constituency was re-established in 1983, it had always been held by a Conservative, until September 2019.

Between 1983 and 1999, it was represented by Alastair Goodlad, who resigned upon being appointed the United Kingdom's High Commissioner to Australia. The ensuing by-election was won by Stephen O'Brien, who held the seat until 2015. Antoinette Sandbach was elected in 2015, and re-elected in 2017.

The closest the Labour Party has come to winning the seat was in the 1997 general election, when the Conservative majority was reduced to just 1,185. Eddisbury consists of mainly rural villages and small towns which are favourable to the Conservative party; Labour's only strength is in the constituency's largest town, Winsford, which currently has the seat's only local councillors. Labour fell from second to third place in the 2010 general election—the Conservative candidate held the seat with a majority of over 13,000 and a Liberal Democrat moved into second place. The 2015 election saw Labour move back into second place, and the Conservative majority fell by 1.8%.

In 2019, the sitting MP, Antoinette Sandbach had the whip withdrawn following a mass Conservative rebellion intended to prevent a no-deal Brexit, resulting in the seat becoming Independent before defecting to the Liberal Democrats on 31 October 2019. She stood at the December 2019 general election for the Liberal Democrats, but was beaten into third place, with the Conservative candidate, Edward Timpson, achieving a majority of 34.8% over Labour. Edward Timpson was previously the Conservative MP for Crewe and Nantwich constituency until the 2017 General Election, after which Crewe and Nantwich briefly switched to Labour with Laura Smith until 2019, before switching back to the Conservatives with Kieran Mullan.

== Members of Parliament ==
Election	Member	Party
1885	Henry James Tollemache	Conservative
1906	Arthur Stanley	Liberal
1910	Harry Barnston	Conservative
1929 by-election	R. J. Russell	Liberal
1931	R. J. Russell	National Liberal
1943 by-election	John Loverseed	Common Wealth
1944	John Loverseed	Independent
1945	John Loverseed	Labour
1945	Sir John Barlow	National Liberal
1950	constituency abolished	
1983	Sir Alastair Goodlad	Conservative
1999 by-election	Stephen O'Brien	Conservative
2015	Antoinette Sandbach	Conservative
September 2019	Antoinette Sandbach	Independent
September 2019	Antoinette Sandbach	Liberal Democrats
2019	Edward Timpson	Conservative

== Elections ==
=== Elections in the 2010s ===
General election 2019: Eddisbury
Party	Candidate	Votes	%	±%
Conservative	Edward Timpson	30,095	56.8	▼0.1
Labour	Terry Savage	11,652	22.0	▼11.6
Liberal Democrats	Antoinette Sandbach	9,582	18.1	▲12.6
Green	Louise Jewkes	1,191	2.2	▲0.7
UKIP	Andrea Allen	451	0.9	▼1.3
Majority		18,443	34.8	▲11.5
Turnout		52,971	71.9	▼1.25
Conservative hold		Swing	▲5.8	

General election 2017: Eddisbury
Party	Candidate	Votes	%	±%
Conservative	Antoinette Sandbach	29,192	56.9	▲5.9
Labour	Cathy Reynolds	17,250	33.6	▲10.0
Liberal Democrats	Ian Priestner	2,804	5.5	▼3.6
UKIP	John Bickley	1,109	2.2	▼10.0
Green	Mark Green	785	1.5	▼1.9
Pirate	Morgan Hill	179	0.3	New
Majority		11,942	23.3	▼4.1
Turnout		51,319	73.15	▲4.15
Conservative hold		Swing	▼2.1	

General election 2015: Eddisbury
Party	Candidate	Votes	%	±%
Conservative	Antoinette Sandbach	24,167	51.0	▼0.7
Labour	James Laing	11,193	23.6	▲2.0
UKIP	Rob Millington	5,778	12.2	▲7.9
Liberal Democrats	Ian Priestner	4,289	9.1	▼13.4
Green	Andrew Garman	1,624	3.4	New
CISTA	George Antar	301	0.6	New
Majority		12,974	27.4	▼1.8
Turnout		47,352	69.0	▼0.5
Conservative hold		Swing	▼1.4	

General election 2010: Eddisbury
Party	Candidate	Votes	%	±%
Conservative	Stephen O'Brien	23,472	51.7	▲4.8
Liberal Democrats	Bob Thompson	10,217	22.5	▲4.5
Labour	Pat Merrick	9,794	21.6	▼10.5
UKIP	Charles Dodman	1,931	4.3	▲1.3
Majority		13,255	29.2	▲15.6
Turnout		45,414	69.5	▲2.3
Conservative hold		Swing	▲0.2	

=== Elections in the 2000s ===
General election 2005: Eddisbury
Party	Candidate	Votes	%	±%
Conservative	Stephen O'Brien	21,181	46.4	+0.1
Labour	Mark Green	14,986	32.8	−3.2
Liberal Democrats	Joanne Crotty	8,182	17.9	+2.2
UKIP	Steve Roxborough	1,325	2.9	+0.9
Majority		6,195	13.6	+3.3
Turnout		45,674	63.2	−1.0
Conservative hold		Swing	+1.6	

General election 2001: Eddisbury
Party	Candidate	Votes	%	±%
Conservative	Stephen O'Brien	20,556	46.3	+3.8
Labour	George Eyres	15,988	36.0	−4.1
Liberal Democrats	Paul Roberts	6,975	15.7	+2.5
UKIP	David Carson	868	2.0	New
Majority		4,568	10.3	+5.7
Turnout		44,387	64.2	−11.6
Conservative hold		Swing		

=== Elections in the 1990s ===
1999 Eddisbury by-election
Party	Candidate	Votes	%	±%
Conservative	Stephen O'Brien	15,465	44.8	+2.3
Labour	Margaret R. Hanson	13,859	40.2	+0.1
Liberal Democrats	Paul D. Roberts	4,757	13.8	+0.6
Monster Raving Loony	Alan Hope	238	0.7	New
Independent	Robert J. Everest	98	0.3	New
Natural Law	Dinah Grice	80	0.2	New
Majority		1,606	4.6	+2.2
Turnout		34,497	51.4	−24.4
Conservative hold		Swing		

General election 1997: Eddisbury
Party	Candidate	Votes	%	±%
Conservative	Alastair Goodlad	21,027	42.5	−8.5
Labour	Margaret R. Hanson	19,842	40.1	+9.6
Liberal Democrats	David Reaper	6,540	13.2	−3.8
Referendum	Norine D. Napier	2,041	4.2	New
Majority		1,185	2.4	−18.1
Turnout		49,450	75.8	−6.8
Conservative hold		Swing	−9.1	

General election 1992: Eddisbury
Party	Candidate	Votes	%	±%
Conservative	Alastair Goodlad	31,625	51.0	−0.1
Labour	Norma M. Edwards	18,928	30.5	+7.0
Liberal Democrats	Derrick W. Lyon	10,543	17.0	−6.7
Green	Andrew Basden	783	1.3	−0.4
Natural Law	Nigel P.J. Pollard	107	0.2	New
Majority		12,697	20.5	−6.9
Turnout		61,986	82.6	+4.6
Conservative hold		Swing	−3.5	

=== Elections in the 1980s ===
General election 1987: Eddisbury
Party	Candidate	Votes	%	±%
Conservative	Alastair Goodlad	29,474	51.1	−2.4
Liberal	Roderick Fletcher	13,639	23.7	−1.8
Labour	Catriona Grigg	13,574	23.5	+2.5
Green	Andrew Basden	976	1.7	New
Majority		15,835	27.4	−0.6
Turnout		57,663	78.0	+3.2
Conservative hold		Swing	−0.3	

General election 1983: Eddisbury
Party	Candidate	Votes	%	±%
Conservative	Alastair Goodlad	28,407	53.5	
Liberal	Roderick Fletcher	13,561	25.5	
Labour	David Hanson	11,169	21.0	
Majority		14,846	28.0	
Turnout		53,137	74.8	
Conservative win (new seat)				

== Election results 1885–1945 ==
=== Elections in the 1940s ===
General election 1945: Eddisbury
Party	Candidate	Votes	%	±%
National Liberal	John Barlow	15,294	57.7	N/A
Labour	John Loverseed	7,392	27.9	New
Liberal	Dunstan Curtis	3,808	14.4	New
Majority		7,902	29.8	N/A
Turnout		26,494	75.2	N/A
National Liberal hold		Swing	N/A	

1943 Eddisbury by-election
Party	Candidate	Votes	%	±%
Common Wealth	John Loverseed	8,023	43.7	New
National Liberal	Thomas Peacock	7,537	41.0	N/A
Independent Liberal	Harold Heathcote Williams	2,803	15.3	New
Majority		486	2.7	N/A
Turnout		18,363	56.1	N/A
Common Wealth gain from National Liberal				

General Election 1939–40:

Another general election was required to take place before the end of 1940. The political parties had been making preparations for an election to take place from 1939 and by the end of this year, the following candidates had been selected;

- Liberal National: R. J. Russell
- Liberal: William Gretton Ward

=== Elections in the 1930s ===
General election 1935: Eddisbury
Party	Candidate	Votes	%	±%
National Liberal	R. J. Russell	Unopposed		
National Liberal hold				

General election 1931: Eddisbury
Party	Candidate	Votes	%	±%
National Liberal	R. J. Russell	Unopposed		
National Liberal hold				

=== Elections in the 1920s ===
General election 1929: Eddisbury
Party	Candidate	Votes	%	±%
Liberal	R. J. Russell	13,688	51.6	+5.7
Unionist	Roderick George Fenwick-Palmer	12,862	48.4	−5.7
Majority		826	3.2	N/A
Turnout		26,550	86.8	−0.1
Registered electors		30,593		
Liberal hold		Swing	+5.7	

1929 Eddisbury by-election
Party	Candidate	Votes	%	±%
Liberal	R. J. Russell	10,223	53.4	+7.5
Unionist	Roderick George Fenwick-Palmer	8,931	46.6	−7.5
Majority		1,292	6.8	N/A
Turnout		19,154	80.6	−6.3
Registered electors		23,760		
Liberal gain from Unionist		Swing	+7.5	

General election 1924: Eddisbury
Party	Candidate	Votes	%	±%
Unionist	Harry Barnston	11,006	54.1	+3.5
Liberal	R. J. Russell	9,337	45.9	−3.5
Majority		1,669	8.2	+7.0
Turnout		20,343	86.9	+10.5
Registered electors		23,409		
Unionist hold		Swing	+3.5	

General election 1923: Eddisbury
Party	Candidate	Votes	%	±%
Unionist	Harry Barnston	8,716	50.6	N/A
Liberal	R. J. Russell	8,520	49.4	N/A
Majority		196	1.2	N/A
Turnout		17,236	76.4	N/A
Registered electors		22,547		
Unionist hold				

General election 1922: Eddisbury
Party	Candidate	Votes	%	±%
Unionist	Harry Barnston	Unopposed		
Unionist hold				

By-election, 1921: Eddisbury
Party		Candidate	Votes	%	±%
C	Unionist	Harry Barnston	Unopposed		
	Unionist hold				
C indicates candidate endorsed by the coalition government.

=== Elections in the 1910s ===
General election 1918: Eddisbury
Party		Candidate	Votes	%	±%
C	Unionist	Harry Barnston	Unopposed		
	Unionist hold				
C indicates candidate endorsed by the coalition government.

General Election 1914–15: Another General Election was required to take place before the end of 1915. The political parties had been making preparations for an election to take place and by July 1914, the following candidates had been selected;

- Unionist: Harry Barnston
- Liberal: Hayward

General election December 1910: Eddisbury
Party	Candidate	Votes	%	±%
Conservative	Harry Barnston	5,312	51.4	−1.8
Liberal	Arthur Stanley	5,023	48.6	+1.8
Majority		289	2.8	−3.6
Turnout		10,335	90.0	−2.6
Registered electors		11,488		
Conservative hold		Swing	−1.8	

General election January 1910: Eddisbury
Party	Candidate	Votes	%	±%
Conservative	Harry Barnston	5,664	53.2	+9.1
Liberal	Arthur Stanley	4,976	46.8	−9.1
Majority		688	6.4	N/A
Turnout		10,640	92.6	+6.1
Registered electors		11,488		
Conservative gain from Liberal		Swing	+9.1	

=== Elections in the 1900s ===
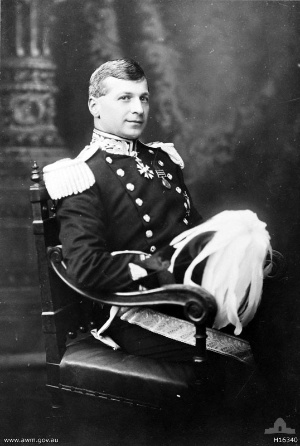
Stanley

Cotton-Jodrell

General election 1906: Eddisbury
Party	Candidate	Votes	%	±%
Liberal	Arthur Stanley	5,315	55.9	New
Conservative	Edward Cotton-Jodrell	4,192	44.1	N/A
Majority		1,123	11.8	N/A
Turnout		9,507	86.5	N/A
Registered electors		10,988		
Liberal gain from Conservative				

General election 1900: Eddisbury
Party	Candidate	Votes	%	±%
Conservative	Henry James Tollemache	Unopposed		
Conservative hold				

=== Elections in the 1890s ===
General election 1895: Eddisbury
Party	Candidate	Votes	%	±%
Conservative	Henry James Tollemache	5,176	60.6	+7.5
Liberal	Roger Bate	3,371	39.4	−7.5
Majority		1,805	21.2	+15.0
Turnout		8,547	83.3	−0.9
Registered electors		10,262		
Conservative hold		Swing	+7.5	

General election 1892: Eddisbury
Party	Candidate	Votes	%	±%
Conservative	Henry James Tollemache	4,578	53.1	−1.1
Liberal	James Tomkinson	4,042	46.9	+1.1
Majority		536	6.2	−2.2
Turnout		8,620	84.2	+7.2
Registered electors		10,232		
Conservative hold		Swing	−1.1	

=== Elections in the 1880s ===
Tomkinson

General election 1886: Eddisbury
Party	Candidate	Votes	%	±%
Conservative	Henry James Tollemache	4,357	54.2	+3.5
Liberal	James Tomkinson	3,678	45.8	−3.5
Majority		679	8.4	+7.0
Turnout		8,035	77.0	−4.0
Registered electors		10,436		
Conservative hold		Swing	+3.5	

Tollemache

General election 1885: Eddisbury
Party	Candidate	Votes	%	±%
Conservative	Henry James Tollemache	4,285	50.7	
Liberal	Lawrence Irwell	4,164	49.3	
Majority		121	1.4	
Turnout		8,449	81.0	
Registered electors		10,436		
Conservative win (new seat)				

== See also ==
- List of parliamentary constituencies in Cheshire
- History of parliamentary constituencies and boundaries in Cheshire
