= 1999 Eddisbury by-election =

UK parliamentary by-election

- 22 July 1999
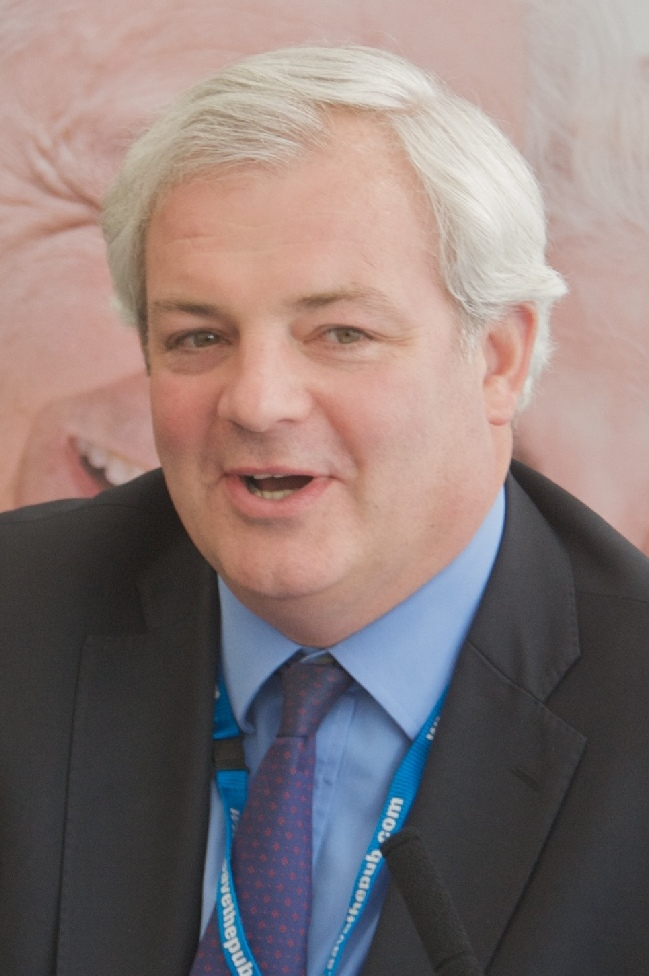
	First party	Second party	Third party
Candidate	Stephen O'Brien	Margaret Hanson	Paul Roberts
Party	Conservative	Labour	Liberal Democrats
Popular vote	15,465	13,859	4,757
Percentage	44.8%	40.2%	13.8%
Swing	▲2.3pp	▲0.1pp	▲0.6pp
MP before election
Alastair Goodlad
Conservative
Elected MP
Stephen O'Brien
Conservative

A by-election for the United Kingdom parliamentary constituency of Eddisbury was held on 22 July 1999, following resignation of incumbent Conservative Party Member of Parliament (MP) Alastair Goodlad upon his appointment as High Commissioner to the Commonwealth of Australia. Stephen O'Brien won the by-election, holding the seat for the Conservatives.

On 25 May 1999, the Foreign and Commonwealth Office announced the appointment of Goodlad as High Commissioner to the Commonwealth of Australia, creating a vacancy in the seat which he had retained as the Conservative candidate in the 1997 general election. Goodlad resigned from the House of Commons by accepting the office of Steward and Bailiff of the Three Hundreds of Chiltern on 28 June 1999 to formally vacate his seat.

The 1999 British cabinet reshuffle was delayed by a week in anticipation of a strong Labour performance in the by-election.

== Candidates ==
The Conservatives selected Stephen O'Brien, a former SDP member who lived in Chichester, to defend the seat. Labour nominated Margaret Hanson, wife of David Hanson (Labour MP for Delyn), who had also fought the seat at the 1997 election. Labour had been only just over 1,000 votes behind the Conservatives in 1997 and ran an energetic campaign, raising the issue of fox hunting which she pledged to ban. Prime Minister Tony Blair went to the constituency to campaign for her, an unusual move as it is convention for incumbent Prime Ministers not to visit byelection campaigns.

Polling day was 22 July and the result was a virtual carbon copy of that in 1997; each party had fought to a standstill.

== Opinion polling ==
Date(s) conducted	Pollster	Client	Sample size	Con	Lab	Lib Dem	Others	Lead
22 Jul 1999	1999 by-election		–	44.8%	40.2%	13.8%	1.2%	4.6%
13 Jul 1999	Ipsos	N/A	500	38%	42%	17%	3%	4%
1 May 1997	1997 general election		–	42.5%	40.1%	13.2%	4.2%	2.4%

== Result ==
Eddisbury by-election, 1999
Party	Candidate	Votes	%	±%
Conservative	Stephen O'Brien	15,465	44.8	+2.3
Labour	Margaret Hanson	13,859	40.2	+0.1
Liberal Democrats	Paul Roberts	4,757	13.8	+0.6
Monster Raving Loony	Alan Hope	238	0.7	New
Independent	Roger Everest	98	0.3	New
Natural Law	Dinah Grice	80	0.2	New
Majority		1,606	4.6	+2.2
Turnout		34,497	51.4	−24.4
Conservative hold		Swing		

== Previous election ==
General election 1997: Eddisbury
Party	Candidate	Votes	%	±%
Conservative	Alastair Goodlad	21,027	42.5	
Labour	Margaret Hanson	19,842	40.1	
Liberal Democrats	David Reaper	6,540	13.2	
Referendum	Norine Napier	2,041	4.2	
Majority		1,185	2.4	
Turnout		49,450	75.8	
Conservative hold		Swing		

== See also ==
- Eddisbury constituency
- Lists of United Kingdom by-elections
