= John Loverseed =

John Eric Loverseed MP AFC
- Born: 4 December 1910; Downham, Norfolk, England
- Died: 24 November 1962 (aged 51); Biggleswade, Bedfordshire, England
- Relatives: Father – John Frederick Loverseed; Son – Raymond Eric William Loverseed
- Military career
- Allegiance: United Kingdom
- Branch: Royal Air Force; Republican Spanish Air Force
- Service years: RAF 1929–1935; RSAF 1937–1938; RAF 1939–1943
- Rank: Flying Officer; Warrant Officer
- Service number: 907964
- Units: Republican Spanish Air Force; No. 1 Anti-Aircraft Co-operation Unit; 501 Squadron
- Conflicts: Spanish Civil War World War II; Battle of France; Battle of Britain
- Awards: Air Force Cross

Member of Parliament for Eddisbury
- In office 7 April 1943 – 5 July 1945
- Preceded by: Richard Russell
- Succeeded by: John Barlow
- Majority: 486

John Eric Loverseed AFC (4 December 1910 – 24 November 1962) was a pilot who flew with the Royal Air Force in 1930s, with Republican forces in the Spanish Civil War in 1937/38, and with the RAF again during the Battle of Britain. In 1943 he was elected as a wartime MP for the Common Wealth Party. He was later a co-founder of the pacifist Fellowship Party.

== Early and private life ==
Loverseed was born in Downham, Norfolk, the son of Liberal politician and former MP for Sudbury, John Frederick Loverseed (1881–1928), and his wife Catherine Annie (Kitty) (née Thurman).

Loverseed was educated at Sudbury Grammar School. He joined the RAF on a short service commission in 1929, and was commissioned as a probationary Pilot Officer, was confirmed in the rank of Pilot Officer in April 1930, and promoted to Flying Officer in October 1930. He served in the Middle East, and was posted to Heliopolis in March 1931. His son, Bill, was born in Egypt in 1932. He left the RAF and was transferred to the RAF officer reserve in July 1935.

He served as a pilot in the Spanish Republican Air Force during the Spanish Civil War from December 1936 to February 1937, and was injured in January 1937. He was removed from the RAF reserve in December 1937.

He married five times, first to Pamela; then to Ethel Maud Hill, having a son and a daughter; then to Gladys Male, having two daughters and a son; then to Georgina June Mary Matthews having one son, John Frederick, born 10 January 1956; and finally, two months before his death, on 9 September 1962, to Joan Buckland.

== Second World War ==
He rejoined the RAF in November 1939, as a non-commissioned officer. After a refresher flying course, he was posted to No. 1 Anti-Aircraft Co-operation Unit (AACU) on 20 May 1940. The AACU towed targets for anti-aircraft practice.

The following day, he was posted 501 Squadron, which had been deployed to airfields in France as part of the Advanced Air Striking Force (AASF) providing air support for the British Expeditionary Force. He was injured when his Hawker Hurricane crash-landed on 31 May 1940, and was evacuated to a hospital in England. By the time he recovered and returned to his unit on 19 July 1940, 501 Squadron had also returned to England following the Fall of France.

He took part in six operational sorties in the Battle of Britain before being posted back to 1 AACU on 19 August 1940. He had been promoted to the rank of Warrant Officer by the time he was awarded the Air Force Cross on 1 January 1943.

== Political career ==
He stood as the Common Wealth Party candidate for Eddisbury in Cheshire in the by-election in April 1943 caused by the death of sitting National Liberal MP Richard John Russell. The Common Wealth Party had been founded in July 1942 by the alliance of two left-wing groups, the 1941 Committee and the neo-Christian Forward March movement, standing on a radical "libertarian socialist" platform. It opposed the electoral pact established by the Conservative, Labour, and Liberal Parties in the national wartime coalition government, who agreed that MPs filling casual parliamentary vacancies should be returned unopposed, and was one of several small parties who put up opposing candidates in wartime by-elections.

Russell had won the Eddisbury seat as a Liberal in 1929, and retained it as a National Liberal since 1931. Taking advantage of the fact that the National Liberal candidate, Thomas Peacock, was thought to have Conservative leanings, Loverseed downplayed his party's commitment to common ownership, and emphasised its liberal policies.

Peacock campaigned against Loverseed using the slogan "Hitler is watching Eddisbury". Other potential candidates withdrew leaving one other candidate – H Heathcote Williams, an Independent Liberal. Loverseed unexpectedly won the by-election with 8,023 votes, a majority of 486, and was discharged from the RAF at his own request to serve in Parliament. He was the first Common Wealth Party candidate to win an election, and joined its only other MP, Sir Richard Acland. Two others followed at by-elections in 1944 – Hugh Lawson in Skipton and Ernest Millington in Chelmsford. Olaf Stapledon described Loverseed's victory as offering "a fresh inspiration in political life at a time when it was greatly needed."

Loverseed left the Common Wealth Party in November 1944, becoming an independent, and then joining the Labour Party in May 1945. He stood in Eddisbury again at the 1945 general election, this time polling less than half the votes of National Liberal candidate, Sir John Barlow, 2nd Baronet, who took the seat with 15,294 votes and a majority of 7,902. He was expelled from the Labour Party in July 1945.

In May 1955 he stood against Herbert Morrison unsuccessfully for South Lewisham as an Independent Pacifist.

In June 1955, he was a co-founder of the pacifist Fellowship Party, which claimed to be the oldest environmentalist party in Britain; it dissolved in 2007.

== Son ==
His son, Raymond Eric William Loverseed was born on an RAF base in Egypt in 1932. Bill joined the RAF in 1952, and flew with the Red Arrows in their first year, 1965, and also in 1970. He took command of the Red Arrows in 1971 after the previous leader, Dennis Hazell, broke his leg after ejecting due to an engine failure in practice in November 1970. Four Red Arrows' pilots were killed in an accident at RAF Kemble in January 1971, when two planes carrying two men each collided in mid-air. Bill Loverseed was promoted to Squadron Leader in July 1971, but resigned his commission in May 1972. He married four times. He flew a Buffalo transport plane that crash-landed at the Farnborough Air Show in 1984, and a Piper Cherokee aircraft that suffered severe icing and crashed in Newfoundland in 1987. He died in 1998, on a Dash 7 that he was piloting on a test flight over Devon.

Parliament of the United Kingdom
Preceded by Richard John Russell	Member of Parliament for Eddisbury; 1943 – 1945	Succeeded by Sir John Barlow
