= 1999 British cabinet reshuffle =

Government ministry changes

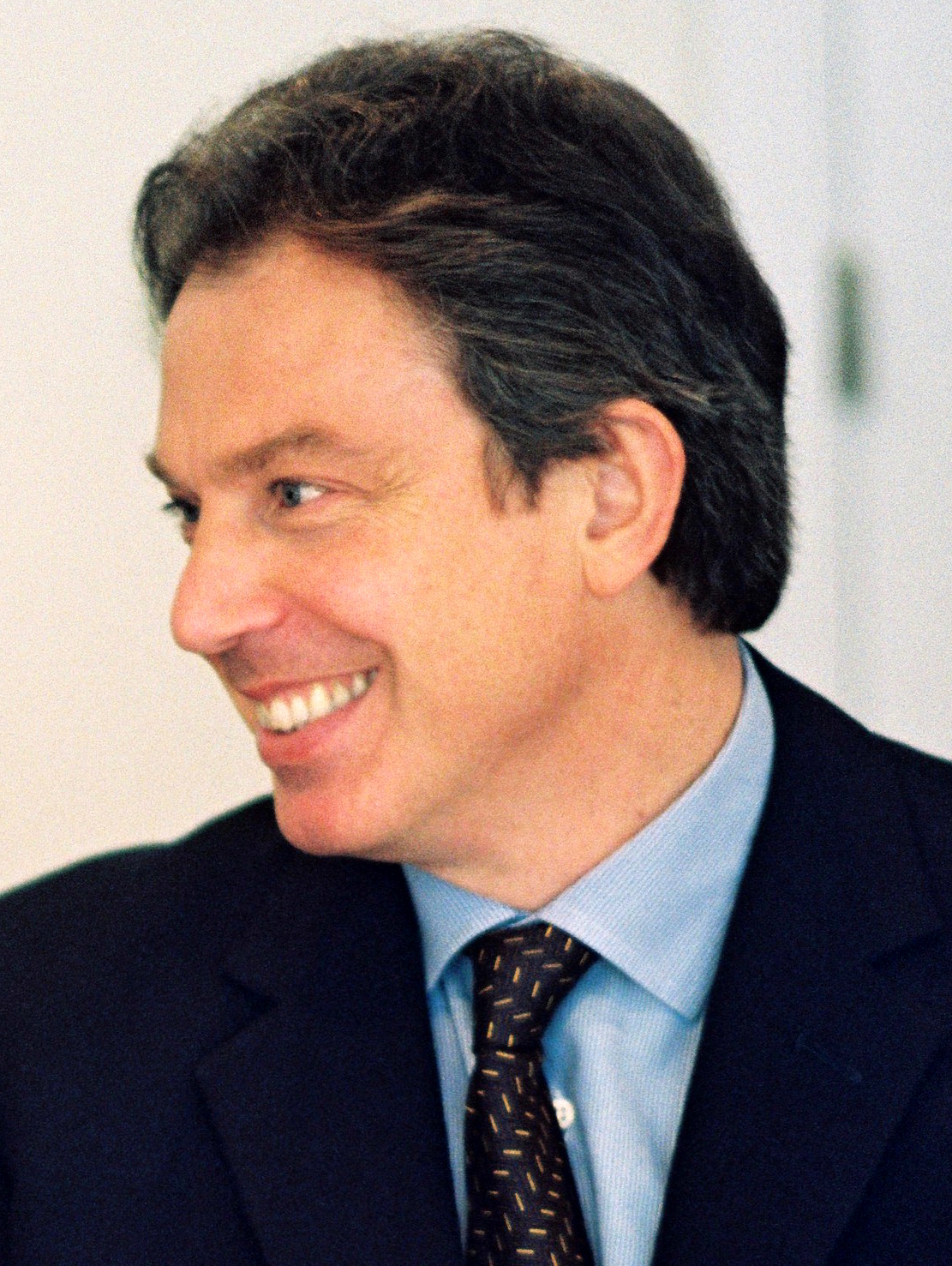
Tony Blair

On 27 July 1999, British Prime Minister Tony Blair held his first major cabinet reshuffle of his government.

== Background ==
It was considered that Health secretary Frank Dobson would stand in the 2000 London mayoral election against Labour-turned-Independent Ken Livingstone. But he denied accusations of him being moved out of government.

Mo Mowlam expected to be replaced as Secretary of State for Northern Ireland by Peter Mandelson but this did not happen until October 1999. The reshuffle was anticipated as being the cull of Old Labour and the promotion of Blairites from the 1997 general election. It was reported that Alastair Campbell, Blair's Press Secretary, had influence over changes at Cabinet level.

The reshuffle was delayed by a week in anticipation of a strong Labour performance in the 1999 Eddisbury by-election.

== Cabinet-level changes ==
- Margaret Beckett becomes Lord President of the Council and Leader of the House of Commons
- The Baroness Jay of Paddington becomes Lord Keeper of the Privy Seal, Leader of the House of Lords and Minister for Women
- Stephen Byers becomes Chief Secretary to the Treasury
- Ann Taylor becomes Chief Whip, which became a cabinet position
- Jack Cunningham becomes Cabinet Office Minister and Chancellor of the Duchy of Lancaster
- Nick Brown becomes Minister of Agriculture, Fisheries and Food
- Alistair Darling becomes Secretary of State for Social Security
- Paul Murphy promoted to Secretary of State for Wales from Minister of State for Northern Ireland
- Peter Mandelson moves from being Minister Without Portfolio to being Trade and Industry Secretary
- John Reid becomes Transport Minister, which is no longer a cabinet position (although Reid will continue attending cabinet meetings)
- David Simon, Baron Simon of Highbury left as the trade minister responsible for preparing Britain joining the euro.

Ivor Richard, Harriet Harman, David Clark and Gavin Strang left the cabinet

The President of the Board of Trade ceased to be a title used by the Trade Secretary

== Junior ministerial changes ==
Colour key
- Promoted (Note: According to the ministerial pay scale: Minister of State > Parliamentary Under-Secretary of State > Parliamentary Private Secretary)
- Left the government

Minister	Position before reshuffle	Position after reshuffle
Peter Kilfoyle	Minister of State for the Cabinet Office; Minister of State at the Office of Public Service	Parliamentary Under-Secretary of State for Defence
Ian McCartney	Minister of State for Competitiveness	Minister of State for the Cabinet Office; Minister of State at the Office of Public Service
Barbara Roche	Financial Secretary to the Treasury	Minister of State for Asylum and Immigration
Stephen Timms	Minister of State for Pensions	Financial Secretary to the Treasury
Tony Lloyd	Minister of State for Foreign Affairs	Backbench MP
John Battle	Minister of State for Trade and Industry	Minister of State for Foreign Affairs
Brian Wilson	Minister of State for Scotland	Minister of State for Trade and Industry
Joyce Quin	Minister of State for Europe	Minister of State for Agriculture, Fisheries and Food
Geoff Hoon	Minister of State for Africa	Minister of State for Europe
Gareth Williams	Minister of State for Prisons	Attorney General for England and Wales; Attorney General for Northern Ireland
Charles Clarke	Parliamentary Under Secretary of State for Education and Employment	Minister of State for Prisons
Kate Hoey	Parliamentary Under-Secretary of State for Home Affairs	Minister for Sport
Tony Banks	Minister for Sport	Backbench MP
Steve Bassam	Backbench peer	Parliamentary Under-Secretary of State for Home Affairs
George Howarth	Parliamentary Under Secretary of State for Prisons, Drugs & Elections	Parliamentary Under-Secretary of State for Northern Ireland
Helen Liddell	Minister of State for Transport	Minister of State for Trade and Industry
Gus Macdonald	Parliamentary Under-Secretary of State for Scotland	Minister of State for Transport
Hilary Armstrong	Minister of State for Housing and Planning	
Nick Raynsford	Minister for London	Minister of State for Housing and Planning; Minister of State for the Regions
Richard Caborn	Minister of State for the Regions	Minister of State for Trade
Keith Hill	Assistant Whip	Minister for London; Parliamentary Under-Secretary of State for Transport
Alan Meale	Parliamentary Under Secretary of State for Energy, Environment & the Regions	Backbench MP
Beverley Hughes	Backbench MP	Parliamentary Under Secretary of State at the Department of Environment, Transport and the Regions
Jeff Rooker	Minister of State for Agriculture, Fisheries and Food	Minister of State for Pensions
Bernard Donoughue	Parliamentary Under Secretary of State for Farming and the Food Industry	Backbench MP
Helene Hayman	Parliamentary Under-Secretary of State for Health	Parliamentary Under Secretary of State for Farming and the Food Industry
Doug Henderson	Minister of State for the Armed Forces	
John Spellar	Parliamentary Under-Secretary of State for Defence	Minister of State for the Armed Forces
John Gilbert	Minister of State for Defence Procurement	Backbench MP
Elizabeth Symons	Parliamentary Under-Secretary of State for Foreign and Commonwealth Affairs	Minister of State for Defence Procurement
George Mudie	Parliamentary Under-Secretary of State for Education and Employment	Backbench MP
Jacqui Smith	Backbench MP	Parliamentary Under-Secretary of State for Education and Employment
Michael Wills	Backbench MP	Parliamentary Under Secretary of State for Education and Employment
Malcolm Wicks	Backbench MP	Minister for Lifelong Learning in the Department for Education and Employment
Gisela Stuart	Backbench MP	Parliamentary Under-Secretary of State for Health
Alan Johnson	Backbench MP	Parliamentary Under Secretary of State for Small Firms, Trade & Industry
Keith Vaz	Parliamentary Under Secretary of State to the Lord Chancellors Department	Minister for Europe, Foreign and Commonwealth Affairs
David Lock	Backbench MP	Parliamentary Under Secretary of State at the Lord Chancellors Department
John Sewel	Parliamentary Under-Secretary of State for Scotland	Backbench MP
Calum MacDonald	Parliamentary Under-Secretary of State for Scotland	Backbench MP
Peter Hain	Parliamentary Under-Secretary of State for Wales	Minister of State for Africa, the Middle East and South Asia
Jon Owen Jones	Parliamentary Under-Secretary of State for Wales	
David Hanson	Assistant Whip	Parliamentary Under-Secretary of State for Wales
Gerry Sutcliffe	Backbench MP	Assistant Whip
Philip Hunt	Lord-in-waiting	Parliamentary Under-Secretary of State at the Department of Health
Willy Bach	Backbench MP (given peerage on day of reshuffle)	Lord-in-waiting

== Reception ==
The reshuffle was described as "problematic". Journalist Anne Perkins wrote in favour of scrapping cabinet reshuffles.
