= Glamour Boys (politicians) =

British politicians

Glamour Boys were a group of British Members of Parliament in the 1930s who were among the earliest to warn about Hitler and the dangers of Appeasement of Nazi Germany. Some, but not all, of this group were homosexual. It is not clear the name derived from sexuality or the relative youth of this group. For example Anthony Eden was a leading member, who was young, well dressed, but not gay.

== History ==
=== Name ===
Neville Chamberlain derisively branded the group "glamour boys", presumably an insinuation of their sexuality in a Britain in which homosexual practice was illegal.

=== Members ===
This was a group of like-minded MPs, not a formal organization; hence, membership is fluid. Those listed below all lost their lives serving in the ensuing Second World War:

- Robert Bernays, MP for Bristol North (1931–1945) KIA
- Ronald Cartland, MP for Birmingham King's Norton (1935–1940) KIA
- Victor Cazalet, MP for Chippenham (1924–1942) KIA
- John Macnamara, MP for Chelmsford (1935–1944) KIA
- Anthony Muirhead, MP for Wells (1929–1939) suicide

Others associated with the group include Robert Boothby, Harold Nicolson, Harry Crookshank, Ronald Tree, and Jim Thomas.

=== Apprehensions about Hitler ===
In the late 1920s and early 1930s, Berlin’s sexual liberation was very inviting for British homosexuals, who lived under fear of persecution back home. Living their lives with practised subterfuge in Britain, gays felt free to be themselves in Berlin.

Among these regular visitors to Germany were these British MPs. The treatment of Jews and the assassination of homosexuals in Hitler’s purge of political opponents in the Night of the Long Knives in 1934 gave them insights that many in Britain were keen on ignoring. The group spoke out against appeasement, were scathingly critical of the Munich Agreement, and became ardent campaigners for rearmament. Many of them even enlisted, risking exposure and imprisonment.

Without these parliamentary rebels sounding the alarm as early as 1932 and speaking and voting against Chamberlain’s policy of appeasement, says author Chris Bryant, Britain “would never have gone to war with Hitler, Churchill would never have become prime minister and Nazism would never have been defeated”.

By the end of the decade, Berlin’s sexual liberation was over and gay men were sent to concentration camps.

=== Harassment ===
Neville Chamberlain had them followed, harassed, spied on and derided in the press. They were attacked as warmongers, threatened with deselection and had their phones tapped.

== Media ==
Homosexuality remained illegal in England and Wales until 1967; by definition, gay men’s private lives from the 1930s were not much documented. It has been argued that these men were written out of history for decades because of their sexuality.

They are the subjects of Welsh Labour Party politician Chris Bryant's book The Glamour Boys: The Secret Story of the Rebels who Fought for Britain to Defeat Hitler, published by Bloomsbury Publishing in 2020. The book was one of The Guardian's top books of autumn 2020.

Bryant said, "Churchill gets all the credit all the time because that's what he wrote. He was opposed to the policy of appeasement, and all the rest of it, but what nobody, I guess, would know is that half the time when Churchill and [Anthony] Eden were plotting with the rebels, roughly half the men in the room were 'queer'."
