= Ealing South =

Parliamentary constituency in the United Kingdom, 1950–1974

- Former borough constituency for the House of Commons

1950–February 1974
- Seats: one
- Created from: Ealing East
- Replaced by: Acton (Bulk); Ealing North (Part); Southall (Part)

Ealing South was a constituency covering the same part of the Municipal Borough of Ealing in Middlesex as its short-lived forerunner Ealing East. It returned one member (MP) to the House of Commons of the UK Parliament. It was won by two Conservatives consecutively with majorities ranging from 13.6% to 30.5%, was first contested in the general election in 1950 and was replaced before that of February 1974.

== History ==
The constituency was created for the 1950 general election, and abolished for the February 1974 general election. In a repeat of the outcome of its direct forerunner Ealing East and its larger precursor in turn, Ealing created in 1885, it was won by the Conservative standing. The runner-up at each election was the Labour candidate, as with its predecessors since 1924 inclusive.

== Boundaries ==
This was a seat covering the same parts of the Municipal Borough of Ealing in Middlesex as its short-lived forerunner Ealing East.

Map that gives each named seat and any constant electoral success for national (Westminster) elections for Middlesex, 1955 to 1974.

The seat was: the southeast portion of the dark-shaded local government area abolished as a council in 1965.

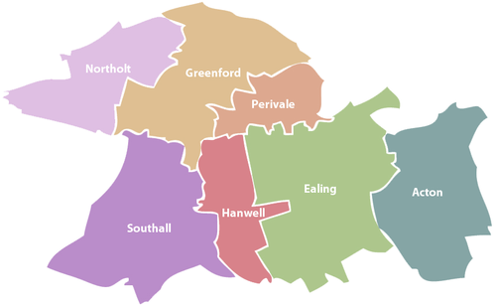
The seat emulates the Ealing district or locality of the larger London Borough of Ealing (larger as it took in Acton and Southall Boroughs), but omitted the northern Hanger Hill ward of Ealing as it then stood, see Ealing North.

Throughout: the zone was fixed as the Ealing M.B., Middlesex six wards: Castlebar, Drayton, Grange Grosvenor, Lammas, Manor, and Mount Park. As to local government body from 1965 its components closely approximated to the south-central wards of the combination council, a replacement of three boroughs, the London Borough of Ealing. These were named Central, Cleveland, Northfields and Walpole.

== Members of Parliament ==
Election	Member	Party	Notes
1950	Angus Maude	Conservative	Resigned April 1958
1958 by-election	Brian Batsford	Conservative	
Feb 1974	constituency abolished: see Acton, Ealing North and Southall		

== Elections ==
For 1945 see Ealing East

=== Elections in the 1950s ===
General election 1950: Ealing South
Party	Candidate	Votes	%
Conservative	Angus Maude	28,299	56.7
Labour	J. Neary	17,097	34.2
Liberal	Betty Corn	4,555	9.1
Majority		11,202	22.4
Turnout		49,951	84.7
Registered electors		58,944	
Conservative win (new seat)			

General election 1951: Ealing South
Party	Candidate	Votes	%	±%
Conservative	Angus Maude	30,261	62.4	+5.8
Labour	David Allen	18,204	37.6	+3.3
Majority		12,057	24.9	+2.5
Turnout		48,465	82.2	–2.5
Registered electors		58,954		
Conservative hold		Swing	+1.2	

General election 1955: Ealing South
Party	Candidate	Votes	%	±%
Conservative	Angus Maude	25,992	59.6	–2.9
Labour	David Allen	13,462	30.9	–6.7
Liberal	David Evans	4,182	9.6	New
Majority		12,530	28.7	+3.8
Turnout		43,636	77.9	–4.4
Registered electors		56,046		
Conservative hold		Swing	+1.9	

By-election, 1958: Ealing South
Party	Candidate	Votes	%	±%
Conservative	Brian Batsford	17,417	50.3	–9.3
Labour	Hugh Garside	11,258	32.5	+1.7
Liberal	Philip Skelsey	5,956	17.2	+7.6
Majority		6,159	17.8	–10.9
Turnout		34,631	64.5	–13.3
Registered electors		53,667		
Conservative hold		Swing	–5.5	

General election 1959: Ealing South
Party	Candidate	Votes	%	±%
Conservative	Brian Batsford	24,761	59.5	–0.1
Labour	Hugh Garside	12,039	28.9	–1.9
Liberal	Jeremy Mostyn	4,842	11.6	+2.0
Majority		12,722	30.6	+1.8
Turnout		41,642	78.1	+0.3
Registered electors		53,296		
Conservative hold		Swing	+0.9	

=== Elections in the 1960s ===
General election 1964: Ealing South
Party	Candidate	Votes	%	±%
Conservative	Brian Batsford	22,121	61.1	+1.6
Labour	Jack Jaffé	14,104	38.9	+10.0
Majority		8,017	22.1	–8.4
Turnout		36,225	70.0	–8.1
Registered electors		51,714		
Conservative hold		Swing	–4.2	

General election 1966: Ealing South
Party	Candidate	Votes	%	±%
Conservative	Brian Batsford	18,968	50.8	–10.2
Labour	Roderick MacFarquhar	13,885	37.2	–1.7
Liberal	Barwys Martin-Kaye	4,473	12.0	New
Majority		5,083	13.6	–8.5
Turnout		37,326	72.8	+2.7
Registered electors		51,283		
Conservative hold		Swing	–4.3	

=== Elections in the 1970s ===
General election 1970: Ealing South
Party	Candidate	Votes	%	±%
Conservative	Brian Batsford	19,326	55.0	+4.2
Labour	Cyril Rofe	12,042	34.3	–2.9
Liberal	Graham Smith	3,784	10.8	–1.2
Majority		7,284	20.7	+7.1
Turnout		35,152	65.4	–7.4
Registered electors		53,779		
Conservative hold		Swing	+3.6	
