= 1941 Committee =

Historic political grouping

The 1941 Committee was a group of British politicians, writers and other people of influence who got together in 1940. Its members comprised liberals, and those further left, who were not generally involved with a political party. Its immediate purpose was to press for more efficient production in order to enhance the war effort. This swiftly developed into discussion of the methods and mores by which the United Kingdom would be governed after World War II. The members met at the home of Edward Hulton, the publisher of Picture Post.

== Members ==
The committee's members included:

- Richard Acland
- David Astor
- Thomas Balogh
- Vernon Bartlett
- Violet Bonham Carter
- Tom Driberg
- Michael Foot
- Raymond Gauntlett, Secretary
- Victor Gollancz
- Eva Hubback
- Edward Hulton
- Julian Huxley
- Margaret Storm Jameson
- Douglas Jay
- David Low
- Kingsley Martin
- Christopher Mayhew
- J. B. Priestley, chairman
- Ritchie Calder
- Peter Thorneycroft
- Richard Titmuss
- H. G. Wells
- Kitty Wintringham
- Tom Wintringham
- Konni Zilliacus

== The Nine-Point Plan ==
In May 1942 the committee published a Nine Point Plan on which it had agreed, calling for works councils and the publication of post-war plans for the provision of full and free education, employment and a civilized standard of living for everyone. This plan was the basis for the successful election campaign of Tom Driberg as an independent in the Maldon by-election. Shortly after, Priestley and most of the moderate members left, and under the guidance of Richard Acland the committee merged with his organisation 'Forward March' to create the Common Wealth Party in July 1942.

Committee members were responsible for the publication of two anonymous best-selling books: Guilty Men by Cato (Michael Foot, Frank Owen, and Peter Howard) and Your M.P. by Gracchus (Wintringham), both published by Gollancz, which exposed pro-fascist sympathies amongst Conservative politicians.
