= Alastair Goodlad =

British Conservative politician (born 1943)

The Right Honourable The Lord Goodlad KCMG PC
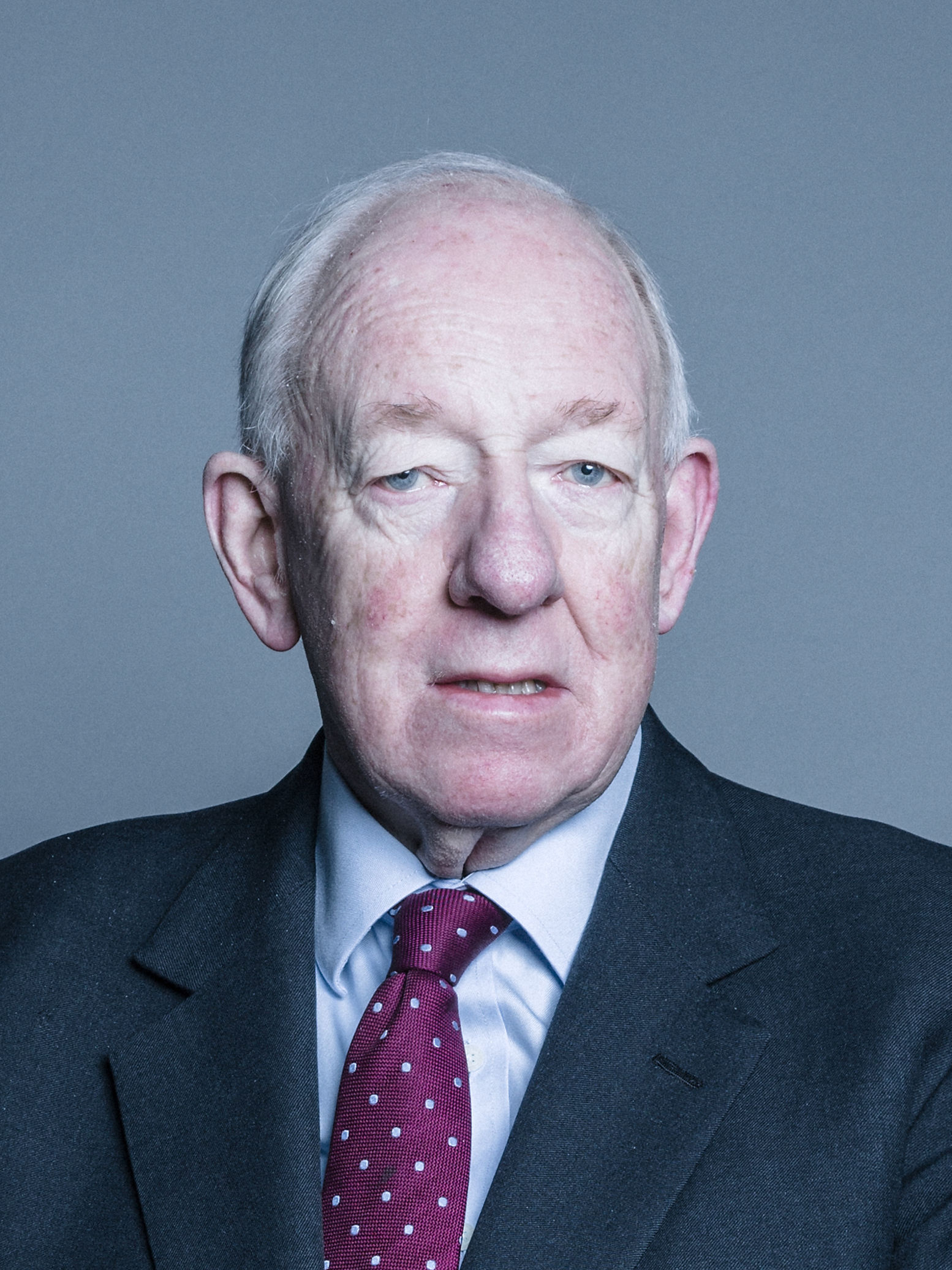
- Official portrait, 2018

British High Commissioner to Australia
- In office 1 January 2000 – 1 September 2005
- Monarch: Elizabeth II
- Prime Minister: Tony Blair
- Preceded by: Alex Allan
- Succeeded by: Helen Liddell

Chief Whip Parliamentary Secretary to the Treasury
- In office 20 July 1995 – 2 May 1997
- Prime Minister: John Major
- Preceded by: Richard Ryder
- Succeeded by: Nick Brown
Shadow Cabinet portfolios
Shadow Secretary of State for International Development
In office 30 June 1997 – 1 June 1998
Leader	William Hague
Preceded by	Lynda Chalker
Succeeded by	Gary Streeter
Shadow Leader of the House of Commons
In office 2 May 1997 – 30 June 1997
Leader	John Major
Preceded by	Ann Taylor
Succeeded by	Gillian Shephard
Opposition Chief Whip in the House of Commons
In office 2 May 1997 – 23 June 1997
Leader	John Major
Preceded by	Donald Dewar
Succeeded by	James Arbuthnot
Junior ministerial offices
Minister of State for Foreign and Commonwealth Affairs
In office 15 April 1992 – 20 July 1995
Prime Minister	John Major
Preceded by	The Earl of Caithness
Succeeded by	Jeremy Hanley
Deputy Government Chief Whip Treasurer of the Household
In office 14 July 1990 – 15 April 1992
Prime Minister	Margaret Thatcher; John Major
Preceded by	Tristan Garel-Jones
Succeeded by	David Heathcoat-Amory
Comptroller of the Household
In office 25 July 1989 – 14 July 1990
Prime Minister	Margaret Thatcher
Preceded by	Tristan Garel-Jones
Succeeded by	George Young
Parliamentary Under-Secretary of State for Energy
In office 11 September 1984 – 13 June 1987
Prime Minister	Margaret Thatcher
Preceded by	Giles Shaw
Succeeded by	Michael Spicer
Lord Commissioner of the Treasury
In office 16 February 1982 – 10 September 1984
Prime Minister	Margaret Thatcher
Preceded by	Tony Newton
Succeeded by	John Major
Assistant Government Whip
In office 9 January 1981 – 5 February 1982
Prime Minister	Margaret Thatcher
Parliamentary offices
Member of the House of Lords
Lord Temporal
Life peerage 19 July 2005 – 29 February 2024
Member of Parliament for Eddisbury Northwich (1974–1983)
In office 28 February 1974 – 28 June 1999
Preceded by	John Foster
Succeeded by	Stephen O'Brien

Personal details
- Born: 4 July 1943 (age 83)
- Party: Conservative
- Spouse: Cecilia Hurst
- Education: King's College, Cambridge

Alastair Robertson Goodlad, Baron Goodlad, KCMG, PC (born 4 July 1943), is a British politician who served as Chief Whip of the parliamentary Conservative Party from 1995 to 1997, and British High Commissioner to Australia from 2000 to 2005. He was Member of Parliament (MP) for Northwich and later for Eddisbury from 1974 to 1999. Goodlad sat in the House of Lords as a life peer from 2005 to 2024.

== Early life ==
Born in 1943, Goodlad attended Marlborough College and read law at King's College, Cambridge.

== Parliamentary career ==
He first stood for Parliament in 1970 when he contested Crewe, but was beaten by Labour's Scholefield Allen.

Goodlad was Member of Parliament successively for Northwich (1974–83) and Eddisbury (1983–99). He also served as a junior Foreign Office Minister then as Prime Minister John Major's Parliamentary Secretary to the Treasury and Chief Whip, for which in the 1997 Prime Minister's Resignation Honours he was knighted as a Knight Commander of the Order of St. Michael and St. George (KCMG). Following the 1997 election, he served in the Shadow Cabinet as Shadow Leader of the House of Commons, Shadow Secretary of State for International Development and Opposition Chief Whip.

=== Membership of Lloyd's of London ===
Goodlad was an underwriting member of the Lloyd's of London insurance market, commencing in 1977 and ceasing in 1990. His membership coincided in the latter years with the rising tide of asbestos losses and his share is estimated to have been about £90,000.

== High Commissioner to Australia ==
Labour Prime Minister Tony Blair then appointed Goodlad as High Commissioner to Australia. Goodlad accepted the office of Steward and Bailiff of the Chiltern Hundreds on 28 June 1999 to formally vacate his parliamentary seat, triggering the 1999 Eddisbury by-election.

Goodlad took up office as High Commissioner in 2000. At the end of his term in 2005, he was replaced by former Secretary of State for Scotland, Helen Liddell.

== House of Lords ==
On 19 July 2005, he was created a life peer as Baron Goodlad, of Lincoln in the County of Lincolnshire, and was introduced in the House of Lords the following day. He sits on the Conservative benches and was chairman of the Constitution Select Committee from 2008 to 2010.

In 2007, Goodlad was appointed Chairman of the Britain–Australia Society.

== Personal life ==
Goodlad married Cecilia Barbara Hurst, granddaughter of David Lindsay, 27th Earl of Crawford in 1968 and has two sons.

== Notes ==
Parliament of the United Kingdom
Preceded by John Foster	Member of Parliament for Northwich; 1974–1983	Constituency abolished
New constituency	Member of Parliament for Eddisbury; 1983–1999	Succeeded by Stephen O'Brien
Political offices
Preceded by Tristan Garel-Jones	Comptroller of the Household; 1989–1990	Succeeded by Sir George Young
Preceded by Tristan Garel-Jones	Government Deputy Chief Whip in the House of Commons; Treasurer of the Household; 1990–1992	Succeeded by David Heathcoat-Amory
Preceded by Richard Ryder	Government Chief Whip in the Commons; Parliamentary Secretary to the Treasury; 1995–1997	Succeeded by Nick Brown
Preceded by Ann Taylor	Shadow Leader of the House of Commons; 1997	Succeeded by Gillian Shephard
Preceded by Clare Short	Shadow Secretary of State for International Development; 1997–1998	Succeeded by Gary Streeter
Party political offices
Preceded by Tristan Garel-Jones	Conservative Deputy Chief Whip in the House of Commons; 1990–1992	Succeeded by David Heathcoat-Amory
Preceded by Richard Ryder	Conservative Chief Whip in the House of Commons; 1995–1997	Succeeded by James Arbuthnot
Diplomatic posts
Preceded by Alex Allan	British High Commissioner to Australia; 1999–2005	Succeeded by Helen Liddell
Orders of precedence in the United Kingdom
Preceded by The Lord Soley	Gentlemen; Baron Goodlad	Followed by The Lord Turnbull
