= Angus Maude =

English politician (1912–1993)

The Right Honourable The Lord Maude of Stratford-upon-Avon TD PC

Paymaster General
- In office 4 May 1979 – 5 January 1981
- Prime Minister: Margaret Thatcher
- Preceded by: Shirley Williams
- Succeeded by: Francis Pym

Member of Parliament for Stratford-on-Avon
- In office 15 August 1963 – 13 May 1983
- Preceded by: John Profumo
- Succeeded by: Alan Howarth

Member of Parliament for Ealing South
- In office 23 February 1950 – 18 April 1958
- Preceded by: Constituency created
- Succeeded by: Brian Batsford

Personal details
- Born: 8 September 1912 Hendon, Middlesex, England
- Died: 9 November 1993 (aged 81) Banbury, Oxfordshire, England
- Party: Conservative
- Spouse: Barbara Sutcliffe (m. 1946)
- Children: 3, including Francis
- Education: Oriel College, Oxford

Angus Edmund Upton Maude, Baron Maude of Stratford-upon-Avon, TD, PC (8 September 1912 – 9 November 1993) was an English Conservative Party politician. A member of parliament (MP) from 1950 to 1958 and from 1963 to 1983, he served as a cabinet minister from 1979 to 1981. He was the father of former Conservative MP Francis Maude.

== Early life ==
Maude was born at 44 Temple Fortune Lane, Hendon, Middlesex, the only child of Alan Hamer Maude (1885–1979), journalist and army officer, and Dorothy Maude Upton, daughter of Frederic Upton, a civil servant. He was educated, mainly in Classics, at Rugby School, then attended Oriel College, Oxford, where he obtained a second-class degree in Politics, Philosophy and Economics in 1933. He became a journalist and author, working on The Times (1933–34) and the Daily Mail (1934–39).

Maude fought in the Second World War. He was captured in North Africa, becoming a POW in Italy. He was later moved to Germany, where he was freed by forces under General George S. Patton.

== Parliamentary career ==
Maude was elected Conservative Party member of parliament for Ealing South at the 1950 general election. He continued to work in journalism, and was Director of the Conservative Political Centre from 1951 to 1955. In 1958, he resigned his seat to become editor of The Sydney Morning Herald, a post which he held until 1961. He attempted to return to Parliament, at first being beaten by the Labour Party's Guy Barnett by 704 votes in a 1962 by-election at South Dorset, where the Conservative vote was split. He was then elected to represent the constituency of Stratford-on-Avon in a a by-election in 1963, where he remained until retiring in 1983.

Maude was shadow aviation spokesman, but was sacked in 1967 by Edward Heath after criticising party policy. When Margaret Thatcher became leader, she brought him back into the fold after he played a key role in her bid for the leadership in 1975. When she came to power in May 1979, he was appointed to the position of Paymaster General with a seat in the cabinet, with Thatcher saying "I was anxious to have Angus Maude in the Cabinet to benefit from his years of political experience, his sound views, and his acid wit." However, Maude resigned relatively soon afterward, in January 1981, following which he received a knighthood.

Maude was a friend of the Rev. Ian Paisley.

== House of Lords ==
Maude gave up his seat at the 1983 general election, and was elevated to the House of Lords as a life peer on 19 September 1983, taking the title Baron Maude of Stratford-upon-Avon, of Stratford-upon-Avon in the County of Warwickshire. He died in 1993.

He was nicknamed "The Mekon" because of his prominent forehead and overbearing manner.

== Writings ==
In 1949 Maude co-authored a book "The English Middle Classes" with English writer and small press printer Roy Lewis,

- Lewis, Roy; Maude, Angus (1950) [1949]. The English Middle Classes (US ed.). London.

In 1955 Maude co-authored a book "The Biography of a Nation" with fellow Conservative MP, Enoch Powell.

- Powell, Enoch; Maude, Angus (1970) [1955]. Biography of a Nation (second ed.). London. ISBN 0-212-98373-3.

Parliament of the United Kingdom
New constituency	Member of Parliament for Ealing South; 1950–1958	Succeeded by Brian Batsford
Preceded by John Profumo	Member of Parliament for Stratford-upon-Avon; 1963–1983	Succeeded by Alan Howarth
Political offices
Preceded by Shirley Williams	Paymaster General; 1979–1981	Succeeded by Francis Pym
