= 1943 Ashford by-election =

UK Parliamentary by-election

The 1943 Ashford by-election was held on 10 February 1943. The by-election was held due to the appointment of the incumbent Conservative MP, Patrick Spens, as Chief Justice of India. It was won by the Conservative candidate Edward Percy Smith.

Ashford by-election, 1943
Party	Candidate	Votes	%	±%
Conservative	Edward Percy Smith	9,648	69.7	+10.5
Common Wealth	Catherine Williamson	4,192	30.3	New
Majority		5,456	39.4	N/A
Turnout		13,840	27.7	−45.9
Conservative hold		Swing		
