= 1958 Ealing South by-election =

UK Parliamentary by-election

The 1958 Ealing South by-election of 12 June 1958 was held after the resignation of Conservative Party MP Angus Maude.

The seat had been won by the Conservatives at the 1955 United Kingdom general election by over 12,000 votes. The Conservative Party held the seat.

== Result of the previous general election ==
General election 1955: Ealing South
Party	Candidate	Votes	%	±%
Conservative	Angus Maude	25,992	59.57	−2.9
Labour	David G. Allen	13,462	30.85	−6.7
Liberal	David Evans	4,182	9.58	New
Majority		12,530	28.72	+3.8
Turnout		43,636	77.9	−4.4
Conservative hold		Swing	+1.9	

== Result of the by-election ==
By-election 1958: Ealing South
Party	Candidate	Votes	%	±%
Conservative	Brian Batsford	17,417	50.29	−9.28
Labour	Hugh Gervais Garside	11,258	32.51	+1.66
Liberal	Philip Skelsey	5,956	17.20	+7.62
Majority		6,159	17.78	−10.94
Turnout		34,631	64.5	−13.3
Conservative hold		Swing	-5.5	
