= Kitty Wintringham =

American journalist

Katharine Wise Wintringham (10 February 1908 – 1966) was an American political activist, best known for her activities in the United Kingdom.

== Early life ==
Born Kitty Bowler in Plymouth, Massachusetts, Wintringham studied at Bryn Mawr College. There, she became involved in anti-fascist activity, joining the League Against War and Fascism and the International Labor Defense.

== Travels and communism ==
In 1936, Bowler travelled to Europe, intending to travel around Europe before meeting up with her friend Martha Gellhorn in France. She first went to the Soviet Union, where she had a brief relationship with Walter Duranty, then to France, and on to Barcelona. This was during the Spanish Civil War, and Bowler met Tom Wintringham, representative of the Communist Party of Great Britain (CPGB) in the city. Wintringham taught Bowler journalism skills, while Bowler assisted him by delivering messages and acting as his unofficial secretary.

The two fell in love, but Wintringham was already married. The CPGB was wary of Bowler as she was not a full US party member, and disapproved of her having been apprised by two of Wintrigham's friends, Sylvia Townsend Warner and Valentine Ackland, that she was unreliable and a distraction from Wintringham's organisational work in Spain. Warner and Acland, who were in Spain at Wintringham's behest, were close friends of Wintingham's mistress Amelia Baruch, siding with her over his various other romantic interests, to Bowler's misfortune. Despite Kitty joining the Spanish Communist Party on arriving in Spain, and applying to join the CPUSA through a personal letter of approval from Wintringham to Joseph North, her reputation at King Street was unsalvageable. Bowler claimed that, when she delivered a message from Wintringham to the King St office, she asked that they recall Wintringham, but Harry Pollitt, leader of the CPGB, responded by saying he should "go up to the front line, get himself killed to give us a headline".

Bowler returned to Spain and took on various journalistic assignments, sharing a hotel room in Valencia with Kate Mangan, who at that time was working in the Government Press Office. However, early in 1937, she was detained on the orders of André Marty on suspicion of being a spy, and expelled from the country. Wintringham was shot in the leg the following month, and she was allowed back into Spain to help nurse him. However, the CPGB ordered Wintringham to stop associating with Bowler, and in July she was again expelled from Spain, on this occasion returning to the United States.

== Return to the UK and Second World War ==
Wintringham recovered from his injury, but was shot again in August, and was sent back to the UK to receive treatment in November 1937. Kitty arrived in London in mid-October to wait for him. In December, once he had left hospital, the couple set up home together in London, leading to Wintringham's expulsion from the CPGB in June 1938. They married in 1941, once Wintringham's divorce was complete.

She worked as a journalist in the UK, but as Tom Wintringham's writing became more demanding, she increasingly took on organisational work for him, including ghost writing, or un-credited co-authorship of some of his 1940 works. This included the organisation of the course for Home Guards at Osterley Park, and the course's corresponding government published handbook The Home Guard can Fight. She and Tom joined the left-wing 1941 Committee and were founders of its successor, the Common Wealth Party. However, Kitty strongly disagreed with leading member Richard Acland over his advocacy of Christianity, while Acland publicly opposed Kitty's proposals and policy papers, and privately dismissed and derided her in personal and sexist terms. She stood for the party in Midlothian and Peebles Northern at the 1945 UK general election, but took only 6.4% of the votes cast. Vincent Geoghegan considers this to be the only seat where the party put up a candidate against Labour and affected the final result, although this meant that the Conservatives won the seat.

== Post-war life ==
After World War II, Kitty gave birth to a child, Benjamin, and focused on bringing him up. Tom died suddenly in 1949 and, a few years later, Kitty moved to Hawaii, but she later returned to the UK. Through the 1950s she ensured Wintringham's final writings were published, renewed her friendship with schoolfriend Martha Gellhorn and maintained a close relationship with Dr. Douglas Jolly, but had a shrinking circle of friends in the UK from her past political circles. She encouraged Benjamin (Ben) in outdoor pursuits such as walking and climbing as a child and assisted in his design and making of sports climbing equipment, of which he was a pioneer, and the two founded an early climbing equipment business together. In the early 1960s, she took great pains to assemble, keep and order an archive of her own and Tom's writings, both public and private, and in the early 60s collaborated with Hugh Thomas on his history of the Spanish Civil war, Hugh Ford on his study of the poetry of that war, and Stewart Hall and Anthony Smith on their studies of mid-century political journalism, allowing access to these papers as a resource. She committed suicide in 1966.
