= Catherine Williamson =

Irish politician

Catherine Ellis Williamson (née Goodbody; 1 May 1896 – 25 April 1977) was an Irish politician.

Born in Dublin to lawyer Lewis Goodbody and his wife Edith (née Pim), Williamson studied at Cheltenham Ladies College and in St Germain-en-Laye in Paris. For part of World War I, she taught Braille at St Dunstan's in London, before becoming a director of J. J. Williamson & Sons, her family's tannery business in Canterbury.

Williamson joined the Labour Party and was elected to Canterbury City Council in 1935, serving as Mayor of Canterbury from 1939 to 1941: the city's first woman mayor. Soon afterwards, she defected to the Common Wealth Party, for which she stood in the 1943 Ashford by-election, taking 30.3% of the vote against a single opponent. She stood in Canterbury at the 1945 United Kingdom general election but, facing both Labour and Conservative opponents, could only take 2.6% of the votes cast.

Williamson rejoined Labour late in the 1940s, and stood in East Grinstead at the 1950 general election, and in Hastings in 1951. She travelled widely, particularly to China, where she met Mao Zedong and Zhou Enlai.

Long a member of the Society of Friends, Williamson also identified as a member of the Church of England, and joined the Chinese Patriotic Catholic Association.
