= Tom Wintringham =

British politician and historian (1898–1949)

Thomas Henry Wintringham
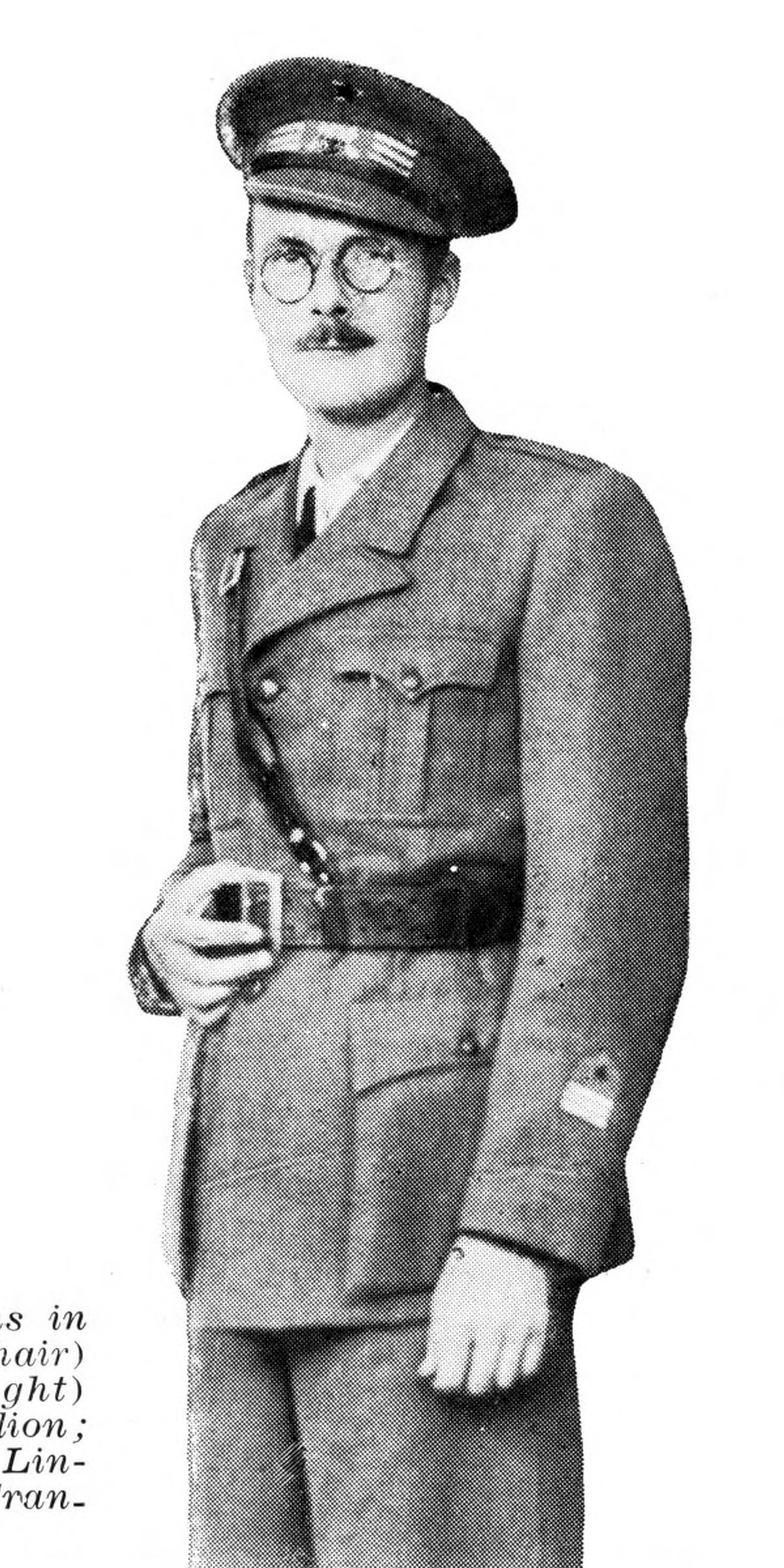
- Wintringham in Spain, 1937
- Born: 15 May 1898; Grimsby, Lincolnshire, England
- Died: 16 August 1949 (aged 51); Owmby, Lincolnshire, England
- Spouse(s): Elizabeth Arkwright, Millie Baruch, Kitty Bowler
- Children: 4
- Military career
- Allegiance: Spanish Republic; United Kingdom
- Branch: International Brigades
- Unit: The British Battalion, part of the XV International Brigade
- Conflicts: Spanish Civil War

Thomas Henry Wintringham (15 May 1898 – 16 August 1949) was a British soldier, military historian, journalist, poet, Marxist, politician and author. He was a supporter of the Home Guard during the Second World War and was one of the founders of the Common Wealth Party.

== Biography ==
=== Early life ===
Tom Wintringham was born 1898 in Grimsby, Lincolnshire. He was educated at Gresham's School, Holt, and Balliol College, Oxford. In 1915 he was elected to a Brackenbury scholarship in History at Balliol, but during the First World War postponed his university career to join the Royal Flying Corps, serving as a mechanic and motorcycle despatch rider.

At the end of the war he was involved in a brief barracks mutiny, one of many minor insurrections which went unnoticed in the period. He returned to Oxford, and in a long vacation made a visit of some months to Moscow, after which he returned to England and formed a group of students aiming to establish a British section of the Third International, a Communist party. As the party was formed, Wintringham graduated from Oxford and moved to London, ostensibly to study for the bar at the Temple, but in fact to work full-time in politics.

=== Political career and the Spanish Civil War ===
In 1923, Wintringham joined the recently formed Communist Party of Great Britain. In 1925, he was one of the twelve CPGB officials imprisoned for seditious libel and incitement to mutiny. In 1930, he helped to found the Communist newspaper, the Daily Worker, and was one of the few named writers to publish articles in it. In writing for the Communist party's theoretic journal Labour Monthly, he established himself as the party's military expert. In LM articles and in booklets on the subject, Wintringham formed the arguments against Air Assault and called for air raid precautions (ARP) several years before the bombing of Guernica. His arguments were the basis for the most successful of the Communist Party's wartime campaigns, that for ARP provision, and shaped government policy on the issue in the years leading up to the war.

Although at the centre of the CPGB organisation, he was often at odds with Party policy, believing in a communism of alliance and co-operation, rather than the dominant Comintern ideology of "class against class". Wintringham's ideas became party dogma when the Comintern announced the 'Popular Front', a form of communism Wintringham was prepared to fight for.

In 1934, he became the founder, editor and major contributor of Left Review, the first British literary journal with a stated Marxist intent. Although published by Wintringham as an organ of his British section of the Writers and Artists International group and funded by the CPGB, it embraced writers of all shades of socialism, regardless of their party affiliations. The journal established a pattern for what was to become cultural studies.

In 1935, he wrote The Coming World War, which was published both in the UK and the USA. In it, he predicted an inevitable world war between the imperialist powers and the USSR, most likely beginning with a conflict over Manchuria; that it would be primarily a mechanised conflict and therefore susceptible to revolutionary action by the working class.

At the start of the Spanish Civil War, Wintringham went to Barcelona as a journalist for the Daily Worker, but he joined and eventually commanded the British Battalion of the International Brigades. Some socialist commentators have credited him with the whole idea of "international" brigades. He also had an affair with a US journalist, Kitty Bowler, whom he later married.

In February 1937 he was wounded in the Battle of Jarama. While injured in Spain he became friends with Ernest Hemingway, who based one of his characters upon him. He spent some months as a machine gun instructor. When he returned to the battalion the next summer he contracted typhoid, was again wounded at Quinto in August 1937 and was repatriated in October. His later book English Captain is based on these experiences.

In 1938, the Communist Party condemned Kitty Bowler as a Trotskyist spy but he refused to leave her, quitting the party instead. He came to mistrust the Party's subservience to Joseph Stalin's Soviet Union and Comintern. Back in England, Tom Hopkinson recruited him to work for the magazine Picture Post.

=== Second World War ===
On returning from Spain, Wintringham began to call for an armed civilian guard to repel any Axis invasion, and as early as 1938 he had begun campaigning for what would become the Home Guard. He taught the troops tactics of guerrilla warfare, including a movement known as the 'Monkey Crawl'. They were also taught how to deal with dive bombers.

At the outbreak of the Second World War, Wintringham applied for an army officer's commission but was rejected. When the Communist Party promulgated its policy of staying out of the war due to the Molotov–Ribbentrop Pact, he strongly condemned their policies. Because of the appeasement policies of prime minister Neville Chamberlain, he also imagined the Tories to be Nazi sympathizers and wrote that they should be removed from office. He wrote for Picture Post, the Daily Mirror, and wrote columns for Tribune and the New Statesman.

In May 1940, after the escape from Dunkirk, Wintringham began to write in support of the Local Defence Volunteers, the forerunner of the Home Guard. On 10 July, he opened the private Home Guard training school at Osterley Park, London.

Wintringham's training methods were mainly based on his experience in Spain. He even had veterans who had fought alongside him in Spain who trained volunteers in anti-tank warfare and demolitions. He also taught street fighting and guerrilla warfare. He wrote many articles in Picture Post and the Daily Mirror propagating his views about the Home Guard with the motto "a people's war for a people's peace".

The British Army deemed Wintringham unreliable because of his communist past, and after September 1940, when the army began to take charge of the Home Guard training in Osterley, Wintringham and his comrades were gradually sidelined. Wintringham resigned in April 1941. Despite his activities in support of the Home Guard, Wintringham was never allowed to join the organisation itself because of a policy barring membership to Fascists and Communists.

New Ways of War by Tom Wintringham

In 1942, Wintringham proceeded to found a Common Wealth Party with Vernon Bartlett, Sir Richard Acland and J. B. Priestley. He received 48 percent of the vote at the Midlothian and Peebles Northern by-election in February 1943, previously a safe Tory seat. In the 1945 general election he stood in the Aldershot constituency, the Labour Party candidate standing down to give him a clear race against the incumbent Conservative MP. His election agent was Mamie Woolf. His wife Kitty stood in the same Midlothian constituency that he had come close to winning two years earlier, but neither was elected. After the war Wintringham and many of the founders of Common Wealth left and joined the Labour Party, suggesting the dissolving of CW.

=== Later life ===
In his later years he worked mainly in radio and film, both producing documentary and critical programmes and writing criticism. He continued to write about military history, opposing the use and development of atomic weapons and championing Mao's China and Tito's Yugoslavia over the monolithic bureaucracy of the Soviet Union. While he recognised and opposed the purges and repression that marred the achievements of the Soviet Union, he never accepted that Stalin himself was complicit or responsible for them.

His later campaigns and writing were mainly centred on the formation of a 'World Guard', a neutral volunteer force (initially) to police Palestine and the partitioned India, and to be at the disposal of the United Nations.

Tom Wintringham died on 16 August 1949, aged 51, after a massive heart attack while he was staying with his sister at her farm at Owmby, Lincolnshire.

== Bibliography ==
=== Books by Tom Wintringham ===
- War! And the way to fight against it, Communist Party of Great Britain, London, 1932
- Air Raid Warning! Why the Royal Air Force is to be doubled, Workers' Bookshop, London, 1934
- The Coming World War, Wishart, 1935
- Mutiny. Mutinies from Spartacus to Invergordon, Stanley Nott, London 1936
- English Captain, Faber 1939 (also in Penguin)
- How to reform the army ('Fact No. 98'), London, 1939
- Wintringham, Tom (1940). Deadlock War. Faber and Faber. ASIN B000OEKCHS.
- Arm the Citizens, War Office/Hulton Press, 1940
- New Ways of War, Penguin Special, 1940
- Armies of Freemen, Routledge, 1940
- The Home Guard Can Fight: A summary of courses at Osterley Park Training School, HMSO/War Office, 1941
- Ferdinand Otto Miksche: Blitzkrieg, translated by Tom Wintringham, Faber, London, 1941
- Freedom is our Weapon. A Policy for Army Reform, Kegan Paul, 1941
- Politics of Victory, Routledge, 1941
- Yank Levy Guerrilla Warfare, Penguin, 1942 (ghost written and with an introduction by Tom Wintringham)
- Peoples' War, Penguin Special, 1942
- Inside Fascist Spain, Pilot Press, 1943
- Italy and Revolution, Common Wealth Press, 1943
- Weapons and Tactics from Troy to Stalingrad, Houghton Mifflin, Boston, USA 1943, republished 1973 with Col. John Blashford-Snell ISBN 0-14-021522-0
- Your M.P. By 'Gracchus'. Gollancz, 1944
- We're Going On – Collected Poems, Smokestack Books, UK, 2006

=== Books and articles about Tom Wintringham ===
- Atkin, Malcolm (2015). Fighting Nazi Occupation: British Resistance 1939–1945 ISBN 978-1473833777
- Baxell, Richard (2012). Unlikely Warriors: The British in the Spanish Civil War and the Struggle Against Fascism ISBN 978-1781312339
- Calder, Angus L. (1968). The Common Wealth Party 1942–1945
- Cullen, Stephen (2012). In Search of the Real Dad's Army: The Home Guard and the Defence of the United Kingdom 1940–1944ISBN 978-1473878228
- Fernbach, David (Autumn 1982). "Tom Wintringham and Socialist Defense Strategy". History Workshop, No. 14, pp. 63–91. JSTOR.
- Geoghegan, Vincent (2013). Socialism and Religion: Roads to Common Wealth ISBN 978-0415830225
- Gurney, Jason (1974). Crusade in Spain ISBN 978-0-571-10310-2
- Margoleis, David (1993). Writing the Revolution: Cultural Criticism from "Left Review"
- Preston, Paul (2008). We Saw Spain Die ISBN 978-1845299460.
- Purcell, Hugh (2004). The Last English Revolutionary: A Biography of Tom Wintringham 1898–1949

– 2nd Enlarged, Revised and Updated edition: by Phyll Smith (2012), ISBN 1845194489

- Rust, William (1939). Britons in Spain. A History of the British Battalion of the XVth International Brigade
- Steel, Johannes (1942). Men Behind the War, a Who's Who of Our Time
- Tatchell, Peter (1985). Democratic Defence: A Non-Nuclear Alternative

Media offices
Preceded by J. R. Campbell	Editor of the Workers' Weekly; 1926–1927	Succeeded by Publication closed
Preceded by New publication	Editor of Workers' Life; 1927–1930	Succeeded by Publication closed
