= Ernest Millington =

British politician

Ernest Millington DFC

Member of Parliament for Chelmsford
- In office 26 April 1945 – 3 February 1950
- Preceded by: John Macnamara
- Succeeded by: Sir Hubert Ashton

Personal details
- Born: Ernest Rogers Millington; 15 February 1916 Ilford, England
- Died: 9 May 2009 (aged 93) France
- Party: Common Wealth (1945–1946); Labour (1946–1950)
- Spouses: Gwen Pickard (m. 1937; div. 1974) Ivy Robinson (m. 1974)
- Children: 4
- Education: College of St Mark and St John; Birkbeck, University of London
- Profession: Teacher

Military service
- Allegiance: United Kingdom
- Branch/service: Royal Air Force
- Rank: Wing Commander
- Unit: No. 227 Squadron RAF
- Battles/wars: World War II
- Awards: Distinguished Flying Cross

Ernest Rogers Millington DFC (15 February 1916 – 9 May 2009) was a British Common Wealth and later Labour Member of Parliament (MP).

Following the death of John Profumo on 10 March 2006, Millington was the only living former MP from the 38th Parliament, elected prior to the 1945 general election. He was also the last surviving person to have served as a Common Wealth Party MP.

== Biography ==
=== Education ===
Millington was educated at Chigwell, the College of St Mark and St John, Chelsea, and Birkbeck College, London. He served with the RAF Bomber Command during the Second World War, where he rose to the rank of wing commander and was awarded the Distinguished Flying Cross in 1945.

=== Parliamentarian ===
He was elected as MP for Chelmsford at a by-election in April 1945, for the short-lived Common Wealth Party. The vacancy was created by the death of the previous Conservative member, Colonel John Macnamara, killed on active service in Italy. Whereas the Conservative, Liberal and Labour parties had agreed an electoral truce, the Common Wealth Party refused to accept this. The local CW Party had six members and soon raised £200 for the electoral campaign. After a brief discussion the local Communist Party decided not to support him. Nevertheless, he received the support of much of the labour movements as he advocated a distinctly socialist programme.

Millington wore his DFC ribbon on his uniform when attending the House of Commons, as was customary at the time. Many years later he fondly recalled being reprimanded by a Conservative MP who bemoaned the fact that Millington's ribbon was being incorrectly worn. Millington told the BBC, "I was approached by a Tory MP dressed in civilian clothes and with a hand in his trouser pocket. 'Your DFC ribbon is worn too wide'. He was, I think, not expecting my reaction. 'If you are talking to me as an RAF officer: stand to attention; take your hand out of your trouser pocket and address a senior officer as Sir. If you are talking to me as a fellow Member of Parliament, mind your business and bugger off.'"

Millington saw himself "as a communist with a small c", and advocated a socialist programme based on nationalisation of the land and public ownership. At the by-election he overturned a Conservative majority of 16,624 to win by 6,431 votes, becoming the Baby of the House. He was one of the first public figures to question the morality of the area bombardment of Germany.

We want – that is, the people who served in Bomber Command of the Royal Air Force and their next of kin – a categorical assurance that the work we did was militarily and strategically justified.

— House of Commons, 12 March 1946

Millington held his seat in the 1945 general election and joined the Labour Party in April 1946. He lost his seat in the 1950 general election.

=== Later life ===
Millington rejoined the RAF in 1954, but later embarked on a career in education, becoming the head of education at Shoreditch Comprehensive School in 1965. He later retired to France, where he lived until his death.

Millington and his second wife Ivy emigrated to France in the early 1980s.

Millington's autobiography, Was That Really Me?, was published in 2006.

Millington was survived by his four daughters, all of whom were by his first wife Gwen, who died in 1979.

== See also ==
- United Kingdom by-election records

Parliament of the United Kingdom
Preceded by John Macnamara	Member of Parliament for Chelmsford; 1945–1950	Succeeded by Sir Hubert Ashton
Preceded by John Profumo	Baby of the House; April 1945 – July 1945	Succeeded by The Hon. Edward Carson
