= Common Wealth Party =

- Abbreviation: CW
- Founded: 26 July 1942
- Dissolved: 1993
- Merger of: 1941 Committee; Forward March
- Ideology: Socialism; Common ownership; Syndicalism; Left-libertarianism
- Political position: Left-wing

The Common Wealth Party (CW) was a socialist political party in the United Kingdom with parliamentary representation in the House of Commons from 1942 (the middle of the Second World War) until 1946. Thereafter CW continued to function, essentially as a pressure group, until 1993.

== The war years ==
Common Wealth was founded on 26 July 1942 in World War II by the alliance of two left-wing groups: the 1941 Committee – a think tank centred on Picture Post owner Edward G. Hulton and its 'star' writers J.B. Priestley and Spanish Civil War veteran Tom Wintringham; and the neo-Christian Forward March movement led by Liberal Party Member of Parliament (MP) Sir Richard Acland, along with independents such as the industrialist and designer Robert Dudley Best and former Liberals who believed that the party had no direction. It aimed to be more appealing to Labour's potential voters than those leaning towards Conservatism.

Common Wealth stood for three principles: Common Ownership, Morality in Politics and Vital Democracy. Disagreeing with the electoral pact established with other parties in the wartime coalition, key figures in the 1941 Committee began sponsoring independent candidates in by-elections under the banner of the Nine Point Group.

Following the electoral success of Tom Driberg with this support in 1942, the Committee, a social movement, proposed becoming a political party through a merger with Forward March, though many preferred movement status. Through pressure from Priestley and Wintringham, 'Party' was never formally part of Common Wealth's name. The group was led by Acland (MP), Vernon Bartlett, J.B. Priestley, and Tom Wintringham. Its programme of common ownership echoed that of the Labour Party but had more idealistic perspective, later termed "libertarian socialist". It came to reject the State-dominated form of socialism adopted by Labour under the influence of Beatrice and Sidney Webb, aligning itself instead with co-operative, syndicalist and guild socialist traditions. A party proposal became that personal income, by taxation, should have an upper limit.

Though the party was initially chaired by Priestley, he stepped down after just a few months, unable to reconcile himself with the politics of Acland – who as a sitting MP he viewed as exerting undue influence. Wintringham was the natural successor but deferred to Acland, despite very real political differences between them.

Acland himself had a less easy-going approach. In his book The Forward March he had claimed that in Britain under a Forward March government:

[it is] the community as a whole which must decide whether or not a man shall be employed upon our resources, and how and when and in what manner he shall work ...[the community will] run camps for shirkers on very tolerable conditions.

Acland went on to say of these camps:

[Hitler] has stumbled across (or has needed to make use of) a small part, or perhaps one should say one particular aspect of, what will ultimately be required of humanity.

These differences, which led to Priestley stepping down from the leadership and his gradual withdrawal from the party (though he continued to support and endorse individual candidates), were a source of continued tension between former 1941 Committee and Nine Point Group members on one side and Forward Marchers and Christian Socialists on the other.

These differences in approach within Common Wealth were highlighted in a 1944 booklet by Tom and Kitty Wintringham entitled Fellowship or Morality?. Wintringham encouraged C. A. Smith to become party chairman, the two having been brought together for the journal Left, after quitting their respective Marxist parties (the Communist Party of Great Britain and the Independent Labour Party) for their support for the war, and Smith's election in 1944 strengthened the party's syndicalist, libertarian vision.

The war administration was an all-party coalition government incorporating the Conservative, Labour, and Liberal Parties, who agreed that their MP vacancies should be filled unopposed. Common Wealth intervention allowed a radicalising electorate to return socialist candidates in Conservative seats: in Eddisbury, Skipton and Chelmsford.

In February 1943, the party contested and lost four by-elections: on the tenth in Ashford Catherine Williamson against the Conservative by 5,000 votes; the next day, Wintringham in North Midlothian against that party's candidate by 869 votes; on the sixteenth and twenty-third against others in North Portsmouth and Watford by more than 2,000 votes.

In April, John Eric Loverseed amounted to the first winning candidate returned to the Commons, by winning Eddisbury. In November 1944, he left the party and joined Labour in May of the next year. In the 1945 general election, voters deserted Common Wealth for Labour – only Chelmsford (not fought by Labour) was held. In 1946 after Wintringham left the party, that MP, Ernest Millington, crossed the floor to join the Labour Party.

== Post–war development ==
The inability to maintain a parliamentary presence created a crisis for Common Wealth. At the Hastings conference in 1946, the party split. Two-thirds, including the original leadership, defected to Labour but were unable to persuade the remainder to disband. Tom and Kitty Wintringham left and Tom joined the Labour Party, though kept friendly with CW members and kept an active interest the party and the development of its theory and stance until his death, Kitty remained informally involved with The Libertarian until she died in 1963. Many of the new leadership then elected had joined when in the armed forces among which prominent figures of the Cairo Forces Parliament.

During the 1950s, the party made preparations to contest Oxford, with Douglas Stuckey as prospective candidate, but these were never brought to fruition. For the remainder of its existence it became, de facto, a pressure group, its organisation evolving, and generally contracting, as old age took its toll of the leading figures.

In the postwar period, CW was active in some domestic and international campaigns; it developed worldwide contacts. For Israel and the less-than-state of Palestine, it advocated two internationally recognised states. At home, it helped to form the Industrial Common Ownership Movement (ICOM) and co-campaigned for small parties to be allowed to make party political broadcasts. Through the latter campaign it developed close links with Plaid Cymru (sharing a syndicalist tradition) and the Scottish National Party.

The active collaboration led to the joint publication in 1956 of Our Three Nations. This advocated very great devolution in the United Kingdom: a 'confraternity' of self-governing states. CW also favoured regional government in England and was sympathetic to Mebyon Kernow. Members such as Banks joined the Wessex Regionalists. Executive Committee members played an active, at times leading, role in these movements, especially during the 1980s. Others were active in nascent environmentalism, including its then main political party, the Ecology Party.

In 1992, surviving members and political associates met in London for a 50th anniversary lunch. Weeks later, the death of W.J. 'Buck' Taylor, for many years the Secretary, called into question the ability to continue. Common Wealth resolved to dissolve at a Cheltenham meeting the next year.

== Archives and key accounts ==
The archives are kept by the University of Sussex. The early history was the subject of the doctoral thesis of Dr Angus Calder.

Detail of the party's formation and by-elections can be found in a biography of Wintringham, The Last English Revolutionary. The tussle between Acland's didactic Anglican-rooted Christianism and Wintringham's syndicalist Marxism is in Socialism and Religion: Roads to Common Wealth.

Primary source contemporary chronologies are in periodicals The Libertarian and then Common Wealth Journal.

== Later platform ==
Common Wealth's later political philosophy was heavily influenced by a notion that a new mode of production, known as managerialism, was replacing the archetypal forms of capitalism. This idea was drawn from works such as James Burnham's The Managerial Revolution (1941). Burnham (a former Trotskyist Marxist turned pioneering neoconservative) argued that the rise of a salaried managerial class, accompanied by the withdrawal of shareholders from active running of big businesses, was creating a split between the (legal) proprietors of organisations and a class of non-proprietorial professionals who were responsible for the day-to-day management of those organisations. CW used this to develop a modified Marxist analysis — this saw managerialism as a historical stage between capitalism and socialism.

This, per Common Wealth, characterised the Attlee government's post-war programme of nationalisation. The party set out its critique of managerialism in a pamphlet entitled Nationalisation is not Socialism (1948). In essence, this critique suggested that: many features of the Labour Party's programme had not been approved by voters; this confirmed the theory that power, in "socialised" economies as much as market ones, was in the hands of a largely unaccountable managerial class, which served the owners of capital at arm's length; most private ownership was continuing; shares were being replaced by loan stock at inflated valuations, the interest on which was paid from the profits of state-run industries; ministers refused to answer questions in parliament on operational matters, meaning that the management of nationalised industries were not subject to meaningful democratic control; worker representation at board level was either token or non-existent and often justified by stereotyping that workers did not yet have the skills required (unconvincing in CW's view given the record of the co-operative movement, the trade unions, and the Labour Party itself), and; a growing cult of "experts" (i.e. technocracy) and a drift towards authoritarianism, as in oft-appointed ex-military officers running such industries.

Worker-controlled organisations were also promoted by CW, which publicised successful real-world examples, such as the chemical manufacturer Scott Bader Commonwealth. While CW was critical of communist dictatorships, it expressed limited support for the system of worker self-management in Yugoslavia under Josep Tito (see Economy of SFR Yugoslavia).

Although sympathetic to the non-aligned movement, CW was critical of its inclusion of dictatorships from various part of the political spectrum. Some members of CW were active in Amnesty International.

== Influences in philosophy ==
Other influences during this era included humanistic psychology. Noted psychologists Dr Don Bannister and Dr James Hemming were CW members, and via Hemming and Wintringham so did their friend Ernst Schumacher make contributions to party thought. CW enthusiastically adopted the 'executive-sensory nexus' model of organisation, derived from left/right brain theory. Under this, the Executive Committee, responsible for current decision-making, is shadowed by a scrutiny panel, known in CW as the Sensory Committee, whose role is monitoring and review, research and longer-term development. CW's interest in optimising social organisation consistent with its principles also led it to develop close links with the School of Integrative Social Research at Braziers Park, Oxfordshire.

== Members of Parliament ==
Name	Constituency	Term	Later
Richard Acland	Barnstaple	1942–45	Labour Party
Vernon Bartlett	Bridgwater	1942–45	Independent Progressive
John Loverseed	Eddisbury	1943–45	Fellowship Party
Hugh Lawson	Skipton	1944–45	Labour Party
Ernest Millington	Chelmsford	1945–46	Labour Party

== Bibliography ==
=== Forward March books ===
- Unser Kampf
- Forward March (both by Richard Acland)

=== Nine Point Group ===
- The Nine Point Plan

=== Common Wealth ===
==== Pamphlets – First series 1943 ====
- Why We Fight By-Elections (1)
- Notes on Common Ownership (3)
- Common Wealth and the Political Parties (6)
- What is Common Wealth? (7)
- No Unemployment Under Common ownership (8)
- We Answer Your Questions (10)
- India (11)
- Danger and Opportunity (12)
- Common Wealth and the Beveridge Report (13)
- Open letter to the Labour Party (16)

==== Magazines and Journals ====
Left 1942-1947 Town and Country Review 1943-44 Common Wealth Review 1944-49 Common Wealth News 1949 The Libertarian 1950-1988 Common Wealth Journal 1989-1990

== Archives ==
- Common Wealth archive, University of Sussex
- Tom Wintringham archive, LHCMA

=== Large library collections ===
- University of Sheffield
- National Library of Scotland
- London School of Economics

== See also ==
- Common Wealth Party election results
