= 1944 Skipton by-election =

UK parliamentary by-election

The 1944 Skipton by-election was a parliamentary by-election for the British House of Commons constituency of Skipton, Yorkshire held on 7 January 1944.

== Vacancy ==
The by-election was caused by the death of the sitting Conservative MP, George William Rickards on 27 November 1943. He had been MP here since holding the seat at the 1933 Skipton by-election.

== Election history ==
Skipton had been won by the Conservatives at every election since 1918. At the 1933 by-election, the Conservatives had won on a minority vote in a four-way contest. The result at the last General election was as follows;

1935 general election: Skipton Electorate 51,041
Party	Candidate	Votes	%	±%
Conservative	George William Rickards	22,847	56.2	−12.0
Labour	John Davies	17,788	43.8	+12.0
Majority		5,059	12.4	−24.0
Turnout		40,635	79.6	−0.7
Conservative hold		Swing		

== Candidates ==
- The local Conservatives selected 61-year-old local clothing manufacturer, Harry Riddiough.
- The Labour party had reselected John Davies as their prospective parliamentary candidate for the general election expected to take place in 1939. He had contested the constituency at the previous general election in 1935. He had remained their candidate in waiting.

At the outbreak of war, the Conservative, Liberal and Labour parties had agreed an electoral truce which meant that when a by-election occurred, the party that was defending the seat would not be opposed by an official candidate from the other two parties. When the Labour and Liberal parties joined the Coalition government, it was agreed that any by-election candidate defending a government seat would receive a letter of endorsement jointly signed by all the party leaders.

- There was much irritation with the electoral truce within local Labour Party ranks. To this end, 57-year-old Mancunian Alderman Joseph Toole a former Labour MP for Salford South announced his candidature. He was a former Lord Mayor of Manchester from 1936 to 1937. He stood as an Independent Labour candidate. He was promptly expelled from the Labour Party for breaking the war-time electoral truce.
- On 9 December 1943 the Common Wealth Party put forward 31-year-old Leeds born engineer Lt. Hugh Lawson as their candidate. He had served in the Royal Engineers since 1940.

== Campaign ==
The writ was moved on 15 December 1943 and polling day was set for 7 January 1944, 41 days after the death of the previous MP. When nominations closed, it was to reveal a three horse race,

Conservative candidate Harry Riddiough received a joint letter of endorsement from all the leaders of the parties in the coalition. His campaign was hopeful that support for those opposed to the Conservatives would be evenly split between his two opponents. As the only local candidate he hoped this would help his campaign.

The Skipton District Labour Party decided to endorse Lawson, the Common Wealth candidate, in exchange for the guarantee that Lawson would stand down in favour of a Labour candidate at the next general election. This decision further isolated the candidacy of Joe Toole, the Independent Labour candidate. Toole's campaign was left with no local organisation. In contrast, the Lawson campaign took the shape of previous Common Wealth campaigns which had been successful at the 1943 Eddisbury by-election, organised by Kim Mackay and given the political direction of Richard Acland. In addition to full-time organisers, the Lawson campaign was supported by about 200 volunteers from outside the constituency. Many of these were apparently teachers, taking advantage of the school holidays.

Local farmers in the constituency were disenchanted with the prospect of supporting the government candidate because of low farm prices and the government's ploughing up policy.

== Result ==
The Common Wealth Party gained the seat.

1944 Skipton by-election Electorate 51,041
Party	Candidate	Votes	%	±%
Common Wealth	Hugh Lawson	12,222	44.8	New
Conservative	Harry Riddiough	12,001	44.0	−12.2
Independent Labour	Joseph Toole	3,029	11.1	New
Majority		221	0.8	N/A
Turnout		27,252	54.9	−24.7
Common Wealth gain from Conservative		Swing		

== Aftermath ==
Despite winning, Lawson made good his pledge not to contest the seat at the general election and instead stood and lost at Harrow West. Neither Riddiough or Toole stood again. Labour's John Davies did get his chance to contest the seat again at the 1945 general election but despite the swing to Labour across the country, he failed to win here. The result at the General election;

General election 1945: Skipton Electorate 53,877
Party	Candidate	Votes	%	±%
Conservative	Burnaby Drayson	17,905	41.5	−2.5
Labour	John Davies	15,704	36.4	N/A
Liberal	E. Townsend	9,546	22.1	N/A
Majority		2,201	5.1	N/A
Turnout		43,155	80.1	+25.2
Conservative gain from Common Wealth		Swing		

== See also ==
- Lists of United Kingdom by-elections
- United Kingdom by-election records
