= Roundell =

Roundell is both a surname and a given name. Notable people with the name include:

- Charles Savile Roundell (1827–1906), English cricketer, lawyer and politician
- Richard Roundell (1872–1940), British politician
- Roundell Palmer, 1st Earl of Selborne (1812–1895), English lawyer and politician
- Roundell Palmer, 3rd Earl of Selborne (1887–1971), British administrator, intelligence officer and politician
