= George Rickards =

George Rickards may refer to:

- George Rickards (footballer) (1884–1948), Australian rules footballer
- Sir George Kettilby Rickards (1812–1889), political economist
- George Rickards (politician) (1877–1943), British politician
- George C. Rickards (1860–1933), Army National Guard general
