= William Clough =

William Clough

William Clough (13 May 1862 – 11 May 1937) was a British Liberal Party politician.

== Background ==
A son of Thomas and Hannah Clough, he was educated at Steeton Provident School, Keighley Trade School and Pannal College, Harrogate. He married in 1886, Louisa Clapham of Browfield, Keighley. They had one son and one daughter.

== Career ==
He was Liberal MP for Skipton, Yorkshire from 1906 to 1918. He first stood for parliament at the 1906 General election, when he held Skipton. He was re-elected at both 1910 General Elections. He stepped down from parliament at the age of 56, at the 1918 General Election and did not stand again. He represented the Oakworth Division on the West Riding County Council.

== Sources ==
- Who Was Who
- British parliamentary election results 1885–1918, Craig, F. W. S.

Parliament of the United Kingdom
Preceded by Frederick Whitley Thomson	Member of Parliament for Skipton; 1906–1918	Succeeded by Richard Foulis Roundell
