= John Watson (Skipton MP) =

British Conservative Party politician (born 1943)

John Grenville Bernard Watson OBE (born 21 February 1943) is a Conservative Party politician in the United Kingdom.

== Parliamentary career ==
After fighting York in the February and October 1974 elections, Watson was member of parliament (MP) for Skipton from 1979 to 1983, and for Skipton and Ripon from 1983 to 1987 when he stood down. His successor was David Curry. Since 2010 the seat has been represented by Julian Smith.

== After Parliament ==
After retiring from Parliament in 1987 Watson became Chief Executive of Johnsen and Jorgensen plc. In 1990 he joined Goddard Kay Rodgers as an Executive Search Consultant and also helped to form BKW Public Relations Ltd. Between 1992 and 1997 he was Chief Executive of Bradford City Challenge. In 1997 he joined the Board of the Yorkshire Building Society until his retirement in 2005. He also became Chairman of the Bradford Community NHS Trust. Following his retirement in 2005 he was elected to represent the Boroughbridge division on North Yorkshire County Council. He retired from the Council in 2013, having also served for three years as the council's Deputy Leader. He was Chairman of NYnet Ltd between 2013 and 2019 and remains a Director of Partnership Investment Finance Ltd. He is the owner of Bay Horse Marketing Services Ltd and, in that capacity, is the editor of The Switzerland Alternative. He was appointed an OBE in 2009, upon the recommendation of John Prescott MP, for service to Urban Regeneration.

Parliament of the United Kingdom
Preceded by Burnaby Drayson	Member of Parliament for Skipton; 1979 – 1983	Constituency abolished
New constituency	Member of Parliament for Skipton and Ripon; 1983 – 1987	Succeeded by David Curry
