= Standards and Privileges Committee =

Former UK House of Commons committee

The Standards and Privileges Committee is a former committee of the United Kingdom House of Commons that existed from 1995 to 2013. The committee was established in 1995 to replace the earlier Committee of Privileges. It consisted of 10 Members of Parliament that sat to make recommendations to the House on complaints of breach of parliamentary privilege. It was itself replaced in January 2013, when it was split into the Committee on Standards and the Committee of Privileges, in order to allow the Committee of Standards to employ lay members.

The committee was appointed by the House of Commons to oversee the work of the Parliamentary Commissioner for Standards. It examined the arrangements for the compilation, maintenance and accessibility of the Register of Members' Interests and considered specific complaints made in relation to the registering or declaring of interests and any matter relating to the conduct of Members, including specific complaints in relation to alleged breaches in the Code of Conduct which were drawn to the committee's attention by the commissioner.

== Chairs ==
Committee chairs include those listed below.

Name	Start	End	Party	Constituency
Tony Newton	23 October 1996	21 March 1997	Conservative	Braintree
Robert Sheldon	25 June 1997	11 May 2001	Labour	Ashton-under-Lyne
George Young	16 July 2001	8 September 2009	Conservative	North West Hampshire
David Curry	20 October 2009	26 November 2009	Conservative	Skipton and Ripon
Malcolm Rifkind	1 December 2009	6 May 2010	Conservative	Kensington and Chelsea
Kevin Barron	27 July 2010	7 January 2013	Labour	Rother Valley
