= Ingthorpe Grange =

Building in North Yorkshire, England

Coordinates: 53°57′51″N 2°09′54″W

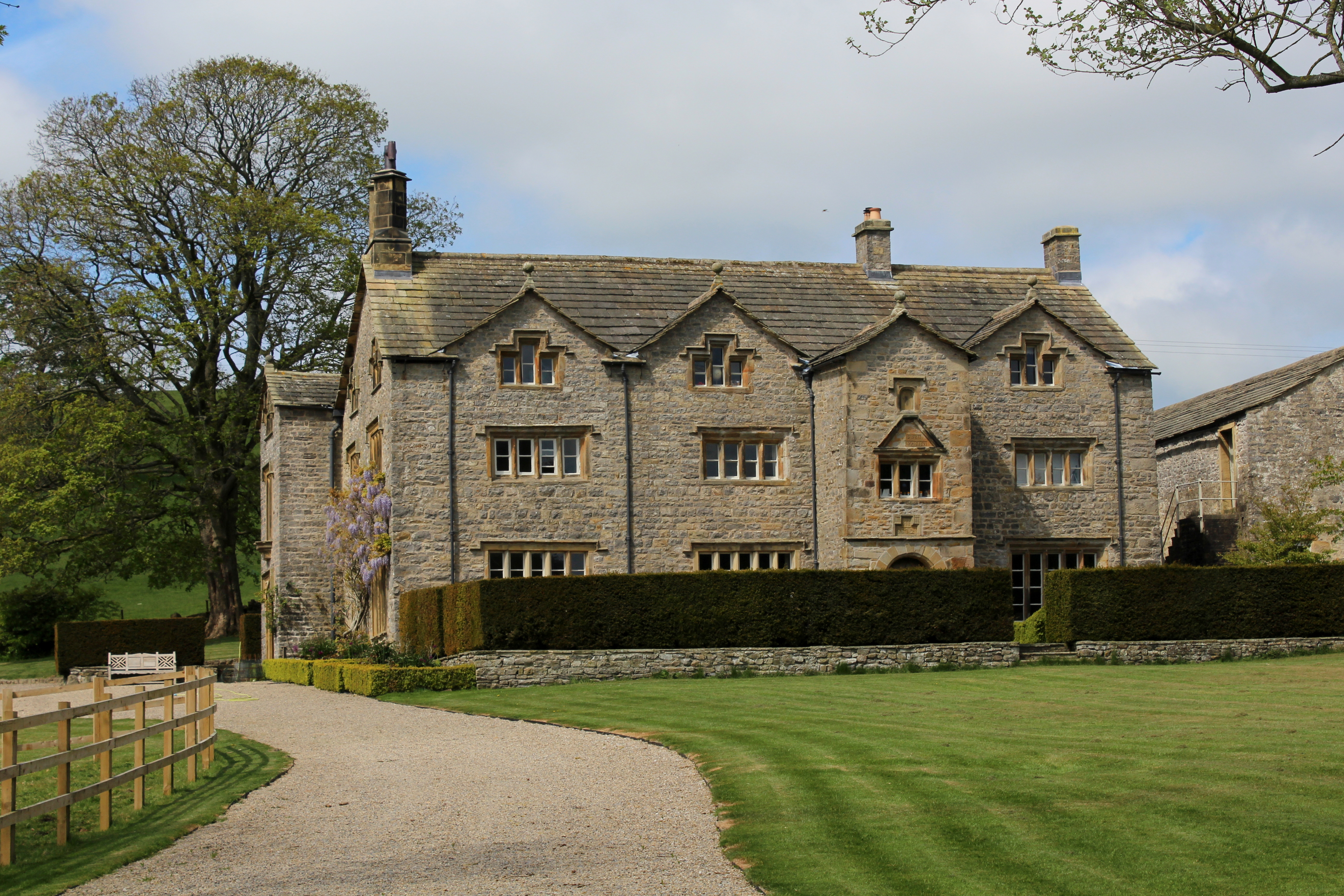
The building, in 2020

Ingthorpe Grange is a historic building near West Marton, a village in North Yorkshire, in England.

In the late Mediaeval period, there was a grange of Bolton Abbey on the site. Following the Dissolution of the Monasteries, the site was granted to Henry Clifford, 1st Earl of Cumberland. The current house was built in 1672, and in the 19th century was extended to the rear, with many windows altered and the left gable rebuilt. The building was grade II* listed in 1954. Since 2009, it has served as a bed and breakfast.

The house is built of stone with a stone-slate roof, two storeys and an attic, and a front of three gabled bays with ball finials. On the front is a full-height gabled porch with a ball finial. It contains a round-arched doorway with a chamfered surround, above which is a string course, an initialled datestone, a three-light chamfered window with a pediment-like panel containing an inscription, and a small round-headed window. Elsewhere, the windows are mullioned, those in the attic are stepped, and they all have hood moulds.

== See also ==
- Grade II* listed buildings in North Yorkshire (district)
- Listed buildings in Martons Both
