= Frederick Whitley-Thomson =

British politician

Sir Frederick Whitley Whitley-Thomson (2 September 1851 – 21 June 1925) was a British Liberal Party politician and businessman.

== Background ==
He was the son of Jonathan Thomson, merchant of Glasgow, and Emma Whitley of Halifax. He was educated at Glasgow Academy and Andersonian University, Glasgow. He married Bertha Florence Smith of Halifax in 1888. They had one daughter, Doris, who married Lieutenant Commander Kenworthy, MP. In 1914, they received a grant by Royal Licensee to use the surname Whitley-Thomson.

== Early career ==
He was the head of J. Whitley and Sons, card manufacturers of Brunswick Mills, Halifax and a Director of the English Card-clothing Company, Ltd. He served as a Governor of Halifax Technical School. He was vice-president of Halifax Liberal Association and a member of Halifax Chamber of Commerce.

== Political career ==
He sat as Liberal MP for Skipton from 1900 to 1906. In 1900, standing for parliament for the first time, he surprisingly gained the seat from the Liberal Unionists.

General election 1900 Skipton Electorate 11,665
Party	Candidate	Votes	%	±%
Liberal	Frederick Whitley Thomson	5,139	50.7	
Liberal Unionist	Walter Morrison	5,007	49.3	
Majority		132	1.4	
Turnout		10,146	87.0	
Liberal gain from Liberal Unionist		Swing		

He stood down at the general election of January 1906. In 1908, he stood as the Liberal candidate at the 1908 Ross by-election in Herefordshire. He was unable to hold this marginal Liberal seat.

1908 Ross by-election Electorate 10,486
Party	Candidate	Votes	%	±%
Liberal Unionist	Percy Archer Clive	4,947	55.7	+7.5
Liberal	Frederick Whitley Thomson	3,928	44.3	−7.5
Majority		1,019	11.4	15.0
Turnout		8,875	84.6	
Liberal Unionist gain from Liberal		Swing	+7.5	

In 1908, he was appointed as an Alderman of Halifax Borough Council and served as the mayor of Halifax from 1908 to 1911. He was a Justice of the Peace for Halifax. In January 1910, he stood as the Liberal candidate at Colchester. This was another Liberal seat, but again he failed to hold it.

General election, January 1910 Colchester Electorate 7,226
Party	Candidate	Votes	%	±%
Conservative	Laming Worthington Evans	3,717	56.0	+8.6
Liberal	Frederick Whitley Thomson	2,926	44.0	−8.6
Majority		791	12.0	17.2
Turnout		6,643	91.9	
Conservative gain from Liberal		Swing	+8.6	

== Later life ==
After 1910, he did not stand for parliament again. He was instrumental in raising a fund of £10,000 for the Royal Halifax Infirmary and Halifax District Nursing Association in memory of King Edward VII.

In 1913, his daughter Doris married the Liberal MP, Joseph Kenworthy.

He was president of the Halifax Chamber of Commerce from 1912 to 1914. He was chairman of the Finance Committee of Halifax Borough Council from 1913 to 1919. He was chairman of the Halifax War Refugees Committee, and received from King Albert I of Belgium the Medaille du Roi in recognition of services to Belgian refugees, resident in Halifax and district during the First World War.

He was knighted in the 1916 Birthday Honours.

Parliament of the United Kingdom
Preceded by Walter Morrison	Member of Parliament for Skipton; 1900–January 1906	Succeeded by William Clough
