= Martons Both =

Civil parish in North Yorkshire, England

Coordinates: 53.951°N 2.164°W

- Civil parish
- Population: 213 (2011 census)
- OS grid reference: SD892505
- Civil parish: Martons Both
- Unitary authority: North Yorkshire
- Ceremonial county: North Yorkshire
- Region: Yorkshire and the Humber
- Country: England
- Sovereign state: United Kingdom
- Post town: Skipton
- Postcode district: BD23
- Police: North Yorkshire
- Fire: North Yorkshire
- Ambulance: Yorkshire
- UK Parliament: Skipton and Ripon

Martons Both is a civil parish in the county of North Yorkshire, England.

The civil parish is formed by the villages of East Marton and West Marton.

Until 1974 it was part of the West Riding of Yorkshire. From 1974 to 2023 it was part of the Craven District, it is now administered by the unitary North Yorkshire Council.

According to the 2001 UK census, Martons Both parish had a population of 214, reducing marginally to 213 at the 2011 Census.

== See also ==
- Listed buildings in Martons Both
