= Cross Keys, East Marton =

Pub in East Marton, North Yorkshire, England

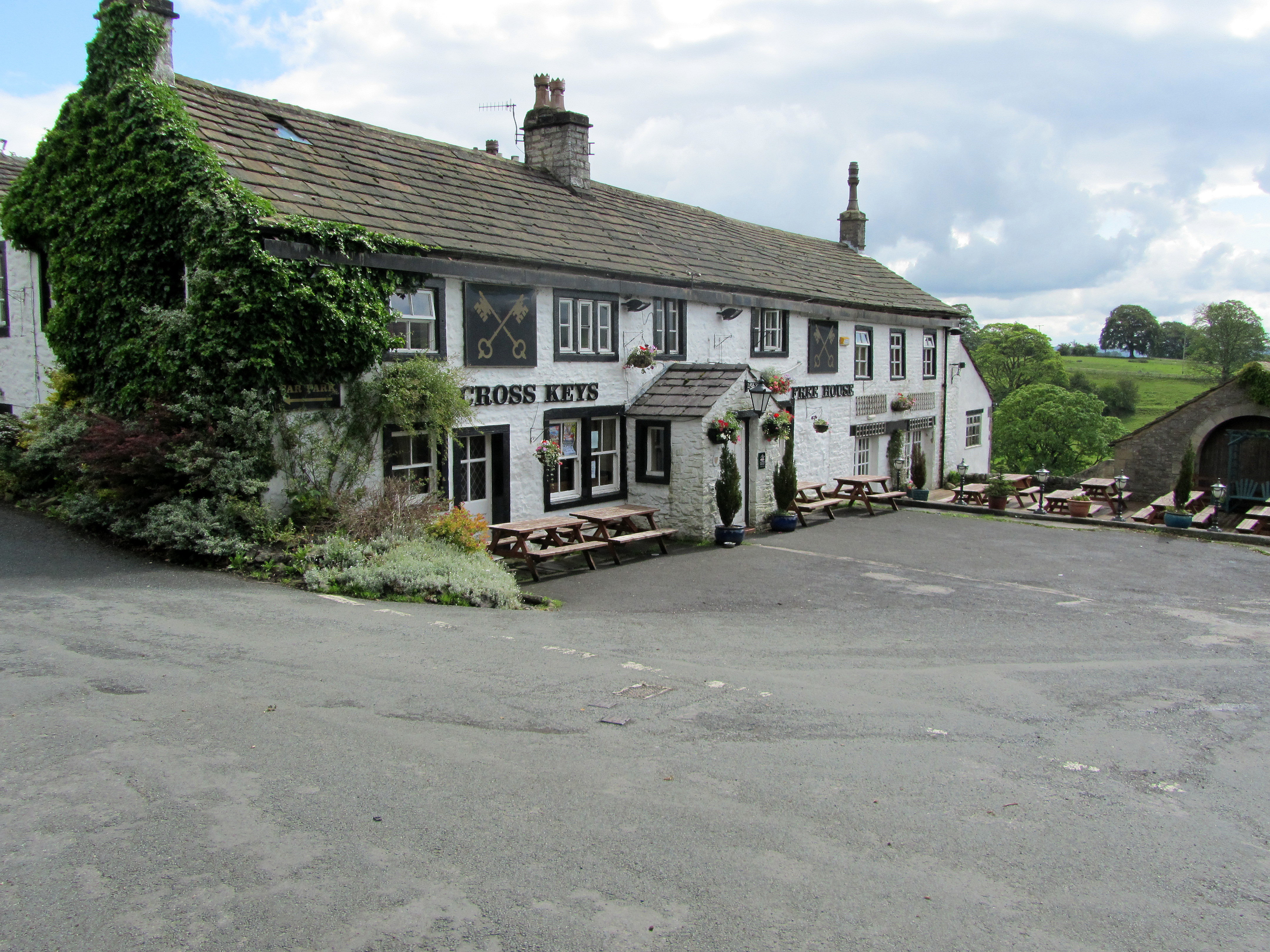
The pub, in 2011

The Cross Keys is a closed pub in East Marton, a village in North Yorkshire, in England.

The pub was probably built in the second half of the 18th century, on what is now the A59 road. It was later extended to the right, and the extension has been further altered. The pub was grade II listed in 1988. It closed in January 2020, at which time it was owned by the Wellington Pub Company. It remained empty in 2025, when its condition was described as having deterioriated.

The pub is built of stone with a stone slate roof. It has two storeys and four bays, and three bays added to the right. On the front is a gabled porch, and the windows are sashes, three on the upper floor with mullions.

== See also ==
- Listed buildings in Martons Both
