= Gledstone Hall =

Grade II* listed house in West Marton, North Yorkshire, England

Coordinates: 53.9577°N 2.1737°W

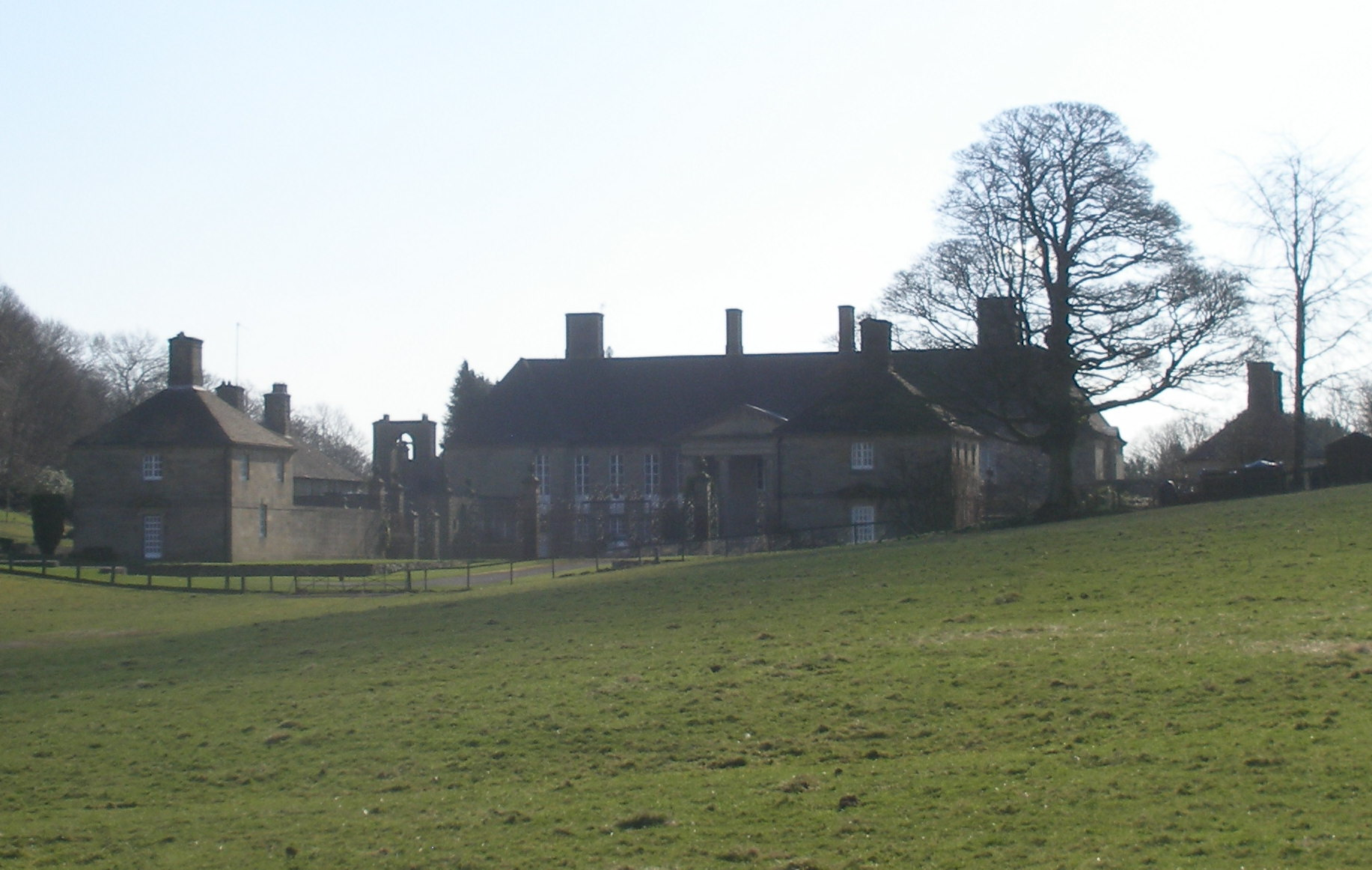
Gledstone Hall

Gledstone Hall is a 20th-century country house in West Marton, near Skipton, North Yorkshire, England. Designed by Edwin Lutyens it stands in a 12-hectare (30-acre) estate. It is a Grade II* listed building. The gardens are separately listed Grade II.

== History ==
=== Gledstone House ===
Gledstone House was a previous house (now demolished) which stood on the site and was built for Richard Roundell c. 1770, probably by John Carr of York. Roundell died before it could be completed and was succeeded by his brother, the Revd William Roundell, a Deputy Lieutenant and J.P. His son, Richard Henry Roundell, inherited and was High Sheriff of Yorkshire for 1835–36. The estate descended in the Roundell family until Richard Roundell sold it, with 2,300 hectares (5,700 acres) of estate, to Lancashire mill-owner Sir Amos Nelson in 1923.

The stables of the house survive, converted into an estate office and house. They were also built about 1770, and probably by John Carr. The building is grade II* listed under the name Old Gledstone. Its exterior is in stone, the courtyard is in brick, and it has a hipped slate roof. It has two storeys, the exterior is square in plan, and the interior is circular. The main range has nine bays, with a central round-headed entry, flanked by arcades containing windows. The third and seventh bays project under pediments. On the upper floor are square windows, and on the roof is a clock on a square base, surmounted by a hemispherical dome, and on open colonnade of twelve Doric columns with a ball and a weathervane. In the courtyard is a continuous arcade of 16 elliptical arches with stone bases and imposts.

=== Gledstone Hall ===
The existing building was designed for Sir Amos Nelson by Edwin Lutyens and built between 1925 and 1927. The previous house was demolished in 1928. The gardens were laid out c.1930 by Gertrude Jekyll. Sir Amos died in 1947 and his young wife in 1966. It was converted into a nursing home for some time (but which failed in 1991) and was bought by Margaret Francis, the widow of artist Sam Francis. She has commissioned a total refurbishment of the building.

The house is built of sandstone with a Cotswold stone slate roof. It has two storeys and an entrance front of 13 bays, the end bays being pavilions. The middle three bays project and form a full-height portico, distyle in antis, with a pediment. The doorway has consoles, and the windows are casements. The garden front has eleven bays and contains two colonnades of Doric columns in antis. The main block is linked by walls to two separate pavilions that define the rectangular forecourt. At the north of the forecourt are ornamental wrought iron gates with an overthrow, flanked by four large piers with urns.

There is a terrace parallel to the house, with two arms at right angles flanking a long pool. At the end, steps lead down to a lower terrace with two pergolas, each with 16 stone piers. On the eastern side is a pergola with twelve piers, and at the end of the pool is a segmental arch and a vault with a keystone. The terraces are contemporary with the house and are separately grade II* listed. They were designed by Lutyens and Gertrude Jekyll.

== See also ==
- Grade II* listed buildings in North Yorkshire (district)
- Listed buildings in Martons Both
