= Burnaby Drayson =

British politician (1913–1983)

George Burnaby Drayson (9 March 1913 – 16 September 1983) was a British Conservative Party politician.

Drayson was educated at Borlase School and was a company director and a member of the London Stock Exchange 1935–54. During World War II he served in the Western Desert with the Royal Artillery and was taken prisoner. He escaped in September 1943, and walked 500 miles, with a companion, through Axis-occupied Italy from north to south. He was a member of the Royal Agricultural Society and the Livestock Export Council of Great Britain.

Drayson was member of parliament for Skipton from 1945 to 1979, preceding John Watson. Drayson saw off strong Liberal Party challenges to his position. He came closest to losing in the October 1974 general election to the ebullient, local Liberal candidate Claire Brooks just holding on with the narrow majority of 590 (1.4%).

Parliament of the United Kingdom
Preceded by Hugh McDowall Lawson	Member of Parliament for Skipton; 1945–1979	Succeeded by John Watson
