= East Marton =

Village in North Yorkshire, England

Coordinates: 53°57′15″N 2°08′29″W

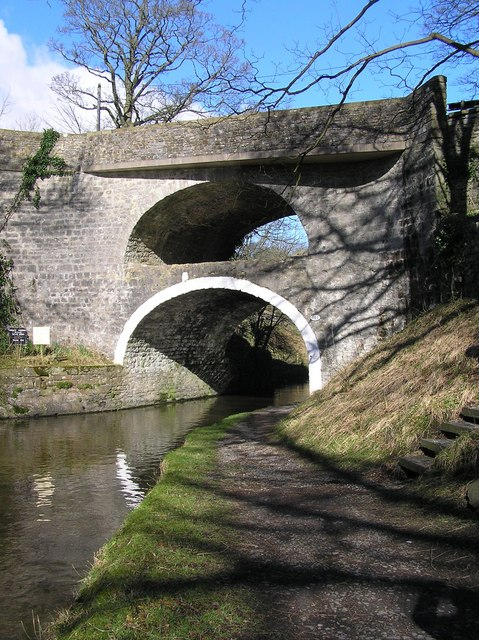
- The double-arched bridge at East Marton over the Leeds and Liverpool Canal

- Location within North Yorkshire
- OS grid reference: SD908509
- Civil parish: Martons Both
- Unitary authority: North Yorkshire
- Ceremonial county: North Yorkshire
- Region: Yorkshire and the Humber
- Country: England
- Sovereign state: United Kingdom
- Post town: SKIPTON
- Postcode district: BD23
- Police: North Yorkshire
- Fire: North Yorkshire
- Ambulance: Yorkshire
- UK Parliament: Skipton and Ripon

East Marton is a village in the county of North Yorkshire, England.

== Village ==
It is situated approximately 5 miles (8 km) west of the market town of Skipton and is on the A59 road. The Leeds and Liverpool Canal passes through the village on the descent from Foulridge to Leeds. The canal towpath in the village is part of the Pennine Way.

There is an interesting Grade II listed double-arch bridge built around 1790, which carries the A59 over the canal. Because such structures are unusual, many sources for example assume that the lower arch was built first and the second arch later. However Historic England's listing suggests that both arches are contemporaneous, and that the lower arch is a strainer arch. Strainer arches, acting as a reinforcement device, are quite common in cathedrals but rare in bridges, thence the confusion.

The canal was fully opened in 1816 with the section through East Marton being started in 1793. Some of the Navvies who died of smallpox whilst constructing the canal are buried in the churchyard.

St Peter's Church, East Marton, was first built during Norman times to replace an earlier Saxon church in the village. St Peter's has been added to in the 17th and 19th centuries.

There is a TV transmission mast just north of the village.

Together with West Marton it forms the civil parish of Martons Both and in the 2011 census the population was listed as 213.

East Marton was an ancient parish, sometimes known as Church Marton or Marton in Craven, in Staincliffe Wapentake in the West Riding of Yorkshire. From 1974 to 2023 it was part of the Craven District, it is now administered by the unitary North Yorkshire Council.

== See also ==
- Listed buildings in Martons Both
