= West Marton =

Village in North Yorkshire, England

Coordinates: 53°57′03″N 2°09′50″W

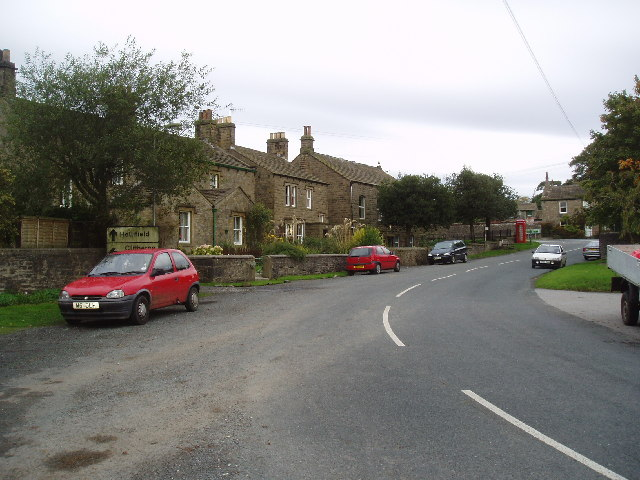
- West Marton village

- Location within North Yorkshire
- OS grid reference: SD893504
- Civil parish: Martons Both
- Unitary authority: North Yorkshire
- Ceremonial county: North Yorkshire
- Region: Yorkshire and the Humber
- Country: England
- Sovereign state: United Kingdom
- Post town: Skipton
- Postcode district: BD23
- Police: North Yorkshire
- Fire: North Yorkshire
- Ambulance: Yorkshire
- UK Parliament: Skipton and Ripon

West Marton is a village in the county of North Yorkshire, England. It is on the A59 road about 6.5 miles (10.5 km) west of the market town of Skipton, and 8 miles (13 km) north of Colne.

Until 1974 it was part of the West Riding of Yorkshire. From 1974 to 2023 it was part of the Craven District, it is now administered by the unitary North Yorkshire Council.

== History ==
Marton is mentioned in the Domesday Book as belonging to Gospatric (son of Arnketil) and having two villagers. Historical forms of the name have been recorded as Martun, Marton in Craven, and Bothe Martons. The name derives from the Old English of mere tūn, a farm near a pool. Sometime in the 12th century, the mill at Marton was donated to the religious house of Bolton Priory, (Embsay) before it moved to the place now known as Bolton Abbey.

West Marton has a village Hall and a shop which doubles up as a post office. To the south of the village is Gledstone Hall, which is a grade II* listed building. The current building, designed by Edwin Lutyens, was built in 1923, replacing an earlier structure designed by John Carr of York.

Together with East Marton it forms the civil parish of Martons Both. At the 2011 Census, the parish of Martons Both had 213 residents.

== See also ==
- Listed buildings in Martons Both
