= David Curry =

British Conservative Party politician (born 1944)

The Right Honourable David Curry
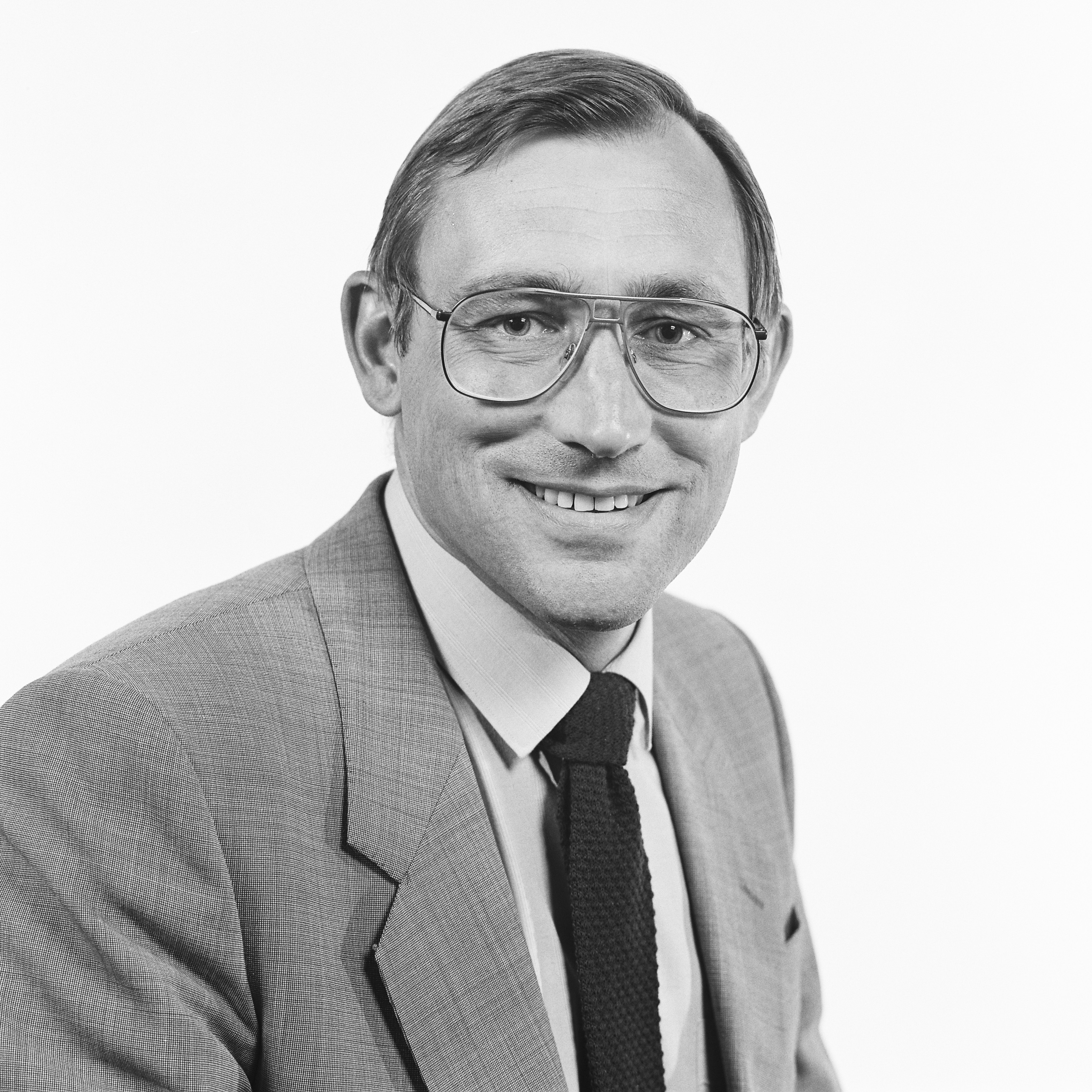

Chairman of the Standards and Privileges Committee
- In office 20 October – 19 November 2009
- Preceded by: Sir George Young
- Succeeded by: Sir Malcolm Rifkind

Shadow Secretary of State for Local and Devolved Government Affairs
- In office 11 November 2003 – 15 March 2004
- Leader: Michael Howard
- Preceded by: David Davis (Office of the Deputy Prime Minister)
- Succeeded by: Caroline Spelman

Chairman of the Environment, Food and Rural Affairs Select Committee
- In office 16 July 2001 – 12 November 2003
- Preceded by: Position established
- Succeeded by: Michael Jack

Chairman of the Agriculture Select Committee
- In office 15 February 2000 – 11 May 2001
- Preceded by: Peter Luff
- Succeeded by: Position abolished

Shadow Minister of Agriculture, Fisheries and Food
- In office 11 June 1997 – 3 November 1997
- Leader: William Hague
- Preceded by: Douglas Hogg
- Succeeded by: Michael Jack

Minister of State for Local Government
- In office 27 May 1993 – 2 May 1997
- Leader: John Major
- Preceded by: John Redwood
- Succeeded by: Hilary Armstrong

Minister of State for Agriculture, Fisheries and Food
- In office 14 April 1992 – 27 May 1993
- Leader: John Major
- Preceded by: Jean Barker
- Succeeded by: Michael Jack

Parliamentary Secretary to the Ministry of Agriculture, Fisheries and Food
- In office 26 July 1989 – 14 April 1992
- Leader: Margaret Thatcher; John Major
- Preceded by: Richard Ryder
- Succeeded by: Frederick Curzon

Member of Parliament for Skipton and Ripon
- In office 11 June 1987 – 12 April 2010
- Preceded by: John Watson
- Succeeded by: Julian Smith

Member of the European Parliament for Essex North East
- In office 7 June 1979 – 15 June 1989
- Preceded by: Position established
- Succeeded by: Anne McIntosh

Personal details
- Born: 13 June 1944 (age 82) Burton-on-Trent, England
- Party: Conservative
- Spouse: Anne Helene Maud Roullet
- Education: Corpus Christi College, Oxford; Harvard Kennedy School

David Maurice Curry (born 13 June 1944) is a British Conservative Party politician. He was the Member of Parliament (MP) for Skipton and Ripon from 1987 to 2010.

== Early life ==
Curry, the son of teachers, was educated at the Ripon Grammar School where he was head boy in 1962, and then at Corpus Christi College, Oxford where he received a bachelor's degree in modern history in 1966. He also attended the Harvard Kennedy School at Harvard University as a Kennedy Scholar. He began his career as a reporter on the Newcastle Journal in 1966. In 1970, he became the world trade editor at the Financial Times where he remained until he was elected to the European Parliament. In 1977, he founded the Paris Conservative Association.

== Political career ==
Curry contested the safe Labour seat of Morpeth at the February 1974 general election, but was beaten by the sitting Labour MP George Grant by 13,034 votes. The two met again at the October 1974 general election, when Grant won by 14,687 votes.

Curry was elected a Member of the European Parliament in 1979 for Essex North East. He served until 1989.

Curry was elected to the House of Commons for the safe Conservative seat of Skipton and Ripon at the 1987 general election on the retirement of the sitting Conservative MP John Watson. Curry won the seat with a majority of 17,174 and held the seat safely until he retired from Parliament in 2010.

Following his election Curry became a member of the Agriculture Select Committee until he was promoted to the government of Margaret Thatcher in 1989 as Parliamentary Under Secretary of State at the Ministry of Agriculture, Fisheries and Food. He was promoted within the same department to Minister of State after the 1992 general election by John Major. Two year later he moved sideways to the Department for the Environment where he remained until the Major government fell at the 1997 general election. He became a Member of the Privy Council in 1996.

In opposition Curry became the Shadow Agriculture Secretary, but resigned from the Shadow Cabinet in December 1997 in protest at the policy of ruling out Britain joining the single European currency for the next ten years. In 1998, he became the chairman of the Agriculture Select Committee and, after the 2001 general election, its successor the Environment, Food and Rural Affairs Select Committee until 2003 when he promoted again to the Shadow Cabinet by Michael Howard as Shadow Local and Devolved Government Secretary. He resigned again in 2004, this time citing 'family reasons' and was replaced by Caroline Spelman. He was a member of the Public Accounts Select Committee from 2004.

On 5 February 2009, Curry announced that he would not stand at the 2010 election.

On 19 November 2009, Curry stood down from his position as chairman of the Parliamentary Committee on Standards and Privileges after claims by The Daily Telegraph regarding his expenses and reportedly referred himself to the Independent Parliamentary Standards Authority for investigation.

In January 2013, Curry was appointed editor-in-chief of The Parliamentary Review.

== Publications ==
- The Food War: US-EU Food Politics by David Curry, 1982, EDG
- The Conservative Tradition in Europe Edited by David Curry, 1998, Mainstream
- Lobbying Government: A practical Guide for the Housing Industry and Lobby by David Curry, 1999, Chartered Institute of Housing, ISBN 1-900396-48-3
- The Sorcerers Apprentice: Government and Globalisation by David Curry, 2000, Local Government Association, ISBN 1-84049-161-2

Parliament of the United Kingdom
Preceded by John Watson	Member of Parliament for Skipton and Ripon; 1987–2010	Succeeded by Julian Smith
Political offices
Preceded by Douglas Hogg	Shadow Minister of Agriculture, Fisheries and Food; 1997	Succeeded by Michael Jack
Preceded by David Davis as Shadow Secretary of State for the Office of the Deputy Prime Minister	Shadow Secretary of State for Local and Devolved Government Affairs; 2003–2004	Succeeded by Caroline Spelman
