= St Peter's Church, East Marton =

Church in East Marton, North Yorkshire, England

Coordinates: 53°57′08″N 2°08′30″W

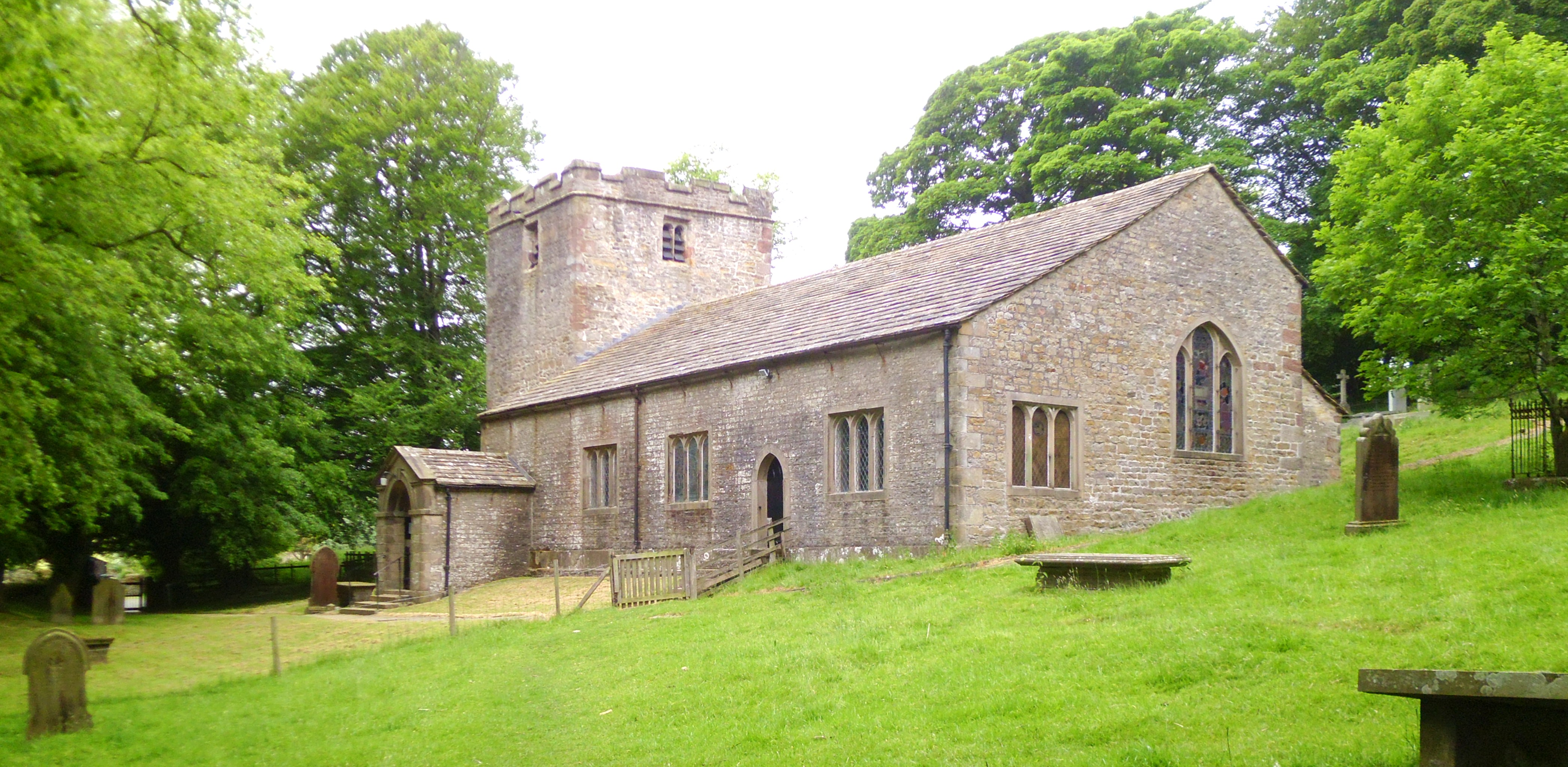
The church, in 2013

St Peter's Church is the parish church of East Marton, a village in North Yorkshire, in England.

The church was built in the 12th century, from which period the tower survives. The nave and chancel were rebuilt, probably in the 16th century, then the south aisle was rebuilt and the porch was added in 1769. The church was grade II* listed in 1954.

The church is built of stone and has a slate roof. It consists of a nave, a south aisle, a chancel and a west tower. The tower is Norman, it contains small round-headed windows, small two-light bell openings, and an embattled parapet. The porch has a round-arched doorway with impost blocks and a triple keystone, and a pediment. Inside, there is an early font, and part of a carved pillar which was relocated from St Helen's Well in Thorp Arch.

== See also ==
- Grade II* listed churches in North Yorkshire (district)
- Listed buildings in Martons Both
