= Listed buildings in Martons Both =

Martons Both is a civil parish in the county of North Yorkshire, England. It contains 42 listed buildings that are recorded in the National Heritage List for England. Of these, five are listed at Grade II*, the middle of the three grades, and the others are at Grade II, the lowest grade. The parish contains the villages of East Marton and West Marton, and the surrounding countryside. The Leeds and Liverpool Canal passes through the parish, and five bridges crossing it are listed. One of the more important buildings in the parish is Gledstone Hall, which is listed together with a number of associated structures. Most of the other listed buildings are houses, cottages and associated structures, farmhouses and farm buildings, and the others include a church, a public house, three milestones, a set of stocks, a road bridge, a boundary stone, and a former lead smelting mill.

== Key ==
Grade	Criteria
II*	Particularly important buildings of more than special interest
II	Buildings of national importance and special interest

== Buildings ==
Name and location	Photograph	Date	Notes	Grade
St Peter's Church; 53.95229°N 2.14157°W		12th century	The church has been altered and extended though the centuries, particularly in 1769. It is built in stone and has a slate roof. It consists of a nave, a south aisle, a chancel and a west tower. The tower is Norman, it contains small round-headed windows, small two-light bell openings, and an embattled parapet. The porch has a round-arched doorway with impost blocks and a triple keystone, and a pediment.	II*
Marton Hall Cottages and Marton Priory; 53.94833°N 2.16221°W		c. 1600	The remains of a manor house and a barn converted into three dwellings, in stone, with a stone slate roof and two storeys. The left part has three bays, and contains mullioned and sash windows. The former barn has five bays. The left bay has quoins, and contains a segmental arch with a chamfered surround. There are similar arches in the middle and right bays with inserted windows, and between them are mullioned windows. The upper floor contains mullioned windows in the outer and middle bays, and pitching holes between.	II
Sawley House; 53.95577°N 2.13921°W		Early 17th century (probable)	A farmhouse in stone with a stone slate roof, two storeys and five bays. In the left bay is a doorway with a plain surround, the next bay contains a doorway with a chamfered surround and a Tudor arched head, infilled with a window, and further to the right is a porch. Most of the windows are mullioned, the lights of one with pointed heads.	II
Box Tree Cottage; 53.95576°N 2.13921°W		17th century	A farmhouse in stone with a stone slate roof. There are two storeys, four bays, and a rear wing. The doorway has an architrave, a pulvinated frieze and a cornice. On the ground floor are three two-light mullioned windows with sashes, and a single light, and the upper floor contains sash windows in architraves. In the rear wing is a Tudor arched doorway.	II
Marton Scar Farmhouse; 53.95857°N 2.17838°W	—	Mid-17th century	The farmhouse is in stone with quoins and a stone slate roof. There are two storeys and three bays. The doorway has a chamfered surround and a wooden hood. The windows are mullioned, those on the ground floor with hood moulds.	II
Ingthorpe Grange; 53.96425°N 2.16516°W		1672	The house, which was extended in the 19th century, is in stone with a stone-slate roof, two storeys and an attic, and a front of three gabled bays with ball finials. On the front is a full-height gabled porch with a ball finial. It contains a round-arched doorway with a chamfered surround, above which is a string course, an initialled datestone, a three-light chamfered window with a pediment-like panel containing an inscription, and a small round-headed window. Elsewhere, the windows are mullioned, those in the attic are stepped, and they all have hood moulds.	II*
22 Gledestone Road; 53.95026°N 2.16330°W		Late 17th century	A house on a corner site, later a house and a shop, in stone with a stone slate roof. There are two storeys, three bays, and a rear cross-wing. On the front are two doorways, the left one with a chamfered surround. Most of the windows on the front are mullioned, and there is also a small round-headed window. In the left return are 19th-century windows.	II
Crickle Farmhouse; 53.95155°N 2.13065°W		Late 17th century	The farmhouse is in stone with a stone slate roof. There are three storeys, and fronts of three and one bay. In the centre is a three-storey porch containing a doorway with moulded jambs and an elliptical head, and in the gable is a plaque. The windows are mullioned.	II
Mire House Farmhouse; 53.95489°N 2.16583°W	—	Late 17th century	The farmhouse is pebbledashed and has a stone slate roof. There are two storeys and four bays. On the front are two doorways with chamfered surrounds, and the windows are mullioned. Over the ground floor openings is a continuous hood mould, and in the right gable end are quoins.	II
Skelda Farmhouse; 53.95649°N 2.18280°W	—	1697	The farmhouse is in stone with a stone slate roof, two storeys and attics, and three bays. In the centre is a porch with an elliptical-arched doorway, and above it is a dated and initialled plaque. Most of the windows are sashes, and in the attic are two two-light mullioned windows.	II
The Cottage, shop and barn 53.95461°N 2.14145°W		1698	The building is in stone with a stone slate roof. The house and shop have two storeys and four bays. The doorway has a segmental head, and above it is a moulded plaque with initials and the date. The windows are mullioned, with some mullions missing. Above the ground floor openings is a continuous hood mould, rising over the plaque. The barn to the right is simple, it contains a straight-headed cart entry, and in the gable end is a doorway with a chamfered surround.	II
Bale House, stable and barn 53.95114°N 2.16435°W	—	1700 (probable)	The house is in stone with rusticated quoins and a stone slate roof. There are two storeys and five bays. The windows are cross windows with moulded architraves and square mullions. Attached to the right side is a former gabled stable and a dovecote, with chamfered openings. Further attached is a 19th-century barn with a segmental cart entry and a re-set datestone.	II
Yew Tree Farmhouse; 53.95116°N 2.16370°W	—	c. 1700	The house is in stone with a stone slate roof. There are two storeys and four bays. The doorway has a plain surround, and the windows are mullioned, those on the ground floor double-chamfered.	II
Sundial, Gledstone Hall; 53.95717°N 2.17415°W	—	1748	The sundial, which has been moved from elsewhere, is in the centre of the staircase to the lower terrace. It is in sandstone and is cubital. Each face has a different inscription.	II
15 and 16 Gledestone Road; 53.95162°N 2.16428°W	—	Mid-18th century (possible)	The house is in rendered stone and has a stone slate roof. There are two storeys and three bays. The central doorway has a plain surround, and the windows are mullioned, with three lights on the ground floor and two on the upper floor.	II
Cross Keys Public House; 53.95433°N 2.14108°W		Mid-18th century (probable)	The public house is in stone with a stone slate roof. There are two storeys and four bays, and three bays added to the right. On the front is a gabled porch, and the windows are sashes, three on the upper floor with mullions.	II
Milestone at junction with A59 road 53.95507°N 2.14553°W		Mid-18th century (probable)	The milestone at the junction of Ingthorpe Lane with the A59 road is in sandstone, and has a rounded top. The main face is inscribed with a pointing hand and the distances to Skipton and Gisburn, and on the side facing the lane is the distance to Settle.	II
Mire House Barn; 53.95506°N 2.16589°W	—	18th century (probable)	The barn is in stone with a stone slate roof. It contains a low segmental-arched cart entry.	II
Stocks; 53.94981°N 2.16326°W		18th century (probable)	The stocks, which have been restored, consist of two stone uprights an ankle board and a wooden closer.	II
The Estate House; 53.95024°N 2.16367°W	—	18th century (probable)	The house is in stone with a stone slate roof, hipped on the right. There are two storeys and three bays. The central doorway has an architrave, a pulvinated frieze and a cornice, and the windows are sashes in architraves. Attached at the rear are stables with two entries, one with an inscribed and dated keystone.	II
Old Gledstone; 53.95305°N 2.17986°W	—	c. 1770	This is the stable block to the original Gledstone Hall, its exterior is in stone, the courtyard is in brick, and it has a hipped slate roof. There are two storeys, the exterior is square in plan, and the interior is circular. The main range has nine bays, with a central round-headed entry, flanked by arcades containing windows. The third and seventh bays project under pediments. On the upper floor are square windows, and on the roof is a clock on a square base, surmounted by a hemispherical dome, and on open colonnade of twelve Doric columns with a ball and a weathervane. In the courtyard is a continuous arcade of 16 elliptical arches with stone bases and imposts.	II*
Church Farmhouse; 53.95340°N 2.14398°W		Late 18th century	The farmhouse is in stone with a stone slate roof. There are two storeys and three bays. The doorway is in the centre, the ground floor windows have two lights and mullions, and those on the upper floor have single lights.	II
School House Farmhouse; 53.95308°N 2.15496°W	—	Late 18th century	The farmhouse is in stone with a stone slate roof, two storeys and three bays. The doorway has a heavy lintel, and the windows are mullioned.	II
Tempest Farmhouse; 53.95462°N 2.14219°W		Late 18th century	The farmhouse is in stone with a stone slate roof, three storeys and five bays. In the centre is a gabled porch and a doorway with an architrave. The windows are sashes in architraves.	II
The Summerhouse; 53.95382°N 2.17763°W	—	Late 18th century (probable)	The summerhouse is in stone with a cornice and a hipped slate roof. The plan is of an elongated octagon, the three south-facing fronts treated as an arcade with imposts. Rooms have been added at the rear to convert it into a cottage.	II
South Field Bridge; 53.93959°N 2.15744°W		c. 1790	The bridge, No. 159 on the Leeds and Liverpool Canal, carries Gledstone Road over the canal. It is in stone, and consists of a single elliptical arch. The bridge has a band, a solid parapet and curving abutments.	II
Old Hall Bridge; 53.95142°N 2.13999°W		c. 1790	The bridge, No. 160 on the Leeds and Liverpool Canal, is an accommodation bridge over the canal. It is in stone, and consists of a single elliptical arch. The bridge has a band, a solid parapet and curving abutments.	II
Double Arched Bridge; 53.95372°N 2.13986°W		c. 1790	The bridge, No. 161 on the Leeds and Liverpool Canal, carries the A59 road over the canal. It is in stone, and consists of two round arches, one above the other, and has short curved parapet walls. The lower arch is a strainer arch.	II
Williamson Bridge; 53.95561°N 2.13821°W		c. 1790	The bridge, No. 162 on the Leeds and Liverpool Canal, carries Bank Newtonover the canal. It is in stone, and consists of a single elliptical arch. The bridge has a band, a solid parapet and curving abutments.	II
Langber Bridge; 53.95973°N 2.13850°W		c. 1790	The bridge, No. 163 on the Leeds and Liverpool Canal, is an accommodation bridge over the canal. It is in stone, and consists of a single elliptical arch. The bridge has a band, a solid parapet and curving abutments.	II
Kennels House and Cottage; 53.95109°N 2.18330°W	—	c. 1795	The house is in stone with a hipped slate roof. There are two storeys, and the ground floor is treated as a five-bay arcade with an impost band. The middle three bays form a loggia with brick vaults, the central one with a doorway and the outer ones with windows, all with fanlights. In the middle of the upper floor is a lunette, and this is flanked by small square casements.	II
The Dovecote; 53.95071°N 2.18366°W	—	1795	Initially probably kennels, later a dovecote, it is in stone. There are effectively two storeys and three bays. In the centre is a straight-headed door flanked by round-headed openings, all reached by steps. The upper floor contains three circular openings. In the right return is a round-arched opening and a circular opening above.	II
Marton House; 53.95478°N 2.14525°W	—	c. 1800	The house, later divided, is in stone, partly rendered, with a stone slate roof. There are two storeys and four bays. The left two bays have quoins. On the ground floor are three-light windows with Ionic pilasters as mullions, in segmental arches. The upper floor contains tripartite windows with plain mullions, and in the right two bays are plain windows.	II
Langber Farm; 53.94422°N 2.14472°W	—	Late 18th or early 19th century	A farmhouse and a barn combined into a house, in stone, with a roof of slate and stone slate. There are two storeys and three bays. On the front is a doorway, and to its left on each floor is a two-light mullioned window.	II
Crickle Bridge; 53.95140°N 2.12916°W		Early 19th century (probable)	The bridge carries the A59 road over Crickle Beck. It is in stone, and consists of a single segmental arch. The stonework of the spandrels radiates from the arch, and the parapets are solid.	II
Boundary stone, Crickle Bridge; 53.95134°N 2.12912°W		Mid-19th century (probable)	The parish boundary stone is on the south side of Crickle Bridge. It has a double-rounded top and is divided vertically by a scored line. The left side is inscribed "E S BROUGHTON" and the right side "H D MARTON".	II
Milestone near School House Farmhouse; 53.95336°N 2.15274°W		Mid-19th century	The milestone is on the north side of the A59 road. It is in cast iron, and has a triangular plan and a rounded top. On the top is inscribed "SKIPTON & CLITHEROE ROAD" and "MARTONS BOTH". On the left side is the distance to Skipton, and on the right side to Clitheroe.	II
Milestone opposite Crickle Farmhouse; 53.95170°N 2.13044°W		Mid-19th century	The milestone is on the north side of the A59 road. It is in cast iron, and has a triangular plan and a rounded top. On the top is inscribed "SKIPTON & CLITHEROE ROAD" and "MARTONS BOTH". On the left side is the distance to Skipton, and on the right side to Clitheroe.	II
Gledstone Hall, walls, pavilions and gates 53.95732°N 2.17424°W		1922–26	A large house, designed by Edwin Lutyens, in sandstone with a Cotswold stone slate roof. There are two storeys and an entrance front of 13 bays, the end bays being pavilions. The middle three bays project and form a full-height portico, distyle in antis, with a pediment. The doorway has consoles, and the windows are casements. The garden front has eleven bays and contains two colonnades of Doric columns in antis. The main block is linked by walls to two separate pavilions that define the rectangular forecourt. At the north of the forecourt are ornamental wrought iron gates with an overthrow, flanked by four large piers with urns.	II*
North Lodge; 53.95825°N 2.17687°W	—	1923	A lodge to Gledstone Hall, designed by Edwin Lutyens, it is in stone with a stone slate roof. There are two storeys and an L-shaped plan, with a porch in the angle. The windows are mullioned.	II
South Lodge; 53.95498°N 2.17346°W		1923	A lodge to Gledstone Hall, designed by Edwin Lutyens, it is in stone with a sill band and a hipped stone slate roof. There are two storeys and three bays. The central doorway has a pediment on consoles with carved initials in the tympanum. The door is flanked by small square windows with ornamental circular fixed glazing, and the upper floor contains casement windows.	II
Terraces at Gledstone Hall; 53.95704°N 2.17380°W	—	1923	The terraces and other structures were designed by Edwin Lutyens with Gertrude Jekyll. There is a terrace parallel to the house, with two arms at right angles flanking a long pool. At the end, steps lead down to a lower terrace with two pergolas, each with 16 stone piers. On the eastern side is a pergola with twelve piers, and at the end of the pool is a segmental arch and a vault with a keystone.	II*
