= The Parliamentary Review =

- Chairmen: Eric Pickles and David Blunkett
- Chief Editor: David Curry
- Founder and Director: Daniel Yossman
- Director: Craig Wilmann
- Circulation: Around 500,000 annually
- Founded: 2010
- First issue: July 2012
- Final issue: Ongoing
- Company: Westminster Publications
- Country: United Kingdom, Australia
- Based in: Victoria, London, England
- Language: English
- Website: theparliamentaryreview.co.uk

The Parliamentary Review is a British pay-to-publish journal, with organisations having to write their own copy and pay £3,500 for it to be published.

The journal is owned by Westminster Publications Ltd, a for-profit venture that is not affiliated with Parliament or the UK government.

== History ==
It was established in 2012 by Daniel Yossman, then a 23-year-old graduate in Russian and business management from the University of Manchester. Eric Pickles was appointed chairman of the publication in 2017, and former home secretary David Blunkett was appointed as co-chair in 2018.

Previous editions have featured forewords from high-profile politicians such as prime ministers Theresa May and David Cameron alongside chancellor Philip Hammond and secretaries of state Esther McVey, Michael Gove, Chris Grayling, Gavin Williamson and Damian Hinds. The review also regularly features forewords from the chief executives of industry-leading trade bodies, such as TechUK, the British Retail Consortium, the Federation of Master Builders, EEF and the British Property Federation.

The Parliamentary Review sends letters inviting organisations to be represented in the publication. It has received criticism for the charges, sometimes up to £4,000, that are made to some of the organisations that take them up on the invitation, as well as for implying that it has links to parliament. This criticism has been highlighted by articles in the national press, including The Daily Mirror, The Times, and Schools Week.

In particular, the publication and its publishers have been accused of misleading headteachers of schools across England. School leaders have reported being led to believe they were being singled-out for commendation for their good work, but were then asked to stump up thousands of pounds to be featured.

In 2019, the Advertising Standards Authority investigated three issues raised against The Parliamentary Review and on 6 November 2019 upheld the complaints. They concluded that the letters sent to businesses were not clearly identifiable as a marketing communication and that they were misleading in that they gave the impression of being an official government publication. Furthermore, they concluded that the articles within The Parliamentary Review were advertorials that should have been labelled as advertising.
