= Hugh Lawson (British politician) =

British politician (1912–1997)

Hugh McDowall Lawson (13 February 1912 – 23 March 1997) was a politician in the United Kingdom's short-lived Common Wealth Party, which was founded to contest parliamentary by-elections during World War II.

He was elected to the House of Commons as Member of Parliament (MP) for Skipton at a by-election in January 1944, then contested Harrow West in the 1945 general election, where he lost. Lawson later contested the Rushcliffe constituency in Nottinghamshire in 1950 for the Labour Party, but was not elected; he likewise was unsuccessful in standing for the King's Lynn seat in Norfolk in 1955.

His sister was Faith Lawson, a housing officer and campaigner, and chairman of the Pedestrians Association from 1991 to 1997.

== Sources ==
- Craig, F. W. S. (1983) [1969]. British parliamentary election results 1918-1949 (3rd ed.). Chichester: Parliamentary Research Services. ISBN 0-900178-06-X.
- Leigh Rayment's Historical List of MPs

Parliament of the United Kingdom
Preceded by George William Rickards	Member of Parliament for Skipton; 1944–1945	Succeeded by Burnaby Drayson
