= Baron Darwen =

Barony in the Peerage of the United Kingdom

Baron Darwen, of Heys-in-Bowland in the West Riding of the County of York, is a title in the Peerage of the United Kingdom. It was created on 12 February 1946 for John Davies, a prominent cotton manufacturer. He served as a Lord-in-waiting (government whip in the House of Lords) from 1949 to 1950 in the Labour administration of Clement Attlee. As of 2011 the title is held by his great-grandson, the fourth Baron, who succeeded his father in 2011.

== Barons Darwen (1946) ==
- John Percival Davies, 1st Baron Darwen (1885–1950)
- Cedric Percival Davies, 2nd Baron Darwen (1915–1988)
- Roger Michael Davies, 3rd Baron Darwen (1938–2011)
- Paul Davies, 4th Baron Darwen (b. 1962)

The heir apparent is the present holder's elder son, Hon. Oscar Kamen Davies (b. 1996)
