= 1933 Skipton by-election =

UK parliamentary by-election

The 1933 Skipton by-election was a parliamentary by-election for the British House of Commons constituency of Skipton on 7 November 1933.

== Vacancy ==
The by-election was caused by the death of the sitting Conservative MP, Ernest Roy Bird on 27 September 1933. He had been MP here since holding the seat in 1924.

== Election history ==
Skipton had been won by the Conservatives at every election since 1918 and was a safe seat. The result at the last General election was as follows;

1931 general election: Skipton
Party	Candidate	Votes	%	±%
Conservative	Ernest Roy Bird	28,013	68.2	+28.7
Labour	John Davies	13,053	31.8	+0.6
Majority		14,960	36.4	+28.1
Turnout		41,066	80.3	−3.1
Conservative hold		Swing		

== Candidates ==
The local Conservatives selected 56-year-old George William Rickards a silk manufacturer. He had been a member of the West Riding County Council since 1928 but had not before stood for parliament.

The Labour Party re-selected John Davies who had stood here in 1929 and 1931, finishing second both times. He was a cotton manufacturer from Lancashire.

The Liberals had not fielded a candidate since 1929 when they came third. They selected a new candidate, Robert Coventry Denby, a 48 year old Bradford solicitor.

The Communists, who had not stood here before, selected first time candidate James Rushton.

== Main issues and campaign ==
Foreign Affairs dominated the campaign, particularly the Conservative dominated National Government's isolationist approach. The Labour candidate, Davies, claimed to be a pacifist and argued for unilateral disarmament.

The Liberals criticised the Conservatives for not looking to work with the League of Nations to achieve disarmament and criticised Labour for calling for unilateral disarmament. R.C. Denby, the Liberal candidate, gave a speech reported in the Guardian on 3 November, in which he outlined his and his party's position on disarmament and the League of Nations; "We have not convinced the world that we are really sincere in our desire for disarmament. For one thing, they can point to our reservation of bombing from the air. While, in the present circumstances, any further large-scale disarmament can only come by international agreement, I believe that if we had a strong Liberal Government we should give such a lead as would influence other Powers and get them to agree on a wider measure of disarmament."

== Result ==
Despite a large swing against the National Government, the Conservative managed to hold on to the seat.

Skipton by-election, 1933
Party	Candidate	Votes	%	±%
Conservative	George William Rickards	18,136	43.0	−25.2
Labour	John Davies	14,157	33.5	+1.7
Liberal	Robert Coventry Denby	9,219	21.8	+21.8
Communist	James Rushton	704	1.7	New
Majority		3,979	9.5	−26.9
Turnout		42,216	82.7	+2.4
Conservative hold		Swing	-13.5	

== Aftermath ==
Rickards continued to sit as MP until he died in 1943. Davies continued to stand as Labour candidate here without success until 1946 when Prime Minister Clement Attlee gave him a seat in the House of Lords. Neither Denby or Rushton stood for parliament again. A Peace Ballot was launched in 1934 to ascertain public support for the League of Nations and collective security. As a result, just before the 1935 general election, the National Government agreed to the Liberal policy of working through the League of Nations. The result at the following General election;

General election 1935: Skipton
Party	Candidate	Votes	%	±%
Conservative	George William Rickards	22,847	56.2	+13.2
Labour	John Davies	17,788	43.8	+10.3
Majority		5,059	12.4	+2.9
Turnout		40,635	79.6	−3.1
Conservative hold		Swing		

== See also ==
- List of United Kingdom by-elections
- United Kingdom by-election records
