= Skipton (constituency) =

Parliamentary constituency in the United Kingdom, 1885–1983

- Former county constituency for the House of Commons
- Boundary of Skipton in the West Riding of Yorkshire, 1974–1983
- County: West Riding of Yorkshire
- Major settlements: Skipton

1885–1983
- Seats: One
- Created from: Northern West Riding of Yorkshire
- Replaced by: Skipton & Ripon, Pendle, Ribble Valley Westmorland & Lonsdale and Keighley

Skipton was a county constituency centred on the town of Skipton in Yorkshire which returned one Member of Parliament (MP) to the House of Commons of the Parliament of the United Kingdom.

It was created for the 1885 general election, and abolished nearly a hundred years later, for the 1983 general election. It was then partly replaced by the new Skipton and Ripon constituency.

== Boundaries ==
1885–1918: Part of the Wapentake of Skipton and Ewecross.

1918–1950: The Urban Districts of Barnoldswick, Earby, and Skipton, and the Rural Districts of Bowland, Sedbergh, Settle, and Skipton.

1950–1983: The Urban Districts of Barnoldswick, Earby, and Skipton, the Rural Districts of Bowland, Sedbergh, and Settle, and the Rural District of Skipton except the parishes of Steeton with Eastburn, and Sutton.

In 1974 the rural district of Sedbergh became part of the new county of Cumbria.

== Members of Parliament ==
Election	Member	Party
1885	Mathew Wilson	Liberal
1886	Walter Morrison	Liberal Unionist
1892	Charles Savile Roundell	Liberal
1895	Walter Morrison	Liberal Unionist
1900	Frederick Whitley-Thomson	Liberal
1906	William Clough	Liberal
1918	Richard Roundell	Conservative
1924	Ernest Bird	Conservative
1933 by-election	George Rickards	Conservative
1944 by-election	Hugh Lawson	Common Wealth
1945	Burnaby Drayson	Conservative
1979	John Watson	Conservative
1983	constituency abolished: see Skipton & Ripon	

== Elections ==
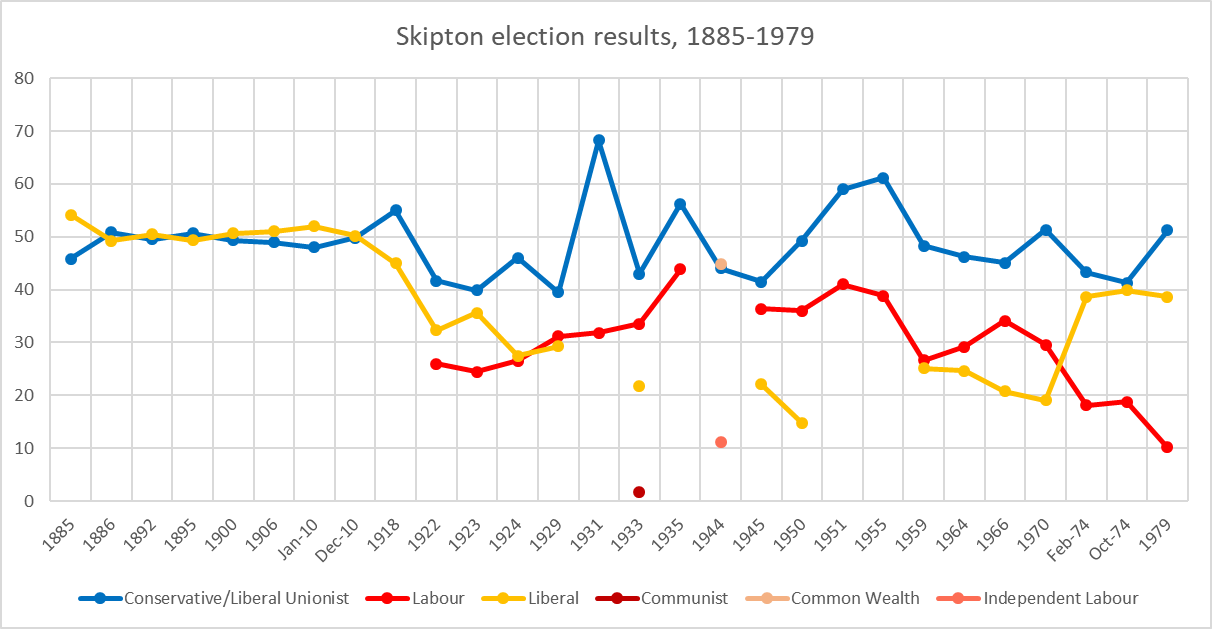
Skipton election results

=== Elections in the 1880s ===
General election 1885: Skipton
Party	Candidate	Votes	%	±%
Liberal	Mathew Wilson	5,059	54.2	
Conservative	Samuel Lister	4,269	45.8	
Majority		790	8.4	
Turnout		9,328	86.4	
Registered electors		10,796		
Liberal win (new seat)				

Morrison

General election 1886: Skipton
Party	Candidate	Votes	%	±%
Liberal Unionist	Walter Morrison	4,423	50.8	+5.0
Liberal	Mathew Wilson	4,289	49.2	−5.0
Majority		134	1.6	N/A
Turnout		8,712	80.7	−5.7
Registered electors		10,796		
Liberal Unionist gain from Liberal		Swing	+5.0	

=== Elections in the 1890s ===
Roundell

General election 1892: Skipton
Party	Candidate	Votes	%	±%
Liberal	Charles Roundell	4,700	50.5	+1.3
Liberal Unionist	Walter Morrison	4,608	49.5	−1.3
Majority		92	1.0	N/A
Turnout		9,308	77.0	−3.7
Registered electors		12,087		
Liberal gain from Liberal Unionist		Swing	+1.3	

Farrer

General election 1895: Skipton
Party	Candidate	Votes	%	±%
Liberal Unionist	Walter Morrison	4,902	50.7	+1.2
Liberal	James Anson Farrer	4,763	49.3	−1.2
Majority		139	1.4	N/A
Turnout		9,665	87.1	+10.1
Registered electors		11,096		
Liberal Unionist gain from Liberal		Swing	+1.2	

=== Elections in the 1900s ===
General election 1900: Skipton
Party	Candidate	Votes	%	±%
Liberal	Frederick Whitley-Thomson	5,139	50.7	+1.4
Liberal Unionist	Walter Morrison	5,007	49.3	−1.4
Majority		132	1.4	N/A
Turnout		10,146	85.5	−1.6
Registered electors		11,865		
Liberal gain from Liberal Unionist		Swing	+1.4	

Clough

General election 1906: Skipton
Party	Candidate	Votes	%	±%
Liberal	William Clough	5,834	51.0	+0.3
Conservative	Richard Roundell	5,601	49.0	−0.3
Majority		233	2.0	+0.6
Turnout		11,435	90.0	+4.5
Registered electors		12,707		
Liberal hold		Swing	+0.3	

=== Elections in the 1910s ===
General election January 1910: Skipton
Party	Candidate	Votes	%	±%
Liberal	William Clough	6,579	52.0	+1.0
Conservative	Richard Roundell	6,071	48.0	−1.0
Majority		508	4.0	+2.0
Turnout		12,650	91.2	+1.2
Registered electors		13,864		
Liberal hold		Swing	+1.0	

General election December 1910: Skipton
Party	Candidate	Votes	%	±%
Liberal	William Clough	6,151	50.2	−1.8
Conservative	Richard Roundell	6,100	49.8	+1.8
Majority		51	0.4	−3.6
Turnout		12,251	88.4	−2.8
Registered electors		13,864		
Liberal hold		Swing	−1.8	

General Election 1914–15:

Another General Election was required to take place before the end of 1915. The political parties had been making preparations for an election to take place and by July 1914, the following candidates had been selected;

- Liberal: William Clough
- Unionist: Richard Roundell

General election 1918: Skipton
Party		Candidate	Votes	%	±%
C	Unionist	Richard Roundell	12,599	55.0	+5.2
	Liberal	William Anderton Brigg	10,318	45.0	−5.2
Majority			2,281	10.0	N/A
Turnout			22,917	64.2	−24.2
	Unionist gain from Liberal		Swing	+5.2	
C indicates candidate endorsed by the coalition government.

=== Elections in the 1920s ===
Verney

General election 1922: Skipton
Party	Candidate	Votes	%	±%
Unionist	Richard Roundell	13,251	41.7	−13.3
Liberal	Harry Verney	10,228	32.3	−12.7
Labour	Tom Snowden	8,229	26.0	New
Majority		3,023	9.4	−0.6
Turnout		23,479	85.2	+21.0
Unionist hold		Swing	-0.3	

General election 1923: Skipton
Party	Candidate	Votes	%	±%
Unionist	Richard Roundell	12,676	39.9	−1.8
Liberal	Harry Verney	11,285	35.6	+3.3
Labour	George Willey	7,767	24.5	−1.5
Majority		1,391	4.3	−5.1
Turnout		31,728	83.6	−1.6
Unionist hold		Swing	-2.6	

General election 1924: Skipton
Party	Candidate	Votes	%	±%
Unionist	Ernest Roy Bird	14,924	46.0	+6.1
Liberal	Thomas Woffenden	8,947	27.5	−8.1
Labour	George Willey	8,626	26.5	+2.0
Majority		5,977	18.5	+14.2
Turnout		32,497	83.8	+0.2
Unionist hold		Swing	+7.1	

General election 1929: Skipton
Party	Candidate	Votes	%	±%
Unionist	Ernest Roy Bird	16,588	39.5	−6.5
Labour	John Davies	13,088	31.2	+4.7
Liberal	Thomas Woffenden	12,320	29.3	+1.8
Majority		3,500	8.3	−10.2
Turnout		41,996	83.4	−0.4
Unionist hold		Swing	-5.6	

=== Elections in the 1930s ===
General election 1931: Skipton
Party	Candidate	Votes	%	±%
Conservative	Ernest Roy Bird	28,013	68.2	+28.7
Labour	John Davies	13,053	31.8	+0.6
Majority		14,960	36.4	+28.1
Turnout		41,066	80.3	−3.1
Conservative hold		Swing		

1933 Skipton by-election
Party	Candidate	Votes	%	±%
Conservative	George Rickards	18,136	43.0	−25.2
Labour	John Davies	14,157	33.5	+1.7
Liberal	Robert Denby	9,219	21.8	+21.8
Communist	James Rushton	704	1.7	+1.7
Majority		3,979	9.5	−26.9
Turnout		42,216	82.7	+2.4
Conservative hold		Swing	-13.5	

General election 1935: Skipton
Party	Candidate	Votes	%	±%
Conservative	George Rickards	22,847	56.2	−12.0
Labour	John Davies	17,788	43.8	+12.0
Majority		5,059	12.4	−24.0
Turnout		40,635	79.6	−0.7
Conservative hold		Swing		

General Election 1939–40

Another General Election was required to take place before the end of 1940. The political parties had been making preparations for an election to take place and by the Autumn of 1939, the following candidates had been selected;

- Conservative: George Rickards
- Labour: John Davies

=== Elections in the 1940s ===
1944 Skipton by-election
Party	Candidate	Votes	%	±%
Common Wealth	Hugh Lawson	12,222	44.8	New
Conservative	Harry Riddiough	12,001	44.0	−12.2
Independent Labour	Joseph Toole	3,029	11.1	New
Majority		221	0.8	N/A
Turnout		27,252	54.9	−24.7
Common Wealth gain from Conservative		Swing		

General election 1945: Skipton
Party	Candidate	Votes	%	±%
Conservative	Burnaby Drayson	17,905	41.5	−14.7
Labour	John Davies	15,704	36.4	−7.4
Liberal	Eric Townsend	9,546	22.1	New
Majority		2,201	5.1	−7.3
Turnout		43,155	80.1	+0.5
Conservative hold		Swing		

=== Elections in the 1950s ===
General election 1950: Skipton
Party	Candidate	Votes	%	±%
Conservative	Burnaby Drayson	22,254	49.2	+7.7
Labour	Thomas J. Roberts	16,290	36.0	−0.4
Liberal	Eric Arthur Greenwood	6,689	14.8	−7.3
Majority		5,964	13.2	+8.1
Turnout		45,233	88.9	+8.8
Conservative hold		Swing		

General election 1951: Skipton
Party	Candidate	Votes	%	±%
Conservative	Burnaby Drayson	26,024	59.0	+9.8
Labour	Edgar Hewitt	18,064	41.0	+5.0
Majority		7,960	18.0	+4.8
Turnout		44,088	86.1	−2.8
Conservative hold		Swing		

General election 1955: Skipton
Party	Candidate	Votes	%	±%
Conservative	Burnaby Drayson	25,101	61.2	+2.2
Labour	Vincent P. Richardson	15,919	38.8	−2.2
Majority		9,182	22.4	+4.4
Turnout		41,020	82.5	−3.6
Conservative hold		Swing	+2.2	

General election 1959: Skipton
Party	Candidate	Votes	%	±%
Conservative	Burnaby Drayson	20,278	48.3	−12.9
Labour	Frank Hooley	11,178	26.6	−12.2
Liberal	Claire Graham	10,543	25.1	New
Majority		9,100	21.7	−0.7
Turnout		41,999	85.7	+3.2
Conservative hold		Swing		

=== Elections in the 1960s ===
General election 1964: Skipton
Party	Candidate	Votes	%	±%
Conservative	Burnaby Drayson	18,561	46.2	−2.1
Labour	Roderick MacSween	11,715	29.2	+2.6
Liberal	Wilfrid E.H. Pickard	9,886	24.6	−0.5
Majority		8,846	17.0	−3.7
Turnout		40,162	84.0	−1.7
Conservative hold		Swing	−2.5	

General election 1966: Skipton
Party	Candidate	Votes	%	±%
Conservative	Burnaby Drayson	17,532	45.1	−1.1
Labour	Gordon A. Knott	13,276	34.1	+4.9
Liberal	Wilfrid E.H. Pickard	8,104	20.8	−3.8
Majority		4,256	11.0	−6.0
Turnout		38,912	82.0	−2.0
Conservative hold		Swing	−3.0	

=== Elections in the 1970s ===
General election 1970: Skipton
Party	Candidate	Votes	%	±%
Conservative	Burnaby Drayson	20,817	51.3	+6.2
Labour	Kenneth Targett	12,011	29.6	−4.5
Liberal	Jean Y.L. Burns	7,733	19.1	−1.7
Majority		8,806	21.7	+10.7
Turnout		40,561	78.6	−3.4
Conservative hold		Swing	+5.4	

General election February 1974: Skipton
Party	Candidate	Votes	%	±%
Conservative	Burnaby Drayson	19,301	43.3	−8.0
Liberal	Claire Brooks	17,185	38.6	+19.5
Labour	Terry Wheeler	8,079	18.1	−11.5
Majority		2,116	4.7	−17.0
Turnout		44,565	85.6	+7.0
Conservative hold		Swing		

General election October 1974: Skipton
Party	Candidate	Votes	%	±%
Conservative	Burnaby Drayson	17,882	41.3	−2.0
Liberal	Claire Brooks	17,232	39.9	+1.3
Labour	C.G. Burks	8,109	18.8	+0.7
Majority		590	1.4	−3.3
Turnout		43,223	82.1	−3.5
Conservative hold		Swing		

General election 1979: Skipton
Party	Candidate	Votes	%	±%
Conservative	John Grenville Bernard Watson	23,177	51.2	+9.9
Liberal	Claire Brooks	17,484	38.6	−1.3
Labour	Brian Michael Selby	4,632	10.2	−8.6
Majority		5,693	12.6	+11.2
Turnout		45,293	84.1	+2.0
Conservative hold		Swing	+5.6	
