= Malcolm Birks =

English cricketer

- Born: 29 July 1975 (age 50)
- Occupation: Architect
- Political party: Labour

Malcolm James Birks (born 29 July 1975) is a former cricketer for Cambridge and the Marylebone Cricket Club.

A wicket-keeper and right-handed batsman hailing from Keighley, Yorkshire, Birks made twenty-two first-class cricket appearances between 1995 and 2000, scoring 220 runs in total at a batting average of 12.22. He went on to play Surrey Premier League club cricket for Weybridge in 2005, and for the Marylebone Cricket Club between 2002 and 2013. For the MCC he played matches against Slovenia, Japan and Austria.

Educated at South Craven School, he is also an architect.

Birks was the unsuccessful Parliamentary Candidate for the Labour Party in the Skipton and Ripon constituency at the 2024 General Election, having previously placed second at the 2015 election.
