= Faith Lawson =

British housing officer

Faith Clokie Lawson MBE (9 February 1922 – 16 October 1998) was a British housing officer and campaigner, chairman of the Pedestrians Association from 1991 to 1997.

She was born in West Bridgford, Nottingham, the daughter of John Lawson, a pharmaceutical chemist who worked for and knew Jesse Boot, and a Methodist circuit steward. Her brother was the politician, Hugh Lawson.
