= John Davies, 1st Baron Darwen =

British cotton manufacturer and Labour politician

John Percival Davies, 1st Baron Darwen (28 March 1885 – 26 December 1950), was a British cotton manufacturer and Labour politician.

== Early life ==
The son of Thomas Pearce Davies, of Heatherfield, Darwen, in Lancashire, John was educated at Sidcot School and then Bootham School in York, before studying at the University of Manchester. He became a director of the Greenfield Mill Company.

== Political career ==
Davies became interested in socialism, and joined the Independent Labour Party and the Fabian Society. In 1910, he was president of the Darwen Fabian Society. He also became the president of the North East Lancashire Sub-Union of Adult Schools, and hosted the annual Heys Farm Adult School Guest House.

Davies repeatedly fought the Conservative seat of Skipton, in 1929, 1931, 1933, 1935 and 1945, but was never successful.

On 12 February 1946 Davies was raised to the peerage as Baron Darwen, of Heys-in-Bowland in the West Riding of the County of York. He served as a Lord-in-waiting (government whip in the House of Lords) from 1949 to 1950 in the Labour government of Clement Attlee.

== Family ==
Lord Darwen married Mary Kathleen, daughter of Alfred Kemp Brown, in 1914. He died in December 1950, aged 65, and was succeeded in the barony by his son Cedric. Lady Darwen died in 1964.

== Notes ==
Peerage of the United Kingdom
New creation	Baron Darwen; 1946–1950	Succeeded by Cedric Percival Davies
