= George Rickards (politician) =

Rickards, second from the right

George William Rickards (16 December 1877 – 27 November 1943) was a British politician. He was Conservative Member of Parliament (MP) for Skipton from 1933 to 1943.

Parliament of the United Kingdom
Preceded by Ernest Roy Bird	Member of Parliament for Skipton; 1933 – 1943	Succeeded by Hugh Lawson
