= Julian Smith (politician) =

British politician (born 1971)

The Right Honourable Sir Julian Smith KCB CBE MP
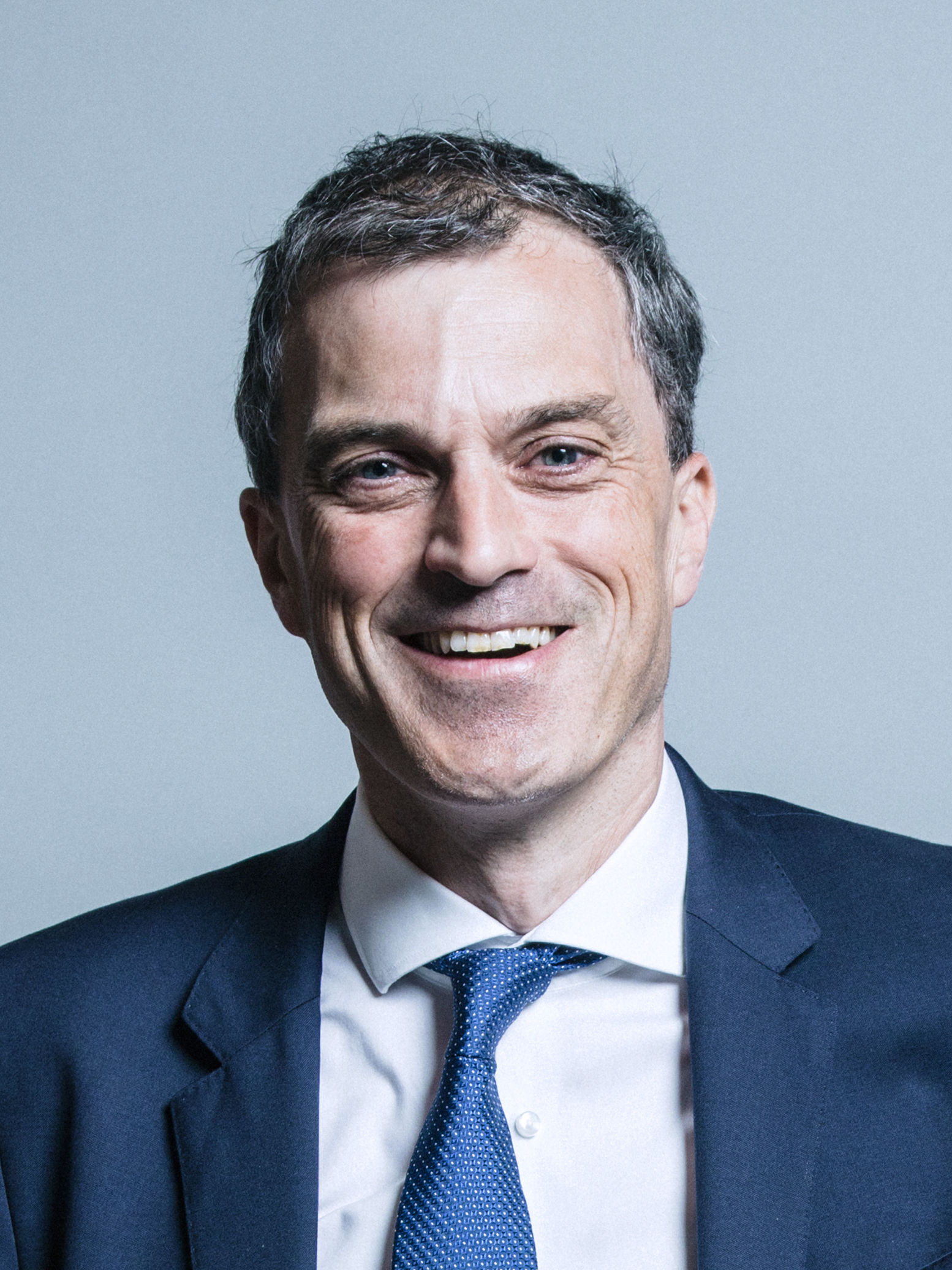
- Official portrait, 2017

Secretary of State for Northern Ireland
- In office 24 July 2019 – 13 February 2020
- Prime Minister: Boris Johnson
- Preceded by: Karen Bradley
- Succeeded by: Brandon Lewis

Government Chief Whip in the House of Commons Parliamentary Secretary to the Treasury
- In office 2 November 2017 – 24 July 2019
- Prime Minister: Theresa May
- Preceded by: Gavin Williamson
- Succeeded by: Mark Spencer

Government Deputy Chief Whip Treasurer of the Household
- In office 13 June 2017 – 2 November 2017
- Prime Minister: Theresa May
- Preceded by: Anne Milton
- Succeeded by: Esther McVey

Junior Government Whip Vice-Chamberlain of the Household
- In office 17 July 2016 – 13 June 2017
- Prime Minister: Theresa May
- Preceded by: Kris Hopkins
- Succeeded by: Chris Heaton-Harris

Member of Parliament for Skipton and Ripon
- Incumbent
- Assumed office 6 May 2010
- Preceded by: David Curry
- Majority: 1,650 (3.2%)

Personal details
- Born: Julian Richard Smith; 30 August 1971 (age 54) Stirling, Scotland
- Party: Conservative
- Education: University of Birmingham
- Website: Official website

Sir Julian Richard Smith (born 30 August 1971) is a British Conservative Party politician who has been the Member of Parliament (MP) for Skipton and Ripon since 2010. He served as Government Chief Whip from 2017 to 2019 and Secretary of State for Northern Ireland from 2019 to 2020.

He was the Vice-Chamberlain of the Household from 2016 to 2017 and Government Deputy Chief Whip in 2017. He served in Prime Minister Theresa May's Cabinet as Chief Whip from November 2017 to July 2019.

He served in Prime Minister Boris Johnson's first cabinet as Northern Ireland Secretary from 2019 to 2020. He successfully negotiated the New Decade, New Approach agreement with Tánaiste Simon Coveney, which restored the power-sharing government of the Northern Ireland Executive after three years without devolution at Stormont.

== Early life and education ==
Julian Smith was born on 30 August 1971 in Stirling. He was educated at the comprehensive Balfron High School in Balfron, followed by a sixth-form bursary to Millfield School, an independent school in Street, Somerset. He then studied English and History at the University of Birmingham.

== Parliamentary career (2010–present) ==
At the 2010 general election, Smith was elected as MP for Skipton and Ripon with 50.6% of the vote and a majority of 9,950.

In Parliament, he served on the Scottish Affairs Committee for a brief period in 2010 and was Parliamentary Private Secretary to Sir Alan Duncan MP, Minister of State for International Development, from September 2010 to 2012. Smith was subsequently Parliamentary Private Secretary to Justine Greening MP, Secretary of State for International Development, from 2012 to May 2015.

In October 2013, The Guardian alleged that Smith may have breached national security by posting an image on his website of himself alongside military personnel. Smith had previously asked questions in Parliament about whether The Guardian's handling of intelligence material leaked by Edward Snowden had breached national security. He reported the newspaper to the police. Smith argued the newspaper should be investigated as it had "endangered" British security personnel by publishing leaked information.

Smith was re-elected to Parliament as MP for Skipton and Ripon at the 2015 general election with an increased vote share of 55.4% and an increased majority of 20,761. Following the general election, Smith was appointed an Assistant Government Whip in David Cameron's Second Ministry.

Following the European Union membership referendum on 23 June and David Cameron's resignation as Prime Minister, Smith was one of six MPs who led the leadership campaign on behalf of the Home Secretary, Theresa May. After May became Prime Minister on 13 July 2016, Smith was appointed Vice-Chamberlain of the Household.

At the snap 2017 general election, Smith was again re-elected, with an increased vote share of 62.7% and a decreased majority of 19,985. After the election, he served as Deputy Chief Whip to Gavin Williamson from June 2017 to November 2017 and then, on 2 November 2017, he was appointed Chief Whip.

Smith was strongly critical of Theresa May's cabinet's behaviour following the 2017 election, saying the government should have made clear that it would "inevitably" have to accept a softer Brexit. He accused ministers of trying to destabilise and undermine May.

On 19 July 2018, Smith was reported to be resisting calls to resign his position as Government Chief Whip, following allegations that he had instructed five Conservative MPs to break pairing agreements in an important parliamentary vote the previous day. Only one MP, Conservative party chairman Brandon Lewis, complied with the instruction. Subsequent reports indicated that Smith had given similar instructions to four other MPs, but Lewis had been the only one willing to break what one commentator described later as "a centuries old 'code of honour'". Before it became known that the affair had involved approaches by Smith to more than one MP, Prime Minister Theresa May backed Lewis, stating that "The breaking of the pair was done in error. It wasn't good enough and will not be repeated."

Smith was again re-elected at the 2019 general election, with a decreased vote share of 59.5% and an increased majority of 23,694.

In February 2022 Smith called on Prime Minister Boris Johnson to withdraw insinuations that Opposition Leader Keir Starmer had culpably failed to prosecute notorious sex offender Jimmy Savile in his previous role as Director of Public Prosecutions.

At the 2024 general election, Smith was again re-elected, with a decreased vote share of 35.2% and a decreased majority of 1,650.

== Secretary of State for Northern Ireland (2019–2020) ==
Smith was made Secretary of State for Northern Ireland when Boris Johnson assumed the role of Prime Minister. Under his tenure devolved power-sharing was restored in January 2020. Smith was sacked as Northern Ireland Secretary in Johnson's post-Brexit reshuffle. After being sacked, Smith accepted paid appointments advising companies that did business there.

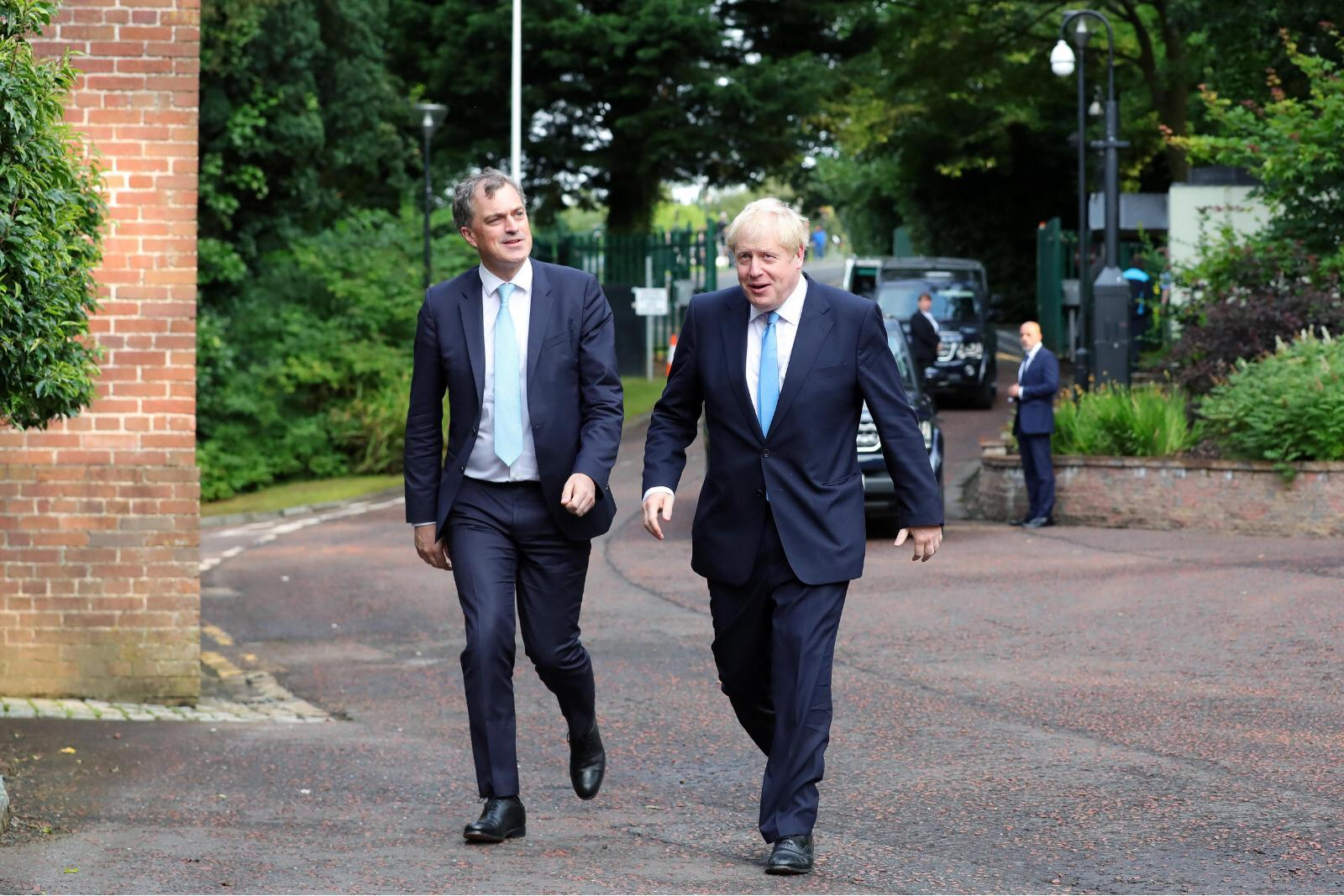
Smith (left) and Prime Minister Johnson (right) visit Northern Ireland in July 2019

The decision to dismiss Smith as Northern Ireland Secretary was criticised by a number of prominent political figures in Northern Ireland, including SDLP leader Colum Eastwood who described the move as showing "dangerous indifference" by the Prime Minister. Smith had been widely seen as instrumental in securing a cross-party deal to restore the Northern Ireland Executive, after three years without a devolved government in Stormont. Tributes to Smith's tenure as Northern Ireland Secretary were paid by NI First Minister Arlene Foster and Taoiseach Leo Varadkar. Both praised him for his role in ending the political deadlock.

Some political commentators expressed their surprise at Smith's dismissal, given his perceived success. It was suggested that Smith's testimony to the Northern Ireland Affairs Select Committee in October 2019, in which he described a potential no-deal Brexit as being "a very, very bad idea for Northern Ireland", had influenced the decision to remove him from his position. Stephen Bush, political editor of the New Statesman, speculated that the consequence of Johnson's removal of Smith would be the destabilisation of the new power-sharing agreement and increased difficulty in negotiating the details of the "New Protocol".

== Honours ==
On 28 October 2019, Smith was appointed Commander of the Order of the British Empire (CBE) in the 2019 Dissolution Honours for political and public service.

On 4 July 2024, Smith was appointed Knight Commander of the Order of the Bath (KCB) in the 2024 Dissolution Honours for political and public service.

Parliament of the United Kingdom
Preceded by David Curry	Member of Parliament for Skipton and Ripon; 2010–present	Incumbent
Political offices
Preceded by Anne Milton	Government Deputy Chief Whip in the House of Commons; Treasurer of the Household; 2017	Succeeded by Esther McVey
Preceded by Gavin Williamson	Government Chief Whip in the House of Commons; Parliamentary Secretary to the Treasury; 2017–2019	Succeeded by Mark Spencer
Preceded by Karen Bradley	Secretary of State for Northern Ireland; 2019–2020	Succeeded by Brandon Lewis
Party political offices
Preceded by Anne Milton	Conservative Deputy Chief Whip in the House of Commons; 2017	Succeeded by Esther McVey
Preceded by Gavin Williamson	Conservative Chief Whip in the House of Commons; 2017–2019	Succeeded by Mark Spencer
