= Claire Brooks =

British politician

Kathleen Claire Brooks OBE
- Born: 1931
- Died: 13 March 2008
- Occupation(s): Lawyer, Politician

Kathleen Claire Brooks OBE (née Graham; 1931 – 13 March 2008) was a British lawyer and Liberal and Liberal Democrat party politician in the radical tradition.

== Personal life ==
Claire Brooks was born at The Folly in Settle, a town in the Yorkshire Dales. Her father, Arthur Graham, was from a long line of staunch Liberals, and her sister Beth was also active in Liberal politics. She was a pupil at Skipton Girls' High School where she was head girl. She studied law at University College, London, where she was vice-president of the students' union.

She married an American citizen, Herbert Brooks, and lived for a short while in the United States. After she divorced and returned to the UK, she set up her legal practice and engaged seriously in party politics. Brooks gained a reputation as a larger-than-life, plain speaking personality both within the Liberal Party and through TV and personal appearances outside. She was never afraid to speak her mind on political platforms and regularly challenged both the party leadership and those in the party such as the Young Liberals or Liberal Students with whom she often held views in common. At one Liberal Assembly in Scarborough in the mid 1970s, when Brooks heard women waiters were getting less pay than their male counterparts she led a sit down strike in the middle of the hall. Another cause Mrs Brooks cared about was the fate of Liberal Clubs and she started a campaign to return them to their party roots. She was awarded an OBE for service to political and public life.

== Political career ==
Politically, Brooks was hailed as a person who kept Liberalism alive in the party's dark days of the 1950s. Claire Brooks first contested the parliamentary seat of Skipton in 1959, getting 27% of the poll. At the general election of February 1974, she reduced the Tory majority to just over 2,000 votes and in the October general election of the same year, came within 590 votes of ousting the Tories. This was a notable achievement, not least because Brooks had a reputation as a unilateralist in defence policy at a time when Defence was seen as a strong Tory vote-winner. By 1979 the tide was turning back to the Conservatives and the Tory majority rose again. Brooks fought the new seat of Skipton & Ripon in 1983 but came no closer. She fought Lancaster in 1987 and was a candidate in North Yorkshire in the 1979 European elections. Brooks was also sometime president of the Yorkshire Liberal Federation. She opposed the party's pact with the Labour Party under David Steel and had reservations concerning the Alliance and later with the merger of the Liberal party with the Social Democratic Party.

However electoral success was to come Brooks' way at local government level. In 1976 she was elected to Craven District Council representing Skipton Central ward. She held this seat for 23 years during which she served as Liberal group leader, chairman of the Council and Mayor of Skipton. Throughout the whole time she continued to run her solicitor's practice in the town.

In addition to her politics, Brooks was passionate about her Scottish family roots and was a founder member of the Clan Graham.
