= Charles Savile Roundell =

English cricketer, lawyer, and politician

- Roundell in 1880

Member of Parliament for Grantham
- In office 1880–1885 Serving with John William Mellor
- Preceded by: Henry Cockayne-Cust, Sir Hugh Cholmeley, 3rd Baronet
- Succeeded by: John William Mellor

Member of Parliament for Skipton
- In office 1892–1895
- Preceded by: Walter Morrison
- Succeeded by: Walter Morrison

Personal details
- Born: 19 July 1827
- Died: 3 March 1906 (aged 78) Brighton, England
- Party: Liberal
- Spouse: Julia Anne Elizabeth Tollemache
- Education: Balliol College, Oxford
- Profession: Lawyer, politician, cricketer

Charles Savile Roundell (19 July 1827 – 3 March 1906) was an English cricketer, lawyer and Liberal politician who sat in the House of Commons in two periods between 1880 and 1895.

Roundell was born at Clifton House, County York the son of Rev. Danson Richardson Roundell of Screven and Glestone Yorkshire, and his wife Hannah Foulis, daughter of Sir W Foulis, 7th Baronet. His father had adopted the surname Currer in 1801 on the death of his brother, and Roundell is sometimes referred to as Charles Savile Currer. He was educated at Harrow School where he was captain of the cricket XI and at Balliol College, Oxford. He played cricket as Charles Currer, making his first-class debut for Gentlemen of England in 1846. He played for Oxford University in 1847 and 1848 and for Gentlemen of the North in 1852. He was an occasional wicket-keeper and played nine innings in five first-class matches with an average of 7.87 and a top score of 31. He continued playing cricket for the Old Harrovians until 1862.

In 1851 Roundell was elected Fellow of Merton College, Oxford and won the Chancellor's Prize for the English essay. He was called to the bar at Lincoln's Inn in 1857 but gave up practice in 1865. He was secretary to the Jamaica Royal Commission of 1865 and in 1866 published England and Her Subject-Races: With Special Reference to Jamaica. He became private secretary to Earl Spencer, Lord Lieutenant of Ireland in 1868,

In 1868. Roundell stood unsuccessfully for parliament at Clitheroe. He was a member of the Friendly Societies Commission in 1871 and secretary to the Duke of Cleveland's enquiry into the property and income of the Universities of Oxford and Cambridge in 1872. He was a J.P. and Deputy Lieutenant for Sussex. He was one of the founding members of the Girls' Day School Trust.

At the 1880 general election Roundell was elected Member of Parliament for Grantham. He held the seat until 1885. In 1892 he was elected MP for Skipton and held the seat until 1895.

Roundell died at Brighton at the age of 78.

In 1874 Roundell married Julia Anne Elizabeth Tollemache, daughter of Wilbraham Tollemache of Dorfold Hall, Cheshire. She wrote a DNB entry for Anthony Browne and a history of Cowdray.

Roundell's brother John Richardson Currer was one of the earliest casualties of the Sandford Lasher in 1840.

Parliament of the United Kingdom
Preceded by Henry Cockayne-Cust; Sir Hugh Cholmeley, Bt	Member of Parliament for Grantham; 1880 – 1885; With: John William Mellor	Succeeded by John William Mellor
Preceded by Walter Morrison	Member of Parliament for Skipton; 1892 – 1895	Succeeded by Walter Morrison
