= Walter Morrison (politician) =

English politician (1836–1921)

- Morrison in 1895

Member of Parliament for Plymouth
- In office 1861–1874

Member of Parliament for Skipton
- In office 1886–1892

Member of Parliament for Skipton
- In office 1895–1900

Personal details
- Born: 21 May 1836
- Died: 18 December 1921 (aged 85) Sidmouth, Devon, England
- Resting place: Kirkby Malham, Yorkshire
- Party: Liberal (to 1886); Liberal Unionist (from 1886)
- Education: Balliol College, Oxford
- Occupation: Businessman, politician, philanthropist
- Known for: Advocacy of proportional representation; Support for women's suffrage; Treasurer of the Palestine Exploration Fund; Philanthropy

Walter Morrison (21 May 1836 – 18 December 1921) was an English Liberal and later Liberal Unionist politician, businessman and philanthropist who sat in the House of Commons in three periods between 1861 and 1900. A younger son of the merchant and financier James Morrison, reputedly the richest commoner of the nineteenth century, he inherited a large fortune and the Malham Tarn estate in Yorkshire. In Parliament he was associated with proportional representation and the reform of parliamentary representation, the co-operative movement, improved working-class housing, women's suffrage, and the separation of education from religious tests. He was for many years the honorary treasurer and principal benefactor of the Palestine Exploration Fund (PEF), and was among the founding trustees of the Savile Club. His obituary in The Times described him as a man of simple tastes with "an acute sense of the responsibilities of wealth".

== Family and early life ==
Morrison was the fifth son and ninth child of James Morrison (1789–1857) and his wife Mary Anne, daughter of Joseph Todd, a London draper. His father, the son of a Middle Wallop innkeeper, built the Fore Street drapery firm of Morrison, Dillon & Co. into one of the most profitable businesses in the world and amassed an immense fortune in textiles, North American railways and land; he sat in the Commons as a radical Whig and, declining a title, remained a commoner. On his death in 1857 he left fortunes to his widow and all nine surviving children. Walter, then twenty-one and newly graduated, received £300,000 and the Malham estate in the West Riding of Yorkshire, an inheritance that left him with no need to work.

Morrison was educated at Eton College and at Balliol College, Oxford, then at the height of its reputation under Benjamin Jowett, by whom he was tutored; he gained first-class honours in Greats, graduating BA in 1857 and proceeding MA in 1862. He left Oxford with a lasting scholarly interest in the Near East and the Bible Lands and a determination to promote reform in education, housing, employment, the church and Parliament. Having shown symptoms of tuberculosis as a young man, he undertook an extended tour of North America, Europe and the Near East before settling into the rhythm of life that he kept thereafter, spending the late summer and autumn at Malham and the coldest months in southern Europe, Morocco and Egypt.

Morrison was active in the Volunteer movement: he was secretary and then lieutenant of the North Craven Rifle Corps, became its lieutenant-colonel in 1865, paid for a drill hall at Settle, and in 1871 was made honorary colonel of the 3rd Volunteer Battalion, Duke of Wellington's (West Riding Regiment). He was a J.P. for the West Riding and served as High Sheriff of Yorkshire for 1883–84.

== Parliamentary career ==
Following the example of his father, who had sat for St Ives, Ipswich and the Inverness Burghs, Morrison was elected in 1861, aged 25, as Liberal Member of Parliament for Plymouth. His election address called for the reform of the civil and criminal law and the abolition of church rates and the game laws, and he made his maiden speech in a debate on the introduction of competitive examinations for entry to the Foreign Office, using the occasion to argue more broadly for reform and for an increase in the male franchise. In his early years as a member he was active in the borough's institutions, lecturing at the Plymouth Athenæum on the Suez Canal, then under construction, and at the Mechanics' Institute on "The First Two Caesars and the Two Bonapartes". He held the seat until 1874 and stood unsuccessfully for the City of London in 1880. According to the historic Hansard record he made some ninety-seven recorded contributions in the Commons between 1862 and 1900; he was diligent in attendance but regarded as a dry and difficult speaker, and held no ministerial office.

=== Electoral reform and proportional representation ===
Morrison was an advocate of proportional representation and of apportioning seats according to population, a cause that occupied him for many years and drew on Thomas Hare's Treatise on the Election of Representatives (1859).

Although Benjamin Disraeli was a Conservative, Morrison supported Disraeli's Representation of the People Act 1867. Morrison's contribution to the debates extolled the benefits of representation of minorities and proportional representation. He made a long speech on 15 June 1870 on the second reading of the Representation of the People Act Amendment Bill.

On 10 July 1872 Morrison moved the second reading of a Proportional Representation Bill he had brought in that February with Thomas Hughes, Henry Fawcett and Auberon Herbert. Adopting Hare's scheme, he held that the best solution to redistribution was "to take population as a basis, and apportion Members according to population". He did not press it to a division—unwilling to divide against Sir Charles Dilke's amendment, which he supported, that no redistribution could be satisfactory unless it extended to Scotland and Ireland and gave equal weight to every elector—and it was dropped.

Morrison also helped to fund the wider campaign for Hare's scheme, supporting the Representation Reform Association and the labour leader George Howell who acted as its secretary. At the Association's second annual meeting in 1870 he joined a conference with the Labour Representation League on the use of proportional voting to return working men to the Commons.

In a lecture to co-operators at the Co-operative Store in Toad Lane, Rochdale, in February 1873 he set out the case for "preferential voting", coupling it with larger, multi-member constituencies returning members in proportion to population and objecting to single-member districts as conducive to gerrymandering and to the corrupt power of a pivotal minority.

As a member for the naval town of Plymouth, Morrison styled himself a "dockyard member" and spoke against political patronage in the royal dockyards. He took a sustained interest in the suppression of electoral corruption: in 1867. Pressing a case arising from the royal commission's report on bribery in the riding of Totnes, he argued that prosecution should fall not only on a humble innkeeper but on all who had financed and organised the corruption. He supported the removal of the statute of limitations on corrupt practices.

=== Suffrage ===
Morrison was an early and consistent supporter of women's suffrage. On 20 May 1867, during the committee stage of the Representation of the People Bill, he was one of the seventy-three members who supported John Stuart Mill's amendment to substitute "person" for "man" and so admit qualified women to the franchise—the first division on the question in the House of Commons, lost by 196 votes to 73. He subsequently voted for Jacob Bright's bills to remove the electoral disabilities of women, his name appearing in the minority at the second readings of 3 May 1871 (Ayes 151) and 1 May 1872 (Ayes 143); in the 1871 division he was joined in the Ayes by others in his Radical circle, among them Sir Charles Dilke and Auberon Herbert. By early 1872 he had joined the central committee of the National Society for Women's Suffrage, appearing in its published list of members—alongside Florence Nightingale, Millicent Fawcett and many sympathetic Members of Parliament—as the committee's representative for the Bristol and West of England society. At a women's suffrage meeting at the Plymouth Mechanics' Institute in November 1873, a letter from Morrison expressing sympathy with the movement was read to the meeting, and the suffragist Caroline Biggs told those present that "their member, Mr. Morrison, had been of great assistance to the women's movement, and had repeatedly voted for it". His maiden speech had likewise argued for widening the male franchise.

=== Religious toleration and education ===
A recurrent theme of Morrison's parliamentary work was the separation of education from religious tests. In 1863 he joined the debate on relaxing the requirement that clergy subscribe to the whole of the Thirty-nine Articles, citing the heresy proceedings against his former tutor Jowett, and the following year he supported the abolition of the university tests that barred nonconformists from degrees, fellowships and chairs at Oxford and Cambridge, a reform carried in 1871. Consistent with these views, he was among the first governors of the Yorkshire College of Science (opened 1874, later the University of Leeds), which was open to those of any belief or none.

=== Co-operation and working-class housing ===
With Thomas Hughes, Morrison was a prominent backer of the co-operative movement, repeatedly investing in—and losing money on—co-operative productive ventures. In 1873 he provided most of the capital to buy the Monkwood Colliery near Chesterfield for the Co-operative Mining Society of Newcastle-on-Tyne; the venture was wound up in 1877 with a loss to him of some £22,000. His identification with co-operation was widely thought to have cost him his Plymouth seat in 1874, many of the town's shopkeepers being hostile to the movement. In April 1874 he presided over a sitting of the Co-operative Congress at Halifax, at which Goldwin Smith urged delegates to use their electoral power to return Morrison and Hughes to Parliament—both, in Smith's view, having lost their seats for supporting the movement. In London he supported the Improved Industrial Dwellings Company, founded in 1863 by Sydney Waterlow to provide model housing for artisans; Morrison attended its inaugural meeting at the Mansion House in 1867, soon became a director, and by the 1890s chaired its half-yearly meetings.

=== Friendly societies and self-help ===
Presiding in January 1889 over the anniversary of a lodge of the Oddfellows (Manchester Unity), Morrison praised friendly societies as successors to the medieval guilds and as "a standing protest against that custom of asking the Government to do for them that which in former times they used to do for themselves", and stressed the need for actuarial soundness and local responsibility in their management.

=== Liberal Unionism ===
Morrison's twelve years out of Parliament ended in 1886, when he broke with Gladstone over Irish Home Rule and joined the Liberal Unionists led by Joseph Chamberlain and his friend Lord Hartington. Persuaded to contest Skipton against his neighbour Sir Mathew Wilson, he won the seat, lost it to Charles Savile Roundell in 1892, regained it in 1895 and held it until 1900. When local Conservative Unionists visited Malham Tarn to congratulate him on his 1886 victory, Morrison—who described himself as a Liberal who had "come forward to fight for the Union very much against his will"—criticised Gladstone's recent conduct of foreign affairs and looked to a firm Unionist administration to bring an end to the disorder in Ireland. After his 1892 defeat he was the subject of a hostile campaign in the local Liberal press, which alleged that he raised the rents of tenants who had voted against him; Morrison, who was in fact remitting a large share of his rents, sued for libel and in 1894 the High Court found in his favour, awarding £500 in damages against the editor and printer. He retired from Parliament on his defeat in 1900.

== Business interests ==
Morrison's wealth was actively managed and substantially overseas. He was a director of the local Craven Bank from 1870 (chairman from 1905) and chairman of the Carlton Iron Company near Stockton-on-Tees from 1881, around whose works the industrial village later known as Stillington grew up. With his elder brother Charles he invested heavily in Argentina, becoming a shareholder in the River Plate banking and trust companies; on his own account he joined the board of the Central Argentine Railway in 1874 and became its chairman in 1887, travelling to Buenos Aires in 1891 to negotiate the amalgamation of competing lines and helping to establish a refrigerated-meat company. A station and town on the Central Argentine Railway were renamed Morrison in his honour in 1907.

== Palestine Exploration Fund ==
Morrison became honorary treasurer of the Palestine Exploration Fund in 1869 and held the office until 1919, regularising its finances and creating a system for managing its expeditions, without which the Fund could not have continued. He was closely involved in planning the Fund's fieldwork—he is said to have chosen the young Lieutenant Kitchener for the survey of Western Palestine—and became its leading benefactor, buying and presenting to the Fund half of William Simpson's paintings of the Jerusalem excavations and, in 1911, purchasing it a permanent headquarters at 2 Hinde Street, Marylebone, for £4,500. He edited The Recovery of Jerusalem (1871), helped found the Society of Biblical Archaeology in 1870, and contributed to the endowment of the British School of Archaeology in Jerusalem. At the Fund's annual meetings his fellow officers paid tribute to the care with which, as a trained accountant, he scrutinised its accounts.

== Savile Club ==
Morrison was among the founders of what became the Savile Club, a London club established in 1868 by men of largely Liberal and Radical sympathies, of which he remained a member with his brother Alfred. When the club—then called the New Club—took 15 Savile Row in 1871 and adopted its new name, Morrison was appointed one of its three trustees in August 1871, alongside James Heywood and Anthony Mundella.

== Philanthropy ==
Much of Morrison's giving was deliberately concealed, and his biographer characterises him as a "secret philanthropist". A governor of Giggleswick School from 1864, he marked Queen Victoria's Diamond Jubilee by paying for its domed chapel, designed by Thomas Graham Jackson and built at a cost of some £50,000; he chose its architect, materials and furnishings himself. On inheriting his brother Charles's fortune and the Basildon estate in 1909, he devoted his last years to giving his money away: beneficiaries included the University of Leeds, the King Edward VII Hospital (£5,000 a year from 1910), University College London (towards Flinders Petrie's Egyptian collection), the University of Oxford—to which in 1913 he offered £30,000 for a professorial pension fund, a readership in Egyptology and the study of agriculture—and the Bodleian Library, to which he gave £50,000 in 1920, for which Oxford awarded him the honorary degree of Doctor of Civil Law. An offer in 1911 to rebuild the chapel of Balliol, replacing William Butterfield's design, was declined after a campaign to preserve it. His Malham Tarn home was a centre of intellectual hospitality; among his guests were John Ruskin, Charles Darwin and Charles Kingsley, the last of whom is said to have been inspired there to write The Water-Babies.

== Death and estate ==
Morrison died, unmarried, at Sidmouth in Devon on 18 December 1921, aged 85, and was buried at Kirkby Malham. His will left unusually generous bequests to his servants, totalling some £50,000, with around £200,000 to his cousins and about £1,500,000 in stocks and shares divided among his nine nieces and nephews; his nephew Archibald inherited the Malham estate. The Times obituary was notably cool about his philanthropy and manner, whereas Yorkshire opinion mourned him warmly as a local "Grand Old Man".
