= Gordon Rickards =

Australian rules footballer

Personal information
- Full name: Sydney Gordon Rickards
- Born: 12 April 1884; Wahgunyah, Victoria
- Died: 6 January 1948 (aged 63); Mooroopna, Victoria
- Original team: Korumburra

Playing career^{1}
Years	Club	Games (Goals)
1903–05	St Kilda	33 (2)
- ^{1} Playing statistics correct to the end of 1905.

Sydney Gordon Rickards (12 April 1884 – 6 January 1948) was an Australian rules footballer who played with St Kilda in the Victorian Football League (VFL).
