= Ernest Bird =

British MP and solicitor (1883–1933)

Ernest Roy Bird (13 October 1883 - 27 September 1933) was a British solicitor and Member of Parliament, who represented Skipton as a Unionist between 1924 and his death in 1933.

== Life ==
Bird was educated at St. Paul's School, London and became a solicitor.

Bird was a founder of the Junior Imperial League, a precursor to the Young Conservatives. He became a parliamentary candidate after the First World War, when he unsuccessfully contested Lambeth North in the 1922 and 1923 general elections, and was elected for Skipton at the 1924 general election, after the incumbent MP retired. He was re-elected with a comfortable majority in 1929 and 1931.

In Parliament, one of Bird's achievements was the Solicitors Act 1933.

He died in September 1933, while on a visit to South Africa.

== Family ==
Bird married in 1909 Nettie Constantine Greenland, daughter of George Greenland. They had two daughters; Ursula married Charles Kimber in December 1933 (marriage dissolved 1949), and Pamela married Henry Nelson, later Baron Nelson, in 1940.
