= Richard Roundell =

British soldier and politician

Richard Foulis Roundell, FRGS (4 November 1872 – 5 January 1940) was a British soldier and Conservative politician, who served as Member of Parliament for Skipton from 1918 to 1924.

Roundell was the son of William Roundell, of Gledstone Hall, and was educated at Harrow. He served in the militia, and eventually commanded the 3rd Battalion, Northumberland Fusiliers, reaching the rank of colonel.

He contested Skipton for the Conservatives six times. He was defeated the first three times by Liberal candidate William Clough, but was elected in the 1918 general election, and then re-elected in 1922 and 1923. In Parliament, he was first private secretary to George Tryon, Parliamentary Secretary to the Ministry for Pensions. Between 1922 and 1924 he was an Assistant Whip. In August 1924 he announced his decision not to stand again, ostensibly for health reasons.

Roundell inherited the family's estates at Gledstone at an early age, but sold them to Sir Amos Nelson in 1923.

In 1898 Roundell married Beatrice Maude Wilson, second daughter of Sir Matthew Wilson, 3rd Baronet; they had one son and four daughters.
