= Skipton and Ripon =

UK Parliament constituency (since 1983)

Coordinates: 54.07°N 1.96°W

- County constituency for the House of Commons
- Boundaries since 2024
- Boundary of Skipton and Ripon in Yorkshire and the Humber
- County: North Yorkshire
- Electorate: 77,541 (December 2019)
- Major settlements: Masham, Ripon, Settle, Skipton

Current constituency
- Created: 1983
- Member of Parliament: Julian Smith (Conservative)
- Seats: One
- Created from: Skipton, Ripon, Harrogate, Thirsk & Malton, Keighley, Barkston Ash and Richmond (Yorks)

Skipton and Ripon is a constituency (Note: A county constituency (for the purposes of election expenses and type of returning officer)) in North Yorkshire represented in the House of Commons of the UK Parliament since 2010 by Julian Smith, a Conservative. (Note: As with all constituencies, the constituency elects one Member of Parliament (MP) by the first past the post system of election at least every five years.)

== Constituency profile ==
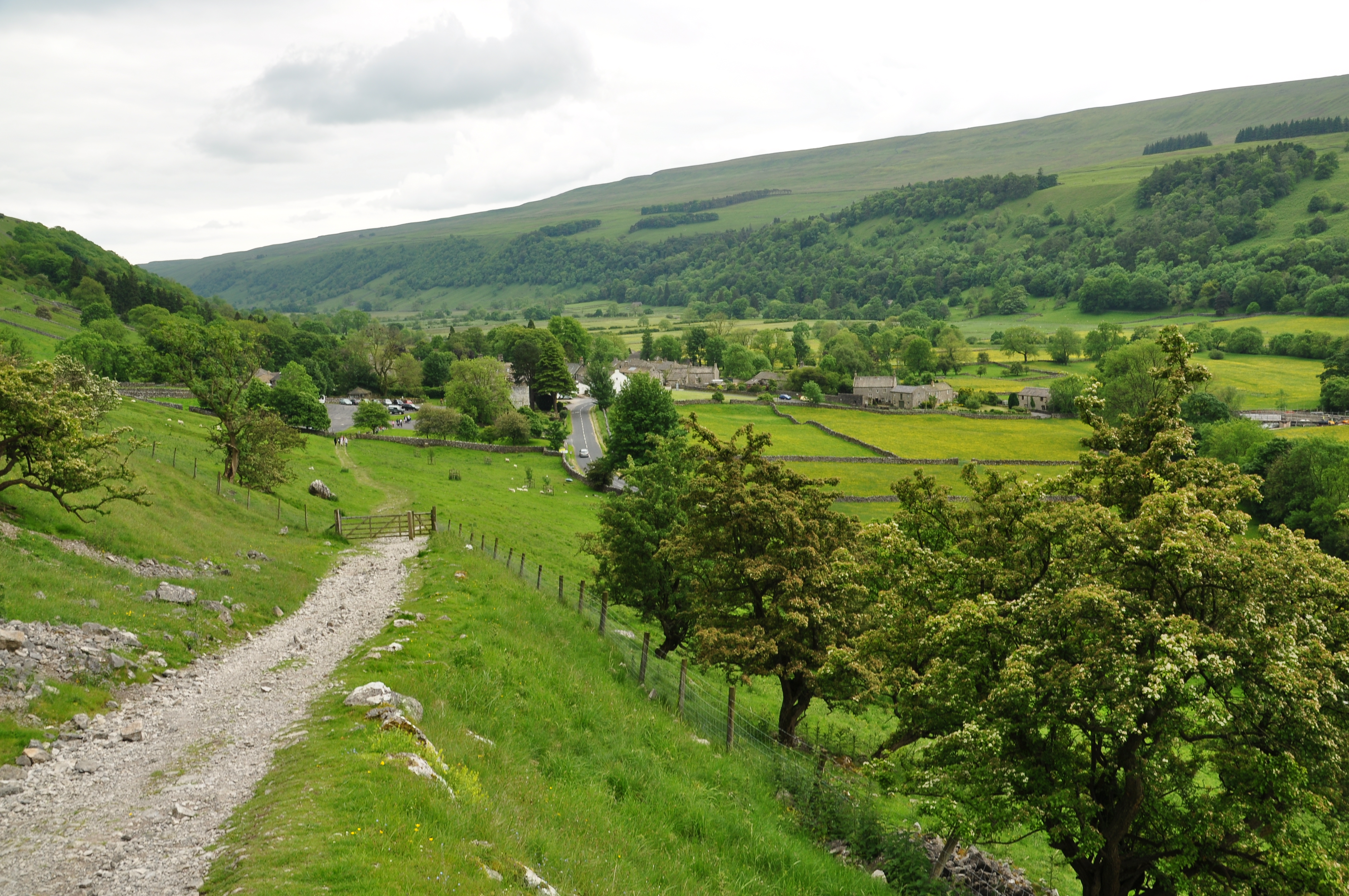
The village of Buckden in Wharfedale

Skipton and Ripon is a constituency in North Yorkshire in England. It is named after its two largest settlements, the town of Skipton and the city of Ripon, which both have populations of around 16,000. Other settlements include the towns of Settle, Bentham, Grassington, Pateley Bridge and Masham and the villages of Cross Hills, Sutton-in-Craven and Ingleton.

This is a large, rural and sparsely-populated constituency mostly taken up by Yorkshire Dales National Park and Nidderdale National Landscape. These are upland areas forming part of the Pennines, featuring moorland hills interspersed with dales and many small market towns and villages. Skipton is a historic, affluent town popular with tourists due to its position close to the Yorkshire Dales. The town has repeatedly been listed as one of the best places to live in the UK. Ripon is a small, wealthy cathedral city; the nearby Studley Royal Park and Fountains Abbey attract many visitors. The rest of the constituency is also mostly wealthy and largely agricultural. House prices across the constituency are generally similar to the UK average and considerably higher than the rest of Yorkshire.

Skipton and Ripon has a large retired population and a low proportion of young and middle-aged adults. Residents have above-average levels of income and homeownership and the child poverty rate is low. They are generally well-educated and a high proportion work in the agriculture, business administration and tourism sectors. The percentage claiming unemployment benefits is less than half the UK-wide rate. White people made up 97% of the population at the 2021 census.

At the local council, Skipton is represented by Green Party and independent councillors, Ripon by Liberal Democrats and independents and the rest of the constituency mostly by Conservatives. An estimated 53% of voters in Skipton and Ripon supported leaving the European Union in the 2016 referendum, similar to the UK-wide figure of 52%.

== History ==
The constituency was created in 1983 from the parts of the former seats of Skipton and Ripon within the county of North Yorkshire.

Before the 2024 election, it was one of the safest seats in England, formed from an area with a long history of Conservative representation and with a large majority of its electorate having in the last election voted Conservative. It was also the constituency in 1992 that when declared, saw the Conservatives gain the 4th straight majority since 1979 and John Major re-elected as prime minister.

In 2024, the Conservative majority over Labour was cut from 40.4% to 3.1%.

== Boundaries ==
=== Historic ===
1983–1997: The District of Craven, and the Borough of Harrogate wards of Almscliffe, Bishop Monkton, Boroughbridge, Fountains, Killinghall, Kirkby Malzeard, Lower Nidderdale, Mashamshire, Newby, Nidd Valley, Pateley Bridge, Ripon East, Ripon West, Wathvale, and Wharfedale Moors.

1997–2010: The District of Craven, and the Borough of Harrogate wards of Almscliffe, Bishop Monkton, Fountains, Killinghall, Kirkby Malzeard, Lower Nidderdale, Mashamshire, Nidd Valley, Pateley Bridge, Ripon East, Ripon West, and Wharfedale Moors.

2010–2024: The District of Craven, and the Borough of Harrogate wards of Bishop Monkton, Kirkby Malzeard, Lower Nidderdale, Mashamshire, Newby, Nidd Valley, Pateley Bridge, Ripon Minster, Ripon Moorside, Ripon Spa, Washburn, and Wathvale.

=== Current ===
Under the 2023 periodic review of Westminster constituencies, the seat was defined as being composed of the following as they existed on 1 December 2020:

- The District of Craven.
- The Borough of Harrogate wards of: Fountains & Ripley; Masham & Kirkby Malzeard; Nidd Valley; Pateley Bridge & Nidderdale Moors; Ripon Minster; Ripon Moorside; Ripon Spa; Ripon Ure Bank; Washburn; Wathvale.

Minor changes to take account of changes to ward boundaries in the Borough of Harrogate.

However, before the new boundaries came into effect, the District of Craven and the Borough of Harrogate were abolished and absorbed into the new unitary authority of North Yorkshire with effect from 1 April 2023. Consequently, the constituency now comprises the following from the 2024 general election:

- The District of North Yorkshire electoral districts of: Aire Valley; Bentham & Ingleton; Glusburn, Cross Hills & Sutton-in-Craven; Masham & Fountains; Mid Craven; Pateley Bridge & Nidderdale; Ripon Minster & Moorside; Ripon Ure Bank & Spa; Settle & Penyghent; Skipton East & South; Skipton North & Embsay-with-Eastby; Skipton West & West Craven; Washburn & Birstwith; Wathvale & Bishop Monkton (part); Wharfedale.

== Members of Parliament ==
Election	Member	Party
1983	John Watson	Conservative
1987	David Curry	Conservative
2010	Julian Smith	Conservative

== Elections ==
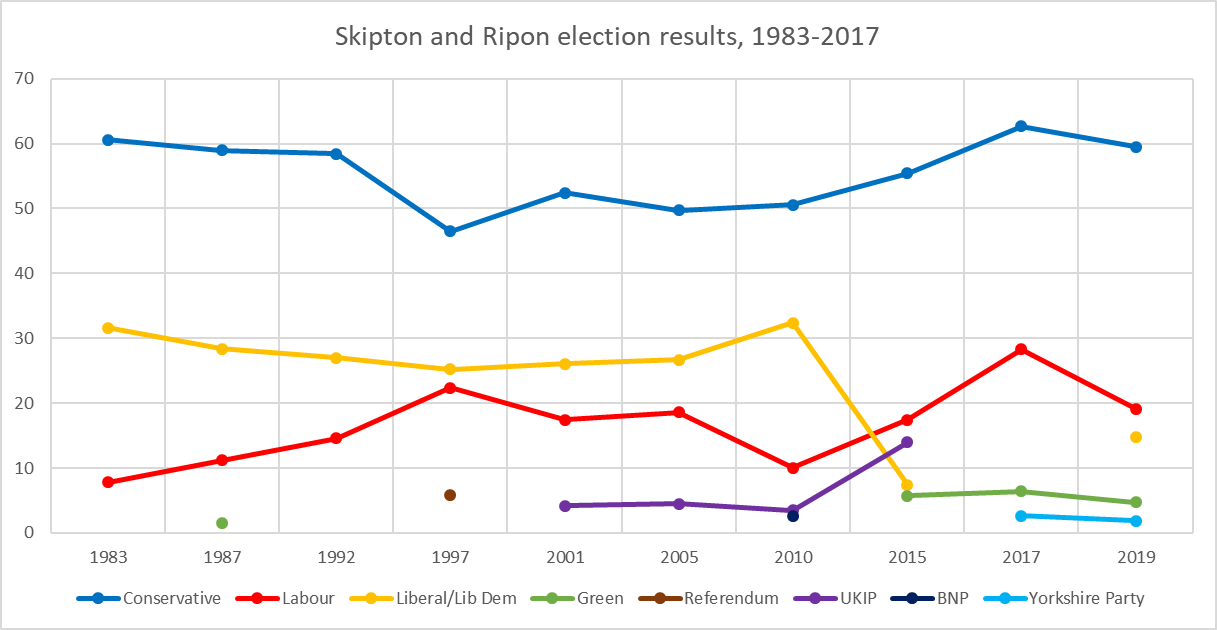
Skipton and Ripon election results

=== Elections in the 2020s ===
General election 2024: Skipton and Ripon
Party	Candidate	Votes	%	±%
Conservative	Julian Smith	18,833	35.2	−23.7
Labour	Malcolm Birks	17,183	32.1	+12.9
Reform	Simon Garvey	8,516	15.9	N/A
Liberal Democrats	Andrew Murday	4,194	7.8	−7.4
Green	Andy Brown	3,446	6.4	+1.7
Yorkshire	Ryan Kett	627	1.2	−0.8
Independent	Keith Graham Tordoff	493	0.9	N/A
Heritage	Guy Phoenix	158	0.3	N/A
Majority		1,650	3.1	−37.3
Turnout		53,450	67.4	−6.6
Registered electors		79,251		
Conservative hold		Swing	−18.3	

=== Elections in the 2010s ===
2019 notional result
Party	Vote	%
Conservative	33,416	58.9
Labour	10,899	19.2
Liberal Democrats	8,634	15.2
Green	2,693	4.7
Others	1,131	2.0
Turnout	56,773	74.0
Electorate	76,758	

General election 2019: Skipton and Ripon
Party	Candidate	Votes	%	±%
Conservative	Julian Smith	34,919	59.5	−3.2
Labour	Brian McDaid	11,225	19.1	−9.2
Liberal Democrats	Andrew Murday	8,701	14.8	N/A
Green	Andy Brown	2,748	4.7	−1.7
Yorkshire	Jack Render	1,131	1.9	−0.7
Majority		23,694	40.4	+6.0
Turnout		58,724	74.6	+0.2
Conservative hold		Swing	+3.0	

General election 2017: Skipton and Ripon
Party	Candidate	Votes	%	±%
Conservative	Julian Smith	36,425	62.7	+7.3
Labour	Alan Woodhead	16,440	28.3	+10.9
Green	Andy Brown	3,734	6.4	+0.7
Yorkshire	Jack Render	1,539	2.6	N/A
Majority		19,985	34.4	−3.6
Turnout		58,138	74.4	+6.8
Conservative hold		Swing	−1.8	

In 2017, the Liberal Democrats stood aside and endorsed the Green Party.

General election 2015: Skipton and Ripon
Party	Candidate	Votes	%	±%
Conservative	Julian Smith	30,248	55.4	+4.8
Labour	Malcolm Birks	9,487	17.4	+7.4
UKIP	Alan Henderson	7,651	14.0	+10.5
Liberal Democrats	Jacquie Bell	4,057	7.4	−25.0
Green	Andy Brown	3,116	5.7	N/A
Majority		20,761	38.0	+19.8
Turnout		54,559	71.6	+0.9
Conservative hold		Swing	−1.2	

General election 2010: Skipton and Ripon
Party	Candidate	Votes	%	±%
Conservative	Julian Smith	27,685	50.6	+0.6
Liberal Democrats	Helen Flynn	17,735	32.4	+5.8
Labour	Claire Hazelgrove	5,498	10.0	−8.2
UKIP	Rodney Mills	1,909	3.5	−1.1
BNP	Bernard Allen	1,403	2.6	N/A
Independent	Roger Bell	315	0.6	N/A
The Youth Party	Dylan Gilligan	95	0.2	N/A
Virtue Currency Cognitive Appraisal Party	Bob Leakey	84	0.2	−0.4
Majority		9,950	18.2	−4.8
Turnout		54,724	70.7	+4.6
Conservative hold		Swing	−2.6	

=== Elections in the 2000s ===
General election 2005: Skipton and Ripon
Party	Candidate	Votes	%	±%
Conservative	David Curry	25,100	49.7	−2.7
Liberal Democrats	Paul English	13,480	26.7	+0.6
Labour	Paul Baptie	9,393	18.6	+1.2
UKIP	Ian Bannister	2,274	4.5	+0.3
Virtue Currency Cognitive Appraisal Party	Bob Leakey	274	0.5	N/A
Majority		11,620	23.0	−3.3
Turnout		50,521	72.6	+6.5
Conservative hold		Swing		

General election 2001: Skipton and Ripon
Party	Candidate	Votes	%	±%
Conservative	David Curry	25,736	52.4	+5.9
Liberal Democrats	Bernard Bateman	12,806	26.1	+0.9
Labour	Michael Dugher	8,543	17.4	−5.0
UKIP	Nancy Holdsworth	2,041	4.2	N/A
Majority		12,930	26.3	+5.0
Turnout		49,126	66.1	−8.6
Conservative hold		Swing		

=== Elections in the 1990s ===
General election 1997: Skipton and Ripon
Party	Candidate	Votes	%	±%
Conservative	David Curry	25,294	46.5	−11.9
Liberal Democrats	Thomas Mould	13,674	25.2	−1.8
Labour	Robert Marchant	12,171	22.4	+7.8
Referendum	Nancy Holdsworth	3,212	5.9	N/A
Majority		11,620	21.3	−10.1
Turnout		54,351	74.7	−6.6
Conservative hold		Swing	−5.1	

General election 1992: Skipton and Ripon
Party	Candidate	Votes	%	±%
Conservative	David Curry	35,937	58.4	−0.6
Liberal Democrats	Richard Hall	16,607	27.0	−1.4
Labour	Katharine Allott	8,978	14.6	+3.4
Majority		19,330	31.4	+0.8
Turnout		61,522	81.3	+3.5
Conservative hold		Swing	+0.4	

=== Elections in the 1980s ===
General election 1987: Skipton and Ripon
Party	Candidate	Votes	%	±%
Conservative	David Curry	33,128	59.0	−1.6
Liberal	Stephen Cooksey	15,954	28.4	−3.2
Labour	Timothy Whitfield	6,264	11.2	+3.4
Green	Linda Williams	825	1.5	N/A
Majority		17,174	30.6	+1.6
Turnout		56,171	77.8	+2.9
Conservative hold		Swing	+0.9	

General election 1983: Skipton and Ripon
Party	Candidate	Votes	%	±%
Conservative	John Watson	31,509	60.6	
Liberal	Claire Brooks	16,463	31.6	
Labour	Margaret Billing	4,044	7.8	
Majority		15,046	29.0	
Turnout		52,016	74.9	
Conservative win (new seat)				

== See also ==
- List of parliamentary constituencies in North Yorkshire
- List of parliamentary constituencies in the Yorkshire and the Humber (region)
