= Feng Zhenghu =

Chinese economist and scholar

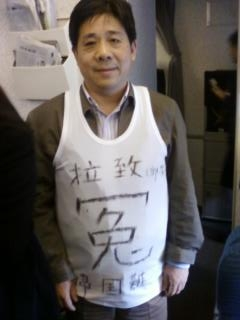
- Feng Zhenghu in Japan, wearing a shirt with his appeal to be allowed home
- Born: 1 July 1954 (age 72); Wenzhou, Zhejiang, China
- Occupations: Economist, scholar
- Known for: Living in a Japanese airport for 86 days

Feng Zhenghu
- Traditional Chinese: 馮正虎
- Simplified Chinese: 冯正虎
Transcriptions
Standard Mandarin
- Hanyu Pinyin: Féng Zhènghǔ

Feng Zhenghu (born 1 July 1954) is a Chinese economist and scholar based in Shanghai. Citing Amnesty International, The Guardian said that Feng was "a prominent human rights defender" in mainland China. In 2001 he was sent to prison for three years ostensibly for "illegal business activity". He was released in 2004 and has since written critical pieces highlighting alleged malpractice by local governments and forced evictions.

Outside mainland China, Feng is best known for having been refused re-entry into mainland China eight times in 2009, despite being a Chinese citizen. He protested and remained in the immigration hall of Narita International Airport for 92 days, attracted concern from Asian activists, and received worldwide media attention.

== Biography ==
Feng was born in Wenzhou, Zhejiang. He started his business in the 1980s and later founded the Institute of China Business Development. He lives in Shanghai and has a sister who lives in Japan with her Japanese husband.

=== Imprisonment ===
He criticized the Chinese government and the People's Liberation Army for suppressing the democratization of the Chinese society. He later went to study in Japan and returned to mainland China, and was imprisoned in 2001 for "illegal business activities".

=== Refused entry to mainland China ===
Since 2007 Feng edited "Supervision Bulletin" a 1000-copy circulation monthly newsletter reporting on cases of social injustices and official breaches of the law, such as studies of ordinary folk who had had their property seized or had rights violated by the authorities. Feng also edited four volumes of I want to post a suit: Casebook of the non-action of the Shanghai Judicial Authority, which contain 430 case studies of violations of citizens' civil rights have been violated and how their rights of appeal have been infringed.

In early 2009, Feng was inexplicably detained for 41 days; he left mainland China for medical treatment in Japan soon afterwards – in April 2009. On attempting to return home in June, he was refused entry by the authorities. According to Feng's sister, airlines prevented him from boarding a mainland China-bound flight four times; on the four occasions he succeeded in boarding a plane, Chinese authorities at Shanghai turned him away. A Japanese immigration official said Feng arrived from Shanghai on 4 November with a valid Chinese passport and a visa to enter Japan – but has refused to enter Japan, opting instead to attempt return to mainland China. He spent his time on a couch near an immigration checkpoint in the south wing of Terminal 1 of Narita Airport, subsisting on snacks given to him by travellers and activists (including Hong Kong activist Christina Chan). He has been likened to the Tom Hanks character in Steven Spielberg's 2004 film The Terminal, and has watched the film on DVD. From 3 December 2009, the airport authorities issued daily notices to Mr. Feng, requesting him to leave the arrival zone and be admitted into Japan. Finally, after several visits by Chinese diplomats from Tokyo, Feng announced on 2 February 2010 that he was going to enter Japan on the next day in anticipation of being allowed to return to Shanghai by mid February.

On 8 February 2010, Feng publicly announced his plan to return to Shanghai. On 12 February 2010, two days ahead of Chinese New Year, he successfully entered mainland China after arriving on a flight from Narita to Shanghai. Afterwards, he stayed in his Shanghai apartment under guarded house arrest. The Guardian reported in June 2010 that he remained under house arrest. Feng's house was raided more than 10 times since his return from enforced exile, he had telephones and 13 computers seized, and has alleged having been physically assaulted and suffers from consequential knee and spine injuries as he has been denied medical treatment.

== See also ==
- Chinese democracy movement
- List of Chinese dissidents
- Mehran Karimi Nasseri
- Weiquan movement
- Hiroshi Nohara
- Zahra Kamalfar
- Sanjay Shah (former Kenyan national)
- List of people who have lived at airports
