= 1920 Middleton and Prestwich by-election =

UK parliamentary by-election

The 1920 Middleton and Prestwich by-election was a by-election held on 22 November 1920 for the British House of Commons constituency of Middleton and Prestwich in Lancashire.

The by-election was triggered by the appointment as a judge of the sitting Coalition Liberal Member of Parliament, Sir Ryland Adkins KC. Adkins was appointed Recorder of Birmingham and this being an office of profit he was obliged by the electoral law of the day to submit to a by-election.

== Constituency background ==
Adkins had represented Middleton since winning the seat at the 1906 general election. At the 1918 general election Middleton was merged with Prestwich to create a new seat and Adkins retained it as a supporter of the coalition government of David Lloyd George and Bonar Law, having received The Coalition Coupon, despite the fact that he had previously acted as a loyal Asquithian. In 1918 Adkins had faced only Labour opposition and had won by a majority of 8,330 votes.

== By-election truce ==
When the by-election was first occasioned, it had apparently been the intention of the Labour Party to contest it. The Conservatives were content to stand aside again for their coalition partner. Labour were planning to put up Alderman Matthew Burrow Farr of Mossley as their candidate but owing to an outbreak of smallpox in the constituency a by-election truce was called on the advice of the medical authorities so as to avoid the need for the usual door to door canvassing and holding of public meetings. This opportunity to withdraw with honour may have suited Labour given the difficulty in winning the seat they faced against the combined Liberal and Conservative electorate lined up behind Adkins.

== Result ==
In the event therefore no candidate stepped forward to challenge Sir Ryland Adkins and he was returned unopposed.

Middleton and Prestwich by-election, 1920:
| Party | | Candidate | Votes | % | ±% |
|---|---|---|---|---|---|
| C | Liberal | Ryland Adkins | Unopposed | | |
| | Liberal hold | | | | |
C indicates candidate endorsed by the coalition government.

== Adkins, 1920–1923 ==
Adkins continued to represent the constituency until 1923, the second general election after the fall of the Coalition when he lost to the Tories by 529 votes in a three-cornered contest, with Alderman Farr for Labour and A N Stewart-Sandeman for the Conservatives.

== See also ==
- List of United Kingdom by-elections
