= Hiroshi Nohara =

Japanese traveler

Hiroshi Nohara (野原弘司, Nohara Hiroshi) is a Japanese traveler who lived for almost four months in Mexico City's Mexico City International Airport. He arrived at the airport on September 2, 2008, and left on December 29, 2008 to live in a Mexico City apartment with a woman identified as Oyuki.

== Biography ==
Nohara (born c. 1967) worked in Tokyo cleaning office buildings prior to his arrival in Mexico. During his stay at the airport, he lived off food given to him by airport fast food establishments, and blankets, clothing and other miscellaneous items brought to him by curious people who visited him. Later, owing to Nohara's acquired celebrity status, the fast food chains also started to give him branded shirts, caps, and mugs, with the expectation that the items would appear on the frequent nationwide television interviews. Nohara learned some Spanish and apparently knew some English as well. The local media did conduct an interview with him with an interpreter, yet he refused to explain his long stay at the airport, even though he did not have any documentation problems. An airport waitress suggested this was due to some relationship matter.

== See also ==
- The Terminal
- Tombés du ciel
- Mehran Karimi Nasseri
- Zahra Kamalfar
- Feng Zhenghu
- Sanjay Shah
- List of people who have lived at airports
