= Hassan Al Kontar =

Syrian refugee (born 1981)

- حسان القنطار
- Born: 13 July 1981 (age 44); Al-Suweida, Syria
- Occupation: Insurance marketing manager (2006–12)

Hassan Al Kontar (Arabic: حسان القنطار; 13 July 1981) is a Syrian-born Canadian who was stranded at Kuala Lumpur International Airport from 7 March 2018 until his arrest on 1 October 2018. He has been in exile from Syria since 2011 because of his refusal to join the Syrian military and could face arrest if returned there. Since November 2018, he resides in British Columbia, Canada.

His plight has been compared to Tom Hanks's character in the film The Terminal, who was inspired by the real-life story of Mehran Karimi Nasseri who lived in France's Charles de Gaulle Airport for 18 years. According to CNN's Becky Anderson, his situation is not "unprecedented" and could become a more common problem for Syrian refugees because many countries will not accept Syrian nationals.

== Background ==
Al Kontar was born in Al-Suweida, Syria to a Druze family. He has two siblings. His father was a mechanical engineer and his mother was a nurse. He originally emigrated from Syria to the United Arab Emirates (UAE) in 2006, to work as an insurance marketing agent.

While in the UAE, Al Kontar’s work permit expired in 2011, the year the Syrian Civil War broke out. Due to the fact that his request to renew his Syrian passport was denied by the Syrian embassy, he stayed illegally in the UAE out of the fear that he would be drafted into the Syrian Armed Forces at the height of the war. In 2017, Al Kontar obtained a new Syrian passport valid for two years, but he was arrested by Emirati authorities and subsequently deported to Malaysia while trying to renew his expired work permit. Malaysia is one of the few countries where Syrians are granted visa-free entry, although it is not a signatory to the 1951 Convention Relating to the Status of Refugees, meaning that he would not be granted refugee status. After receiving a 90-day visitor’s permit, Al Kontar stayed in Malaysia for a year, doing scrap work to save up a ticket to Ecuador so he could be reunited with his extended family members there.

In February 2018, Al Kontar purchased a one-way ticket to Quito with stopovers in Istanbul and Bogotá for US$2,300. On 28 February 2018, when he attempted to board the Turkish Airlines flight to Istanbul, ground staff at Kuala Lumpur International Airport (KLIA) denied him boarding and refused to refund his ticket. He then bought another ticket to Phnom Penh and successfully boarded the flight, but was denied entry by Cambodian authorities upon arrival. He was then sent back to Kuala Lumpur. As he had overstayed his previous permission to remain in the country, Malaysian authorities refused to allow him to re-enter, and he became stranded at Terminal 2 of the KLIA in "legal limbo".

== Life at the airport ==
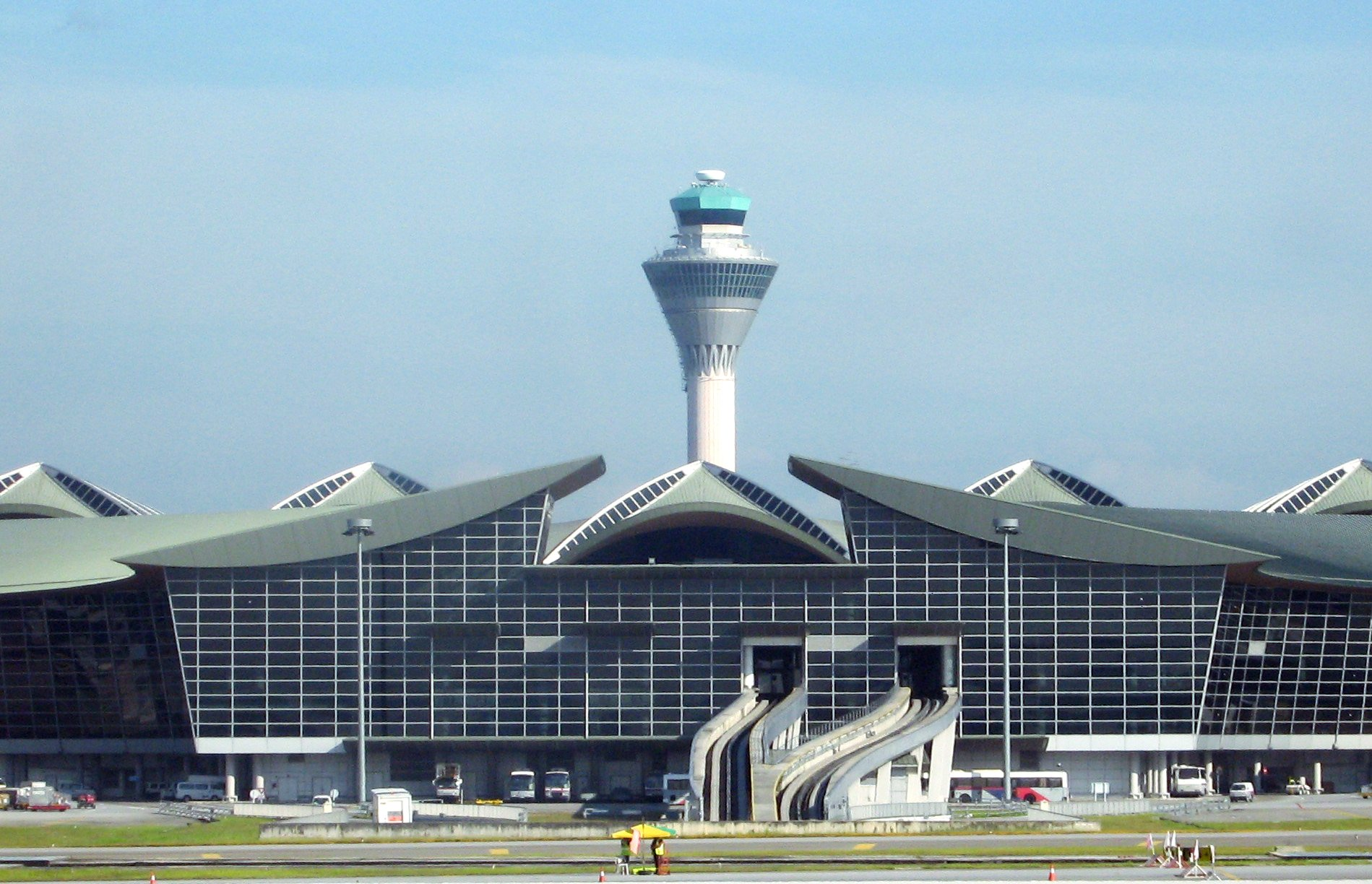
Kuala Lumpur International Airport

Al Kontar slept on chairs or under a stairwell, showered in a disabled toilet and was fed by some airport staff (mostly from AirAsia) who gave him meals. Though his savings dwindled, people offered him money and a woman living in British Columbia started a fundraiser in order to possibly sponsor him to Canada and have enough money to live for at least a year. He has family members in Canada. The United Nations High Commissioner for Refugees has been trying to provide legal aid.

On his 100th day at the airport in June 2018, he jokingly decided to apply to join a NASA mission to Mars, saying that if he actually had the opportunity to leave Earth and the worst parts of humanity, he would.

On 1 October 2018, Al Kontar was detained by Malaysian authorities for being in a "forbidden area" of the airport. Malaysia's immigration chief, Mustafar Ali, said they would "communicate with the Syrian embassy to facilitate deportation to his home country." However, he later announced that Al Kontar would be sent to an undisclosed third country as the discussion and arrangement is being processed together with the foreign mission in Malaysia. Al Kontar was held in a detention facility for 58 days before the paperwork was finalized by Canadian authorities, which expedited his asylum request.

In September 2018, Arab-Israeli video blogger Nuseir Yassin made a video about Al Kontar, but was unable to visit him because Israeli citizens were not allowed to enter Malaysia. Yassin’s personal friend, Polish citizen Agon Hare, visited Al Kontar on Yassin’s behalf instead.

== Asylum and life in Canada ==
On 26 November 2018, Al Kontar landed at Vancouver International Airport and was admitted as a permanent resident of Canada. He started a job in Whistler, British Columbia. Al Kontar had been privately sponsored for asylum in Canada; he lived with the family of one of his sponsors, media relations consultant Laurie Cooper, who has helped over 30 refugees settle in Canada. Al Kontar currently speaks at events about human rights and works full time for the Canadian Red Cross, giving back to the country that helped him in his time of need.

Since August 2019, Al Kontar has been organizing a refugee resettlement program called Operation Not Forgotten, sponsored by the Refugee Council of Australia and Amnesty International, for which they plan to raise a total of C$3.3 million to resettle off-shore asylum seekers detained by Australia who are stranded in Nauru and Manus Regional Processing Centres into Canada. These refugees are from countries including Iran, Myanmar, Afghanistan, Sri Lanka, Pakistan, and Iraq, while some are stateless.

On 11 January 2023, while residing in Princeton, British Columbia, he was granted Canadian citizenship.
