= Nohara =

Nohara (written: 野原 is a Japanese surname. Notable people with the surname include:

- Hiroshi Nohara (野原 弘司, born c.1967), Japanese traveler
- Ken Nohara (野原 健, born 1995), Japanese researcher
- Miran Nohara (野原 未蘭, born 2003), Japanese shogi player
