= Stephen Barlow (director) =

Australian opera director (b1973)

Stephen Barlow (born 1973) is an Australian-born London-based opera director. He was educated at Melbourne Grammar School and the University of Melbourne. He has directed more than 70 operas worldwide for many major companies including the Metropolitan Opera New York, Glyndebourne Festival Opera, the Royal Opera, Covent Garden, San Francisco Opera, Lyric Opera of Chicago, Santa Fe Opera, Opéra de Monte-Carlo, Estonian National Opera, Opera Holland Park (London), Scottish Opera, State Opera of South Australia, The Grange Festival, Central City Opera, (Colorado), Théâtre du Capitole Toulouse, Singapore Lyric Opera, Mid Wales Opera, British Youth Opera, Guildhall School of Music and Drama, the Royal College of Music, the Royal Northern College of Music, the Royal Academy of Music and University College Opera, London. He has also worked for the Royal National Theatre, London and the Mariinsky Theatre (formerly Kirov) in St Petersburg.

In the Autumn of 2011 he staged the opening production of the Wexford Festival Opera's 60th anniversary season - La cour de Célimène by Ambroise Thomas. These were the first performances of the opera since its premiere in Paris in 1855 and this production was nominated for the Irish Times Best Opera Production Award.

In 2015 Barlow staged a new production of Andrew Lloyd Webber's Phantom of the Opera in Bucharest, which was the Romanian premiere of the piece. In 2018 Barlow directed the same production at Folketeatret in Oslo which was the Norwegian premiere of the show, and in 2020 Barlow presented the Greek premiere of Phantom of the Opera with a return season in 2023. Since then this production has been staged in an English language version at The Arena Riyadh, Dubai Opera House, National Palace of Culture Sofia (two seasons), Sagres Campo Pequeno Lisbon (two seasons), Musical Theatre Basel, Stadsschouwburg Antwerp, Prague Congress Centre, Sava Centar Belgrade, Romexpo Pavillion Bucharest, Cankar Centre Ljubljana, Palais de Beaulieu Lausanne, Unibet Arena Tallinn, Arena Vilnius, Gliwice Arena and Ergo Arena Gdańsk.

Also in 2015 Barlow staged the London professional premiere production of Jonathan Dove's Flight (opera) at Opera Holland Park and subsequently the Scottish professional premiere production for Scottish Opera in 2018. This production was also seen at Her Majesty's Theatre, Adelaide for State Opera of South Australia in 2025.

In 2025 Barlow staged the UK premiere of Ottorino Respighi's Lucrezia (opera) for the Guildhall School of Music and Drama.

== Sources ==
- Tommasini, Anthony, "Puccini and Operetta? He Does It His Way", New York Times, 1 January 2009
