= Zahra Kamalfar =

Iranian refugee living in Canada

Zahra Kamalfar is an Iranian refugee living in Canada. She was originally from the Muslim Dervish sect and her husband was executed in Iranian custody. After her husband's death, she fled the country with her son Davood and daughter Anna. From Turkey, they fled into Russia. From Russia, the family planned to go to Germany and then seek political asylum in Canada. When Kamalfar went to Germany, the German authorities sent her back to Russia. Russia planned to deport her back to Iran but they did not. Instead, she lived in the Sheremetyevo International Airport for ten months, and finally went to Canada where she has been residing since March 15, 2007.

== See also ==
- Stateless person, people who are in legal immigration limbo and not technically allowed into any country.
- Mehran Karimi Nasseri
- Feng Zhenghu
- Hiroshi Nohara
- Hassan Al Kontar
- List of people who have lived at airports
