= 1940 Middleton and Prestwich by-election =

The 1940 Middleton and Prestwich by-election was held on 22 May 1940, after the death of the sitting MP, Nairne Sandeman. It was held during the early months of the Second World War, and five of the largest political parties – Conservative, Labour, Liberal, National Labour and Liberal National agreed to an electoral pact not to contest any by-elections in seats held by any of the other parties; as such the only party prepared to contest the election was British Union, whose main message was to call for an immediate ceasefire and a negotiated settlement with Germany.

British Union selected Frederick Haslam, who was 43 years old and working as an engineering designer. Haslam had served in France and Palestine during the First World War and had won the Military Medal at the Somme. The campaign was marred by targeted violence and intimidation; when Oswald Mosley spoke at a public meeting, he was attacked. Additionally, several British Union activists were arrested in the run-up to the election.

Nairne Stewart Sandeman had held the seat for the Conservative Party since the 1923 general election, and had won more than 60% of the vote in the 1935 general election against a Labour Party challenge. The party chose Ernest Gates to contest the by-election. Gates secured 98.7% of the votes cast and a 97.4% majority, albeit on only a forty-nine per cent turnout.

Two months later on 10 July, British Union was banned under Defence Regulation 18B.

== Result ==
Middleton and Prestwich by-election, 1940
Party	Candidate	Votes	%	±%
Conservative	Ernest Gates	32,036	98.7	+37.6
British Union	Frederick Haslam	418	1.3	New
Majority		31,618	97.4	+75.2
Turnout		32,454	49.0	–25.5
Conservative hold		Swing		
Registered electors		66,288		
