= 1897 Middleton by-election =

UK parliamentary by-election

The 1897 Middleton by-election was held on 4 November 1897 after the incumbent Conservative MP Thomas Fielden died. The seat was narrowly gained by the Liberal candidate James Duckworth, who would lose the seat at the next general election in 1900.

J. Duckworth

Middleton by-election, 1897
Party	Candidate	Votes	%	±%
Liberal	James Duckworth	5,964	51.3	+5.2
Conservative	William Mitchell	5,664	48.7	−5.2
Majority		300	2.6	N/A
Turnout		11,628	89.8	+1.5
Liberal gain from Conservative		Swing	+5.2	
