= Middleton and Prestwich =

Parliamentary constituency in the United Kingdom, 1918–1983

- Former county constituency for the House of Commons

1918–1983
- Seats: one
- Created from: Middleton, Prestwich and Radcliffe-cum-Farnworth
- Replaced by: Bury South and Heywood & Middleton

Middleton and Prestwich was a parliamentary constituency centred on the Middleton and Prestwich districts of Greater Manchester. It returned one Member of Parliament (MP) to the House of Commons of the Parliament of the United Kingdom.

The constituency was created for the 1918 general election, and abolished for the 1983 general election, when it was partially replaced by the new constituencies of Heywood and Middleton and Bury South. Its member from 1974 to the seat's abolition was Jim Callaghan, who happened to share his name with the Labour Prime Minister.

It was an unusual constituency, because Middleton and Prestwich were physically separated by Heaton Park, a large green area bequeathed to Manchester City Council, and had nothing whatsoever in common. Prestwich was a well established middle class suburb with a large Jewish minority, and during the inter-war years boasted several millionaires. Middleton, on the other hand, was greatly expanded by a large Manchester overspill council estate, and at one point during the 1950s, Prestwich had no Labour councillors, while Middleton had no Conservatives. The new constituency of Heywood and Middleton in 1983 resolved this mismatch by linking together the two adjacent towns in the Rochdale borough, and was held by Labour right up to 2019. Prestwich joined neighbouring towns Radcliffe and Whitefield in the Bury Council area to become Bury South which was gained by the Conservatives until 1997 when it was lost to Labour, who held it up to 2019 when it was regained by the Conservatives. The 2018 Boundary Commission Review, which aimed to reduce the number of MPs from 650 to 600, and was subsequently shelved, had proposed to restore the Prestwich and Middleton seat.

== Boundaries ==
Middleton and Prestwich in Lancashire, boundaries used 1974–83

1918–1950: The Borough of Middleton, and the Urban Districts of Chadderton and Prestwich.

1950–1983: The Boroughs of Middleton and Prestwich, and the Urban District of Whitefield.

== Members of Parliament ==
Election	Member	Party
1918	Ryland Adkins	Coalition Liberal
1922	Ryland Adkins	National Liberal
Nov 1923	Ryland Adkins	Liberal
1923	Nairne Stewart-Sandeman	Conservative
1940 by-election	Ernest Gates	Conservative
1951	John Barlow	Conservative
1966	Denis Coe	Labour
1970	Alan Haselhurst	Conservative
Feb 1974	Jim Callaghan	Labour
1983	constituency abolished: see Heywood and Middleton and Bury South	

== Elections ==
=== Elections in the 1910s ===
Ryland Adkins

General election 1918: Middleton and Prestwich
Party		Candidate	Votes	%
C	Coalition Liberal	Ryland Adkins	14,831	69.5
	Labour	John Battle	6,501	30.5
Majority			8,330	39.0
Turnout			21,332	
Registered electors				
	Liberal win (new seat)			
C indicates candidate endorsed by the coalition government.

=== Elections in the 1920s ===
1920 Middleton and Prestwich by-election
Party		Candidate	Votes	%	±%
C	National Liberal	Ryland Adkins	Unopposed		
	National Liberal hold				
C indicates candidate endorsed by the coalition government.

General election 1922: Middleton and Prestwich
Party	Candidate	Votes	%	±%
National Liberal	Ryland Adkins	14,832	58.5	−11.0
Labour	Matthew Burrow Farr	10,505	41.5	+11.0
Majority		4,327	17.0	−22.0
Turnout		25,337		
Registered electors				
National Liberal hold		Swing		

General election 1923: Middleton and Prestwich
Party	Candidate	Votes	%	±%
Unionist	Nairne Sandeman	10,029	36.6	New
Liberal	Ryland Adkins	9,500	34.7	−23.8
Labour	Matthew Burrow Farr	7,849	28.7	−12.8
Majority		529	1.9	N/A
Turnout		27,378		
Registered electors				
Unionist gain from Liberal		Swing		

General election 1924: Middleton and Prestwich
Party	Candidate	Votes	%	±%
Unionist	Nairne Sandeman	16,005	51.3	+14.7
Labour	Matthew Burrow Farr	8,442	27.0	−1.7
Liberal	Ryland Adkins	6,763	21.7	−13.0
Majority		7,563	24.3	+22.4
Turnout		31,210		
Registered electors				
Unionist hold		Swing	+8.2	

General election 1929: Middleton and Prestwich
Party	Candidate	Votes	%	±%
Unionist	Nairne Sandeman	16,629	40.1	−11.2
Labour	Matthew Burrow Farr	14,368	34.6	+7.6
Liberal	David Halliwell	10,526	25.3	+3.6
Majority		2,261	5.5	−18.8
Turnout		41,523		
Registered electors				
Unionist hold		Swing	-9.4	

=== Elections in the 1930s ===
General election 1931: Middleton and Prestwich
Party	Candidate	Votes	%	±%
Conservative	Nairne Sandeman	31,702	74.6	+34.5
Labour	T McCall	10,796	25.4	−9.2
Majority		20,906	49.2	+43.7
Turnout		42,498	77.9	
Registered electors				
Conservative hold		Swing		

General election 1935: Middleton and Prestwich
Party	Candidate	Votes	%	±%
Conservative	Nairne Sandeman	27,369	61.1	−15.5
Labour	Joseph Nuttall	17,398	38.9	+13.5
Majority		9,971	22.2	−27.0
Turnout		44,767	74.5	−3.4
Registered electors				
Conservative hold		Swing		

=== Elections in the 1940s ===
General Election 1939–40: Another General Election was required to take place before the end of 1940. The political parties had been making preparations for an election to take place from 1939 and by the end of this year, the following candidates had been selected;

- Conservative: Ernest Gates
- Labour: Mabel Tylecote

However, the sitting MP, Nairne Sandeman, died on 23 April 1940, resulting in a by-election. Due to an electoral pact during World War II not to contest by-elections, the Labour candidate did not stand.

1940 Middleton and Prestwich by-election
Party	Candidate	Votes	%	±%
Conservative	Ernest Gates	32,036	98.7	+37.6
British Union of Fascists	Frederick Haslam	418	1.3	New
Majority		31,618	97.4	+75.2
Turnout		32,454	49.0	–25.5
Registered electors				
Conservative hold		Swing		

General election 1945: Middleton and Prestwich
Party	Candidate	Votes	%	±%
Conservative	Ernest Gates	26,669	50.7	−10.4
Labour	Mabel Tylecote	25,908	49.3	+10.4
Majority		761	1.4	−20.8
Turnout		52,577	75.3	+0.8
Registered electors				
Conservative hold		Swing		

=== Elections in the 1950s ===
General election 1950: Middleton and Prestwich
Party	Candidate	Votes	%	±%
Conservative	Ernest Gates	24,521	50.25	
Labour	Charles Stanley Hilditch	16,716	34.25	
Liberal	Ernest Harrison	7,564	15.50	New
Majority		7,805	16.00	
Turnout		48,801	86.87	
Registered electors				
Conservative hold		Swing		

General election 1951: Middleton and Prestwich
Party	Candidate	Votes	%	±%
Conservative	John Barlow	26,073	54.15	
Labour	Albert Knight	16,323	33.90	
Liberal	Ernest Harrison	5,757	11.96	
Majority		9,750	20.25	
Turnout		48,153	84.99	
Registered electors				
Conservative hold		Swing		

General election 1955: Middleton and Prestwich
Party	Candidate	Votes	%	±%
Conservative	John Barlow	27,096	61.46	
Labour	Edmund Dell	16,989	38.54	
Majority		10,107	22.92	
Turnout		44,085	75.47	
Registered electors				
Conservative hold		Swing		

General election 1959: Middleton and Prestwich
Party	Candidate	Votes	%	±%
Conservative	John Barlow	31,416	59.65	
Labour	Fred Barton	21,248	40.35	
Majority		10,168	19.30	
Turnout		52,664	79.97	
Registered electors				
Conservative hold		Swing		

=== Elections in the 1960s ===
General election 1964: Middleton and Prestwich
Party	Candidate	Votes	%	±%
Conservative	John Barlow	22,192	40.11	
Labour	Ron Leighton	20,066	36.27	
Liberal	Samuel Crilly	13,064	23.61	New
Majority		2,126	3.84	
Turnout		55,322	79.42	
Registered electors				
Conservative hold		Swing		

General election 1966: Middleton and Prestwich
Party	Candidate	Votes	%	±%
Labour	Denis Coe	23,938	44.73	
Conservative	John Barlow	20,121	37.60	
Liberal	Samuel Crilly	9,457	17.67	
Majority		3,817	7.13	
Turnout		53,516	78.01	
Registered electors				
Labour gain from Conservative		Swing		

=== Elections in the 1970s ===
General election 1970: Middleton and Prestwich
Party	Candidate	Votes	%	±%
Conservative	Alan Haselhurst	25,030	43.76	
Labour	Denis Coe	23,988	41.94	
Liberal	Samuel Crilly	8,175	14.29	
Majority		1,042	1.82	
Turnout		57,193	74.72	
Registered electors				
Conservative gain from Labour		Swing		

General election February 1974: Middleton and Prestwich
Party	Candidate	Votes	%	±%
Labour	Jim Callaghan	24,357	39.84	
Conservative	Alan Haselhurst	23,840	38.99	
Liberal	Philip Harrison	12,946	21.17	
Majority		517	0.85	N/A
Turnout		61,143	80.49	
Registered electors				
Labour gain from Conservative		Swing		

General election October 1974: Middleton and Prestwich
Party	Candidate	Votes	%	±%
Labour	Jim Callaghan	26,639	45.82	
Conservative	Alan Fearn	22,925	39.43	
Liberal	J Clarney	8,340	14.35	
More Prosperous Britain	Harold Smith	234	0.40	New
Majority		3,714	6.39	
Turnout		58,138	75.76	
Registered electors				
Labour hold		Swing		

General election 1979: Middleton and Prestwich
Party	Candidate	Votes	%	±%
Labour	Jim Callaghan	27,918	45.79	
Conservative	J Park	26,820	43.98	
Liberal	D Whatmough	5,888	9.66	
National Front	S Andrews	350	0.57	New
Majority		1,098	1.81	
Turnout		60,976	78.89	
Registered electors				
Labour hold		Swing		
