= Lucy Crowe =

British soprano in opera and concert

Lucy Crowe OBE
- Born: 1978 (age 46–47); Staffordshire, England
- Education: Royal Academy of Music; British Youth Opera
- Occupation: Operatic soprano
- Awards: Royal Overseas Gold Medal; Kathleen Ferrier Award

Lucy Mary Elizabeth Crowe OBE is an English soprano in opera and concert. She has performed at international opera houses and music festivals such as the Glyndebourne Festival and Rheingau Musik Festival.

== Career ==
Born in Staffordshire, England, Crowe studied voice at the Royal Academy of Music and trained with British Youth Opera in 2002 and again in 2004. Crowe received the Royal Overseas Gold Medal in 2002, and won second prize in the Kathleen Ferrier Award in 2005.

In the field of historically informed performance she has collaborated with the Orchestra of the Age of Enlightenment, The Sixteen, The King's Consort and Les Musiciens du Louvre, among others. She has sung in Mozart's Requiem, with Yannick Nézet-Séguin conducting the Philadelphia Orchestra, Haydn's oratorios The Creation and The Seasons with John Eliot Gardiner. In 2010 she performed at the Wigmore Hall with Rolando Villazón and the Gabrieli Consort conducted by Paul McCreesh: "Lucy Crowe handled a couple of Cleopatra's arias from Giulio Cesare with all the bright radiant tone and effortless facility they deserve." In 2012 she was reported as saying that she was mainly seen as a baroque singer, although she was developing other repertoire.

In 2012 she sang the soprano part in Mahler's Resurrection Symphony on a festival tour with the City of Birmingham Symphony Orchestra, conducted by Andris Nelsons.

In April 2021, Crowe was joined by the London Handel Players at the Wigmore Hall in a performance of three works, J.S. Bach's Cantata Ich habe genug, BWV 82a and two arias by Handel. In January 2025, Crowe was again in concert at the Wigmore Hall singing Corelli and Handel with The English Concert directed by Trevor Pinnock.

=== Opera ===
Crowe made her debut with the Scottish Opera, appearing as Sophie in Der Rosenkavalier by Richard Strauss. In April 2007 her Drusilla, in The Coronation of Poppea with English National Opera was described as "feisty". Also in 2007 she joined ENO in David McVicar's staging of Handel's Agrippina where her "beguiling" Poppea was described as "the most exciting discovery ... rendered the more so by her frequent stripteases." In April 2012 she performed for the first time the part of Gilda in Verdi's Rigoletto at the Royal Opera, stepping in at short notice on a recommendation by conductor John Eliot Gardiner. In May and June 2013 she performed the title role of Leoš Janáček's The Cunning Little Vixen at the Glyndebourne Festival. A review noted:

The action is dominated by Lucy Crowe's Vixen, a powerhouse of foxy ingenuity, her tail switching saucily while her light and easy soprano floats through Janáček's sometimes treacherous lines.

In 2013 she sang Gilda again at the Deutsche Oper Berlin, conducted by Roberto Rizzi Brignoli. In 2014 she sang Adina in Donizetti's L'elisir d'amore at the Royal Opera. In 2015 Crowe performed in Couperin's Leçons des ténèbres at the Spitalfields Festival. Writing in The Daily Telegraph, Jonathan McAloon said:

Singing the first of the three Leçons, Crowe’s acclaim as an international opera star was evident in her command of dynamics and characterisation; the purity of her higher register was offset by the tormented, near faltering effect she produced in the lower passages.

She is a Trustee of the Royal Academy of Music and a vice president of British Youth Opera.

Crowe was appointed Officer of the Order of the British Empire (OBE) in the 2023 Birthday Honours for services to music.
