= Thomas Fielden (politician) =

British Conservative Party politician

Fielden in 1895.

Thomas Fielden (1854 – 5 October 1897) was a British Conservative Party politician.

He was born at Todmorden, Lancashire, in 1854, eldest son of Joshua Fielden. His father, his grandfather John Fielden of Todmorden, and brother Edward Brocklehurst Fielden were also Members of Parliament.

Fielden was educated at Wellington College and at Trinity College, Cambridge.

In 1878 he married Martha, daughter of Thomas Knowles of Darn Hall, Cheshire, who was Member of Parliament for Wigan Coincidentally, his brother, Edward, married another daughter of Knowles, Mary Ellen, later on in 1884.

He was a director of the Lancashire and Yorkshire Railway company, and a J.P. for the county of the West Riding of Yorkshire, where his home was at Grimston Park, near Tadcaster.

He was elected at the 1886 general election as Member of Parliament (MP) for the Middleton division of Lancashire, a constituency that included his ancestral home at Todmorden, having unsuccessfully contested the seat in 1885. He was narrowly defeated in 1892 (by only 116 votes), but was re-elected to the House of Commons in 1895. He died in office in 1897, aged 43, having died suddenly while grouse shooting in North Amulree, Perthshire, Scotland.

Parliament of the United Kingdom
Preceded by George Salis-Schwabe	Member of Parliament for Middleton; 1886–1892	Succeeded by Charles Henry Hopwood
Preceded by Charles Henry Hopwood	Member of Parliament for Middleton; 1895–1897	Succeeded by James Duckworth
