= James Duckworth (businessman, born 1840) =

British politician (1840 - 1915)

Sir James Duckworth
- Duckworth in 1900

Member of Parliament for Borough of Stockport with George Wardle
- In office 1906–1910
- Preceded by: Sir Joseph Leigh with Beresford Valentine Melville
- Succeeded by: Spencer Leigh Hughes with George Wardle

Member of Parliament for Middleton
- In office 1897–1900
- Preceded by: Thomas Fielden
- Succeeded by: Edward Fielden
- Majority: 300

Councillor for Lancashire County Council
- In office 1892–1898

Mayor of Rochdale
- In office 1910–1911
- Preceded by: Wilson Dunning
- Succeeded by: Sir Samuel Turner

Mayor of Rochdale
- In office 1901–1903
- Preceded by: Ormerod Topper
- Succeeded by: Henry Fishwick

Mayor of Rochdale
- In office 1891–1893
- Preceded by: E. Taylor
- Succeeded by: James Cheetham

Councillor for Castleton West
- In office 1887–1915

Personal details
- Born: 14 February 1840 Haslingden, Rossendale, Lancashire
- Died: 1 January 1915 (aged 74)
- Party: Liberal Party
- Occupation: Politician

Sir James Duckworth (14 February 1840 – 1 January 1915) was a self-made English businessman from Rochdale, Lancashire who rose from poverty to start a large chain a grocery shops known popularly as "Jimmy Duck's" and entered politics as a Liberal. He served three times as Mayor of Rochdale, and was elected twice as a Member of Parliament (MP).

== Early life ==
Duckworth was born on 14 February 1840 at Balladen Brook, near Haslingden, Rossendale, Lancashire. His father Ralph was a poor weaver who had been the youngest of fourteen children, and found work in Rochdale. In his autobiography, Duckworth recorded that three weeks after his birth his mother carried him in her arms to join her husband, "begging her way over Ashworth Moor".

Ralph's father died when James three years old, who as the eldest of three sons was set to work at the age of six-and-a-half as a doffer in a cotton mill. He worked half-time until the age of eleven, when he began full-time work, (The doffer's job was at the end of the spinning process, replacing bobbins which had filled with thread with empty ones).

Fifty years later, he described his experiences to the House of Commons, when he spoke in favour of the Education of Children Bill, which raised the minimum working age to 12. In a speech which was widely circulated, he attributed his own good health and six-foot stature to the "survival of the fittest", noting:

I happen to come from an ancestry not composed of cotton weavers, but of yeomen farmers, who endowed me with a stock of vitality which all the hardships of my early life could not kill. But I often ask myself—where are the companions of my youth? With a few exceptions they are gone, and those exceptions are like the solitary trees now standing here and there in our Lancashire valleys and on our hillsides, where in earlier days dense forests grew, showing signs of stunted growth and more dead than alive. Sometimes I have met the companions of former days. They are younger than I am, but they are grey and bent, and show unmistakeable evidences of the hardships they have gone through.

— House of Commons debates, 1 March 1899, vol 67, cc920-93

By the age of fourteen he was earning 15 shillings per week and was the main support of his family. At seventeen, he joined the Royal Marines, but served only for about eight months. In his teens he attended a night school, but irregularly, and did not study seriously until he was 20, when he began to attend evening classes and to study arithmetic, writing, grammar, composition and elocution.

When the Lancashire Cotton Famine devastated the local economy in 1862, Duckworth had a wife and child to support. Having considered emigration to the United States, he escaped unemployment with a job in the warehouse of a wool merchant, and later described this as the turning point in his career.

He later he became town missioner in Heywood, but his health collapsed and he had to relinquish the job. He was advised that an active, outdoor life would restore his health, so on the suggestion of a friend he began selling tea.

== James Duckworth, the grocers ==
Duckworth started with one pound of tea divided into two-pounce packets, and the business thrived while his health recovered. In 1868 he and his wife opened their first shop on the Oldham Road, followed in 1876 by a warehouse on Whitehall Street from where he started as a wholesale business. More shops followed, as did more warehouses: the second opened in John Street 1878, and the third in 1891.

The business (which was popularly known as "Jimmy Duck's") continued to prosper and was incorporated in 1895 as a limited company formally called "James Duckworth Ltd", with his only son, also called James Duckworth, as vice-chairman. By 1900, when the company moved its operations to a new four-storey warehouse, it had 80 stores. The firm moved beyond grocery to include bakery, confectionery, general provisions, bookselling, and even hotel and coffee-house keeping. Duckworth said that when he started wholesaling, he had to bribe Co-operatives to get them to order from him.

Duckworth attributed the success of his business to selling for cash at the lowest margins possible, and to selling goods "not because they were cheap but because they were good value". He claimed to be "the first to open shops in country districts and sell goods at the same prices as we sold them at in the town", and said that his methods reduced prices by "five to seven-and-a-half per cent".

He retired as chairman and managing director in 1905, but retained his seat on the board. On his retirement, he entertained the company's employees at the Town Hall, where he announced a plan to place £2,000 with the company to start a benevolent fund for the benefit of ill or injured employees, or those force to retire through old age.

His son James grew the business so it went to 170 shops across Lancashire, Cheshire and Yorkshire, but he died in 1937 and the business transferred to his sons Geoffrey, Alan and Roger. The brothers added further stores and by 1948, when the business became a public company, it had 180 stores. The company also owned fellow grocery chains of Wallaces and Globe Tea Company. In 1958, North East based Wright's Biscuits purchased the business. During the 1960s Duckworths moved into supermarkets, but by the 1970s stores were either closed or transferred to another brand owned by Wright's or its sister company Moores Stores.

== Other business interests ==
Duckworth's commercial involvement extended beyond his own family firm. He was a long-serving director of Boots Limited, and chairman of the National Tea Union, of Smallmans Limited in Manchester and of Belfield Limited in Rochdale. His other business interests included involvement in the cotton industry in the Stockport area, and to newspapers as proprietor of both the Manchester Weekly Chronicle and the Cheshire and County News He also bought the Rochdale Coffee House Company, partly for commercial gain but also in support of temperance and to create in each of the taverns a large room fitted with cubicles for the accommodation of working men who needed temporary lodgings.

== Political career ==
Duckworth had been a reformer since his youth, driven by own impoverished beginnings and inspired by attending the speeches of the Radical politician John Bright. Bright's colleague Richard Cobden represented the town for six years, and Duckworth was present for Cobden's last speech, delivered in November 1864 in Robinson's warehouse in Rochdale. When the Liberal Party split over William Ewart Gladstone's Irish Home Rule Bill, Bright and many of the other Radicals joined the breakaway Liberal Unionists, but Duckworth broke with his mentor and supported Gladstone.

He had entered local political politics, standing at the November 1884 elections to Rochdale Town Council in the Tory-held Castleton North ward, but did not win a seat. He was defeated a few weeks later at a council by-election in Castleton West, but finally made it onto the council in December 1887 when he was elected unopposed at another by-election in Castleton West. He became mayor of Rochdale for two years in 1891, and held the office for a further two terms from 1901 to 1903. He was mayor for a final term from 1910 to 1911. He was also a member of Lancashire County Council from 1892 to 1898, for Castleton and Milnrow.

He first stood for election to the House of Commons at a by-election in May 1895 in Warwick and Leamington, where he lost to the Liberal Unionist candidate, Alfred Lyttelton. He did not contest the seat at the subsequent general election in July 1895, when Lyttelton was returned unopposed.

However, two years later he stood at the by-election in November 1897 in the Middleton division of Lancashire, following the death of the Conservative MP Thomas Fielden. Duckworth won the seat by only 300 votes (less than 3% of the total), but at the 1900 general election he was unseated by an even smaller margin by the Conservative candidate Edward Brocklehurst Fielden, his predecessor's brother.

Duckworth returned to Parliament six years later, at the 1906 general election, when he won one of the two seats in the Borough of Stockport. However, he did not defend the seat at the January 1910 general election, by which time he was 70 years old.

He was knighted on 18 December 1908 and died in 1915, aged 75.

Sir James Duckworth was a committed Christian, a lifelong member of the United Methodist Free Churches (UMFC). He attended Baillie Street Chapel and later Castlemere, William Street Chapel when it was built. He was a leading figure in the UMFC denomination. In 1894 he was made president of the Annual Assembly. As a layman he was one of only two to be given this honour. He was the first Rochdale mayor to observe 'Mayoral Sunday' and on Sunday 13 November 1892 he and the Corporation attended the morning service at St Chad's Parish Church and in the evening at Castlemere UMFC.

Parliament of the United Kingdom
Preceded by Thomas Fielden	Member of Parliament for Middleton; 1897–1900	Succeeded by Edward Fielden
Preceded by Sir Joseph Leigh; Beresford Valentine Melville	Member of Parliament for Stockport; 1906 – Jan. 1910; With: George Wardle	Succeeded by Spencer Leigh Hughes; George Wardle
Civic offices
Preceded by E. Taylor	Mayor of Rochdale; 1891–1893	Succeeded by James Cheetham
Preceded by Ormerod Topper	Mayor of Rochdale; 1901–1903	Succeeded by Henry Fishwick
Preceded by Wilson Dunning	Mayor of Rochdale; 1910–1911	Succeeded by Sir Samuel Turner
