= 1911 Middleton by-election =

UK parliamentary by-election

The 1911 Middleton by-election was a parliamentary by-election held on 2 August 1911 for the Middleton division of Lancashire, a constituency of the British House of Commons.

== Vacancy ==
Ryland Adkins had been Liberal MP for Middleton since 1906 when he gained the seat from the Conservatives. Upon his appointment as Recorder of Nottingham on 17 July 1911, Adkins was obliged by the electoral law of the day to resign his seat and re-contest it at a by-election.

== Electoral history ==
Ryland Adkins

General election December 1910: Middleton Electorate 15,391
Party	Candidate	Votes	%	±%
Liberal	Ryland Adkins	7,071	52.9	−2.1
Liberal Unionist	William Hewins	6,284	47.1	+2.1
Majority		787	5.8	−4.2
Turnout		13,355	86.8	−3.7
Liberal hold		Swing	-2.1	

== Candidates ==
Adkins's Unionist opponent was William Hewins who was his opponent at the December 1910 general election.

== Campaign ==
The by-election was fought mainly on the issue of National Insurance which Hewins took up vigorously, if by some accounts rather cynically. In the course of the campaign Lloyd George had to send Adkins a letter for public consumption refuting in detail Hewins’ claims.

== Result ==
Adkins held on, although Hewins reduced his majority again, this time to 411 votes.

Middleton by-election, 1911 Electorate 15,447
Party	Candidate	Votes	%	±%
Liberal	Ryland Adkins	6,863	51.5	−1.4
Liberal Unionist	William Hewins	6,452	48.5	+1.4
Majority		411	3.0	−2.8
Turnout		13,315	86.2	−0.6
Liberal hold		Swing	-1.4	

== Aftermath ==
Hewins was elected in a by-election at Hereford in 1912. A General Election was due to take place by the end of 1915. By the autumn of 1914, the following candidates had been adopted to contest that election.

General Election 1914/15: Middleton Electorate
Party	Candidate	Votes	%	±%
Liberal	Ryland Adkins			
Unionist				

Due to the outbreak of war, the election never took place. In 1918, following boundary changes, the Middleton constituency was combined with Prestwich.

General election 14 December 1918: Middleton & Prestwich Electorate 36,563
Party	Candidate	Votes	%	±%
Liberal	Ryland Adkins	14,831	69.5	+18.0
Labour	John B Battle	6,501	30.5	New
Majority		8,330	39.0	+36.0
Turnout		21,332		
Liberal win (new seat)				

- Adkins was the endorsed candidate of the Coalition Government.
