= Denis Coe =

British politician

Denis Coe MP

Member of Parliament for Middleton and Prestwich
- In office 31 March 1966 – 29 May 1970
- Preceded by: John Barlow
- Succeeded by: Alan Haselhurst

Personal details
- Born: Denis Walter Coe; 5 June 1929 Whitley Bay, Northumberland, England
- Died: 3 March 2015 (aged 85)
- Party: Labour

Denis Walter Coe (5 June 1929 – 3 March 2015) was a British Labour Party politician. He was Member of Parliament (MP) for the marginal Middleton and Prestwich constituency from 1966 to 1970, when it was gained by the Conservative Alan Haselhurst.

Coe was born in Whitley Bay, Northumberland. He earned a Scout Silver Medal for Gallantry after saving a young girl from drowning in Cullercoats Bay when he was 14. He served in the armed forces before returning to the North East to begin a career in teaching. He later left the area again to move to London, where he studied economics at the London School of Economics. This triggered his move into politics and he was elected to Middleton and Prestwich as a Labour MP in 1966.

Following the 1970 election, Coe worked in the arts world and went on to establish the British Youth Opera. In 2008, he published his memoirs – Variety Certainly Adds Spice.

Parliament of the United Kingdom
Preceded by Sir John Barlow, Bt.	Member of Parliament for Middleton & Prestwich; 1966 – 1970	Succeeded by Alan Haselhurst
