= Yvonne Paul =

Dutch woman known for living in airport

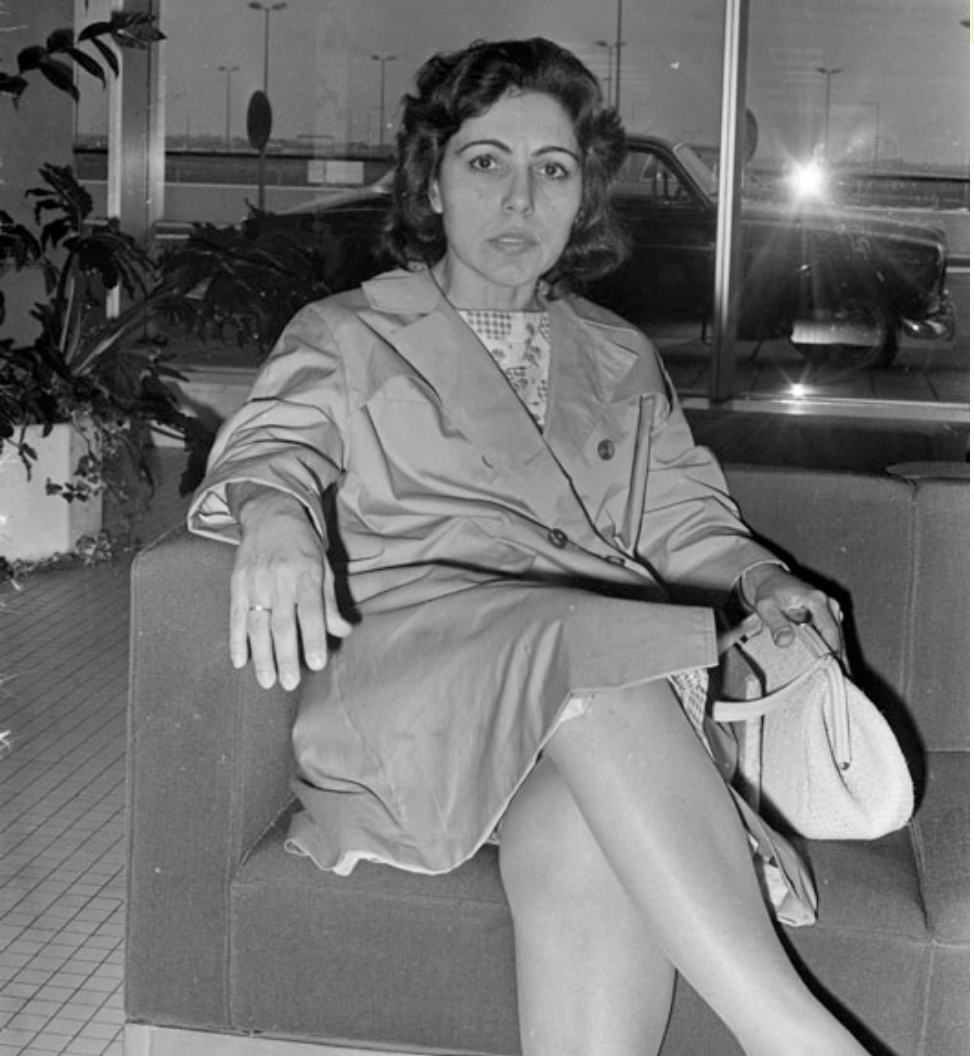
Yvonne Paul (1967)

Yvonne Paul (born 22 March 1929), also known as Yvonne Poghusian, was a Dutch diplomatic staffer, best known for the period of her life where she lived in Schiphol Airport between 11 October 1967 and 5 January 1968. This period was the most notable in multiple attempts to return to the United States, where she had previously worked.

== Personal life ==
Yvonne Paul was born in Manado, a city in modern-day Indonesia but which at the time of her birth was in the Dutch East Indies. She was born to parents of Armenian heritage, though her father opted for Iranian citizenship when Indonesia gained its independence. Manado would be attacked by the Japanese in World War II, and the family spent time in a Japanese-run internment camp. Later on, Yvonne and her parents would move to the Netherlands, where they would attain Dutch citizenship, though she claimed that this was at the behest of her father - Yvonne expressed early on a desire for American citizenship.

Having completed her high-school studies in Amsterdam, she studied languages in Paris, and worked for several years at the Philips branch in Persia. Inspired by a tourist visit to the United States in 1958, Paul successfully applied for a secretarial job at the Dutch Embassy in New York. This role would last until 1964, where her employment (and prior tenancy with a flatmate) ended under circumstances which remain uncertain. Paul's behaviour deteriorated somewhat at this time, which resulted in her voluntary commitment to a psychiatric hospital (though, by her own confession, this was chosen as the alternative to immediate deportation from the US). Though she later managed to attain work, by April 1967, US Immigration Enforcement decided she was no longer entitled to a work visa and deported her for the first time. Reporting at the time suggested that this was the result of Paul's unwillingness to be subject to further psychiatric evaluation by American doctors. At some point after April, Paul attempted to re-enter the United States without the necessary immigration documents, and was deported for a second time on 9 October, having exhausted all legal appeals.

== Stay in Schiphol ==
Having returned on a second KLM flight, on 11 October, Yvonne Paul opted to create temporary accommodation in the Departure Lounge of Schiphol Airport. Her initial expectation that she would soon be able to obtain the legal documents that she required to return to the US, though she was unwilling to accept external support when it was offered to her.

Word quickly spread amongst the airlines and in the national press about a Dutch citizen who was going to great lengths to return to her adoptive homeland. On 23 October, the American Consul-General to the Netherlands (Mr Harold Howland) reminded all flight providers of the financial penalties that would be incurred by facilitating another entry attempt by Paul. By 9 November, greater international attention to this news story began to develop, with coverage in the likes of the New York Herald Tribune, the BBC and CBS News.

Dutch Foreign Minister Joseph Luns attempted to persuade the American authorities of the merits of Yvonne Paul's application for residency permits, though such appeals were ultimately unsuccessful in preventing a second rejection on 17 November. Throughout the course of December, US authorities would go on to re-affirm their decision, and airport authorities prepared to remove Paul from the Departure Lounge as it became increasingly certain that she would never legally re-enter the USA. After refusing a request to vacate voluntarily, on 5 January 1968, Yvonne Paul was arrested and forcibly removed.

Paul was charged with trespassing by the public prosecutor of Haarlem, but was later admitted to Santpoort, a local mental institution. At that time, prosecutor L. H. Feitsma dropped the charges against Paul. Following her discharge from Santpoort on 26 January 1968, the government declined to pursue charges since she did not take up residence again in Schiphol.

Later that year, Paul tried to enter the United States from Paris' Orly Airport. She was unsuccessful, but tried once more to enter the US in December 1968, that time through Switzerland. After a discussion with the Dutch ambassador at Bern, she was returned to the Netherlands with a psychiatrist and psychiatric nurse accompanying her.

== See also ==
- List of people who have lived in airports
