= Sir John Barlow, 2nd Baronet =

British politician

Sir The Lord Barlow

Member of Parliament
- In office 25 October 1951 – 10 March 1966
- Preceded by: Ernest Gates
- Succeeded by: Denis Coe
- Constituency: Middleton and Prestwich
- In office 5 July 1945 – 3 February 1950
- Preceded by: John Loverseed
- Succeeded by: Constituency abolished
- Constituency: Eddisbury

Personal details
- Born: John Denman Barlow; 15 June 1898
- Died: 5 January 1986 (aged 87)
- Party: Conservative (since 1951)
- Other political affiliations: Liberal (before 1929); National Liberal (before 1945)
- Spouse: Helen Diana (m. 1928)
- Children: 4
- Parent: John Barlow (father)
- Education: Leighton Park School

Sir John Denman Barlow, 2nd Baronet (15 June 1898 – 5 January 1986) was a British Conservative Party politician, and before that was a British Liberal Party member.

Barlow was the son of Sir John Barlow, 1st Baronet, and his wife the Hon. Anna Maria Barlow, daughter of Thomas, 3rd Baron Denman. He was educated at Leighton Park School in Reading along with his brother, Thomas, and numerous other well-known Quaker luminaries of the day.

He initially worked in his father's hugely successful Far Eastern Trading business before standing as a Liberal candidate for Northwich in 1929, moving to the National Liberal Party and being elected for Eddisbury in 1945.

After unsuccessfully contesting Walsall in the 1950 election, Barlow was elected at the 1951 general election as Member of Parliament (MP) for Middleton and Prestwich, succeeding the Conservative Ernest Everard Gates. He held his seat at the 1955 election, the 1959 election and the 1964 election, but at the 1966 general election, he was defeated by Labour's Denis Coe.

Barlow married the Hon. Helen Diana, daughter of George Kemp, 1st Baron Rochdale, in 1928. They had three sons and one daughter. He died in January 1986, aged 87, and was succeeded in the baronetcy by his eldest son John. Lady Barlow died the same year.

Coat of arms of Sir John Barlow, 2nd Baronet
Crest A lion sejant affrontée Or holding erect in the forepaws a cross crosslet fitchée Gules. Escutcheon Per pale Ermine and Gules three chevrons counterchanged over all two lions combatant Or. Motto Qui Non Proficit Deficit

== Notes ==
Parliament of the United Kingdom
Preceded by John Eric Loverseed	Member of Parliament for Eddisbury; 1945 – 1950	Constituency abolished
Preceded by Ernest Everard Gates	Member of Parliament for Middleton and Prestwich; 1951 – 1966	Succeeded by Denis Coe
Baronetage of the United Kingdom
Preceded by John Emmott Barlow	Baronet (of Bradwall Hall); 1932–1986	Succeeded by John Kemp Barlow
