= Ernest Gates =

British politician

Ernest Gates MP
- Gates in 1928

Member of Parliament for Middleton and Prestwich
- In office 22 May 1940 – 5 October 1951
- Preceded by: Nairne Stewart Sandeman
- Succeeded by: John Barlow

Personal details
- Born: Ernest Everard Gates; 29 May 1903
- Died: 12 October 1984 (aged 81)
- Party: Conservative
- Education: Corpus Christi College, Cambridge

Major Ernest Everard Gates (29 May 1903 – 12 October 1984) was a British Conservative Party politician. He was a Member of Parliament (MP) for the Middleton and Prestwich constituency in Lancashire from 1940 until he stood down at the 1951 general election.

Gates was educated at Repton and Corpus Christi College, Cambridge (attending both at the same time as Edward Upward and Christopher Isherwood), and before entering parliament was a company director. He won the Middleton and Prestwich seat at a by-election in May 1940, at which his only opponent was a member of the British Union of Fascists. Gates's 98.7% share of the votes remains an all-time record for any parliamentary by-election in the United Kingdom. Despite this, he did not have a good relationship with party activists, and in 1951 he was persuaded to stand down "after criticism from his local [Conservative] association."

== Sources ==
- Craig, F. W. S. (1983) [1969]. British parliamentary election results 1918-1949 (3rd ed.). Chichester: Parliamentary Research Services. ISBN 0-900178-06-X.
- Leigh Rayment's Historical List of MPs
