= Flight (opera) =

English opera in three acts

- Opera by Jonathan Dove
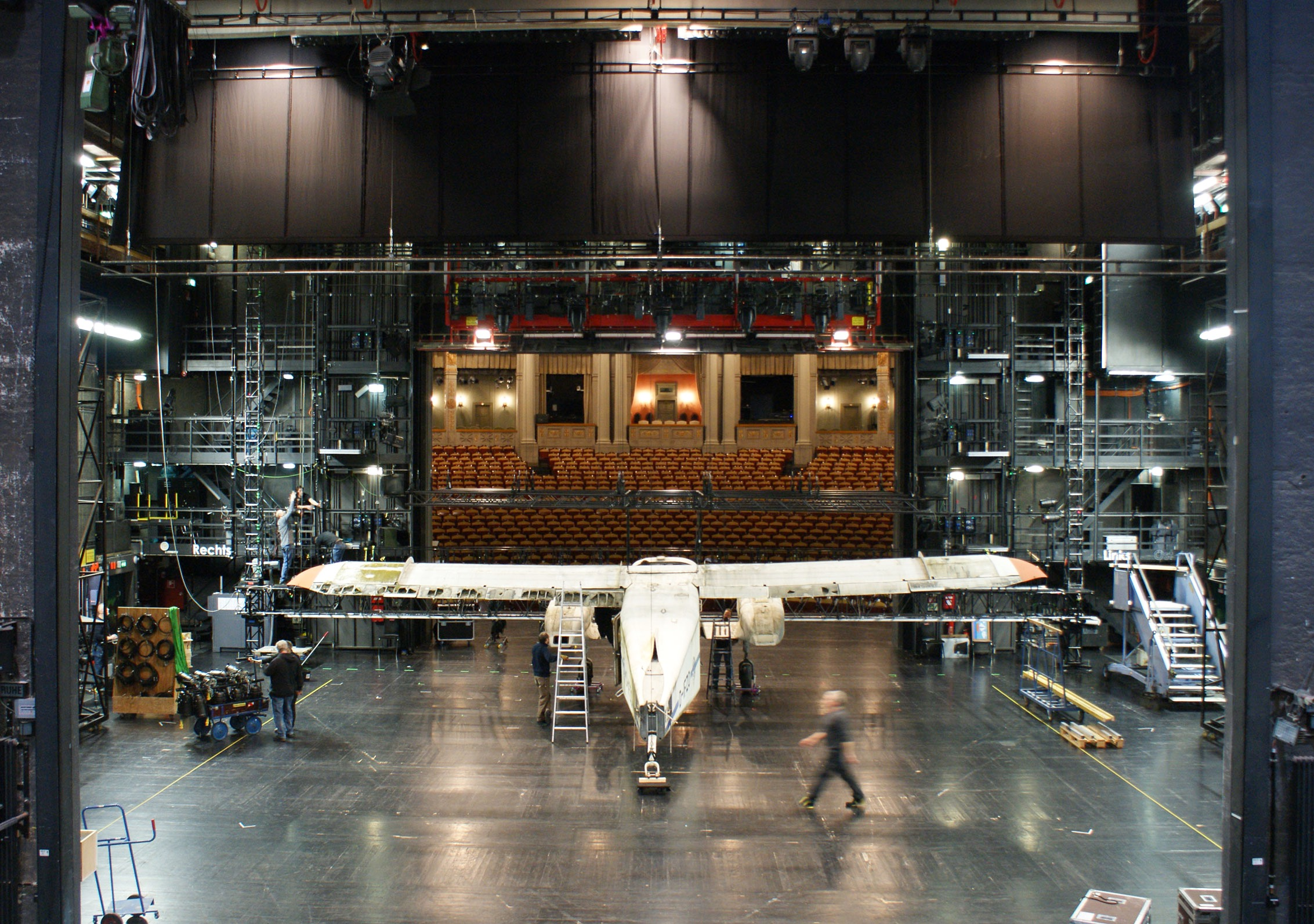
- Backstage at the Prinzregententheater in Munich (2017)
- Librettist: April De Angelis
- Language: English
- Based on: the true-life story of Mehran Karimi Nasseri
- Premiere: 24 September 1998; Glyndebourne Festival Opera

Flight is an English-language opera in three acts, with music by Jonathan Dove and libretto by April De Angelis. Commissioned by Glyndebourne Opera, Glyndebourne Touring Opera premiered the work at Glyndebourne Opera House in a production by Richard Jones on 24 September 1998. It received its Glyndebourne Festival premiere with the original cast at Glyndebourne Festival Opera on 14 August 1999, and was revived at Glyndebourne in August 2005.

De Angelis took part of the inspiration for the plot from the true-life story of Mehran Karimi Nasseri, an Iranian refugee who lived at Charles de Gaulle Airport, Paris, for 18 years, unable to exit the airport terminal. Some of the same real events surrounding Nasseri were later used in the story for the 2004 Steven Spielberg film The Terminal, independently conceived after the opera.

Dove has also arranged music from Flight into an orchestral suite, titled Airport Scenes, for concert performances. This suite was first performed in Warwick on 7 March 2006.

== Roles ==
Role	Voice type	Premiere cast, 24 September 1998 (Conductor: David Parry (conductor))
Refugee	countertenor	Christopher Robson
Controller	soprano	Claron McFadden
Bill	tenor	Richard Coxon
Tina	soprano	Mary Plazas
Stewardess	mezzo-soprano	Ann Taylor
Older Woman	contralto	Nuala Willis
Steward	baritone	Garry Magee
Minskman	baritone	Steven Page
Minskwoman	mezzo-soprano	Anne Mason
Immigration Officer	bass-baritone	Richard Van Allan

== Plot ==
The setting is the departure lounge of an unspecified airport. The opera takes place over the course of one full day and the following morning.

=== Act 1 ===
In the airport, all of the characters are en route somewhere, except for the Controller, the Refugee, and the Immigration Officer. The Refugee cannot leave the airport because he does not have a passport or other documents to allow him to enter the country legally. The Immigration Officer looks for the Refugee in order to arrest him. Married couple Bill and Tina are going on holiday to try to get their relationship out of its routine with the help of a sex manual. The Older Woman, appearing in disguise, has come to the terminal to wait for her "fiancé"—a younger man that has promised to meet her. Minskman is a diplomat relocating for an assignment, and his wife, Minskwoman, is pregnant and on the brink of childbirth. The Stewardess and Steward, when not serving the customers, enjoy a vibrant physical relationship. At the last minute, Minskwoman is afraid to fly, and Minskman goes to his destination without his wife. The Flight Controller warns of approaching storms. The Older Woman's fiancé has not arrived, and Bill and Tina prepare to depart. As Act I closes, all of the characters are suddenly delayed and stranded at the airport because of the inclement weather.

=== Act 2 ===
The time is during the night, just after the storm has "gotten worse" and grounded all the planes. After all the characters have gone to sleep, Bill, in an attempt to break out of his "predictable" nature, makes a pass at the Stewardess, but is shocked to find the Steward instead. The two of them agree to venture up to the heights of the control tower. The Flight Controller grapples with the lack of planes and verbally assaults the storm outside her tower. The Refugee tries to insinuate himself with the various women and gives them (at various points throughout the act) each a "magic stone" that he says will cure their individual travails. The women toast their good fortune and drink with the Refugee. Eventually, as the storm builds, the drunk women realize that the Refugee has given them all the same "magic stone" and turn on him in a fit of rage, knocking him unconscious and concealing his body within a trunk. Up above in the tower, Bill and the Steward engage in an explorative sexual affair.

=== Act 3 ===
It is dawn; the storm has cleared, and every character reels from the events of the previous night. The controller announces the sudden arrival of a plane. Minskman has returned suddenly on the first available flight back, unable to continue without his wife at his side. When Tina learns of Bill's sexual encounter, she is enraged and angrily strikes him with the sex manual, knocking him unconscious as well. The Minskwoman suddenly goes into labor and delivers her baby in the terminal, just as the Refugee awakes from the trunk. The characters, with the insight of newborn life, reflect on the problems in their lives and offer forgiveness to each other for their wrongs. The Immigration Officer finally catches up with the Refugee. The passengers divide into two camps, one demanding the arrest of the Refugee, with the other trying to persuade the Immigration Officer to "review the situation". The Immigration Officer is implacable, citing the need to observe the rules. The Refugee then tells his story, which explains why he has no documentation. His story touches the passengers, and also the Immigration Officer. The officer says that the Refugee cannot leave the terminal, but also that he will "turn a blind eye" and not arrest him.

With the storm cleared, Minskman and Minskwoman, with their new baby, fly to his new mission. Tina, taking the opportunity to start fresh with her husband Bill, go to their respective vacation destination. The Older Woman decides to venture out on a flight herself. The Steward and Stewardess make amends, each working on their respective flights. The opera ends with an enigmatic inquiry from the Controller to the Refugee.

== Recording ==
The opera has been recorded commercially for Chandos, taken from the live Channel 4 television broadcast from Glyndebourne.

== Selected list of stagings ==
Date	Venue	Company	Notes
24 September 1998	Glyndebourne Opera House	Glyndebourne Touring Opera	World premiere, production by Richard Jones
1999	Glyndebourne Opera House	Glyndebourne Festival Opera	Festival premiere with original cast, production by Richard Jones
November 2001	Rabotheater Hengelo	Nationale Reisopera	Netherlands stage premiere, production by Richard Jones
February 2002	Flanders Opera (Vlaamse Opera)	Vlaamse Opera, Ghent	Belgium stage premiere, production by Richard Jones
8 June 2003	Webster University	Opera Theatre of Saint Louis	First US performance, production directed by Colin Graham.
April 2004	Opernhaus, Leipzig	Leipzig Opera	First German production (sung in German translation)
2005	Glyndebourne	Glyndebourne Festival Opera	Revival
2005	Shubert Theatre (Boston), Massachusetts	Boston Lyric Opera	production directed by Colin Graham
3 March 2006	Adelaide Festival Theatre, Adelaide Festival, Australia	Glyndebourne Opera	Australian premiere, production by Richard Jones, under the artistic direction of Brett Sheehy, winner of Australia's 2006 Helpmann Award for Best Opera.
January 2008	CAPA Theater in Pittsburgh, Pennsylvania	Pittsburgh Opera Center	Performance by the resident and guest artists of the Pittsburgh Opera, directed by Kristine McIntyre
September 2008	Peacock Theatre, London	British Youth Opera	Production directed by Martin Lloyd-Evans
April 2011	Long Center in Austin, Texas	Austin Lyric Opera	Directed by Kristine McIntyre
May 2015	Gerald W. Lynch Theater, New York	Mannes Opera	New York premiere
June 2015	Holland Park Theatre, London	Opera Holland Park	London professional premiere staged by Stephen Barlow (director)
November 2015	Boston Conservatory Theater, Boston, Massachusetts	Boston Conservatory	Jonathan Pape, director
February 2017	Yerba Buena Center for the Arts, San Francisco	Opera Parallèle	Nicole Paiement, artistic director/conductor; Brian Staufenbiel, creative director
February 2017	Prinzregententheater, Munich, Germany	Theaterakademie August Everding	First German production of the original English version
April 2017	Orpheum Theatre (Omaha), Nebraska	Opera Omaha	James Darrah, director; Christopher Rountree, conductor
February 2018	Theatre Royal, Glasgow and Edinburgh Festival Theatre	Scottish Opera	Director: Stephen Barlow; designer: Andrew Riley; lighting designer: Richard Howell
March 2018	Susie Sainsbury Theatre	Royal Academy of Music	Director: Martin Duncan; conductor: Gareth Hancock; designer: Francis O'Connor
July 2018	Blank Performing Arts Center (Indianola, Iowa)	Des Moines Metro Opera	Kristine McIntyre, director; David Neely, conductor
April 2021	Museum of Flight, Tukwila, Washington	Seattle Opera	Brian Staufenbiel, director; Viswa Subbaraman, conductor
January 2022	Capitol Theatre (Salt Lake City), Salt Lake City, Utah	Utah Opera	Director: Kristine McIntyre, Conductor: Robert Tweten
March 2022	Royal Conservatoire of Scotland, New Athenaeum Theatre, Glasgow	Royal Conservatoire of Scotland	James Bonas, Director
June 2022	Royal College of Music, Kensington, London	Royal College of Music	Jeremy Sams, Director
September 2023	Oldenburgisches Staatstheater, Oldenburg (Oldb), Germany	Oldenburgisches Staatstheater	Director: Kobie van Rensburg; Conductor: Vito Cristofaro
April 2026	Boston University, Tsai Performance Center	Boston University College of Fine Arts, School of Music	Director: Cara Consilvio Conductor: William Lumpkin

== See also ==
- List of people who have lived at airports
- Lost in Transit, 1993 film
- The Terminal, 2004 film
- Eve Bunting, whose illustrated 1991 children's book Fly Away Home is about a homeless man and his son who live in an airport
