= Ryland Adkins =

English politician (1862–1925)

Ryland Adkins

Sir William Ryland Dent Adkins (11 May 1862 – 30 January 1925) was an English barrister, judge and Liberal Party politician.

== Family and education ==
Ryland Adkins, as he was known at least professionally, was the son of William Adkins JP of Springfield, Northampton and his wife Harriet (née Dent) of the Manor House, Milton, Northampton. He was educated at Mill Hill School, University College London where he obtained a BA degree and Balliol College, Oxford where he won a History Exhibition. He was an ardent Free churchman and was an active member of the Congregational Union.

== Career ==
Adkins studied for the law and in 1890 was called to the Bar by the Inner Temple. He practised on the Midland circuit, took silk in 1920 and sat occasionally as a Commissioner of Assize. He served as Recorder of Nottingham from 1911 to 1920. From 1920 until his death he sat as Recorder of Birmingham. He was knighted in 1911.

== Politics ==
=== Northamptonshire politics ===
Adkins was an original member of Northamptonshire County Council at its creation in 1889. He was for many years its vice chairman and became chairman of the County Council in 1920. He was also vice-chairman of the Northamptonshire Territorial Force Association and played an important role in recruiting during the First World War. He later served as chairman of the executive council of the Association of County Councils. He was created deputy lieutenant of Northamptonshire in 1922 and served for many as a JP for the county and Borough of Northampton. Adkins was proud of his Northamptonshire heritage and was the author of a book about the county in 1893 and a contributor to a number of others including the Victoria History of the County.

=== Parliament ===
Adkins was first elected to Parliament at the 1906 general election as Liberal MP for Middleton, Lancashire in a straight fight with the Unionists by a majority of 1,533 votes.

General election January 1906: Middleton Electorate 14,314
Party	Candidate	Votes	%	±%
Liberal	Ryland Adkins	7,018	56.1	+
Conservative	Cyril CH Potter	5,485	43.9	−
Majority		1,533	12.2	
Turnout			87.3	
Liberal gain from Conservative		Swing	+	

He held the seat in the January 1910 general election.

General election January 1910: Middleton Electorate 15,391
Party	Candidate	Votes	%	±%
Liberal	Ryland Adkins	7,669	55.0	−1.1
Conservative	Patrick Rose-Innes	6,266	45.0	+1.1
Majority		1,403	10.0	−2.2
Turnout			90.5	+3.2
Liberal hold		Swing	-1.1	

Adkins held his seat again in a straight fight against a Liberal Unionist candidate, this time with a majority of 1,403 and in December 1910 with a majority of 787.

General election December 1910: Middleton Electorate 15,391
Party	Candidate	Votes	%	±%
Liberal	Ryland Adkins	7,071	52.9	−2.1
Liberal Unionist	William Hewins	6,284	47.1	+2.1
Majority		787	5.8	−4.2
Turnout			86.8	−3.7
Liberal hold		Swing	-2.1	

=== Middleton by-election, 1911 ===
In 1911 upon his appointment as Recorder of Nottingham, Adkins was obliged by the electoral law of the day to resign his seat and re-contest it at a by-election held on 2 August 1911. His candidature was opposed by the Conservatives. W A S Hewins who was his opponent at the December 1910 general election and who had reduced his majority from 1,403 votes in January 1910 to 787 in December, stood against him again. The by-election was fought mainly on the issue of National Insurance which Hewins took up vigorously, if by some accounts rather cynically. In the course of the campaign Lloyd George had to send Adkins a letter for public consumption refuting in detail Hewins' claims. Despite the strong attack however Adkins held on, although Hewins reduced his majority again, this time to 411 votes.

1911 Middleton by-election Electorate 15,447
Party	Candidate	Votes	%	±%
Liberal	Sir Ryland Adkins	6,863	51.5	−1.4
Liberal Unionist	William Hewins	6,452	48.5	+1.4
Majority		411	3.0	−2.8
Turnout			86.2	−0.6
Liberal hold		Swing	-1.4	

=== The Marconi Scandal ===
Adkins played a cameo role in the Marconi scandal which broke in the summer of 1912. It was alleged that highly placed members of H H Asquith's Liberal government, notably Lloyd George and Rufus Isaacs, had profited by improper use of information about the Government's intentions with respect to the Marconi Company. Knowing that the government was about to issue a lucrative contract to the British Marconi company, they had bought shares in an American subsidiary. In the end Parliament did not wish to see these ministers brought down over their involvement in an affair from which they had not profited unduly and it was their political judgment rather than their honour which was questioned. Adkins was chosen by the government Whips to move an amendment to a motion of censure on the issue which accepted the ministers' expressions of regret and acquitted them of acting in bad faith and of charges of corruption.

=== 1918 General Election ===
The 1918 general election was known as the 'coupon election' after the letter of endorsement sent to candidates supporting the coalition government of David Lloyd George. Adkins had been regarded as supporter of H H Asquith during the war and in the split in the Liberal Party occasioned by Lloyd George's replacement of Asquith as prime minister. He opposed the introduction of conscription and he voted with Asquith and against Lloyd George in the Maurice Debate of May 1918. Despite all this he received the Coalition 'coupon' for the 1918 general election and thereafter acted in Parliament as a Lloyd George Liberal. Adkins' Middleton seat had disappeared in a boundary revision for this election and he had been adopted as Liberal candidate for the new Middleton and Prestwich constituency. As a result of receiving the 'coupon' Adkins did not face a Conservative opponent at the general election and held his seat comfortably with a majority of 8,330 over Labour.

=== Middleton and Prestwich by-election, 1920 ===
Adkins had to go through the by-election process again in 1920 on his appointment as Recorder of Birmingham. At this by-election however he was returned unopposed as a result of an electoral truce called because of an outbreak of smallpox in Middleton and the recommendation of the medical authorities that door to door canvassing and public meetings should be avoided.

=== 1922–1924 ===
In 1922, Adkins fought Middleton and Prestwich as a National Liberal. Although Lloyd George had been ousted as prime minister as a result of the decision of Conservative MPs at the Carlton Club meeting of 19 October 1922 to withdraw from the coalition, Adkins did not face Unionist opposition in 1922. In a straight fight with Labour candidate Matthew Burrow Farr, he held the seat by a majority of 4,327 votes.

By the time of the 1923 general election however, things had changed. A degree of Liberal reunion had taken place with both the Lloyd George and Asquithian wings of the party agreeing to fight the election together in defence of the traditional Liberal policy of Free Trade which the new prime minister Stanley Baldwin had chosen to be the central issue in the campaign. The Tories had recovered their organisation in Middleton and they adopted Sir Nairne Stewart-Sandeman as their candidate. Adkins was also opposed again by Farr for Labour and in a close three-cornered fight he just failed to hold his seat by the margin of 529 votes (or 1.9% of the poll). Stewart-Sandeman's victory was the first recorded Conservative gain of the election.

Adkins attempted to regain the seat at the 1924 general election. But by this time the electorate was increasingly coming to see British politics through its traditional two-party lens, with the realistic choice for government being between Conservative or Labour parties. In a three-cornered contest with Stewart-Sandeman and Farr, Adkins came bottom of the poll with 21.7% of the votes cast.

== Other public appointments ==
During his political career Adkins served on many different committees and public inquiries as an appointee of the government. The following are examples of his more important commissions.

=== Drunkenness law ===
In 1908 he was appointed by the Home Secretary to sit on a committee to investigate the operation of the law in relation to inebriates (drunkenness).

=== Isle of Man constitution ===
In 1911 he was appointed a member of the Home Office Committee of Inquiry into the constitutional crisis in the Isle of Man, which arose out of dispute between the Lieutenant Governor of the Isle of Man, the Island's Legislative Council and the British Home Office on the one side and the members of the House of Keys on the other, on the question of where responsibility for the passing of money bills should sit, with the Keys asserting primacy as the elected representatives of the Manx people.

=== Electoral Reform ===
Adkins also sat as a member of the Speaker's Conference on Electoral Reform of 1917–1918, which looked amongst other things at the proposals for votes for women which came into effect for the 1918 general election. The conference also proposed the ending of plural voting and the introduction of proportional representation in large urban areas but these were among the recommendations not introduced.

=== Pensions ===
In 1919 Adkins was appointed chairman of a committee set up to look at the operation of the statutory scheme of Old Age Pensions. The proceedings of the committee were open and public, ensuring the evidence of the witnesses concerning the poor social and economic circumstances of pensioners was placed squarely in the public domain. As a result of the committee's recommendations the pension increased to 10 shillings a week and various conditions of qualifications were relaxed in favour of applicants, including the raising of income limits, with the effect that around 220,000 additional pensioners came onto the books.

=== Federal Devolution ===
Also in 1919 Adkins was a member of the Commission on Federal Devolution which looked at the implications of Irish Home Rule. Adkins seemed to be especially interested in this issue of devolution and led or was a member of different deputations to the prime minister to promote home rule all round. In 1921 he backed a Parliamentary Bill to devolve certain powers from the Westminster government to subordinate Parliaments in England, Scotland and Wales.

=== Others ===
In 1924, he was appointed chairman of a committee established to investigate offences against children and also served as a member of the royal commission on Local Government

== Death ==
Adkins died at his home at Springfield, Northampton of gastric influenza on 30 January 1925, at the age of 62.

== Publications ==
- Author of Our County: Sketches in Pen and Ink of Representative Men of Northamptonshire. London: Elliott Stock. 1893.
- Introductory chapter in Markham, C.A, ed. (1898). The Records of the Borough of Northampton. Northampton: Corporation of Northampton.
- Introduction to Culross, James (1897). The Three Rylands: A Hundred Years of Various Christian Service. London: Elliott Stock.
- Co-editor (with R.M. Serjeantson): A History of the County of Northampton. Victoria County History. Vol. 1. Westminster: Archibald Constable & Co. 1902.
- Co-editor (with R.M. Serjeantson): A History of the County of Northampton. Victoria County History. Vol. 2. Westminster: Archibald Constable & Co. 1906.

Parliament of the United Kingdom
Preceded by Edward Fielden	Member of Parliament for Middleton; 1906–1918	Constituency abolished
New constituency	Member of Parliament for Middleton & Prestwich; 1918–1923	Succeeded by Nairne Stewart Sandeman
