= Matthew Burrow Farr =

British trade unionist and Labour Party politician

Matthew Burrow Farr (1862 – 31 December 1941) was a British trade unionist and Labour Party politician.

Farr worked in the cotton industry in Mossley, and he became the secretary of the Mossley Card and Blowing Room Operatives' Association at an early age. He was a supporter of the Colne Valley Labour Union, and then became one of the first members of the Independent Labour Party (ILP). He and stood for the district council in the Yorkshire ward in 1893, and again in 1895, when he became the first independent labour councillor in the town. He became an alderman in 1899, and then in 1914 was elected as Mayor of Mossley. By this time, he was a member of the executive of the Amalgamated Association of Card and Blowing Room Operatives (Cardroom Amalgamation), to which his Mossley union was affiliated. He also became increasingly prominent in the Labour Party, to which the ILP was affiliated, and in 1921 was elected to its National Executive Committee, serving for two years.

The Cardroom Amalgamation was a member of the United Textile Factory Workers' Association, and this organisation was keen to sponsor Labour Parliamentary candidates. In 1919, he was firstly adopted as its Prospective Parliamentary Candidate for Stalybridge and Hyde. Later in the year, he was instead adopted in Oldham, but Farr instead decided to contest Middleton and Prestwich. The party planned to stand him in the 1920 Middleton and Prestwich by-election, but due to a serious outbreak of smallpox in the town, the local party decided it best to leave the seat uncontested.

Farr first stood in Middleton and Prestwich at the 1922 United Kingdom general election, taking 41.5% of the vote. When he was again a candidate in the 1923 United Kingdom general election, the Manchester Guardian described him as "... a well-known and popular leader of the cotton operatives, [who] will undoubtedly secure a heavy following" in the Chadderton and Middleton areas of the seat. Despite this, he took third place, and despite moving back into second, he again failed to win in 1924 and 1929.

In 1919, Farr was elected to Lancashire County Council, and in 1929 became an alderman on that body. He finally stood in Oldham at the 1935 United Kingdom general election, taking fourth place in the two-seat constituency. He remained in his trade union and council posts until his death, late in 1941, at the age of 79.
