= Middleton (constituency) =

Parliamentary constituency in the United Kingdom, 1885–1918

- Former county constituency for the House of Commons

1885–1918
- Seats: one
- Created from: South East Lancashire
- Replaced by: Middleton and Prestwich

Middleton was a county constituency in the county of Lancashire of the House of Commons for the Parliament of the United Kingdom. Created by the Redistribution of Seats Act 1885, it was represented by one Member of Parliament. The constituency was abolished in 1918.

== Members of Parliament ==
| Election | Member | Party |
|---|---|---|
| 1885 | George Salis-Schwabe | Liberal |
| 1886 | George Salis-Schwabe | Liberal Unionist |
| 1886 | Thomas Fielden | Conservative |
| 1892 | Charles Henry Hopwood | Liberal |
| 1895 | Thomas Fielden | Conservative |
| 1897 b-e | James Duckworth | Liberal |
| 1900 | Edward Fielden | Conservative |
| 1906 | Ryland Adkins | Liberal |
| 1918 | Constituency abolished | |

== Boundaries ==
The Redistribution of Seats Act 1885 provided that the constituency was to consist of "The Sessional Division of Middleton (except so much of the Parish of Spotland as is included in Division No. 10 as herein described, or in the Municipal Borough of Bacup), the Municipal Borough of Rochdale, and the Parishes of Alkrington and Tonge, and in the Sessional Division of Bury so much of the Parish of Hopwood as is not included in the Municipal Borough of Heywood."

== Elections ==
=== Elections in the 1880s ===
General election 1885: Middleton
| Party | Candidate | Votes | % | ±% |
|---|---|---|---|---|
| Liberal | George Salis-Schwabe | 5,882 | 54.6 | |
| Conservative | Thomas Fielden | 4,885 | 45.4 | |
| Majority | | 997 | 9.2 | |
| Turnout | | 10,767 | 91.6 | |
| Registered electors | | 11,748 | | |
| Liberal win (new seat) | | | | |

Thomas Fielden

General election 1886: Middleton
| Party | Candidate | Votes | % | ±% |
|---|---|---|---|---|
| Conservative | Thomas Fielden | 5,126 | 51.6 | +6.2 |
| Liberal | Charles Henry Hopwood | 4,808 | 48.4 | −6.2 |
| Majority | | 318 | 3.2 | N/A |
| Turnout | | 9,934 | 84.6 | −7.0 |
| Registered electors | | 11,748 | | |
| Conservative gain from Liberal | | Swing | +6.2 | |

=== Elections in the 1890s ===
General election 1892: Middleton
| Party | Candidate | Votes | % | ±% |
|---|---|---|---|---|
| Liberal | Charles Henry Hopwood | 5,389 | 50.5 | +2.1 |
| Conservative | Thomas Fielden | 5,273 | 49.5 | −2.1 |
| Majority | | 116 | 1.0 | N/A |
| Turnout | | 10,662 | 89.2 | +4.6 |
| Registered electors | | 11,951 | | |
| Liberal gain from Conservative | | Swing | +2.1 | |

General election 1895: Middleton
| Party | Candidate | Votes | % | ±% |
|---|---|---|---|---|
| Conservative | Thomas Fielden | 5,926 | 53.9 | +4.4 |
| Liberal | Charles Henry Hopwood | 5,061 | 46.1 | −4.4 |
| Majority | | 865 | 7.8 | N/A |
| Turnout | | 10,987 | 88.3 | −0.9 |
| Registered electors | | 12,446 | | |
| Conservative gain from Liberal | | Swing | +4.4 | |

Fielden's death caused a by-election.

J. Duckworth

1897 Middleton by-election
| Party | Candidate | Votes | % | ±% |
|---|---|---|---|---|
| Liberal | James Duckworth | 5,964 | 51.3 | +5.2 |
| Conservative | William Mitchell | 5,664 | 48.7 | −5.2 |
| Majority | | 300 | 2.6 | N/A |
| Turnout | | 11,628 | 89.8 | +1.5 |
| Registered electors | | 12,945 | | |
| Liberal gain from Conservative | | Swing | +5.2 | |

=== Elections in the 1900s ===
General election 1900: Middleton
| Party | Candidate | Votes | % | ±% |
|---|---|---|---|---|
| Conservative | Edward Fielden | 6,147 | 50.6 | −3.3 |
| Liberal | James Duckworth | 6,011 | 49.4 | +3.3 |
| Majority | | 136 | 1.2 | −6.6 |
| Turnout | | 12,158 | 88.7 | +0.4 |
| Registered electors | | 13,707 | | |
| Conservative hold | | Swing | −3.3 | |

Potter

General election January 1906: Middleton
| Party | Candidate | Votes | % | ±% |
|---|---|---|---|---|
| Liberal | Ryland Adkins | 7,018 | 56.1 | +6.7 |
| Conservative | Cyril Potter | 5,485 | 43.9 | −6.7 |
| Majority | | 1,533 | 12.2 | N/A |
| Turnout | | 12,503 | 87.3 | −1.4 |
| Registered electors | | 14,314 | | |
| Liberal gain from Conservative | | Swing | +6.7 | |

=== Elections in the 1910s ===
Ryland Adkins

General election January 1910: Middleton
| Party | Candidate | Votes | % | ±% |
|---|---|---|---|---|
| Liberal | Ryland Adkins | 7,669 | 55.0 | −1.1 |
| Conservative | Patrick Rose-Innes | 6,266 | 45.0 | +1.1 |
| Majority | | 1,403 | 10.0 | −2.2 |
| Turnout | | 13,935 | 90.5 | +3.2 |
| Liberal hold | | Swing | -1.1 | |

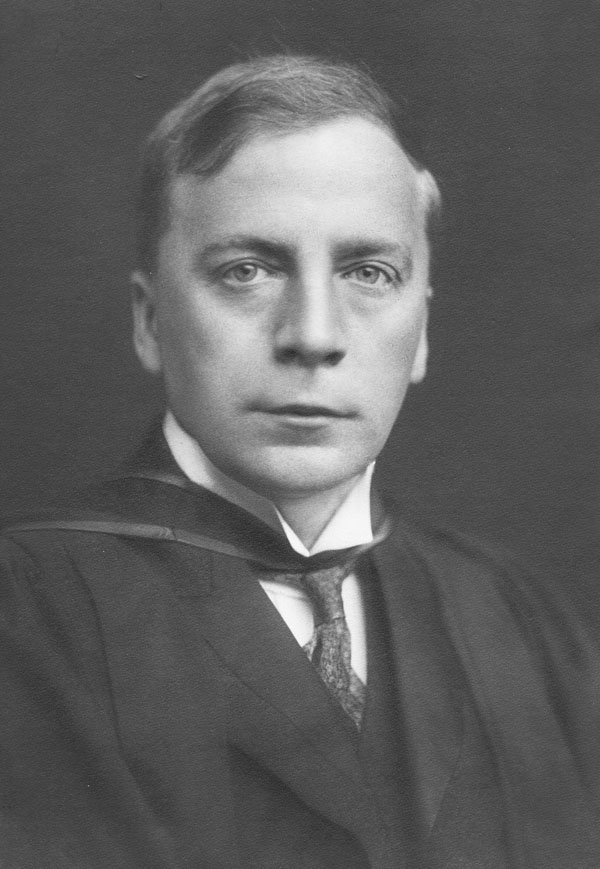
William Hewins

General election December 1910: Middleton
| Party | Candidate | Votes | % | ±% |
|---|---|---|---|---|
| Liberal | Ryland Adkins | 7,071 | 52.9 | −2.1 |
| Liberal Unionist | William Hewins | 6,284 | 47.1 | +2.1 |
| Majority | | 787 | 5.8 | −4.2 |
| Turnout | | 13,355 | 86.8 | −3.7 |
| Liberal hold | | Swing | -2.1 | |

Adkins was appointed Recorder of Nottingham and required to seek re-election.

1911 Middleton by-election
| Party | Candidate | Votes | % | ±% |
|---|---|---|---|---|
| Liberal | Ryland Adkins | 6,863 | 51.5 | −1.4 |
| Liberal Unionist | William Hewins | 6,452 | 48.5 | +1.4 |
| Majority | | 411 | 3.0 | −2.8 |
| Turnout | | 13,315 | 86.2 | −0.6 |
| Liberal hold | | Swing | -1.4 | |

General Election 1914–15:

Another General Election was required to take place before the end of 1915. The political parties had been making preparations for an election to take place and by July 1914, the following candidates had been selected;

- Liberal: Ryland Adkins
- Unionist: Bernard Townroe
