= List of people who have lived in airports =

List of people who have lived in an airport for more than one week

This is a list of people notable for living for periods of more than a week in airports. The reasons are usually protesting, asylum seeking or having difficulty with visas and passports.

== List of residents ==
Currently in the airport

This is a list of notable people who have been living in airports around the world.

Name	Profile	Original nationality	Location	Period	Duration
Khasan Aman Abdo, Gulistan Issa Shakho, and four children		Syrian	Sheremetyevo International Airport, Moscow, Russia	10 September 2015 – 20 November 2015	71 days
Family of Kurdish refugees fleeing the Iraqi Civil War who intended to seek asylum in Russia. After being initially denied entry into the country, they remained at the airport. The family was moved to a facility for temporary accommodation while they awaited further processing of their asylum application.
Mohammed Al Bahish		Iraqi-Palestinian	Almaty International Airport, Almaty, Kazakhstan	20 March – 17 August 2013	150 days
In Kazakhstan, while registering intention to marry, Al Bahish's refugee travel documents went missing, and his Kazakh and Emirati visas expired. Later he flew to Turkey in the hope of renewing his Kazakh visa, but was turned back at the border. Subsequently, he was flown back and forth four times and refused entry by either country. He was allowed to go to a UNHRC refugee transit centre in Timișoara, Romania, and later granted asylum in Finland.
Hassan Al Kontar		Syrian	Kuala Lumpur International Airport, Sepang, Malaysia	7 March – 1 October 2018	208 days
Al Kontar was deported to Malaysia in 2017 after overstaying in the UAE for 5 years. During his stay, he saved money to buy a plane ticket to Ecuador, but was turned away by Turkish Airlines staff for unexplained reasons. He then attempted to fly to Cambodia after overstaying his Malaysian visa, but was denied entry and deported. He was briefly detained by Malaysian immigration authorities for two months, until his asylum request was granted by the Canadian government.
Arwa Almsrawi		Syrian	Istanbul Airport, Istanbul, Turkey	February 2024 – September 2024	240 days (approx. 8 months; exact dates unknown)
Almsrawi was prevented from embarking on a flight to Toronto after landing in Turkey due to US authorities alleging she was on the American No Fly List. The Canadian Government later revoked her refugee status. She was given temporary Turkish residence.
Gary Peter Austin		British	Ninoy Aquino International Airport, Philippines	19 December 2012 – 11 January 2013	23 days
Austin missed his flight. He had run out of money to book a new flight. Donors paid for a ticket back to the United Kingdom.
Bahareh Zare Bahari		Iranian	Ninoy Aquino International Airport, Manila	17 October – 6 November 2019	20 days
Bahari was detained upon return to the Philippines from a trip to Dubai after Iran sought her via an Interpol Red Notice. The Philippine justice department recognized Bahari as a refugee on 6 November.
Iyad El-Baghdadi		Palestinian	Kuala Lumpur International Airport, Malaysia	13 May – 8 June 2014	26 days
El-Baghdadi was deported to Malaysia by the UAE, not wanting to be detained there indefinitely without formal charges. He was then denied entry at the Kuala Lumpur airport because he had no official documents. The Palestinian Embassy issued him a passport, and officials in Kuala Lumpur admitted him into the country. He then left Malaysia for Norway, applying for political asylum.
Feng Zhenghu		Chinese	Narita International Airport, Japan	9 November 2009 – 3 February 2010	86 days
Feng began protesting after being refused re-entry into China. He was visited by several Chinese diplomats and entered Japan with anticipation of being allowed to re-enter Shanghai by mid-February. This later occurred, although he is now under house-arrest at his Shanghai apartment.
Déo Hasabumutima		Burundian	Istanbul Airport, Istanbul, Turkey	16 June 2021 – 7 July 2021	21 days
On a transit from Niamey, Niger, Hasabumutima was refused boarding on a flight to Toronto, Canada because his Burundian passport was expired, despite possessing a valid Canadian permanent resident card. He received assistance from the Canadian authorities.
Zahra Kamalfar		Iranian	Sheremetyevo International Airport, Russia	May–June 2006 – 15 March 2007	258–318 days
Kamalfar fled persecution in Iran with her family using falsified documents to seek asylum in Canada via Germany and Russia. The documents were rejected by German authorities and she was returned to Russia. The Canadian government granted asylum.
Ahmed Kannan		Palestinian	Kuala Lumpur International Airport, Sepang, Malaysia	21 May – 13 July 2013	53 days
Kannan arrived without a passport because it had been confiscated in Turkey. After having overstayed in May 2013 in Malaysia, he had flown from Kuala Lumpur to Turkey, but without a visa. His passport was seized by Turkish immigration and he was deported back to Kuala Lumpur. He was released on 13 July 2013, granted a 30-day Malaysian visa on humanitarian grounds.
Arlen Khadaa		Kyrgyzstani-Soviet	Manas International Airport, Bishkek, Kyrgyzstan	19 January 2019 – 8 October 2020	628 days
Khadaa lost Soviet citizenship at the dissolution of the USSR. He was refused a Norwegian residence permit and citizenship and returned to Kyrgyzstan. He was sent to Norway on 8 October 2020. He is the subject of the 2023 Norwegian documentary film Flyplassmannen (The Airport Man).
Denis Luiz de Souza		Brazilian	São Paulo–Guarulhos International Airport, Brazil	c. 2000 – present	9793 days (approx. 25–26 years; exact dates unknown)
De Souza had frequent conflicts at home, deciding to take refuge in the airport. He seems to suffer from psychological problems. He still lives in the airport, but comes out occasionally.
Eissa Muhamad		Nigerien	Addis Ababa International Airport	November 2018 – August 2019	300 days (approx.; exact dates unknown)
Muhamad was expelled from Israel after being caught without proper documents. On his way back to Niger, he transited to Addis Ababa. Niger refused to let him in, claiming the temporary travel documents were fake. He got stuck in Addis Ababa, where neither Israel nor Niger would take him back. He is now living in Senegal.
Heinz Müller		German	Viracopos-Campinas International Airport, Brazil	16–29 October 2009	13 days
Müller flew to Rio de Janeiro to meet with a woman he met online, who did not show up. He ran out of money and ended up in Campinas. He was taken to a hospital for a psychological evaluation.
Mehran Karimi Nasseri		Iranian	Charles de Gaulle Airport, France	26 August 1988 – July 2006; Mid-September – 12 November 2022	6518–6548 days (17.84–17.93 years); Up to 60 days on the second stay
Originally from Iran, Nasseri was given refugee status by UNHCR and claimed that his documents were stolen in Paris en route to the United Kingdom. He was refused entry and declined new papers due to changing his own name and place of birth. He became homeless again in 2022 and died later that year of a heart attack. He was hospitalised, put up in a hotel by the Red Cross and then moved to Paris by Emmaus. During his second stay, he died of a heart attack.
Hiroshi Nohara		Japanese	Mexico City International Airport, Mexico	2 September – 28 December 2008	117 days
Nohara declined to give his reasons. He left with a woman identified as Oyuki.
Yvonne Paul		Dutch	Amsterdam Airport Schiphol, Netherlands	11 October 1967 – 5 January 1968	86 days
Paul previously lived in the USA, and had been deported as a result of expiring immigration documents. She set up a temporary base in Schiphol Airport whilst attempting to get new immigration documents. After a formal request to vacate was ignored, she was arrested on 5 January 1968.
Sanjay Shah (former Kenyan national)		Kenyan	Jomo Kenyatta International Airport	June 2004 – July 2005	395 days (approx. 13 months; exact dates unknown)
Shah spent 13 months living in the duty-free section of Nairobi's Jomo Kenyatta International Airport, petitioning for full British citizenship. This was eventually granted on the grounds that he had already given up his former Kenyan citizenship.
Aditya Singh		Indian	O'Hare International Airport, Chicago, United States	19 October 2020 – 16 January 2021	89 days
Singh decided not to take his connecting flight to India due to fear of COVID-19. He was arrested in January 2021, but cleared of charges in late 2021.
Edward Snowden		American	Sheremetyevo International Airport, Moscow, Russia	23 June – 1 August 2013	39 days
While on a flight to Moscow-Sheremetyevo, authorities revoked Snowden's U.S. passport. He was granted temporary asylum in Russia. He later received Russian citizenship.
Bayram Tepeli		Turkish	Atatürk Airport	1991–2019	9862 days (approx. 27 years; exact dates unknown)
Bayram Tepeli		Turkish	Sabiha Gokcen Airport	2019–present	1825 days
Tepeli ran away from family problems and worked at the airport for a while. Eventually he became sick, and could not work anymore, but decided to keep living at the airport. The airport closed for commercial passenger travel in 2019, so he had to leave. He now lives in Sabiha Gökçen Airport.
Abo Tetsuya		Japanese	Sheremetyevo International Airport, Moscow, Russia	29 May 2015 – 9 August 2015	72 days
Tetsuya claimed to be a journalist, and that his seeking asylum was politically motivated. He hoped to receive Russian citizenship. He was denied political asylum in Russia.
Wei Jianguo		Chinese	Beijing Capital International Airport	c. 2008 – present	6871 days (approx. 17–18 years; exact dates unknown)
Wei wanted to smoke and drink without his family bothering him. He also had difficulty finding work. He still lives in the airport, but comes out occasionally.
Lisa Lee Wink		Canadian	Cancún International Airport, Cancún, Mexico	13 April 2023 – 15 May 2023	32 days
Unknown Wink was deported for aggressive behavior against other passengers.
Yan Kefen and Liu Xinglian		Chinese	Taoyuan International Airport, Republic of China	27 September 2018 – 30 January 2019	125 days
Yan and Liu were trying to seek asylum in Taiwan during their transit, but they were refused for entry while their asylum applications were being considered by Taiwanese authorities. They were allowed to enter Taiwan on 30 January 2019. They were finally admitted into Canada in May and July, respectively.
Edgard Ziebart		German	Indira Gandhi International Airport, Delhi	18 March – 12 May 2020	55 days
Ziebart was prevented from embarking on the last leg of his flight when India imposed restrictions amid the coronavirus crisis. He refused German embassy evacuation flights, fearing prosecution for criminal offences. He left on a KLM repatriation flight to Amsterdam and was later extradited back to Germany.

== See also ==
- International zone
- Statelessness
- Lost in Transit, 1993 film
- Flight, 1998 opera
- The Terminal, 2004 film
- Edward Snowden
- Edward Snowden asylum in Russia
