= British Youth Opera =

- Abbreviation: BYO
- Established: 1987
- Founder: Denis Coe
- Type: Opera company
- Legal status: Charity
- Headquarters: London Coliseum
- Website: byo.org.uk

British Youth Opera (BYO) is the United Kingdom's national opera training company, helping young singers, directors, designers, stage managers and music staff build careers in the opera industry.

== History ==
British Youth Opera was started by British MP Denis Coe in 1987, to give high-standard performance opportunities to singers straight out of music college. Coe was a member of the board of the National Youth Theatre and had seen that the practical experience participants were receiving was greatly enhancing their opportunity for entering the profession. In the days before the opera companies had young artists’ programmes, British Youth Opera was conceived as a 'bridge' organisation, to offer young singers performance opportunities in a fully professional but nurturing environment, in which they could train on the job and perform before a paying audience of the public, and before industry professionals whose influence could help them in their ongoing careers. Alumni have gone on to advanced training courses at the Royal Opera House and the National Opera Studio, and to professional careers. Alumni include Peter Auty, Lucy Crowe, Rosemary Joshua, Katarina Karnéus, Sally Matthews, Christopher Maltman, Claire Rutter, Nicky Spence, Matthew Stiff, and Mark Stone.

The company gave the first London performances of Flight by Jonathan Dove in 2008 and the European premiere of The Enchanted Island by Jeremy Sams in 2018.

== Funding and partnerships ==
British Youth Opera is a registered charity and since 2002 has been core funded by Arts Council England. Charles III is its patron. In 2021 it was announced that Dame Sarah Connolly had replaced Dame Felicity Lott as President, and vice-presidents include Sir Bryn Terfel.

British Youth Opera works in collaboration with Sinfonia Smith Square.
