= Nairne Stewart Sandeman =

British politician (1876–1940)

Sir Nairne Stewart Sandeman MP
- Constituency: Middleton and Prestwich

Personal details
- Born: 12 October 1876 Perthshire
- Died: 23 April 1940 (aged 63) London
- Party: Conservative
- Education: Glenalmond College
- Occupation: businessman

Sir Alexander Nairne Stewart Sandeman, 1st Baronet (12 October 1876 – 23 April 1940) was a Conservative Party politician in the United Kingdom. He was elected at the 1923 general election as Member of Parliament (MP) for Middleton and Prestwich, and held the seat until his death in 1940, aged 63.

== Early life and career ==
He was born in Perthshire in 1876, the son of Col. Frank Stewart Sandeman of Stanley, Perthshire, and Laura Condie; he was educated Trinity College, Glenalmond and married Evelyn F. J. Bell. His eldest sister, Laura, became a doctor and also stood as a Conservative Party candidate. Lawyer Condie Sandeman was his elder brother.

After completing his education Sandeman worked for four years at the North British Mercantile Insurance Company in Edinburgh. From there he went on to work for Frank Steward Sandeman and Sons Ltd, a company specialising in the spinning of jute and cotton. It was an association he had for the remainder of his business career.

He is recorded in 1928 as a director of British Talking Pictures Limited as well as Dawnay Day and Co. Ltd.

In the 1929 King's Birthday Honours, he was made a baronet, of Kenlygreen, St Andrews, Fife.

== Political career ==
Sandeman surprised many when he took the seat of Middleton and Prestwich at the 1923 General Election. He defeated the incumbent, Sir W. R. D. Adkins K.C., who had held the seat since 1918. Sandeman described his approach to the election as one of being a "red hot Protectionist".

He was opposed to the Government of India Act and as a member of the India Defence League is recorded as having supported an amendment calling for the rejection of the act. During the Spanish Civil War, Sandeman was a strong supporter of General Franco and the fascists, serving on the Friends of National Spain committee.

=== Road Accident ===
In March 1935 he was knocked down by a car in Old Palace Yard at the Palace of Westminster. Sandeman was badly injured in the accident, receiving a frontal fracture of the skull (which caused brain damage), a severe concussion, a broken elbow and damage to his ankle. In a subsequent legal action Sandeman was awarded £2,350 in compensation.

The compensation was awarded in an action against the owners of the car, J. Collett Limited. The company admitted liability but the court proceedings recorded the events of the evening. As Sandeman was leaving Parliament at 19.10 on 25 March he was knocked down. Giving evidence Sandeman said that on leaving Parliament he stepped into the road and waited for vehicles to pass. As the defendant's vehicle approach he states he said, "My goodness, that man is not leaving me very much room". Initially, Sandeman thought he had been only lightly injured and attended an engagement that evening. However, the more serious wounds became apparent later.

Sandeman spent two weeks in a dark room and was unable to get up from bed for three and a half. He offered to resign his seat after sustaining these injuries but his constituents declined the offer.

== Personal life ==
In 1902 he married Evelyn Frances Jarvis, who was the daughter of Thomas Bell and Sandeman added the name Stewart to the family by royal license 1929.

Sandeman had a brother, Frederick D. Stewart Sandeman, whom he served as best man at Frederick's wedding to Alexandra Hamilton Fraser in 1932. Nairne went on to give away his niece, Anne Helen Stewart Sandeman at her wedding following the death of her father. He acted in the same capacity for his other niece, Bethea Stewart Sandeman, at her wedding in 1936.

He played golf and participated in the Calcutta Cup tournament played over the New Course at St. Andrews in 1935. His golf handicap was noted at the time of his accident in 1935 as being eight.

Sandeman fell ill at the House of Commons and died on route to Westminster Hospital. He left a widow but no children and his baronetcy ended with him.

== Notes ==
Parliament of the United Kingdom
Preceded by Sir William Ryland Dent Adkins	Member of Parliament for Middleton and Prestwich; 1923–1940	Succeeded by Ernest Everard Gates
Baronetage of the United Kingdom
New creation	Baronet (of Kenlygreen); 1929–1940	Extinct
