= Lost in Transit =

- Film poster
- Tombés du ciel
- Directed by: Philippe Lioret
- Written by: Philippe Lioret; Michael Ganz
- Produced by: Frédéric Brillion; Gilles Legrand; Enrique Posner
- Starring: Jean Rochefort; Marisa Paredes; Ticky Holgado; Laura del Sol
- Cinematography: Thierry Arbogast
- Edited by: Laurent Quaglio
- Music by: Jeff Cohen
- Distributed by: AFMD
- Release dates: September 1993 (San Sebastián); 23 February 1994 (France)
- Running time: 91 minutes
- Countries: France; Spain
- Language: French
- Box office: $770.000

Lost in Transit (original title: Tombés du ciel; literally "Fallen from the Sky") is a 1993 French comedy-drama film directed by Philippe Lioret. The film is about a man who loses his passport and spends a couple of days at a Paris airport, where he meets four people in similar circumstances. The film won the Grand Prize at the 6th Yubari International Fantastic Film Festival held in February 1995. The film was inspired by the predicament of Mehran Karimi Nasseri.

== Cast ==
- Jean Rochefort as Arturo Conti
- Marisa Paredes as Suzana, Arturo's wife
- Ticky Holgado as Serge
- Laura del Sol as Angela
- Sotigui Kouyaté as Knak
- Ismaïla Meite as Zola
- Jean-Louis Richard as Monsieur Armanet
- José Artur as Newspaper shop keeper
- Olivier Saladin as Restaurant manager
- François Morel as first C.R.S.
- Philippe Duquesne as C.R.S.
- Claude Derepp as Bébert, policeman
- Jacques Mathou as Policeman
- Christian Sinniger as Policeman
- Yves Osmu as Policeman
- Dimitri Radochevitch as Bus driver
- Pierre LaPlace as Inspector

== Accolades ==
| Award / Film Festival | Category | Recipients and nominees | Result |
|---|---|---|---|
| San Sebastián International Film Festival | Silver Shell for Best Director | Philippe Lioret | Won |
| San Sebastián International Film Festival | OCIC Award | | Won |
| San Sebastián International Film Festival | Golden Shell | | Nominated |
| Yubari International Fantastic Film Festival | Grand Prize | | Won |

== See also ==
- Mehran Karimi Nasseri
- Flight, 1998 opera
- The Terminal, a 2004 film directed by Steven Spielberg, based on a similar story.
- List of people who have lived at airports
