= The Terminal =

2004 film by Steven Spielberg

- Theatrical release poster
- Directed by: Steven Spielberg
- Screenplay by: Sacha Gervasi; Jeff Nathanson
- Story by: Andrew Niccol; Sacha Gervasi
- Produced by: Walter F. Parkes; Laurie MacDonald; Steven Spielberg
- Starring: Tom Hanks; Catherine Zeta-Jones; Stanley Tucci; Chi McBride; Diego Luna
- Cinematography: Janusz Kamiński
- Edited by: Michael Kahn
- Music by: John Williams
- Production companies: Amblin Entertainment; Parkes/MacDonald Productions
- Distributed by: DreamWorks Pictures
- Release date: June 18, 2004
- Running time: 128 minutes
- Country: United States
- Language: English
- Budget: $60 million
- Box office: $219 million

The Terminal is a 2004 American comedy-drama film produced and directed by Steven Spielberg and starring Tom Hanks, Catherine Zeta-Jones and Stanley Tucci. The film is about an Eastern European man who is stuck in New York's John F. Kennedy Airport terminal when he is denied entry to the United States, but is unable to return to his native country because of a military coup.

The film is partially inspired by the true story of Mehran Karimi Nasseri who lived in Terminal 1 of Paris Charles de Gaulle Airport, France, from 1988 to 2006.

After finishing Catch Me If You Can (2002), Spielberg decided to direct The Terminal because he wanted to make a film "that could make us laugh and cry and feel good about the world". As no suitable airport was willing to provide their facilities, an entire working set was built inside a large hangar at the LA/Palmdale Regional Airport, with the customs hall, offices and most of the film's exterior shots filmed at the Montreal–Mirabel International Airport.

The film was released in North America by DreamWorks Pictures on June 18, 2004, to generally positive reviews and was a commercial success, grossing $219 million worldwide.

== Plot ==
Viktor Navorski, a traveler from Krakozhia, arrives at New York City's John F. Kennedy International Airport and learns that a coup d'état has occurred in his country while he was in the air. The United States does not recognize Krakozhia's new government, rendering Viktor's passport invalid and leaving him unable to either enter the United States or return to Krakozhia. U.S. Customs and Border Protection seizes his passport and return ticket pending resolution of the issue, leaving him stranded at the airport with only his luggage and a Planters peanut can in his possession.

Frank Dixon, the Acting Field Commissioner of the airport, instructs Viktor to stay in the transit lounge until the issue is resolved, but he becomes determined to make Viktor someone else's problem. Viktor finds a gate under renovation and makes it his home. Being considered for a promotion, Dixon becomes increasingly obsessed with getting rid of him.

Viktor has repeated encounters with Gupta Rajan, a grumpy elderly janitor, with whom he slowly forms a bond. He also befriends Joe Mulroy, a baggage handler. Enrique Cruz, a food service truck driver, provides Viktor with free meals in exchange for helping him with Dolores Torres, an immigration officer whom Viktor has befriended. With Viktor's help, Enrique eventually marries Dolores.

Viktor shows skill at construction work when he remodels a wall in a terminal undergoing renovation. The airport contractors assume he is an employee and pay him under the table. He also begins a relationship with Amelia, a flight attendant who is also entangled with a married government official.

During a visit from his superiors, Dixon enlists Viktor's help in communicating with a Russian man who is attempting to bring medicine home to his dying father. Dixon is determined to confiscate the medicine because of a paperwork issue, which Viktor helps the man circumvent. This humiliates Dixon, who threatens Viktor that he will never let him enter the United States. Viktor becomes a legend amongst the terminal employees for helping the man and standing up to Dixon.

Dixon detains Amelia and interrogates her about Viktor. Amelia, who realizes that Viktor has not been entirely truthful, confronts him at his makeshift home, where he shows her that the Planters peanut can contains a copy of the "A Great Day in Harlem" photograph. His late father was a jazz enthusiast who had vowed to collect the autographs of all 57 musicians depicted in the photo. He died needing only the autograph of tenor saxophonist Benny Golson, and Viktor has come to New York to obtain it. After hearing the story, Amelia kisses Viktor.

Nine months after having arrived, Viktor learns that the war in Krakozhia has ended. Amelia reveals that her married boyfriend has secured Viktor a one-day emergency visa so he can fulfill his dream, but she has also rekindled the relationship.

When he presents the emergency visa at customs, Viktor is informed by Dolores that Dixon must sign it. However, as Viktor's passport is valid again, Dixon is determined to deport him to Krakozhia. He warns Viktor that if he does not go home, he will prosecute his friends at the airport for their illegal activities, most seriously by deporting Gupta to India to face a charge of assaulting a corrupt police officer. Viktor agrees to return home, but Gupta delays the plane by running in front of it, thus being taken into custody.

Emboldened by his friend's actions, Viktor decides to leave the airport. Dixon orders his officers to intercept him at the exit, but in defiance of Dixon, they let Viktor leave. Dixon reaches the taxi stand moments after Viktor has left, but he returns to handle the incoming travelers rather than engage in pursuit. Viktor arrives at the hotel where Golson is performing and collects the last autograph, then takes a taxi back to the airport to go home.

== Cast ==
- Tom Hanks as Viktor Navorski
- Catherine Zeta-Jones as Flight Attendant Amelia Warren
- Stanley Tucci as U.S. Customs and Border Protection Acting Field Commissioner Frank Dixon
- Barry Shabaka Henley as U.S. Customs and Border Protection Officer Judge Thurman
- Kumar Pallana as Janitor Gupta Rajan
- Diego Luna as Food Service Deliverer Enrique Cruz
- Chi McBride as Baggage Handler Joe Mulroy
- Zoe Saldaña as U.S. Customs and Border Protection Officer Dolores Torres
- Eddie Jones as U.S. Customs and Border Protection Commissioner Richard Salchak
- Corey Reynolds as U.S. Customs and Border Protection Officer Waylin
- Jude Ciccolella as Karl Iverson
- Guillermo Diaz as Bobby Alima
- Rini Bell as Nadia
- Valery Nikolaev as Milodragovich
- Michael Nouri as Max
- Benny Golson as Himself
- Scott Adsit as Cab Driver
- Ian Finlay as the officer
- Mark Ivanir as Goran
- Dan Finnerty as Cliff
- Stephen Mendel as First Class Steward

== Production ==
The gigantic airport set built for the film.

The idea for the film may have originated from the story of Mehran Karimi Nasseri, also known as Sir Alfred, an Iranian refugee who lived in Terminal One of the Charles de Gaulle Airport, Paris from 1988 until 2006. In September 2003, The New York Times noted that Steven Spielberg bought the rights to Nasseri's life story as the basis for the film; and in September 2004 The Guardian noted Nasseri received thousands of dollars from the filmmakers. However, none of the studio's publicity materials mention Nasseri's story as an inspiration for the film, and the storyline bears no resemblance to Nasseri's experiences. The 1993 French film Lost in Transit was already based on the same story. In deciding to make the film, Spielberg stated that after directing Catch Me If You Can, "I wanted to do another movie that could make us laugh and cry and feel good about the world. ... This is a time when we need to smile more and Hollywood movies are supposed to do that for people in difficult times."

Spielberg traveled around the world to find an actual airport that would let him film for the length of the production but could not find one. The Terminal set was built in a massive hangar at the LA/Palmdale Regional Airport. The hangar, part of the U.S. Air Force Plant 42 complex, was used to build the Rockwell International B-1B bomber. The set was built to full earthquake construction codes and was based on Düsseldorf Airport. The shape of both the actual terminal and the set viewed sideways is a cross-section of an aircraft wing. Because of this design, the film was one of the first to use the Spidercam. The camera, most often used for televised sports, allowed Spielberg the ability to create sweeping shots across the set. The design of the set for The Terminal, as noted by Roger Ebert in his reviews and attested by Spielberg himself in a feature by Empire magazine, was greatly inspired by Jacques Tati's classic film PlayTime.

Tom Hanks based his characterization of Viktor Navorski on his father-in-law Allan Wilson, a Bulgarian immigrant who speaks "Russian, Turkish, Polish, Greek, little bit of Italian, little bit of French", in addition to his native Bulgarian. Hanks also had some help from a Bulgarian translator.

=== Krakozhia ===
Krakozhia (Кракожия) is a fictional country, created for the film, that closely resembles a former Soviet Republic or an Eastern Bloc state.

The exact location of Krakozhia is kept intentionally vague in the film. In one scene, a map of Krakozhia is briefly displayed on one of the airport's television screens during a news report on the ongoing conflict. Its borders are those of present-day North Macedonia (known as the Former Yugoslav Republic of Macedonia at the time of the film's production). In another scene, Viktor shows his driver's license, which is a Belarusian license issued to a woman bearing an Uzbek name. Additionally, Krakozhia's coat of arms, seen on Viktor's passport at the beginning of the film, greatly resembles Belarus' national emblem, albeit with the star at the top moved to the center, taking the place of the country's outline, and without the flowers.

John Williams, the film's composer, also wrote a national anthem for Krakozhia.

Hanks' character speaks mostly Bulgarian as his native Krakozhian. In one scene, in which he helps a Russian-speaking passenger with a customs-related issue, he speaks a constructed Slavic language resembling Bulgarian and Russian. When Viktor buys a guide book of New York both in English and in his mother tongue to compare the two versions and improve his English, the book he studies is written in Russian.

The film presents a reasonably accurate picture of the process of naturalistic second-language acquisition, according to linguist Martha Young-Scholten.

== Soundtrack ==
Professional ratings
Review scores
Source	Rating
AllMusic	4/5 stars
Empire	5/5 stars
Filmtracks	5/5 stars
Movie Wave	3.5/5 stars
Soundtrack.net	3/5 stars

Emily Bernstein played clarinet for the score, including several prominent solos, and her name is in the film's end credits. At the time, individual musicians in studio orchestras typically performed anonymously, but Spielberg insisted on highlighting Bernstein's work; she was being treated for cancer at the time of recording, and she died less than a year later.

The Terminal (Original Motion Picture Soundtrack) track listing

No.	Title	Length
1.	"The Tale of Viktor Navorski"	4:12
2.	"Dinner with Amelia"	8:02
3.	"A Legend is Born"	3:16
4.	"Viktor and his Friends"	4:43
5.	"The Fountain Scene"	5:33
6.	"The Wedding of Officer Torres"	5:01
7.	"Jazz Autographs"	3:45
8.	"Refusing to Escape"	3:01
9.	"Krakozhia National Anthem and Homesickness"	1:49
10.	"Looking for Work"	3:17
11.	"Gupta's Deliverance"	3:18
12.	"Finding Coins and Learning to Read"	4:02
13.	"'Destiny'...'Canneloni'... and The Tale of Viktor Navorski (Reprise)"	5:05
14.	"A Happy Navorski Ending!"	2:47
Total length:		57:58

== Reception ==
=== Box office ===
The Terminal grossed $77.9 million in North America, and $141.2 million in other territories, totaling $219 million worldwide.

The film grossed $19.1 million in its opening weekend, finishing in second, then made $13.1 million in its second weekend, dropping to third.

=== Critical response ===
On Rotten Tomatoes it has an approval rating of 61% based on reviews from 206 critics, with an average rating of 6.2/10. The website's critical consensus reads, "The Terminal transcends its flaws through the sheer virtue of its crowd-pleasing message and a typically solid star turn from Tom Hanks." On Metacritic, the film has a weighted average score of 55 out of 100, based on 41 critics, indicating "mixed or average" reviews. Audiences polled by CinemaScore gave the film an average grade of "B+" on an A+ to F scale.

Michael Wilmington from the Chicago Tribune said "[the film] takes Spielberg into realms he's rarely traveled before." A. O. Scott of The New York Times said Hanks' performance brought a lot to the film.

Roger Ebert of the Chicago Sun-Times gave The Terminal three and a half out of four stars, stating that "This premise could have yielded a film of contrivance and labored invention. Spielberg, his actors and writers... weave it into a human comedy that is gentle and true, that creates sympathy for all of its characters, that finds a tone that will carry them through, that made me unreasonably happy". Martin Liebman of Blu-ray.com considers the film as "quintessential cinema", praising it for being "a down-to-earth, honest, hopeful, funny, moving, lightly romantic, and dramatically relevant film that embodies the term 'movie magic' in every scene." Critic Matt Zoller Seitz of RogerEbert.com considered The Terminal alongside War of the Worlds and Munich (also directed by Spielberg) as the three best films made within the studio system that comment upon the September 11 attacks.

== Home media ==
The Terminal was released on DVD by DreamWorks Home Entertainment on November 23, 2004. In February 2006, Viacom (now known as Paramount Skydance) acquired the rights to The Terminal and all other live-action films DreamWorks had released since 1997, following its billion-dollar-acquisition of the company's live-action film and television library. On May 6, 2014, Paramount Home Entertainment released the film on Blu-ray.

== See also ==
- List of American films of 2004
- List of people who have lived in airports
- Lost in Transit, 1993 French film also inspired by Nasseri.
- Flight, 1998 opera.
- Terminal 1, a 2004 album by Benny Golson.
- A Great Day in Harlem, a 1994 documentary about the photograph and jazz musicians featured in the film.
- Statelessness
