= Mehran Karimi Nasseri =

Iranian refugee (1945–2022)

- مهران کریمی ناصری
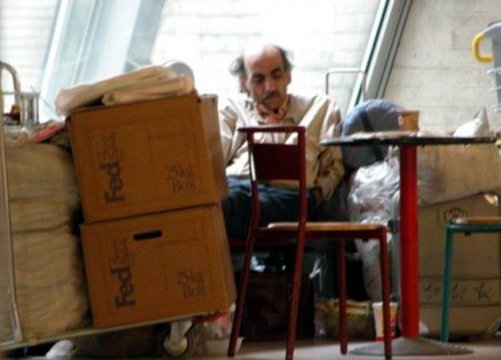
- Nasseri in 2005
- Born: 1945; Masjed Soleyman, Imperial State of Iran
- Died: 12 November 2022 (aged 77); Charles de Gaulle Airport, Le Mesnil-Amelot, France
- Other names: Sir, Alfred Mehran
- Citizenship: Iran (until 1977); Stateless (from 1977)
- Known for: Residing in Charles de Gaulle Airport for 18 years

Mehran Karimi Nasseri (Persian: مهران کریمی ناصری, pronounced [mehˈrɒn kæriˈmi nɒseˈri]; 1945 – 12 November 2022), also known as Sir, Alfred Mehran, was an Iranian refugee who lived in the departure lounge of Terminal 1 at Charles de Gaulle Airport from 26 August 1988 until July 2006. Initially stranded due to lack of valid travel documents, he chose to remain at the airport despite being granted residency in Belgium in 1995 and France in 1999.

Nasseri was hospitalized in 2006 due to declining health and lived in various shelters in Paris for the following sixteen years. He returned to live at the Charles de Gaulle Airport in September 2022 and died there of a heart attack two months later. Nasseri's autobiography was published as a book, The Terminal Man in 2004. His life story inspired the 1993 film Lost in Transit and the 2004 film The Terminal.

== Early life ==
Nasseri was born in the Anglo-Persian Oil Company settlement located in Masjed Soleyman, Iran. His father, Abdelkarim, was an Iranian doctor working for the company which allowed Nasseri to grow up relatively affluently. Nasseri has claimed that he was the result of an illegitimate affair, and that his mother was a nurse from Scotland working in the same place but had also claimed a Swedish mother. However, these claims were never substantiated, and it is most likely that Nasseri's mother was an Iranian homemaker. Aged 28, he arrived in the United Kingdom in September 1973, to take a three-year course in Yugoslav studies at the University of Bradford.

== Life in Terminal 1 ==
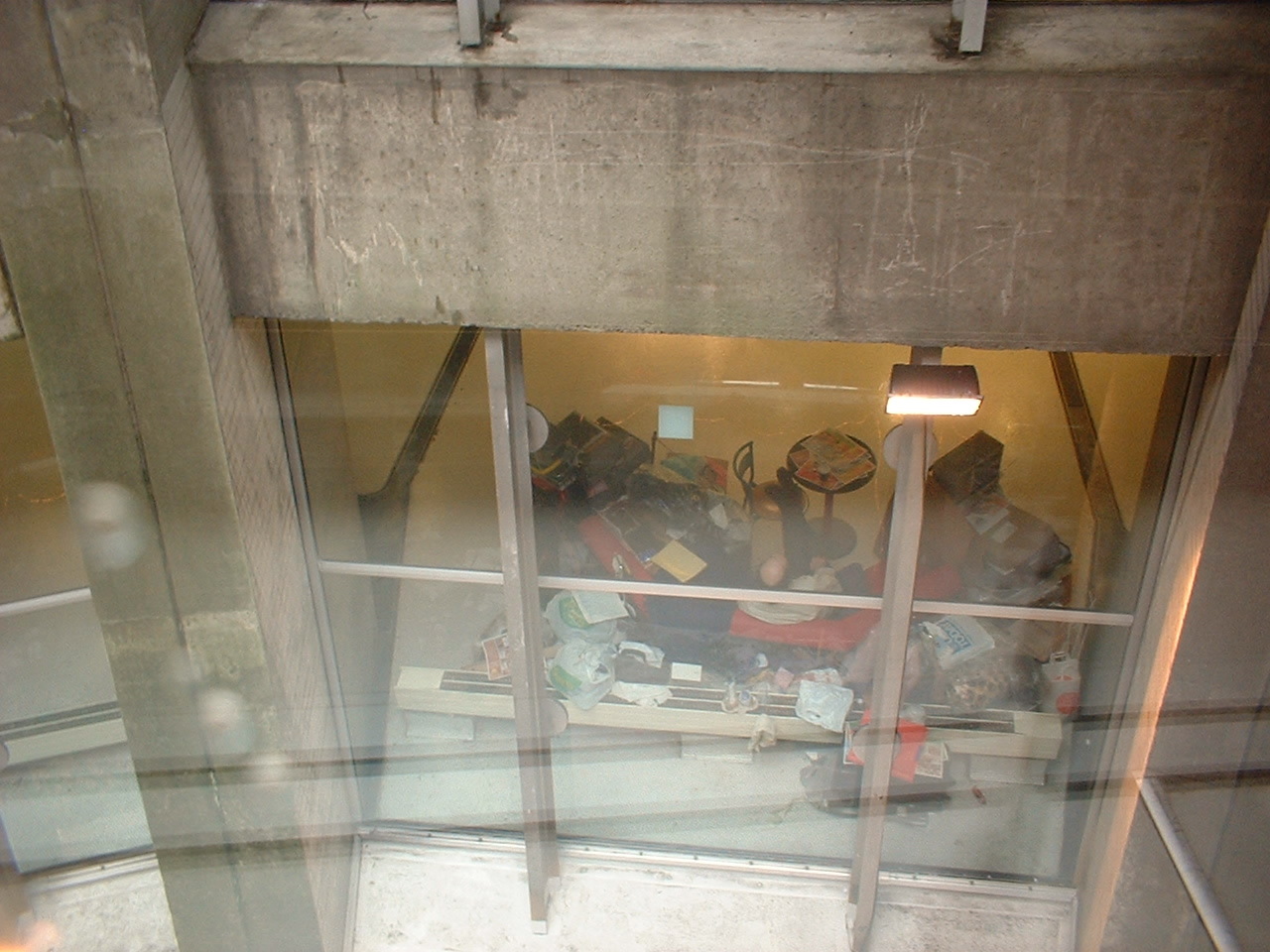
Nasseri's residency site in Terminal 1 of Charles de Gaulle Airport (2004)

Nasseri alleged that he was expelled from Iran in 1977 for protests against the Shah and after a long battle, involving applications in several countries, was awarded refugee status by the United Nations High Commissioner for Refugees in Belgium. This allegedly permitted residence in many other European countries. However, this claim was disputed, with investigations showing that Nasseri was never expelled from Iran.

He was able to travel between the United Kingdom and France, but in 1988, his papers were lost when his briefcase was allegedly stolen. Others indicate that Nasseri actually mailed his documents to Brussels while on board a ferry to Britain, lying about them being stolen. Arriving in London, he was returned to France when he failed to present a passport to British immigration officials. At the French airport, he was unable to prove his identity or refugee status and was detained in the waiting area for travellers without papers.

Nasseri's case was later taken on by French human rights lawyer Christian Bourget. Attempts were then made to have new documents issued from Belgium, but the authorities there would do so only if Nasseri presented himself in person. In 1995, the Belgian authorities granted permission for him to travel to Belgium, but only if he agreed to live there under the supervision of a social worker. Nasseri refused this on the grounds of wanting to enter the UK as originally intended. Both France and Belgium offered Nasseri residency, but he refused to sign the papers as they listed him as being Iranian (rather than British) and did not show his preferred name, "Sir, Alfred Mehran" (including the misplaced comma). His refusal to sign the documents was much to the frustration of his lawyer, Bourget. When contacted about Nasseri's situation, his family stated that they believed he was living the life he wanted.

During his long stay at Terminal 1 in the Charles de Gaulle Airport, he could be found, day or night, around the Paris Bye Bye bar, where he wrote in his journal, listened to the radio, and smoked his gold pipe, or ate a meal at McDonald's. The meals were bought for him by strangers, and he sometimes sat on a red bench in the Terminal's first level in a reflective trance. In other accounts, his luggage was always by his side, as he wrote in his diary or studied economics.

In 2003, Steven Spielberg's DreamWorks production company paid a rumoured US$275,000 to Nasseri for the rights to his story, but ultimately did not use his story in the film The Terminal.

Nasseri's 18-year stay at the airport ended in July 2006 when he was hospitalized and his sitting place was dismantled. Towards the end of January 2007, he left the hospital and was looked after by the airport's branch of the French Red Cross; he was lodged for a few weeks in a hotel close to the airport. On 6 March 2007, he was transferred to an Emmaus charity reception centre in Paris's 20th arrondissement. From 2008 onwards, he lived in a Paris shelter, though in the wake of Nasseri's death in 2022, the Associated Press reported that he had recently returned to live at the airport.

== Autobiography ==
In 2004, Nasseri's autobiography, The Terminal Man, was published. It was co-written by Nasseri with British author Andrew Donkin and was reviewed in The Sunday Times as being "profoundly disturbing and brilliant".

== Documentaries and fictionalizations ==
Nasseri's story provided the inspiration for the 1993 French film Lost in Transit, starring Jean Rochefort. The short story "The Fifteen-Year Layover", written by Michael Paterniti and published in GQ and The Best American Non-Required Reading, chronicles Nasseri's life. Alexis Kouros made a documentary about him, Waiting for Godot at De Gaulle (2000).

=== Flight ===
Nasseri's story was the inspiration for the contemporary opera Flight by British composer Jonathan Dove, which was premiered at the Glyndebourne Opera House in 1998. Flight would go on to win the Helpmann Awards at the Adelaide Festival Theatre in March 2006.

=== Here to Where ===
Glen Luchford and Paul Berczeller made the Here to Where mockumentary (2001), also featuring Nasseri.

=== Sir Alfred of Charles De Gaulle Airport ===
Hamid Rahmanian and Melissa Hibbard made a documentary called Sir Alfred of Charles De Gaulle Airport (2001).

=== The Terminal ===
Nasseri was reportedly the inspiration behind the character Viktor Navorski, played by Tom Hanks, from Steven Spielberg's 2004 film The Terminal. However, neither the film's publicity materials, nor the DVD "special features" nor the film's website mentions Nasseri's situation as an inspiration for the film. Despite this, in September 2003, The New York Times noted that Spielberg had bought the rights to Nasseri's life story as the basis for The Terminal. The Guardian indicated that Spielberg's DreamWorks production company paid US$250,000 to Nasseri for rights to his story and reported that, as of 2004, he carried a poster advertising Spielberg's film draping his suitcase next to his bench. Nasseri was reportedly excited about The Terminal, but it was unlikely that he would ever have had a chance to see it in cinemas.

== Death ==
On 12 November 2022, Nasseri died of a heart attack at Terminal 2F of Charles de Gaulle Airport. Local police and a medical team attempted resuscitation but were unsuccessful, and Nasseri was pronounced dead at the scene.

He was interred on 8 December 2023 in Cimetière communal de Mauregard (the communal cemetery of Mauregard) in France.

== See also ==
- List of people who have lived in airports
- Statelessness
