= Ryedale (constituency) =

UK Parliament constituency (1983–2010)

Coordinates: 54.139°N 0.79°W

- Former county constituency for the House of Commons
- Boundary of Ryedale in North Yorkshire for the 2005 general election

- Location of North Yorkshire within England
- County: North Yorkshire
- Major settlements: Malton, Helmsley, Pickering

1983–2010
- Seats: One
- Created from: Thirsk & Malton, Howden, Scarborough and Bridlington
- Replaced by: Thirsk and Malton, York Outer

Ryedale was a constituency in North Yorkshire represented in the House of Commons of the Parliament of the United Kingdom. It elected one Member of Parliament (MP) by the first past the post system of election. It was created in 1983 and abolished in 2010.

== History ==
This was traditionally a safe Conservative seat, although it was briefly taken by Elizabeth Shields for the Liberal Party, following a by-election in 1986 held following the death of MP John Spence.

== Boundaries ==
1983–1997: The District of Ryedale wards of Amotherby, Ampleforth, Birdsall, Clifton Without, Dales, Ebberston, Haxby North East, Haxby West, Helmsley, Hovingham, Huntington North, Huntington South, Kirby Misperton, Kirkbymoorside, Malton, New Earswick, Norton, Pickering, Rawcliffe, Rillington, Sherburn, Sheriff Hutton, Skelton, Stockton and Bossall, Strensall, Thornton Dale, and Wigginton, the District of Hambleton wards of Crayke, Easingwold, Helperby, Huby-Sutton, Shipton, Stillington, and Tollerton, and the Borough of Scarborough wards of Filey and Hertford.

1997–2010: The District of Ryedale wards of Amotherby, Ampleforth, Birdsall, Dales, Ebberston, Helmsley, Hovingham, Huntington North, Huntington South, Kirby Misperton, Kirkbymoorside, Malton, Norton, Osbaldwick and Heworth, Pickering, Rillington, Sherburn, Sheriff Hutton, Stockton and Bosall, Strensall, and Thornton Dale, and the Borough of Scarborough wards of Filey and Hertford.

The constituency was created in 1983 and at the time of its abolition in 2010, covered Ryedale (including Malton, Norton-on-Derwent, Helmsley and Pickering), Filey and the north eastern suburbs of York (including Huntington, Strensall, Osbaldwick and Heworth Without).

=== Boundary review ===
Following the Boundary Commission for England's review of parliamentary representation in North Yorkshire, Ryedale constituency was abolished, with its electoral wards being used to form a new Thirsk and Malton seat. These changes were implemented in 2010.

== Members of Parliament ==
Election	Member	Party	Notes
1983	John Spence	Conservative	Previously MP for Thirsk and Malton from 1974. Died March 1986
1986 by-election	Elizabeth Shields	Liberal	Defeated at 1987 general election
1987	John Greenway	Conservative	Retired 2010, following deselection by constituency party due to boundary changes
2010	constituency abolished: see Thirsk and Malton		

== Elections ==
=== Elections in the 2000s ===
General election 2005: Ryedale
Party	Candidate	Votes	%	±%
Conservative	John Greenway	21,251	48.2	+1.0
Liberal Democrats	Gordon Beever	10,782	24.4	−11.7
Labour	Paul Blanchard	9,148	20.7	+6.0
UKIP	Stephen Feaster	1,522	3.4	+1.4
Liberal	John Clark	1,417	3.2	New
Majority		10,469	23.8	+12.7
Turnout		44,120	65.1	−0.6
Conservative hold		Swing	+6.3	

General election 2001: Ryedale
Party	Candidate	Votes	%	±%
Conservative	John Greenway	20,711	47.2	+3.4
Liberal Democrats	Keith Orrell	15,836	36.1	+2.7
Labour	David B. Ellis	6,470	14.7	−3.3
UKIP	Stephen Feaster	882	2.0	+0.1
Majority		4,875	11.1	+0.7
Turnout		43,899	65.7	−9.1
Conservative hold		Swing		

=== Elections in the 1990s ===
General election 1997: Ryedale
Party	Candidate	Votes	%	±%
Conservative	John Greenway	21,351	43.8	−11.6
Liberal Democrats	Keith Orrell	16,293	33.4	+3.4
Labour	Alison M. Hiles	8,762	18.0	+3.3
Referendum	John E. Mackfall	1,460	3.0	New
UKIP	Stephen Feaster	917	1.9	New
Majority		5,038	10.4	−15.0
Turnout		48,783	74.8	−6.9
Conservative hold		Swing	−7.5	

General election 1992: Ryedale
Party	Candidate	Votes	%	±%
Conservative	John Greenway	39,888	56.1	+2.8
Liberal Democrats	Elizabeth Shields	21,449	30.1	−8.5
Labour	John Healey	9,812	13.8	+5.7
Majority		18,439	26.0	+11.3
Turnout		71,149	81.7	+2.5
Conservative hold		Swing	+5.6	

=== Elections in the 1980s ===
General election 1987: Ryedale
Party	Candidate	Votes	%	±%
Conservative	John Greenway	35,149	53.3	−5.9
Alliance (Liberal)	Elizabeth Shields	25,409	38.6	+8.1
Labour	John Beighton	5,340	8.1	−2.2
Majority		9,740	14.7	−14.0
Turnout		65,988	79.2	+7.4
Conservative hold		Swing		

1986 Ryedale by-election
Party	Candidate	Votes	%	±%
Alliance (Liberal)	Elizabeth Shields	27,612	50.3	+19.8
Conservative	Neil Balfour	22,672	41.3	−17.9
Labour	Shirley Haines	4,633	8.4	−1.9
Majority		4,940	9.0	N/A
Turnout		54,917	67.3	−4.5
Liberal gain from Conservative		Swing	+19.0	

General election 1983: Ryedale
Party	Candidate	Votes	%	±%
Conservative	John Spence	33,312	59.2	
Alliance (Liberal)	Elizabeth Shields	17,170	30.5	
Labour	Philip Bloom	5,816	10.3	
Majority		16,142	28.7	
Turnout		56,298	71.8	
Conservative win (new seat)				

== See also ==
- List of parliamentary constituencies in North Yorkshire
