= Agriculture Select Committee =

UK government select committee, to 2001

The Agriculture Select Committee was a select committee of the House of Commons in the Parliament of the United Kingdom. It was dissolved in 2001 and replaced by the Environment, Food and Rural Affairs Select Committee following the replacement of the Ministry of Agriculture, Food and Fisheries with the Department for Environment, Food and Rural Affairs.

== Remit ==
The select committee scrutinised the Ministry of Agriculture, Fisheries and Food and the agricultural industry.

== Chairs ==
Committee chairs include those listed below.

Name	Start	End	Party	Constituency
William Elliott	3 May 1979	9 June 1983	Conservative	Newcastle upon Tyne North
John Spence	1 January 1984	4 March 1986	Conservative	Ryedale
Richard Body	13 March 1986	1 January 1987	Conservative	Holland with Boston
Jerry Wiggin	1 January 1987	17 October 1996	Conservative	Weston-super-Mare
Peter Luff	14 July 1997	15 February 2000	Conservative	Mid Worcestershire
David Curry	15 February 2000	11 May 2001	Conservative	Skipton and Ripon

== Membership ==
After the 1997 United Kingdom general election the committee had the following members:

Member	Party	Constituency
Peter Luff MP (chair)	Conservative	Mid Worcestershire
David Borrow MP	Labour	South Ribble
David Drew MP	Labour	Stroud
David Curry MP	Conservative	Skipton and Ripon
Alan Hurst MP	Labour	Braintree
Michael Jack MP	Conservative	Fylde
Fiona Jones MP	Labour	Newark
Paul Marsden MP	Labour	Shrewsbury and Atcham
Austin Mitchell MP	Labour	Great Grimsby
Lembit Öpik MP	Lib Dems	Montgomeryshire
Mark Todd MP	Labour	South Derbyshire

== See also ==
- Parliamentary committees of the United Kingdom
