= Frank Hooley =

English politician (1923–2015)

Frank Oswald Hooley (30 November 1923 – 21 January 2015) was an English Labour Party politician.

== Political career ==
Hooley contested Skipton at the 1959 General Election, finishing second. He first stood for the Sheffield Heeley seat in 1964, but was beaten by the Conservative Peter Roberts.

With the campaign slogan "Hooley for Heeley", he won Sheffield Heeley at the 1966 general election, the first Labour Party candidate to win this seat since its creation in 1950. However, at the 1970 general election he lost the seat to the Conservative John Deane Spence by 713 votes. He regained the seat at the February 1974 election and held it until 1983 general election, when he was deselected by the local party. He then stood unsuccessfully in the Conservative stronghold of Stratford-on-Avon.

Meg Munn, who won Sheffield Heeley in 2001, is the daughter of Hooley's campaign manager at the 1966 general election.

Parliament of the United Kingdom
| Preceded by Peter Roberts | Member of Parliament for Sheffield Heeley; 1966–1970 | Succeeded by John Spence |
| Preceded by John Spence | Member of Parliament for Sheffield Heeley; Feb 1974–1983 | Succeeded by Bill Michie |
