= Charles Duncombe, 2nd Earl of Feversham =

British politician

Lieutenant-Colonel The Right Honourable The Earl of Feversham
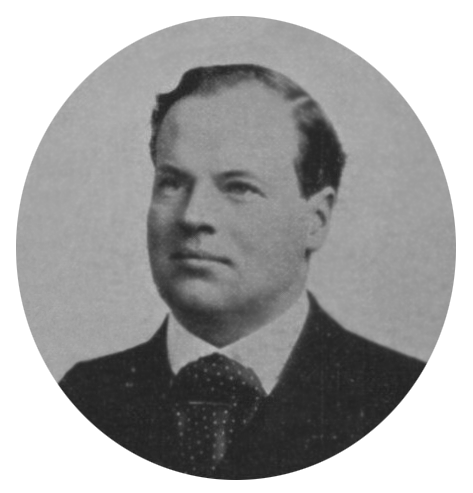
- Duncombe from the Roll of Honour published in The Illustrated London News on 30 September 1916

Member of Parliament for Thirsk and Malton
- In office 1906–1915
- Preceded by: Sir John Lawson
- Succeeded by: Edmund Russborough Turton

Personal details
- Born: Charles William Reginald Duncombe; 8 May 1879
- Died: 15 September 1916 (aged 37) Somme, France
- Resting place: AIF Burial Ground, Flers, Somme, France
- Party: Conservative
- Spouse: Lady Marjorie Blanche Eva Greville (m. 1904)
- Children: 3
- Parents: William Duncombe, Viscount Helmsley (father); Lady Muriel Chetwynd-Talbot (mother)
- Relatives: Charles Duncombe, 3rd Earl of Feversham (son); Francis Greville, 5th Earl of Warwick (father-in-law)
- Education: Eton College
- Alma mater: Christ Church, Oxford
- Military career
- Allegiance: United Kingdom
- Branch: British Army
- Service years: 1902–1917
- Rank: Lieutenant Colonel
- Units: Yorkshire Hussars; King's Royal Rifle Corps
- Conflicts: World War I; Battle of Flers-Courcelette

Arms of Duncombe: Per chevron engrailed gules and argent, three talbot's heads erased counterchanged

Lieutenant-Colonel Charles William Reginald Duncombe, 2nd Earl of Feversham (8 May 1879 – 15 September 1916), known as Viscount Helmsley from 1881 to 1915, was a British Conservative Party politician and soldier.

== Origins ==
Charles Duncombe was born on 8 May 1879, the son of William Duncombe, Viscount Helmsley, elder son of William Duncombe, 1st Earl of Feversham, and Lady Muriel Frances Louisa, daughter of Charles Chetwynd-Talbot, 19th Earl of Shrewsbury. His father William, Viscount Helmsley, died in 1881, and so the viscountcy thus passed to Charles Duncombe.

Duncombe was educated at Eton College and Christ Church, Oxford, gaining a blue in polo with OUPC. He was also a member of Apollo University Lodge.

== Career ==
Duncombe was appointed an assistant private secretary (unpaid) to Lord Selborne, First Lord of the Admiralty, in June 1902. He was elected as the Member of Parliament (MP) for Thirsk and Malton in 1906 and held the seat until he inherited his title on the death of his grandfather in 1915, becoming a member of the House of Lords.

He was an outspoken opponent of women's suffrage; a 1908 profile noted that he "is a very ardent adherent of any cause he espouses; indeed his keenness is one of the remarkable traits of his character ... fearless and outspoken in the expression of his views on all subjects".

=== Military career ===
Duncombe joined the Yorkshire Hussars, and was promoted to Lieutenant on 21 May 1902, rising to become Lieutenant Colonel before transferring as a battalion commander of the King's Royal Rifle Corps.

He enlisted for active service in the First World War, and was killed in action on 15 September 1916 at the Battle of Flers-Courcelette, while commanding 21st Bn (Yeoman Rifles) King's Royal Rifle Corps. The battalion was formed in 1915 at Helmsley.

Richard Holmes claimed that Duncombe took his deerhound to war, and that it was killed and buried with him, although this was refuted in 2014 by a young relative, who said that the dog survived, and was looked after by then Prime Minister, David Lloyd George, who was a great friend of Duncombe.

Charles Duncombe, Lord Feversham, lies in the AIF Burial Ground near the village of Flers on the Somme.

== Personal life ==
Duncombe married Lady Marjorie Blanche Eva Greville, daughter of Francis Greville, 5th Earl of Warwick, in 1904. They had two sons and one daughter:

- Lady Mary Diana Duncombe (1905–1943), who married Lt. William Greville Worthington of Kingston Russell.
- Charles Duncombe, 3rd Earl of Feversham (1906–1963), who also became a Conservative politician; he married Lady Anne Dorothy Wood, only daughter of Edward Wood, 1st Earl of Halifax and Lady Dorothy Onslow (a daughter of William Onslow, 4th Earl of Onslow), in 1936.
- Hon. David Duncombe (1910–1927), who was killed in a car accident in 1927, aged 17.

Duncombe lived at Duncombe Park and, when in London, at 87 Eaton Square. He became master of the Sinnington Hunt in 1904. He was a member of the Carlton Club, Turf Club, the Bachelors' Club and White's.

Following his death, the Dowager Lady Feversham married the Conservative politician Gervase Beckett in 1917. She died in July 1964, aged 79.

=== Descendants ===
Through his daughter Diana, he was a grandfather of Capt. Charles William David Worthington (b. 1930) who married, as her second husband, Sara Stucley (youngest daughter of Sir Dennis Stucley, 5th Baronet).

Through his son Charles, he was a grandfather of Lady Clarissa Duncombe (1938-2021), who married, as his second wife, Maj. Nicholas Spencer Compton Collin, of Wytherstone House, Pockley.

Parliament of the United Kingdom
Preceded by Sir John Lawson	Member of Parliament for Thirsk and Malton; 1906–1915	Succeeded by Edmund Russborough Turton
Peerage of the United Kingdom
Preceded by William Ernest Duncombe	Earl of Feversham; 1915–1916	Succeeded by Charles Duncombe
