= Paul Hackett =

Paul Hackett may refer to:

- Paul Hackett (veteran advocate) (born 1963), American military lawyer and a one-time Congressional candidate who advocates for military veterans
- Paul Hackett (American football) (born 1947), American football coach
- Paul Hackett, director of the Smith Institute
