= Robin Turton, Baron Tranmire =

British politician (1903–1994)

The Right Honourable The Lord Tranmire KBE MC PC JP DL
- Turton in 1949

Father of the House of Commons
- In office 19 February 1965 – 8 February 1974
- Preceded by: Rab Butler
- Succeeded by: George Strauss

Member of Parliament for Thirsk and Malton
- In office 30 May 1929 – 8 February 1974
- Preceded by: Edmund Turton
- Succeeded by: John Spence

Personal details
- Born: Robert Hugh Turton; 8 August 1903 Kildale, North Riding of Yorkshire, England
- Died: 17 January 1994 (aged 90)
- Party: Conservative
- Education: Eton College, Balliol College, Oxford
- Occupation: Lawyer

Robert Hugh Turton, Baron Tranmire, KBE, MC, PC, JP, DL (8 August 1903 – 17 January 1994) was a British Conservative Party politician.

== Biography ==
The son of Major R B Turton of Kildale Hall, Kildale, North Riding of Yorkshire, Turton was educated at Eton College and at Balliol College, Oxford. He was called to the Bar by the Inner Temple in 1926.

Turton joined the 4th Battalion of the Green Howards at the outbreak of World War II and served as Deputy Assistant Adjutant-General of the 50th (Northumbrian) Division. He was awarded the Military Cross in 1942.

== Parliamentary career ==
At the 1929 general election, Turton was elected Member of Parliament (MP) for Thirsk and Malton, a seat which he held continuously until his retirement from the House of Commons at the February 1974 general election. Turton was Father of the House from 1965 to 1974. He attributed his election as an MP at the unusually young age of 25 to the death of his predecessor and kinsman Sir Edmund Turton, 1st Baronet three weeks before polling day and the local Conservative association not wanting to waste its "Vote For Turton" posters.

Turton held ministerial office as Parliamentary Secretary to the Minister of National Insurance from 1951 to 1953, Parliamentary Secretary to the Minister of Pensions and National Insurance from 1953 to 1954, and as Joint Parliamentary Under-Secretary of State for Foreign Affairs from October 1954 to December 1955. From December 1955 to January 1957 Turton served in Sir Anthony Eden's Ministry as Minister of Health, a post then outside of the Cabinet but of Cabinet rank, and was appointed a Privy Counsellor in 1955.

In Parliament, Turton was Chairman of the Select Committee on Procedure from 1970 to 1974. He was opposed to British membership of the EEC.

== Honours ==
Turton was appointed a Knight Commander of the Order of the British Empire (KBE) in the 1971 Birthday Honours and on 9 May 1974, he was created a Life Peer as Baron Tranmire, of Upsall in the North Riding of Yorkshire.

He was appointed as Justice of the Peace in 1936 and a Deputy Lieutenant for the North Riding of Yorkshire in 1962.

== Family ==
Turton was cousin twice removed of Peter Bottomley, who became Father of the House after the 2019 general election.

== Arms ==
Coat of arms of Robin Turton, Baron Tranmire
Notes Arms granted to The Rt Hon, The Baron Tranmire of Upsall in the North Riding of Yorkshire, KBE, MC, PC, JP, DL circa 1974 Adopted 13 May 1796 Crest Out of a Park Pales Gules a Dexter Cubit Arm vested Vert cuffed Argent the hand grasping a Flag-Staff proper therefrom flowing a Flag per pale Argent and Azure fringed Or charged with a Trefoil slipped fesswise counterchanged Torse Argent and azure Escutcheon Ermine nine Trefoils slipped four three and two alternately Vert and Azure in base a Cross Crosslet fitchée Sable a Canton Gules; Motto Formosa Quae Honesta Orders Knight Commander of the Order of the British Empire, Military Cross

Parliament of the United Kingdom
Preceded by Sir Edmund Turton, Bt.	Member of Parliament for Thirsk & Malton; 1929 – Feb. 1974	Succeeded by John Spence
Preceded by Rab Butler	Father of the House; 1965 – 1974	Succeeded by George Strauss
Political offices
Preceded by Iain Macleod	Minister of Health; 1955 – 1957	Succeeded by Dennis Vosper
