= Sir Peter Roberts, 3rd Baronet =

British conservative politician (1912–1985)

3rd Baronet Roberts

Sir Peter Geoffrey Roberts, 3rd Baronet (23 June 1912 – 22 July 1985) was a British Conservative Party politician.

Roberts was educated at Harrow School and Trinity College, Cambridge, and upon coming down from university became a barrister-at-law at the Inner Temple. He was elected at the 1945 general election as member of parliament (MP) for Sheffield Ecclesall. When that constituency was abolished for the 1950 general election, he was elected for the newly created Sheffield Heeley constituency. He retired from Parliament at the 1966 election, when the seat was taken by Labour candidate Frank Hooley.

Sir Peter married Judith Hempson in 1939: they had a son and four daughters. Sir Peter was succeeded as Baronet by his son Samuel, married to Georgina Cory since 1977. Lady Roberts and Sir Samuel run the Cockley Cley Estate near Swaffham. Lady Roberts became the first woman Chairman of the Norfolk Country Landowners Association.

He was Sheriff of Hallamshire in 1970. Lady Roberts died in 1998.

Parliament of the United Kingdom
Preceded by Sir Robert Ellis	Member of Parliament for Sheffield Ecclesall; 1945–1950	Constituency abolished
New constituency	Member of Parliament for Sheffield Heeley; 1950–1966	Succeeded by Frank Hooley
Baronetage of the United Kingdom
Preceded by Samuel Roberts	Baronet (of Ecclesall and Queen's Tower); 1955–1985	Succeeded by Samuel Roberts
