= Louise Haigh =

British politician (born 1987)

The Right Honourable Louise Haigh MP
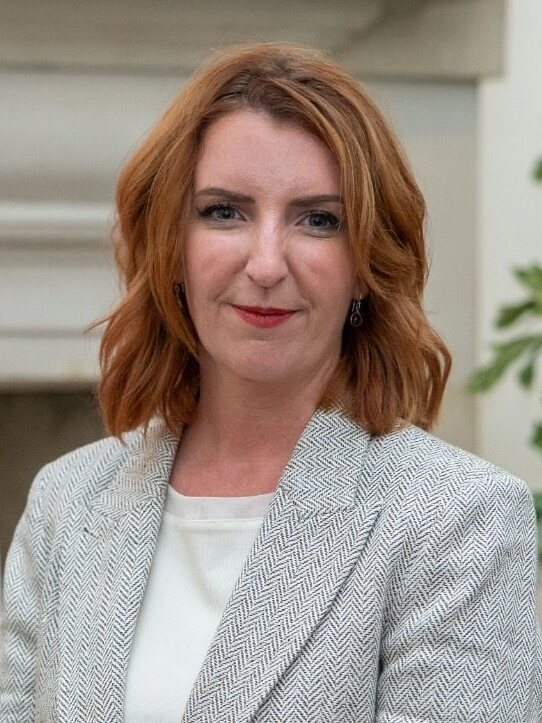
- Official portrait, 2026

First Secretary of State
- Incumbent
- Assumed office 20 July 2026
- Prime Minister: Andy Burnham
- Preceded by: Dominic Raab (Note: Office vacant between 16 September 2021 and 19 July 2026. David Lammy preceded her as Deputy Prime Minister of the United Kingdom.)

Chancellor of the Duchy of Lancaster
- Incumbent
- Assumed office 20 July 2026
- Prime Minister: Andy Burnham
- Preceded by: Darren Jones

Minister for the Cabinet Office
- Incumbent
- Assumed office 20 July 2026
- Prime Minister: Andy Burnham
- Preceded by: Nick Thomas-Symonds

Secretary of State for Transport
- In office 5 July 2024 – 28 November 2024
- Prime Minister: Keir Starmer
- Preceded by: Mark Harper
- Succeeded by: Heidi Alexander
Shadow portfolios
Shadow Secretary of State
2021–2024	Transport
2020–2021	Northern Ireland
Shadow Minister
2017–2020	Policing
2016–2017	Digital Economy
2015–2016	Civil Service and Digital Reform

Member of Parliament for Sheffield Heeley
- Incumbent
- Assumed office 7 May 2015
- Preceded by: Meg Munn
- Majority: 15,304 (39.8%)

Personal details
- Born: Louise Margaret Haigh; 22 July 1987 (age 39) Sheffield, South Yorkshire, England
- Party: Labour
- Domestic partner: Colum Eastwood (since 2025)
- Education: University of Nottingham (BA); Birkbeck, University of London (LLM)
- Website: louisehaigh.org.uk

Louise Margaret Haigh (Note: Pronounced /heɪɡ/ HAYG) (born 22 July 1987) is a British politician who has served as First Secretary of State, Chancellor of the Duchy of Lancaster, and Minister for the Cabinet Office since July 2026. She previously served as Secretary of State for Transport from July to November 2024. A member of the Labour Party, she has been the Member of Parliament (MP) for Sheffield Heeley since 2015. She held various shadow ministerial and shadow cabinet positions between 2015 and 2024.

Born in Sheffield, Haigh was privately educated at Sheffield High School and later studied at the University of Nottingham. She later worked in Parliament, before working as a public policy manager at Aviva. Haigh was elected to Parliament as MP for Sheffield Heeley in the 2015 general election, and joined the shadow frontbench as Shadow Minister for the Civil Service and Digital Reform under Jeremy Corbyn. She became the Shadow Minister for the Digital Economy in 2016, and was re-elected in the 2017 general election. She was the Shadow Minister for Policing from 2017 to 2020, and was re-elected in the 2019 general election.

After Keir Starmer became Leader of the Opposition in 2020, Haigh joined the Shadow Cabinet as Shadow Secretary of State for Northern Ireland. In November 2021, she became the Shadow Secretary of State for Transport. Following Labour's victory in the 2024 general election, Haigh was appointed to the Cabinet as Secretary of State for Transport in the Starmer ministry. On 28 November 2024, it emerged that Haigh had pleaded guilty to fraud by false representation in 2014 after falsely reporting in 2013 to police that her work phone had been stolen; she subsequently resigned as Transport Secretary. An ally of Andy Burnham, she rejoined Cabinet as First Secretary of State, Chancellor of the Duchy of Lancaster and Minister for the Cabinet Office after he became prime minister in 2026.

== Early life and career ==
Louise Haigh was born on 22 July 1987 in Sheffield, South Yorkshire, England. She grew up on Abbeydale Road. Her grandfather and uncle were trade union officials. She was educated at Sheffield High School, an all-girls private school. She then studied government and economics at the London School of Economics, but did not complete the course, opting to study politics at the University of Nottingham. She also studied law at Birkbeck, University of London.

After graduating, Haigh worked for Nottingham City Council's youth service from 2006 to 2008. She then began working in Parliament, where she was the co-ordinator of the all-party parliamentary group on international corporate responsibility. During this time, she was also a Unite shop steward and volunteered as a special constable in the Metropolitan Special Constabulary from 2009 to 2011.

From 2012 until her election in 2015, Haigh worked for insurer Aviva as public policy manager, responsible for corporate governance and responsible investment policy. During this period, in 2014, she pleaded guilty to fraud by false representation after falsely reporting to the police that her work phone from Aviva had been stolen in 2013. She received a conditional discharge and a fine, a conviction that later resurfaced and led to her resignation as Transport Secretary in late 2024.

== Parliamentary career ==
Haigh was selected to stand for the Labour Party in Sheffield Heeley in May 2014. At the 2015 general election, she was elected to Parliament as MP for Sheffield Heeley with 48.2% of the vote and a majority of 12,954.

=== Early career and frontbench (2015–2020) ===
In September 2015, Haigh was appointed Shadow Minister for Civil Service and Digital Reform. The role, newly expanded under Jeremy Corbyn, covered the Government's digital strategy, the Freedom of Information Act, data security and privacy. In this role, Haigh criticised a 2016 reshuffle of Permanent Secretaries which saw two fewer women as departmental heads. She opposed the closure of the Department for Business, Innovation and Skills office in Sheffield city centre, saying the decision demonstrated "contempt" for the city.

Haigh was declared the "most hard-working" new MP in February 2016 after a study of the activity of MPs elected in 2015.

In September 2016, Haigh revealed that hundreds of women had their tax credits stopped in error by US company Concentrix. The revelation led to an announcement that their HMRC contract would not be renewed.

Panic alarms were installed in Haigh's office and home by South Yorkshire Police in December 2016 after she received death threats for calling for a debate on the banning of Britain First, the far-right group. South Yorkshire Police provided her with uniformed and undercover protection as she attended to her constituency activities.

On 10 October 2016, she was made Shadow Minister for the Digital Economy. Haigh served in this role during the passage of the Digital Economy Act (2017) and introduced a number of amendments, including an obligation for television broadcasters to include subtitles and closed captioning in on-demand content online which was adopted by a subsequent Government amendment. She repeatedly raised concerns about child protection online, including calling for social media companies to recognise "that alongside their new-found power, they have responsibilities" in dealing with harmful and illegal content.

At the snap 2017 general election, Haigh was re-elected with an increased vote share of 60% and an increased majority of 13,828.

On 3 July 2017, she was made Shadow Policing Minister. Haigh has called for greater protection for police officers involved in vehicle pursuits, saying the current rules are "hampering the ability of the police to apprehend very serious offenders". In this role, she has raised the issue of stress and mental health of officers, citing a 77% rise in officer leave due to mental health problems between 2014 and 2018. She has called for a "public health approach" to reducing violent crime and blamed the rise in crime on government spending cuts to both police and other public services.

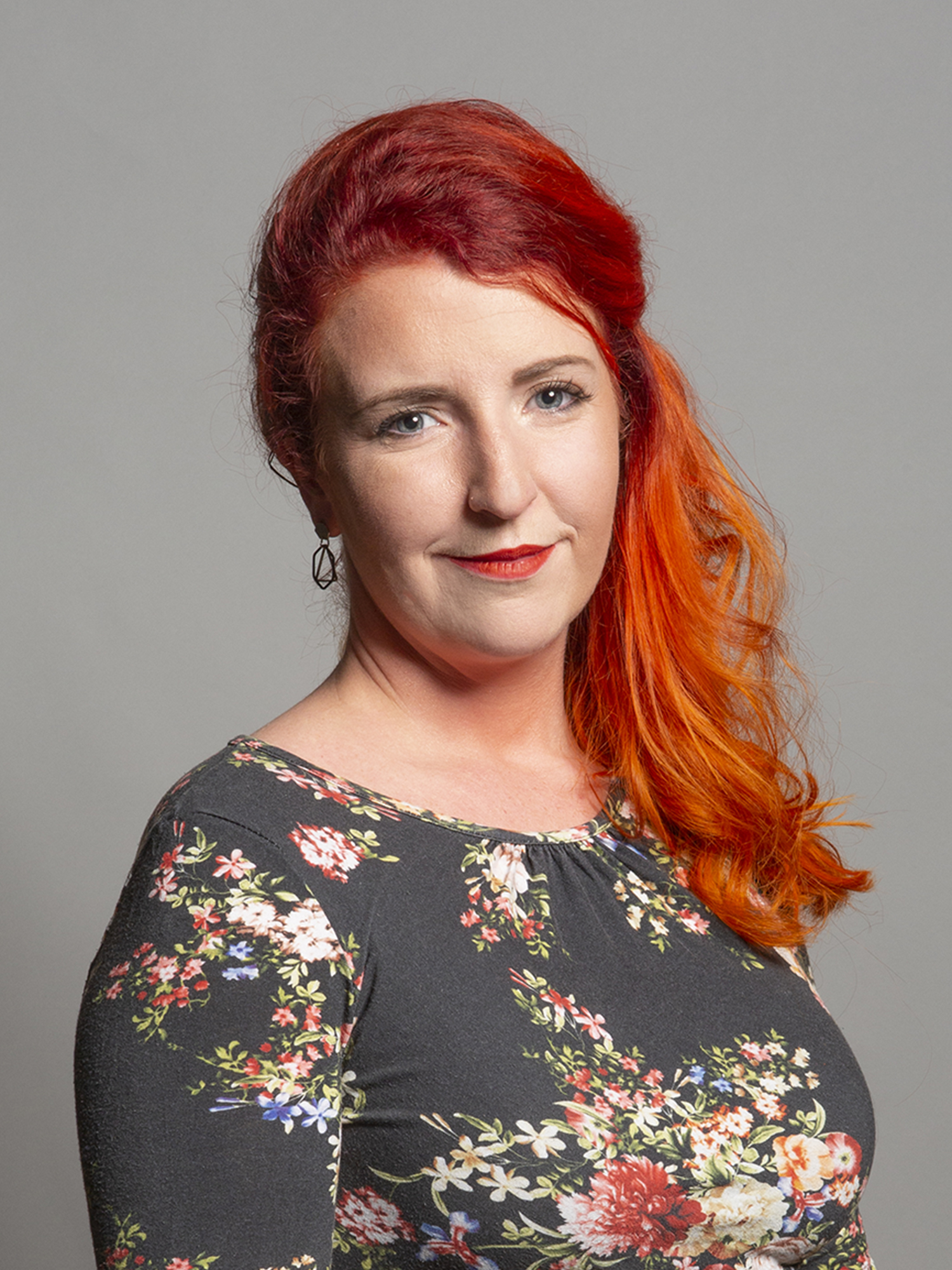
MP portrait, 2019

Haigh was a member of a number of all-party parliamentary groups (APPGs), including the APPGs on corporate governance, refugees, Colombia and looked-after children. In July 2017, she was elected vice chair of the APPG on state pension inequality and in February 2019, became a joint chair of the APPG on social care.

In October 2018, Haigh stated her concern that forcing police to find more to pay for police pensions out of their general budget leaves less money for the police to protect the public. Haigh also said it was wrong that the police were forced to deal with mental health crises due to underfunding of the NHS.

In April 2019, Haigh introduced a private member's bill that would remove the automatic parental rights of fathers of children conceived through rape. The bill would also establish an inquiry into the family court's handling of domestic abuse and violence against women and girls. According to Haigh's website, this Bill was inspired by her work with Sammy Woodhouse, a survivor of child sexual exploitation, to increase protections for victims of abuse.

At the 2019 general election, Haigh was again re-elected, with a decreased vote share of 50.3% and a decreased majority of 8,520.

=== Shadow Northern Ireland Secretary (2020–2021) ===
On 6 April 2020, Haigh replaced Tony Lloyd as the interim Shadow Secretary of State for Northern Ireland in the Starmer shadow cabinet, following Lloyd's hospitalisation as a result of COVID-19. On 28 April 2020, Lloyd resigned as Shadow Northern Ireland Secretary to focus on recovery, and Haigh replaced him permanently. She is the second woman after Mo Mowlam to serve as the Shadow Secretary of State for Northern Ireland.

Haigh made her first visit to Northern Ireland as Shadow Secretary of State in August 2020. Following Brexit she was in charge of Northern Ireland policy in relation to the Northern Ireland Protocol. She said: "We're a unionist party in the Labour Party, but if there is a border poll we should remain neutral. I think that's an important principle." Haigh was criticised for undermining the views of Keir Starmer who said he would side with unionists in any poll.

=== Shadow Transport Secretary (2021–2024) ===
During the shadow cabinet reshuffle, Haigh was appointed as the Shadow Secretary of State for Transport on 29 November 2021. She was replaced as Shadow Northern Ireland Secretary by Peter Kyle.

Haigh revealed Labour's plans for the renationalisation of British rail on 25 April 2024, pledging to do this in the first term of a Labour government.

=== Transport Secretary (2024) ===
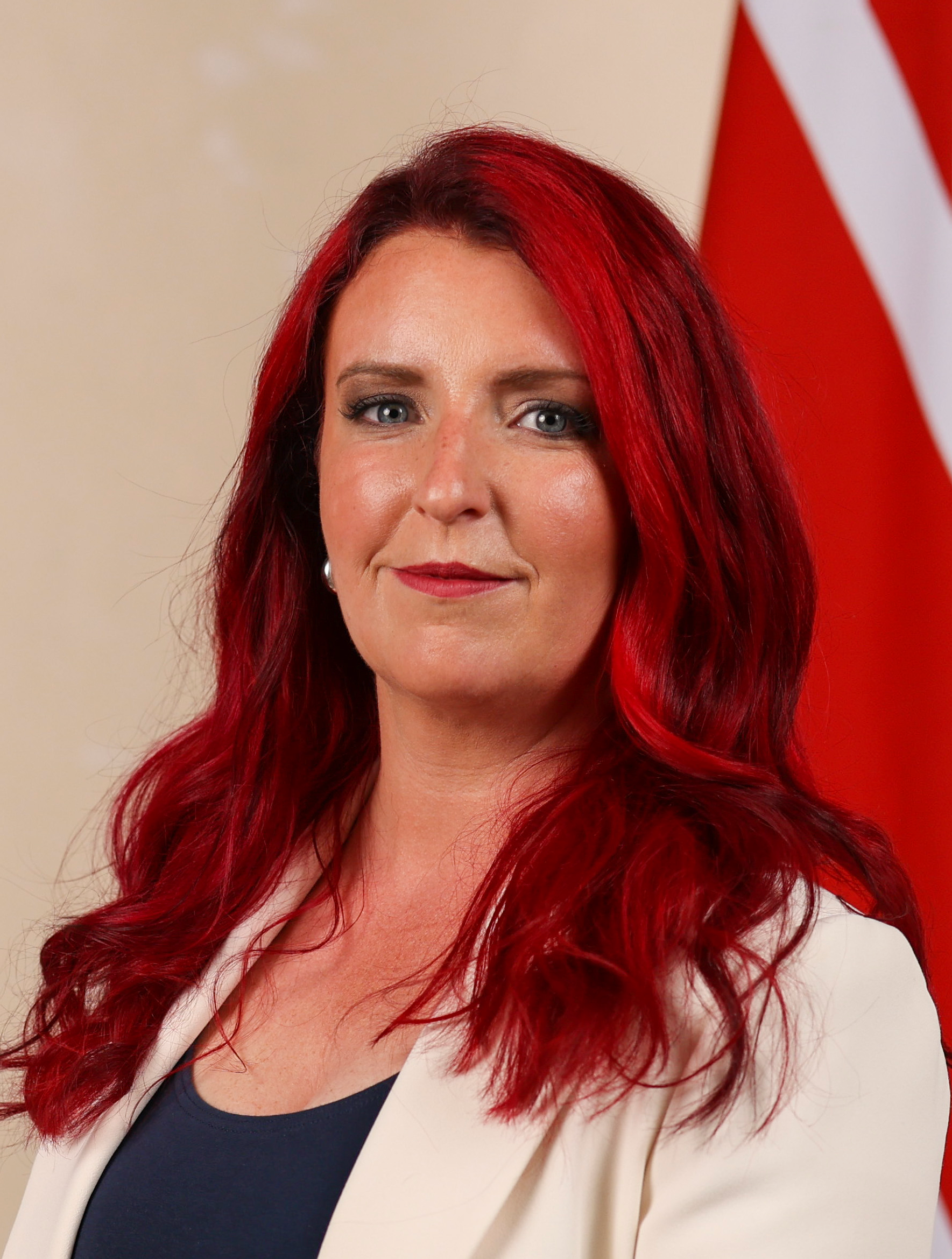
Cabinet portrait, 2024

Haigh was again re-elected at the 2024 general election, with an increased vote share of 55.2% and an increased majority of 15,304. On 5 July 2024, she was appointed as the Secretary of State for Transport in the Starmer ministry. On 10 July 2024, she was sworn into the Privy Council, entitling her to be styled "The Right Honourable" for life. At 36, she was the youngest-ever female cabinet minister.

As Transport Secretary, Haigh spearheaded reforms across the UK's transport sector. In November 2024, the Passenger Railway Services (Public Ownership) Act received Royal Assent, enabling the Government to bring passenger rail services into public ownership as existing contracts expire. Haigh also introduced legislation to extend powers over bus services to local transport authorities in England, allowing them to franchise services and, where desired, establish publicly owned bus companies.

In the October 2024 Budget, Haigh secured over £1 billion to enhance bus services nationwide, £712m for local authorities to improve services, alongside a further £243m for bus operators, and £151 million to maintain a £3 cap on single bus fares until the end of 2025.

On the 25 November 2024, Haigh launched a new Jet Zero Taskforce with some of the most senior figures in the aviation sector to support the production and delivery of sustainable aviation fuels and zero-emission flights.

While promoting the government's new Employment Rights Bill in a television interview on 9 October, Haigh urged viewers to join her in boycotting P&O Ferries after the firm had sacked hundreds of its workers with immediate notice two years prior. Speaking to ITV News, she called P&O "a rogue operator" and said it needed "cracking down on". Haigh was publicly rebuked by Starmer, who stipulated that her view was "not the view of the government". The incident came only days before a government-led international investment summit, that P&O's parent company, DP World, attended despite the controversy.

==== Resignation ====
On 28 November 2024, it became public that Haigh had pleaded guilty to fraud by false representation relating to misleading police in 2014. In a statement, Haigh said that she had been mugged on a night out in 2013 whilst working as a public policy manager for the insurer Aviva. She said that she had given the police a list of items that she thought were missing from her handbag, which wrongly included her mobile work phone supplied by Aviva. She was issued with a new phone by her employer, but Haigh said she later discovered the old phone in a drawer and switched it on. Haigh said that this signal was picked up by Aviva, who informed the police, prompting them to call Haigh in for questioning. During her police interview, Haigh said that her solicitor had advised her not to comment, and she did not respond to questions about the use of the phone when approached for comment. A case file was sent to the Crown Prosecution Service and she was charged with fraud by false representation. Six months before she was elected as an MP at the 2015 general election in November 2014, Haigh pleaded guilty when she appeared at the Camberwell Green magistrates' court, and received a conditional discharge.

Starmer spoke to Haigh on the night of 28 November and said that it would be better for her and the government if she stood down; Haigh agreed and resigned as Transport Secretary that night. The Prime Minister's spokesperson said in a briefing with reporters on 29 November that Starmer accepted Haigh's resignation following "further information emerging". In a letter to Starmer, Haigh stated that whilst she was "totally committed to our political project," she believed it would be best served supporting him from "outside government". Haigh also said that the issue would "inevitably be a distraction" from delivering on the work and policies of the government, but said she took "pride" in what they had done. In response, Starmer said that Haigh had made "huge strides" as Transport Secretary, and that she still had a "huge contribution to make in the future". She was succeeded as Transport Secretary by Heidi Alexander. The New Statesman later reported that Starmer and his team knew about the historical conviction before she was appointed Transport Secretary.

=== Return to the backbenches (2024–2026) ===
On 29 November 2024, following her resignation from government, Haigh voted in favour of the Terminally Ill Adults (End of Life) Bill, which proposed to legalise assisted suicide.

In 2025, she championed the campaign to ban non disclosure agreements in cases of harassment, abuse, and discrimination. She initially tabled an amendment to the Employment Rights Bill and held a Westminster Hall debate on the matter, which attracted cross-party support. The Government later tabled its own amendment in the House of Lords, which was approved by the Commons in September 2025, before the Bill became law at the end of the year.

Since leaving Government, Haigh has been vocal about the need for an economic reset, speaking at the 2025 Compass Conference in London, before writing an essay for the New Statesman in September 2025 on the 'fiscal straitjacket' facing the Labour Government and the need to reform the Office for Budget Responsibility and its role in economic policymaking. She followed it up with a second essay in February 2026 in which she accused the OBR of "throttling" the UK economy by not considering the long term impact of public investment in its economic forecasts.

During the summer of 2025, Haigh criticised the Labour Government's proposed cuts to Personal Independence Payments.

Haigh was part of the relaunch of the Tribune Group of Labour MPs in the autumn of 2025. Alongside fellow former frontbench colleagues Vicky Foxcroft and Justin Madders, select committee chairs Sarah Owen and Debbie Abrahams, and 2024 new MPs Yuan Yang and Beccy Cooper, Haigh took over the running of the Group and positioned it as the mainstream faction across the Parliamentary Party. It was reported to have more than 100 members, almost a quarter of the PLP.

=== Return to cabinet (2026–present) ===
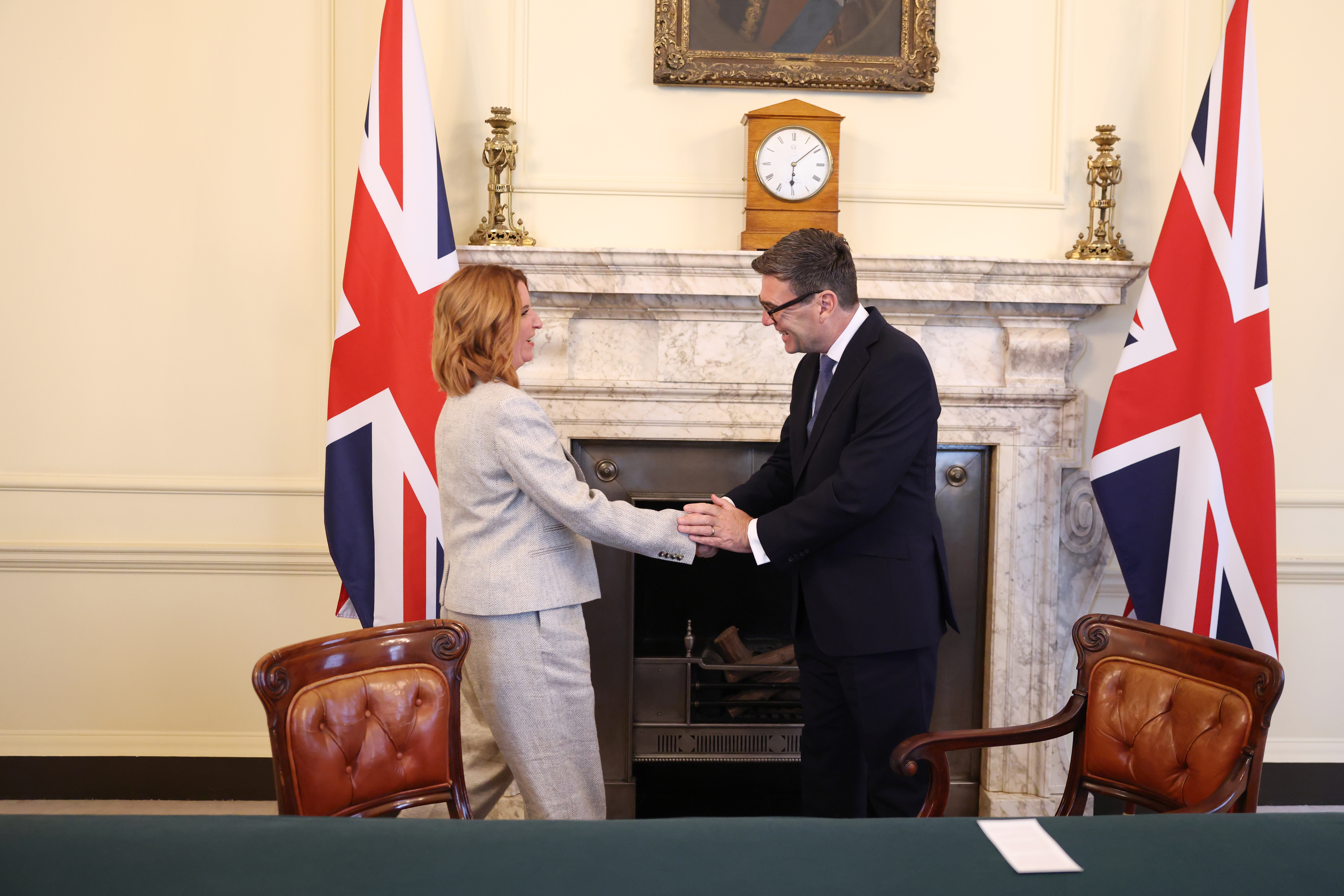
Andy Burnham appointing Haigh to his cabinet on 20 July 2026

Haigh was one of the key figures in Labour party leadership and Prime Minister hopeful Andy Burnham's 2026 Makerfield by-election victory and his leadership campaign. The New Statesman reported that, consequently, Haigh had "more power than many of the colleagues she left behind in cabinet".

On 20 July 2026, Haigh was appointed First Secretary of State, Chancellor of the Duchy of Lancaster, and Minister for the Cabinet Office under Burnham.

== Political positions ==
Haigh was one of 36 Labour MPs to nominate Jeremy Corbyn as a candidate in the Labour leadership election of 2015, although she later said she regretted this decision. She then supported and campaigned for Andy Burnham. In the 2016 Labour leadership election, Haigh supported Owen Smith.

Haigh supported the Britain Stronger in Europe campaign during the 2016 European Union membership referendum.

In 2016, Haigh called for compulsory online education alongside sex and relationships education in schools.

In the 2020 leadership election, Haigh chaired the leadership campaign of Lisa Nandy, who came third to Keir Starmer. She also nominated Angela Rayner for deputy in the 2020 deputy leadership election, which Rayner won.

== Personal life ==
In August 2025, it was reported Haigh was in a relationship with former SDLP leader, and Member of Parliament for Foyle, Colum Eastwood.

== Bibliography ==
- Dale, Iain; Smith, Jacqui (2019). The Honourable Ladies Volume II: Profiles of Women MPs 1997–2019. Biteback Publishing. ISBN 9781785904479.

Parliament of the United Kingdom
Preceded by Meg Munn	Member of Parliament for Sheffield Heeley; 2015–present	Incumbent
Political offices
Preceded by Tony Lloyd	Shadow Secretary of State for Northern Ireland; 2020–2021	Succeeded by Peter Kyle
Preceded by Jim McMahon	Shadow Secretary of State for Transport; 2021–2024	Succeeded by Helen Whately
Government offices
Preceded by Mark Harper	Secretary of State for Transport; 2024	Succeeded by Heidi Alexander
Preceded by Darren Jones	Chancellor of the Duchy of Lancaster; 2026–present	Incumbent
Vacant Title last held by Dominic Raab	First Secretary of State; 2026–present	Incumbent
Preceded by Nick Thomas-Symonds	Minister for the Cabinet Office; 2026–present	Incumbent
