= 1986 Ryedale by-election =

1986 UK parliamentary by-election

- 8 May 1986

Constituency of Ryedale
- Turnout: 67.3% (▼4.5%)
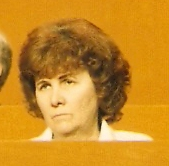
	First party	Second party	Third party
		Con	Lab
Candidate	Elizabeth Shields	Neil Balfour	Shirley Haines
Party	Liberal	Conservative	Labour
Popular vote	27,612	22,672	4,633
Percentage	50.3%	41.3%	8.4%
Swing	▲19.8%	▼17.9%	▼1.9%
MP before election
John Spence
Conservative
Subsequent MP
Elizabeth Shields
Liberal

The 1986 Ryedale by-election took place on 8 May 1986. The election was held on the same day as the 1986 local elections and the West Derbyshire by-election

It is the latest by-election to have just three candidates standing.

The seat was regained by the Conservatives the next year at the 1987 general election by John Greenway.

== Background ==
In the spring of 1986 unemployment began rising at a greater rate than in previous years and the Conservative loss at Ryedale was a factor (according to Nigel Lawson) in "even committed supporters of the Government's economic strategy...insisting that reducing unemployment should now have priority".

== Result ==
Ryedale by-election, 1986
Party	Candidate	Votes	%	±%
Liberal (Alliance)	Elizabeth Shields	27,612	50.28	+19.8
Conservative	Neil Balfour	22,672	41.28	−17.9
Labour	Shirley Haines	4,633	8.44	−1.9
Majority		4,940	9.00	N/A
Turnout		54,917	67.3	−4.5
Liberal gain from Conservative		Swing	+19.0	

== Previous general election ==
general election 1983: Ryedale
Party	Candidate	Votes	%	±%
Conservative	John Spence	33,312	59.2	
Alliance (Liberal)	Elizabeth Shields	17,170	30.5	
Labour	P Bloom	5,816	10.3	
Majority		16,142	28.7	
Turnout		56,298	71.8	
Conservative win (new seat)				

== See also ==
- Ryedale (UK Parliament constituency)
- Thirsk and Malton (UK Parliament constituency)
- List of United Kingdom by-elections
