= Sir John Lawson, 1st Baronet, of Knavesmire Lodge =

British politician

Lawson in 1895.

Sir John Grant Lawson, 1st Baronet (28 July 1856 – 27 May 1919) was a British Unionist politician.

== Life ==
He was the second son of Andrew Sherlock Lawson of Aldborough Manor, Yorkshire. He matriculated in 1875 at Christ Church, Oxford, graduating B.A. and M.A. in 1882. He was called to the bar at the Inner Temple in 1881.

At the 1892 general election, Lawson was elected as Member of Parliament (MP) for the Thirsk and Malton division of the North Riding of Yorkshire. He previously stood unsuccessfully in two Lancashire constituencies: Bury in 1885 and in Heywood 1886.

He served under Lord Salisbury and later Arthur Balfour as Parliamentary Secretary to the Local Government Board from 1900 to 1905. In December of the latter year, he was created a Baronet, of Knavesmire in the County of York. In the House, he was Chairman of the 1902 Select Committee on Repayment of Loans.

He did not contest the 1906 general election and never returned to the House of Commons.

Lawson died in May 1919, aged 62, and was succeeded in the baronetcy by his son Peter.

== Family ==
Grant Lawson married in St Margaret's Church, Westminster, on 31 July 1902, Sylvia Hunter, youngest daughter of Charles Hunter, of Selaby Hall, Darlington.

Parliament of the United Kingdom
Preceded by Lewis Dawnay	Member of Parliament for Thirsk & Malton; 1892 – 1906	Succeeded by Viscount Helmsley
Political offices
Preceded by Thomas Russell	Parliamentary Secretary to the Local Government Board; 1900–1905	Succeeded by Arthur Frederick Jeffreys
Baronetage of the United Kingdom
New creation	Baronet (of Knavesmire); 1905–1919	Succeeded by Peter Grant Lawson
