= Lewis Payn Dawnay =

English politician (1846–1910)

Lewis Payan Dawnay (1 April 1846 – 30 July 1910) was an English Conservative Party politician who sat in the House of Commons from 1880 to 1892.

Dawnay was the second son of William Dawnay, 7th Viscount Downe and his wife Mary Isabel Bagot, daughter of the Bishop of Bath and Wells. His brother Hugh was an army general and cricketer.

Dawnay was educated at Eton College and joined the Coldstream Guards, reaching the rank of Colonel.

In 1874 Dawnay stood unsuccessfully for parliament at York. At the 1880 general election he was elected as the Member of Parliament (MP) for Thirsk, and held that seat until it was replaced under the Redistribution of Seats Act 1885. He was then elected as MP for the replacement constituency of Thirsk and Malton, and held the seat until he stood down in 1892. At this time, he acquired various family properties at Newton-on-Ouse.

Dawnay married Victoria Alexandria Elizabeth Grey, daughter of Lt.-Gen. Hon. Charles Grey, in 1877. They had two sons, Guy and Alan, both of whom became Major-Generals in the British Army; and two daughters, Margaret and Marion. Margaret married the Rev. Arthur Grant and served as a Maid of Honour to Queen Alexandra.

Dawnay died at the age of 64 in 1910. The oak rood screen in the parish church at Newton-on-Ouse was given in 1911 by his widow Lady Victoria Dawnay in his memory.

Parliament of the United Kingdom
Preceded by Sir William Payne-Gallwey, Bt.	Member of Parliament for Thirsk; 1880 – 1885	Constituency abolished See Thirsk & Malton
New constituency see Thirsk constituency	Member of Parliament for Thirsk & Malton; 1885 – 1892	Succeeded by John Grant Lawson
