= Sheffield Heeley =

UK Parliament constituency in England

Coordinates: 53.35°N 1.46°W

- Borough constituency for the House of Commons
- Boundaries since 2024
- Boundary of Sheffield Heeley in Yorkshire and the Humber
- County: South Yorkshire
- Electorate: 65,373 (December 2018)

Current constituency
- Created: 1950
- Member of Parliament: Louise Haigh (Labour)
- Seats: One
- Created from: Sheffield Ecclesall and Sheffield Park

Sheffield Heeley is a constituency (Note: A borough constituency (for the purposes of election expenses and type of returning officer)) in the city of Sheffield that was created in 1950. The seat has been represented in the House of Commons of the UK Parliament by Louise Haigh of the Labour Party since 2015. (Note: As with all constituencies, the constituency elects one Member of Parliament (MP) by the first past the post system of election at least every five years.) Haigh has served as First Secretary of State, Chancellor of the Duchy of Lancaster and Minister for the Cabinet Office since July 2026.

== Constituency profile ==
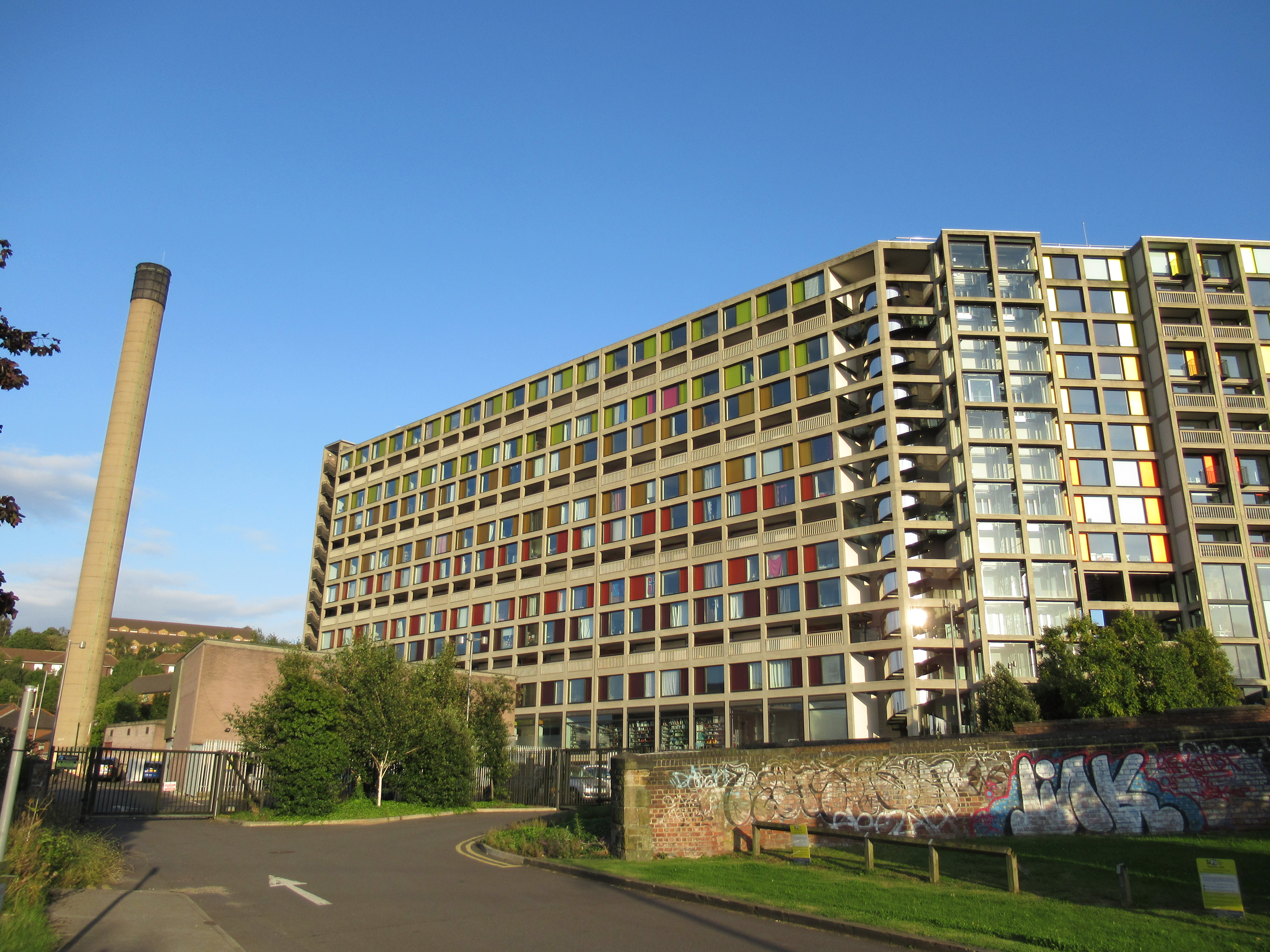
Park Hill estate

Sheffield Heeley is a constituency in South Yorkshire in England. It covers neighbourhoods to the east and south of Sheffield city centre including Heeley, Park Hill, Arbourthorne, Intake, Norton Lees, Woodseats and Greenhill.

Sheffield is traditionally an industrial city that grew rapidly during the late 18th and early 19th centuries, with steelmaking and coal mining being the predominant industries. Much of the city was redeveloped after World War II; the city's steel industry made it a target for the Luftwaffe in the Sheffield Blitz. This constituency contains a mixture of suburban neighbourhoods. The north of the constituency closer to the city centre consists mostly of 1960s council housing and is highly-deprived. The western and southern neighbourhoods are wealthier; this includes Heeley which is more inner-city in character with dense terraced housing and Greenhill which is highly-affluent. House prices across the constituency are generally lower than the rest of Yorkshire and considerably lower than the UK average.

Residents of Sheffield Heeley have a similar age profile to the rest of the country but with a below-average retired population. They have low levels of income and homeownership and the child poverty rate is high. Residents have average levels of education and a high proportion work in the education and technology sectors. The percentage claiming unemployment benefits is high. White people made up 82% of the population at the 2021 census, with Black people and Asians making up 6% each.

At the local city council, the affluent southern suburbs are represented by Liberal Democrats, the dense urban neighbourhoods by Green Party councillors and the deprived northern estates by Labour Party and Reform UK representatives. An estimated 55% of voters in Sheffield Heeley supported leaving the European Union in the 2016 referendum, marginally higher than the UK-wide rate of 52%.

== History ==
This seat was created in 1950, largely replacing the former Sheffield Ecclesall constituency, its boundaries being significantly altered in 1955 with the abolition of Sheffield Neepsend. At its first five elections, up to but excluding 1966, the seat was won by a Conservative, Peter Roberts; it changed hands three times between 1966 and 1974.

In more recent elections Sheffield Heeley moved from being a marginal Labour seat to having a solid Labour majority. Of the subsequent elections, only the 1983 and 2010 results have been fairly marginal; the others have suggested a safe Labour seat. At the 2010 election the Liberal Democrat had more than a quarter of the vote, whereas the Conservatives, on 17.3%, garnered 3% more votes than in 2005. (Note: The 8th different candidate, one for each election, since 1979.)

== Boundaries ==
Map of 2010–2024 boundaries

1950–1955: The County Borough of Sheffield wards of Heeley, Nether Edge, Norton, and Woodseats.

1955–1974: The County Borough of Sheffield wards of Heeley, Nether Edge, Norton, Sharrow, and Woodseats.

1974–1983: The County Borough of Sheffield wards of Beauchief, Gleadless, Heeley, and Intake.

1983–2010: The City of Sheffield wards of Beauchief, Heeley, Intake, Norton, and Park.

2010–2024: The City of Sheffield wards of Arbourthorne, Beauchief and Greenhill, Gleadless Valley, Graves Park, and Richmond (as they existed on 12 April 2005).

2024–present: The City of Sheffield wards of: Beauchief & Greenhill; Gleadless Valley; Graves Park; Manor Castle; Park & Arbourthorne; Richmond (polling districts UB, UC and UE) (as they existed on 1 December 2020).

After adjusting for revised ward boundaries, the Manor Castle ward was added from Sheffield Central, partly offset by the transfer of the majority of the Richmond ward to Sheffield South East.

== Members of Parliament ==
Sheffield Ecclesall and Sheffield Park prior to 1950

Election	Member	Party
1950	Peter Roberts	Conservative
1966	Frank Hooley	Labour
1970	John Spence	Conservative
Feb 1974	Frank Hooley	Labour
1983	Bill Michie	Labour
2001	Meg Munn	Labour
2015	Louise Haigh	Labour

== Elections ==
Heeley general election results

=== Elections in the 2020s ===
General election 2024: Sheffield Heeley
Party	Candidate	Votes	%	±%
Labour	Louise Haigh	21,230	55.2	+1.3
Green	Alexi Dimond	5,926	15.4	+11.1
Conservative	Lorna Maginnis	5,242	13.6	−13.5
Liberal Democrats	Rebecca Atkinson	3,863	10.0	+3.3
SDP	Helen Jackman	711	1.8	N/A
Workers Party	Steven Roy	594	1.5	N/A
Party of Women	Louise McDonald	482	1.3	N/A
TUSC	Mick Suter	398	1.0	N/A
Majority		15,304	39.8	+12.9
Turnout		38,446	52.4	–8.8
Registered electors		73,359		
Labour hold		Swing	▼4.9	

=== Elections in the 2010s ===
2019 notional result
Party	Vote	%
Labour	24,619	53.9
Conservative	12,399	27.1
Brexit Party	3,643	8.0
Liberal Democrats	3,070	6.7
Green	1,964	4.3
Turnout	45,695	61.2
Electorate	74,614	

General election 2019: Sheffield Heeley
Party	Candidate	Votes	%	±%
Labour	Louise Haigh	21,475	50.3	−9.7
Conservative	Gordon Gregory	12,955	30.3	+1.6
Brexit Party	Tracy Knowles	3,538	8.3	New
Liberal Democrats	Simon Clement-Jones	2,916	6.8	+2.2
Green	Paul Turpin	1,811	4.2	+2.1
Majority		8,520	20.0	−11.3
Turnout		42,695	63.8	−1.3
Labour hold		Swing	-5.6	

General election 2017: Sheffield Heeley
Party	Candidate	Votes	%	±%
Labour	Louise Haigh	26,524	60.0	+11.8
Conservative	Gordon Gregory	12,696	28.7	+12.5
Liberal Democrats	Joe Otten	2,022	4.6	−6.7
UKIP	Howard Denby	1,977	4.5	−12.9
Green	Declan Walsh	943	2.1	−4.0
SDP	Jaspreet Oberoi	64	0.1	New
Majority		13,828	31.3	+0.5
Turnout		44,226	65.1	+0.4
Labour hold		Swing	-0.4	

General election 2015: Sheffield Heeley
Party	Candidate	Votes	%	±%
Labour	Louise Haigh	20,269	48.2	+5.6
UKIP	Howard Denby	7,315	17.4	+13.7
Conservative	Stephen Castens	6,792	16.2	−1.1
Liberal Democrats	Simon Clement-Jones	4,746	11.3	−17.1
Green	Rita Wilcock	2,566	6.1	+3.7
TUSC	Alan Munro	238	0.6	New
English Democrat	David Haslett	122	0.3	New
Majority		12,954	30.8	+16.6
Turnout		42,048	60.7	−1.3
Labour hold		Swing		

General election 2010: Sheffield Heeley
Party	Candidate	Votes	%	±%
Labour Co-op	Meg Munn	17,409	42.6	−11.5
Liberal Democrats	Simon Clement-Jones	11,602	28.4	+7.0
Conservative	Anne Crampton	7,081	17.3	+3.0
BNP	John Beatson	2,260	5.5	+2.1
UKIP	Charlotte Arnott	1,530	3.7	+1.4
Green	Gareth Roberts	989	2.4	−1.2
Majority		5,807	14.2	−19.5
Turnout		40,871	62.0	+4.3
Labour Co-op hold		Swing	-9.25	

=== Elections in the 2000s ===
General election 2005: Sheffield Heeley
Party	Candidate	Votes	%	±%
Labour Co-op	Meg Munn	18,405	54.0	−3.0
Liberal Democrats	Colin Ross	7,035	20.6	−2.0
Conservative	Aster Crawshaw	4,987	14.6	+0.4
BNP	John Beatson	1,314	3.9	New
Green	Rob Unwin	1,312	3.9	+1.6
UKIP	Mark Suter	775	2.3	+0.4
Socialist	Mark Dunnell	265	0.8	New
Majority		11,370	33.4	−0.9
Turnout		34,093	57.1	+2.0
Labour Co-op hold		Swing	-0.5	

General election 2001: Sheffield Heeley
Party	Candidate	Votes	%	±%
Labour Co-op	Meg Munn	19,452	57.0	−3.7
Liberal Democrats	Dave Willis	7,748	22.7	+1.4
Conservative	Carolyn Abbott	4,864	14.2	−1.4
Green	Rob Unwin	774	2.3	New
Socialist Labour	Brian Fischer	667	2.0	New
UKIP	David Dunn	634	1.9	New
Majority		11,704	34.3	−5.1
Turnout		34,139	55.1	−9.9
Labour Co-op hold		Swing		

=== Elections in the 1990s ===
General election 1997: Sheffield Heeley
Party	Candidate	Votes	%	±%
Labour	Bill Michie	26,274	60.7	+5.0
Liberal Democrats	Roger Davison	9,196	21.3	+2.9
Conservative	John Harthman	6,767	15.6	−10.3
Referendum	David Mawson	1,029	2.4	New
Majority		17,078	39.4	+9.6
Turnout		43,266	65.0	−5.9
Labour hold		Swing		

General election 1992: Sheffield Heeley
Party	Candidate	Votes	%	±%
Labour	Bill Michie	28,005	55.7	+2.3
Conservative	David Beck	13,051	25.9	−0.4
Liberal Democrats	Peter Moore	9,247	18.4	−1.9
Majority		14,954	29.8	+2.7
Turnout		50,303	70.9	−1.1
Labour hold		Swing		

=== Elections in the 1980s ===
General election 1987: Sheffield Heeley
Party	Candidate	Votes	%	±%
Labour	Bill Michie	28,425	53.4	+7.6
Conservative	Nicholas Mearing-Smith	13,985	26.3	−3.6
Alliance	Peter Moore	10,811	20.3	−4.0
Majority		14,440	27.1	+11.2
Turnout		53,221	72.0	+1.5
Labour hold		Swing		

General election 1983: Sheffield Heeley
Party	Candidate	Votes	%	±%
Labour	Bill Michie	24,111	45.8	−4.0
Conservative	Sidney Cordle	15,743	29.9	−10.2
Alliance	John Day	12,813	24.3	+14.8
Majority		8,368	15.9	+5.2
Turnout		52,667	70.5	−6.8
Labour hold		Swing		

=== Elections in the 1970s ===
General election 1979: Sheffield Heeley
Party	Candidate	Votes	%	±%
Labour	Frank Hooley	24,618	49.8	−1.8
Conservative	Danny George	19,845	40.1	+8.1
Liberal	Rodney Webb	4,708	9.5	−5.4
National Front	P. K. Thorpe	274	0.6	−0.9
Majority		4,773	9.7	−9.9
Turnout		49,445	77.3	+3.8
Labour hold		Swing		

General election October 1974: Sheffield Heeley
Party	Candidate	Votes	%	±%
Labour	Frank Hooley	24,728	51.6	+3.9
Conservative	Alan Page	15,322	32.0	−3.3
Liberal	Royden Fairfax	7,151	14.9	−2.1
National Front	Peter Revell	723	1.5	New
Majority		9,406	19.6	+7.2
Turnout		47,924	73.5	−8.5
Labour hold		Swing		

General election February 1974: Sheffield Heeley
Party	Candidate	Votes	%	±%
Labour	Frank Hooley	25,317	47.7	+1.8
Conservative	Robert Ingle	18,732	35.3	−11.7
Liberal	Anthony Singleton	9,061	17.0	+9.9
Majority		6,585	12.4	N/A
Turnout		53,110	82.0	+8.6
Labour gain from Conservative		Swing		

General election 1970: Sheffield Heeley
Party	Candidate	Votes	%	±%
Conservative	John Spence	27,950	47.0	+1.0
Labour	Frank Hooley	27,237	45.9	−8.1
Liberal	Anthony Singleton	4,220	7.1	New
Majority		713	1.1	N/A
Turnout		59,407	73.4	−5.3
Conservative gain from Labour		Swing		

=== Elections in the 1960s ===
General election 1966: Sheffield Heeley
Party	Candidate	Votes	%	±%
Labour	Frank Hooley	31,996	54.0	+5.5
Conservative	John Spence	27,267	46.0	−5.5
Majority		4,729	8.0	N/A
Turnout		59,263	78.7	+2.7
Labour gain from Conservative		Swing		

General election 1964: Sheffield Heeley
Party	Candidate	Votes	%	±%
Conservative	Peter Roberts	29,587	51.5	−7.5
Labour	Frank Hooley	27,883	48.5	+7.5
Majority		1,704	3.0	−15.0
Turnout		57,470	76.0	−1.6
Conservative hold		Swing		

=== Elections in the 1950s ===
General election 1959: Sheffield Heeley
Party	Candidate	Votes	%	±%
National Liberal	Peter Roberts	33,236	59.0	−1.9
Labour	Joan Mellors	23,109	41.0	+1.9
Majority		10,127	18.0	−3.8
Turnout		56,345	77.6	+0.6
National Liberal hold		Swing		

General election 1955: Sheffield Heeley
Party	Candidate	Votes	%	±%
National Liberal	Peter Roberts	30,798	60.9	−0.1
Labour	John Sewell	19,747	39.1	+0.1
Majority		11,051	21.8	−0.2
Turnout		50,545	77.0	−7.6
National Liberal hold		Swing		

General election 1951: Sheffield Heeley
Party	Candidate	Votes	%	±%
National Liberal	Peter Roberts	27,776	61.0	+4.7
Labour	Arnold Jennings	17,729	39.0	+1.2
Majority		10,047	22.0	+3.5
Turnout		45,505	84.6	−3.5
National Liberal hold		Swing		

General election 1950: Sheffield Heeley
Party	Candidate	Votes	%	±%
National Liberal	Peter Roberts	26,560	56.3	
Labour	Arnold Jennings	17,856	37.8	
Liberal	Phillip Beckerlegge	2,779	5.9	
Majority		8,704	18.5	
Turnout		47,195	88.1	
National Liberal win (new seat)				

== See also ==
- Districts of Sheffield
- List of parliamentary constituencies in the Yorkshire and the Humber (region)
- Parliamentary constituencies in South Yorkshire
