= Thirsk and Malton =

UK Parliament constituency (1885–1983, 2010 onwards)

- County constituency for the House of Commons
- Boundaries since 2024
- Boundary of Thirsk and Malton in Yorkshire and the Humber
- County: North Yorkshire
- Electorate: 79,964 (December 2019)
- Major settlements: Pickering, Filey, Thirsk, Bedale, Malton

Current constituency
- Created: 2010
- Member of Parliament: Kevin Hollinrake (Conservative)
- Seats: One
- Created from: Ryedale (majority); Vale of York (part)

1885–1983
- Seats: One
- Created from: Thirsk and Malton; preceded by North Riding of Yorkshire
- Replaced by: Ryedale, Richmond (Yorks), Selby and Skipton and Ripon

Thirsk and Malton is a constituency in North Yorkshire represented in the House of Commons of the UK Parliament since 2015 by Kevin Hollinrake, a Conservative.

== Constituency profile ==
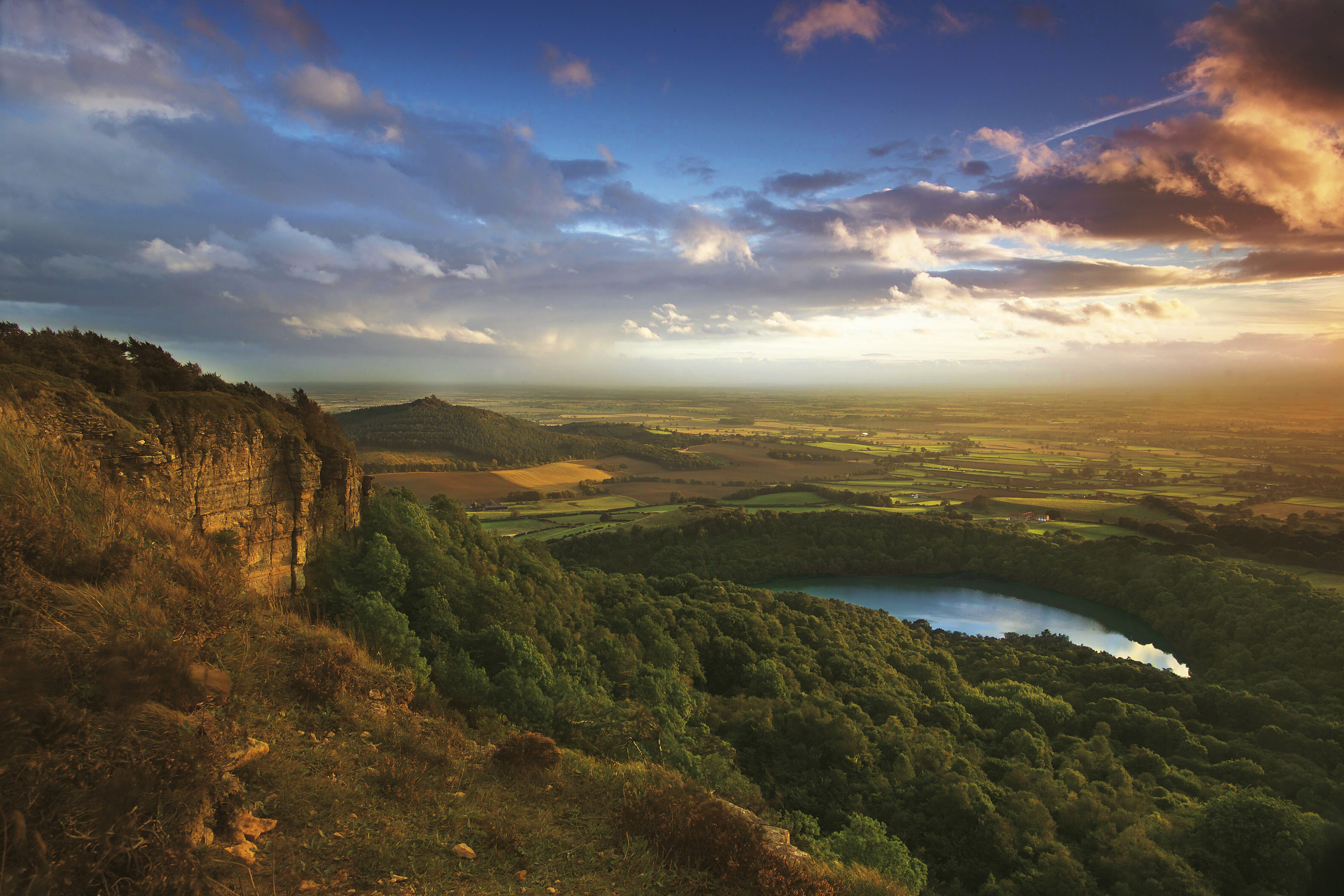
Sutton Bank

Thirsk and Malton is a constituency in North Yorkshire in England. It is named after the towns of Thirsk and Malton, although its largest town is Norton-on-Derwent which lies adjacent to Malton and has a population of around 8,000. Other settlements include the towns of Bedale, Helmsley, Kirkbymoorside, Pickering and Filey and the villages of Sowerby and Hunmanby.

This is a large, rural and sparsely-populated constituency with many small towns and villages. It stretches from Bedale in the west, which is close to the Yorkshire Dales, to the seaside town of Filey in the east, close to Scarborough. Much of the north of the constituency is taken up by the North York Moors, a national park of upland heather moors. Many of the settlements here are market towns of medieval origin and are popular with tourists. The constituency is mostly wealthy; there is some deprivation in Filey but the towns of Thirsk and Malton are affluent. Malton has been named as one of the best places to live in the country by The Sunday Times. House prices across the constituency are generally higher than the rest of Yorkshire but lower than the UK average.

Thirsk and Malton has low proportions of young and middle-aged adults and a large retired population. Residents have average levels of income and homeownership and the child poverty rate is below-average. Residents have average levels of education and many are religious. A high proportion of residents work in the agriculture, manufacturing and tourism sectors, and the percentage claiming unemployment benefits is very low. White people made up 98% of the population at the 2021 census.

At the local council, most of this constituency is represented by Conservatives with some independents elected in Malton and Filey. An estimated 57% of voters in Thirsk and Malton supported leaving the European Union in the 2016 referendum, higher than the UK-wide figure of 52%.

== History ==
The constituency was first created under the Redistribution of Seats Act 1885 as a county division of the North Riding of Yorkshire. It continued in existence until the 1983 general election, when it was largely replaced by Ryedale following the reorganisation of local government in 1974. Under the Fifth periodic review of Westminster constituencies, coming into effect for the 2010 general election, Ryedale was abolished and Thirsk and Malton re-established.

=== Political history ===
Under both periods of its existence, the constituency has been a safe Conservative seat, although the Ryedale seat (replacing Thirsk and Malton from 1983 to 2010) was taken by Elizabeth Shields for the Liberal Party, following a by-election in 1986, held following the death of MP John Spence, and she held it for one year until the 1987 general election.

Robin Turton was the Minister of Health (head of department in that era) from December 1955 to January 1957. He also became father of the House and was among the longest-serving MPs for a single constituency, representing his seat for 44 years and 9 months.

Anne McIntosh, a Conservative, was elected for Vale of York in 1997 and then in Thirsk and Malton in 2010, having defeated fellow MP John Greenway in the Conservative selection. From 2010 until 2015 she chaired the Environment, Food and Rural Affairs Select Committee. In 2014, she was deselected as the Conservative candidate with Kevin Hollinrake elected as MP in 2015.

== Boundaries ==
=== Historic ===
Map of 2010–2024 boundaries

1918–1950: The Urban District of Malton, the Rural Districts of Easingwold, Flaxton, Helmsley, Kirkbymoorside, Malton, Thirsk, and Wath, and part of the Rural District of Pickering.

1950–1974: The Urban District of Malton, the Rural Districts of Bedale, Easingwold, Flaxton, Helmsley, Kirkbymoorside, Malton, Thirsk, and Wath, and part of the Rural District of Pickering.

1974–1983: The Urban District of Malton, and the Rural Districts of Bedale, Easingwold, Flaxton, Helmsley, Kirkbymoorside, Malton, Thirsk, and Wath.

The constituency was abolished for 1983 general election and re-established by the Fifth periodic review of Westminster constituencies, coming into effect for the 2010 general election.

2010–2024: The District of Ryedale, the District of Hambleton wards of Easingwold, Helperby, Huby and Sutton, Shipton, Sowerby, Stillington, Thirsk, Thorntons, Tollerton, Topcliffe, White Horse, and Whitestonecliffe, and the Borough of Scarborough wards of Filey and Hertford.

=== Current ===
Under the 2023 review of Westminster constituencies, the seat was defined as being composed of the following as they existed on 1 December 2020:

- The District of Hambleton wards of: Bagby & Thorntons; Bedale; Sowerby & Topcliffe; Tanfield; Thirsk.
- The District of Ryedale.
- The Borough of Scarborough wards of: Filey; Hunmanby.

On 1 April 2023, before the new boundaries came into effect, the Borough of Scarborough and Districts of Hambleton and Ryedale were abolished and absorbed into the new unitary authority of North Yorkshire. Consequently, the constituency now comprises the following from the 2024 general election:

- The District of North Yorkshire electoral districts of: Amotherby & Ampleforth; Aiskew & Leeming; Bedale; Helmsley & Sinnington; Filey; Hillside & Raskelf (majority); Hunmanby & Sherburn; Kirkbymoorside & Dales; Malton; Norton; Pickering; Sheriff Hutton & Derwent; Sowerby & Topcliffe; Thirsk; Thornton Dales & Wolds.

In order to bring its electorate within the permitted range, the south-western part of the constituency, including Easingwold, was included in the newly created constituency of Wetherby and Easingwold. To partly compensate, Bedale and Tanfield were added from Richmond (Yorks) – renamed Richmond and Northallerton.

== Members of Parliament ==
=== MPs 1885–1983 ===
Thirsk and Malton prior to 1885

Year	Member	Party
1885	Lewis Payn Dawnay	Conservative
1892	Sir John Lawson	Conservative
1906	Charles Duncombe	Conservative
1915	Sir Edmund Turton	Unionist
1929	Sir Robin Turton	Conservative
1974	John Spence	Conservative
1983	Constituency abolished	

=== MPs since 2010 ===
Ryedale prior to 2010

Election	Member	Party
2010	Anne McIntosh	Conservative
2015	Kevin Hollinrake	Conservative

== Elections from 2010 ==
=== Elections in the 2020s ===
General election 2024: Thirsk and Malton
Party	Candidate	Votes	%	±%
Conservative	Kevin Hollinrake	19,544	39.2	−23.3
Labour	Lisa Banes	11,994	24.1	+6.3
Reform	Mark Robinson	8,963	18.0	New
Liberal Democrats	Steve Mason	5,379	10.8	−1.7
Green	Richard McLane	2,986	6.0	+1.5
Yorkshire	Luke Brownlee	931	1.9	+0.2
Majority		7,550	15.1	−29.6
Turnout		49,797	63.4	−4.7
Registered electors		78,484		
Conservative hold		Swing	−14.8	

=== Elections in the 2010s ===
2019 notional result
Party	Vote	%
Conservative	32,624	62.5
Labour	9,287	17.8
Liberal Democrats	6,502	12.5
Green	2,348	4.5
Others	1,437	2.8
Turnout	52,198	68.1
Electorate	76,623	

General election 2019: Thirsk and Malton
Party	Candidate	Votes	%	±%
Conservative	Kevin Hollinrake	35,634	63.0	+3.0
Labour	David Yellen	10,480	18.5	−7.6
Liberal Democrats	Di Keal	6,774	12.0	+5.1
Green	Martin Brampton	2,263	4.0	+2.0
Yorkshire	John Hall	881	1.6	New
Independent	Steve Mullins	245	0.4	New
Independent	Gordon Johnson	184	0.3	New
SDP	Michael Taylor	127	0.2	New
Majority		25,154	44.5	+10.6
Turnout		56,588	69.9	−1.2
Conservative hold		Swing	+5.2	

General election 2017: Thirsk and Malton
Party	Candidate	Votes	%	±%
Conservative	Kevin Hollinrake	33,572	60.0	+7.4
Labour	Alan Avery	14,571	26.1	+10.7
Liberal Democrats	Di Keal	3,859	6.9	−2.1
UKIP	Toby Horton	1,532	2.7	−12.2
Green	Martin Brampton	1,100	2.0	−2.6
Liberal	John Clark	753	1.3	−0.9
Independent	Philip Tate	542	1.0	−0.3
Majority		19,001	33.9	−3.3
Turnout		55,929	71.1	+3.5
Conservative hold		Swing	−1.6	

General election 2015: Thirsk and Malton
Party	Candidate	Votes	%	±%
Conservative	Kevin Hollinrake	27,545	52.6	−0.3
Labour	Alan Avery	8,089	15.4	+1.8
UKIP	Toby Horton	7,805	14.9	+8.3
Liberal Democrats	Di Keal	4,703	9.0	−14.3
Green	Chris Newsam	2,404	4.6	New
Liberal	John Clark	1,127	2.2	−1.5
Independent	Philip Tate	692	1.3	New
Majority		19,456	37.2	+7.6
Turnout		52,365	67.6	+17.6
Conservative hold		Swing	−1.1	

General election 2010: Thirsk and Malton
Party	Candidate	Votes	%	±%
Conservative	Anne McIntosh	20,167	52.9	+1.0
Liberal Democrats	Howard Keal	8,886	23.3	+4.5
Labour	Jonathan Roberts	5,169	13.6	−9.8
UKIP	Toby Horton	2,502	6.6	+3.5
Liberal	John Clark	1,418	3.7	New
Majority		11,281	29.6	+1.1
Turnout		38,142	50.0	−15.8
Conservative hold		Swing	+5.4	

Thirsk and Malton was originally scheduled to be contested for the first time at the general election on 6 May 2010. However, the death of UKIP candidate John Boakes from a suspected heart attack, announced on 22 April 2010, caused the poll in the constituency to be postponed until 27 May 2010. Under the Electoral Administration Act, UKIP were allowed to select a replacement candidate, but new nominations by other parties were not permitted. The constituent parties of the Conservative – Liberal Democrat coalition government formed in the aftermath of the general election fielded competing candidates.

In January 2014, Conservative Anne McIntosh — the MP at the time — was not re-selected by the local party. McIntosh originally announced she would stand as an independent, but withdrew in March 2015.

== Election results 1885–1983 ==
Decades:	1880s; 1890s; 1900s; 1910s; 1920s; 1930s; 1940s; 1950s; 1960s; 1970s

=== Elections in the 1880s ===
General election 1885: Thirsk and Malton
Party	Candidate	Votes	%	±%
Conservative	Lewis Payn Dawnay	5,966	57.0	N/A
Liberal	Edmund Turton	4,503	43.0	N/A
Majority		1,463	14.0	N/A
Turnout		10,469	82.8	N/A
Registered electors		12,637		
Conservative win (new seat)				

General election 1886: Thirsk and Malton
Party	Candidate	Votes	%	±%
Conservative	Lewis Payn Dawnay	Unopposed		
Conservative hold				

=== Elections in the 1890s ===
Reckitt

General election 1892: Thirsk and Malton
Party	Candidate	Votes	%	±%
Conservative	John Lawson	5,890	62.5	N/A
Liberal	Harold Reckitt	3,541	37.5	N/A
Majority		2,349	25.0	N/A
Turnout		9,431	77.2	N/A
Registered electors		12,220		
Conservative hold		Swing		

Lawson

General election 1895: Thirsk and Malton
Party	Candidate	Votes	%	±%
Conservative	John Lawson	Unopposed		
Conservative hold				

=== Elections in the 1900s ===
General election 1900: Thirsk and Malton
Party	Candidate	Votes	%	±%
Conservative	John Lawson	Unopposed		
Conservative hold				

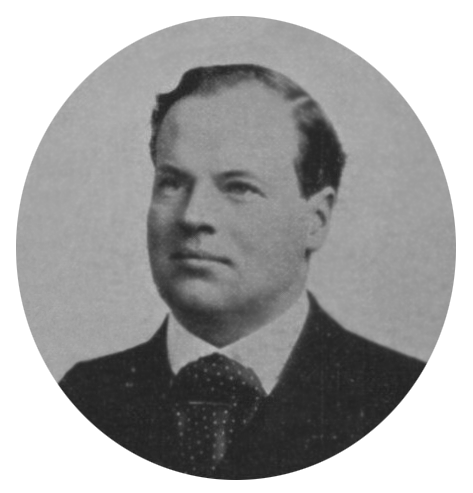
Helmsley

General election 1906: Thirsk and Malton
Party	Candidate	Votes	%	±%
Conservative	Charles Duncombe	5,848	53.7	N/A
Liberal	John J Brigg	5,044	46.3	N/A
Majority		804	7.4	N/A
Turnout		10,892	84.5	N/A
Registered electors		12,888		
Conservative hold		Swing		

=== Elections in the 1910s ===
General election January 1910: Thirsk and Malton
Party	Candidate	Votes	%	±%
Conservative	Charles Duncombe	6,382	55.1	+1.4
Liberal	John J Brigg	5,197	46.9	−1.4
Majority		1,185	10.2	+2.8
Turnout		11,579		
Conservative hold		Swing	+1.4	

General election December 1910: Thirsk and Malton
Party	Candidate	Votes	%	±%
Conservative	Charles Duncombe	Unopposed		
Conservative hold				

Nicholls

General Election 1914–15:

Another General Election was required to take place before the end of 1915. The political parties had been making preparations for an election to take place and by July 1914, the following candidates had been selected;

- Unionist: Edmund Turton
- Liberal: George Nicholls

1915 Thirsk and Malton by-election
Party	Candidate	Votes	%	±%
Unionist	Edmund Turton	Unopposed		
Unionist hold				

General election 1918: Thirsk and Malton
Party		Candidate	Votes	%	±%
C	Unionist	Edmund Turton	9,656	69.1	N/A
	Liberal	Samuel S Lockwood	4,317	30.9	N/A
Majority			5,339	38.2	N/A
Turnout			13,973		N/A
	Unionist hold				
C indicates candidate endorsed by the coalition government.

=== Elections in the 1920s ===
General election 1922: Thirsk and Malton
Party	Candidate	Votes	%	±%
Unionist	Edmund Turton	Unopposed		
Unionist hold				

General election 1923: Thirsk and Malton
Party	Candidate	Votes	%	±%
Unionist	Edmund Turton	11,545	62.5	N/A
Liberal	William Haughton Sessions	6,939	37.5	N/A
Majority		4,606	25.0	N/A
Turnout		18,484		N/A
Unionist hold		Swing		

General election 1924: Thirsk and Malton
Party	Candidate	Votes	%	±%
Unionist	Edmund Turton	13,564	65.7	+3.2
Liberal	William Haughton Sessions	7,072	34.3	−3.2
Majority		6,492	31.4	+6.4
Turnout		20,636		
Unionist hold		Swing	+3.2	

General election 1929: Thirsk and Malton
Party	Candidate	Votes	%	±%
Unionist	Robert Turton	16,084	59.2	−6.5
Liberal	Thomas Sunley	11,069	40.8	+6.5
Majority		5,015	18.5	−13.0
Turnout		27,153	73.7	
Unionist hold		Swing	+6.5	

=== Elections in the 1930s ===
General election 1931: Thirsk and Malton
Party	Candidate	Votes	%	±%
Conservative	Robert Turton	Unopposed		
Conservative hold				

General election 1935: Thirsk and Malton
Party	Candidate	Votes	%	±%
Conservative	Robert Turton	Unopposed		
Conservative hold				

=== Election in the 1940s ===
General Election 1939–40:

Another General Election was required to take place before the end of 1940. The political parties had been making preparations for an election to take place and by July 1939, the following candidates had been selected;

- Conservative: Robert Turton

General election 1945: Thirsk and Malton
Party	Candidate	Votes	%	±%
Conservative	Robert Turton	20,483	60.15	N/A
Common Wealth	Edward Moeran	13,572	39.85	N/A
Majority		6,911	20.29	N/A
Turnout		34,055	65.55	N/A
Conservative hold		Swing		

=== Elections in the 1950s ===
General election 1950: Thirsk and Malton
Party	Candidate	Votes	%	±%
Conservative	Robert Turton	26,324	65.41	
Labour	Ivan Ernest Geffen	11,480	28.53	N/A
Liberal	Harry Aldam	2,441	6.07	N/A
Majority		14,844	36.88	
Turnout		40,245	81.51	
Conservative hold		Swing		

General election 1951: Thirsk and Malton
Party	Candidate	Votes	%	±%
Conservative	Robert Turton	27,854	72.26	
Labour	Arnold John Parkinson	10,692	27.74	
Majority		17,162	44.52	
Turnout		38,546	77.41	
Conservative hold		Swing		

General election 1955: Thirsk and Malton
Party	Candidate	Votes	%	±%
Conservative	Robert Turton	25,467	69.11	
Labour	George R Mitton	11,382	30.89	
Majority		14,085	38.22	
Turnout		36,849	73.39	
Conservative hold		Swing		

General election 1959: Thirsk and Malton
Party	Candidate	Votes	%	±%
Conservative	Robert Turton	27,413	69.00	
Labour	Jeremy Bray	12,318	31.00	
Majority		15,095	37.99	
Turnout		39,731	75.65	
Conservative hold		Swing		

=== Elections in the 1960s ===
General election 1964: Thirsk and Malton
Party	Candidate	Votes	%	±%
Conservative	Robert Turton	28,272	66.39	
Labour	Daniel Lorden Hussey	14,315	33.61	
Majority		13,957	32.77	
Turnout		42,587	73.81	
Conservative hold		Swing		

General election 1966: Thirsk and Malton
Party	Candidate	Votes	%	±%
Conservative	Robert Turton	25,089	61.59	
Labour	Richard A Wilson	15,647	38.41	
Majority		9,442	23.18	
Turnout		40,736	70.27	
Conservative hold		Swing		

=== Elections in the 1970s ===
General election 1970: Thirsk and Malton
Party	Candidate	Votes	%	±%
Conservative	Robert Turton	30,892	66.86	
Labour	Jonathan Bradshaw	15,309	33.14	
Majority		15,583	33.73	
Turnout		46,201	72.34	
Conservative hold		Swing		

General election February 1974: Thirsk and Malton
Party	Candidate	Votes	%	±%
Conservative	John Spence	27,580	53.44	
Liberal	Michael Brooks	13,172	25.52	N/A
Labour	MD Coupe	10,855	21.03	
Majority		14,408	27.92	
Turnout		51,607	81.46	
Conservative hold		Swing		

General election October 1974: Thirsk and Malton
Party	Candidate	Votes	%	±%
Conservative	John Spence	24,779	53.24	
Liberal	Rodney Kent	10,917	23.46	
Labour	RK Illingworth	10,842	23.30	
Majority		13,862	29.79	
Turnout		46,538	72.88	
Conservative hold		Swing		

General election 1979: Thirsk and Malton
Party	Candidate	Votes	%	±%
Conservative	John Spence	32,520	59.15	
Labour	EJ Roberts	11,924	21.69	
Liberal	Rex North	10,533	19.16	
Majority		20,596	37.46	
Turnout		54,977	76.46	
Conservative hold		Swing		

== See also ==
- Parliamentary constituencies in North Yorkshire
- List of parliamentary constituencies in the Yorkshire and the Humber (region)

== Notes and references ==
Notes
