= Meg Munn =

British Labour Co-op politician (born 1959)

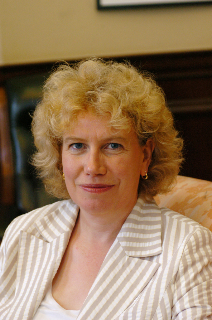
- Munn as a Foreign Office minister

Parliamentary Under-Secretary of State for Foreign and Commonwealth Affairs
- In office 29 June 2007 – 5 October 2008
- Prime Minister: Gordon Brown
- Preceded by: The Lord Triesman
- Succeeded by: Gillian Merron

Parliamentary Secretary for Women and Equalities
- In office 5 May 2005 – 27 June 2007
- Prime Minister: Tony Blair
- Preceded by: Jacqui Smith
- Succeeded by: Barbara Follett

Member of Parliament for Sheffield Heeley
- In office 7 June 2001 – 30 March 2015
- Preceded by: Bill Michie
- Succeeded by: Louise Haigh

Personal details
- Born: Margaret Patricia Munn; 24 August 1959 (age 66) Sheffield, West Riding of Yorkshire, England
- Party: Labour Co-operative
- Spouse: Dennis Bates (m. 1989)
- Education: Rowlinson School
- Alma mater: University of York (BA); University of Nottingham (MA)

Margaret Patricia Munn (born 24 August 1959) is a former politician who served as a Labour MP for Sheffield Heeley from 2001 to 2015. After leaving Parliament, she has served in a variety of roles across the public sector, academia and international bodies.

== Before Parliament ==
Munn went to Mundella Primary School on Mundella Place in Norton Woodseats, then the comprehensive Rowlinson School on Dyche Lane in Jordanthorpe, Sheffield from 1970 to 1977, (the site became Norton College Campus of Sheffield College, but the old school transferred to Meadowhead School across the road in 1988).

She studied languages at the University of York receiving a BA (Hons) in 1981, later gaining an MA in social work at the University of Nottingham in 1986. Munn later gained a Certificate and Diploma in Management Studies from the Open University and in 2012 became the first MP to be awarded Chartered Manager status by the Chartered Management Institute, subsequently becoming a Fellow of the Institute.

She worked as a social work Assistant for Berkshire County Council from 1981–84; as a social worker for Nottinghamshire County Council from 1986–90, becoming a senior social worker from 1990–92; as a district manager for Barnsley Metropolitan Borough Council Social Services from 1992–96, as a child services manager for Wakefield Metropolitan Borough Council from 1996–99; and assistant director of City of York Council Children's Services from 1999–2000.

She joined the Labour Party at fifteen, and was a councillor on Nottingham City Council from 1987–91. Munn was on the Barnsley Regional Board of the Co-operative Group, the UK's largest co-operative society, and the management committee of Wortley Hall, a national co-operative conference centre. She was elected President of the 2006 Co-operative Congress She is a member of USDAW, the Labour Party and the Co-operative Party.

== Member of Parliament ==
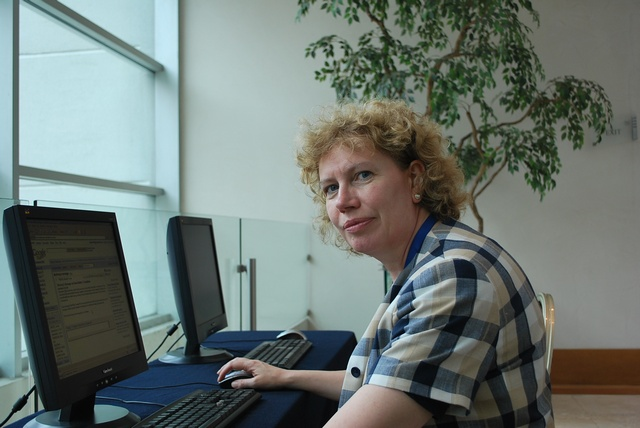
Munn attending the Policy Network Progressive Governance Conference 2009

Munn was Patron of Heeley City Farm, Patron of Home-Start Sheffield and Patron of Sheffield Young Carers.

As a backbencher, Munn served on the Education and Skills Select Committee 2001–03, and the Procedure Select Committee 2001–02. She was closely involved with the Adoption and Children Act 2002; changing national regulations to allow Local Authorities to register body-piercing studios; supporting small business, including co-operative and mutual enterprises; encouraging women to go into business; and House of Lord's reform. She also served as Chair of the Women's Committee of the Parliamentary Labour Party (2003–05) and Chair of the Parliamentary Co-operative Group (2004–05). She has been Vice-Chair of Labour Friends of Israel, a vice-chair of the group Progress and Chair of the All-Party Parliamentary Voice group.

Munn served as parliamentary private secretary at the Department for Education and Skills from July 2003 to 2004 and then continuing to be a PPS at the department attached to the Minister of State for Education until May 2005. She was Minister for Women and Equality, based at the Department for Communities and Local Government from May 2005 until June 2007. Munn introduced civil partnerships in the UK in December 2005. She was responsible for the Equality Act 2006, and involved in the Work and Families Act 2006. She established the Equality and Human Rights Commission). She was not able to take a ministerial salary, as the maximum number of paid ministers, had been appointed. This was criticised by the opposition.

Munn argued strongly in support of the coalition government's plan to participate in military strikes against the Syrian Government in the wake of a chemical-weapons attack at Ghouta in the vote on 29 August 2013, contrary to the Labour Party's position. She was one of four Labour MPs who did not vote against the government motion, which the government lost. Ultimately a negotiated agreement was reached to eliminate Syria's chemical weapons.

On 29 June 2007, Munn was appointed as the Parliamentary Under-Secretary of State for Foreign Affairs in the Foreign and Commonwealth Office. Amongst her responsibilities were Overseas Territories, South East Asia, Australia, New Zealand, and the Caribbean and Central America. She stood down from the government in October 2008.

She was Chair of the UK government-funded Westminster Foundation for Democracy from October 2008 to July 2010, and Vice-Chair July 2010 to October 2012. With the Foundation, Munn worked on the Middle East and North Africa, leading workshops and mentoring MPs on Egypt, the Kurdistan region of Iraq, Morocco and Jordan. The Foundation was established in 1992 to promote democracy mainly in Eastern Europe, the Middle East and Africa. It is a cross-party political organisation that provides support and funding to establish and maintain democratic forms of government.

Munn established and was chair of the Child Protection All-Party Parliamentary Group, Chair of the Kurdistan Region of Iraq All-Party Parliamentary Group, Chair of the Methodist All-Party Parliamentary Group, Vice-Chair of the Women in Enterprise All-Party Parliamentary Group, Vice-Chair of the Engineering and Information Technology All-Party Parliamentary Group, Vice-Chair of the Yorkshire and North Lincolnshire All-Party Parliamentary Group, and Vice-Chair of the Mexican All-Party Parliamentary Group.

On 24 January 2014 she advised Heeley Constituency Labour Party that she had decided not to seek reselection to stand at the 2015 general election.

== Expenses claims ==
On 26 May 2009, Meg Munn was criticised after The Daily Telegraph published an article reporting that her husband, who was employed part-time as her parliamentary aide, was paid more than £5,000 from public funds over four years for professional services in connection with their personal taxation affairs to at least five government ministers, and his wife. The article reported that when Munn published her receipt for these services on her website, she blacked out the portion indicating that her husband was the beneficiary of her expenses. Munn said on her website that the blacking out had been done by the House of Commons, which deleted details considered to be a personal security risk; her husband's name was deleted for one year, presumably in error, but published for three other years. Munn said that neither she nor her staff had redacted details.

Labour MPs argued that tax advice relating to their work as MPs was a legitimate expense, and the Labour Party issued a statement supporting this view. Business groups expressed concerns that MPs might be being "treated differently" to other taxpayers, saying, "If entrepreneurs sought professional tax advice, they had to pay the fee themselves and offset it against any profits on which they paid tax". Munn was one of 98 MPs who voted in favour of legislation which would have kept MPs' expense details secret.

== Post-Parliamentary career ==
From August 2015 to July 2023 Munn served as pro-chancellor and Deputy Chair, and from July 2023 to April 2024 as Interim Chair, of the Board of Governors of Sheffield Hallam University. She is currently the Senior Independent Director of the Phone-paid Services Authority. Previously she was Chair of the British Council's Society Advisory Group (2017–2021) and a Non-Executive Director of the Esh Group (2015–2018).

She is also an international governance consultant with a focus on parliamentary processes, political party development, gender mainstreaming and women's leadership. She works with organisations such as Global Partners Governance, Inter-Parliamentary Union, United Nations Development Programme, the Office for Democratic Institutions and Human Rights, Commonwealth Parliamentary Association, UN Women, the Kenya Women Parliamentarians' Association (KEWOPA) and the Iraq Foundation to support democracy building in a number of countries. She is author of Participatory Gender Audits of Parliaments: a Step by Step Guidance Document (2022) and Lead drafter for the Compendium of Good Practises for Advancing Women's Political Participation in the OSCE Region (2016), Office for Democratic Institutions and Human Rights.

She supports women to consider non-traditional careers in science, technology, engineering and mathematics (STEM), and construction. She has been a Patron of the Women's Engineering Society and has edited Building the future: women in construction, Smith Institute (2014) and Unlocking Potential: perspectives on women in science, engineering & technology, Smith Institute (2011).

She was the first independent Chair of the Church of England's National Safeguarding Panel and then the acting Chair of the Independent Safeguarding Board. She resigned from both positions on 12 July 2023.

== Personal life ==
Munn is fluent in German and French, conversational Italian and Spanish. She has long been an active member of the Methodist Church. She has been married to Dennis Bates since 1989.

=== Publications ===
- Author Participatory Gender Audits of Parliaments: a Step by Step Guidance Document Office for Democratic Institutions and Human Rights (2022).
- Lead drafter "Compendium of Good Practises for Advancing Women's Political Participation in the OSCE Region", Office for Democratic Institutions and Human Rights (2016).
- Edited Building the future: women in construction, Smith Institute (2014).
- Seminar series on child sexual abuse, Child Protection All-Party Parliamentary Group. NSPCC (2014).
- Making care proceedings better for children, Child Protection All-Party Parliamentary Group.NSPCC (2013).
- Edited Unlocking Potential: perspectives on women in science, engineering & technology, Smith Institute (2011).
- Vetting and Disclosures: Getting it right in practice, Child Protection All-Party Parliamentary Group.NSPCC (2011).
- An essay in Making the progressive case for Israel, Labour Friends of Israel (2011).
- President's Address to the Co-operative Congress, Co-operatives UK (2006).
- Foreword to Diversity and the Economy, Tony Pilch, Smith Institute (2006).
- An essay in Labour Looks to Israel, ed P.Richards, Labour Friends of Israel (2005).
- Co-edited Family Fortunes: the New Politics of Childhood, eds Patrick Diamond, Sunder Katwala & Meg Munn, Fabian Society (2004)

Parliament of the United Kingdom
Preceded by Bill Michie	Member of Parliament for Sheffield Heeley; 2001–2015	Succeeded by Louise Haigh
Political offices
Preceded by Tessa Jowell	Parliamentary Under Secretary of State (Women and Equality), Minister for Equality; 2005–2007	Succeeded by Barbara Follett
Preceded by David Triesman	Parliamentary Under-Secretary of State for Foreign Affairs; 2007–2008	Succeeded by Gillian Merron
