= 1915 Thirsk and Malton by-election =

UK parliamentary by-election

The 1915 Thirsk and Malton by-election was a parliamentary by-election held on 12 February 1915 for the British House of Commons constituency of Thirsk and Malton in the North Riding of Yorkshire.

The seat had become vacant when the sitting Conservative Member of Parliament Viscount Helmsley succeeded to the peerage as the 2nd Earl of Feversham. He had held the seat since the 1906 general election.

The Conservative candidate, 57-year-old Edmund Turton, was returned unopposed and held the seat until his death at the age of 71, three weeks before the 1929 general election.

This was the only by-election held in the Thirsk & Malton constituency, which was created in 1885 and abolished in 1983. However, at the 2010 general election, the death of a candidate forced the parliamentary election in the current Thirsk & Malton constituency to be delayed, so that it was held three weeks later than in every other constituency.

== See also ==
- The town of Thirsk
- List of United Kingdom by-elections
