= Harold Jackson (VC) =

Recipient of the Victoria Cross

- Born: 31 May 1892; Kirton, Lincolnshire, England
- Died: 24 August 1918 (aged 26); Thiepval, France
- Burial place: AIF Burial Ground, Flers, France
- Military career
- Allegiance: United Kingdom
- Branch: British Army
- Service years: 1915−1918
- Rank: Sergeant
- Service number: 18474
- Units: 18th Hussars; East Yorkshire Regiment
- Conflicts: First World War: Capture of Fricourt; Battle of Bazentin Ridge; German spring offensive
- Awards: Victoria Cross

Sergeant Harold Jackson VC (31 May 1892 − 24 August 1918) was a British Army soldier and an English recipient of the Victoria Cross (VC), the highest and most prestigious award for gallantry in the face of the enemy that can be awarded to British and Commonwealth forces. A soldier with the East Yorkshire Regiment, he was awarded the VC for his actions in March 1918, during the German spring offensive of the First World War. He was killed in action five months later.

== Early life ==
Jackson was born on 31 May 1892 to Thomas and Ann Jackson, and lived in Allandales, Kirton, in the English county of Lincolnshire. After working as a drayman, he moved to Nottingham in about 1912 or 1913 and worked on the railways there. He later started working as a bricklayer for a building company.

== First World War ==
Jackson joined the British Army in April 1915, eight months after the British entry into World War I, and was posted to the 18th Hussars (later the 18th Royal Hussars), a cavalry regiment. As a trooper, he was dispatched to France for service on the Western Front. After a few months he was transferred to the East Yorkshire Regiment, a line infantry regiment, and assigned to the 7th (Service) Battalion of his new regiment, a recently raised Kitchener's Army unit made up of civilian volunteers. He participated in the capture of Fricourt, on the opening day of the Battle of the Somme on 1 July 1916, and was wounded two weeks later during the Battle of Bazentin Ridge. Repatriated to England for medical treatment and on recovery served with a reserve battalion before rejoining the 7th East Yorkshires in 1917.

During the German spring offensive of 1918, Jackson's battalion were tasked with the defence of Hermies. On 22 March, Jackson, now a sergeant, volunteered for an intelligence gathering patrol, which had to be conducted while the Germans laid down an artillery barrage. Later the same day, he was heavily involved in fighting off a German attack that initially penetrated his battalion's position and then put a machine-gun post out of action. Over the following days, the regiment conducted a fighting retreat. Near Albert, on 31 March, he took command of his company after all the officers had been killed or wounded and even retrieved wounded men while under fire. For his actions over the period 22 to 31 March 1918, he was awarded the Victoria Cross (VC). The VC, instituted in 1856, was the highest award for valour that could be bestowed on a soldier of the British Empire.

The citation for his VC read as follows:

For most conspicuous bravery and devotion to duty. Sjt. Jackson volunteered and went out through the hostile barrage and brought back valuable information regarding the enemy's movements. Later, when the enemy had established themselves in our line, this N.C.O. rushed at them, and single-handed, bombed them out into the open. Shortly afterwards, again single-handed, he stalked an enemy machine-gun, threw Mills bombs at the detachment, and put the gun out of action. On a subsequent occasion when all his officers had become casualties, this very gallant N.C.O. led his company in the attack, and, when ordered to retire, he withdrew the company successfully under heavy fire. He then went out repeatedly under heavy fire and carried in wounded.

— The London Gazette, 7 May 1918

Jackson received his VC ribbon from Lieutenant General Cameron Shute, commander of V Corps, on 18 May. He returned to England to be presented with the VC medal itself from King George V; this ceremony took place at Buckingham Palace on 26 June. He "returned home to Kirton, to a hero's welcome and Kirton Brass Band took part in the ceremonies along with most of the town's inhabitants". Jackson's response to this was to thank the townspeople for their "grand and hearty reception".

After a period of leave, he returned to his battalion, which "in the last ten days of March had lost twenty-one officers and 431 men", and was still serving on the Western Front. Jackson's "luck ran out" on 24 August when he was killed in action at Thiepval, France. Originally buried near where he was killed, in 1927 his remains were relocated to the AIF Burial Ground at Flers. "The village of Flers came into prominence in mid-September 1916 when it was captured by British and New Zealanders who had the use of tanks for the first time. The village was lost in March 1918 and retaken by the British in August". He is commemorated on several memorials; that in his home town, one in Boston and at Wood Green in London.

== The medal ==
Jackson's medals also included the 1914–15 Star, British War Medal, and the Victory Medal. His sister, Mary Searby, had possession of his VC and later lent it to her father, Thomas Jackson, for a function at Buckingham Palace. The VC remained with him until his death, at which time it was returned to Searby. It was later passed onto her niece in the mid-1950s. It, along with Jackson's other medals, was sold to a private collector in May 1989.

== Bibliography ==
- Ashcroft, Michael (2007) [2006]. Victoria Cross Heroes. London: Headline Review. ISBN 978-0-7553-1633-5.
- Buzzell, Nora, ed. (1997). The Register of the Victoria Cross. Cheltenham, Gloucestershire: This England Alma House. ISBN 0-906324-27-0.
- Gliddon, Gerald (2013) [2004]. Spring Offensive 1918. VCs of the First World War. Stroud, Gloucestershire: The History Press. ISBN 978-0-7524-8730-4.
