= Bill Michie =

British Labour politician

Member of Parliament for Sheffield Heeley
- In office 9 June 1983 – 14 May 2001
- Preceded by: Frank Hooley
- Succeeded by: Meg Munn

Personal details
- Born: 24 November 1935
- Died: 22 September 2017 (aged 81) Sheffield
- Party: Labour

William Michie (24 November 1935 – 22 September 2017) was a British politician.

Michie was the Labour Member of Parliament for Sheffield Heeley from 1983 to 2001. He was a member of the Socialist Campaign Group of MPs and the Parliamentary Humanist Group. After his death, the BBC described him as "a stalwart of Sheffield politics".

== Early life ==
Michie was born in Sheffield to Arthur Michie, a turner, and his wife, Violet. He was educated at the city's Abbeydale secondary school and Sheffield Polytechnic.

== Career ==
Michie worked as a maintenance electrician and laboratory technician until he was made redundant in 1981 and was then unemployed until he entered parliament in 1983. He was "a life-long member" of the AEU.

He joined the Labour Party in 1965, and in 1970 he was elected to Sheffield City Council, serving on the council until 1984 with spells as chairman of its planning (1974-1981) and employment (1981-1983) committees. He was also Labour's chief whip and group secretary on the council for nine years.

From 1974 until 1986, the duration of its existence, he also served on South Yorkshire County Council, chairing its area planning committee from 1974 until 1981.

In her obituary of Michie, Julia Langdon noted that he was "among an energetic group of young Labour activists who emerged in Sheffield in the 1970s" when the area was part of what was labeled “The People's Republic of South Yorkshire". Originally intended as a criticism of the radical politics pursued by Labour in the region, it came to be embraced by Michie and others. Elected the same day as Michie was future Labour cabinet member David Blunkett. Michie himself would personally raise the red flag above Sheffield Town Hall.

Michie was elected to parliament for Sheffield Heeley at the 1983 general election, significantly bettering the result of his Labour predecessor in an election when his party struggled nationally. In 1985 he became vice-chairman of the Yorkshire group of Labour MPs and, in 1987, became treasurer of the Campaign Group.

According to the obituary of Michie in The Yorkshire Post, opponents in the Conservatives called him "Labour's most Left-wing politician" during his time as an MP. Fellow Labour MP Richard Caborn, who considered Michie, a "very dear friend," said he was always associated with the left of the Labour Party and "always on the side of the minorities".

== Personal life ==
Michie was married twice. His first marriage, which produced two sons, ended in divorce in 1982. He married his second wife, Judith, in 1987, and the marriage lasted until she died in 2016. He was a supporter of Sheffield Wednesday.

== Sources ==
- Leigh Rayment's Historical List of MPs
- Hansard 1803–2005: contributions in Parliament by Bill Michie

Parliament of the United Kingdom
Preceded by Frank Hooley	Member of Parliament for Sheffield Heeley; 1983–2001	Succeeded by Meg Munn
