= Sir Edmund Turton, 1st Baronet =

British politician

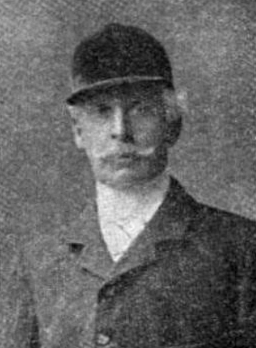

Member of Parliament
- In office 1915–1929
- Constituency: Thirsk & Malton division

Personal details
- Born: Edmund Russborough Turton; 1 November 1857
- Died: 9 May 1929 (aged 71) Upsall, North Yorkshire, England
- Party: Conservative
- Spouse: Clementina Ponsonby-Fane (m. 1888)
- Education: Eton College; Brasenose College, Oxford

Sir Edmund Russborough Turton, 1st Baronet, JP, DL (1 November 1857 – 9 May 1929) was a British Conservative Party politician.

== Life ==
He was born on 1 November 1857, the eldest child of Edmund Henry Turton of the 3rd Dragoon Guards and his wife Lady Cecilia Mary Leeson, 2nd daughter of Joseph Leeson, 4th Earl of Milltown. He was educated at Eton College, and matriculated at Brasenose College, Oxford in 1876. He was called to the bar at the Inner Temple in 1882.

Turton was an unsuccessful candidate in the Richmond division of the North Riding of Yorkshire at the 1892 and 1895 elections. He finally entered the House of Commons twenty years later, in 1915, when he was elected as the Member of Parliament (MP) for the Thirsk & Malton division. His predecessor had inherited a peerage, and Turton was returned unopposed at the resulting by-election.

He was appointed Chairman of the North Riding Quarter Sessions in 1898, a position that he held until at least 1926. He was a Member of the Speaker's Conference on Electoral Reform 1916–17; the Royal Commission on London Government, 1921–23; and of the Royal Commission on Local Government, 1923–25.

He held the seat until his death at the age of 71, three weeks before the 1929 general election, when a relative, Robin Turton, was elected to succeed him.

== Family ==
Escutcheon of Turton of Upsall

Turton married in 1888 Clementina, daughter of Spencer Ponsonby-Fane. They had one son, who joined the Yorkshire Hussars and was killed in action in 1915.

In 1926, Turton was created a baronet, of Upsall in the County of York.

He died at Upsall Castle on 9 May 1929. He left no heir. The title became extinct on his death.

Parliament of the United Kingdom
Preceded by Viscount Helmsley	Member of Parliament for Thirsk & Malton; 1915 – 1929	Succeeded by Robin Turton
Baronetage of the United Kingdom
New creation	Baronet (of Upsall); 1926–1929	Extinct
