= AIF Burial Ground Commonwealth War Graves Commission Cemetery =

WWI CWGC cemetery in Somme, France

AIF Burial Ground
- Commonwealth War Graves Commission
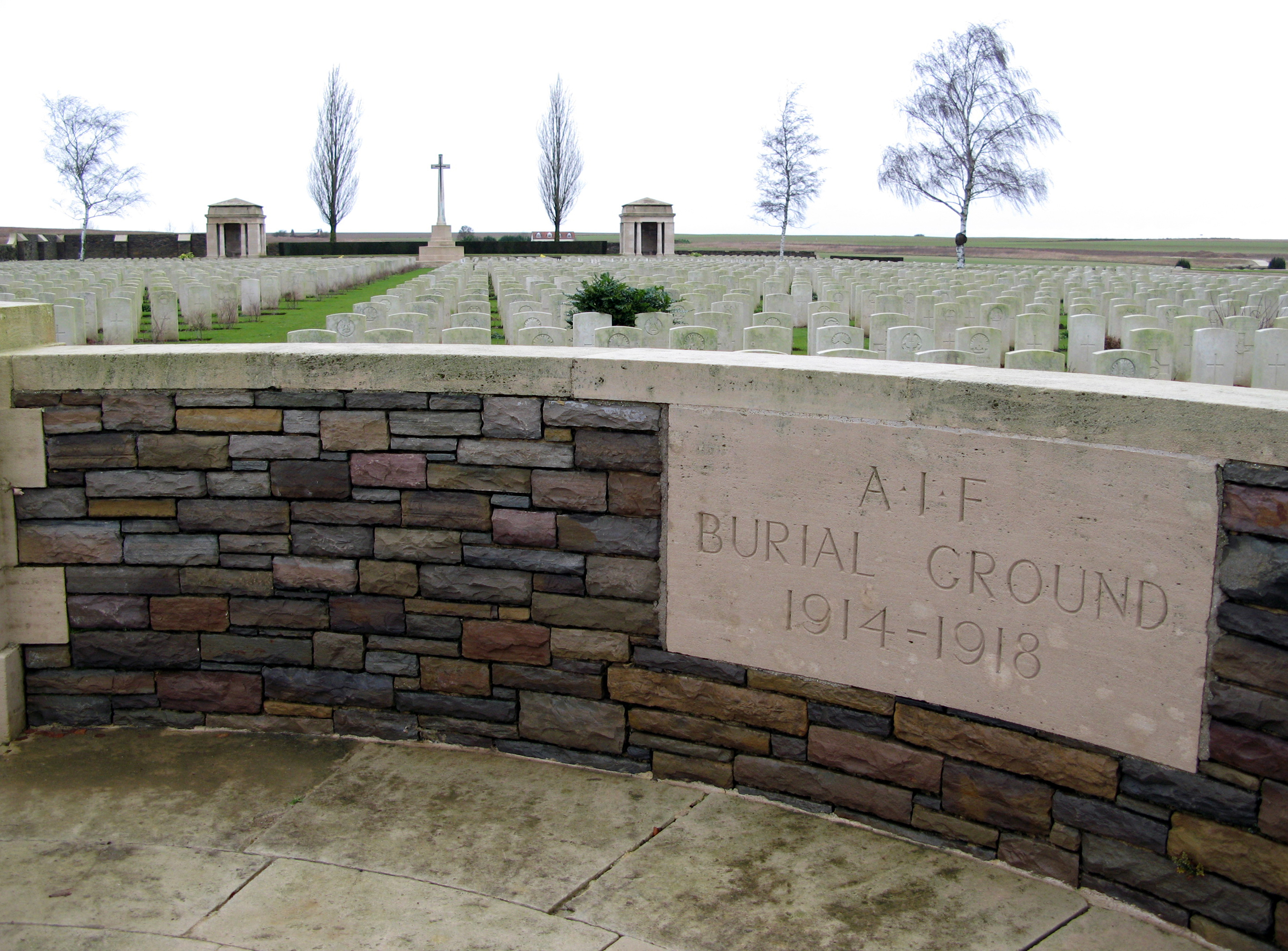
- Used for those deceased 1914–1918
- Established: Postwar
- Location: 50°03′36″N 2°49′50″E near Flers, France
- Total burials: 3,475
- Unknowns: 2,263

Burials by nation
- Allied Powers: United Kingdom: 856; Australia: 275; France: 170; New Zealand: 54; Canada: 29; Germany: 3

Burials by war
- First World War: 3,475

AIF Burial Ground is a Commonwealth War Graves Commission burial ground for the dead of the First World War located near Flers on the Somme in France.

== History ==
The village of Flers, on the Somme, has been the scene of several battles during the First World War. It was originally captured by the Germans during their advance into France in 1914. It was seized by the British 41st Division and the New Zealand Division on 15 September 1916 during the Battle of Flers–Courcelette. It was lost in March 1918 during the German spring offensive but returned to Allied hands later that year in the Hundred Days Offensive.

== Foundation ==
The AIF Burial Ground was established during the First World War, towards the end of 1916, when Australian medical personnel began burying casualties from medical stations nearby. After the war, the cemetery was significantly expanded as several smaller cemeteries in the area were consolidated. These included the Factory Corner and North Road cemeteries.

== Cemetery ==
The cemetery, designed by the English architect Herbert Baker and located two kilometres to the north of Flers on the D74, holds the remains of 3,475 Allied soldiers, with over half of them unknown. There are also three German graves. Within the cemetery are special memorials to several soldiers who are believed to be among the unknown remains buried at the cemetery. In addition, there are further memorials to three soldiers buried in Flers cemetery whose graves could not be identified. At the far end of the cemetery is a Cross of Sacrifice.

The original interments, which took place in November 1916, are located in the southeast corner of the cemetery. Most graves are of those who died in late 1916 or early 1917, with others dating from March to April 1918 and then August to September 1918. One interment is of a casualty from 1914. Among the interments at the AIF Burial Ground is Sergeant Harold Jackson, a recipient of the Victoria Cross, who was killed in action near Thiepval on 24 August 1918. His remains were relocated here in 1927 during the consolidation of the various cemeteries in the area.

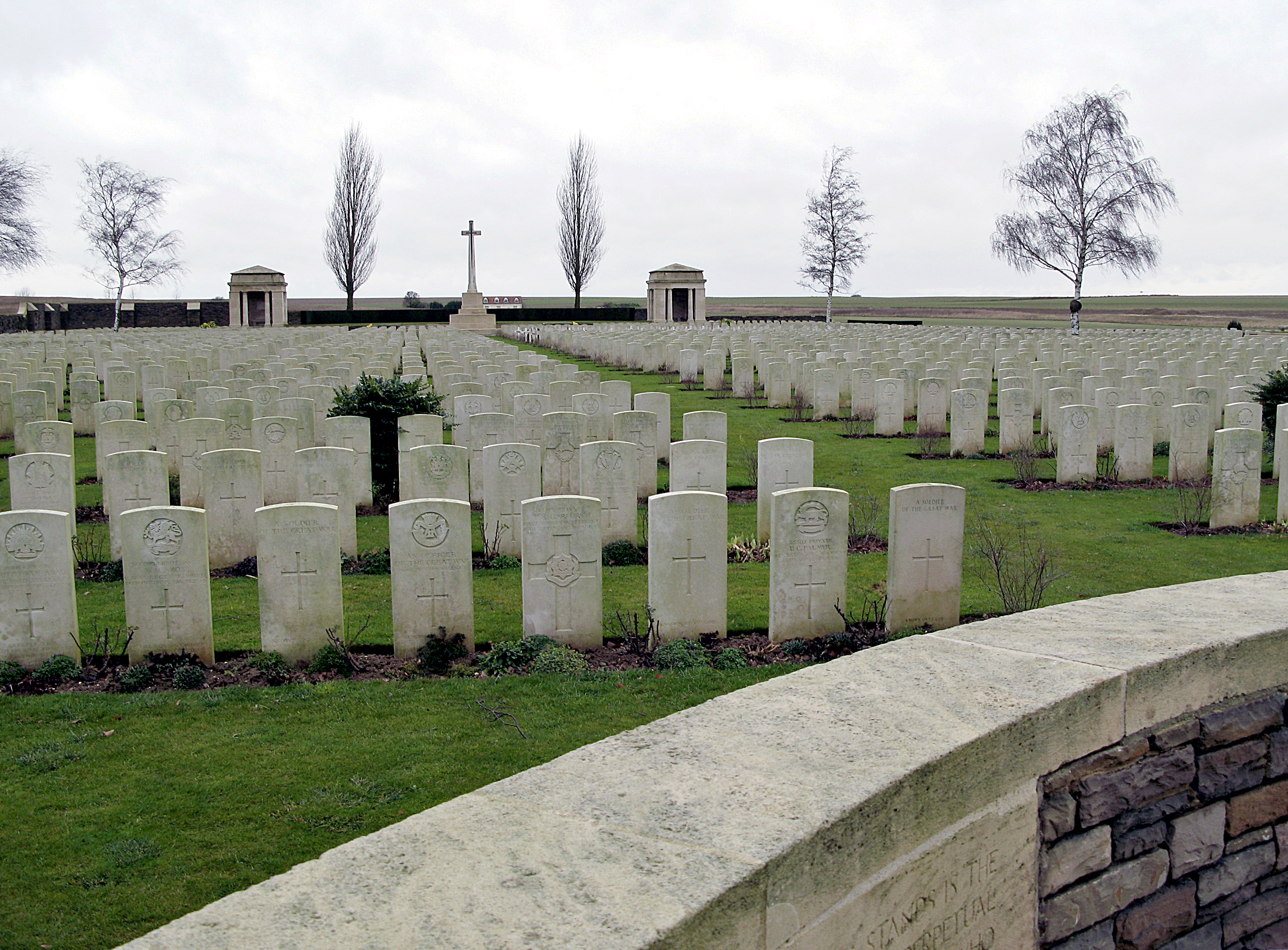
The AIF Burial Ground Cemetery
