= John Spence (politician) =

British politician (1920–1986)

- John Spence on the cover of his 1966 election leaflet

Member of Parliament for Ryedale
- In office 9 June 1983 – 4 March 1986
- Preceded by: New Constituency
- Succeeded by: Elizabeth Shields

Member of Parliament for Thirsk and Malton
- In office 28 February 1974 – 9 June 1983
- Preceded by: Robin Turton
- Succeeded by: Constituency Abolished

Member of Parliament for Sheffield Heeley
- In office 18 June 1970 – 28 February 1974
- Preceded by: Frank Hooley
- Succeeded by: Frank Hooley

Personal details
- Born: 7 December 1920
- Died: 4 March 1986 (aged 65) York, England

John Deane Spence (7 December 1920 – 4 March 1986) was a British Conservative Party politician.

Spence was educated at Queen's University, Belfast and worked as a building and civil engineering contractor, merchant banker and farmer. In 1944, he married Hester Nicholson, and they had two children.

Spence contested Wakefield in 1964, and Sheffield Heeley in 1966. He was Member of Parliament for Sheffield Heeley from 1970 to 1974, Thirsk and Malton from 1974 to 1983, and Ryedale from 1983 until he died at York Hospital on 4 March 1986. He was a member of the Speaker's panel of chairmen.

Parliament of the United Kingdom
Preceded by Frank Hooley	Member of Parliament for Sheffield Heeley; 1970–February 1974	Succeeded by Frank Hooley
Preceded by Robin Turton	Member of Parliament for Thirsk and Malton; February 1974–1983	Constituency abolished
New constituency	Member of Parliament for Ryedale; 1983–1986	Succeeded by Elizabeth Shields
