= Smith Institute =

UK think tank

The Smith Institute is a left-wing think tank in the United Kingdom. It was founded in memory of John Smith QC MP, former leader of the Labour Party.

== History ==
Its work has focused on regional "rebalancing" away from London towards the North, health, housing, community cohesion, employment and pay, and early intervention. It was founded in 1996 in memory of John Smith MP who was leader of the Labour Party until his death in 1994. The Smith Institute describes its purpose as pursuing "policies for a fairer society" and states that it aims to build on John Smith's passion for social justice.

The Institute's director is Paul Hackett, a former special adviser to John Prescott MP. It has had articles in the Observer on the regional divide. Its work with the Centre for Social Justice on early intervention has been widely covered.

While the Labour Party was in government, a number of the think tank's meetings were held at Number 11 Downing Street, and the organisation allegedly had close ties with Gordon Brown. Following a complaint from the right-wing media in 2001, the Smith Institute was the subject of an inquiry by the Charity Commission, which closed in 2002.

Ed Balls MP was given a Senior Research Fellowship at the Institute after he left HM Treasury to stand as a Parliamentary candidate in 2004.

== Funding ==
In November 2022, the funding transparency website Who Funds You? gave the institute a D grade (rating goes from A to E).

== See also ==
- List of think tanks in the United Kingdom
