= John Greenway (British politician) =

British politician (born 1946)

John Greenway MP

Member of Parliament for Ryedale
- In office 11 June 1987 – 12 April 2010
- Preceded by: Elizabeth Shields
- Succeeded by: Constituency abolished

Personal details
- Born: 15 February 1946 (age 80) Northwich, Cheshire, England
- Party: Conservative
- Spouse: Sylvia Ann Gant

John Robert Greenway (born 15 February 1946) is a former British politician who sat as the Conservative Member of Parliament (MP) for Ryedale from 1987 until the constituency's abolition in 2010.

== Early life ==
John Greenway was born in Northwich, Cheshire and was educated locally at the Sir John Deane's Grammar School and The College of Law, London. He joined Midland Bank in 1964 before joining the Metropolitan Police Service in 1965, after his Hendon Police College training he worked in the West End of London, leaving the force in 1969 to sell life insurance for Equitable Life. He joined National Provident in 1970, before setting up his own insurance and finance company in 1971. He was a financial journalist at Post Magazine (Post Weekly), and still writes for financial publications.

== Parliamentary career ==
He was the treasurer of the Ryedale Conservative Association for two years from 1984 and was elected to the North Yorkshire County Council in 1985 for two years. He was the vice-chairman of the North Yorkshire Police 1986–7. He was elected to the House of Commons at the 1987 general election, when he regained the seat for the Conservatives from the Liberal MP Elizabeth Shields who won the seat at the 1986 Ryedale by-election. Greenway won the seat with a majority of 9,740 and remained the MP until the seat's abolition for the 2010 general election.

He served in parliament as a member of the home affairs select committee 1987–97, and was appointed as the Parliamentary Private Secretary to the Minister of State at the Ministry of Agriculture, Fisheries and Food Jean Trumpington for a year from 1991. He was promoted to the frontbench by William Hague in 1997 as a spokesman on home affairs, before being moved in 2000 as a spokesman for culture, media and sport where he remained throughout the leadership of Iain Duncan Smith until he was sacked by Michael Howard in 2003. He was briefly a member of the education and skills select committee in 2005 before the general election. He was the chairman of the all party opera group. He introduced the Bill for the Ragwort Control Act 2003.

He maintained a strong interest in the financial services sector and chaired the All-Party Parliamentary Group on Insurance and Financial Services.

In boundary changes agreed in 2006, Greenway's constituency was enlarged and renamed Thirsk and Malton, taking in a large part of the divided Vale of York constituency. Unexpectedly on 18 November 2006, the Thirsk and Malton Conservative Association selected Anne McIntosh (sitting MP for Vale of York) over Greenway as their candidate for the next general election.

He was criticised in some quarters for his poor attendance record in the House of Commons. According to the theyworkforyou website, he attended only half of Parliamentary votes, and contributed to very few debates. In the scandal concerning MP's expenses it was alleged Mr. Greenway claimed £500 for petunias and fuchsia for his London flat.

== Personal life ==
He was married to Sylvia Ann Gant in 1974. They have two sons and a daughter. He now lives in Chiswick with divorcee Hanneke Dannhorn (born 1953), mother of Emily and Mark Dannhorn, and managing director of the Brook Green UK travel group, since 2004.

A horse racing enthusiast, he won an animal welfare award in 2003, and is the president of York City F.C. As a former police officer he has called for the death penalty for police murders, specifically mentioning Winston Silcott, after narrowly avoiding being shot. Greenway fought for an amendment to the Criminal Justice Act 1991 to provide for capital punishment for the murder of a police officer. He later tried to sponsor a similar bill commanding that "A person aged 18 years or above who is convicted of the murder of a police officer acting in the execution of his duty shall on conviction be sentenced to death." Both attempts were soundly defeated.

Parliament of the United Kingdom
Preceded by Elizabeth Shields	Member of Parliament for Ryedale; 1987 – 2010	Constituency abolished see Thirsk & Malton
