= Elizabeth Shields =

British politician (born 1928)

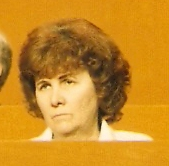
- Shields at the 1987 Liberal Party Assembly

Member of Parliament for Ryedale
- In office 8 May 1986 – 11 June 1987
- Preceded by: John Spence
- Succeeded by: John Greenway
- Majority: 4,940

Member of Ryedale District Council
- In office 1980–2019
- Ward: Norton; Norton East

Personal details
- Born: Elizabeth Lois Teare; 27 February 1928 (age 98)
- Party: Liberal Democrats (since 1988)
- Other political affiliations: Liberal (before 1988)
- Education: University of York

Elizabeth Lois Shields (née Teare; born 27 February 1928) is a British former politician. Since the death of Sir Patrick Duffy in 2026, Shields has been Britain's oldest surviving former MP.

== Biography ==
Shields studied at the University of York and became a teacher and lecturer. She served as a councillor on Ryedale District Council from 1980 to 2019 for Norton (later Norton East).

Shields contested Howden in 1979 and Ryedale in 1983. Following the death of Ryedale's Conservative MP John Spence in 1986, Shields achieved victory in the Ryedale by-election of 1986, becoming the constituency's first Liberal MP, as part of the Alliance electoral pact between the Liberals and the Social Democrats. However, it was a short-lived success, as the Conservative John Greenway regained Ryedale at the 1987 general election. Shields stood for Ryedale again in 1992, this time for the Liberal Democrats, who were the successors to the Liberal Party. The Conservatives, however, increased their majority.

After previously serving as the Group Leader of the Liberal Democrats on the District Council, Shields lost her seat to the Conservatives in the 2019 local elections. During 1989–1990 she held the office of Chairman of the District Council.

Parliament of the United Kingdom
Preceded by John Spence	Member of Parliament for Ryedale; 1986–1987	Succeeded by John Greenway
