= Geoffrey Howe's resignation speech =

UK Deputy Prime Minister's speech, 13 November 1990

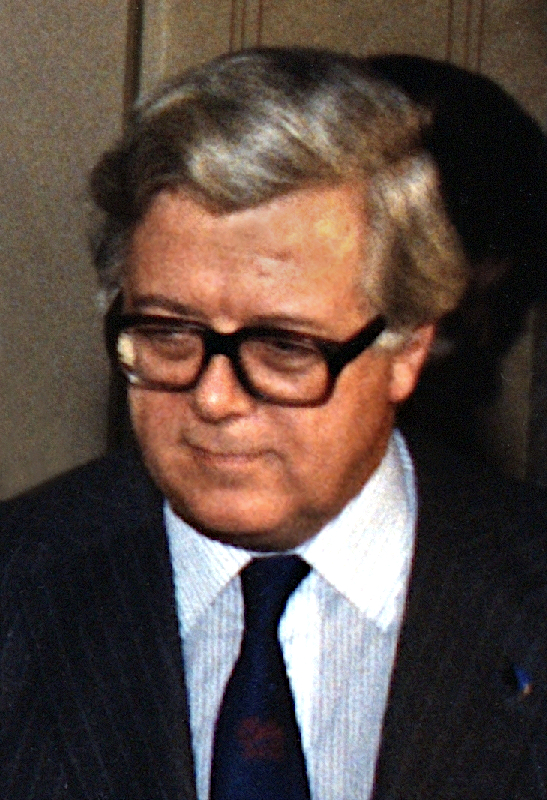
- Geoffrey Howe in 1985
- Date: 13 November 1990
- Time: 4:19 pm (Greenwich Mean Time, UTC+00:00)
- Duration: 18 minutes
- Venue: House of Commons, London, United Kingdom
- Location: London, United Kingdom
- Cause: Resignation, Margaret Thatcher's rejection of the European Economic Community's plans for further integration
- Participants: Geoffrey Howe

On 13 November 1990, Deputy Prime Minister of the United Kingdom Sir Geoffrey Howe delivered his resignation speech in the House of Commons after resigning on 1 November. While Howe initially worded carefully his resignation letter and criticism of the Prime Minister's overall handling of United Kingdom relations with the European Community, 10 Downing Street claimed that his disagreement with Thatcher on Europe were differences only in style, rather than substance. These attempts were largely successful and Howe decided to send a powerful message of dissent.

In his speech, he attacked Thatcher for running increasingly serious risks for the country's future and criticised her for undermining the policies on EMU proposed by her chancellor and governor of the Bank of England. Although Howe's intention was only to constrain any shift in European policy by the Cabinet under the existing prime minister, his speech is widely seen as the key catalyst for the leadership challenge mounted by Michael Heseltine a few days later. Although Thatcher won the most votes in the leadership election, she did not win by a large enough margin to win outright. Subsequently, she withdrew from the contest on 22 November, and five days later John Major was elected party leader, becoming prime minister.

== Background ==
On 30 October 1990, Margaret Thatcher spoke out firmly in the House of Commons against the vision of European integration, including a single currency, espoused by the European Commission under Jacques Delors at the recent Rome Summit, characterising it as the path to a federal Europe and declaring that her response to such a vision would be "No! No! No!". This led to the resignation of Howe as deputy prime minister on 1 November. However, Howe did not make his resignation speech immediately, because he had temporarily lost his voice. Although he was sometimes mocked as "Mogadon man" – Mogadon being a well-known sleeping medication – his dispute with Thatcher was over matters of substance more than ones of style; he advocated a move back towards a more centrist position on constitutional and administrative issues, such as taxation and European integration. Howe represented a moderate position in the party, being educated, lawyerly, and diligent; while direct, he was conciliatory and collegial in style. In his resignation letter, Howe cautiously worded his criticism of the Prime Minister's overall handling of United Kingdom relations with the European Community.

Michael Heseltine, a moderate and pro-EU former minister, had resigned from the Cabinet over the Westland affair in January 1986 and had been conducting himself as a sort of intra-party opposition leader, critical of Thatcher's leadership, ever since. He now wrote a six-page public letter to his local Association chairman, calling for more regard for the wide range of opinions in the party before leaving for a trip to the Middle East. His Association officers sent him a 97-word reply on 5 November saying that they supported Thatcher's leadership. The party's regional agent had been present at their meeting, although they insisted he had not interfered with their reply. At about the same time, Thatcher's press secretary Bernard Ingham briefed journalists that Heseltine had "lit the blue touch paper then retired", although he denied having demanded that Heseltine "put up (that is, challenge Thatcher for the leadership) or shut up"; Heseltine was also taunted along similar lines by right-wing press, including the Daily Mail and The Times. Thatcher brought the annual leadership election forward by a fortnight.

At the Lord Mayor's Banquet on 12 November, Thatcher dismissed Howe's resignation by employing a cricketing metaphor:

I am still at the crease, though the bowling has been pretty hostile of late. And in case anyone doubted it, can I assure you there will be no ducking the bouncers, no stonewalling, no playing for time. The bowling's going to get hit all round the ground. That is my style.

== Speech ==
Following largely successful attempts by 10 Downing Street to claim that there were differences only in style, rather than substance, in Howe's disagreement with Thatcher on Europe, Howe chose to send a powerful message of dissent, making his resignation speech in the House of Commons the following day on 13 November. In his speech, he attacked Thatcher for running increasingly serious risks for the country's future and criticised her for undermining the policies on EMU proposed by her chancellor and governor of the Bank of England. Howe responded to her recent cricketing metaphor by employing one written by his wife Elspeth, an avid cricket fan herself, after watching Thatcher on the news the night before. Explaining how, in his opinion, her approach made it hard for British ministers to negotiate for Britain's interests in Europe, he declared:

It is rather like sending your opening batsmen to the crease only for them to find, the moment the first balls are bowled, that their bats have been broken before the game by the team captain.

He ended his speech with an appeal to cabinet colleagues: "The time has come for others to consider their own response to the tragic conflict of loyalties, with which I have myself wrestled for perhaps too long."

== Impact ==
Howe's dramatic speech received cheers from the opposition benches and reinforced the change in general perception of Thatcher from the "Iron Lady" to a divisive and confrontational figure. The next morning, 14 November, Heseltine reappeared to announce that he would challenge her for the leadership of the party.

Although Howe subsequently wrote in his memoir Conflict of Loyalty that his intention was only to constrain any shift in European policy by the Cabinet under the existing prime minister, his speech is widely seen as the key catalyst for the leadership challenge mounted by Michael Heseltine a few days later. Although Thatcher won the most votes in the leadership election, she did not win by a large enough margin to win outright. Subsequently, she withdrew from the contest on 22 November. Five days later, Chancellor of the Exchequer John Major was elected party leader and thus became prime minister. The change proved to be a positive one for the Tories, who had trailed Labour in most opinion polls by a double-digit margin throughout 1990 but soon returned to the top of the polls and won the general election in April 1992.

== In popular media ==
Howe's dramatic resignation speech in the House of Commons formed the basis of Jonathan Maitland's 2015 play Dead Sheep, and it was enacted by Paul Jesson in season four of the 2020 Netflix series The Crown.

== See also ==
- No. No. No. (Margaret Thatcher)
