= Margaret (2009 film) =

2009 British television film

- Written by: Richard Cottan
- Directed by: James Kent
- Starring: Lindsay Duncan; James Fox; Robert Hardy
- Country of origin: United Kingdom
- Original language: English

Production
- Producer: Sanne Wohlenberg
- Running time: 113 minutes

Original release
- Network: BBC Two
- Release: 26 February 2009

Related
- The Long Walk to Finchley

Margaret is a 2009 television film produced by Great Meadow Productions for the BBC. It was first broadcast on 26 February 2009 on BBC Two. It was made by the same production company as the 2008 television film The Long Walk to Finchley, which fictionalised the start of Thatcher's political career.

== Plot ==
Margaret is a fictionalisation of the life of Margaret Thatcher (played by Lindsay Duncan) and her fall from the premiership in the 1990 leadership election, with flashbacks telling the story of Thatcher's defeat of Edward Heath in the 1975 leadership election.

== Production ==
On 9 April 2008, it was announced that Duncan was to play Thatcher, and filming commenced in the summer of that year.

== Cast ==
- Lindsay Duncan – Margaret Thatcher, Prime Minister
- Ian McDiarmid – Denis Thatcher, Prime Minister's Spouse
- Robert Hardy – Willie Whitelaw, Former Deputy Prime Minister and Home Secretary
- James Fox – Charles Powell, Prime Minister's Foreign Policy Advisor and Private Secretary
- Rupert Vansittart – Peter Morrison, Prime Minister's Parliamentary Private Secretary
- Alan Cox – Gordon Reece, Prime Minister's Media Advisor
- Christian McKay – John Whittingdale, Prime Minister's Political Secretary
- Oliver Le Sueur – Mark Thatcher, Prime Minister's Son
- Olivia Poulet – Carol Thatcher, Prime Minister's Daughter
- Kevin McNally – Kenneth Clarke, Education Secretary
- Roy Marsden – Norman Tebbit, former cabinet minister
- Nicholas Rowe – Malcolm Rifkind, Scotland Secretary
- Michael Maloney – John Major, Chancellor of the Exchequer
- Roger Allam – John Wakeham, Energy Secretary (Allam would go on to have a role in The Iron Lady, a big screen portrayal of Thatcher's terms in office)
- Nicholas Jones – Tim Renton, Chief Whip (Jones is also in The Iron Lady, as Admiral Henry Leach)
- Tim McMullan – William Waldegrave, Foreign Office Minister
- Nicholas Le Prevost – Douglas Hurd, Foreign Secretary
- Michael Cochrane – Alan Clark, Defence Minister and Thatcher Supporter (Cochrane would also go on to have a role in The Iron Lady)
- John Sessions – Geoffrey Howe, Deputy Prime Minister and Leader of the House of Commons (Sessions would also go on to have a role in The Iron Lady)
- Philip Jackson – Bernard Ingham, Prime Minister's Press Secretary
- Roger Ashton-Griffiths – John Sergeant, ITV Reporter
- Oliver Cotton – Michael Heseltine, Former Defence Secretary
- Guy Henry – Tristan Garel-Jones, Government Whip
- Diana Kent – Margaret King
- Elizabeth Bennett – Sue Mastriforte
- Julian Firth – Norman Lamont, Chief Secretary to the Treasury
- Rosemary Leach – Queen Elizabeth II
- Douglas McFerran – MP2
- Nigel Le Vaillant – Edward Heath, Former Conservative Leader and Prime Minister
- Dermot Crowley – Airey Neave, Thatcher Campaign Manager in 1975
- Ian Hughes – John Gummer
- Nicholas Day – Cranley Onslow
- Paul Jesson – Kenneth Baker
- Charlotte Asprey – Caroline Stephens, Thatcher's secretary, wife of Lord Ryder of Wensum
- Jenny Howe – Cynthia Crawford
- Tim Wallers – MP1
- Martin Chamberlain – Nigel Lawson
- Mark Perry – John MacGregor
- George Pensotti – Speaker of the House of Commons
- Francis Maguire – Official

Hardy, Fox, Vansittart and Cochrane had all appeared in the 2002 TV production of The Falklands Play, by Ian Curteis, about an earlier period in Thatcher's premiership; although many political figures were featured in both films, none of the four actors played the same roles in both.

Allam, Cochrane, Jones and Sessions would go on to appear in the 2011 film The Iron Lady about Thatcher's rise to power, relationship with her husband, and life after politics.

== Reception ==
The Guardian critic praised the "deft casting" and stated that the flashbacks were "illuminating and sometimes entertaining" and that some episodes in the drama were "wholly imaginary and thoroughly un-Thatcherite, but ... [hang] around the mind like cigar smoke".

== Media releases ==
It is currently available for purchase in the UK.

== See also ==
- Thatcher: The Final Days, a 1991 film also depicting the final days of Thatcher's premiership
- The Iron Lady, a 2011 film about Thatcher
- Cultural depictions of Margaret Thatcher
