= Crawfie =

Crawfie is a nickname for someone with the surname Crawford. Notable people with the nickname include:

- Marion Crawford (1909–1988), Scottish educator and governess to Princesses Elizabeth and Margaret
- Cynthia Crawford, personal assistant to Margaret Thatcher
