= Send Him Victorious =

First edition (publ. Collins)

Send Him Victorious is a political thriller novel by Andrew Osmond, a former officer of Gurkha troops and diplomat, and Douglas Hurd, a former diplomat who later became an MP and Cabinet minister. It was published in 1968.

== Background ==
The book was the first in a trilogy, the other two titles being The Smile on the Face of the Tiger and Scotch on the Rocks. It looks ahead from 1968 and into the future, in a time when Queen Elizabeth II is no longer the monarch of the United Kingdom and has been succeeded by a King (presumably the former Prince Charles). The former colony of Rhodesia is still defying international demands for black majority rule and is supported by apartheid-era South Africa.

== Plot ==
A moderate Conservative government in the United Kingdom is preparing to use force to overthrow the white minority government of Rhodesia. There are widespread extreme right-wing protests in Britain against this policy. Agitators in the Grenadier Guards incite a mutiny, in which the hated Regimental Sergeant Major is killed. An armed gang breaks into Chelsea Barracks to release the agitators, including by mistake Guardsman Steele, who has been wrongly accused of murdering the RSM. Steele plays along with his captors as they prepare to turn a demonstration in Oxford into an ugly riot. He manages to telephone his mother with a garbled description of the conspirators, before he is found with a fractured skull. Veteran journalist Jack Kemble links his mention of a scarred Frenchman with someone seen meeting the mutinous guardsmen.

The Cabinet, led by Prime Minister Patrick Harvey, resolve to proceed with the use of force against Rhodesia. Secretary of State for Defence Critten and Tory grandee Lord Thorganby resign in protest. The King, who is on holiday in Italy, feels he should return to support the Government. His aircraft is found to have been sabotaged, but a businessman, Dennis Ralston, offers him his private jet. The jet explodes in mid-flight.

In the crisis, the youthful Prince, the heir to the throne, is given what purports to be a statement which the King intended to broadcast to the nation. Behind the scenes, Sir James Courthope, the late King's private secretary, tells Lord Thorganby that the King intended to sack Harvey and invite Thorganby to form a government, which would cancel the action against Rhodesia. When the Prince reads the script, it is well-received, but Harvey refuses to believe that the King wrote it.

Thorganby starts to form a government but Alan Selkirk, his Principal Private Secretary, realises that Courthope reported the King's death to the Prince before news of the explosion reached anybody. He writes a letter to Thorganby with this information and his resignation, but he has been overheard by Courthope. Courthope alerts the plotters behind the Guards' mutiny, who murder Selkirk.

In Rome, Kemble, who has been sacked for pursuing the story on the Guards against orders, is taking a holiday, though unable to stop chasing stories. He realises that there is a connection between Ralston and the South African apartheid government. Avoiding an attempt by the scarred Frenchman, Poidatz, to kill him, he breaks open Ralston's sealed trunk in the British embassy in Rome. He expects to find blueprints of a missile Ralston is illegally supplying to South Africa; instead, he finds the King, drugged and unconscious.

Alan Selkirk's murderers were seen leaving his flat, and are arrested trying to leave the country. Thorganby confronts Critten and Courthope at 10 Downing Street with the documents taken from them, including Selkirk's letter. When the news that the King is alive is telephoned to No. 10, Courthope commits suicide by leaping from a window, and Critten must be restrained.

Harvey is reinstated as Prime Minister and launches the operation against Rhodesia in the nick of time. The attempted Coup d'état is determined to have been launched by Ralston, to preserve his business empire, and Critten, who had strong racist views. Courthope, a closet homosexual, was blackmailed into participating. Ralston had kept the King alive should the plot fail and a bargaining chip be required.
