= Scotch on the Rocks =

1973 British television political thriller series

- Created by: Douglas Hurd; Andrew Osmond
- Country of origin: United Kingdom
- Original language: English
- No. of series: 1
- No. of episodes: 5 (2 missing)

Production
- Running time: 40-45 mins
- Production company: BBC Scotland

Original release
- Network: BBC1
- Release: 11 May – 8 June 1973

Scotch on the Rocks is a television serial based on the novel by Douglas Hurd and Andrew Osmond. The book is the third in a loose trilogy, the other two being Send Him Victorious and The Smile on the Face of the Tiger.

Written around 1968, and first published by William Collins in 1971, it was a political thriller, set in Scotland in the near future (early 1970s). It assumed that there would be a political crisis, in which the Scottish National Party would emerge as a serious force. A paramilitary organisation operating on the fringes of the SNP, the Scottish Liberation Army, stages a rising, seizing Fort William.

The BBC adapted it for television in 1973, but has not reaired it since its original transmission due to an upheld complaint that it could mislead viewers about the political views of the SNP.

== Plot ==
In the 1970s United Kingdom, a general election is approaching and the British government fear that the Scottish National Party (SNP) and an underground paramilitary organisation, the Scottish Liberation Army (SLA), will increase their influence. MI5 agent Graham Hart and City of Glasgow Police Detective Superintendent Rennie infiltrate a demolition expert named MacNair into the SLA. Hart is trying to prove that John Mackie, an SNP member of parliament with socialist leanings, is involved with the SLA, while Rennie wishes to arrest Brodie, a vicious criminal who is organising Glasgow youth gangs to support SLA activities. They also hope that MacNair can identify the SLA leader, a shadowy figure named An Ceannard.

The general election takes place, and results in a hung parliament. The SNP also fail to win an absolute majority of the Scottish seats. Mackie's girlfriend Susan ("Sukey") Dunmayne, daughter of a laird, briefs an SLA section in Stirling, consisting mainly of students and commanded by effete lecturer Donald Levi, to act against any deal between Henderson, the moderate leader of the SNP, and the sitting Conservative Prime Minister Patrick Harvey. Their plan to kidnap SNP delegates is reported to the authorities by MacNair. The students are arrested, except one who is armed, and who is shot by soldiers led by a notorious hard-liner, Colonel Cameron. Brodie discovers a paper trail left by Hart's clumsy attempt to establish a cover story for MacNair's past. He, Sukey and Donald Levi kidnap MacNair and take him to a castle in the Highlands where the SLA keep much of their arsenal. Under duress, MacNair uses his expertise to carry out a number of demolitions.

Henderson and Harvey have meanwhile thrashed out a deal at Hexham, making several concessions to Scotland but stopping short of independence. When the SNP meet to ratify the deal, Henderson is surprised that Mackie's militant wing of the party is prepared to support it, in return only for a letter from Henderson, which states that the SNP remains committed to obtaining independence for Scotland by any means. However, at the Conservative Party conference in Blackpool, Mackie deliberately shows this letter to former Conservative Party politician Lord Thorganby. Although semi-retired, Thorganby still has political influence, and when he reads out Mackie's letter in front of the delegates, he thwarts any possibility of the Conservatives ratifying the deal worked out at Hexham. Brodie has kidnapped the ineffectual Secretary of State for Scotland George Scullard as a publicity stunt, but the kidnapping goes wrong and Scullard is drowned. Forced to reverse his policy on Scotland, Harvey appoints Thorganby to be the new Scottish Secretary.

Having belatedly discovered the link between Mackie and Sukey Dunmayne, MI5 send Hart to France to investigate possible links between Sukey and French Communist Party leader Serge Bucholz. Hart is betrayed by French security officials and is shot dead from a passing car. Donald Levi has tried to emigrate to Cuba via France, but has been forced to return to Scotland with a letter from Bucholz for Sukey. MacNair sees him pass the letter to SLA section leader Robert Duguid.

Following Thorganby's appointment and the promise of a hard line being taken with pro-independence agitation, Mackie has decided that the time is right for the SLA to launch an armed insurrection. Thorganby is taken prisoner by Sukey while on a brief walking holiday in the Highlands. The SLA seize Fort William, while several Scottish regiments of the British Army defect to the SLA. Mackie openly joins the insurrection. MacNair prepares the bridge at Ballachulish for demolition, to forestall any counter-attack. Left alone briefly, he stuns Duguid and snatches Bucholz's letter from him. Brodie seriously wounds him with a knife but he breaks free. Brodie blows up the Ballachulish bridge to stop him, causing many SLA casualties.

Thorganby is stunned to discover that Cameron is An Ceannard. Cameron believes that Scotland will become an independent nation only if blood is shed in a war of liberation. He forces Thorganby to walk to English lines in his pyjamas in full view of the press and TV cameras, to ensure maximum humiliation and publicity. The SLA then begin to advance south through Argyll. In London, the Cabinet is prepared to capitulate. Thorganby is especially despondent. However, Brodie, who had been placed under arrest by the SLA for insubordination, has deserted and brought with him Bucholz's letter, which MacNair had dropped. He expects a reward, but Rennie arrests him for the murder of MacNair, whose body has been found under the ruined Ballachulish Bridge.

Prime Minister Harvey uses Bucholz's letter to sway the Cabinet into decisive action. He then reads selected parts of the letter on television, stating that the avowed aim of Bucholz and Mackie was to establish a socialist dictatorship in Scotland. When Cameron hears the broadcast, he forces Mackie to flee, rather than face retribution. The broadcast also induces many recent recruits to desert the SLA, taking advantage of an amnesty announced by Harvey. Henderson has already disavowed the SLA, and he and Harvey negotiate a limited form of independence for Scotland. The SLA tries to retreat into the Western Highlands, but its remnants are defeated and scattered by an air assault. Cameron takes to the hills as a fugitive.

Two months later, an independence ceremony is held in Edinburgh. Thorganby has died of pneumonia, Mackie and Bucholz have fled to the Soviet Union while Sukey Dunmayne, who has been granted an amnesty, has given birth to Mackie's child. Cameron makes a sensational appearance at the ceremony and tries to hoist the Scottish flag. When the flag party tries to arrest him, he commits suicide, stabbing himself with a Sgian-dubh.

== Cast in the television series ==
- Maria Aitken as Sukey Dunmayne
- John Cairney as John Mackie
- Bill Henderson as Robert Duguid
- Madeleine Christie as Mrs. Merrilies
- Clinton Greyn as Colonel Cameron
- Cyril Luckham as Lord Thorganby
- Leonard Maguire as James Henderson
- Maurice Roëves as Brodie
- Bill Simpson as MacNair
- Gerry Slevin as Chief Insp. Rennie
- Peter Cellier as Hart
- Paul Whitsun-Jones as Levi

== Reception ==
Both the novel and the television serial were considered quite controversial at the time of publication and transmission. Gordon Wilson, then leader of the SNP, called for the serial not to be aired. That went ahead, but the SNP submitted a complaint which the BBC's Programmes Complaints Commission partially upheld on the grounds that the use of the SNP's name and branding could mislead viewers into thinking it supported violence. Consequently, the BBC has not reaired the series since its original screening. It was believed for many years that the master tapes had been wiped because of the controversy, but in 2012 the BBC said that they were held in the archives of BBC Scotland. In 2023, the BBC said two of the five episodes were missing from its archives.

In 2010 Alex Salmond, then leader of the SNP, told Douglas Hurd that it was one of his favourite novels and described it as "a cracking read". Mike Russell, then SNP president, said in 2023 that he thought the series had done more good than harm.
