= No. No. No. (speech) =

Quote by Margaret Thatcher

- Statement on the European Council
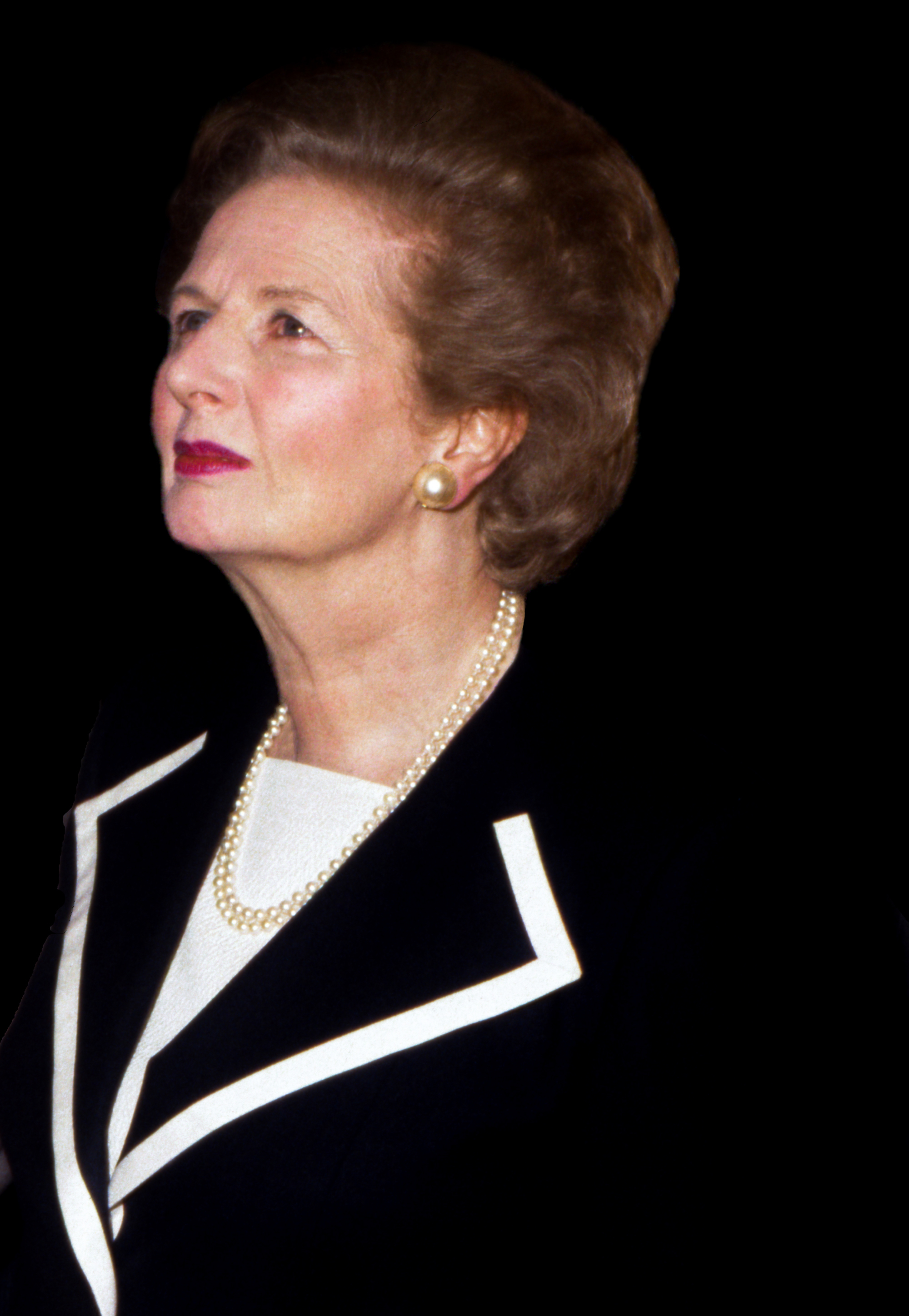
- Margaret Thatcher in 1990
- BBC News clip (30 October 1990)

"No. No. No." was a speech given by British prime minister Margaret Thatcher to the House of Commons in response to European Commission president Jacques Delors's proposals for European integration at the October 1990 European Council summit meeting in Rome. Her remarks led to the resignation of deputy prime minister Geoffrey Howe and the ensuing Conservative Party leadership election in which Thatcher was ousted.

== Background ==
On 30 October 1990, a day after returning from the European Council summit meeting in Rome, Thatcher delivered a statement to the House of Commons on the summit. Both her foreign secretary Geoffrey Howe and chancellor Nigel Lawson had threatened resignation the previous year if Thatcher did not agree to let Britain join the European Exchange Rate Mechanism. Thatcher subsequently replaced Howe as foreign secretary with John Major, and appointed Howe leader of the House and deputy prime minister. At the summit, Thatcher went against her cabinet's joint position by rejecting Britain's membership of any future arrangement for an economic and monetary union.

Thatcher was speaking in response to a question from the Leader of the Opposition, Neil Kinnock, (Note: Kinnock asked her: "Does she not appreciate that, even now, her tantrum tactics will not stop the process of change or change anything in the process of change? All they do is strand Britain in a European second division without the influence over change that we need, the financial and industrial opportunities that we need and the sovereignty that we need.") when she said that:

The President of the Commission, Mr. Delors, said at a press conference the other day that he wanted the European Parliament to be the democratic body of the Community, he wanted the Commission to be the Executive and he wanted the Council of Ministers to be the Senate. No. No. No.

Thatcher then continued by contending that "perhaps the Labour Party would give all those things up, easily. Perhaps they would agree to a single currency, to total abolition of the pound sterling. Perhaps, being totally incompetent with monetary matters, they'd be only too delighted to hand over the full responsibility, as they did to the IMF, to a central bank", the final part of her statement a reference to the 1976 sterling crisis under a Labour government.

It was a spontaneous expression and had not been prepared.

== Reaction and impact ==
Thatcher's "No. No. No." response was seen as undermining any progress that had been made at the summit in Rome.

Following Thatcher's speech, Howe then resolved to resign from the government and join the backbenches after Thatcher dismissed further EEC integration and the potentiality of a single currency, which had been espoused by the Delors Commission, with her "No. No. No." It has been suggested that Howe's resignation speech is what ultimately led to the downfall of Thatcher's premiership.

Thatcher's biographer Charles Moore felt that she expressed her words "firmly" but "not vehemently", with each pronunciation of the negative exclamation "spoken quieter than the last" as she put her spectacles on, preparing to move on to her next point. Moore also felt that Thatcher's response was "endlessly and rightly quoted afterwards" as part of a "classic combative statement of her views" but was "almost always wrenched from its context"; she was not attacking the Community (EEC) or undermining her own government's policies, but was instead attacking the Commission for its ambition of further European integration (which her government and most Conservative MPs opposed), denouncing the idea that the EEC should acquire the attributes of a European government. Moore wrote that "for those long waiting to make their move [to replace her as prime minister] 'No. No. No.' was not so much a shock as a cue".

Other scholars have noted that Thatcher's "No. No. No." speech became a rallying cry for Eurosceptics, both within and outside the Conservative Party, and led to an entrenchment of Euroscepticism both within Conservative Party thought, and wider British political debates.

In a 1995 interview with Swedish journalist Stina Lundberg Dabrowski, Thatcher made a self-deprecating reference to the speech, responding to Dabrowski's repeated attempts to persuade Thatcher to jump at the end of the interview with "'No, no, no', to coin a phrase."

At the 2023 Conservative Party conference in Manchester, a number of items of the party's merchandise range included images of Thatcher saying "No, no, no", including baubles and Christmas jumpers.

== See also ==
- Geoffrey Howe's resignation speech
