= Geoffrey Howe =

British politician (1926–2015)

The Right Honourable The Lord Howe of Aberavon CH PC QC
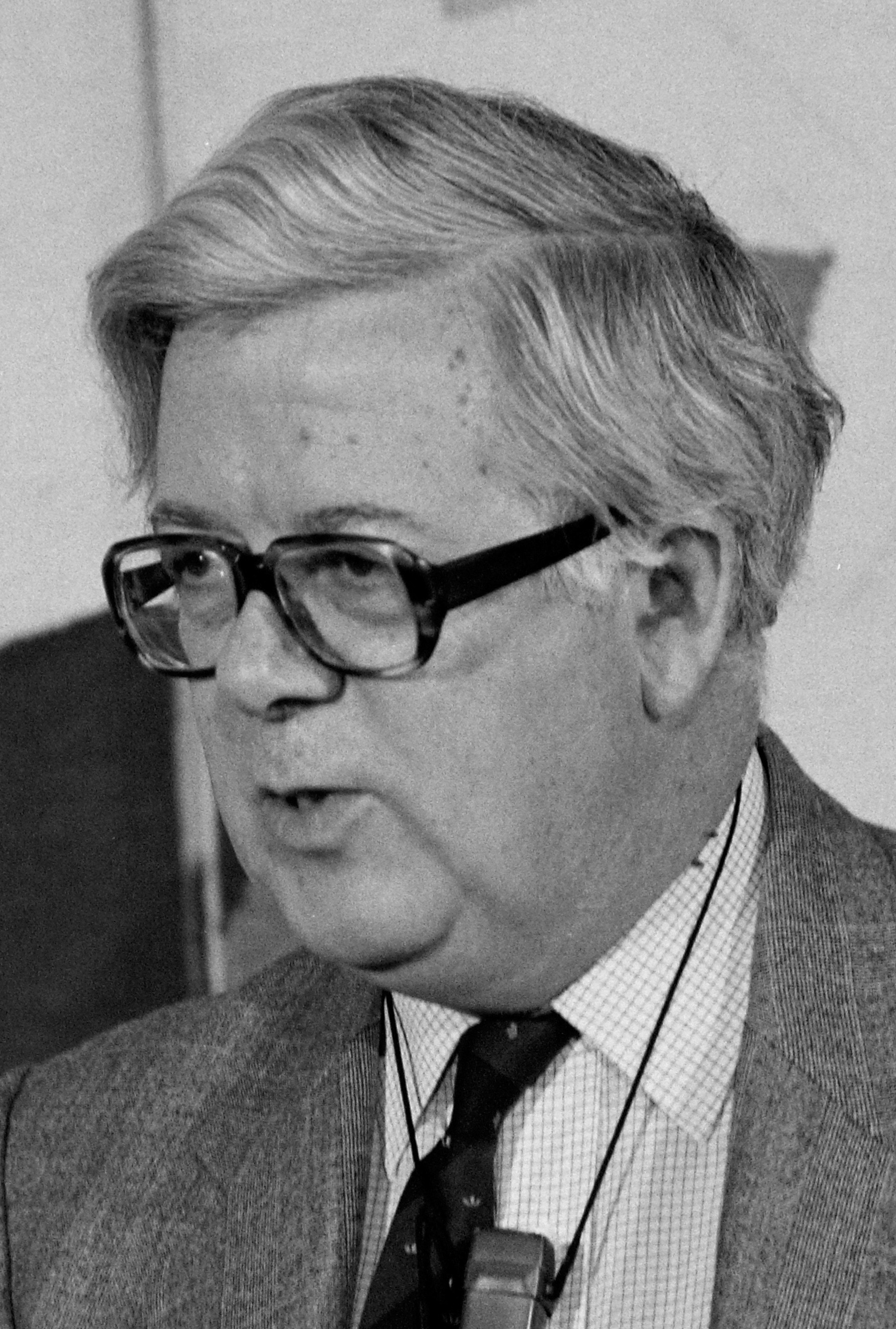
- Howe in 1990

Deputy Prime Minister of the United Kingdom
- In office 24 July 1989 – 1 November 1990
- Prime Minister: Margaret Thatcher
- Preceded by: The Viscount Whitelaw (de facto; 1988)
- Succeeded by: Michael Heseltine (1995)

Leader of the House of Commons; Lord President of the Council
- In office 24 July 1989 – 1 November 1990
- Prime Minister: Margaret Thatcher
- Preceded by: John Wakeham
- Succeeded by: John MacGregor

Secretary of State for Foreign and Commonwealth Affairs
- In office 11 June 1983 – 24 July 1989
- Prime Minister: Margaret Thatcher
- Preceded by: Francis Pym
- Succeeded by: John Major

Chancellor of the Exchequer
- In office 4 May 1979 – 11 June 1983
- Prime Minister: Margaret Thatcher
- Preceded by: Denis Healey
- Succeeded by: Nigel Lawson
Shadow Cabinet posts
Shadow Chancellor of the Exchequer
In office 18 February 1975 – 4 May 1979
Leader	Margaret Thatcher
Preceded by	Robert Carr
Succeeded by	Denis Healey
Shadow Secretary of State for Health and Social Services
In office 11 March 1974 – 18 February 1975
Leader	Edward Heath
Preceded by	Keith Joseph
Succeeded by	Norman Fowler
Junior ministerial offices 1970‍–‍1974
Minister of State for Trade and Consumer Affairs
In office 5 November 1972 – 4 March 1974
Prime Minister	Edward Heath
Preceded by	Michael Noble
Succeeded by	Eric Deakins
Solicitor General for England and Wales
In office 23 June 1970 – 5 November 1972
Prime Minister	Edward Heath
Preceded by	Arthur Irvine
Succeeded by	Michael Havers
Parliamentary offices
Member of the House of Lords
Lord Temporal
Life peerage
30 June 1992 – 19 May 2015

Member of Parliament
- In office 18 June 1970 – 16 March 1992
- Preceded by: John Vaughan-Morgan
- Succeeded by: Peter Ainsworth
- Constituency: Reigate (1970–1974); East Surrey (1974–1992)
- In office 15 October 1964 – 10 March 1966
- Preceded by: Hendrie Oakshott
- Succeeded by: Edwin Brooks
- Constituency: Bebington

Personal details
- Born: Richard Edward Geoffrey Howe; 20 December 1926 Port Talbot, Glamorgan, Wales
- Died: 9 October 2015 (aged 88) Idlicote, Warwickshire, England
- Party: Conservative
- Spouse: Elspeth Shand (m. 1953)
- Children: 3
- Education: Trinity Hall, Cambridge (BA)
- Occupation: Barrister; politician

Military service
- Branch/service: British Army
- Rank: Lieutenant
- Unit: Royal Corps of Signals

Richard Edward Geoffrey Howe, Baron Howe of Aberavon (20 December 1926 – 9 October 2015), known from 1970 to 1992 as Sir Geoffrey Howe, was a British barrister and politician who served as chancellor of the Exchequer from 1979 to 1983, and Deputy Prime Minister of the United Kingdom from 1989 to 1990. A member of the Conservative Party, he was Margaret Thatcher's longest-serving Cabinet minister, successively holding the posts of chancellor of the Exchequer, foreign secretary, then leader of the House of Commons, deputy prime minister and lord president of the Council. His resignation from Cabinet on 1 November 1990 is widely considered to have precipitated the leadership challenge that led to Thatcher's resignation three weeks later.

Born in Port Talbot, Wales, Howe was educated at Bridgend Preparatory School, Abberley Hall School, Winchester College, and – after serving in the army as a lieutenant – Trinity Hall, Cambridge, where he read law. He was called to the bar in 1952 and practised in Wales, after which he was elected as the Conservative member of Parliament (MP) for Bebington in 1964, but lost his seat in 1966, returning to the bar. Howe became an MP again at the 1970 general election and represented various constituencies in the House of Commons until 1992. In Edward Heath's government, he was solicitor general and a minister of state; after Labour's victory in 1974, Howe became the shadow chancellor of the Exchequer in Margaret Thatcher's shadow cabinet.

Howe became Chancellor of the Exchequer upon Thatcher's victory in the 1979 general election, with his tenure characterised by a programme of radical policies with the stated intent to restore the public finances, reduce inflation and liberalise the economy. As chancellor, Howe delivered five budgets. After the 1983 general election, Howe was appointed foreign secretary, serving six years. In 1989, Thatcher replaced Howe with John Major, giving Howe the role of deputy prime minister. He resigned from the government on 1 November 1990; in his resignation letter, he criticised Thatcher's handling of relations with the EEC and further attacked Thatcher in his resignation speech to the Commons on 13 November. The speech was widely seen as the key catalyst for the leadership challenge mounted by Michael Heseltine a few days later, which led to Thatcher's resignation and her replacement by Major.

Howe retired as an MP in 1992 and was made a life peer in June of that year. Following his retirement from the Commons, Howe took on several non-executive directorships in business and advisory posts in law and academia. He retired from the House of Lords in May 2015 and died in October of the same year, aged 88.

== Early life and education ==
Howe was born in 1926 at Port Talbot, Wales, to Benjamin Edward Howe, a solicitor and coroner, and Eliza Florence (née Thomson) Howe. He was to describe himself as a quarter Scottish, a quarter Cornish and half Welsh. He had one older sister, Barbara, who died of meningitis just before he was born, and a younger brother, Colin.

He was educated at three private schools: at Bridgend Preparatory School in Bryntirion, followed by Abberley Hall School in Worcestershire and by winning an exhibition to Winchester College in Hampshire. Howe was not sporty, joining the debating society instead. It was during wartime, so he was active in the Home Guard at the school and set up a National Savings group. He was also a keen photographer and film buff. A gifted classicist, Howe was offered an exhibition to Trinity Hall, Cambridge in 1945 but first decided to join the army. He did a six-month course in maths and physics. Then he did national service as a lieutenant with the Royal Corps of Signals in East Africa, by his own account giving political lectures in Swahili about how Africans should avoid communism and remain loyal to "Bwana Kingy George"; and also climbed Mount Kilimanjaro.

Having declined an offer to remain in the army as a captain, he matriculated at Trinity Hall in 1948, where he read law and was chairman of the Cambridge University Conservative Association, and on the committee of the Cambridge Union Society. He was called to the bar by the Middle Temple in 1952 and practised in Wales. On 28 August 1953, Howe married Elspeth Shand, daughter of P. Morton Shand. They had a son and two daughters. At first, his legal practice struggled to pay, surviving thanks to a £1,200 gift from his father and a prudent marriage. He served on the Council of the Bar from 1957 to 1962 and was a council member of the pressure group JUSTICE. A high-earning barrister, he was made a QC in 1965.

Choosing a parallel career in politics, Howe stood as the Conservative Party candidate in his native Aberavon at the 1955 and 1959 general elections, losing in what was a very safe Labour Party seat. He helped to found the Bow Group, an internal Conservative think tank of "young modernisers" in the 1950s; he was one of its first chairmen in 1955–1956 and edited its magazine Crossbow from 1960 to 1962. In 1958, he co-authored the report A Giant's Strength published by the Inns of Court Conservative Association. The report argued that the unions had become too powerful and that their legal privileges should be curtailed. Iain Macleod discouraged the authors from publicising the report.

Harold Macmillan believed that trade union votes had contributed towards the 1951 and 1955 election victories and thought that it "would be inexpedient to adopt any policy involving legislation which would alienate this support". Through a series of Bow Group publications, Howe advanced free market ideas, primarily inspired by the thinking of Enoch Powell, which was later to be known as Thatcherism.

== Early political career ==
=== Backbencher ===
Howe represented Bebington in the House of Commons from 1964 to 1966 with a much-reduced majority. He became a chairman of the backbench committee on social services, being quickly recognised for promotion to the front bench as HM Opposition spokesman on welfare and labour policy. He was defeated at the 1966 general election.

Howe returned to the bar. He participated in the 1966 Aberfan Disaster Tribunal, representing the colliery managers. He sat as deputy chairman of Glamorgan quarter sessions. More politically significant was working on the Latey Committee, tasked with recommending a reduction in the voting age. In 1969, he chaired the committee of inquiry to investigate alleged abuse at Ely Mental Hospital, Cardiff. On Howe's insistence, the inquiry's remit was expanded to cover the treatment of patients with intellectual disabilities within the National Health Service. The report greatly impacted mental health provision in the UK, beginning a process that led to the widespread closure of large mental hospitals. But of more legislative importance were the Street Committee on racial discrimination, and Cripps Committee on discrimination against women, the reports of which helped the Labour government to change the law.

He returned to the House of Commons as the MP for Reigate from 1970 to 1974 and East Surrey from 1974 to 1992. In 1970, he was appointed Solicitor General in Edward Heath's government and was knighted. He was responsible for the Industrial Relations Act that caused immediate retaliatory union strikes. He was promoted in 1972 to Minister of State at the Department of Trade and Industry, with a seat in the Cabinet and Privy Council membership, a post he held until Labour was returned to government in March 1974.

=== Shadow Cabinet ===
In 1974, boundary changes to Howe's constituency of Reigate led to it being renamed as East Surrey, and Heath appointed Howe as spokesman for social services. Howe contested the second ballot of the 1975 Conservative leadership election, in which Margaret Thatcher was elected as party leader. She saw him as a like-minded right-winger, and he was appointed Shadow Chancellor of the Exchequer. He masterminded the development of new economic policies embodied in an opposition mini-manifesto The Right Approach to the Economy.

At the same time, in response to the 1976 sterling crisis, Labour Chancellor of the Exchequer Denis Healey had requested a loan of $3.9 billion from the International Monetary Fund (IMF); at the time, it was the largest loan request the IMF had ever received. In 1978, Healey joked that Howe's criticism was "like being savaged by a dead sheep". Nevertheless, when Healey was featured on This Is Your Life in 1989, Howe appeared and paid warm tribute.

== Thatcher government ==
=== Chancellor of the Exchequer ===
With the Conservative victory in the 1979 general election, Howe became Chancellor of the Exchequer. His tenure was characterised by an ambitious programme of radical policies intended to restore the public finances, reduce inflation and liberalise the economy. The shift from direct to indirect taxation, the development of a medium-term financial strategy, the abolition of exchange controls and the creation of tax-free enterprise zones were among the most important decisions of his chancellorship.

The first of five budgets, in 1979, promised to honour Professor Hugh Clegg's report that recommended a return to pre-1975 pay levels in real terms, conceding Howe's point about "concerted action". (Note: Clegg was chairman for the Pay Comparability Commission.) Rampant inflation had, however, eroded competitiveness, and devalued pensions, investments, and wages. Thatcher reminded him: "On your own head be it, Geoffrey, if anything goes wrong," commencing an often tense and querulous working relationship. Thatcher's point was that the vast increase in (indirect) taxation and government spending (notably in public sector pay) in 1979 would lead to terrible consequences – which it did, as unemployment doubled. The financial policy tightened the money supply and restricted public sector pay, ultimately driving up inflation, at least in the short term, and unemployment in the medium term.

Fundamentally we do believe in German principles of economic management and should be able to get ourselves alongside them ... pronounce in favour of ... providing greater stability as encouraging convergence on economic policies.

During Thatcher's first term, the government's poll ratings plummeted until the "Falklands Factor". Howe's 1981 Budget defied conventional economic wisdom by reducing public spending during a recession. At the time, his approach was fiercely criticised by 364 academic economists in a letter to The Times, who contended that there was no place for a deflationary policy in the economic climate of the time, and remarking the budget had "no basis in economic theory or supporting evidence". Many signatories were prominent academics, including Mervyn King who later became the Governor of the Bank of England.

Howe's claimed rationale for his proposals was that by reducing the deficit, which at the time was £9.3 billion (3.6% GDP), and controlling inflation, long-term interest rates would be able to decline, thus re-stimulating the economy. Inflation did fall, from 11.9% in early 1981 to 3.8% in February 1983, and long-term interest rates fell from 14% in 1981 to 10% in 1983. The economy slowly climbed out of recession. However, already extremely high unemployment was pushed to a 50-year high of 12% by 1984, almost equalling the level of 13.5% reached during the Great Depression. Some have argued that the budget, although ultimately successful, was nevertheless excessive. Specialist opinions on the question, expressed with 25 years' hindsight, are collected in an Institute of Economic Affairs report.

Unlike Reaganomics, Howe's macro-economic policy emphasised the need to reduce the budget deficit rather than engage in unilateral tax cuts – "I never succumbed ... to the mistaken interpretations of Lafferism, which have led some US policymakers so far astray"; despite these measures the budget deficit remained on average 3% of GDP during Howe's tenure. His macroeconomic policy was designed to liberalise the economy and promote supply-side reform. This combination of policies became one of the defining features of Thatcherism in power. (Note: As noted, for example, by Lawson (2006, p. 123) and preceding.) However, by the time of his last budget, shortly before a general election, there were early signs of a recovery, which Howe used to justify a tax cut.

Documents released under the British government's 30-year rule in 2011 revealed that in the wake of the Toxteth riots in Liverpool in 1981, Howe had warned Thatcher "not to overcommit scarce resources to Liverpool", writing that "It would be even more regrettable if some of the brighter ideas for renewing economic activity were to be sown only on relatively stony ground on the banks of the Mersey. I cannot help feeling that the option of managed decline is one which we should not forget altogether. We must not expend all our limited resources in trying to make water flow uphill". Howe later stated that he had not advocated the "managed decline" policy and that he had merely been warning of the danger of concentrating excessive resources on one area of need.

=== Foreign Secretary ===
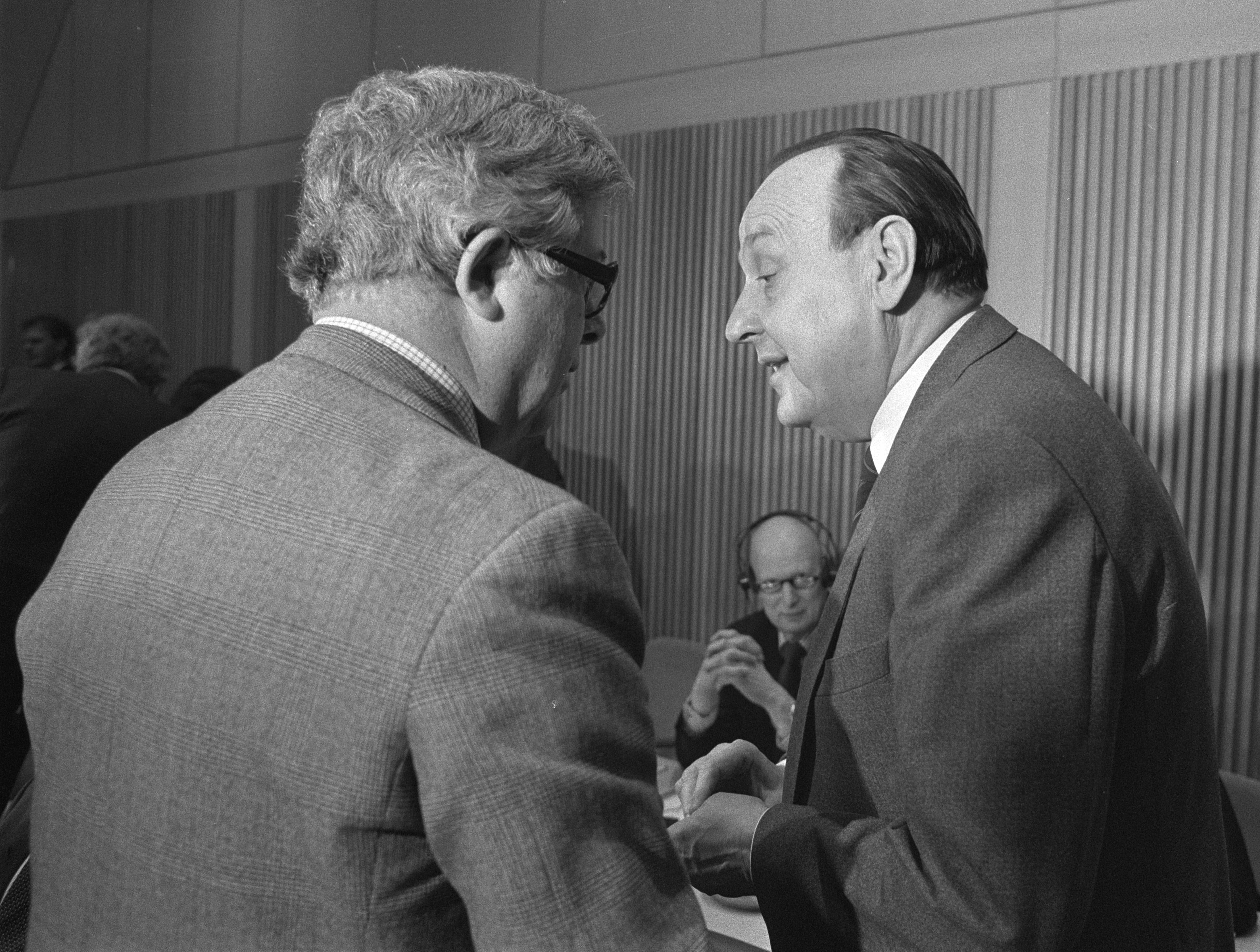
Howe (left) in conversation with West German counterpart Hans-Dietrich Genscher, 1986

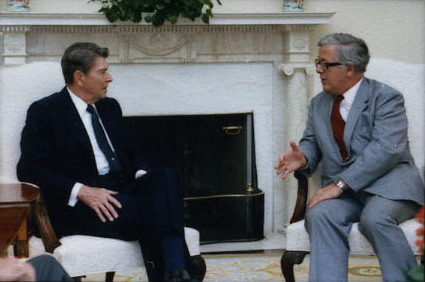
Howe with US president Ronald Reagan in 1986

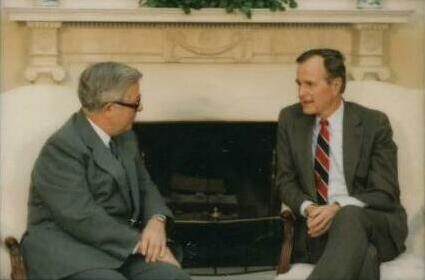
Howe with US president George H. W. Bush in 1989

After the 1983 general election, Thatcher reluctantly appointed Howe Foreign Secretary, a post he held for six years, the longest tenure since Sir Edward Grey in 1905–1916. With "the quiet determination" applied in the Treasury, he set off on a tour of Warsaw Pact countries, interviewing communist leaders and sounding out opponents. The trip opened the way to further discussions with Mikhail Gorbachev, with whom he believed Thatcher shared "extraordinary chemistry." He later looked back on this period (1983–1985) as his happiest and most fruitful and productive, engaging with world leaders across the summit table, sharing decisions with Thatcher, including a notable encounter with Caspar Weinberger on 6 September 1982. Success with the Americans proved decisive in bringing about the end of Communism in Europe.

Howe was closely involved in the negotiations leading up to the 1984 Sino-British Joint Declaration on the future of Hong Kong, and developed a good working relationship with the United States Secretary of State, George Shultz, mirroring the close connection between Thatcher and President Ronald Reagan. However, Howe's tenure was made difficult by growing behind-the-scenes tensions with the Prime Minister on a number of issues, first on South Africa, next on Britain's relations with the European Community, and then in 1985 the Anglo-Irish Agreement. For his staff, Howe was a respected boss; mild-mannered, polite and courteous, he was assiduous in his attention to detail. However, the human rights questions over South African sanctions and trade embargo, coupled with his deep concern over Thatcher's strident style in Europe, increasingly drove a stressful wedge between Nos. 10 and 11. They began to drift apart on policy objectives with fatal consequences for the Prime Minister's ambitions. Thatcher's dominant style contrasted with his emollience, patience and capacity for negotiation. Their differences were dated to the Westland Affair in 1986, when senior ministers almost forced her to resign, according to Douglas Hurd's memoirs.

In June 1989, Howe and his successor as chancellor, Nigel Lawson, both secretly threatened to resign over Thatcher's opposition to proposed British membership of the exchange rate mechanism of the European Monetary System. Howe supported the ERM because of his general support of European integration and because he had become convinced as chancellor of the need for more exchange rate stability. She turned increasingly for advice to her No.10 private secretary Charles Powell, Private Secretary for Foreign Affairs to the Prime Minister, a career diplomat who contrasted with Howe's mandarin-style. Howe remarked: "She was often exasperated by my tenaciously quiet brand of advocacy." His friends often wondered why he put up with her style for so long, but many considered him her successor. One historian has suggested that the government would have survived even the ructions over Europe had Howe remained her ally.

=== Deputy prime minister ===
In July 1989, the then little-known John Major was unexpectedly appointed to replace Howe as Foreign Secretary. Howe became Leader of the House of Commons, Lord President of the Council and Deputy Prime Minister. In the reshuffle, Howe was also offered, but turned down, the post of Home Secretary. Although attempts were made to belittle this aspect, Howe's move back to domestic politics was generally seen as a demotion, especially after Thatcher's press secretary Bernard Ingham belittled the significance of the deputy prime minister appointment, saying that the title had no constitutional significance, at his lobby briefing the following morning.

Howe then had to give up the Foreign Secretary's country residence Chevening. The sceptical attitude towards Howe in Number 10 weakened him politically – even if it might have been driven to some degree by fear of him as a possible successor, a problem compounded by the resignation from the Treasury of his principal ally Nigel Lawson later in the same year. During his time as deputy prime minister, Howe made a series of coded calls on Thatcher to realign her administration, which was suffering rising unpopularity following its introduction of the poll tax, as a "listening government".

=== Relationship with Thatcher ===
Tensions began to emerge in 1982 during the Falklands War when Thatcher, on the advice of Harold Macmillan (who warned against including the Treasury), refused to appoint him to the war cabinet. During his first budget, Thatcher wrote to Adam Ridley: "The trouble with people like Geoffrey – lawyers – they are too timid." On the occasion of the general election victory of 1983, there were heated exchanges of views in No. 10 on her decision to move him to the Foreign Office. Howe was one of those who persuaded Michael Heseltine that on balance, it was probably better that he, rather than she, resign during the Westland affair in 1986. At the Scottish Party Conference in Perth in 1987, Howe spelt out his position for the European single market and the proposed Delors Plan (Thatcher having accepted the Single European Act in 1986). In the following year, Thatcher made her speech at Bruges declining the offer to deepen the bureaucratic state towards a "Federalist Superstate".

At the Madrid inter-governmental conference, the tensions were ratcheted higher as Thatcher emphatically renounced any advance in British policy over the European agenda for "ever closer union" of political and economic forces. Howe forced her to give conditions for entering the proposal for entry to the ERM in June 1989. Howe and Nigel Lawson threatened to resign, but she called his bluff by appointing John Major over his head. Howe resented having to give up the state residence of Chevening in Kent on being effectively demoted to Lord President of the Council. He deeply resented leaving the Foreign and Commonwealth Office, a job he had always coveted. When Lawson resigned, it looked like a natural reshuffle, but Howe was frozen out of the inner circle. When Howe attended a meeting with the Queen, he found that Britain had joined the ERM before he had been informed about it – the ERM had been Howe's policy. The pound sterling was thus pegged to the Deutsche Mark instead of the US dollar. The consequence was that Britain's currency was pummelled into devaluation by a much stronger German economy – the option to leave cost Britain billions in 1992. But at the Rome Summit in October 1990, Thatcher was said to have exclaimed, in a fit of pique, "no, no, no" to the Delors Plan and repeated the government's policy at Paris summit on 18–20 November. She also repeated the "no, no, no" message in the House of Commons on her return to Westminster. Howe had told Brian Walden (a former Labour MP) on ITV's Weekend World that the "government did not oppose the principle of a single currency", which was factually accurate – as its policy was that the "hard ECU" could evolve into a single currency, but that a single currency should not be imposed – but contrary to Thatcher's emerging view.

=== Resignation ===
Howe tendered his resignation on 1 November 1990. Sometimes mocked as "Mogadon man" – Mogadon being a well-known sleeping medication – Howe delivered a blow to Thatcher's government in full view of Prime Minister's Questions and a packed House of Commons on 13 November. Howe later contended that the Community Charge was incompetently implemented, but it was the direction of European policy rather than domestic rioting that tipped the balance. His dispute with Thatcher was over matters of substance more than ones of style; he advocated a move back towards a more centrist position on constitutional and administrative issues, such as taxation and European integration. Howe represented a moderate position in the party, being educated, lawyerly, and diligent; while direct, he was conciliatory and collegial in style.

Howe wrote a cautiously worded letter of resignation in which he criticised the Prime Minister's overall handling of UK relations with the European Community. After largely successful attempts by 10 Downing Street to claim that there were differences only in style, rather than substance, in Howe's disagreement with Thatcher on Europe, Howe chose to send a powerful message of dissent. In his resignation speech in the Commons on 13 November 1990, he attacked Thatcher for running increasingly serious risks for the country's future. He criticised her for undermining the policies on EMU proposed by her chancellor and governor of the Bank of England.

Howe offered a cricket simile for British negotiations on EMU in Europe: "It's rather like sending our opening batsmen to the crease only for them to find that before the first ball is bowled, their bats have been broken by the team captain." The simile was written by his wife, Elspeth, who was an avid cricket fan and had watched Thatcher use a cricket metaphor on the news the night before Howe gave his speech. He ended his speech with an appeal to cabinet colleagues: "The time has come for others to consider their own response to the tragic conflict of loyalties, with which I have myself wrestled for perhaps too long." A few days later, Cledwyn Hughes, the Labour leader in the Lords, said: "I much regretted the departure of Sir Geoffrey Howe from his office and from the Government. Sir Geoffrey was an outstanding member of the Prime Minister's Administration since 1979 and his decision to leave reveals a fatal flaw in the management of our affairs."

Although Howe subsequently wrote in his memoir Conflict of Loyalty that his intention was only to constrain any shift in European policy by the Cabinet under the existing prime minister, his speech is widely seen as the key catalyst for the leadership challenge mounted by Michael Heseltine a few days later. Although Thatcher won the most votes in the leadership election, she did not win by a large enough margin to win outright. Subsequently, she withdrew from the contest on 22 November. Five days later, Chancellor of the Exchequer John Major was elected party leader and thus became prime minister. The change proved to be a positive one for the Tories, who had trailed Labour in most opinion polls by a double-digit margin throughout 1990 but soon returned to the top of the polls and won the general election in April 1992.

== Retirement ==
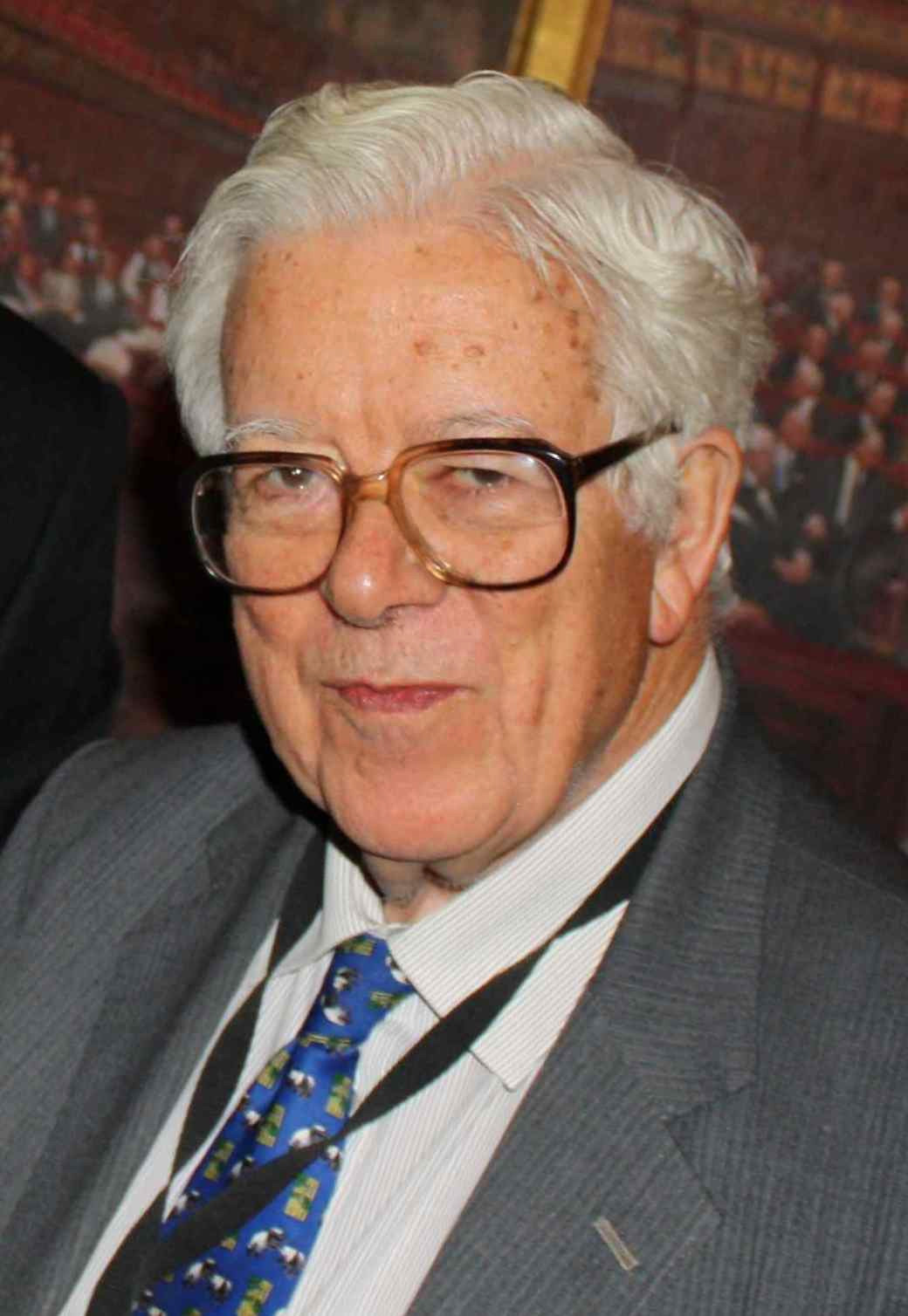
Howe in 2011

Howe retired from the House of Commons in 1992 and was made a life peer on 30 June 1992 as Baron Howe of Aberavon, of Tandridge in the County of Surrey. He published his memoirs Conflict of Loyalty (1994) soon after. In the Lords, Howe continued to speak on a wide range of foreign-policy and European issues and led opposition to the Labour government's plans from 1997 to convert the second chamber into a largely elected body (Note: Howe subsequently stated that the "last thing that people want to see here are clones of the clowns in the Commons", and served on the joint committee on the proposed legislation in 2002–03.) – a position reiterated in the face of Coalition proposals in 2012. He retired from the House of Lords on 19 May 2015.

Following his retirement from the Commons, Howe took on several non-executive directorships in business and advisory posts in law and academia, including as an international political adviser to the US law firm Jones Day, a director of GlaxoSmithKline and J. P. Morgan, and visitor at the School of Oriental and African Studies (SOAS), University of London.

His wife, Elspeth, a former chairman of the Broadcasting Standards Commission, was made a life peer in 2001. The Baroness Howe of Idlicote and her husband were among the few couples holding titles in their own right. Lord Howe was a patron of the UK Metric Association and the Conservative Foreign and Commonwealth Council. Howe was appointed a Member of the Order of the Companions of Honour (CH) in the 1996 Birthday Honours. He was an honorary fellow of SOAS. From 1996 to 2006 he was president of the Academy of Experts and in November 2014 was made an honorary fellow of the organisation in recognition of his contribution to the development of methods of dispute resolution.

Howe was a close friend of Ian Gow, the former MP, parliamentary private secretary, and personal confidant of Margaret Thatcher. He delivered the principal appreciation of Gow at the latter's memorial service after the IRA murdered Gow in July 1990. Obituarists noted how Howe was "warm and well liked by colleagues", with Nigel Lawson writing that he would be remembered by those who knew him "as one of the kindest and nicest men in politics" who, according to Andrew Rawnsley of The Observer, was frequently spoken of by fellow politicians "as one of the most honest and decent practitioners of their profession".

Howe died from a heart attack at his home in Idlicote, Warwickshire, on 9 October 2015, at the age of 88.

== In popular culture ==
Howe's dramatic resignation speech in the House of Commons formed the basis of Jonathan Maitland's 2015 play Dead Sheep. Howe was interviewed in 2012 as part of The History of Parliament's oral history project.

Howe has been depicted multiple times in film and television, including being portrayed by Paul Rogers in Thatcher: The Final Days (1991), John Sessions in Margaret (2009), Anthony Head in The Iron Lady (2011), Paul Jesson in season four of The Crown (2020), and Paul Higgins in Brian and Maggie (2025).

== Arms ==
Coat of arms of Geoffrey Howe
Crest Upon a howe turfed Proper a wolf courant Sable mantled with a fleece of a sheep sans head holding in its mouth a remnant of cloth Gules. Escutcheon Chequy Or and Azure on a chief per pale Vert and Gules a portcullis chained Gold. Supporters Dexter a dragon Gules armed and langued Azure gorged with a collar compony Sable and Argent the Sable charged with a crescent Ermine the Argent with a rose Gules barbed and seeded Proper holding in its exterior foreclaw a sword erect Argent hilt pommel and quillons Or sinister a winged lion Or armed and langued Gules similarly gorged resting its interior hind leg upon a clarion also Gold. Compartment Three howes turfed with daffodils and sprigs of oak fructed all Proper. Motto Tibi Fidelis (To Yourself True)

== Notes ==
Parliament of the United Kingdom
Preceded by Hendrie Oakshott	Member of Parliament for Bebington; 1964–1966	Succeeded by Edwin Brooks
Preceded by John Vaughan-Morgan	Member of Parliament for Reigate; 1970–1974	Succeeded by George Gardiner
Preceded by William Clark	Member of Parliament for East Surrey; 1974–1992	Succeeded by Peter Ainsworth
Legal offices
Preceded by Arthur Irvine	Solicitor General for England and Wales; 1970–1972	Succeeded by Michael Havers
Political offices
Preceded by Robert Carr	Shadow Chancellor of the Exchequer; 1975–1979	Succeeded by Denis Healey
Preceded by Denis Healey	Chancellor of the Exchequer; 1979–1983	Succeeded by Nigel Lawson
Preceded by Denis Healey	Second Lord of the Treasury; 1979–1983	Succeeded by Nigel Lawson
Preceded by Francis Pym	Secretary of State for Foreign and Commonwealth Affairs; 1983–1989	Succeeded by John Major
Preceded by The Viscount Whitelaw	Deputy Prime Minister of the United Kingdom; 1989–1990	Succeeded by Michael Heseltine
Preceded by John Wakeham	Leader of the House of Commons; 1989–1990	Succeeded by John MacGregor
Preceded by John Wakeham	Lord President of the Council; 1989–1990	Succeeded by John MacGregor
