= Wets and dries =

Factions in the British Conservative Party

Wets and dries are British political terms that refer to opposing factions within the Conservative Party. The terms originated in the 1980s during the premiership of Margaret Thatcher: those who opposed some of Thatcher's more hard-line policies were often referred to by their opponents as "wets"; in response, supporters of Thatcher were referred to as "dries".

== Etymology ==
In British slang, "wet" meant weak, "inept, ineffectual, effete". Within the political context, the term was used by Thatcher's supporters as both as a noun and as an adjective to characterise people or policies which Thatcher would have considered weak or "wet". Thatcher coined the usage in 1979–80, with the meaning of feeble, lacking hardness, or willing to compromise with the unions. The label was especially applied to senior members of Thatcher's government who were nevertheless outside her inner circle and who expressed opposition to her strict monetarist policies, and her cuts to public spending.

== History ==
Hugo Young identifies the most important "inner" wets as Jim Prior, Peter Walker, and Sir Ian Gilmour, as well as Lord Carrington and Norman St John-Stevas. The "outer" wets were more fragmented and less visible. They included Francis Pym, Michael Heseltine and Lord Hailsham.

Gilmour was the most outspoken, delivering a lecture at Cambridge in February 1980 where he argued: "In the Conservative view, economic liberalism à la Professor Hayek, because of its starkness and its failure to create a sense of community, is not a safeguard of political freedom but a threat to it."

In the 1980s, Nick's Diner was started. Named in honour of Nicholas Scott, at the time a rising star of the anti-Thatcher wing of the Party, it served as a convivial meeting ground for wet MPs.

In retaliation to being labelled as "wet", Thatcher's opponents within the party began referring to her supporters as the "dries". Policies which came to be labelled as "dry" included foremostly reducing public spending, cutting taxes, raising interest rates, tightly controlling the money supply, and reducing the regulatory power of the state – all policies which were closely associated with Thatcher.

Outside of the Parliamentary Conservative Party, the youth sections of the Party saw increasingly bitter factional battles between "wets" and "dries". The Young Conservatives wing of the party remained in the hands of a strong "wet" and One Nation (Tory Reform Group) faction until 1989, whilst the Federation of Conservative Students remained in the hands of an alliance of libertarian and Monday Club supporters.

During her first two years as prime minister, Margaret Thatcher led a cabinet that was dominated by "wets." Following a cabinet reshuffle in September 1981, however, the balance of the cabinet was tipped “in favour of the “Dries”” as noted by Michael Heseltine. According to Nigel Lawson, as a result of this reshuffle “Margaret Thatcher at last secured a Cabinet with a Thatcherite majority.”

=== Australia ===
A similar factional identification exists in the Liberal Party of Australia, which is also a centre-right party like the Tories. The split in the Australian Liberal Party is in terms of social policy between right-wing social conservatives and socially progressive Liberals, better known as moderates.

== Notable parliamentary members ==
=== Wets ===
- Anthony Barber
- Lord Carrington
- Kenneth Clarke
- Stephen Dorrell
- Sir Ian Gilmour
- Alan Haselhurst
- Edward Heath
- Michael Heseltine
- David Hunt
- Douglas Hurd
- David Knox
- Sir Anthony Meyer
- Jim Prior
- Francis Pym
- Nicholas Scott
- Fred Silvester
- Norman St John-Stevas
- William Waldegrave
- Peter Walker
- David Cameron
- Theresa May
- Boris Johnson
- Sir George Young

=== Dries ===
- John Biffen
- Leon Brittan
- Michael Brown
- Rhodes Boyson
- Alan Clark
- Michael Forsyth
- Ian Gow
- Neil Hamilton
- Michael Howard
- Gerald Howarth
- Geoffrey Howe
- Keith Joseph
- Nigel Lawson
- Peter Lilley
- Francis Maude
- John Nott
- Cecil Parkinson
- Michael Portillo
- John Redwood
- Nicholas Ridley
- Norman Tebbit
- Margaret Thatcher
- David Young
- Sir Jacob Rees-Mogg
- Liz Truss
- Oliver Dowden

== See also ==
- Fundamentalists and gradualists
- List of ministers under Margaret Thatcher
- One-nation conservatism
- Red Tory
- Young Conservatives
