= Andrew Osmond (satirist) =

British diplomat and satirist (1938–1999)

Andrew Philip Kingsford Osmond (16 March 1938 – 14 April 1999) was a British diplomat, novelist and one of the co-founders of Private Eye magazine in 1961.

Born in Barnoldby-le-Beck, Lincolnshire, on 16 March 1938, Osmond was the son of Kingsford Osmond, a scion of a well-known Lincolnshire farming family. Educated at Harrow School and Brasenose College, Oxford (1961), Osmond joined the Foreign Office in 1962, being posted first to West Africa – where he met Douglas Hurd – then subsequently Rome.

He gave Private Eye its name, but had sold the majority of his shares less than a year after its launch. He returned to the Eye as managing director in 1969, increasing sales by 160% during his four-year tenure.

== Published works ==
- Send Him Victorious (1968) with Douglas Hurd
- The Smile on the Face of the Tiger (1969) with Douglas Hurd
- Scotch on the Rocks (1971) with Douglas Hurd
- Harris in Wonderland: By Philip Reid (pseudonym of Richard Ingrams and Andrew Osmond) 1973
- Saladin! (1975)
- Plenty
