= Jonathan Maitland =

British playwright

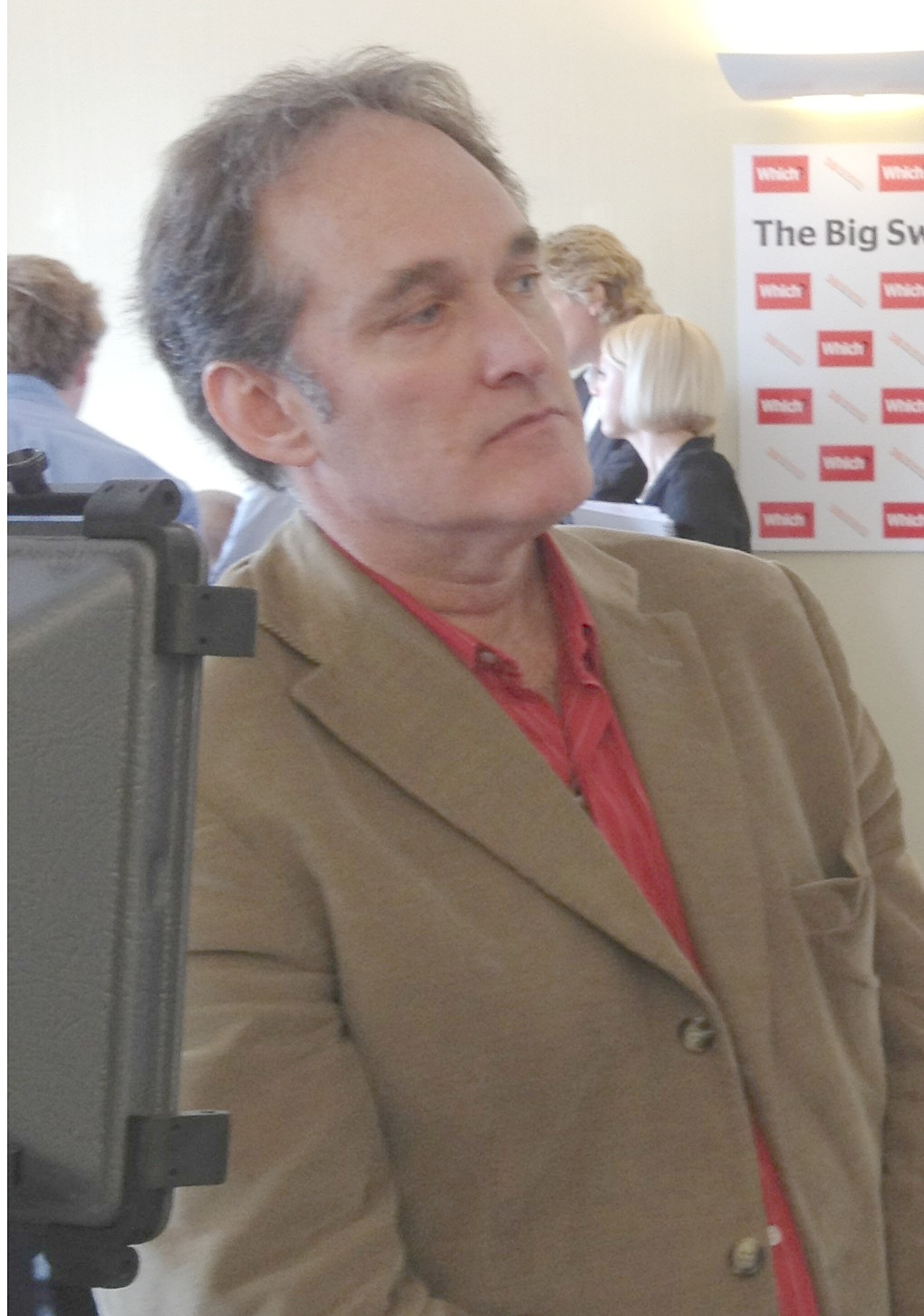
Jonathan Maitland in May 2012

Jonathan Maitland is a British playwright and former broadcaster.

== Early life ==
Maitland attended boarding schools from the age of three. His parents divorced when he was six years old.

== Journalism ==
Maitland started his writing career in the 1980s as a reporter on The Sutton Guardian. He reported for BBC Radio Bristol and BBC Radio 4's Today programme. He was also a general correspondent for BBC News. From 1995–98 he presented and produced factual shows on BBC 1. He was also one of the reporters for Watchdog and presented a spin off called The Big Dinner

In 1999 he was poached by ITV to present BAFTA winning current affairs show Tonight and the BAFTA nominated House of Horrors, the first show to secretly film and expose rogue traders and builders.

== Writing ==
Maitland has written five books including How to Make your Million from the Internet (and what to do if you don't), which explored the dot com boom. His memoir How to Survive your Mother described his unconventional childhood in suburban Surrey. Aged three he was sent to boarding school, and at 13 his mother turned the family hotel in Epsom into a retreat for homosexuals.

Maitland has written two radio plays and seven stage plays. Dead Sheep, about the Geoffrey Howe speech which led to Margaret Thatcher's downfall, was staged at the Park Theatre in London in 2015. It received positive reviews and the Independent called it a "...fine, often very funny debut play." It went on a national tour in 2016. In June 2023, a BBC Radio 4 adaptation, Wasps in a Jam Jar, starred Dame Penelope Wilton, Dame Harriet Walter and James Fleet. Maitland's second play at the Park was An Audience With Jimmy Savile. It broke box office records at the theatre and The Observer described the play's central performance by Alistair McGowan as "Uncanny ... creepily powerful ... shocking." The show was transferred to the Edinburgh Fringe in August. Maitland's third play, Deny Deny Deny, about medical and ethical dilemmas, was also staged at the Park. The Daily Telegraph called it "a gripping, Faustian take on Olympic doping."

In May 2019, The Last Temptation of Boris Johnson opened at the Park Theatre. Act One centred on the February 2016 dinner party at Johnson's home in Islington with Michael Gove, after which he decided to campaign for Vote Leave. The second act posited that Johnson resigned as Prime Minister in 2022 (this actually happened in real life) and is set in 2029 when he makes another run at the leadership, based on taking the UK back into the EU. The play broke previous box office records and sold out its entire run but received mixed reviews; Ann Treneman in The Times gave the play four stars out of five, calling it 'politics...served deliciously pink'. In The New European, Martin McQuillan praised Maitland's "remarkable play" with a five-star review, but Michael Billington in The Guardian gave it two stars, concluding that "Maitland's mind-changing hero is not nearly as interesting as he thinks he is." The play completed an eight week national tour in March 2020.

Maitland's fifth play, The Interview, about the Martin Bashir/Princess Diana Panorama programme, premiered at the Park Theatre on 27 October 2023. His play with music about Wilko Johnson, the guitarist and founder of the band Dr Feelgood, premiered at the Queen's Theatre, Hornchurch on 1 February 2024 and received positive reviews. The Reviews Hub, awarding it fours stars, called it "an extraordinary story... magnificent" and The Guardian's three star review praised director Dugald Bruce-Lockhart's "nifty production" and Johnson Willis's "stonking star turn". The play transferred to the Southwark Playhouse in March 2025 where it completed a sold out run and subsequently transferred to the west end for a month at the Leicester Square Theatre. It is due to complete a ten week national tour in late 2026. Maitland's show Maitland's play How to Survive Your Mother, based on the memoir of the same name, premiered at the King's Head Theatre in London on 23 October 2024.

== Other appearances ==
Maitland part funded Chris Morris's debut feature film Four Lions (2010) in which he has a cameo as a newsreader.

He also presented Profile and two series of Lyrical Journey, both for BBC Radio 4. The latter, which he devised, takes musicians to a place they have written a song about. They then perform it in front of people for whom it has special significance. The series featured songs by the Proclaimers, Squeeze and Billy Bragg.
