= Thatcher ministry =

Thatcher ministry may refer to:

- First Thatcher ministry, the British majority government led by Margaret Thatcher from 1979 to 1983
- Second Thatcher ministry, the British majority government led by Margaret Thatcher from 1983 to 1987
- Third Thatcher ministry, the British majority government led by Margaret Thatcher from 1987 to 1990

== See also ==
- List of ministers under Margaret Thatcher
- Premiership of Margaret Thatcher
- Shadow Cabinet of Margaret Thatcher
