= 1975 Conservative Party leadership election =

- 4–11 February 1975
- Registered: 276
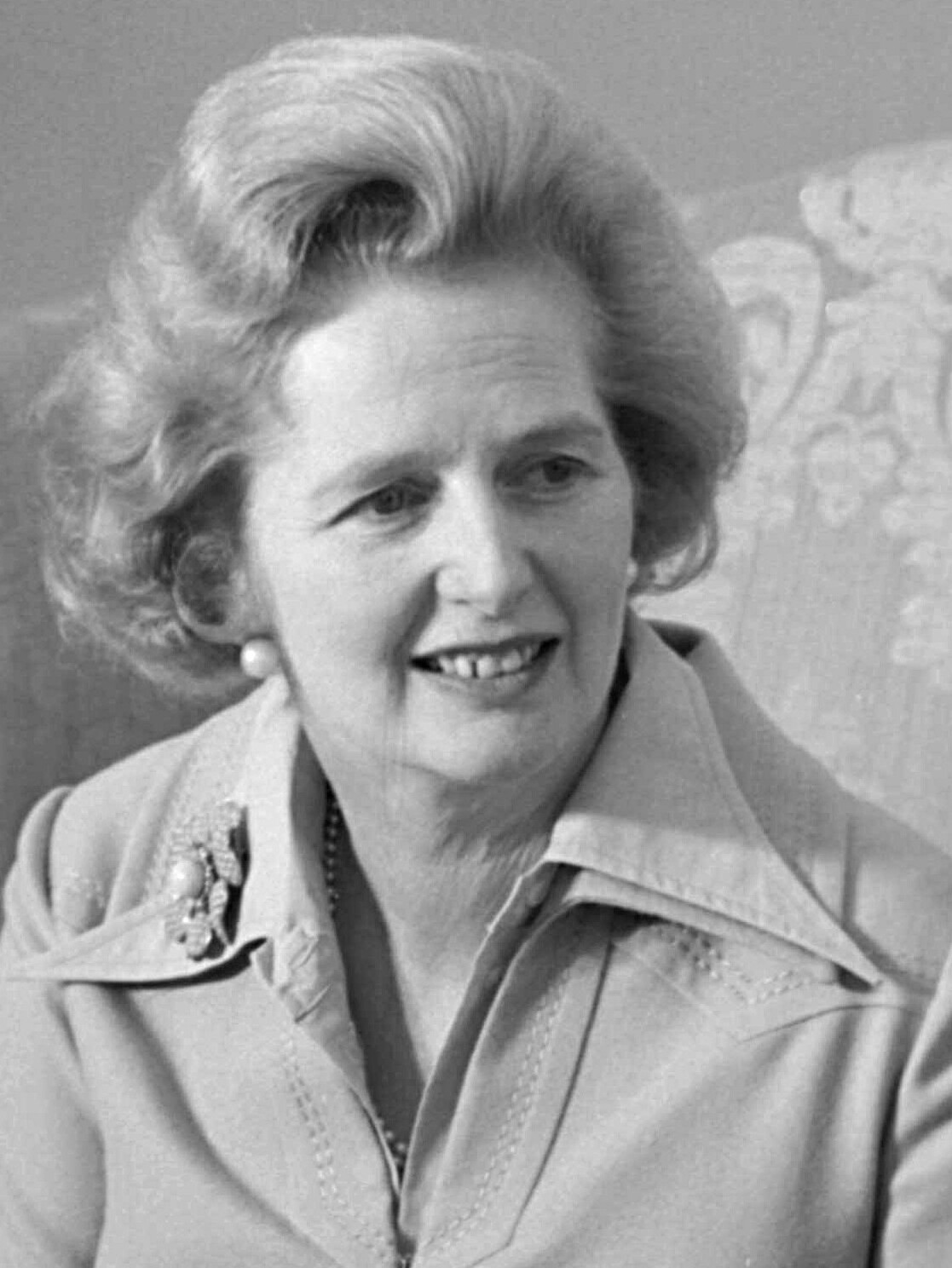

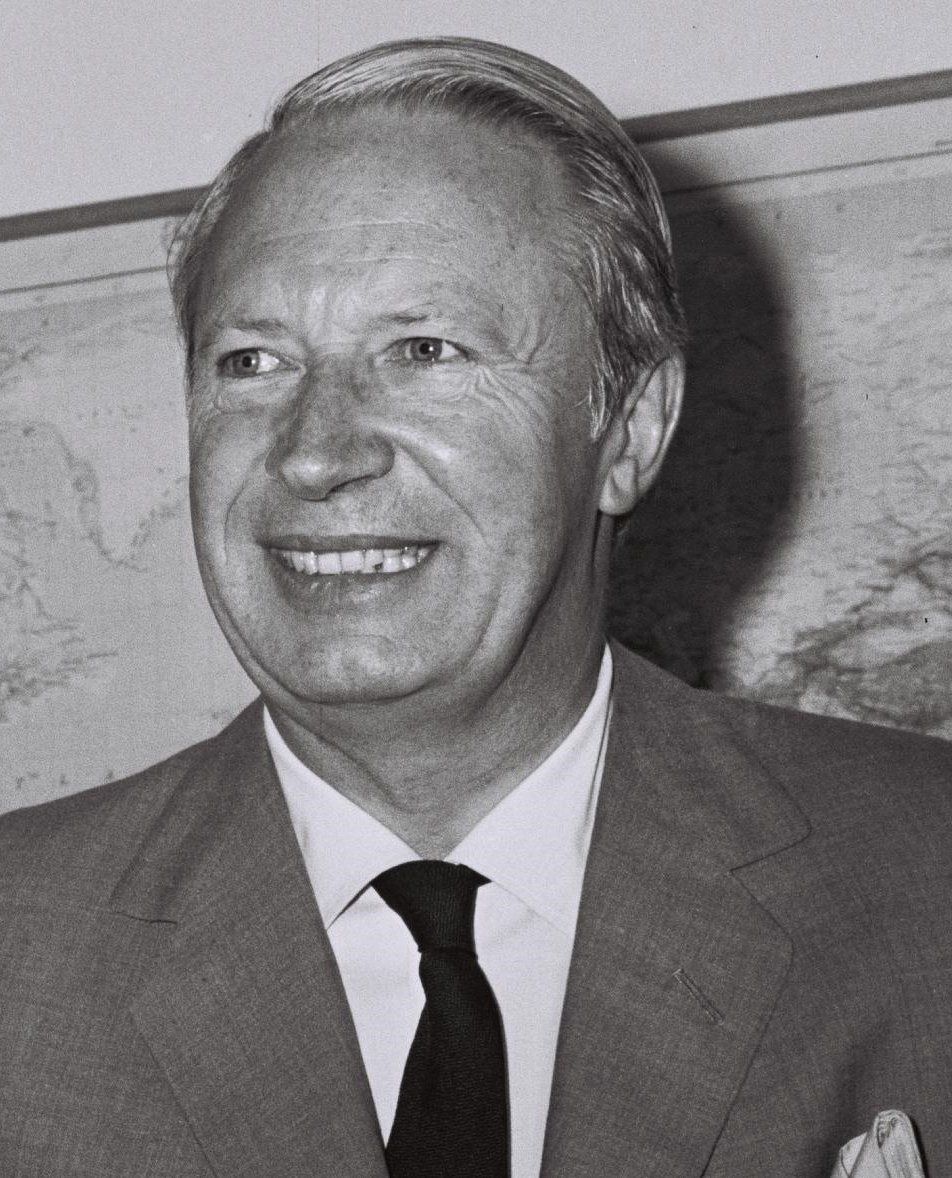

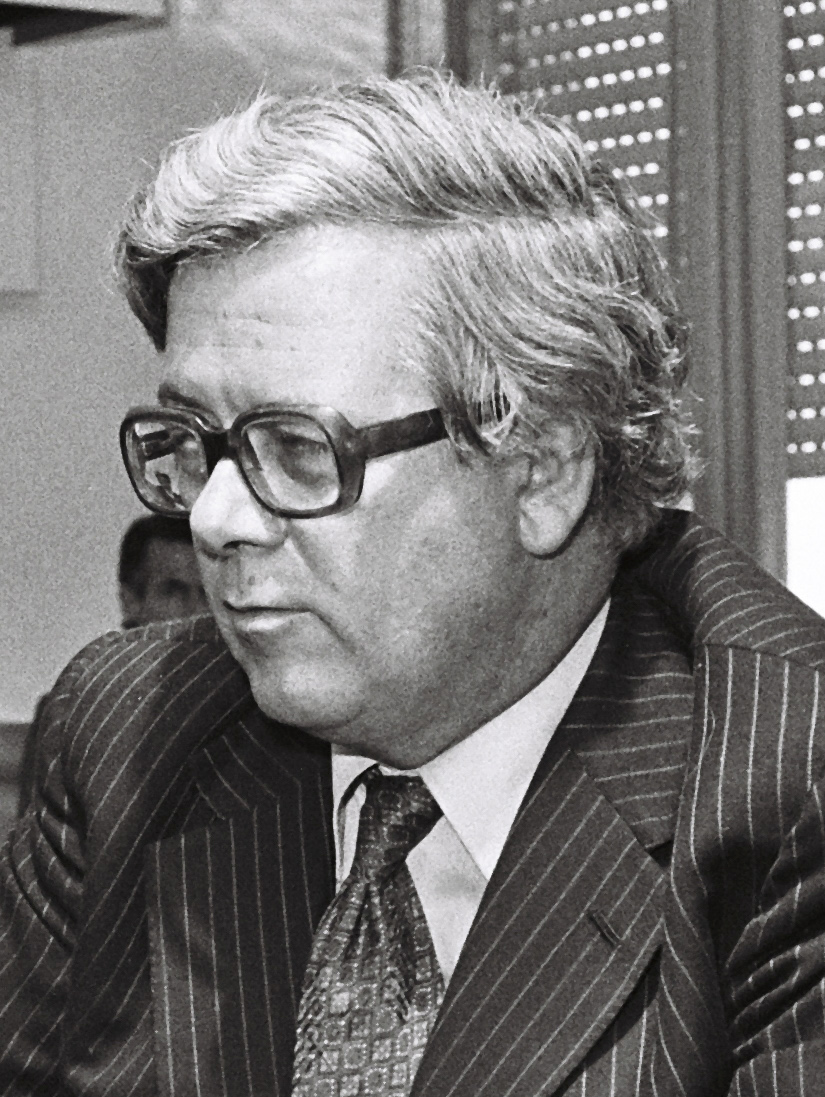
Candidate	Margaret Thatcher	Edward Heath	William Whitelaw
First ballot	130 (47.1%)	119 (43.1%)	Did not enter
Second ballot	146 (52.9%)	Withdrew	79 (28.6%)
Candidate	Geoffrey Howe	Jim Prior	Hugh Fraser
First ballot	Did not enter	Did not enter	16 (5.8%)
Second ballot	19 (6.9%)	19 (6.9%)	Did not enter
Leader before election
Edward Heath
Elected Leader
Margaret Thatcher

The 1975 Conservative Party leadership election was held in February 1975. The party's sitting MPs voted Margaret Thatcher as party leader on the second ballot. Incumbent leader Edward Heath stood aside after the first ballot, in which he unexpectedly finished behind Thatcher. The Conservatives were the official Opposition to the Labour government, so Thatcher also became Leader of the Opposition.

== Background ==
Edward Heath, leader of the Conservative Party and Prime Minister had called and unexpectedly lost the February 1974 general election. Although the Labour Party were able only to form a minority government, the following October 1974 general election saw them obtain a three-seat majority, and it was widely expected that Heath (who had led the party for the previous decade but lost three of the four general elections he contested) would not be leader of the party for much longer.

At that time the rules for electing a party leader only applied when the post was vacant and there was no way to challenge an incumbent. Heath faced many critics calling for either his resignation or a change in the rules for leadership elections to allow for a challenge. Heath eventually agreed with the 1922 Committee that there would be a review of the rules for leadership elections and subsequently he would put himself up for re-election.

A review was conducted under the auspices of Heath's predecessor Sir Alec Douglas-Home. Two recommendations were made, though neither was to make a difference in 1975 (although they would prove crucial in future years). The leader would henceforth be elected annually, whether the party was in opposition or government, in the period following a Queen's Speech, though in most years this would prove a formality. Also on the first round the requirement for a victorious candidate to have a lead of 15% over their nearest rival was modified so that this would now be 15% of the total number of MPs, not just those voting for candidates. This is what would ultimately deprive Margaret Thatcher of a majority in the first ballot in the leadership election held fifteen years later.

== First ballot ==
=== Candidates ===
==== Declared candidates ====
- Hugh Fraser, former Secretary of State for Air, Member of Parliament for Stafford
- Edward Heath, incumbent Leader of the Conservative Party, Member of Parliament for Sidcup
- Margaret Thatcher, Shadow Chief Secretary to the Treasury, Member of Parliament for Finchley

==== Potential candidates who declined to run ====
- Edward du Cann, Chairman of the 1922 Committee, Member of Parliament for Taunton
- Keith Joseph, Shadow Home Secretary, Member of Parliament for Leeds North East
- Jim Prior, Shadow Secretary of State for Employment, Member of Parliament for Lowestoft
- Peter Walker, Shadow Secretary of State for Defence, Member of Parliament for Worcester
- William Whitelaw, Chairman of the Conservative Party, Member of Parliament for Penrith and The Border

=== Campaign ===
Following the review, on 14 January 1975 Heath called a leadership election for 4 February, in order to assert his authority as leader of the party. Many expected the contest to be a walkover, believing there was no clear alternative to Heath after Keith Joseph had ruled himself out following controversial remarks calling on poor people to have fewer children and William Whitelaw had pledged loyalty to Heath. Many other shadow cabinet members pledged their support for Heath including Jim Prior, Peter Carrington, Leader in the House of Lords, and Robert Carr, Shadow Chancellor.

However, on 20 January Margaret Thatcher opted to stand, with Airey Neave as her campaign manager, as did backbencher Hugh Fraser. Even then many believed that Heath would win easily. Thatcher's support was seen as minimal, with all the Conservative daily newspapers backing Heath (although the weekly The Spectator backed Thatcher). As the election went on it became clear that the race was going to be much closer, as Thatcher became the clear candidate to be supported by discontented backbenchers. However, on the eve of the ballot a Heath win was still seen as likely, with The Glasgow Herald on the morning of the first vote noting that there seemed to be "no doubt last night that Mr Heath was running ahead of Mrs Margaret Thatcher, but it being unclear whether his opponents would deprive him of the 139 votes he needed to avoid a second ballot. At the same time it was reported that 8 out of 10 Conservative peers and a majority of constituency organisations supported Heath.

As Chairman of the 1922 Committee, Edward du Cann managed the election.

=== Result ===
The first ballot had the following result:

First ballot: 4 February 1975
Candidate	Votes	%
Margaret Thatcher	130	47.1
Edward Heath	119	43.1
Hugh Fraser	16	5.8
Abstention	11	4.0
Second ballot required

As a result of the first ballot, Fraser withdrew. Heath resigned, but another ballot was needed:

== Second ballot ==
=== Candidates ===
==== Declared candidates ====
- Geoffrey Howe, Shadow Secretary of State for Social Services, Member of Parliament for East Surrey
- John Peyton, Shadow Leader of the House of Commons, Member of Parliament for Yeovil
- Jim Prior, Shadow Secretary of State for Employment, Member of Parliament for Lowestoft
- Margaret Thatcher, Shadow Chief Secretary to the Treasury, Member of Parliament for Finchley
- William Whitelaw, Chairman of the Conservative Party, Member of Parliament for Penrith and The Border

==== Withdrawn ====
- Edward Heath, incumbent Leader of the Conservative Party, Member of Parliament for Sidcup

==== Potential candidates who declined to run ====
- Julian Amery, former Minister of State for Foreign Affairs, Member of Parliament for Brighton Pavilion
- Edward du Cann, Chairman of the 1922 Committee, Member of Parliament for Taunton
- Ian Gilmour, Shadow Secretary of State for Northern Ireland, Member of Parliament for Chesham and Amersham
- Maurice Macmillan, former Secretary of State for Employment, Member of Parliament for Farnham

=== Campaign ===
Following his defeat in the first ballot Heath asked Shadow Chancellor of the Exchequer Robert Carr to "take over the functions of leader" until a new leader was elected.

=== Result ===
Second ballot: 11 February 1975
Candidate	Votes	%
Margaret Thatcher	146	52.9
William Whitelaw	79	28.6
Geoffrey Howe	19	6.9
Jim Prior	19	6.9
John Peyton	11	4
Margaret Thatcher elected

49-year-old Thatcher became the first woman to be elected leader of a major British political party.
