= Douglas Hurd =

English politician (born 1930)

The Right Honourable The Lord Hurd of Westwell CH CBE PC
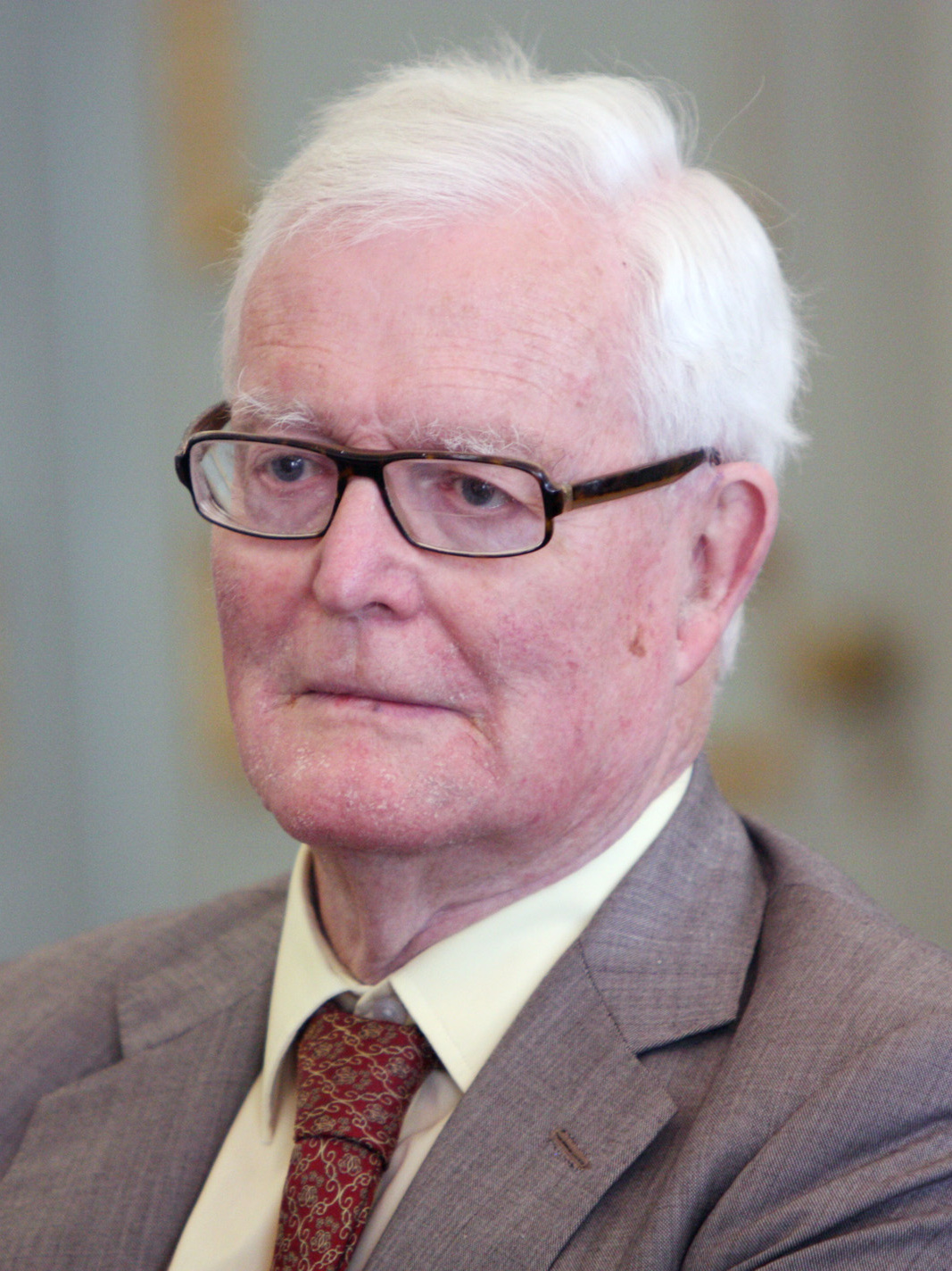
- Hurd in 2013

Secretary of State for Foreign and Commonwealth Affairs
- In office 26 October 1989 – 5 July 1995
- Prime Minister: Margaret Thatcher; John Major
- Preceded by: John Major
- Succeeded by: Malcolm Rifkind

Home Secretary
- In office 2 September 1985 – 26 October 1989
- Prime Minister: Margaret Thatcher
- Preceded by: Leon Brittan
- Succeeded by: David Waddington

Secretary of State for Northern Ireland
- In office 27 September 1984 – 2 September 1985
- Prime Minister: Margaret Thatcher
- Preceded by: Jim Prior
- Succeeded by: Tom King

Minister of State for the Home Office
- In office 9 June 1983 – 27 September 1984
- Prime Minister: Margaret Thatcher
- Preceded by: Patrick Mayhew
- Succeeded by: Giles Shaw

Minister of State for Europe
- In office 4 May 1979 – 9 June 1983
- Prime Minister: Margaret Thatcher
- Preceded by: Office established
- Succeeded by: Malcolm Rifkind
Parliamentary offices
Member of the House of Lords
Lord Temporal
Life peerage 13 June 1997 – 9 June 2016
Member of Parliament for Witney Mid Oxfordshire (Feb 1974–1983)
In office 28 February 1974 – 8 April 1997
Preceded by	Constituency established
Succeeded by	Shaun Woodward

Political Secretary to the Prime Minister
- In office 19 June 1970 – 4 March 1974
- Prime Minister: Edward Heath
- Preceded by: Marcia Falkender
- Succeeded by: Marcia Falkender

Personal details
- Born: Douglas Richard Hurd; 8 March 1930 (age 96) Marlborough, Wiltshire, England
- Party: Conservative
- Spouses: Tatiana Eyre (m. 1960; div. 1982) Judy Smart (m. 1982; died 2008)
- Children: 5, including Nick
- Parent(s): Anthony Hurd; Stephanie Frances Corner
- Relatives: Sir Percy Hurd (grandfather)
- Education: Eton College; Trinity College, Cambridge

Douglas Richard Hurd, Baron Hurd of Westwell (born 8 March 1930) is an English Conservative Party politician and author who served in the governments of Margaret Thatcher and John Major from 1979 to 1995.

A career diplomat and political secretary to Prime Minister Edward Heath, Hurd first entered Parliament in February 1974 as MP for the Mid Oxfordshire constituency (Witney from 1983). His first government post was as Minister for Europe from 1979 to 1983 (being that office's inaugural holder) and he served in several Cabinet roles from 1984 onwards, including Secretary of State for Northern Ireland (1984–85), Home Secretary (1985–89) and Foreign Secretary (1989–95). He stood unsuccessfully for the Conservative Party leadership in 1990, and retired from frontline politics during a Cabinet reshuffle in 1995.

In 1997, Hurd was elevated to the House of Lords and is one of the Conservative Party's most senior elder statesmen. He is a patron of the Tory Reform Group. He retired from the Lords in 2016.

== Early life ==
Order of the British Empire ribbon

Hurd was born in 1930 in the market town of Marlborough in Wiltshire. His father Anthony Hurd (later Lord Hurd) and grandfather Sir Percy Hurd were also Members of Parliament. Douglas attended Twyford School, Winchester, where he enjoyed reading the novels of John Buchan held in the library, and Eton College, where he was a King's Scholar and won the Newcastle Scholarship in 1947. He was also captain of school (head boy).

Following school Hurd did National Service, which he did not particularly enjoy, at a time when the Berlin Blockade made a Third World War seem far from unlikely. He began in July 1948 with a compulsory period in the ranks of the Royal Regiment of Artillery alongside young men of all social backgrounds. He later recorded that although living standards were no great shock after the spartan conditions at public school in those days, the petty dishonesty which he saw in the barrack room, and the waste of time which was so large a part of a conscript's experience, made him sceptical in later years of constituents' demands for a restoration of National Service. He was selected for officer training, attended Mons Officer Cadet School, Aldershot; from November 1948, and was commissioned as a second lieutenant in the 5th Regiment, Royal Horse Artillery (as it was then called) at the start of March 1949. He was released from the Army in September 1949 to take up his place at Cambridge University. He trained for a few weeks each summer as a reserve officer until 1952.

Hurd went up to Trinity College, Cambridge, in the autumn of 1949. He achieved an upper second (II:1) in his preliminary exams in summer 1950. In March 1951 he was approached by an admiral to be recruited to British Intelligence. He attended a selection panel, but withdrew from the process because, he later wrote, he did not want a career which would have to be pursued in secret. Hurd's brother Julian, who was on the officer training course at Aldershot at the time, committed suicide in June 1951. In his third year, Hurd served as chairman of the Cambridge University Conservative Association for Michaelmas (autumn) Term 1951 and president of the Cambridge Union Society in Easter (summer) Term 1952. His special subject for study was the Second French Republic. He graduated in 1952 with a first-class degree (BA) in history.

In 1952, Hurd joined the Diplomatic Service. He was posted to China, the United States and Italy, before leaving the service in 1966 to enter politics as a member of the Conservative Party.

== Member of Parliament ==
Hurd became private secretary (a political appointment, his salary paid by the Conservative Party) to Conservative Prime Minister Edward Heath, and was first elected to Parliament in February 1974 to represent the constituency of Mid Oxfordshire. Following his election, he was made a Commander of the Order of the British Empire in the February 1974 Dissolution Honours, gazetted on 2 April 1974. At the 1983 general election the seat was replaced by Witney and he remained MP for that seat until his retirement from the House of Commons in 1997 having served 23 years in Parliament. His immediate successor was Shaun Woodward, who defected to Labour in 1999, and moved in 2001 to a safe Labour seat, before serving as Northern Ireland Secretary, a position Hurd once held. From 2001 to 2016, Hurd's former constituency was represented by the former Leader of the Conservative Party and former British prime minister, David Cameron.

=== In government: 1979–1990 ===
Hurd was appointed Minister of State at the Foreign & Commonwealth Office upon the Conservative victory in the 1979 general election and remained in that post for the duration of the Parliament. Following the 1983 election Thatcher moved Hurd to the Home Office, but just over a year later he was promoted to Cabinet rank, succeeding Jim Prior as Secretary of State for Northern Ireland. In this position, his diplomatic skills paved the way for the signing of the Anglo-Irish Agreement on the future of Northern Ireland, which marked a turning point in British-Irish co-operation on the political situation in the troubled region. A month before the agreement was signed, however, Hurd returned to the Home Office, this time as Home Secretary, following the demotion of Leon Brittan to the Department of Trade and Industry.

Widely seen as a "safe pair of hands" and a solid, loyal member of the Cabinet, Hurd's tenure as Home Secretary was largely uncontroversial, although he was notably of the view that Her Majesty's Prison Service did not work effectively and argued for more rehabilitation of offenders and alternative sentencing.

Hurd brought in the Public Order Act, 1986, which created the crime of hate speech for speech which is "threatening, abusive or insulting" and which is spoken in public, with intent or likely to "stir up" racial hatred.

=== Candidature in the 1990 leadership election ===
Hurd's Cabinet career progressed further during the turbulent final months of Margaret Thatcher's prime ministership. On 26 October 1989, Hurd moved to the Foreign Office, succeeding John Major, whose rapid rise through the Cabinet saw him become Chancellor of the Exchequer in the wake of Nigel Lawson's resignation.

In mid-November 1990, Hurd supported Margaret Thatcher's candidature as Conservative Party leader against challenger Michael Heseltine, but on her withdrawal from the second round of the contest on 22 November, Hurd decided to enter the race as a moderate centre-right candidate, drawing on his reputation as a successful 'law-and-order' Home Secretary. He was endorsed by former Prime Minister and Conservative Party Leader Edward Heath. He was seen as an outsider, lagging behind the more charismatic Heseltine and the eventual winner, John Major, who shared the moderate centre-right political ground with Hurd but had the added advantages of youth and political momentum. Hurd's Etonian education may have also been a disadvantage. Years later, Hurd expressed frustration that his privileged background counted against him in the leadership election, commenting in an interview that "I should have said I am standing for leadership of the Tory party and not for some demented Marxist outfit". He came third, winning 56 of the 372 votes cast and, together with Heseltine, conceded defeat to allow Major, who had fallen just three votes short of an outright majority, to return unopposed and take over as prime minister on 27 November 1990. Hurd was gracious in defeat and, on the formation of Major's first Cabinet, was returned to his position as Foreign Secretary.

=== Foreign Secretary ===
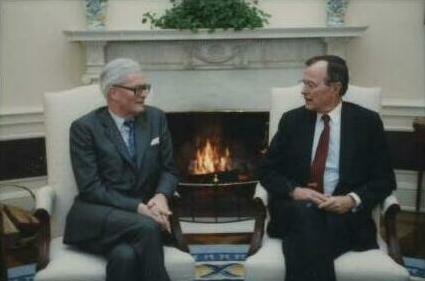
Hurd with President George H. W. Bush in 1991

Hurd was widely regarded as a statesmanlike British Foreign Secretary, his tenure having been particularly eventful. He oversaw Britain's diplomatic responses to the end of the Cold War and the collapse of the Soviet Union in 1991, as well as the first Gulf War to drive Ba'athist Iraqi troops out of Kuwait. Hurd cultivated good relations with the United States under President George H. W. Bush, and sought a more conciliatory approach to other members of the European Community, repairing relationships damaged during the increasingly Eurosceptic tone of Margaret Thatcher's final years. Hurd was a signatory of the Maastricht Treaty establishing the European Union in 1992. Hurd welcomed a reunified Germany into the European political community in 1990.

One of the defining features of Hurd's tenure as Foreign Secretary was the British reaction to the Yugoslav Wars. During the Bosnian War, Hurd was seen as a leading voice among European politicians arguing against sending military aid to the Bosniaks and for maintaining the arms embargo, in defiance of the line taken by US President Bill Clinton, and arguing that such a move would only create a 'level killing field' and prolong the conflict unduly. Hurd also resisted pressure to allow Bosnian refugees to enter into Britain arguing that to do so would reduce pressure on the Republic of Bosnia and Herzegovina to sue for peace. Hurd described his and British policy during that time as 'realist'.

Shortly after his withdrawal from frontline politics, Hurd travelled to Serbia and Montenegro to meet Slobodan Milošević on behalf of the British bank NatWest (see below), fuelling some speculation that Hurd had taken a pro-Serbian line. There has been criticism of Hurd's policies in relation to the war. The Bosnian government even threatened to charge Hurd as an accomplice to the Bosnian genocide before the War Tribunal at The Hague, though this came to nothing. In 2010 Hurd told a reporter that he was troubled by his Bosnia policy but still doubted that intervention would have brought about an earlier end to the war.

Hurd was involved in a public scandal concerning Britain's funding of a hydroelectric dam on the Pergau River in Malaysia, near the Thai border. Building work began in 1991 with money from the British foreign aid budget. Concurrently, the Malaysian government bought around £1 billion's worth of British-made arms. The suggested linkage of arms deals to aid became the subject of a UK Government inquiry from March 1994. In November 1994, after an application for judicial review brought by the World Development Movement, the High Court held that Hurd's actions as Foreign Secretary, in allocating £234 million towards the funding of the dam, were ultra vires [outside his legal powers and therefore unlawful], on the grounds that the legislation only empowered him to fund economically sound projects. In 1997, the administration of the UK's aid budget was removed from the Foreign Secretary's remit (previously the Overseas Development Administration had been under the supervision of the Foreign and Commonwealth Office). The new department, the Department for International Development (DFID), had its own Secretary of State who was a member of the Cabinet.

In 1995, during the Cabinet reshuffle widely seen as setting up the Conservative team which would contest the next election, Hurd retired from frontline politics after 11 years in the Cabinet and was replaced by Malcolm Rifkind.

=== Retirement ===
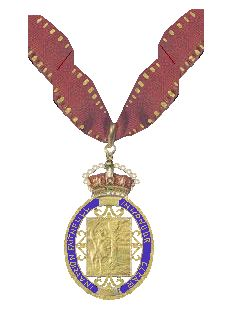
Insignia of a Member of the Order of the Companions of Honour

After his retirement as foreign secretary, Hurd remained a key supporter of John Major, and kept a range of active political involvements as well as taking on some business appointments, most notably as a deputy chairman of NatWest Markets and a board director of NatWest Group, posts he held from October 1995–99.

Hurd left the House of Commons at the 1997 general election, and on 13 June 1997 was created Baron Hurd of Westwell, of Westwell in the County of Oxfordshire, which enabled him to continue sitting in Parliament as a member of the House of Lords. He retired from the Lords on 9 June 2016.

In December 1997, Hurd was appointed chairman of British Invisibles (now renamed International Financial Services London or IFSL). He was chairman of the judging panel for the 1998 Booker Prize for Fiction. He became a member of the Royal Commission on the Reform of the House of Lords in February 1999, and in September 1999 he was appointed High Steward of Westminster Abbey, reflecting his long active membership of the Church of England. He later went on to chair the Hurd Commission which produced a review of the roles and functions of the Archbishop of Canterbury.

Hurd is chairman of the advisory council at FIRST, an international affairs organisation. Hurd was appointed Commander of the Order of the British Empire in 1974 and Member of the Order of the Companions of Honour in the 1996 New Year Honours. He was formerly a Visiting Fellow, and is now an Honorary Fellow, of Nuffield College, Oxford and was Chairman of the German British Forum until March 2005. On 17 July 2009, he received the honorary degree of Doctor of Letters (Hon DLitt) from Aston University at its Degree Congregation.

Hurd is a member of the Top Level Group of UK Parliamentarians for Multilateral Nuclear Disarmament and Non-proliferation, established in October 2009.

== Personal life ==
Hurd has married twice. In 1960, he married his first wife Tatiana, daughter of Major Arthur Eyre MBE, and their union produced three sons. The couple separated in 1976, and divorced in 1982. Tatiana Hurd cited her husband's career as the reason for their separation, saying, "Really, politics don't mix with marriage". In 1982 Hurd married Judy Smart, his former parliamentary secretary, who was 19 years his junior. They had two children, a boy and a girl. Judy Hurd died of leukaemia on 22 November 2008 in an Oxford hospital, aged 58.

Hurd's eldest son, Nick Hurd, was Conservative Member of Parliament for Ruislip Northwood and Pinner from May 2005 to December 2019. In 2010, he was appointed Minister for Civil Society and married Lady Clare Kerr, daughter of the Marquess of Lothian.

Hurd's second son, Thomas, joined the diplomatic service. His name appeared on a list of suspected MI6 operatives which was published on the Internet, along with the name of Douglas himself. The Hon. Thomas Hurd was appointed OBE in 2006, and is married with five children. His wife, Catherine, known as Sian, died on 21 May 2011, after falling from the roof of the building where they lived on East 84th Street in New York City.

In 1988, Hurd set up the charity Crime Concern. Crime Concern worked to reduce crime, anti-social behaviour and the fear of crime, by working with young people, their families and adult offenders, offering opportunities through training and employment. Crime Concern merged with young people's charity Rainer in 2008 to become Catch22. Hurd is fluent in Mandarin, French, and Italian.

== Literary works ==
Hurd is a writer of political thrillers including:

- Send Him Victorious (1968, with Andrew Osmond)
- The Smile on the Face of the Tiger (1969, with Andrew Osmond)
- Scotch on the Rocks (1971, with Andrew Osmond)
- Truth Game (1972)
- A Vote to a Kill (1975)
- Palace of Enchantments (1985, with Stephen Lamport)
- The Shape of Ice (1998)
- Image in the Water (2001)
- 10 Minutes to Turn the Devil (2015), a collection of short stories.

His non-fiction works include:

- The Arrow War: An Anglo-Chinese Confusion 1856-1860 (1967)
- An End To Promises: Sketch of a Government 1970-74 (1979)
- The Search for Peace: A Century of Peace Diplomacy (1997)
- Memoirs (2003)
- Robert Peel: A Biography (2007)
- Choose your Weapons: The British Foreign Secretary (2010)
- Disraeli: or, The Two Lives (2013, with Edward Young)
- Elizabeth II: The Steadfast (2015), the 'Penguin Monarchs' series.

== See also ==
- Thatcher Ministry (1979–1990) and Major Ministry (1990–1997), Governments in which Hurd served
- Order of the Companions of Honour
- List of political families in the United Kingdom
- Tory Reform Group
- British-American Parliamentary Group
- Margaret (2009 film)

Government offices
Preceded by Marcia Falkender	Political Secretary to the Prime Minister; 1970–1974	Succeeded by Tom McNally
Parliament of the United Kingdom
New constituency	Member of Parliament for Mid Oxfordshire; 1974–1983	Constituency abolished
New constituency	Member of Parliament for Witney; 1983–1997	Succeeded by Shaun Woodward
Political offices
New title	Minister for Europe; 1979–1983	Succeeded by Malcolm Rifkind
Preceded by Jim Prior	Secretary of State for Northern Ireland; 1984–1985	Succeeded by Tom King
Preceded by Leon Brittan	Home Secretary; 1985–1989	Succeeded by David Waddington
Preceded by John Major	Foreign Secretary; 1989–1995	Succeeded by Malcolm Rifkind
Orders of precedence in the United Kingdom
Preceded by The Lord Alton of Liverpool	Gentlemen; Baron Hurd of Westwell	Followed by The Lord Baker of Dorking
