= 1990 Conservative Party leadership election =

British leadership election to replace Margaret Thatcher

- 20–27 November 1990

All 372 Conservative MPs Majority of 56 votes needed to win
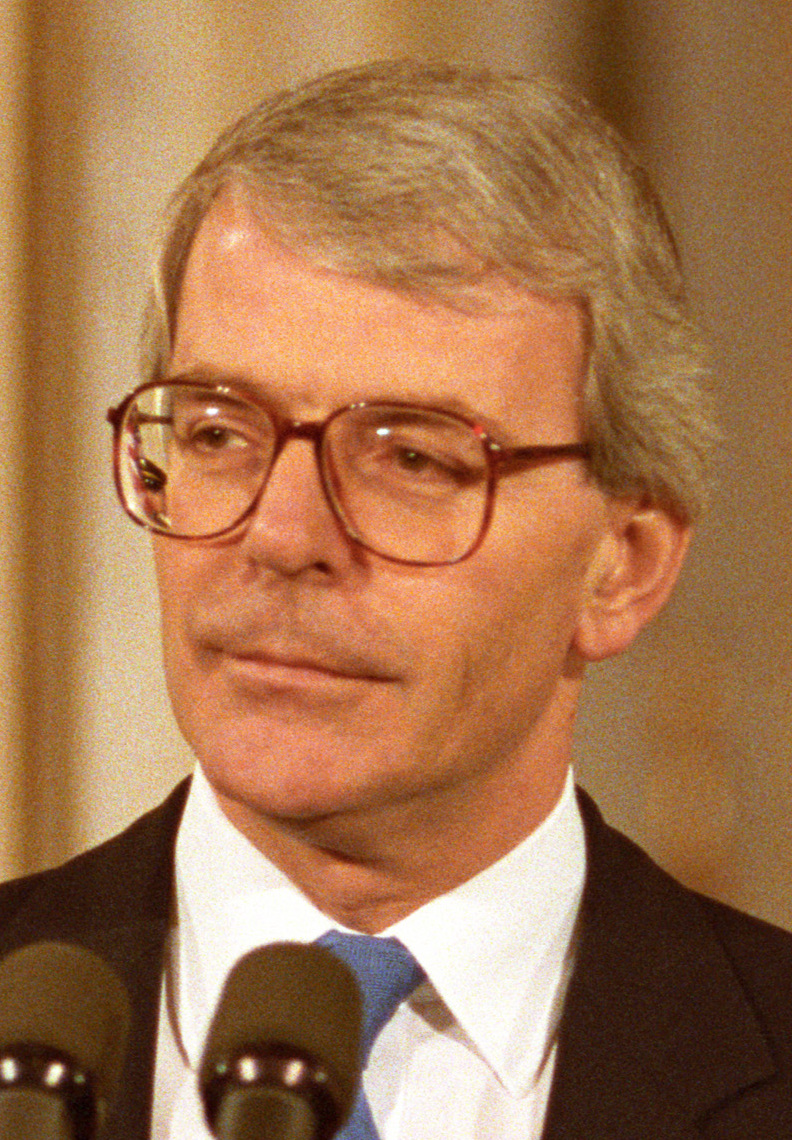

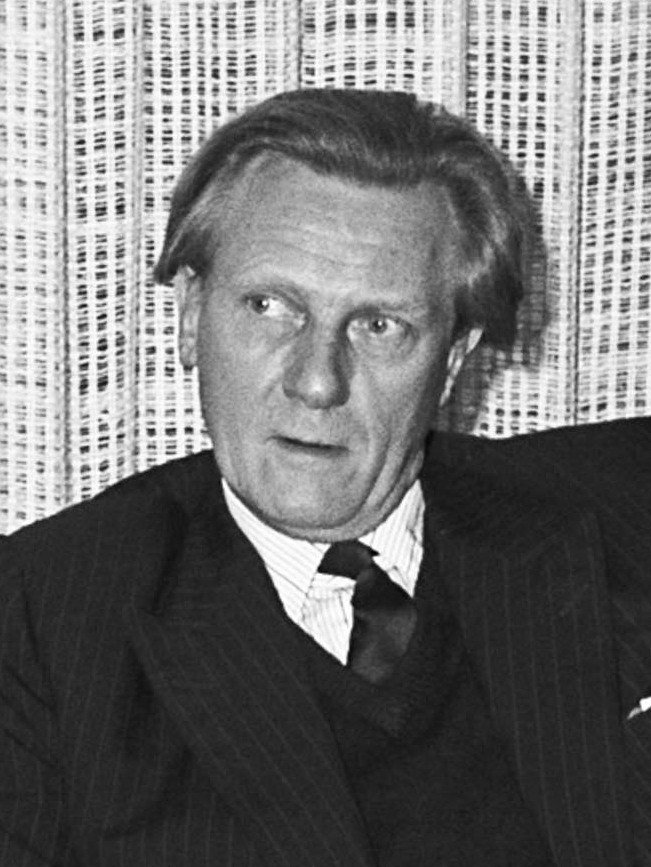

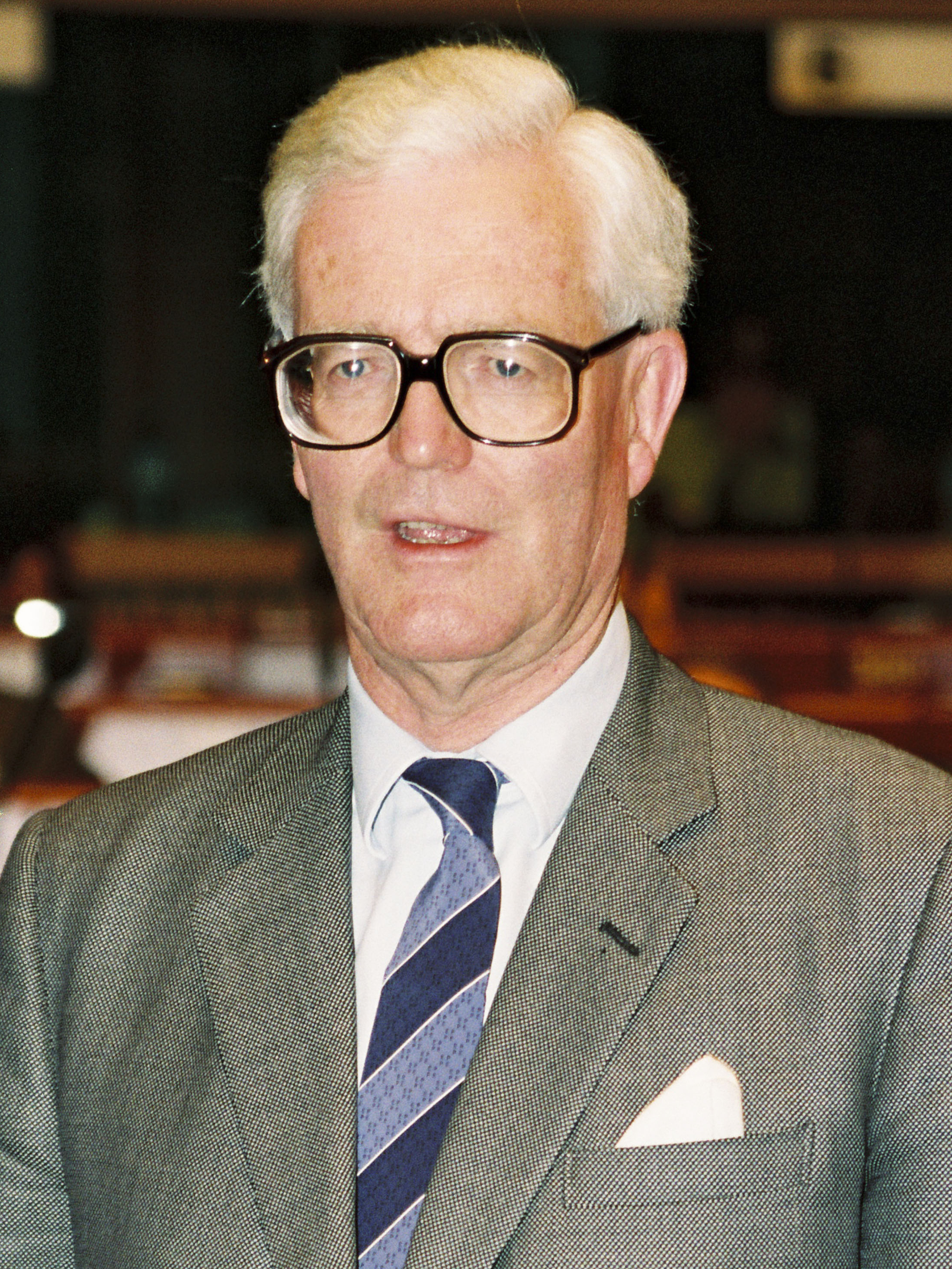

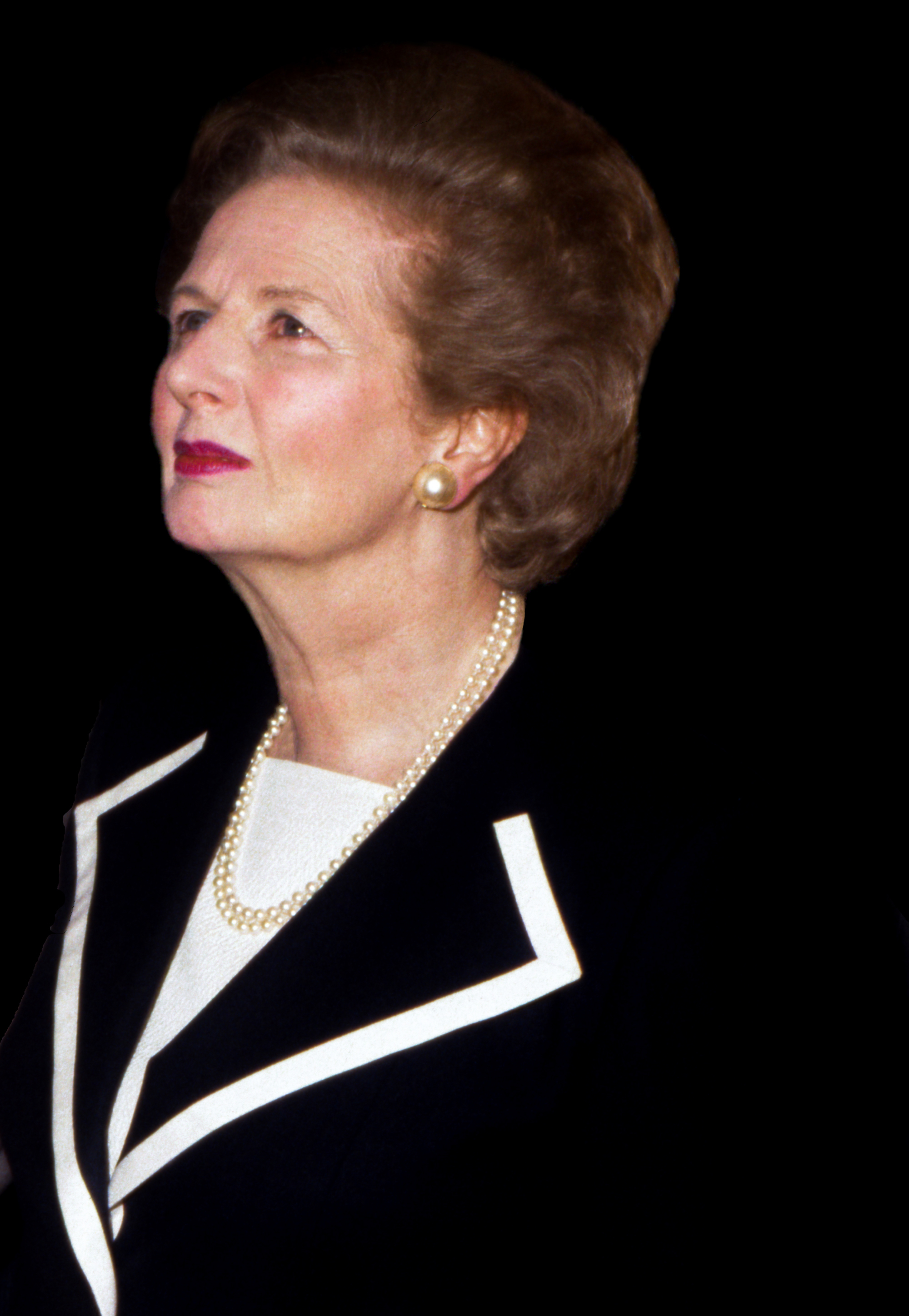
Candidate	John Major	Michael Heseltine
First ballot	Did not enter	152 (40.9%)
Second ballot	185 (49.7%)	131 (35.2%)
Third ballot	Unopposed	Withdrew
Candidate	Douglas Hurd	Margaret Thatcher
First ballot	Did not enter	204 (54.8%)
Second ballot	56 (15.1%)	Withdrew
Third ballot	Withdrew	Withdrew
Leader before election
Margaret Thatcher
Elected Leader
John Major

The 1990 Conservative Party leadership election was called on 14 November 1990 following the decision of Michael Heseltine, former defence and environment secretary, to challenge Margaret Thatcher, the incumbent Prime Minister of the United Kingdom, for leadership of the Conservative Party.

In the months leading up to the election, Thatcher's position was slipping due to her increasingly divisive and confrontational approach in the United Kingdom. Her Community Charge had proven to be highly unpopular and resulted in widespread riots across the country, while her Euroscepticism had begun to become a detriment to the Conservatives. The economy, which was booming, had started to enter the early stages of a recession due to high inflation. The tipping point came in October when Thatcher strongly refused the European Economic Community's plans for further integration, prompting her longest serving minister Geoffrey Howe to resign. Immediately following his resignation, Heseltine challenged Thatcher to a contest in November.

Thatcher failed to win outright on the first ballot, missing the threshold by just four votes, and was persuaded to withdraw from the second round of voting to avoid a potential defeat. She announced her pending resignation on 22 November 1990, ending more than fifteen years as Conservative leader on 27 November 1990 and eleven years as prime minister on 28 November 1990.

== Background to the contest ==
Discontent with Margaret Thatcher's leadership of the Conservative Party had been growing over the latter years of her tenure, particularly following the Westland affair. There were differences within the Cabinet over Thatcher's perceived intransigence in her approach to the European Economic Community. In particular, many leading Conservatives wanted the United Kingdom to join the European Exchange Rate Mechanism (ERM), a move which Thatcher did not favour. In June 1989, the then-Foreign Secretary Geoffrey Howe and Chancellor of the Exchequer Nigel Lawson forced Thatcher to agree to the "Madrid Conditions", namely that Britain would eventually join the ERM "when the time was right". In July 1989, Thatcher retaliated by removing Howe from the Foreign Office, while making him Deputy Prime Minister (in theory a promotion but in reality removing him from a key post).

Whereas Thatcher had presided over an economic boom at the time of her third general election victory in 1987, by the autumn of 1989 interest rates had to be raised to 15% to cool inflation, which was now pushing 10%. Rates would remain at that level until October 1990. Lawson, who had clashed with Thatcher over "shadowing the Deutsche Mark" early in 1988, resigned as Chancellor in October 1989, unable to accept Thatcher publicly taking independent advice from the economist Alan Walters. The beneficiary was John Major, little known to the public hitherto, who had briefly been promoted to succeed Howe as foreign secretary in July before succeeding Lawson as Chancellor in October, putting him in pole position to succeed Thatcher.

In December 1989, Thatcher was challenged for the leadership for the first time since her election to that position in 1975, by the little known 69-year-old backbench MP Sir Anthony Meyer. Thatcher faced no serious threat of losing to this stalking horse challenger, but her political credibility was undermined by the fact that 60 members of the parliamentary Conservative party had not supported her, 33 voting for Meyer, 24 spoiling their ballot papers, and three not voting at all. The non-voters were reported by the next day's Glasgow Herald to include Michael Heseltine, with the same newspaper ominously reporting that Heseltine's supporters predicted that unless the Prime Minister changed "her style of leadership", she would "be on her way out next year".

Throughout 1990, the popularity both of Thatcher and her Conservative government waned considerably. The introduction of the deeply unpopular Community Charge (which opponents branded the "poll tax") had been greeted with widespread opposition (one poll showed 78% opposed the scheme), including large-scale organised nonpayment and violent civil unrest. The opposition Labour Party had led in most of opinion polls since mid-1989, and at the height of the poll tax controversy, some indicated Labour support above 50%, a lead of more than twenty points over the Conservatives. Though the Conservatives still had a working majority of more than 100 seats, elections were due by the autumn of 1992 at the latest, which put a sense of relative urgency behind the efforts to force Thatcher out. Local elections in May brought another bruising loss, further undermining the government’s credibility and instilling a sense of electoral doom in many Conservatives. Moreover, by late 1990 the economy was in the first stages of recession; this, combined with lingering animosity over the poll tax issue and the fact that Labour was stubbornly holding on to its double-digit lead in the polls, made it clear to an increasing number of Conservative MPs (particularly the so-called wets, a group of moderates who were no friends of Thatcher to begin with) that the party was on course for a spectacular defeat in 1992 if the government did not radically change course.

On the international front, European leaders were discussing merging Europe's currencies to form a single currency, a move which the ever-Eurosceptic Thatcher did not favour, and in June Major suggested that this should be a "hard ECU", competing for use against existing national currencies; this idea was not in the end adopted. In October 1990, Major and the Foreign Secretary, Douglas Hurd, forced a reluctant Thatcher to agree to bring the UK into the exchange rate mechanism.

== Howe's resignation triggers contest ==
By October things had reached a fever pitch. In her Party Conference Speech early in that month, Thatcher mocked the Liberal Democrats' new "bird" logo in language lifted from the famous Monty Python "Dead Parrot sketch". Only days later, the Liberal Democrats took a seat from the Conservatives at the Eastbourne by-election. The defeat only reinforced the fear that the Conservatives could lose the next election due in eighteen months. On 30 October, Thatcher spoke out firmly in the House of Commons against the vision of European integration, including a single currency, espoused by the European Commission under Jacques Delors at the recent Rome Summit, characterising it as the path to a federal Europe and declaring that her response to such a vision would be "No! No! No!" This led to the resignation of Howe as deputy prime minister on 1 November. However, Howe did not make his resignation speech immediately, because he had temporarily lost his voice.

Heseltine, a moderate and pro-EU former minister, had resigned from the Cabinet over the Westland affair in January 1986 and had been conducting himself as a sort of intra-party opposition leader, critical of Thatcher's leadership, ever since. He now wrote a six-page public letter to his local Association chairman, calling for more regard for the wide range of opinions in the party before leaving for a trip to the Middle East. His Association officers sent him a 97-word reply on 5 November saying that they supported Thatcher's leadership. The party's regional agent had been present at their meeting, although they insisted he had not interfered with their reply. At about the same time, Thatcher's press secretary Bernard Ingham briefed journalists that Heseltine had "lit the blue touch paper then retired", although he denied having demanded that Heseltine "put up (that is, challenge Thatcher for the leadership) or shut up"; Heseltine was also taunted along similar lines by right-wing press, including the Daily Mail and The Times. Thatcher brought the annual leadership election forward by a fortnight.

At the Lord Mayor's Banquet on 12 November, Thatcher dismissed Howe's resignation by employing a cricketing metaphor:

I am still at the crease, though the bowling has been pretty hostile of late. And in case anyone doubted it, can I assure you there will be no ducking the bouncers, no stonewalling, no playing for time. The bowling's going to get hit all round the ground. That is my style.

The next day, 13 November, Howe made his resignation speech from the backbenches, addressing his dismay at Thatcher's approach and responding to her recent cricketing metaphor by employing one of his own. Explaining how, in his opinion, her approach made it hard for British ministers to negotiate for Britain's interests in Europe, he declared:

It is rather like sending your opening batsmen to the crease only for them to find, the moment the first balls are bowled, that their bats have been broken before the game by the team captain.

Howe's dramatic speech received cheers from the opposition benches and reinforced the change in general perception of Thatcher from the "Iron Lady" to a divisive and confrontational figure. The next morning, 14 November, Heseltine reappeared to announce that he would challenge her for the leadership of the party.

== Contest rules ==
The rules for Conservative leadership elections had been introduced for the first such election in 1965, and modified in 1975, the occasion of Thatcher's own victory over the incumbent leader Edward Heath. There would be a series of ballots of Conservative MPs, conducted by the 1922 Committee, with that committee's chairman, Cranley Onslow, as Returning Officer.

To win in the first round, as Thatcher had done one year before, a candidate needed not just to win an absolute majority, but also to have a lead over the runner-up of 15% of the total electorate (not just those who actually voted, as had been the case until the 1975 review, but including those who abstained or spoiled their ballot papers). There were 372 Conservative MPs in November 1990 (taking into account by-election losses since 376 Conservative MPs had been elected in the June 1987 general election). Therefore, a majority of at least 56 votes was required.

If no candidate achieved a sufficient majority, nominations would be re-opened, so new candidates could come forward, and a second ballot would take place one week later, at which only an absolute majority would be required. If necessary, the top three candidates from the second round would then go forward to a third and final round held under the alternative vote system.

Many speculated that if Thatcher did not achieve outright victory in the first round, she would either be forced to step down (opening up the field to her supporters who had previously been prevented from standing by their personal loyalty) or else might suffer further challenges from heavyweight figures. Although Heseltine was a serious leadership contender in his own right, many saw him (correctly, as it turned out) as a "stalking horse" like Meyer in 1989, who might weaken Thatcher only to pave the way for victory by a new candidate in a later round.

== First ballot ==
Heseltine was proposed by Neil Macfarlane (who had been a leading Thatcher backer in the 1975 contest) and Peter Tapsell. His campaign was run by Keith Hampson, Michael Mates and Peter Temple-Morris. He proposed a complete review of the poll tax but rejected Thatcher's proposal of a referendum on British membership of the mooted single European currency. Thatcher gave an interview to The Times in which she attacked his corporatist views, which made her appear extreme. Heseltine canvassed hard around Parliament whilst Thatcher was away at the Fontainebleau summit.

The first ballot in the election took place on Tuesday 20 November 1990. Thatcher herself was still in France on the night of the election and therefore voted by proxy, perhaps anticipating a better result than she actually achieved.

First ballot: 20 November 1990
Candidate	Votes	%
Margaret Thatcher	204	54.8
Michael Heseltine	152	40.9
Abstentions	16	4.3
Majority	52	14.0
Turnout	372	100
Second ballot required

Although Thatcher had obtained a clear majority, she was four votes short of the required 15% margin, so the election had to move to a second ballot. Thatcher gave a short statement in Paris following the announcement of the result, declaring that she intended to contest the second ballot, and on her return to London the following morning declared, "I fight on; I fight to win".

After the first ballot result the Heseltine team boasted of momentum, which was tactically foolish in the view of his biographer Michael Crick. He argues that they should have encouraged Thatcher to remain in the contest by downplaying Heseltine's support, much as the then-challenger Thatcher and her campaign manager Airey Neave had done prior to the first ballot of the 1975 contest.

Hurd and Major pledged their support for Thatcher, as did Cecil Parkinson, Kenneth Baker and ex-Cabinet minister Nicholas Ridley. Norman Tebbit, another ex-Cabinet minister, was part of her campaign team, along with John Wakeham. Thatcher's campaign manager, Peter Morrison, advised her to consult Cabinet members one by one on 21 November. Cabinet ministers had decided before consulting Thatcher the line they would each take: though they would support her in the second ballot, they thought that she would lose. Peter Lilley, William Waldegrave, John Gummer and Chris Patten stuck to this line. Kenneth Clarke, the Secretary of State for Education, became the first of her ministers to advise her that she could not win but that he could support her as prime minister for another five or ten years. Malcolm Rifkind said she would not win and was unsure whether he could support her in the second ballot. Peter Brooke said he would support Thatcher whatever she chose to do and that she could win "with all guns blazing". Michael Howard doubted whether she could win but said he would campaign vigorously for her.

Thatcher therefore decided to withdraw her candidacy on the morning of 22 November 1990 (she remained in office as Prime Minister until the election had been concluded). As a result of this, two further candidates allowed themselves to be nominated: Hurd and Major.

== Second ballot ==
The Cabinet agreed that if Heseltine became party leader, it would divide the party even further; and that one of its present members should succeed Thatcher. The only Cabinet member to endorse Heseltine for the second ballot was the Welsh Secretary, David Hunt, who had not been party to the agreement as he had been away in Tokyo. Four junior ministers openly backed Heseltine: the Welsh Office ministers Wyn Roberts and Ian Grist, and David Trippier and David Leigh. Heseltine was also endorsed by a number of senior ex-ministers including: Howe, Lawson, Lord Carrington (who as a peer had no vote), Peter Walker, David Howell, Ian Gilmour, Norman Fowler, Geoffrey Rippon, Jim Prior, Norman St John-Stevas and Paul Channon, but he had less support among younger MPs amongst whom he had done little to canvass support. Heseltine's campaign chairman Michael Mates was away for five days in the Middle East with the Defence Select Committee, of which he was chairman, so Heseltine's campaign did not have the cohesion of Major's, which was run by Norman Lamont. Heseltine's supporters, besides being older than those of the other candidates, tended to be pro-Europeans with a few populist backbenchers like David Evans, Tony Marlow and John Wilkinson.

Heseltine, a self-made multi-millionaire, was photographed at his country mansion Thenford House, Northamptonshire, which played poorly when set beside the stress which Major placed on his humble origins in Brixton. Major was soon seen as having the potential to lead the Conservatives to another consecutive general election victory; especially after he matched Heseltine's pledge to review the poll tax. Although ordinary members did not then have a vote in party leadership elections, they made their views known: 485 local Conservative Associations backed Major, whilst only 65 backed Heseltine and 22 backed Hurd. Several MPs who backed Heseltine later faced attempts to deselect them as candidates. Thatcher lobbied hard, urging MPs who supported her to vote for Major. Hurd's Eton College education was a disadvantage, twenty-five years after Iain Macleod's allegation of an Etonian "magic circle" conspiracy. Around a third of the Conservative parliamentary party were the "payroll vote", ministers and PPSs, who could normally be expected to support the official line in votes.

The second round of voting took place on Tuesday 27 November 1990.

Second ballot: 27 November 1990
Candidate	Votes	%
John Major	185	49.7
Michael Heseltine	131	35.2
Douglas Hurd	56	15.1
Majority	54	14.5
Turnout	372	100
Third ballot required

Major, seen as relatively new blood in the government, secured a commanding lead (although with fewer votes than Thatcher had obtained in the first ballot) of 185 votes to Heseltine's 131 votes and Hurd's 56.

Researchers later found that around twenty MPs had voted for Thatcher in the first ballot then for Heseltine in the second. However, around thirty of Heseltine's first ballot supporters, including Jerry Hayes and David Mellor, had switched to Major, and about ten, including Steven Norris, had switched to Hurd, for a net loss of twenty-one votes.

== Third ballot ==
Major was two votes short of an overall majority. Under the rules then in force, a third and final round was to be held on 29 November 1990. The third round was open to the top three candidates from the second round, thus none of the second round contenders were automatically eliminated. Had all three candidates opted to continue, the final round would have been conducted using the alternative vote.

Nevertheless, within minutes of the second round result being announced, both Heseltine and Hurd withdrew from the election in Major's favour. It was therefore announced by the Chairman of the 1922 Committee, Cranley Onslow, that no voting would be necessary and that Major was elected unopposed.

Third ballot: 29 November 1990 (scheduled)
Candidate	Votes	%
John Major	Unopposed	N/A
Major elected Leader

== Reaction ==
The Sun, a firm supporter of Thatcher and her party since her election campaign in 1979, marked her resignation with the front-page headline "MRS T-EARS" on 23 November 1990, in reference to her breaking down in tears in front of her ministers after announcing her resignation. The accompanying photo also showed her in tears whilst being driven away from 10 Downing Street.

Labour opposition leader Neil Kinnock (whose party had been ascendant in the opinion polls since the announcement of the poll tax more than a year earlier) described Thatcher's resignation as "good, very, very good indeed" and called for an immediate general election.

Henry Kissinger rang Downing Street "in a very emotional state" saying her decision to resign was "worse than a death in the family" and, according to notes by Charles Powell, "Gorbachev had sent Shevardnadze [his foreign minister] out of a high level meeting in the Kremlin to telephone him, to find out what on earth was going on and how such a thing could be conceivable. The ambassador said that he had indeed found it very hard to explain. Indeed, there was a certain irony. Five years ago they had party coups in the Soviet Union and elections in Britain. Now it seemed to be the other way round".

== Outcome ==
Major was declared the leader of the party on the evening of Tuesday 27 November 1990. Following Thatcher's formal resignation as prime minister, Queen Elizabeth II invited Major to form a government the next day. Hurd was re-appointed as foreign secretary and Heseltine returned to the Cabinet as environment secretary, a post he had held in the early 1980s. Both Hurd and Heseltine remained key figures during the Major government, Heseltine eventually rising to become deputy prime minister in 1995.

Major's premiership began well, and he was credited with restoring a consensual style of Cabinet government after the years of forceful leadership under Thatcher. The success of the First Gulf War in early 1991 contributed to strong public support. He secured some foreign policy successes in Europe, negotiating the Maastricht Treaty after securing an opt-out from the Social Chapter and the single currency, and he sprung a surprise victory in the 1992 election, albeit with a significantly reduced majority of only 21 seats.

Nevertheless, the political tides soon turned. The Major government's reputation for economic competence was destroyed by Britain's ejection from the ERM in September 1992. A notable protest came from Thatcher's former cabinet minister Norman Tebbit at the 1992 Party Conference, that the Conservatives had been wrong to ignore Thatcher's wishes to stay out (whether Britain entered the ERM at too high an exchange rate has been debated ever since). Apart from brief periods during fuel protests in 2000 and then following the 2003 invasion of Iraq, the Conservatives would not again enjoy an opinion poll lead until following the election of David Cameron as leader in 2005. The ongoing rebellion in the first half of 1993 by Conservative backbenchers against the passage of the Maastricht Treaty through the House of Commons was also deeply damaging to the government. Many of the Maastricht rebels were Thatcher supporters, and one of them, Teresa Gorman, devoted the opening chapter of her memoir of the incident to an account of the 1990 leadership contest.

The massive Conservative defeat in 1997 at the hands of Tony Blair and New Labour was thus attributable, at least in part, to the perception of internal division over Europe which had first been exposed by the 1990 leadership election. The Conservatives would not achieve the most seats in another general election until 2010, under Cameron, and would not win a large majority again until 2019, more than three decades after last doing so in 1987.

== Popular culture ==
The leadership contest was the subject of the 1991 TV movie Thatcher: The Final Days.

== See also ==
- 1992 United Kingdom general election
