= Cynthia Crawford =

Margaret Thatcher's personal assistant

Cynthia Margaret Crawford is the former personal assistant to Margaret Thatcher. Born in Powys, she was a member of the local Conservative party in Finchley, and later helped run Thatcher's household throughout the latter's tenure as Prime Minister of the United Kingdom, acting as her confidante. She was known as "Crawfie" to the Thatchers.

== Career ==
Crawford began her career as a secretary before being hired by Thatcher family in 1978. Crawford has given several interviews about her experiences, including details of Thatcher's fondness for drinking spirits late at night and her use of B12 injections. According to Crawford, Thatcher believed that whisky kept her alert, saying "Dear, you cannot drink gin and tonic in the middle of the night. You must have whisky to give you energy."

Thatcher told Crawford about her first meeting with then-governor Ronald Reagan, shortly after she had become Conservative party leader. Reagan had told her that he "intended to try and become President". Thatcher said to him, "I am going to become Prime Minister".

In the 1988 New Year Honours, Crawford was appointed a Member of the Order of the British Empire for political service.

Crawford was present at the death of Denis Thatcher in June 2003, saying "I was holding Lady Thatcher's hand, and she was holding Sir Denis's hand when he died". She said "he was her absolute soulmate." She latterly lived as Lady Thatcher's friend and companion.

On 27 January 2021, Crawford was appointed the first female president of Worcestershire County Cricket Club, serving in the role until 2024.

== Personal life ==
She married Ray Crawford and lives in Worcester.

== Cultural depictions ==
In the BBC drama Margaret, Crawford was played by Jenny Howe and in the 2011 film The Iron Lady by Angela Curran.
