= Major ministry =

Major ministry may refer to:

- First Major ministry, the British majority government led by John Major from 1990 to 1992
- Second Major ministry, the British majority (later minority) government led by John Major from 1992 to 1997

== See also ==
- Premiership of John Major
- Shadow Cabinet of John Major
