= Renton =

Renton may refer to:

== People ==
- Alex Renton (born 1961), British-Canadian author and journalist
- Dave Renton (born 1972), a British barrister and historian
- David Renton (1908–2007), a British politician
- David Malcolm Renton (1878–1947), an American builder and business executive
- Frank Renton (born 1939), British musician, conductor and broadcaster
- Kris Renton (born 1990), Scottish football player
- Kristen Renton (born 1982), American actress
- Polly Renton (1970–2010), British documentary film maker
- Tim Renton, Baron Renton of Mount Harry (1932–2020), British politician

== Fictional characters ==
- Mark Renton, protagonist of the novel Trainspotting by Irvine Welsh, and the film adaptation by Danny Boyle
- Renton Thurston, protagonist of anime Eureka Seven

== Places ==
- Renton, Ontario, Canada, a hamlet
- Renton, West Dunbartonshire, Scotland, a village
- Renton, Washington, United States, a city

== Sports ==
- Renton F.C., a former football club based in Renton, West Dunbartonshire, Scotland
