= Parliamentary Under-Secretary of State for Indo-Pacific =

British Government diplomacy position

United Kingdom Parliamentary Under-Secretary of State for Indo-Pacific
- Royal Arms of His Majesty's Government

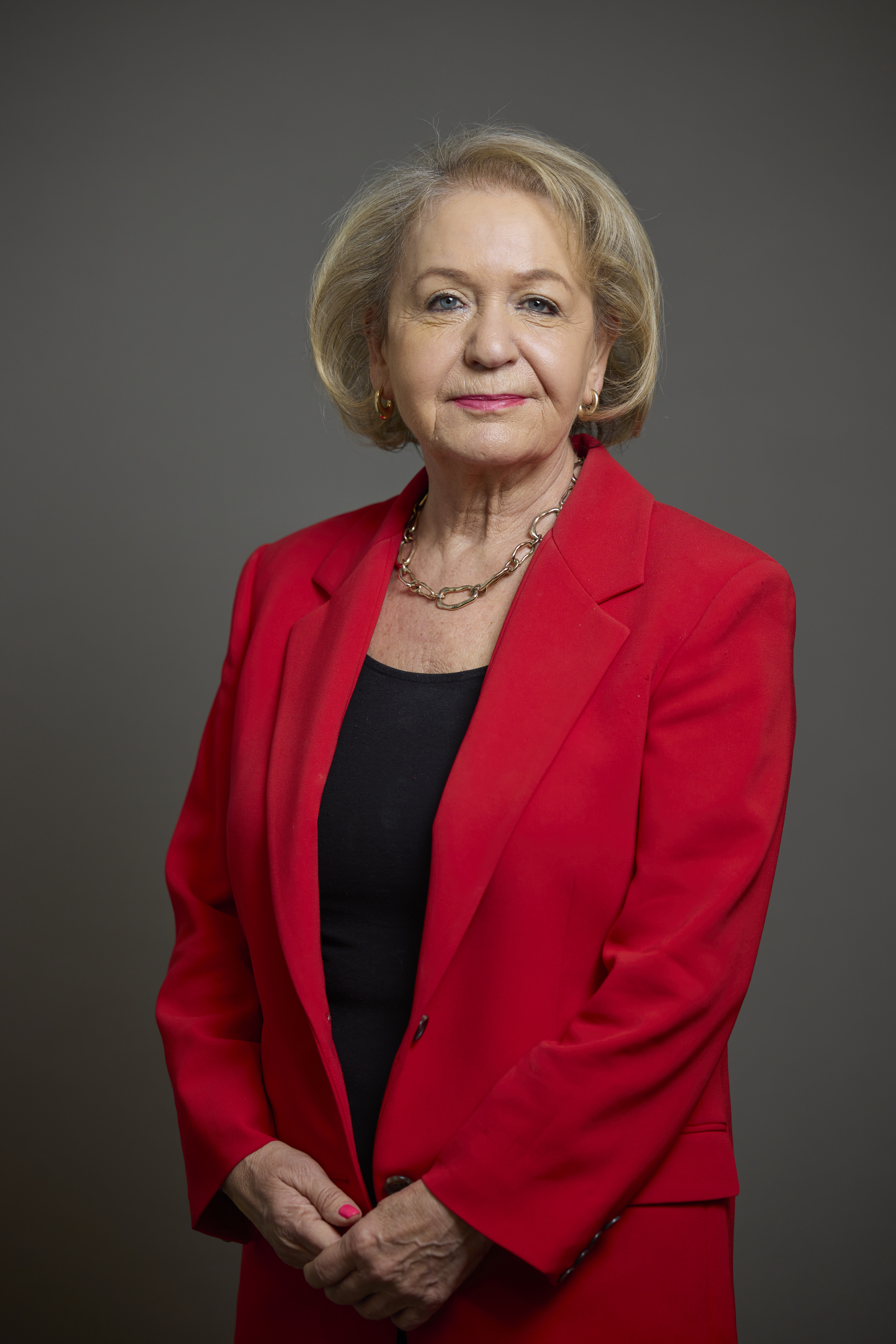
- Incumbent; Rosie Winterton, Baroness Winterton of Doncaster since 23 July 2026
- Foreign, Commonwealth and Development Office
- Reports to: Foreign Secretary
- Nominator: Prime Minister of the United Kingdom
- Appointer: The King (on the advice of the Prime Minister)
- Term length: At His Majesty's pleasure
- Formation: 1943
- First holder: Richard Law
- Website: www.gov.uk/government/ministers/parliamentary-under-secretary-of-state--347

The Parliamentary Under-Secretary of State for Indo-Pacific is a junior-level ministerial position in the Foreign, Commonwealth and Development Office of His Majesty's Government. The office was known as Minister of State for Europe and the Americas from 2010 to 2020. It was most recently merged into the office of Minister of State for the Pacific and the International Environment to create the new office of Minister of State for Indo-Pacific.

== Responsibilities ==
The Minister's responsibilities include:

- China and Northeast Asia
- Southeast Asia
- Australia, New Zealand and Pacific Islands
- Indian Ocean
- Economic security (including export controls)
- Sanctions
- Economics and evaluation (including the Chief Economist)
- Regulatory and economic diplomacy
- Technology and analysis

== List of ministers ==
Minister of State	Term of office		Political party	Ministry	F.Sec.
Minister of State for Foreign Affairs
Richard Law; MP for Kingston upon Hull South West	25 September 1943	25 May 1945	Conservative	Churchill War	Eden
William Mabane; MP for Huddersfield	25 May 1945	26 July 1945	National Liberal	Churchill Caretaker	Eden
Philip Noel-Baker; MP for Derby	3 August 1945	4 October 1946	Labour	Attlee	Bevin
Hector McNeil; MP for Greenock	4 October 1946	28 February 1950	Labour	Attlee	Bevin
Kenneth Younger; MP for Great Grimsby	28 February 1950	26 October 1951	Labour	Attlee	Bevin
Kenneth Younger; MP for Great Grimsby	28 February 1950	26 October 1951	Labour	Attlee	Morrison
Selwyn Lloyd; MP for Wirral	30 October 1951	18 October 1954	Conservative	Churchill III	Eden
Gerald Isaacs, 2nd Marquess of Reading; Hereditary peer	11 November 1953	9 January 1957	Conservative	Churchill III (1953–1955); Eden (1955–1957)	Eden (1953–1955); Macmillan (1955); Lloyd (1955–1959)
Anthony Nutting; MP for Melton	18 October 1954	3 November 1956	Conservative	Churchill III (1953–1955); Eden (1955–1957)	Eden (1953–1955); Macmillan (1955); Lloyd (1955–1959)
Allan Noble; MP for Chelsea	9 November 1956	16 January 1959	Conservative	Eden	Lloyd
David Ormsby-Gore; MP for Oswestry	16 January 1957	27 June 1961	Conservative	Macmillan	Lloyd
John Profumo; MP for Stratford-on-Avon	16 January 1959	27 July 1960	Conservative	Macmillan	Lloyd
Joseph Godber; MP for Grantham	27 June 1961	27 June 1963	Conservative	Macmillan	Douglas-Home
Henry Scrymgeour-Wedderburn, 11th Earl of Dundee; Hereditary peer	9 October 1961	16 October 1964	Conservative	Macmillan	Douglas-Home
Henry Scrymgeour-Wedderburn, 11th Earl of Dundee; Hereditary peer	9 October 1961	16 October 1964	Conservative	Douglas-Home	Butler
Peter Thomas; MP for Conwy	27 June 1963	16 October 1964	Conservative	Douglas-Home	Butler
George Thomson; MP for Dundee East	16 October 1964	31 March 1966	Labour	Wilson I & II	Gordon Walker (1964–1965); Stewart (1965–1966); Brown (1965–1968)
Hugh Foot, Baron Caradon; Life peer	16 October 1964	17 October 1968	Labour	Wilson I & II	Gordon Walker (1964–1965); Stewart (1965–1966); Brown (1965–1968)
Walter Padley; MP for Ogmore	19 October 1964	7 January 1967	Labour	Wilson I & II	Gordon Walker (1964–1965); Stewart (1965–1966); Brown (1965–1968)
Alun Gwynne Jones, Baron Chalfont; Life peer	23 October 1964	17 October 1968	Labour	Wilson I & II	Gordon Walker (1964–1965); Stewart (1965–1966); Brown (1965–1968)
Eirene White; MP for East Flintshire	31 March 1966	7 January 1967	Labour	Wilson I & II	Brown (1966–1968); Stewart (1968)
George Thomson; MP for Dundee East	7 January 1967	29 August 1967	Labour	Wilson I & II	Brown (1966–1968); Stewart (1968)
Fred Mulley; MP for Sheffield Park	7 January 1967	17 October 1968	Labour	Wilson I & II	Brown (1966–1968); Stewart (1968)
Goronwy Roberts; MP for Caernarfon	29 August 1967	17 October 1968	Labour	Wilson I & II	Brown (1966–1968); Stewart (1968)
Minister of State for Foreign and Commonwealth Affairs
Hugh Foot, Baron Caradon; Life peer	17 October 1968	19 June 1970	Labour	Wilson I & II	Stewart
Alun Gwynne Jones, Baron Chalfont; Life peer	17 October 1968	19 June 1970	Labour	Wilson I & II	Stewart
Fred Mulley; MP for Sheffield Park	17 October 1968	13 October 1969	Labour	Wilson I & II	Stewart
Goronwy Roberts; MP for Caernarfon	17 October 1968	13 October 1969	Labour	Wilson I & II	Stewart
Malcolm Shepherd, 2nd Baron Shepherd; Hereditary peer	17 October 1968	19 June 1970	Labour	Wilson I & II	Stewart
Joseph Godber; MP for Grantham	19 June 1970	9 April 1972	Conservative	Heath	Douglas-Home
Priscilla Buchan, Baroness Tweedsmuir of Belhelvie; Life peer	9 April 1972	4 March 1974	Conservative	Heath	Douglas-Home
Julian Amery; MP for Brighton Pavilion	9 April 1972	4 March 1974	Conservative	Heath	Douglas-Home
Robert Lindsay, Lord Balniel; MP for Hertford	9 April 1972	4 March 1974	Conservative	Heath	Douglas-Home
David Ennals; MP for Norwich North	7 March 1974	10 September 1976	Labour	Wilson III & IV	Callaghan
Roy Hattersley; MP for Birmingham Sparkbrook	7 March 1974	10 September 1976	Labour	Wilson III & IV	Callaghan
Goronwy Roberts, Baron Goronwy-Roberts; Life peer	4 December 1975	4 May 1979	Labour	Wilson III & IV	Callaghan
Goronwy Roberts, Baron Goronwy-Roberts; Life peer	4 December 1975	4 May 1979	Labour	Callaghan	Callaghan
Goronwy Roberts, Baron Goronwy-Roberts; Life peer	4 December 1975	4 May 1979	Labour	Callaghan	Crosland (1976–1977); Owen (1977–1979)
Ted Rowlands; MP for Merthyr Tydfil	10 September 1976	4 May 1979	Labour	Callaghan	Crosland (1976–1977); Owen (1977–1979)
David Owen; MP for Plymouth Devonport	10 September 1976	21 February 1977	Labour	Callaghan	Crosland
Frank Judd; MP for Portsmouth North	21 February 1977	4 May 1979	Labour	Callaghan	Owen
Peter Blaker; MP for Blackpool South	4 May 1979	14 September 1981	Conservative	Thatcher I	Peter Carington
Nicholas Ridley; MP for Cirencester and Tewkesbury	4 May 1979	14 September 1981	Conservative	Thatcher I	Peter Carington
Richard Luce; MP for Shoreham	14 September 1981	5 April 1982	Conservative	Thatcher I	Peter Carington
Cranley Onslow; MP for Woking	5 April 1982	13 June 1983	Conservative	Thatcher I	Pym
John Ganzoni, 2nd Baron Belstead; Hereditary peer	5 April 1982	13 June 1983	Conservative	Thatcher I	Pym
Richard Luce; MP for Shoreham	13 June 1983	2 September 1985	Conservative	Thatcher II	Howe
Janet Young, Baroness Young; Life peer	13 June 1983	13 June 1987	Conservative	Thatcher II	Howe
Tim Renton; MP for Mid Sussex	2 September 1985	13 June 1987	Conservative	Thatcher II	Howe
David Mellor; MP for Putney	13 June 1987	25 July 1988	Conservative	Thatcher III	Howe
Simon Arthur, 4th Baron Glenarthur; Hereditary peer	13 June 1987	24 July 1989	Conservative	Thatcher III	Howe
William Waldegrave; MP for Bristol West	26 July 1988	2 November 1990	Conservative	Thatcher III	Howe
William Waldegrave; MP for Bristol West	26 July 1988	2 November 1990	Conservative	Thatcher III	Major (1989); Hurd (1989–1990)
Ivon Moore-Brabazon, 3rd Baron Brabazon of Tara; Hereditary peer	24 July 1989	14 July 1990	Conservative	Thatcher III	Major (1989); Hurd (1989–1990)
Malcolm Sinclair, 20th Earl of Caithness; Hereditary peer	14 July 1990	14 April 1992	Conservative	Thatcher III	Hurd
Malcolm Sinclair, 20th Earl of Caithness; Hereditary peer	14 July 1990	14 April 1992	Conservative	Major I	Hurd
Douglas Hogg; MP for Grantham	2 November 1990	5 July 1995	Conservative	Major I	Hurd
Douglas Hogg; MP for Grantham	2 November 1990	5 July 1995	Conservative	Major II	Hurd
Alastair Goodlad; MP for Eddisbury	15 April 1992	5 July 1995	Conservative	Major II	Hurd
Jeremy Hanley; MP for Richmond and Barnes	5 July 1995	5 May 1997	Conservative	Major II	Rifkind
Nicholas Bonsor; MP for Upminster	5 July 1995	5 May 1997	Conservative	Major II	Rifkind
Tony Lloyd; MP for Manchester Central	5 May 1997	28 July 1999	Labour	Blair I	Cook
John Battle; MP for Leeds West	28 July 1999	11 June 2001	Labour	Blair I	Cook
Minister of State for the Middle East
Elizabeth Symons, Baroness Symons of Vernham Dean; Life peer	11 June 2001	5 May 2005	Labour	Blair II	Straw
Minister of State for Foreign and Commonwealth Affairs
Kim Howells; MP for Pontypridd	11 May 2005	6 October 2008	Labour	Blair III; Brown	Beckett; Miliband
Bill Rammell; MP for Harlow	6 October 2008	8 June 2009	Labour	Brown	Miliband
Ivan Lewis; MP for Bury South	8 June 2009	11 May 2010	Labour	Brown	Miliband
Minister of State for Europe and the Americas
Jeremy Browne; MP for Taunton Deane	13 May 2010	4 September 2012	Liberal Democrat	Cameron–Clegg	Hague
Hugo Swire; MP for East Devon	4 September 2012	15 July 2016	Conservative	Cameron–Clegg	Hammond
Hugo Swire; MP for East Devon	4 September 2012	15 July 2016	Conservative	Cameron II	Hammond
Alan Duncan; MP for Rutland and Melton	15 July 2016	22 July 2019	Conservative	May I & II	Johnson; Hunt
Chris Pincher; MP for Tamworth	25 July 2019	13 February 2020	Conservative	Johnson I	Raab
Minister of State for Indo-Pacific
Anne-Marie Trevelyan; MP for Berwick-upon-Tweed	26 October 2022	5 July 2024	Conservative	Sunak	Cleverly; Cameron
Parliamentary Under-Secretary of State for Indo-Pacific
Catherine West; MP for Hornsey and Friern Barnet	9 July 2024	6 September 2025	Labour	Starmer	Lammy
Seema Malhotra; MP for Feltham and Heston	6 September 2025	22 July 2026	Labour	Starmer	Cooper
Rosie Winterton, Baroness Winterton of Doncaster	23 July 2026	Incumbent	Labour	Burnham	Miliband

== See also ==
- Foreign, Commonwealth and Development Office
- Foreign Secretary
- Minister of State for Europe
- Parliamentary Under-Secretary of State for Foreign Affairs
