= Leigh Folk Festival =

- Status: Active
- Genre: Festivals
- Begins: 27 June 1992
- Frequency: Annually
- Location: Leigh-on-Sea
- Country: United Kingdom
- Years active: 34
- Founder: Sean Wyer
- Most recent: 2019
- Attendance: 20,000
- Budget: £20,000 – £25,000
- Website: leighfolkfestival.com

Leigh Folk Festival is an annual music and arts festival, established in 1992 as part of National Music Day (UK), and is held at indoor and outdoor venues in Leigh-on-Sea, Essex. The festival is known for being the largest free folk festival in the United Kingdom and it takes place on the last weekend in June. It has an eclectic mix of music programming and a wide definition of what might be considered folk. It is registered as a UK charity, devoted to "further[ing] public education and understanding of traditional and contemporary folk arts including: Music, Dance, Spoken word (poetry and storytelling)".

The festival typically takes place on the last weekend in June, and follows the format of a series of evening concerts on Thursday and Friday, with a celebration of music in Leigh Library Gardens and the immediate surrounding area on Saturday, with curated music throughout Old Leigh on Sunday.

In 2020, the festival was cancelled due to the COVID-19 pandemic, Will Varley was due to open the event.

== History ==
It was originally a one-day music event named Midsummer Music Day and organised by local musician Sean Wyer, with its name later changing to The Southend and Leigh Folk Festival. It was initially organised as part of the National Music Day (UK) initiative that was championed by Mick Jagger, the at the time Minister of State for the Arts and Harvey Goldsmith, when 1,500 musical events took place across the UK. Leigh Folk Festival evolved over time, and now hosts around 200 performers a year, across 20 venues, with an attendance of around 20,000 people over four days. Alongside the free elements of the festival there are a number of paid ticketed events which contribute to subsidising the free element of the festival.

In 2016 as part of its fundraising it successfully launched a Crowdfunding campaign to raise £5,000 to ensure the festival could remain free.

Between 2008 and 2017 the festival's organisers curated a series of compilation albums that included tracks from artists who had performed at the festival, had been recorded live or written exclusively for the album. To date, there have been nine albums, with proceeds from sales going towards the festival's running costs.

In 2016 it launched 'The Estuary Songwriting Project' with funding from Arts Council England and support from the English Folk Dance and Song Society, that tasked a group of musicians to create a 45-minute performance of music themed around the Thames Estuary. The artists were Alasdair Roberts, Lucy Farrell, M.G. Boulter, Roshi Nasehi, Piers Haslam, Hazel Askew, Nick Pynn and Kate Waterfield.

In 2017 the festival celebrated its 25th anniversary, commemorating the occasion with a special edition album named 'Dog Days, Devil Fish & Darkest England' released only on vinyl.

== Performances ==
Supporters of the festival have included Southend YMCA, who ran a stage at the festival, provided volunteers and launched a CD as a fundraiser. Historically Leigh Lions Club has provided the event with volunteers and financial support. Other supporters include Southend-on-Sea City Council, local businesses and breweries.

Notable performances at the festival have included Digby Fairweather, Martin Carthy, Alasdair Roberts, Trembling Bells,,[John Otway], [Arfur Doo And The Toe Rags], [The Famous Potatoes], Dagenham Girl Pipers, You Are Wolf, The Owl Service (band), Stick in the Wheel, Richard Digance, Missing Andy, The Copper Family, Shirley Collins, Michael Chapman, Wizz Jones, Jonny Kearney & Lucy Farrell and Dick Gaughan.
