= Baron Donaldson =

Baron Donaldson could refer to:

- John George Stuart Donaldson, Baron Donaldson of Kingsbridge (1907–1998)
- John Donaldson, Baron Donaldson of Lymington (1920–2005)
