= Make Music Day UK =

Annual music celebration

Make Music Day UK, formerly National Music Day, National Music Festival, and Music Day UK, is the name for the British component of the annual celebrations of music that takes place around the world on 21 June, known as Make Music Day in the Anglosphere. The concept of an all-day musical celebration on the day of the solstice was originated in 1982 by the French Minister of Culture, Jack Lang and France continues it under its original name of Fête de la Musique. It was this event that inspired the current UK incarnation.

In the UK, the day was launched in 1992, on the initiative of Mick Jagger and Tim Renton MP, at the time Minister of State for the Arts, it ran until 1997. After an unofficial hiatus Music Day UK was formed and is the organisation that has been coordinating UK events since 2012.

== Origins ==
The British National Music Day was the idea of The Rolling Stones' musician Mick Jagger and Tim Renton MP, the at the time Minister of State for the Arts, and launched on 12 February 1992 at a press conference at the Royal Festival Hall, in London, with event Chairman Harvey Goldsmith and Jagger. The first event took place on 28 June 1992, with a programme of more than 1,500 events across the United Kingdom.

The first event was supported by the Musicians' Union (United Kingdom), with 50 of its branches taking part, and small grants were made available by the European Commission for local events with a budget of less than £10,000. The National Music Day Foundation was created to support the events, chaired by Goldsmith, with trustees including Baron Armstrong of Ilminster. To mark the launch Glastonbury Festival, which was taking place on the same weekend, was linked to National Music Day. BBC Radio 1 hosted a National Music Day Roadshow in Glasgow. Richard Allinson won a Gold at Radio Academy Awards for his coverage of the first event on BBC Radio 2, which was part of a 15-hour day of broadcasts to mark the occasion, with shows also presented by Ken Bruce.

In 1993, the event became two days, taking place on 26 and 27 June. It was launched at Hard Rock Cafe, London, by Peter Brooke, Baron Brooke of Sutton Mandeville and Right Said Fred. More than 1,100 live events took place across the country. A live broadcast by MCM Networks, and sponsored by Coca-Cola, linked 41 Independent Local Radio stations with venues, and went on to win gold at the Radio Academy Awards for Outstanding Special Event. Buzzcocks performed a live version of their song "Lipstick" on BBC Radio 1 that was later released on a BBC Sessions album by the band in 1997.

The event's third rendition took place on 26 June 1994, and was again marked with a day of broadcasts on BBC Radio 2. Arts Council England awarded £40,000 in grants.

The 1995 event was a two-day event on 24 and 25 June and had a focus on encouraging children to play musical instruments. In 1995, BBC coverage of the event continued, which included a special edition of Songs of Praise from Pebble Mill Studios, in Birmingham. It was launched in London by Dave Bartram, vocalist of Showaddywaddy, Les McKeown, vocalist of the Bay City Rollers, and Screaming Lord Sutch. Music Week reported that the 1995 event was the most successful so far with 1,500 events taking place across the country.

The fifth event took place on 30 June 1996, and coincided with the UEFA Euro 1996 Final. It was now chaired by record producer Keith Lowde, and renamed the National Music Festival. 2,300 events were held, attended by an estimated 3,700,000 people, it is thought that many of these were pre-existing events that would have taken place anyway. It was reported that the event had "largely failed to capture the public imagination". Lowde said, in an unpublished interim report for the Foundation:

Whilst finding favour with a large number of event organisers, many of whom were novices, the concept failed to capture the imagination of the professional music industry, sponsors and the media. The perceived image of the " – Day" became generally Middle England, Middle of the Road and Middle Aged.

Despite the event losing cultural significance, it was held again in 1997, with the date moving to August. The List, while reviewing France's National Music Day, reported that the UK efforts had failed to catch-on.

== Modern incarnations ==
In May 2000, the BBC organised a five-day namesake event "BBC Music Live" which culminated in a 24-hour broadcast on Bank Holiday Monday 29 May.

In 2012, Music Day UK was formed and was both the name of the renewed event, and the organisation that had been coordinating UK events since 2012. Make Music Day UK became an independent organization in 2022. The event is based on the now international Make Music Day concept, begun in France in 1982. All events take place on 21 June (the summer solstice in the northern hemisphere), and all events are free and accessible to the general public.

== Notable events ==
- In 1994, Gloria Hunniford and Matthew Kelly present Opera Singalong, live from the Royal Albert Hall.
- At London's Hammersmith Odeon, 30 June 1993, an event called "A Celebration of the Blues" featured Mick Jagger, Ronnie Wood, Jimmy Rogers, the Charlie Watts Quintet, Gary Moore and Pops Staples.

== Cultural impact ==
A number of events that were organised as part of National Music Day continued to run for many years after the national effort ceased to continue. They include:

- Leigh Folk Festival, in Leigh-on-Sea, Essex
- Pulham Music Day
