= Recordando o Vale das Maçãs =

- Origin: Santos, São Paulo, Brazil
- Genres: Progressive rock
- Years active: 1973–present
- Labels: Gravações Tupi Associadas · Progressive Rock Worldwide · Rock Symphony

Recordando o Vale das Maçãs (lit. 'Remembering the Valley of Apples') is a Brazilian progressive rock band formed in 1973 in Santos, São Paulo.

== History ==
The band was formed in 1973 in Santos, São Paulo, by friends Fernando Pacheco (guitars and vocals), Fernando Motta (guitars and percussion), and Domingos Mariotti (flute, vocals), with the idea of trying to express the sound of nature through music. Motta and Pacheco had previously played together in the bands Os Lobos and End Up Six. Over the years, new musicians joined the group, and Domingos left in 1977. Pacheco, Motta, Luis Aranha (violin), Moacir Amaral (flutes), Eliseu de Oliveira (keyboards), Ronaldo Mesquita (bass), and Milton Bernardes (drums) recorded the album As Crianças da Nova Floresta in 1977, though it was released in 1978.

The band was hired by TV Tupi and regularly appeared on the program Almoço com as Estrelas. However, the station shut down, and they began recording specials for TV Cultura, as well as participating in programs on Bandeirantes and Globo. In 1982, they released the single Sorriso de Verão/Flores na Estrada, featuring drummer Lourenço Gotti, which propelled the band to first place on the radio charts in Santos.

After a period of separation, in the 1990s they returned to performing concerts across Brazil, culminating in the release of As Crianças da Nova Floresta II (1994). This album revisits songs from As Crianças da Nova Floresta and Pacheco's solo album Himalaia but in instrumental versions. The group gained recognition in Europe and Japan, as As Crianças da Nova Floresta had been released there. In 1994, readers of the French magazine Big Bang voted As Crianças da Nova Floresta II the best progressive album of that year. This led to an invitation, facilitated by the French embassy, to perform at the Fête de la Musique in Paris in 1997.

== Discography ==
=== Studio albums ===
- As Crianças da Nova Floresta (1977)
- As Crianças da Nova Floresta II (1994)

=== Singles ===
- Sorriso de Verão/Flores na Estrada (1982)
