= Lord Donaldson =

Lord Donaldson could refer to:

- Jack Donaldson, Baron Donaldson of Kingsbridge (1907–1998), British politician and public servant
- John Donaldson, Baron Donaldson of Lymington (1920–2005), British barrister and judge
