= List of titles and honours of Edward Wood, 1st Earl of Halifax =

Edward Wood, 1st Earl of Halifax, KG, OM, GCSI, GCMG, GCIE, TD, PC, received numerous honours and awards throughout his career as a British Army officer, statesman and diplomat.

== Styles ==
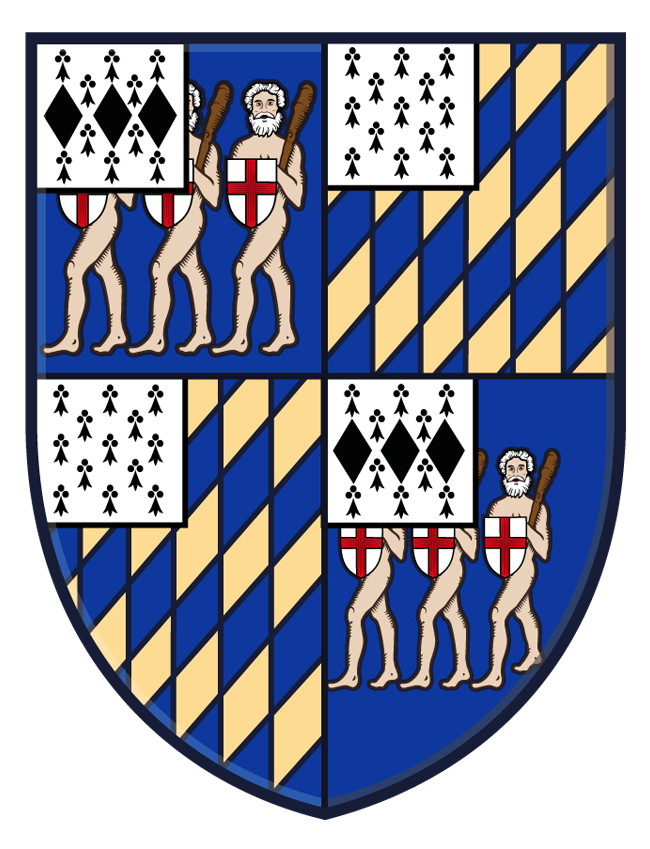
Arms of The Rt Hon Edward Frederick Lindley Wood, 1st Earl of Halifax

- 16 April 1881 – 8 August 1885: Edward Frederick Lindley Wood
- 8 August 1885 – 1910: The Hon. Edward Frederick Lindley Wood
- 1910 – 25 October 1922: The Hon. Edward Frederick Lindley Wood MP
- 25 October 1922 – 22 December 1925: The Rt. Hon. Edward Frederick Lindley Wood MP
- 22 December 1925 – 3 April 1926: The Rt. Hon. The 1st Baron Irwin PC
- 3 April 1926 – 18 April 1931: His Excellency The Rt. Hon. The Lord Irwin PC, Viceroy and Governor-General of India
- 18 April 1931 – 19 January 1934: The Rt. Hon. The Lord Irwin PC
- 19 January 1934 – December 1940: The Rt. Hon. The 3rd Viscount Halifax PC
- December 1940 – 1944: His Excellency The Rt. Hon. The Viscount Halifax PC, HM Ambassador to the United States of America
- 1944–1946: His Excellency The Rt. Hon. The 1st Earl of Halifax PC, HM Ambassador to the United States of America
- 1946–1959: The Rt. Hon. The Earl of Halifax PC

== Commonwealth honours ==
=== British Empire ===
Appointments

Country	Date	Appointment	Post-nominal letters
England	1931 – 23 December 1959	Knight Companion of the Most Noble Order of the Garter	KG
British Empire	13 June 1946 – 23 December 1959	Member of the Order of Merit	OM
United Kingdom	16 July 1957 – 23 December 1959	Knight Grand Cross of the Order of St Michael and St George	GCMG
United Kingdom	3 April 1926 – 23 December 1959	Knight Grand Commander of the Order of the Star of India	GCSI
United Kingdom	3 April 1926 – 23 December 1959	Knight Grand Commander of the Order of the Indian Empire	GCIE
United Kingdom	1922 – 23 December 1959	Member of Her Majesty's Most Honourable Privy Council	PC

Decorations and medals

Country	Date	Decoration	Post-nominal letters
United Kingdom	1919	1914–15 Star	
United Kingdom	26 July 1919	British War Medal	
United Kingdom	1 September 1919	Victory Medal	
United Kingdom		Territorial Decoration	TD

== Non-national titles and honours ==
=== Freedom of the City ===
British Empire

- (England) 5 March 1923: Leeds
- (England) 1926: Harrogate

=== Scholastic ===
Chancellor, visitor, governor, and fellowships

Location	Date	School	Position
England	November 1903	All Souls College, Oxford	Fellowship
England	1933–1959	University of Oxford	Chancellor
England	1947–1959	University of Sheffield	Chancellor

Honorary degrees

Location	Date	School	Degree
England	1931	University of Sheffield	Doctor of Laws (LL.D)
Ontario	1932	University of Toronto	Doctor of Laws (LL.D)
England	26 January 1934	University of Liverpool	
Massachusetts	19 June 1941	Harvard University	Doctor of Laws (LL.D)
Connecticut	1941	Yale University	Doctor of Laws (LL.D)
Tennessee	10 April 1942	Sewanee: The University of the South	Doctor of Civil Law (DCL)
New York	1942	Syracuse University	Doctor of Laws (LL.D)
England	1955	University of Nottingham	Doctor of Laws (LL.D)

=== Honorary offices ===
Appointments

Country	Date	Appointment	Position
England	1943–1959	Most Noble Order of the Garter	Chancellor of the Order
England	27 June 1947 – 23 December 1959	Westminster Abbey	High Steward
United Kingdom	1957–1959	Order of St Michael and St George	Grand Master of the Order
