= Edward Luce =

English journalist

The Honourable Edward Luce
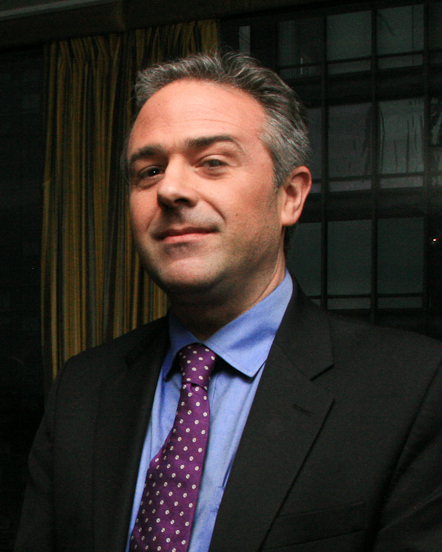
- Luce in 2012
- Born: Edward Geoffrey Luce; 1 June 1968 (age 58); Sussex, England
- Education: Lancing College
- Alma mater: University of Oxford; City, University of London
- Occupations: Author, journalist
- Employer(s): Financial Times; The Guardian
- Spouses: Priya Basu (div. 2015) Niamh King (m. 2017)
- Parent: Richard Luce, Baron Luce
- Relatives: William Luce (grandfather); David Luce (great-uncle); Trevylyan Napier (great-grandfather); Miranda Hart (cousin)
- Writing career
- Genre: Non-fiction
- Subjects: American politics and economics, India

Edward Geoffrey Luce (born 1 June 1968) is an English journalist and the Financial Times chief US commentator and columnist based in Washington, D.C.

== Early life ==
Luce is the son of Rose Helen (born Nicholson) and Richard Luce, Baron Luce. His father served as Lord Chamberlain to Queen Elizabeth II of the United Kingdom from 2000 to 2006, Governor of Gibraltar, a Conservative member of parliament (MP) (1971 to 1992), government minister, and a crossbench member of the House of Lords. His paternal grandfather is William Luce, Governor and Commander-in-Chief of Aden, Political Resident in the Gulf and Special Representative to the Foreign Secretary (Lord Home) for Gulf Affairs. His great-uncle admiral David Luce served as First Sea Lord from 1963 to 1966. His maternal great-grandfather is vice-admiral Trevylyan Napier, who served as Commander-in-Chief in the America and West Indies Station from 1919 to 1920. His first cousin is actress Miranda Hart.

Luce was educated at various private boarding schools in Sussex, latterly at Lancing College, near the coastal village of Lancing. He graduated with a degree in Philosophy, Politics and Economics (PPE) in 1990 from the University of Oxford where he was an undergraduate student at New College, Oxford. He subsequently received a postgraduate diploma in newspaper journalism from City, University of London.

== Career ==
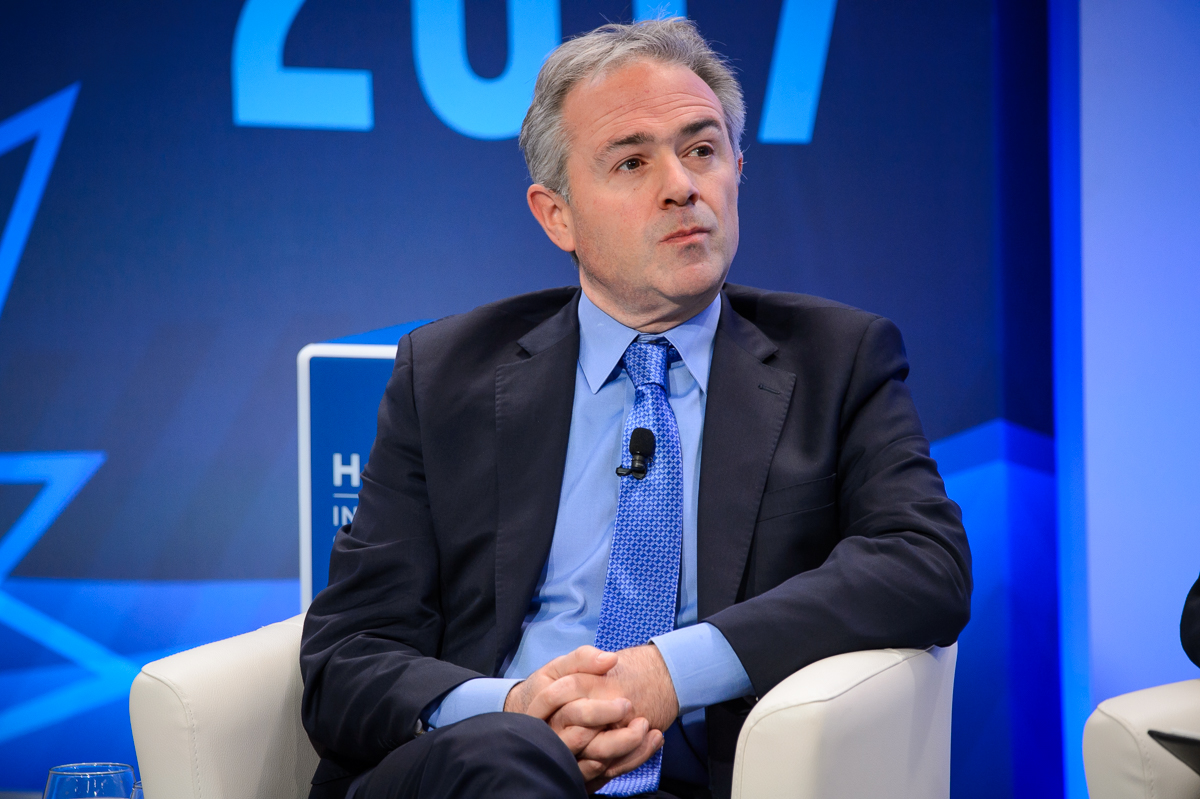
Luce at the Halifax International Security Forum 2017

Between 1993 and 1994, Luce was a correspondent for The Guardian in Geneva, Switzerland.

Luce joined the Financial Times in 1995 and initially reported from the Philippines, after which he took a one-year sabbatical working in Washington, D.C., as speechwriter for Lawrence Summers, then U.S. Treasury Secretary (1999–2001) during the administration of Bill Clinton.

He has been the paper's Capital Markets editor and the Financial Times's South Asia bureau chief based in New Delhi between 2001 and 2006. He then became the Washington bureau chief and subsequently the paper's chief US commentator and columnist. Luce is the author, along with colleague Rana Foroohar, of the twice weekly Swamp Notes newsletter, which covers the intersection of money, power, and politics in America.

=== Publications ===
- In Spite of the Gods: The Strange Rise of Modern India (2006)
- Time to Start Thinking: America in the Age of Descent (2012)
- The Retreat of Western Liberalism (2017)
- Zbig: The Life of Zbigniew Brzezinski, America's Great Power Prophet (2025)

== Personal life ==
Luce was married to Priya Basu, the World Bank's lead economist for South Asia, with whom he has a daughter; they divorced in 2015. In June 2017, Luce married Niamh King, a director of the Aspen Strategy Group and the Aspen Security Forum.
