= Hugh Jenkins, Baron Jenkins of Putney =

British politician and life peer

The Right Honourable The Lord Jenkins of Putney PC
- Hugh Jenkins

Minister of State for the Arts
- In office 4 March 1974 – 5 April 1976
- Prime Minister: Harold Wilson
- Preceded by: Norman St John-Stevas
- Succeeded by: The Lord Donaldson of Kingsbridge

Member of the House of Lords
- Lord Temporal
- Life peerage 14 May 1981 – 26 January 2004

Member of Parliament for Putney
- In office 15 October 1964 – 7 April 1979
- Preceded by: Sir Hugh Linstead
- Succeeded by: David Mellor

Personal details
- Born: Hugh Gater Jenkins; 27 July 1908 Enfield, England
- Died: 26 January 2004 (aged 95)
- Party: Labour
- Spouses: Marie Crosbie (m. 1936; died 1989) Helena Maria Pavlidis (m. 1991; died 1994)
- Education: Enfield Grammar School
- Alma mater: London School of Economics

Military service
- Allegiance: United Kingdom
- Branch/service: Royal Air Force
- Unit: Royal Observer Corps
- Battles/wars: Second World War

Hugh Gater Jenkins, Baron Jenkins of Putney, PC (27 July 1908 – 26 January 2004) was a British Labour politician, campaigner and member of Parliament (MP) and the House of Lords.

Jenkins was MP for Putney and served as Arts Minister from 1974 to 1976. He was the Chair of the Campaign for Nuclear Disarmament (CND) between 1979 and 1981, succeeded by Joan Ruddock.

His private papers are held at the London School of Economics.

== Before politics ==
Jenkins was born in Enfield, Middlesex, into a 'modest' family, his parents being a dairyman and a butcher's daughter. He attended Enfield Grammar School and went to work for the Prudential Assurance 1930–40. He married his first wife, Marie Crosbie, in 1936. She died in 1989 and he married a second time to Helena Maria Pavlidis in 1991. Helena died in 1994. During World War II he served with the Royal Observer Corps and the Royal Air Force from 1941, and after the war worked at Rangoon Radio until 1947, where he was director of English-language programmes.

== Political life ==
An ardent left-winger, Jenkins was active in the Prudential Staff Association, the National Union of Bank Employees and the actors' union Equity, of which he was assistant general secretary 1957–64. He and his wife, Marie, became active in the politics of his local community in the County Borough of Croydon, Surrey. Jenkins chaired his local Upper Norwood Labour Party and stood for the council, and Marie was elected to Croydon Council for Whitehorse Manor ward in 1949. He stood for Parliament without success in Enfield West in 1950 and Mitcham in 1955. Jenkins was involved in the Victory for Socialism group opposed to the 1956 Suez War and had been a supporter of CND and nuclear disarmament since its foundation in 1957. In 1958 he became a London County Councillor for Stoke Newington and Hackney North, serving until 1965, and he served on the London Labour Party executive in 1962. He was also involved with the Arts Council.

Jenkins won Putney, where he and Marie had moved, in the 1964 election, quickly becoming involved in the Tribune Group of MPs. He was made Shadow Arts Minister in 1973 and became the Arts Minister in 1974, being sacked in 1976 by the Prime Minister James Callaghan. He lost his seat in the 1979 General Election to David Mellor of the Conservative Party, and became Chair of CND in the same year. He was made a life peer as Baron Jenkins of Putney, of Wandsworth in Greater London on 14 May 1981. He attended every day at the House of Lords when it was in session and he was in good health. Jenkins was highly active in the House of Lords. So skilfully did he exploit the informal procedures of the Upper House that a limit had to be imposed on the number of questions a peer could ask each day. He circumvented the government's ban on the publication of Spycatcher by reading lengthy extracts from it to ensure it was on public record in Hansard.

Jenkins continued to write pamphlets and radio plays, serving on the board of the Royal National Theatre. His later plays were typed on an early Amstrad 256. He said he became 'computerised' late in life. His parliamentary correspondence and speeches continued to be typed on the same Amstrad 256 until he entered a care home at the end of his life in 2004.

== CND ==
Jenkins was a long time anti-nuclear campaigner and supporter of CND. His anti-nuclear activities before the formation of CND led to rightwingers within the Labour Party attempting to block him as a parliamentary candidate. He was CND Chair from 1979 to 1981 and vice-chair from 1981. As a Member of the House of Lords, he was chair of the Lords CND group. This was the period in which CND underwent a major revival known as the 'Second Wave'.

Parliament of the United Kingdom
Preceded by Sir Hugh Linstead	Member of Parliament for Putney; 1964–1979	Succeeded by David Mellor
Political offices
Preceded by Norman St John-Stevas	Minister for the Arts; 1974–1976	Succeeded by Lord Donaldson
Non-profit organization positions
Preceded by Bruce Kent	Chair of the Campaign for Nuclear Disarmament; 1979–1981	Succeeded by Joan Ruddock
