= Sourendro—Soumyojit =

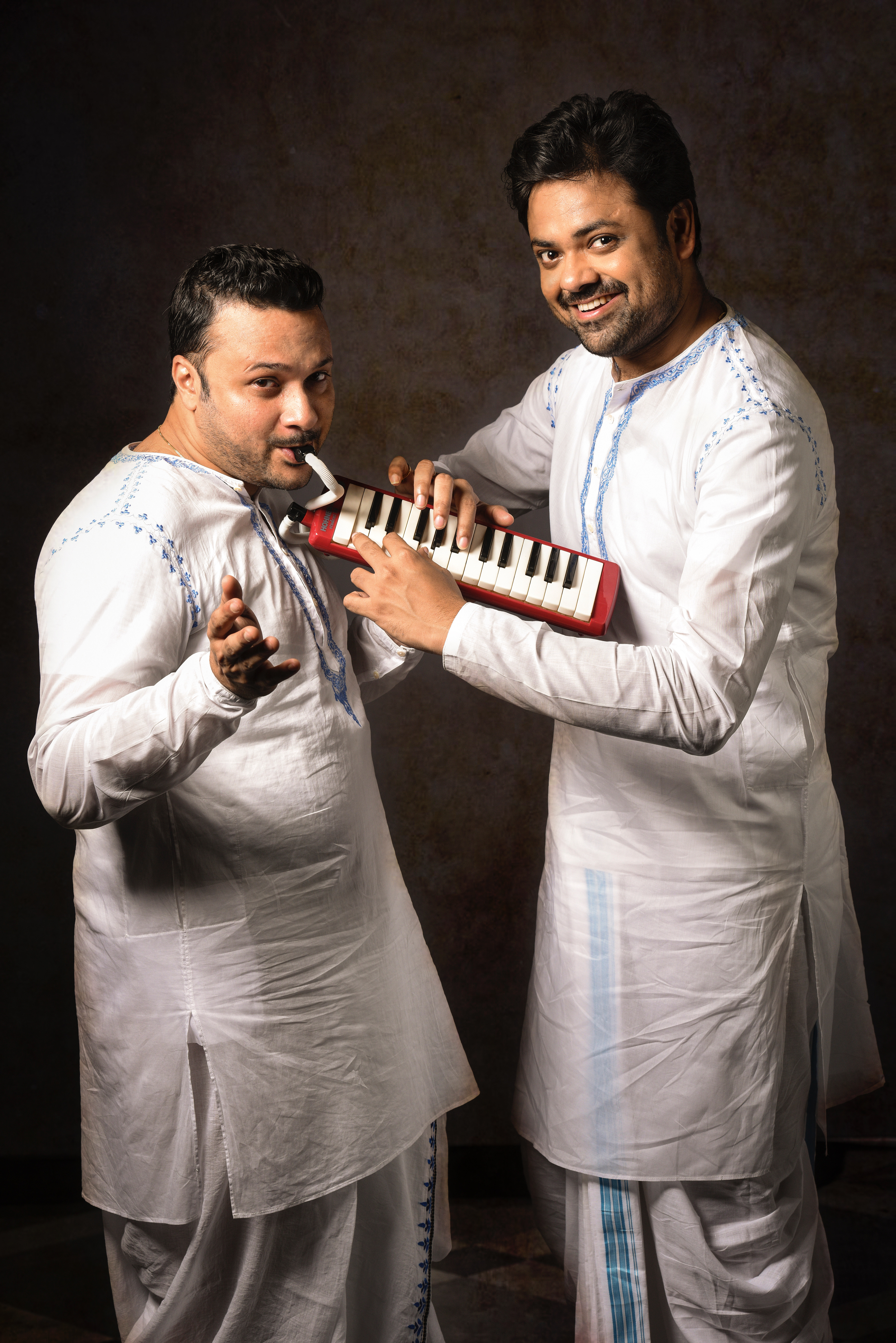

Background information
- Origin: West Bengal, India
- Genres: Film score; Filmi; Fusion; Contemporary; Playback Singing
- Occupations: score composer, music director
- Instruments: Keyboard; Piano; Harmonium
- Years active: 2005 to Present

Sourendro—Soumyojit is an Indian pianist-vocalist musical duo consisting of Sourendro Mullick (pianist) and Soumyojit Das (vocalist).

They are known for performing and presenting experimental and cross-genre musical endeavors. Their performances frequently integrate classical traditions with modern sensibilities, and they have partnered with a diverse array of performers across multiple musical genres.

== Early life and early career ==
Soumyojit Das was born on 21 September 1983 in Barrackpore, West Bengal, India. He attended Modern School, Barrackpore. Later, he moved to Kolkata and completed his schooling at St. Paul's Mission School, Sealdah, followed by his graduation in English at St. Xavier's College, Kolkata.

Das took music lessons at a young age and was called "Little Lata Mangeshkar" in school due to his admiration for the famed Indian Playback singer. He began formal instruction under Indian classical music legend Pandit Ajoy Chakrabarty in 1996 and continues to do so. Lata Mangeshkar inspires his singing style, and he uses many of her techniques.

Sourendro Mullick was born in Kolkata on 14 December 1983 to the erstwhile aristocratic Marble Palace family belonging to the Mullicks. He went to the Jewish Boys School and graduated from St. Xavier's College, Kolkata. His grandfather Mrigendro Mullick, taught him how to play the piano. His grandpa was also a famous national-level billiards player. Later, he learned music from V. Balsara, who was a famous musician and music director known for bringing Indian classical music into piano playing. Ustad Vilayat Khan taught Mullick more about Indian classical music. After meeting for the first time at St. Xavier's College in 2002, the duo began making songs together.

== Musical career ==
In 2005, Sourendro and Soumyojit began their professional career as a musical duo with a concert tour in Europe. In the same year, they established their musical brand, You & I, which was officially inaugurated on 17 December 2005 by the then Governor of West Bengal, Gopalkrishna Gandhi.

While touring Europe, the pair engaged with Prof. Martin Keubert in Cologne, Germany, from whom Sourendro acquired new Western approaches and performing styles, therefore enhancing the duo's global musical vision.

They recorded one of their early songs with Asha Bhosle. Their collaboration with Pelé, a football legend, was exceptional.

Their Ananda Bazaar Samman-winning series "Tagore & We" was lauded by Gulzar for its new perspective on Rabindra Sangeet.

They have partnered with renowned Indian and international artists, including Sharmila Tagore, Aparna Sen, Asha Bhosle, Klaus Voormann, Rekha Bhardwaj, Runa Laila, Sunidhi Chauhan, and German music producer Stefan Stoppok, who included them in his 2007 album Dein Glück – Indische Version.

Their partnership with filmmaker Rituparno Ghosh resulted in multiple live musical theater productions, establishing them as uncommon collaborators in that genre.

The "Jaya Hey" project, which was the grand national anthem, brought together over 40 of India's most famous musicians, including Pt. Shivkumar Sharma, Shankar Mahadevan, Ustad Rashid Khan, Pt. Jasraj, Dr. M. Balamuralikrishna, Hariharan, Sonu Nigam, Shaan, and Jagjit Singh among others. The project "Jaya Hey 2.0", which was the entire song Bharoto Bhagyo Bidhata by Rabindranath Tagore, brought together 75 of India's most famous musicians, including Asha Bhosle, Hariharan, Kavita Krishnamurti, Shreya Ghoshal, Bombay Jayashri, Papon, Kaushiki Chakraborty, Shubha Mudgal, Mame Khan, Usha Uthup, Shankar Mahadevan, Kumar Sanu, Udit Narayan, Shantanu Moitra, Shilpa Rao, Teejan Bai, Amjad Ali Khan and Hariprasad Chaurasia among others.

The "Dekha Hobe Ei Banglay" project presented Bengal's spirit through the words of 100 famous people from 19 districts. They have represented Indian music on international platforms, performing at renowned venues and events including the Rudolstadt Festival, Moers Festival, WDR, Deutsche Welle, Nehru Centre (London), and The British Museum.

Their international tours have spanned Europe, the U.S., Germany, Singapore, Australia, and the Middle East, alongside widespread performances across India.

The duo have had the honor of performing for both the President and Prime Minister of India, and at landmark events including Eden Gardens during the international cricket test match which was the first test match played with a pink ball also known as the Pink Ball Test, the International Kolkata Book Fair, and Gilley's Dallas in the U.S.

In 2023, Sourendro–Soumyojit were entrusted by the Ministry of Culture (India), Government of India, to compose, conduct, and execute the G20 Orchestra, a cultural initiative held across the country during 2023 G20 New Delhi summit.

They curate significant cultural concerts, including World Music Day – Kolkata Chapter, attracting thousands of participants each year.

Their Broadway-style shows, like Mahabharata, Bombay Meri Jaan, and Kohinoor, have pushed the limits of Indian musical theater with their strong themes, innovative staging, and positive reviews.

In addition to performing, Sourendro and Soumyojit are dedicated teachers and culture ambassadors who give lectures and masterclasses at places like the Samford School of Music in Alabama.

The Sourendro—Soumyojit's Academy of Music Kolkata was set up by them. About 700 kids from all over the world come here to learn the traditional Indian music.

== Other notable performances ==
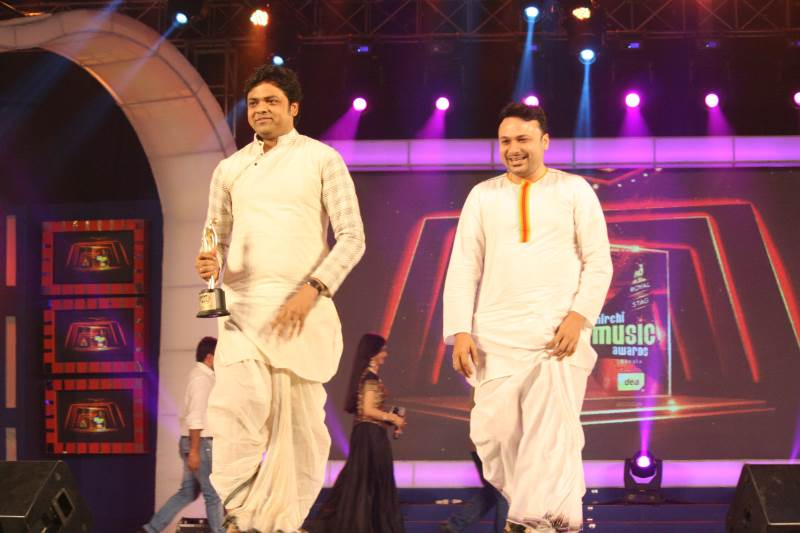
Mirchi Music Awards 2014

- Performed at Global Spirituality Mahotsav (2024), attended by President of India Droupadi Murmu
- 125th Birth Anniversary of Netaji Subhas Chandra Bose at Victoria Memorial, Kolkata (2022), attended by the Prime Minister of India, Sri Narendra Modi and Chief Minister of West Bengal, Mamata Banerjee.
- ABP Ideas of India (2024)
- India Today Conclave (2022)
- Sahitya Aaj Tak (2022)
- Swarnim Vijay Gatha (2021) at Victoria Memorial, commemorating India's victory in the 1971 war and celebrating Indo-Bangladesh friendship, followed by performances on Vijay Diwas in 2022 and 2023
- In 2019, They have performed at the British Museum in England becoming the first Indians to ever perform on the occasion of 150th birthday of Mahatma Gandhi.

== Discography ==
Sourendro—Soumyojit composed a multitude of distinguished songs for live events, concerts, and films.

- Binodiini 2025
- Tagore Our Way 2020
- Timeless Treasures 2019
- Just 10 2017
- Tagore & We 3 2016
- Garden of Life 2015
- Parapaar Film 2014
- Dekha Hobe Ei Banglae 2013
- Tagore & We 2 (2013)
- Tagore & We 1 (2011)
- Jaya Hey 2011
- Back to the Future 2009
