= William Cuthbert =

British politician (1890–1960)

William Nicolson Cuthbert (24 August 1890 – 7 May 1960) was a Conservative Party politician in England.

He was elected at the 1945 general election as member of parliament (MP) for Rye, and when that constituency was abolished for the 1950 general election, he was returned to the House of Commons for the new Arundel & Shoreham constituency.

He made his maiden speech in the 1945 Budget debate on the National Debt. His final substantive speech was in November 1950 in the King's Speech debate although he made contributions as questions up to his final year in office.

He resigned his seat on 15 January 1954, by the procedural device of accepting an appointment as Steward of the Chiltern Hundreds. He was succeeded as MP by Captain Henry Kerby.

Parliament of the United Kingdom
Preceded by George Courthope	Member of Parliament for Rye; 1945 – 1950	Constituency abolished
New constituency	Member of Parliament for Arundel & Shoreham; 1950 – 1954	Succeeded by Henry Kerby
