= David Mellor =

British broadcaster and politician (born 1949)

The Right Honourable David Mellor KC
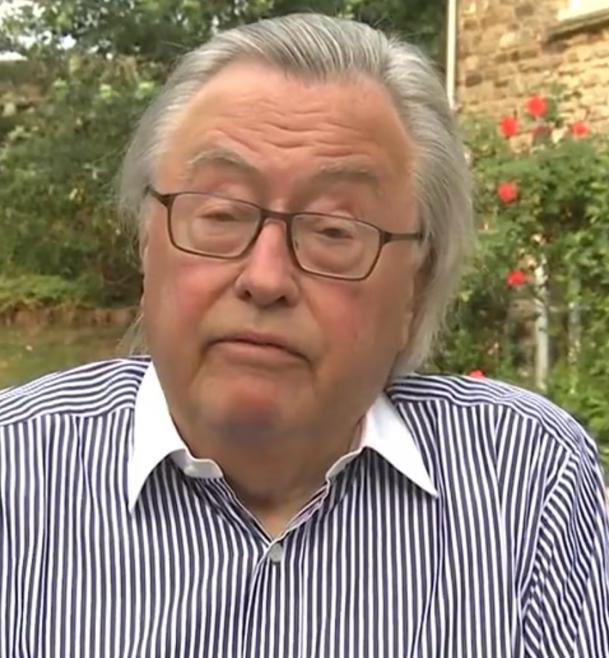
- David Mellor in 2023

Secretary of State for National Heritage
- In office 11 April 1992 – 24 September 1992
- Prime Minister: John Major
- Preceded by: Office established
- Succeeded by: Peter Brooke

Chief Secretary to the Treasury
- In office 28 November 1990 – 11 April 1992
- Prime Minister: John Major
- Chancellor: Norman Lamont
- Preceded by: Norman Lamont
- Succeeded by: Michael Portillo

Minister for the Arts
- In office 26 July 1990 – 28 November 1990
- Prime Minister: Margaret Thatcher
- Preceded by: Richard Luce
- Succeeded by: Tim Renton

Minister of State for Home Affairs
- In office 27 October 1989 – 26 July 1990
- Prime Minister: Margaret Thatcher
- Preceded by: John Patten
- Succeeded by: Angela Rumbold

Minister of State for Health
- In office 25 July 1988 – 27 October 1989
- Prime Minister: Margaret Thatcher
- Preceded by: Tony Newton
- Succeeded by: Anthony Trafford

Minister of State for Foreign and Commonwealth Affairs
- In office 13 June 1987 – 25 July 1988
- Prime Minister: Margaret Thatcher
- Preceded by: Tim Renton
- Succeeded by: William Waldegrave

Member of Parliament for Putney
- In office 3 May 1979 – 8 April 1997
- Preceded by: Hugh Jenkins
- Succeeded by: Tony Colman

Personal details
- Born: 12 March 1949 (age 77) Wareham, Dorset, England
- Party: None
- Other political affiliations: Conservative (until 2003)
- Spouse: Judith Mellor (m. 1974; div. 1995)
- Domestic partner: Penelope Lyttelton, Viscountess Cobham
- Children: 2
- Education: Christ's College, Cambridge
- Profession: Barrister – not practising

David John Mellor (born 12 March 1949) is a British broadcaster, barrister, and former politician. As a member of the Conservative Party, he served in the Cabinet of Prime Minister John Major as Chief Secretary to the Treasury (1990–1992) and Secretary of State for National Heritage (April–September 1992), before resigning in 1992. He was the Member of Parliament (MP) for Putney from 1979 to 1997. Since leaving Parliament, Mellor has worked as a newspaper columnist, a radio presenter, and an after-dinner speaker. He also served as Chairman of the government's Football Task Force.

== Education and early career ==
Born in Wareham, Dorset, in 1949, Mellor was educated at Swanage Grammar School, and Christ's College, Cambridge, during which time he was chairman of the Cambridge University Conservative Association and a contestant on University Challenge. After briefly working for Jeffrey Archer (at the time a Member of Parliament) while studying for his bar exams, Mellor was called to the bar in 1972. He ceased to practise in 1979 upon being elected as an MP, and he remains "non-practising". He was appointed Queen's Counsel in 1987. (Note: The practice of courtesy appointments as Queen's Counsel for members of parliament was discontinued in the 1990s, however it remains for law officers of the Crown.)

== Parliamentary career ==
After contesting West Bromwich East in the general election in October 1974, Mellor became the MP for Putney in the general election of 1979, and held the seat until 1997.

=== Government minister ===
Mellor was made Parliamentary Under-Secretary of State at the Department of Energy in 1981. In 1983, Mellor was appointed as a minister in the Home Office where he was involved in several pieces of legislation, including the Police and Criminal Evidence Act 1984 and the Prosecution of Offences Act 1985 (which established the Crown Prosecution Service). He was also involved with legislation enabling the re-investigation of miscarriages of justice, and with the Animals (Scientific Procedures) Act 1986.

In 1987, Mellor was moved to the Foreign and Commonwealth Office by Thatcher, and was made responsible for the Middle East, Eastern Europe, and the Soviet Union (before the revolutions of 1989). At this point he made an extended appearance on the Channel 4 discussion programme After Dark speaking about the Mafia. Mellor was briefly Minister of State for Health in 1988–1989, during the Third Thatcher ministry. In this position, he was convinced by Graham Fraser to launch a national cochlear implants programme for people suffering from severe hearing loss.

Mellor was made a Privy Counsellor in 1990 by Thatcher, shortly before she resigned as Prime Minister. Mellor was briefly Minister for the Arts in 1990 before entering John Major's new Cabinet as Chief Secretary to the Treasury in November of that year. He was interviewed in December 1991 on the TV programme Hard News following the establishment of the Calcutt Review inquiring into Press Standards. Mellor said during the interview that "the press – the popular press – is drinking in the last chance saloon" and called for curbs on the "sacred cow" of press freedom to curb their more extreme activities.

Following the 1992 general election, Mellor remained a Cabinet Minister as Secretary of State for National Heritage in the newly created Department of National Heritage (now the Department for Culture, Media and Sport), during which period he was occasionally referred to as the "Minister for Fun" after comments he made to the waiting press on leaving 10 Downing Street on his appointment.

=== Resignation ===
In July 1992 Mellor's former mistress, actress Antonia de Sancha, sold her "kiss and tell" story of Mellor's extra-marital affair with her for £35,000. Their telephone conversations had been secretly recorded by de Sancha's landlord, an activity which at the time was legal in England. The Sun, relying on material supplied by the publicist Max Clifford, made a number of untrue claims about the relationship, that de Sancha later admitted. This was subsequently confirmed by David Mellor in 2011 at the Leveson Inquiry into Press Behaviour.

The Prime Minister John Major supported Mellor, but the media maintained their interest. A libel case brought by Mona Bauwens against The People, which came to the High Court in September 1992, led to the revelation that Mellor had accepted the gift of a month-long holiday in Marbella from Bauwens for his family, which took place in August 1990. Mellor's connection to Bauwens, the daughter of Jaweed al-Ghussein, the finance director of the PLO (formally the Palestine National Fund), maintained the pressure on him. Mellor resigned on 24 September 1992.

=== Defeat at 1997 general election ===
Mellor contested the 1997 general election, but was defeated by the Labour Party's Tony Colman as one of the most notable Tory casualties as Labour won by a landslide to end nearly 20 years of Conservative government. The election night was memorable for Mellor's bad-tempered showdown with the Referendum Party founder Sir James Goldsmith: after Mellor declared during his concession speech that "as for some of the rest of the candidates assembled here, even as [sic] a fellow of the Zoological Society did not prepare me for this", Mellor was taunted by Goldsmith and Michael Yardley, the Spokesperson for the Sportsman's Alliance, who gave him a slow hand clap and shouted "Out! Out! Out!". Mellor retorted:

... and Sir James ... has got nothing to be smug about, and I would like to say that 1,500 votes is a derisory total. We have shown tonight that the Referendum Party is dead in the water, and Sir James can get off back to Mexico knowing your attempt to buy the British political system has failed!

== After Parliament ==
Mellor was chairman of the incoming Labour government's 'Football Task Force' from August 1997 until its dissolution in 1999. Among the recommendations accepted by the Labour government and introduced into law was the criminalisation of racial abuse by an individual spectator, as distinct from a group. Mellor has also pursued a career in journalism, and has written columns for six national newspapers including the Evening Standard, The Guardian and The People, often on current affairs, but also his specialist interests of sport and the arts. He regularly presented football-related programmes on BBC Radio 5 until 2001, and classical music programmes on BBC Radio 2 and BBC Radio 3 for six years. Since 2000, he has also been a radio presenter at Classic FM.

Mellor is an opera and classical music critic for the newspaper The Mail on Sunday. He is a regular contributor to the radio station LBC, on which he previously co-hosted a Saturday morning politics and current affairs discussion programme for eight years with former London Mayor Ken Livingstone. This continued until 2016, when Livingstone was sacked and Mellor's contract was not renewed.

In June 2010, it was reported in The Daily Telegraph and the Daily Mirror that Mellor called a chef a "fat bastard" during a licensing wrangle at the River Lounge restaurant near his home at St Katharine Docks, East London. The articles claimed Mellor used bad language and told the chef he should "do his £10-an-hour job somewhere else". In November 2014 The Daily Telegraph and The Independent reported that Mellor had been secretly recorded by a taxi driver, saying "you think that your experiences are anything compared to mine?" In the secret recording of an encounter on 21 November, Mellor and the cab driver argue over which is the better route to their destination. The article alleged that he swore at the driver. Mellor later told the media that he regretted losing his temper but blamed the driver for provoking him.

== Private life ==
Mellor married Judith Hall in Worthing on 20 July 1974. The couple had two sons before divorcing in 1995. Mellor lives with his partner, Penelope Lyttelton, Viscountess Cobham.

== Notes ==
Parliament of the United Kingdom
Preceded by Hugh Jenkins	Member of Parliament for Putney; 1979–1997	Succeeded by Tony Colman
Political offices
Preceded by Richard Luce	Minister of State for the Arts; 1990	Succeeded by Tim Renton
Preceded by Norman Lamont	Chief Secretary to the Treasury; 1990–1992	Succeeded by Michael Portillo
New office	Secretary of State for National Heritage; 1992	Succeeded by Peter Brooke
