= Michael Stephen =

Barrie Michael Lace Stephen, known as Michael Stephen (born 25 September 1942), is a British former Conservative Member of Parliament (MP).

== Early life ==
Stephen was called to the Bar by the Inner Temple in 1966. In the same year he was commissioned into The Life Guards and served in the Far East, London, Windsor, and Northern Ireland until 1970. In that year he was awarded a Harkness Fellowship to read International Law in the United States, and earned a Master's degree from Stanford University. He was a postgraduate student at Harvard Law School from 1971 to 1972, where he wrote "Natural Justice at the United Nations" 67 Am. J. Int. Law 479. He was Assistant Legal Adviser to the UK delegation to the UN for the 26th General Assembly. On returning to England, he practised at the Bar in London, specialising in commercial law. In 1989, he married Virginia Mary de Trense. They live in Chelsea, and he is Vice-chairman of The Chelsea Society. Whilst in Parliament he served on the Environment Select Committee, and after leaving Parliament he joined the Board of Symphony Environmental Technologies Plc.

== Parliamentary career ==
Stephen contested the Labour stronghold of Doncaster North in 1983. He was elected MP for Shoreham in 1992 and served until 1997, when his seat was abolished by boundary changes. He did not seek re-election at the 1997 general election, returning to his legal career. He is the author of the Bail (Amendment) Act 1993 which authorised appeals against grants of bail by magistrates, and s.36 of the Criminal Justice Act 1988 which authorised appeals against over-lenient sentences.

Parliament of the United Kingdom
Preceded by Richard Luce	Member of Parliament for Shoreham; 1992–1997	Constituency abolished
