= Arundel and Shoreham =

Former parliamentary constituency in the United Kingdom

- Former borough constituency for the House of Commons
- County: West Sussex
- Major settlements: Littlehampton, Arundel and Shoreham-by-Sea

1950–1974
- Seats: 1
- Created from: Chichester, Horsham and Worthing
- Replaced by: Arundel and Shoreham

Arundel and Shoreham was a borough constituency of the House of Commons of the Parliament of the United Kingdom.

It was created for the 1950 general election, and abolished for the February 1974 general election, when it was divided to create the constituencies of Arundel and Shoreham.

== Members of Parliament ==
Election	Member	Party	Notes
1950	William Cuthbert	Conservative	Resigned January 1954
1954 by-election	Henry Kerby	Conservative	Died January 1971
1971 by-election	Richard Luce	Conservative	Subsequently, MP for Shoreham
Feb 1974	Constituency abolished: see Arundel & Shoreham		

== Boundaries ==
- 1950–1970: The Municipal Borough of Arundel; the Urban Districts of Littlehampton, Shoreham-by-Sea, and Southwick; and the Rural Districts of Chanctonbury, and Worthing.
- 1970–1974: The Municipal Borough of Arundel; the Urban Districts of Bognor Regis, and Littlehampton; and parts of the Rural Districts of Chichester, and Worthing.

== Election results ==
=== Elections in the 1950s ===
General election 1950: Arundel and Shoreham
Party	Candidate	Votes	%	±%
Conservative	William Cuthbert	30,774	58.2	
Labour	T Parsons	15,220	28.8	
Liberal	Howard Stuart Beardmore	6,879	13.0	
Majority		15,554	29.4	
Turnout		52,873	82.9	
Conservative win (new seat)				

General election 1951: Arundel and Shoreham
Party	Candidate	Votes	%	±%
Conservative	William Cuthbert	34,946	67.4	+9.2
Labour	Margaret Reid	16,923	32.6	+3.8
Majority		18,023	34.8	+5.4
Turnout		51,869	78.0	−4.9
Conservative hold		Swing		

1954 Arundel and Shoreham by-election
Party	Candidate	Votes	%	±%
Conservative	Henry Kerby	24,857	68.52	+1.1
Labour	Margaret Reid	11,420	31.48	−1.1
Majority		13,437	37.04	+2.2
Turnout		36,277		
Conservative hold		Swing		

General election 1955: Arundel and Shoreham
Party	Candidate	Votes	%	±%
Conservative	Henry Kerby	35,180	69.9	+2.5
Labour	Frank W Banfield	15,188	30.2	−2.4
Majority		19,992	30.7	−4.1
Turnout		50,368	73.0	−5.0
Conservative hold		Swing		

General election 1959: Arundel and Shoreham
Party	Candidate	Votes	%	±%
Conservative	Henry Kerby	37,034	64.0	−5.9
Labour	Arthur L Bell	12,745	22.0	−8.2
Liberal	Albert L Ford	8,081	14.0	New
Majority		24,289	41.2	+10.5
Turnout		57,860	76.5	+3.5
Conservative hold		Swing		

=== Elections in the 1960s ===
General election 1964: Arundel and Shoreham
Party	Candidate	Votes	%	±%
Conservative	Henry Kerby	36,943	57.5	−6.5
Labour	Anthony AR Thompson	15,624	24.3	+2.3
Liberal	Peter M Bulwer	11,671	18.2	+4.2
Majority		21,319	33.2	−8.0
Turnout		64,238	76.5	0.0
Conservative hold		Swing		

General election 1966: Arundel and Shoreham
Party	Candidate	Votes	%	±%
Conservative	Henry Kerby	36,913	55.5	−2.0
Labour	Roger R Kenward	18,817	28.9	+4.6
Liberal	Peter M Bulwer	10,816	16.3	−1.9
Majority		18,096	26.6	−6.6
Turnout		66,546	75.8	−0.7
Conservative hold		Swing		

=== Elections in the 1970s ===
General election 1970: Arundel and Shoreham
Party	Candidate	Votes	%	±%
Conservative	Henry Kerby	43,907	60.8	+5.3
Labour	Barry M Lyne	16,531	22.9	−6.0
Liberal	Peter Bartram	11,769	16.3	0.0
Majority		27,376	37.9	+11.3
Turnout		72,207	71.8	−4.0
Conservative hold		Swing		

1971 Arundel and Shoreham by-election
Party	Candidate	Votes	%	±%
Conservative	Richard Luce	34,482	64.1	+3.3
Labour	Roger R Kenward	11,228	20.9	−2.0
Liberal	Peter Bartram	7,917	14.7	−1.6
Independent	George Thomas	191	0.4	New
Majority		23,254	43.2	+5.3
Turnout		53,818		
Conservative hold		Swing		
