= Henry Kerby =

Henry Briton Kerby (11 December 1914 – 4 January 1971) was a British Conservative member of parliament for Arundel and Shoreham. He won the seat in a 1954 by-election, and served until his death.

Kerby was born in Russia and spent his early years in Europe. Upon coming to Britain during his youth, he was educated at the Highgate School. He served in the British Army, where he was a captain, and worked in the War Office during World War II. For a time he was associated with the National Fellowship group. He spoke Russian fluently and was an interpreter when Nikolai Bulganin and Nikita Khrushchev made an official visit to the United Kingdom in 1956.

Before joining the Conservative Party, Kerby was a Liberal politician. He contested Spelthorne at the 1945 general election as a Liberal and Swansea West at the 1951 general election as a Conservative.

Kerby married Enid Herchenroder in 1947, and they had two children. He had a heart attack in February 1970, but had recovered and continued his political career at the time. He died at his home in Yapton less than a year later, on 4 January 1971, aged 56. At the subsequent by-election, his seat was successfully retained by the Conservative candidate, Richard Luce.

Parliament of the United Kingdom
| Preceded by William Cuthbert | Member of Parliament for Arundel & Shoreham; 1954 – 1971 | Succeeded by Richard Luce |
