= Tim Renton =

British Conservative politician (1932–2020)

The Right Honourable The Lord Renton of Mount Harry PC DL
- Renton in Parliament, 2013
Ministerial offices 1984–1992
Minister of State for the Arts
In office 28 November 1990 – 11 April 1992
Prime Minister	John Major
Preceded by	David Mellor
Succeeded by	David Mellor (as Secretary of State for National Heritage)
Government Chief Whip in the House of Commons; Parliamentary Secretary to the Treasury
In office 24 July 1989 – 28 November 1990
Prime Minister	Margaret Thatcher
Preceded by	David Waddington
Succeeded by	Richard Ryder
Minister of State for Immigration
In office 13 June 1987 – 25 July 1989
Prime Minister	Margaret Thatcher
Preceded by	David Waddington
Succeeded by	Peter Lloyd
Minister of State for Foreign and Commonwealth Affairs
In office 2 September 1985 – 13 June 1987
Prime Minister	Margaret Thatcher
Preceded by	Richard Luce
Succeeded by	David Mellor
Parliamentary Under-Secretary of State for Foreign and Commonwealth Affairs
In office 11 September 1984 – 1 September 1985
Prime Minister	Margaret Thatcher
Preceded by	Ray Whitney
Succeeded by	Tim Eggar

Member of the House of Lords
- Lord Temporal
- Life peerage 9 June 1997 – 14 April 2016

Member of Parliament for Mid Sussex
- In office 28 February 1974 – 8 April 1997
- Preceded by: Constituency established
- Succeeded by: Nicholas Soames

Personal details
- Born: Ronald Timothy Renton; 28 May 1932 London, England
- Died: 25 August 2020 (aged 88) Offham, East Sussex, England
- Party: Conservative
- Spouse: Alice Fergusson (m. 1960)
- Children: 5, including Alex and Polly
- Education: Eton College; Magdalen College, Oxford

Ronald Timothy Renton, Baron Renton of Mount Harry, PC, DL (28 May 1932 – 25 August 2020) was a British Conservative Party politician.

== Early life ==
Tim Renton, who rarely used his first name of Ronald, was born in London. He attended Sunningdale School and then Eton, where he was a King's Scholar. He was an undergraduate at Magdalen College, Oxford on the Roberts Gawen scholarship, and earned a first-class degree in History.

== Parliamentary career ==
After unsuccessfully contesting Sheffield Park in 1970, he was Conservative Member of Parliament for Mid-Sussex from 1974 to 1997.

He served as a Minister of State in both the Foreign Office and the Home Office, and served as Margaret Thatcher's Chief Whip (Parliamentary Secretary to the Treasury) between 1989 and 1990. Following Thatcher's resignation in 1990 he served in John Major's government as Minister for the Arts between 1990 and 1992. During this time, he came up with the idea of a National Lottery. This was later adopted as a government policy. He launched National Music Day (UK) with Mick Jagger which ran from 1992 until around 1997. He served as Parliamentary Private Secretary to Geoffrey Howe and to John Biffen, the Trade Secretary but resigned from that position in 1981 after he refused to support the government on a vote about a retrospective windfall tax on bank profits.

After standing down from the Commons at the 1997 General Election, he was created a life peer in the 1997 Dissolution Honours; on 9 June 1997 as Baron Renton of Mount Harry, of Offham in the County of East Sussex, and took his seat in the House of Lords. He retired from the House on 14 April 2016.

== Personal life ==
In 1960, he married Alice Blanche Helen Fergusson, daughter of Sir James Fergusson, 8th Baronet of Kilkerran. The couple lived in Offham near Lewes in East Sussex and had a holiday home on the Hebridean island of Tiree.

Their four surviving children are Alex Renton, a journalist and author, Christian Louise, Daniel Charles Antony, an environmentalist, and (Katherine) Chelsea, who is an artist and author. The couple's youngest daughter, Polly Renton (Penelope Sally Rosita), a documentary film maker, died in a car accident in 2010.

Renton died from cancer at his home in Offham on 25 August 2020, aged 88.

== Bibliography ==
- The Dangerous Edge, Hutchinson, 1994, ISBN 0-09-179151-0
- Hostage to Fortune, Arrow, 1998, ISBN 0-09-946831-X
- Chief Whip, Politico's, 2005, ISBN 1-84275-129-8

Parliament of the United Kingdom
New constituency	Member of Parliament for Mid Sussex; 1974–1997	Succeeded by Nicholas Soames
Political offices
Preceded by David Waddington	Chief Whip of the Conservative Party; 1989–1990	Succeeded by Richard Ryder
Preceded by David Waddington	Parliamentary Secretary to the Treasury; 1989–1990	Succeeded by Richard Ryder
Preceded by David Mellor	Minister of State for the Arts; 1990–1992	Succeeded by David Mellor
