= Frances Donaldson =

British writer and biographer (1907–94)

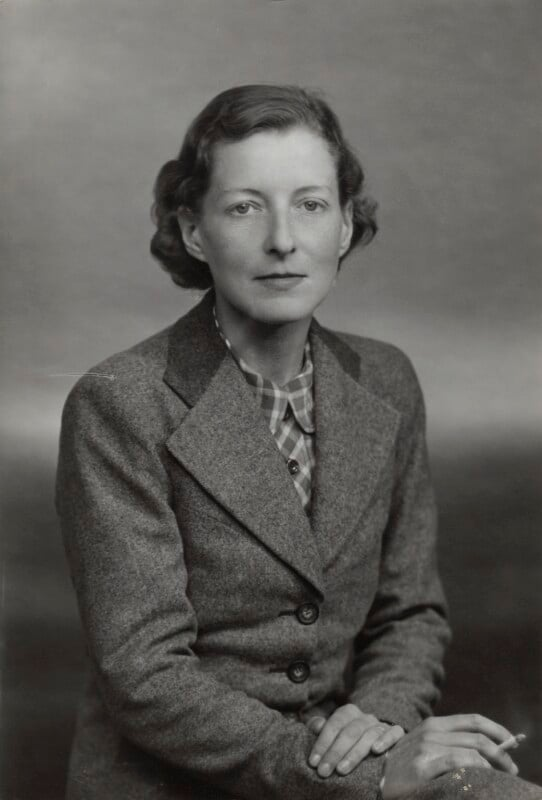
Donaldson in the 1940s

Frances Annesley, Lady Donaldson of Kingsbridge (née Lonsdale; 13 January 1907 – 27 March 1994), was a British writer and biographer.

== Biography ==
Her father was the playwright Frederick Lonsdale and her mother was Leslie Brooke (née Hoggan). She made an unsuccessful marriage to Ronald McKenzie Cardwell in 1927. In 1935, she married her second husband, John George Stuart Donaldson, known as Jack, who became Baron Donaldson of Kingsbridge in 1967. They had three children, a daughter and two sons.

During the Second World War when her husband was away she successfully took up farming, producing record crop and milk yields. She was invited to broadcast in wartime and wrote several books about her experiences.

Her body of work included topics such as farming and biographies on writers Evelyn Waugh and P. G. Wodehouse, and King Edward VIII.

She died of cancer on 27 March 1994 in London.

== Works ==
- Approach to Farming (1941)
- Four Years Harvest (1945)
- Milk Without Tears (1955)
- Farming in Britain Today (1969) with J. G. S. Donaldson and Derek Barber
- Freddy Lonsdale (1957) – Lady Donaldson's biography of her father, "praised for its balance of candor and affection"
- Child of the Twenties (1962)
- The Marconi Scandal (1962)
- Evelyn Waugh: Portrait of a Country Neighbour (1967) – An appreciation, rather than a comprehensive biography
- Actor Managers (1970)
- Edward VIII (Weidenfeld & Nicolson, 1974) – Won the Wolfson History Prize in 1974, and was the basis for the seven-part television series Edward & Mrs. Simpson (1978), starring her nephew actor Edward Fox as Edward
- P. G. Wodehouse (1982)
- Yours Plum (1990) Letters of P. G. Wodehouse
- The British Council: the First Fifty Years (1984)
- The Royal Opera House in the 20th Century (1988)
- A Twentieth-Century Life (1992)
- Frances Donaldson: A Woman's War (2017), an edition of her letters, written in 1939–1945 to her husband
