= Polly Renton =

British documentary film maker (1970–2010)

The Honourable Polly Renton (4 March 1970 – 28 May 2010), born Penelope Sally Rosita Renton, was a British documentary film maker and proponent of ethical journalism, who played an important part in transforming political television in East Africa and trained a generation of African television journalists through her Nairobi based NGO, MEDEVA (Media Development in Africa).

== Early life and education ==
Penelope (‘Polly’) Sally Rosita Renton was born in Brighton on 4 March 1970, the youngest of the five children of Tim Renton (later Baron Renton of Mount Harry), a Conservative MP and Chief Whip to Margaret Thatcher, and his wife Alice (née Fergusson), a novelist and historian. She was named, in part, after her great-aunt, the novelist and explorer Rosita Forbes.

Her siblings include the investigative journalist and author Alex Renton and the artist and cartoonist Chelsea Renton.

She was educated at Windlesham House School and Roedean before going up to Magdalen College, Oxford to read Modern Languages. After university she spent time in Guatemala helping to rescue children from prostitution before threats to her life forced her to leave the country.

== Career ==
In 1994 Renton abandoned an 18-month career in the pharmaceuticals industry to work as a researcher for Peter Kosminsky on his sexual abuse docu-drama, No Child of Mine (1997), at Yorkshire Television. She directed her first two documentary films, My Mate Charlie (2000), about the rise in the use of cocaine in Britain, and Waiting for Sentence (2001), which explored prison life, for Channel 4's Doing Time series. Her next film, Sex Bomb (2002), dealt with sexually transmitted diseases among British teenagers and won the Royal Television Society's award for Best Independent Programme in 2002.

Polly Renton was adept at getting the very best out of her interviewees, giving them the confidence to speak openly about their experiences. She was a tenacious yet compassionate director, and her humour and kindness were evident even in the bleakest filming situations.

— Obituary, The Telegraph

=== MEDEVA ===
Renton moved to Kenya after holidaying there in 2000 and is credited with playing a major role in the transformation of the country’s television. Disillusioned by the poor quality of television journalism available and the restrictions on it, Renton obtained funding from the Ford Foundation to set up a non-governmental organisation, Media Development in Africa (MEDEVA), in Nairobi. MEDEVA’s objective was to train Kenyan film makers and journalists and it went on to produce five series of the current affairs magazine show Tazama! (Swahili for ‘Look’), Kenya’s most popular show after the news with four million weekly viewers, and three seasons of Agenda Kenya, a political talk show in the vein of Question Time, for which she was advised by family friend David Dimbleby.

Polly’s idea of producing this kind of programme was much harder to do in a country like Kenya, which doesn’t have a tradition of public criticism. It was an act of huge courage and determination. I remember people were quite sceptical that she could even get it on air.

— David Dimbleby

The incendiary nature of the political discussions on Agenda Kenya meant it often had to be filmed in the presence of armed guards. On one occasion an unrelated power cut led to student demonstrations in the streets in the belief that the government had taken the programme off air.

The audience on Agenda Kenya has been spectacularly brave and articulate. In the UK politics is often about schools or taxes, but here politics is life and death. It’s about whether you have access to justice or food or get caught up in some tribal skirmish.

— Polly Renton, speaking about Agenda Kenya

By 2008 MEDEVA had trained more than 100 young Kenyans to become ethical television reporters, producers, editors and sound and camera technicians.

In 2009 she produced a series of films for the Department for International Development with her brother, journalist Alex Renton, dealing with issues affecting East Africa. At the time of her death in 2010 she was slated to work with the BBC's Comic Relief on a series of films about poverty in the slums of Kibera.

== Personal life ==
Renton was a rower and a violinist at university.

Her father’s life peerage in 1997 entitled her to the style ‘The Honourable’.

In 2005 in Kenya she married Toby Fenwick-Wilson, a safari manager and guide who hailed, as she did, from Sussex. The couple had a daughter, Rosita, and a son, Tristan, and settled at Ulu, where they helped set up a conservation area, a ranger service and a health clinic.

Polly was a woman of tireless enthusiasm and integrity. While she would rarely turn down the opportunity for a cocktail at sundown, or a party on a dhow off the Kenyan coast, she nevertheless experienced Kenya in a way many of the "Happy Valley" white Kenyans never aspired to, helping to change and improve the lives of black Kenyans through her work and charitable projects. At her funeral in Ulu, hundreds of people from all walks of life came to pay their respects.

— Obituary, The Guardian, by her friend and colleague Alice Keens-Soper

== Death and legacy ==
On 28 May 2010 she and her four-year-old daughter, Rosita (‘Sita’) Fenwick-Wilson, were killed in a car crash as she drove to interview nurses at a remote medical clinic in Kenya. Her one-year-old son and his nanny were also in the car but survived the crash.

The Rosita Trust was set up in 2011 in memory of Renton and her daughter, Rosita, principally to carry on the running of MEDEVA, which continued to train journalists in Uganda, Tanzania and Rwanda as well as Kenya for several years. The trust's patrons were David Dimbleby, David Frost and David Puttnam.
