= Norman St John-Stevas =

English politician (1929–2012)

The Right Honourable The Lord St John of Fawsley PC FRSL
- St John-Stevas in 1968

Minister of State for the Arts
- In office 5 May 1979 – 5 January 1981
- Prime Minister: Margaret Thatcher
- Preceded by: The Lord Donaldson of Kingsbridge
- Succeeded by: Paul Channon
- In office 2 December 1973 – 4 March 1974
- Prime Minister: Edward Heath
- Preceded by: The Viscount Eccles
- Succeeded by: Hugh Jenkins

Leader of the House of Commons
- In office 5 May 1979 – 5 January 1981
- Prime Minister: Margaret Thatcher
- Preceded by: Michael Foot
- Succeeded by: Francis Pym

Chancellor of the Duchy of Lancaster
- In office 5 May 1979 – 5 January 1981
- Prime Minister: Margaret Thatcher
- Preceded by: Harold Lever
- Succeeded by: Francis Pym

Shadow Leader of the House of Commons
- In office 6 November 1978 – 4 May 1979
- Leader: Margaret Thatcher
- Preceded by: Francis Pym
- Succeeded by: Michael Foot

Shadow Secretary of State for Education and Science
- In office 28 February 1974 – 6 November 1978
- Leader: Edward Heath; Margaret Thatcher
- Preceded by: William van Straubenzee
- Succeeded by: Mark Carlisle

Member of the House of Lords
- Lord Temporal
- Life peerage 19 October 1987 – 5 March 2012

Member of Parliament for Chelmsford
- In office 15 October 1964 – 18 May 1987
- Preceded by: Hubert Ashton
- Succeeded by: Simon Burns

Personal details
- Born: Norman Panayea St John Stevas; 18 May 1929 London, England
- Died: 2 March 2012 (aged 82) London, England
- Party: Conservative
- Domestic partner: Adrian Stanford (1956–2012) Civil partnership 2008
- Education: Fitzwilliam College, Cambridge (BA); Christ Church, Oxford (BCL); University of London (PhD); Yale University (JSD); Middle Temple

Norman Antony Francis St John-Stevas, Baron St John of Fawsley, PC, FRSL (/ˌsɪndʒən ˈstiːvəs/ sin-jən-STEE-vəs; born Norman Panayea St John Stevas; 18 May 1929 – 2 March 2012) was a British Conservative politician, author and barrister. He served as Leader of the House of Commons in the government of Prime Minister Margaret Thatcher from 1979 to 1981. He was Member of Parliament (MP) for Chelmsford from 1964 to 1987 and was made a life peer in 1987. His surname was created by compounding those of his father (Stevas) and mother (St John-O'Connor).

== Early life ==
St John-Stevas was born in London. His birth certificate specified that his Christian names were Norman Panayea St John, and that his father was Spyro Stevas, a hotel proprietor of Greek origin. In his Who's Who entry, he gave his father as Stephen Stevas, an engineer and company director. His mother was Kitty St John O'Connor. His parents divorced, whereupon his mother hyphenated the name St John. He was reputedly closer to his mother than to his father. His older sister was the actress Juno Alexander, first wife of actor Terence Alexander.

St John-Stevas was educated at St Joseph's Salesian School, Burwash, East Sussex, and then at the Catholic school Ratcliffe College, Leicester. He was active in the Young Conservatives as a speaker for Conservative and Catholic causes. He was a contemporary of Gordon Reece, whom he reported to his superiors for atheism.

Subsequently, he was for six months enrolled at the English College, Rome, a seminary for the Roman Catholic priesthood, but found that he had no vocation. He remained a Catholic throughout his life, however. He then read law at what was then Fitzwilliam House, now Fitzwilliam College, Cambridge. As an undergraduate, he lived at St Edmund's House (now St Edmund's College, which at the time was a predominantly Roman Catholic institution) and served as President of the Cambridge Union in 1950. He graduated with first- class honours and won the Whitlock Prize.

He studied also at the University of Oxford, where he gained second-class honours in the examination for the BCL degree at Christ Church and was the Secretary of the Oxford Union. He then studied for a PhD degree from the University of London with a thesis titled A study of censorship with special reference to the law governing obscene publications in common law and other jurisdictions (on the early work of Walter Bagehot) and a JSD degree from Yale University. He was called to the Bar at the Middle Temple in 1952.

== Academic and legal career ==
St John-Stevas was appointed as a lecturer at Southampton University (1952–1953) and King's College London (1953–1956). He then went to Oxford University to tutor in Jurisprudence at Christ Church (1953–1955) and Merton College (1955–1957). He also lectured in the United States and held a visiting professorship at the University of California, Santa Barbara. From 1954 to 1959 he was legal adviser to Sir Alan Herbert's Committee on book censorship.

St John-Stevas also won many prizes and scholarships: the Blackstone and Harmsworth Scholarship (1952); the Blackstone Prize (1953); the Yorke Prize of Cambridge University (1957); a fellowship at Yale Law School (1958); a Fulbright award; and a Fund for the Republic fellowship (1958).

In 1956, his book Obscenity and the Law was published. This "became a key work of reference during subsequent reforms" and also "reflected an intellectual shift toward the law's retreat from the pulpit". He also wrote Life, Death and the Law (1961), The Right to Life (1963) and The Law and Morals (1964). These were "earnest...with a liberal Catholic lawyer addressing difficult questions in a thoughtful spirit".

In 1959, he joined The Economist and became its Legal and Political Correspondent. St John-Stevas edited the collected works of the Victorian journalist and politician Walter Bagehot. Between 1965 and 1986, The Economist itself published his edition "to great acclaim", what have been called fifteen "beautifully produced and highly regarded volumes". These volumes have been labelled Stevas's "memorial".

== Politician ==
A founding member of the Conservative Bow Group, in 1951 St John-Stevas stood unsuccessfully for the safe Labour seat of Dagenham. He was later elected as Member of Parliament for the safe Conservative seat of Chelmsford in Essex at the 1964 general election holding this seat until stepping down at the 1987 general election. In later elections, the seat became marginal, and his majority at his final election contest in 1983 was less than a thousand votes.

He opposed Sir Anthony Eden's invasion of Suez in 1956, was a long-standing opponent of capital punishment and immigration restrictions based on race, and favoured a relaxation of the obscenity laws. Owing to his Catholic views, he opposed Leo Abse's Divorce Bill and David Steel's Abortion Bill. In 1966, he was a co-sponsor of Abse's private member's bill to reform the law to permit homosexual acts between consenting adults, which became the Sexual Offences Act 1967.

In the later stages of Prime Minister Edward Heath's government, St John-Stevas was Parliamentary Under Secretary of State at the Department of Education and Science (where Margaret Thatcher was the Secretary of State), and the Minister for the Arts (1973–1974).

Following the defeat of Heath's government, St John-Stevas supported Heath in the first ballot of the 1975 Conservative Party leadership election but switched his vote to Thatcher in the second ballot. He then served as a member of the shadow cabinet from 1974 to 1979, being the Shadow Spokesman for Education between 1975 and 1978. His deputy was Sir Rhodes Boyson, a working-class Thatcherite from Lancashire. Stevas and Boyson did not get along and loathed each other. Stevas gave Boyson the ironic nickname "Colossus". He became Shadow Leader of the House of Commons in 1978. When the Conservative Party was returned to power at the 1979 general election, he was appointed as Minister for the Arts for a second time from 1979 to 1981, while simultaneously holding the roles of Leader of the House of Commons and Chancellor of the Duchy of Lancaster.

In his role as Leader of the House, he has been credited with the creation of the House of Commons' system of select committees. These committees enable backbench MPs to hold ministers to account, and exert considerable influence within Parliament. In January 1981, St John-Stevas was the first of the Tory "wets" to be dismissed from the Cabinet by Margaret Thatcher (whom he had previously nicknamed "Tina" for her "there is no alternative" rhetoric). Thatcher explained to Roy Strong, "Norman was too much", and added, "Look at the way he'd done his office up. No sense of economy".

Now on the backbenches, Stevas remained loyal to Thatcher whilst criticising Thatcherite economic policies: "He was a One Nation Conservative who looked to Disraeli rather than Milton Friedman". In 1984 his book The Two Cities was published, in which he said that Thatcher could see "everything in black and white [but] the universe I inhabit is made up of many shades of grey". He continued his interest in Parliamentary accountability, in 1983, he won the ballot for private members' bills and brought in the bill which became the National Audit Act 1983 establishing the UK's National Audit Office and making it clear that the Comptroller and Auditor General, its head, was an officer of the House of Commons with rights to inspect the value for money of government spending.

St John-Stevas stood down from the House of Commons at the 1987 general election, being created a life peer in the House of Lords with the title Baron St John of Fawsley of Preston Capes in the County of Northamptonshire on 19 October 1987.

== Chairman of the Royal Fine Art Commission ==
He was Chairman of the Royal Fine Art Commission from 1985 to 1999. His tenure was wracked by controversy. It was hoped that his appointment would revitalise and popularise the commission, which had not even produced an annual report for many years. Stevas succeeded in "inject[ing] a bit of panache and excitement" into the commission. However, it also became a mouthpiece for Lord St John of Fawsley's own views and preferences (most prominently in the annual Building of the Year award). He adorned his office with paintings from national collections, documents were presented in red boxes and he was served by a chauffeur and ex-civil servants, in accommodation more lavish than that of most secretaries of state: prompting one commentator to quip that "if he cannot have power, he must have the trappings". The necessity of such extravagance was questioned in a government report by Sir Geoffrey Chipperfield.

The Commission strongly criticised the plans for the Millennium Wheel on London's South Bank even though three of the Commissioners were enthusiastic about it. After an ill-tempered meeting in which Stevas was allegedly rude to the Wheel's architects, Sherban Cantacuzino, the commission's secretary, wrote to the architects saying: "I am sure that he enjoys putting people down; all of us have suffered from his bullying".

Despite all predictions, in 1995 Stevas was reappointed for a third term as chairman.

== Master of Emmanuel College, Cambridge ==
His tenure as Master of Emmanuel College at Cambridge University (1991 to 1996) was at times controversial. He built a new lecture theatre with ancillary rooms (the Queen's Building) at the cost of some £8 million, the costs of which were pushed upwards by Lord St John's insistence on re-opening the quarries in Ketton, Rutland, to obtain limestone from the same source from which the college's Wren chapel was built. Some of the college's fellows apparently first had doubts about the wisdom of appointing Stevas when several of his friends were caught naked one night in the Fellows' Garden swimming pool.

Stevas succeeded in promoting the college through House and Garden and Hello!, although some fellows were angered when Mohammed al-Fayed, who had donated £250,000 to a new extension of the college, was rewarded with a "Harrods Room" and an honorary membership of the college, an honour Stevas invented. The relationship between Master and College worsened to the point that "one tutor started handing out copies of the Master's pronouncements in his role as 'constitutional expert' with a prize for the student who spotted the greatest number of legal mistakes".

Stevas's critics alleged that he spent too much time with a small clique of public school-educated young men who "were favoured with introductions to royalty and captains of industry, to dinners at White's, private theatrical performances at the Master's Lodge and long, affectionate letters". Stevas would also cut undergraduates off in mid-sentence with a cutting remark in Latin, and to members of other colleges, Emmanuel College gained the nickname "Mein Camp".

Following his retirement as Master he maintained his ties with Emmanuel College, which he used from time to time as a venue for events of the Royal Fine Art Commission Trust.

== Personal life ==
St John-Stevas was a prominent Roman Catholic. He was also Patron of the Anglican Society of King Charles the Martyr, and Grand Bailiff for England and Wales of the Military and Hospitaller Order of Saint Lazarus (statuted 1910).

He was chairman of the Catholic New Bearings group in the early 1970s, whose members included the Bishop Augustine Harris. New Bearings' purpose was to provide support to priests and nuns who were struggling with their vocation and operated independently from the church.

His partner of over fifty years was Adrian Stanford. They met in 1956 at Oxford, where St John-Stevas taught Stanford law. They entered into a civil partnership shortly before St John-Stevas's death.

He was noted for his many personal affectations, including proffering his hand in papal fashion, lapsing into Latin whilst speaking, and deliberately mispronouncing modern words. A loyal monarchist, Lord St John enjoyed a close relationship with the British royal family. Soon after his elevation to the Lords, photographs of him in purple bedroom slippers while he lounged in the bedroom of his former rectory home in Northampton with a signed photograph of Princess Margaret prominently displayed were published in Hello! magazine. All personal notes were written in purple ink. After his elevation to the Lords, he was an active member and used only official House of Lords-headed stationery. He lived in Montpelier Square, Knightsbridge, and had a house in Northamptonshire.

The Catholic Herald, a newspaper that St John-Stevas had contributed to on many occasions, wrote on his death that "Unlike a lot of people who have trodden the corridors of power, he was not in the least secretive about his experiences. He idolised the Queen Mother, Princess Margaret and Pius IX. His house in Northamptonshire was filled with relics and pictures of all three. He even had a cassock which was supposed to have belonged to the Blessed Pius, and ... on occasions, he wore it to fancy dress parties".

He died at his home in London on 2 March 2012, aged 82, after a short illness. His homosexuality was summarised by Simon Hoggart in The Guardian obituary note: "He lived in that period where gay politicians never came 'out', yet were happy for everyone to know. He lived life as a camp performance."

== Distinctions ==
- Grand Bailiff for England and Wales of the Order of Saint Lazarus (statuted 1910)
- Fellow of the Royal Society of Literature

== Arms ==
Coat of arms of Norman St John-Stevas

Coronet
Coronet of a baron
Crest
A Fallow Deer's Head erased proper in the mouth a Chaplet of Laurel Vert the Attires per fess the dexter Azure and Gules the sinister Gules and Azure
Escutcheon
Tierced in fess Azure Gules and Azure per pale counterchanged in the azure an Open Crown Or in the gules a Lion passant guardant Gold armed and langued Azure
Supporters
Dexter: a Monkey proper; Sinister: a Lion Argent winged Or, both crowned with a Crown Rayonny also Or and each rampant on a Grassy Mount the dexter having a Primrose growing therefrom the sinister a Lily all proper
Motto
Deus Nobiscum (God be with us)

== Bibliography ==
By Norman St John Stevas

- Walter Bagehot A study of his life & thought together with a selection from his political writings, Indiana University Press (1959)
- Life, Death and the Law, Indiana University Press (1961)
- The Right to Life, Holt, Rinehart & Winston (1963)
- Law and Morals, Hawthorn Books, New York (1964)
- Bagehot's Historical Essays, New York University Press (1966)
- Agonising Choice: Birth Control, Religion and Law, Eyre & Spottiswoode, London (1971)
- Pope John-Paul II: His Travels and Mission, Faber and Faber, London (1982)
- The Two Cities, Faber & Faber, London (1984)
- Before the Sunset Fades: An Autobiography, HarperCollins (2009)

Edited by Norman St John Stevas

- Bagehot, Walter, St John Stevas, Norman (Editor): The Collected Works of Walter Bagehot: Volumes 1–15, The Economist/ Harvard University Press (1965–1986)

Parliament of the United Kingdom
| Preceded by Hubert Ashton | Member of Parliament for Chelmsford; 1964–1987 | Succeeded by Simon Burns |
Political offices
| Preceded by The Viscount Eccles | Minister of State for the Arts; 1973–1974 | Succeeded by Hugh Jenkins |
| Preceded by Michael Foot | Leader of the House of Commons; 1979–1981 | Succeeded by Francis Pym |
| Preceded by Harold Lever | Chancellor of the Duchy of Lancaster; 1979–1981 | Succeeded by Francis Pym |
| Preceded by The Lord Donaldson of Kingsbridge | Minister of State for the Arts; 1979–1981 | Succeeded by Paul Channon |
Academic offices
| Preceded by Peter Wroth | Master of Emmanuel College, Cambridge; 1991–1996 | Succeeded by John Ffowcs Williams |
