= 1954 Arundel and Shoreham by-election =

UK Parliamentary by-election

The 1954 Arundel and Shoreham by-election was held on 9 March 1954. It was held due to the resignation of the incumbent Conservative MP, William Cuthbert. It was retained by the Conservative candidate, Henry Kerby.

== Result ==
Arundel and Shoreham by-election, 1954
Party	Candidate	Votes	%	±%
Conservative	Henry Kerby	24,857	68.52	+1.1
Labour	Margaret Reid	11,420	31.48	−1.1
Majority		13,437	37.04	+2.2
Turnout		36,277		
Conservative hold		Swing		

== Previous result ==
General election 1951: Arundel and Shoreham
Party	Candidate	Votes	%	±%
Conservative	William Cuthbert	34,946	67.4	+9.2
Labour	Margaret Reid	16,923	32.6	+3.8
Majority		18,023	34.8	+5.4
Turnout		51,869	78.0	−4.9
Conservative hold		Swing		
