= 1971 Arundel and Shoreham by-election =

UK parliamentary by-election

← 1970	1 April 1971

Constituency of Arundel and Shoreham
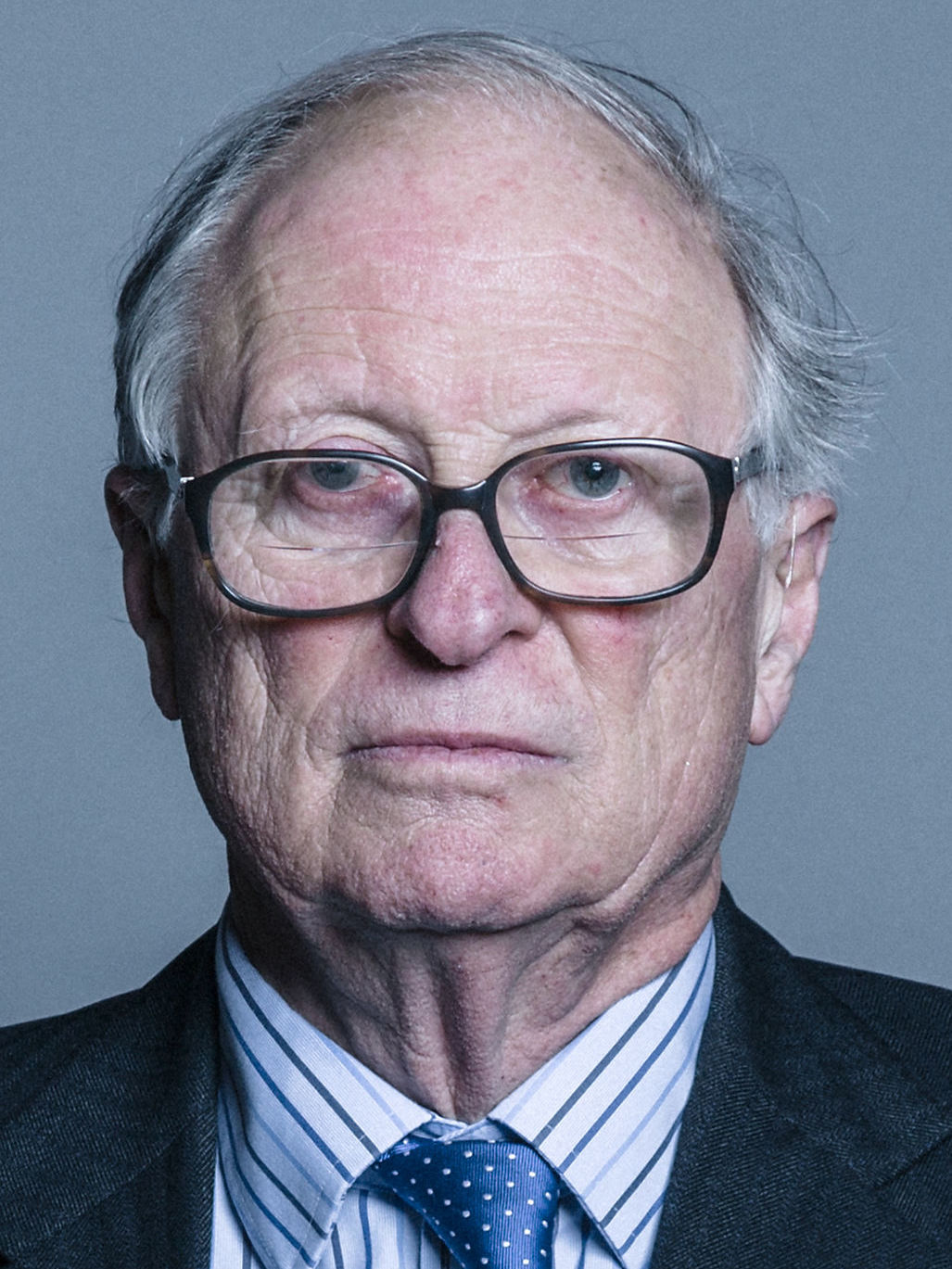
	First party	Second party	Third party
		Lab	Lib
Candidate	Richard Luce	Roger R. Kenward	Peter Bartram
Party	Conservative	Labour	Liberal
Popular vote	34,482	11,228	7,917
Percentage	64.1%	20.9%	14.7%
Swing	▲3.3%	▼2.0%	▼1.6%
MP before election
Henry Kerby
Conservative
Subsequent MP
Richard Luce
Conservative

A 1971 by-election for the United Kingdom House of Commons was held in the constituency of Arundel and Shoreham on 1 April 1971, following the death of sitting Conservative Member of Parliament (MP) Henry Kerby.

It was successfully held by the new Conservative candidate, Richard Napier Luce.

== Result ==
Arundel and Shoreham by-election, 1971
Party	Candidate	Votes	%	±%
Conservative	Richard Luce	34,482	64.1	+3.3
Labour	Roger R Kenward	11,228	20.9	−2.0
Liberal	Peter Bartram	7,917	14.7	−1.6
Independent	George Thomas	191	0.4	New
Majority		23,254	43.2	+5.3
Turnout		53,818		
Conservative hold		Swing		

== Previous result ==
General election 1970: Arundel and Shoreham
Party	Candidate	Votes	%	±%
Conservative	Henry Kerby	43,907	60.8	+5.3
Labour	Barry M Lyne	16,531	22.9	−6.0
Liberal	Peter Bartram	11,769	16.3	0.0
Majority		27,376	37.9	+11.3
Turnout		72,207	71.8	−4.0
Conservative hold		Swing		

== See also ==
- Arundel and Shoreham constituency
- Lists of United Kingdom by-elections
- List of United Kingdom by-elections (1950-1979)
