= High Steward of Westminster Abbey =

The High Steward of Westminster Abbey is an honorary role at Westminster Abbey, London. He is appointed by the Dean and Chapter, and holds the office for life. Past holders have included Robert Cecil (in the 16th century) and Douglas Hurd (in the early 21st century).

Since October 2016, the role has been held by the Duke of Buccleuch and Queensberry.

The official costume is an orange cape and white ruff.

The deputy High Steward is an ex officio role of the Lord Mayor of Westminster.

== List of holders ==
- Walter Montagu Douglas Scott, 5th Duke of Buccleuch 1842–1884
- Hugh Grosvenor, 1st Duke of Westminster ? – 22 December 1899
- Robert Gascoyne-Cecil, 3rd Marquess of Salisbury January 1900 – 22 August 1903 (High Steward of the City and Liberty of Westminster)
- James Gascoyne-Cecil, 4th Marquess of Salisbury, 10 November 1903 – 4 April 1947
- Edward Frederick Lindley Wood, 1st Earl of Halifax, 27 June 1947 – 23 December 1959
- Harry Crookshank, 1st Viscount Crookshank, 22 March 1960 – 17 October 1961
- Ralph Assheton, 1st Baron Clitheroe, 22 February 1962 – 18 September 1984
- Gordon Richardson, Baron Richardson of Duntisbourne, 10 January 1985 – December 1988
- Robert Blake, Baron Blake, 6 January 1989 – September 1999
- Douglas Hurd, Baron Hurd of Westwell, September 1999 – February 2011
- Richard Luce, Baron Luce, February 2011 – October 2016
- Richard Scott, 10th Duke of Buccleuch, October 2016 – present

== Sources ==
- Wrightson, "The Social World of Early Modern Westminster: Abbey, Court and Community, 1525–1640" (English Historical Review 2007; CXXII: 180–182)
