= Richard Luce, Baron Luce =

British politician

The Right Honourable The Lord Luce KG GCVO PC DL
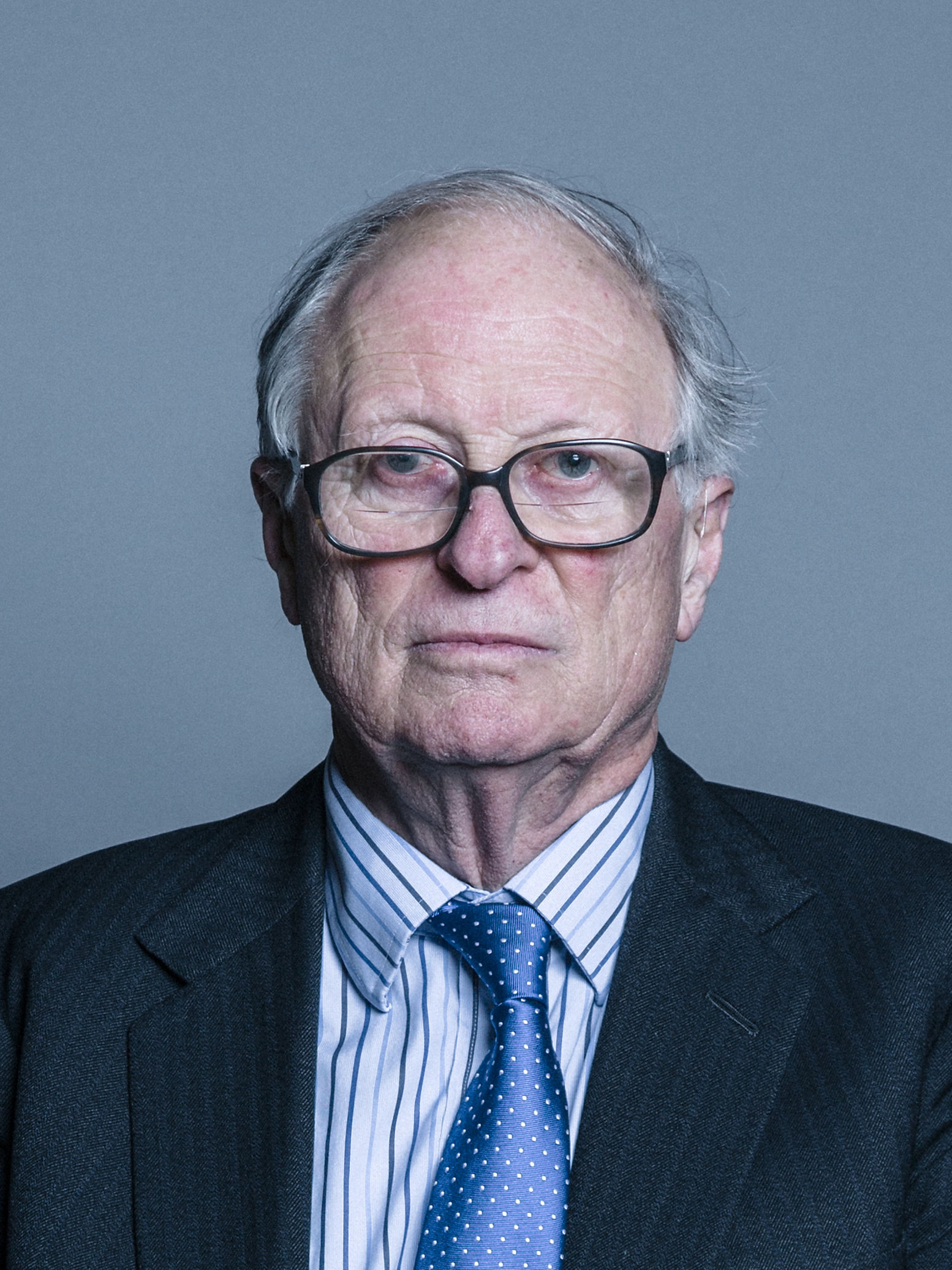

Lord Chamberlain
- In office 1 October 2000 – 15 October 2006
- Monarch: Elizabeth II
- Preceded by: The Lord Camoys
- Succeeded by: The Earl Peel

Governor of Gibraltar
- In office 24 February 1997 – 21 March 2000
- Monarch: Elizabeth II
- Chief Minister: Peter Caruana
- Preceded by: Sir Hugo White
- Succeeded by: Sir David Durie

Minister of State for the Arts
- In office 3 September 1985 – 25 July 1990
- Prime Minister: Margaret Thatcher
- Preceded by: The Earl of Gowrie
- Succeeded by: David Mellor

Member of the House of Lords
- Lord Temporal
- Life peerage 2 October 2000 – 29 June 2020

Member of Parliament for Shoreham Arundel and Shoreham (1971–1974)
- In office 1 April 1971 – 16 March 1992
- Preceded by: Henry Kerby
- Succeeded by: Michael Stephen

Personal details
- Born: Richard Napier Luce; 14 October 1936 (age 90) Westminster, England
- Party: None (Crossbencher)
- Other political affiliations: Conservative (as an MP)
- Children: The Hon. Alexander Luce; The Hon. Edward Luce
- Parent(s): William Luce; Margaret Napier
- Education: Christ's College, Cambridge

Viceregal styles of The Lord Luce (1997–2000)
- Reference style: His Excellency
- Spoken style: Your Excellency

Richard Napier Luce, Baron Luce (born 14 October 1936) is a British politician. He is a former Lord Chamberlain to Queen Elizabeth II, serving from 2000 to 2006, and was Governor of Gibraltar from 1997 to 2000, a Conservative Member of Parliament (MP) from 1971 to 1992, and government minister, and is currently a crossbench member of the House of Lords. He is the maternal uncle of comedian and writer Miranda Hart.

== Early career ==
Born in Westminster, Luce was educated at Wellington College and Christ's College, Cambridge. He completed national service in Cyprus 1955–1957, serving as a second lieutenant with the Wiltshire Regiment. His service number was 449150. He then briefly joined the Overseas Civil Service, first as a district officer in Kenya, 1960–1962. He then worked for Gallaher Ltd as a brand manager (1963–1965), before becoming marketing manager for the Spirella Company of Great Britain. In 1968–1971 he was director of the National Innovation Centre.

From 1972 to 1979, Luce was chairman of IFA Consultants Ltd; he was also chair of Selenex Ltd (1973–1979), and of Courtenay Stewart International (1975–1979).

== Political career ==
After unsuccessfully contesting Hitchin against Labour's Shirley Williams in 1970, Luce was first elected to the House of Commons as Member of Parliament (MP) for Arundel and Shoreham in a by-election in 1971. When that constituency was abolished in boundary changes for the February 1974 general election, he was returned for the new Shoreham constituency. He retired from the Commons at the 1992 general election.

Luce was appointed the parliamentary private secretary to the Minister of Trade and Consumer Affairs in 1972. After the Conservative Party lost the February 1974 general election, he became an opposition whip.

When the Conservatives returned to power at the 1979 general election, he became Parliamentary Under-Secretary of State for Foreign Affairs for the Foreign and Commonwealth Office. In 1981, he was promoted to Minister of State for Foreign Affairs within the same department. In 1982, he followed his Secretary of State, Lord Carrington, in resigning over Argentina's invasion of the Falkland Islands. He returned to office in 1983, again as a minister of state in the Foreign and Commonwealth Office. In 1985, he was moved to the Privy Council Office as Minister for the Arts and Minister for the Civil Service, which was his last ministerial office. He resigned in 1990.

Luce was made a privy counsellor in 1986 and knighted in 1991.

== Later life ==
Luce was Vice-Chancellor of the University of Buckingham between 1992 and 1996. In 1997, he was appointed Governor of Gibraltar, an office he held until 2000, and he was created a life peer, on 2 October 2000 as Baron Luce, of Adur in the County of West Sussex. He sat in the House of Lords until his retirement on 29 June 2020.

In 2000, Luce was appointed a Knight Grand Cross of the Royal Victorian Order (GCVO) and became Lord Chamberlain, head of the Queen's Royal Household. He relinquished the post of Lord Chamberlain on 11 October 2006 and was succeeded by The Earl Peel.

Luce was appointed a Knight Companion of the Order of the Garter (KG) on 23 April 2008.

On 26 April 2012, Luce was appointed by David Cameron, the Prime Minister, as the chair of the Crown Nominations Commission for the see of Canterbury, the commission set up to nominate the 105th Archbishop of Canterbury.

Luce is president of the Voluntary Arts Network, and was High Steward of Westminster Abbey from 2011 to 2016. He was president of the Royal Over-Seas League from 2002 until May 2020.

Luce was appointed as the first Chancellor of the University of Gibraltar upon its foundation in 2015.

== In popular culture ==
Lord Luce is portrayed by Jonathan Coy in the 2002 BBC production of Ian Curteis's controversial The Falklands Play. He has written Ringing the Changes, A Memoir, published by Michael Russell.

== Family ==
He is the son of Margaret (née Napier) and Sir William Luce, Governor and Commander-in-Chief of Aden, Political Resident in the Gulf and Special Representative to the Foreign Secretary (Lord Home) for Gulf Affairs. His father's older brother was Admiral Sir David Luce, First Sea Lord (1963–1966). His maternal grandfather was Vice Admiral Sir Trevylyan Napier, who was the Commander-in-Chief, America and West Indies Station (1919–1920).

Luce has two sons, Alexander and Edward. His sister Diana is married to retired Royal Navy officer Captain David Hart Dyke, and his niece is comedian and actress Miranda Hart. His paternal grandfather, Rear Admiral John Luce, survived two key British naval battles during World War I: the defeat at the Battle of Coronel and the victory at the Battle of the Falkland Islands.

== Arms ==
Coat of arms of Richard Luce, Baron Luce
Notes Knight since 1991 Coronet A coronet of a baron Crest Upon a helm with a wreath of Or and Gules, within a circlet of Plumbago Flowers a Mute Swan naiant proper, gorged with a Chain pendant thereform a Portcullis Or. Torse Mantling Or and Gules. Escutcheon Gules, two lucies naiant in pale Or, and on a chief Or, a key fesswise the wards to the dexter Gules, between two martlets Sable. Motto FIAT LUX; Latin: Come light Other elements Order of the Garter circlet bearing the inscription HONI SOIT QUI MAL Y PENSE Banner The banner of the Baron Luce's arms used as Knight Companion of the Garter depicted at St George's Chapel.

== Honours ==
=== Commonwealth honours ===
Commonwealth honours

Country	Date	Appointment	Post-nominal letters
United Kingdom	1986–present	Member of Her Majesty's Most Honourable Privy Council	PC
United Kingdom	1991–present	Knight Bachelor	(Knight Bachelor does not have post-nominals)
England	1991–2011	Deputy Lieutenant of West Sussex	DL
United Kingdom	2000–present	Knight Grand Cross of the Royal Victorian Order	GCVO
England	23 April 2008 – present	Knight Companion of the Order of the Garter	KG

=== Scholastic ===
Chancellor, visitor, governor, rector and fellowships

Location	Date	School	Position
England	1992–1996	University of Buckingham	Vice Chancellor
England	2005–present	Christ's College, Cambridge	Honorary Fellow
Gibraltar	2015–2019	University of Gibraltar	Chancellor

=== Honorary degrees ===
Location	Date	School	Degree	Gave commencement address
England	1998	University of Buckingham	Doctor of the University (D.Univ)	

=== Memberships and fellowships ===
Country	Date	Organisation	Position
United Kingdom	1991–present	Imperial Society of Knights Bachelor	Member
United Kingdom	1992 – May 2020	Royal Over-Seas League	President
England	February 2011 – October 2016	Westminster Abbey	High Steward

Parliament of the United Kingdom
Preceded by Henry Kerby	Member of Parliament for Arundel and Shoreham; 1971 – February 1974	Constituency abolished
New constituency	Member of Parliament for Shoreham; February 1974 – 1992	Succeeded by Michael Stephen
Political offices
Preceded by Grey Gowrie	Minister for the Arts; 1985–1990	Succeeded by David Mellor
Government offices
Preceded by Sir Hugo White	Governor of Gibraltar; 1997–2000	Succeeded by Sir David Durie
Court offices
Preceded by The Rt Hon. The Lord Camoys	Lord Chamberlain; 2000–2006	Succeeded by The Rt Hon. The Earl Peel
Orders of precedence in the United Kingdom
Preceded by The Lord Morgan	Gentlemen; Baron Luce	Followed by The Lord Ashcroft
