= Shoreham (constituency) =

UK Parliament constituency (1974–1997)

- Former county constituency for the House of Commons
- County: West Sussex

February 1974–1997
- Seats: One
- Created from: Arundel and Shoreham
- Replaced by: East Worthing and Shoreham, Worthing West, Arundel and South Downs

Shoreham was a parliamentary constituency centred on the town of Shoreham-by-Sea in West Sussex. It returned one Member of Parliament (MP) to the House of Commons of the Parliament of the United Kingdom from 1974 to 1997.

Before the 1885 general election, the Parliamentary borough of New Shoreham, also known simply as Shoreham, returned two members to the House of Commons.

== History ==
This was a safe Conservative seat throughout its existence.

== Boundaries ==
1974-1983: The Urban Districts of Shoreham and Southwick, the Rural District of Chanctonbury, and in the Rural District of Worthing the parishes of Coombes, Findon, Houghton, Lancing, and Sompting.

1983-1997: The District of Adur, and the District of Arun wards of Angmering, East Preston and Kingston, Ferring, Findon, Rustington East, and Rustington West.

The constituency was created for the February 1974 general election, when the Arundel and Shoreham constituency was divided. It was abolished for the 1997 general election, when it was largely replaced by the new East Worthing and Shoreham constituency.

== Members of Parliament ==
Election	Member	Party
Feb 1974	Richard Luce	Conservative
1992	Michael Stephen	Conservative
1997	constituency abolished: see East Worthing and Shoreham, Worthing West, Arundel and South Downs	

== Elections ==
=== Elections in the 1990s ===
General election 1992: Shoreham
Party	Candidate	Votes	%	±%
Conservative	Michael Stephen	32,670	56.5	−4.4
Liberal Democrats	Martin King	18,384	31.8	+1.8
Labour	P Godwin	6,123	10.6	+1.5
Liberal	W Weights	459	0.8	New
Natural Law	JI Dreben	200	0.3	New
Majority		14,286	24.7	−6.2
Turnout		57,836	81.2	+3.5
Conservative hold		Swing	−3.1	

=== Elections in the 1980s ===
General election 1987: Shoreham
Party	Candidate	Votes	%	±%
Conservative	Richard Luce	33,660	60.9	−0.8
Alliance	Julian Ingram	16,590	30.0	−1.0
Labour	Paul Godwin	5,053	9.1	+1.7
Majority		17,070	30.9	+0.2
Turnout		55,303	77.5	+3.8
Conservative hold		Swing		

General election 1983: Shoreham
Party	Candidate	Votes	%	±%
Conservative	Richard Luce	31,679	61.7	+0.8
Alliance	Julian Ingram	15,913	31.0	+8.4
Labour	Sylvia Hurcombe	3,794	7.4	−8.3
Majority		15,766	30.7	−7.6
Turnout		51,386	73.7	−4.3
Conservative hold		Swing		

=== Elections in the 1970s ===
General election 1979: Shoreham
Party	Candidate	Votes	%	±%
Conservative	Richard Luce	34,339	60.9	+9.7
Liberal	C Robinson	12,754	22.6	−6.3
Labour	GD Shamash	8,867	15.7	−4.2
National Front	J Benjafield	406	0.7	New
Majority		21,585	38.3	+16.0
Turnout		56,366	78.0	+3.3
Conservative hold		Swing		

General election October 1974: Shoreham
Party	Candidate	Votes	%	±%
Conservative	Richard Luce	26,170	51.2	−0.1
Liberal	Peter F Bartram	14,797	28.9	−4.6
Labour	Q Barry	10,200	19.9	+4.7
Majority		11,373	22.3	+4.5
Turnout		51,167	74.7	−5.4
Conservative hold		Swing		

General election February 1974: Shoreham
Party	Candidate	Votes	%	±%
Conservative	Richard Luce	28,200	51.3	
Liberal	Peter F Bartram	18,442	33.5	
Labour	Q Barry	8,360	15.2	
Majority		9,758	17.8	
Turnout		55,002	80.1	
Conservative win (new seat)				

== See also ==
- parliamentary constituencies in West Sussex

== Sources ==
- Boundaries of Parliamentary Constituencies 1885-1972, compiled and edited by F.W.S. Craig (Parliamentary Reference Publications 1972)
- The Parliaments of England by Henry Stooks Smith (1st edition published in three volumes 1844–50), second edition edited (in one volume) by F.W.S. Craig (Political Reference Publications 1973) out of copyright
- Victoria History of the County of Sussex - south part of the Rape of Bramber
