= Macmillan ministry =

Macmillan ministry may refer to:

- First Macmillan ministry, the British majority government led by Harold Macmillan from 1957 to 1959
- Second Macmillan ministry, the British majority government led by Harold Macmillan from 1959 to 1963
