= Fête de la Musique =

Annual music celebration

Fête de la musique being celebrated in Brest, France, in 2015

The Fête de la Musique (French pronunciation: [fɛt d(ə) la myzik]), also known in English as Music Day, Make Music Day, or World Music Day, is an annual music celebration which usually takes place in mid-June. On Music Day, citizens and residents are urged to play music outside, in their neighborhoods or in public spaces and parks. Free concerts are also organized, where musicians play for fun.

The idea for the first all-day musical celebration on the day of the summer solstice came from Jack Lang, then Minister of Culture of France, and Maurice Fleuret; it was celebrated in Paris in 1982 and has since been celebrated every 21 June across France. Music Day later became celebrated in 120 countries around the world.

== History ==
In October 1981, Maurice Fleuret became Director of Music and Dance at the French Ministry of Culture at Jack Lang's request. He applied his reflections to the musical practice and its evolution: "the music everywhere and the concert nowhere". When he discovered, in a 1982 study on the cultural habits of the French, that five million people, one young person out of two, played a musical instrument, he began to dream of a way to bring people out on the streets. It first took place in 1982 in Paris as the Fête de la Musique.

What started as a small neighbourhood party in the streets of French cities has now become a national holiday for the country with almost 64% of population celebrating in 2026. It evolved from neighbours playing instruments together to people of all ages, all across the country attending musical events of all styles and sizes.

Ever since, the festival has become an international phenomenon, celebrated on the same day in more than 700 cities in 120 countries, including India, Germany, Italy, Greece, Russia, Australia, Peru, Brazil, Ecuador, Mexico, Canada, the United States, the UK, and Japan.

In the Anglosphere, the day has become known as Music Day, Make Music Day and World Music Day.

== Purpose ==
The main purpose of Fête de la Musique is to promote music. Amateur and professional musicians are encouraged to perform in the streets, under the slogan "Faites de la musique" ("Make music"), a homophone of Fête de la musique. Thousands of free concerts are staged throughout the day, making all genres of music accessible to the public.

Out in the streets, there are stages, speakers and bands performing, at no cost for, anyone who wants to celebrate the day and listen to music. But there are also formal orchestras, concerts and choir events to attend.

Fête de la musique being celebrated in a neighbourhood of Strasbourg, France

The choice of 21 June is not random. This is the summer solstice, the longest day of the year in the northern hemisphere. It represents the return of warmth and summer which encourages people to get outside, meet their neighbours, listen to music and dance all day and night.

== France ==
Despite the general public exhibiting great tolerance for musical performances in public areas in evening hours, noise restrictions do apply and entertainment establishments may only extend their working hours on the day and broadcast music in the evening hours with prior authorization. Prefectures in France reserve the right to prohibit individuals, groups or establishments from installing audio equipment in the streets.

Fête de la musique being celebrated at the Palais Royal in Paris in 2015.

The celebration originally consisted of a way to showcase musical talent across the party with small concerts in French towns and villages. Today, youths gather in the streets of cities across the country for an open-air celebration with music and dancing. In Paris, the popular places to gather are the Jardin des tuilieries, the Jardin du Luxembourg, and along the banks of the Seine.

The website of the famous Moulin Rouge recommend the following itinerary: during the day catching the outdoor on-stage performances in the parks Le Parc de la Villette and the Jardin du Luxembourg, then walk the streets of Montmartre to watch emerging artists play on the squares, later in the evening head to Le Marais and the Seine banks for a lively and festive atmosphere.

In the last few years, the celebration in Paris has gained a lot of visibility through social media and many British teenagers and young adults have started travelling to Paris for the occasion. It has been perceived as the French version of the infamous Notting Hill Carnival in London.

In 2026, the streets of Paris consisted of 2 million people; warranting the government to warn celebrators about the heat wave warnings and the threat of syringes . The temperature in the French capital reached highs of 38°C and people were advised against drinking alcohol to limit the risk of fainting.

The city of Paris tailors to the people enjoying the celebration by allowing them to stay out late to enjoy the celebration by keeping public transport running throught the night.

== Reach and impact ==
As of 2019, a total of 120 countries and over 1,000 cities participate in Fête de la Musique. In 2023, events were held on most continents.

Italy's Festa della Musica began in 1985, and became national in 1994.

The UK Event began as National Music Day in 1992. Make Music Day UK became an independent organization in 2022.

Ukraine has been holding its event in Lviv since 2013. Despite the Russian invasion of Ukraine, the event continues to be held each year.

In the United States, the Make Music Alliance was formed in 2014 to help coordinate efforts across the country. In 2023, a total of 4,791 free concerts were held across 117 cities. Cincinnati, Madison, New York City, Philadelphia, and Salem each organized over a hundred different concerts on the day.

In Georgetown, DC, the event has been celebrated for the past 3 years at the French embassy and the French Institute for Culture and Education.

In India, classical, contemporary and folk music performances are held throughout the country. Musical duo Sourendro-Soumyojit are known for their annual World Music Day concert in Kolkata, which brings together Indian playback singers at a ticketed event. Brands and advertisers have also adopted the event; on 21 June 2026, The Hindu published a digital music crossword shaped like a beam note to mark the occasion.

In Australia, Make Music Day Australia was initiated in 2018 by the Australian Music Association (AMA), and as of 2022, was co-hosted by the AMA and National Association of Music Merchants (NAMM). In 2023, a huge international project called "Make Music, Make Friends" partnered 10 Australian schools with schools around the world to share music and greet one another on Make Music Day.

In Cyprus, the festival has been held every year since 2019. While Make Music Cyprus is usually limited to Nicosia, the 2025 edition expanded to Larnaca as well, but it was held at an earlier date.

In Belgium, the event has been celebrated for the past 40 years in parks, kiosks, venues and streets.

Turkey and Ghana held their first Make Music Days in 2022, and South Africa in 2023.

In Germany, Fête de la Musique has been celebrated since 1995 and will be celebrated for a 33rd time in 2027 in Berlin. A special permit in the city allows street music and acoustic performances to be played in public streets, squares and parks. 300 stages are estimated to be spread across the city.

In Mexico City, the celebration has been celebrated annually with free performances and organized by the French Alliance of Mexico City since 2007. In 2026, the festival offered 18 musical performances in 6 venues across the city over five days.

== See also ==
- Make Music Day UK
- World music
