= Alex Renton =

British-Canadian journalist

The Honourable Alex Renton FRHistS
- Born: Alexander James Torre Renton; Toronto, Canada
- Education: Ashdown House; Eton College; Brighton College
- Alma mater: University of Exeter
- Occupations: Writer and broadcaster
- Known for: Investigative journalism, history
- Notable work: Blood Legacy: Reckoning With a Family's Story of Slavery (2021)
- Spouse: Ruth Valerie Burnett
- Parents: Tim Renton, Baron Renton of Mount Harry (father); Alice Fergusson (mother)
- Website: alexrenton.com

Alexander James Torre Renton FRHistS is a British journalist and broadcaster. He is the author of several historical and investigative books, including Stiff Upper Lip: Secrets, Crimes and the Schooling of a Ruling Class (2017) and Blood Legacy: Reckoning With a Family's Story of Slavery (2021). In 2023 he co-founded the advocacy and education group Heirs of Slavery.

== Early life and education ==
Alexander James Torre Renton was born in Toronto, Canada, the oldest child of the politician Tim Renton, Baron Renton of Mount Harry and the novelist and historian Alice Blanche Helen Fergusson.

He was educated at Ashdown House, East Sussex; Eton College; Brighton College; and the University of Exeter, where he studied English. Since 2024, Renton has been a Visiting Fellow at Newcastle University.

== Career ==
As a journalist Renton has held staff jobs as a reporter and editor on British newspapers The Independent and the London Evening Standard. He has been a columnist for The Times and a Scotland-based correspondent for Newsweek magazine. He has won awards for foreign reporting, investigative journalism and food writing. He worked in Asia for Oxfam from 2001 to 2004. There he began writing about food cultures, poverty and food policy.

Drawing on his own experience at three British boarding schools, Renton was presenter and reporter on a 2018 episode of the ITV current affairs programme Exposure titled "Boarding Schools, the Secret Shame". In 2022, he co-wrote and presented a BBC Radio 4 series, In Dark Corners, about abuse and cover-up at some of Britain's elite schools, including Eton College, Fettes College, Gordonstoun and its junior school. A second series looking at the Paedophile Information Exchange and systemic problems behind child sexual abuse in institutions was broadcast in January 2025.

According to The Guardian in July 2022, since realising in 2013 that the teachers who abused him could still be abusing children, Renton started to speak out about the abuse he suffered, and to support other victims with a book, articles, and radio and television programmes. He has said that many prestigious schools go to great lengths to protect their reputation rather than victims. Renton has said that boarding schools are "simply unsafe" until the law on safeguarding in residential institutions for the vulnerable is overhauled, and that his is the first in about seven generations of his family not to send their children to boarding school.

== Awards ==
Renton's book Blood Legacy, an account of his ancestors' involvement in the Atlantic slave trade and plantation slavery in the Caribbean, was long-listed for the Baillie Gifford Prize for non-fiction in 2021. It was also short-listed for the History Prize in the Saltire Society's literary awards, known as Scotland's National Book Awards, and British Academy Book Prize in 2022.

The BBC Radio 4 series In Dark Corners produced by BBC Scotland and presented and co-written by Renton, won the British Broadcasting Press Guild's Radio Programme of the Year award in 2023. In Dark Corners won best series and a further award at the 2023 Arias, the Radio Academy awards.

== Other activities ==
In April 2023 he co-founded, with former BBC journalist Laura Trevelyan and others, Heirs of Slavery, a group of descendants of people who had profited from British transatlantic slavery and wanted to make amends in the form of reparations. Other members include Charles Gladstone, who is descended from prime minister William Gladstone, and David Lascelles, 8th Earl of Harewood. The group has called on the British Prime Minister and King Charles to make a formal apology on behalf of the United Kingdom.

== Selected publications ==
Renton is the author of several historical and investigative books, including:

- Planet Carnivore: Why Cheap Meat Costs the Earth (2014), ISBN 9781536643381
- Stiff Upper Lip: Secrets, Crimes and the Schooling of a Ruling Class (2017), ISBN 9781474600545
- Blood Legacy: Reckoning With a Family's Story of Slavery (2021), ISBN 9781786898869
- 13 Foods that Shape Our World (2022), ISBN 9781785947384

== Personal life ==
Renton married the journalist Ruth Valerie Burnett in 2002.
