= Jack Donaldson, Baron Donaldson of Kingsbridge =

British politician and public servant

The Right Honourable The Lord Donaldson of Kingsbridge OBE

Minister of State for the Arts
- In office 5 April 1976 – 4 May 1979
- Prime Minister: James Callaghan
- Preceded by: Hugh Jenkins
- Succeeded by: Norman St John-Stevas

Parliamentary Under-Secretary of State for Northern Ireland
- In office 4 March 1974 – 5 April 1976
- Prime Minister: Harold Wilson
- Preceded by: The Lord Belstead
- Succeeded by: James Dunn

Member of the House of Lords Lord Temporal
- In office 20 November 1967 – 8 March 1998; Life Peerage

Personal details
- Born: 9 October 1907
- Died: 8 March 1998 (aged 90)
- Party: Labour (until 1981); SDP (1981-1988); Liberal Democrats (1988-1998)
- Spouse: Frances Lonsdale
- Education: Eton College; Trinity College, Cambridge

John George Stuart Donaldson, Baron Donaldson of Kingsbridge, OBE (9 October 1907 – 8 March 1998) was a British politician and public servant. He was a soldier, farmer, prison reformer, approved school manager, and consumers' champion.

== Life ==
Jack Donaldson was the son of the Rev. S. A. Donaldson, sometime Master of Magdalene College, Cambridge, and Lady Albinia Donaldson (née Hobart-Hampden), the sister of the 7th Earl of Buckinghamshire. He was educated at Eton College (where he founded a jazz band called The Eton Outcasts) and at Trinity College, Cambridge, and married Frances Lonsdale in 1935. In 1939 he was commissioned into the Royal Engineers and served throughout the Second World War, reaching the rank of lieutenant-colonel and being appointed Officer of the Order of the British Empire (OBE) in 1943.

He was created a life peer as Baron Donaldson of Kingsbridge, of Kingsbridge in the County of Buckingham on 20 November 1967. He was Parliamentary Under-Secretary of State at the Northern Ireland Office from 1974 to 1976, and served as Minister for the Arts from 1976 until the end of James Callaghan's government three years later. He left the Labour Party for the Social Democratic Party (SDP) in 1981, and remained with the Liberal Democrats after the SDP merger with the Liberals.

From 1968 to 1971 he was Chairman of the National Consumer Council.

His grandson is Fred Deakin of Lemon Jelly.

== Works ==
- Farming in Britain Today (1969) with Frances Donaldson and Derek Barber
- Jack Donaldson: A Soldier's Letters (2017) A posthumous edition of letters written in the Second World War, 1939–45

== Portraits of Jack Donaldson ==
The United Kingdom's National Portrait Gallery holds the following portrait featuring Lord Donaldson of Kingsbridge as a sitter: Exhibit number P528: John George Stuart Donaldson, Baron Donaldson of Kingsbridge and Frances Annesley (née Lonsdale), Lady Donaldson of Kingsbridge by Derry Moore, 12th Earl of Drogheda. Painted in 1992; medium: colour print; measurements: 14 7/8 in. x 12 in. (379 mm x 305 mm). See http://www.npg.org.uk/live/search/portrait.asp?search=ap&npgno=P528 for more information.

== Arms ==
Coat of arms of Jack Donaldson, Baron Donaldson of Kingsbridge

Coronet
A Coronet of a Baron
Crest
A Dexter Hand holding a Sword proper
Escutcheon
Or a Double Headed Eagle displayed Azure beaked and membered Gules surmounted of a Lymphad with two masts Sails furled Sable flagged on the fore mast with a Banner of Scotland proper (Azure a Saltire Argent) and on the main mast with a Pennon in the dexter chief point a Hand couped of the third and on the sinister chief point a Book expanded proper all within a Bordure also of the third
Motto
Aut pax aut bellum (Either peace or war)

Political offices
Preceded by Hugh Jenkins	Minister for the Arts; 1976–1979	Succeeded by Norman St John-Stevas
