= Parliamentary Under-Secretary of State for Arts and Museums =

UK government ministerial post in the Department for Culture, Media and Sport

United Kingdom Parliamentary Under-Secretary of State for Arts and Museums
- Royal Arms as used by His Majesty's Government

- Flag of the United Kingdom

- Incumbent; Ruth Mackenzie, Baroness Mackenzie of Sherwood since 22 July 2026
- Department for Digital, Culture, Media and Sport
- Style: Arts Minister
- Reports to: Secretary of State for Digital, Culture, Media and Sport
- Seat: Westminster
- Appointer: the Sovereign, on the advice of the Prime Minister
- Term length: No fixed term
- Inaugural holder: Jennie Lee
- Formation: 1964
- Website: Official website

In the Government of the United Kingdom, the Parliamentary Under-Secretary of State for Arts and Museums is a ministerial post in the Department for Culture, Media and Sport.

The post is usually a junior to middle-ranking minister to the more senior Secretary of State, who runs the entire department and is ultimately responsible for the department's brief.

The post has been in a variety of ministries, but after 1997 it has been a Minister of State position in the Department for Culture, Media and Sport. From 1992 to 1997, the post was combined with the office of Secretary of State for National Heritage. The title of the post was changed to Minister for Culture in 2005, and to Minister for Culture, Creative Industries and Tourism in 2007. Under that last title, the office was held by Barbara Follett MP, who was appointed on 5 October 2008, until 22 September 2009.

Ed Vaizey was appointed by then Prime Minister David Cameron to the position as Minister for Culture, Communications and Creative Industries at Parliamentary Under-Secretary of State level, a post Vaizey initially split between the Department for Culture, Media and Sport (DCMS) and the Department for Business, Innovation and Skills (BIS), but is now entirely placed in the DCMS.

== Current portfolio ==
- Arts - ACE review, sponsorship and policy
- Museums and cultural property
- Libraries
- The National Archives

== Ministers for the Arts ==
The individuals who have held the office of Minister for the Arts or equivalent existing positions, their terms and under which Prime Minister.

Office holder	Term of office		Title	Political Party	Ministry
Jennie Lee	1964	1967	Minister of State for the Arts	Labour	Harold Wilson
Jennie Lee	1967	1970	Parliamentary Under-Secretary for the Arts	Labour	Harold Wilson
The Viscount Eccles	20 June 1970	5 June 1973	Minister of State for the Arts	Conservative	Edward Heath
Norman St John-Stevas	2 December 1973	4 March 1974	Minister of State for the Arts	Conservative	Edward Heath
Hugh Jenkins	4 March 1974	5 April 1976	Minister of State for the Arts	Labour	Harold Wilson
The Lord Donaldson of Kingsbridge	5 April 1976	4 May 1979	Minister of State for the Arts	Labour	James Callaghan
Norman St John-Stevas	5 May 1979	5 January 1981	Minister of State for the Arts	Conservative	Margaret Thatcher
Paul Channon	5 January 1981	11 June 1983	Minister of State for the Arts	Conservative	Margaret Thatcher
The Earl of Gowrie	11 June 1983	2 September 1985	Minister of State for the Arts	Conservative	Margaret Thatcher
Richard Luce	3 September 1985	25 July 1990	Minister of State for the Arts	Conservative	Margaret Thatcher
David Mellor	26 July 1990	28 November 1990	Minister of State for the Arts	Conservative	Margaret Thatcher
Tim Renton	28 November 1990	11 April 1992	Minister of State for the Arts	Conservative	John Major
David Mellor	11 April 1992	22 September 1992	Secretary of State for National Heritage	Conservative	John Major
Peter Brooke CH	22 September 1992	20 July 1994	Secretary of State for National Heritage	Conservative	John Major
Stephen Dorrell	20 July 1994	5 July 1995	Secretary of State for National Heritage	Conservative	John Major
Virginia Bottomley	5 July 1995	2 May 1997	Secretary of State for National Heritage	Conservative	John Major
Mark Fisher	2 May 1997	14 June 1998	Parliamentary Under-Secretary of State for the Arts	Labour	Tony Blair
Alan Howarth	28 July 1998	7 June 2001	Parliamentary Under-Secretary of State for the Arts	Labour	Tony Blair
The Baroness Blackstone	8 June 2001	13 June 2003	Minister of State for the Arts	Labour	Tony Blair
Estelle Morris	13 June 2003	5 May 2005	Minister of State for the Arts	Labour	Tony Blair
David Lammy	5 May 2005	28 June 2007	Minister of State for Culture	Labour	Tony Blair
Margaret Hodge	28 June 2007	3 October 2008	Minister of State for Culture and Tourism	Labour	Gordon Brown
Barbara Follett	4 October 2008	22 September 2009	Minister of State for Culture and Tourism	Labour	Gordon Brown
Margaret Hodge	22 September 2009	11 May 2010	Minister of State for Culture and Tourism	Labour	Gordon Brown
Ed Vaizey	14 May 2010	15 July 2014	Parliamentary Under-Secretary of State for Culture, Communications and Creative Industries	Conservative	David Cameron
Ed Vaizey	15 July 2014	15 July 2016	Minister of State for Culture and the Digital Economy	Conservative	David Cameron
Matt Hancock	15 July 2016	8 January 2018	Minister of State for Digital and Culture	Conservative	Theresa May
Margot James	9 January 2018	18 July 2019	Minister of State for Digital and Creative Industries	Conservative	Theresa May
Nigel Adams	24 July 2019	13 February 2020	Minister of State for Sport, Media and Creative Industries	Conservative	Boris Johnson
Caroline Dinenage	13 February 2020	15 September 2021	Minister of State for Digital and Culture	Conservative	Boris Johnson
The Lord Parkinson of Whitley Bay	30 September 2021	20 September 2022	Parliamentary Under-Secretary of State for Arts	Conservative	Boris Johnson
The Lord Parkinson of Whitley Bay	27 October 2022	March 2024	Parliamentary Under-Secretary of State for Arts and Heritage	Conservative	Rishi Sunak
The Lord Parkinson of Whitley Bay	27 March 2024	5 July 2024	Parliamentary Under-Secretary of State for Arts, Heritage and Libraries	Conservative	Rishi Sunak
Chris Bryant	8 July 2024	6 September 2025	Minister of State for Creative Industries, Arts and Tourism	Labour	Keir Starmer
Ian Murray	6 September 2025	22 July 2026	Minister of State for Creative Industries, Media and Arts	Labour	Keir Starmer
The Baroness Mackenzie of Sherwood	22 July 2026	Incumbent	Parliamentary Under-Secretary of State for Arts and Museums	Labour	Andy Burnham
