= Parliamentary constituencies in West Sussex =

The county of West Sussex is divided into 9 parliamentary constituencies: 2 borough constituencies and 7 county constituencies, one of which crosses the county border with East Sussex.

== Constituencies ==
Conservative † Labour ‡ Liberal Democrat ¤

Constituency (Note: BC denotes borough constituency, CC denotes county constituency.)	Electorate	Majority (Note: The majority is the number of votes the winning candidate receives more than their nearest rival.)	Member of Parliament	Nearest opposition	Electoral wards	Map
Arundel and South Downs CC	77,969	12,134	Andrew Griffith †	Richard Allen ¤	Arun: Arundel and Walberton, Barnham, Felpham East (polling district BHOE); Chichester: Easebourne, Fernhurst, Fittleworth, Goodwood (polling districts GWBX, GWEA, GWED, GWSI and GWUP), Harting, Loxwood, Midhurst, Petworth; Horsham: Bramber, Upper Beeding and Woodmancote, Henfield, Pulborough, Coldwaltham and Amberley, Steyning and Ashurst, Storrington and Washington, West Chiltington, Thakeham and Ashington	
Bognor Regis and Littlehampton CC	77,565	3,651	Alison Griffiths †	Clare Walsh ‡	Arun: Aldwick East, Aldwick West, Beach, Brookfield, Courtwick with Toddington, Felpham East (polling districts BFELE1, BFELE2, BFELE3 and BFELE4), Felpham West, Hotham, Marine, Middleton-on-Sea, Orchard, Pevensey, River, Rustington East, Rustington West, Yapton	
Chichester CC	78,374	12,178	Jess Brown-Fuller ¤	Gillian Keegan †	Arun: Bersted, Pagham; Chichester: Chichester Central, Chichester East, Chichester North, Chichester South, Chichester West, Goodwood (polling districts GWWD and GWWH), Harbour Villages, Lavant, North Mundham and Tangmere, Selsey South, Sidlesham with Selsey North, Southbourne, The Witterings, Westbourne	
Crawley BC	76,575	5,235	Peter Lamb ‡	Zack Ali †	Crawley: Bewbush and North Broadfield, Broadfield, Gossops Green and North East Broadfield, Ifield, Langley Green and Tushmore, Maidenbower, Northgate and West Green, Pound Hill North and Forge Wood, Pound Hill South and Worth, Southgate, Three Bridges, Tilgate	
East Grinstead and Uckfield CC (part)	75,385	8,480	Mims Davies †	Benedict Dempsey ¤	Lewes: Chailey, Barcombe and Hamsey, Newick, Wivelsfield; Mid Sussex: Ardingly and Balcombe, Ashurst Wood, Copthorne and Worth, Crawley Down and Turners Hill, East Grinstead Ashplats, East Grinstead Baldwins, East Grinstead Herontye, East Grinstead Imberhorne, East Grinstead Town, High Weald; Wealden: Buxted, Danehill and Fletching, Forest Row, Maresfield, Uckfield East, Uckfield New Town, Uckfield North, Uckfield Ridgewood and Little Horsted	
East Worthing and Shoreham CC	74,738	9,519	Tom Rutland ‡	Leila Williams †	Adur: Buckingham, Churchill, Cokeham, Eastbrook, Hillside, Manor, Marine, Mash Barn, Peverel, Southlands, Southwick Green, St Mary's, St Nicolas, Widewater; Worthing: Broadwater, Gaisford, Offington, Selden	
Horsham CC	79,150	2,517	John Milne ¤	Jeremy Quin †	Horsham: Billingshurst, Broadbridge Heath, Colgate and Rusper, Cowfold, Shermanbury and West Grinstead, Denne, Forest, Holbrook East, Holbrook West, Itchingfield, Slinfold and Warnham, Nuthurst and Lower Beeding, Roffey North, Roffey South, Rudgwick, Southwater North, Southwater South and Shipley, Trafalgar	
Mid Sussex CC	75,969	6,662	Alison Bennett ¤	Kristy Adams †	Mid Sussex: Bolney, Burgess Hill Dunstall, Burgess Hill Franklands, Burgess Hill Leylands, Burgess Hill Meeds, Burgess Hill St. Andrews, Burgess Hill Victoria, Cuckfield, Hassocks, Haywards Heath Ashenground, Haywards Heath Bentswood, Haywards Heath Franklands, Haywards Heath Heath, Haywards Heath Lucastes, Hurstpierpoint and Downs, Lindfield	
Worthing West BC	77,038	3,949	Beccy Cooper ‡	Peter Bottomley †	Arun: Angmering and Findon, East Preston, Ferring; Worthing: Castle, Central, Durrington, Goring, Heene, Marine, Northbrook, Salvington, Tarring	

== Historic list of constituencies in West Sussex ==
=== Used from 1950 to 1974 ===
- Arundel and Shoreham
- Chichester
- Horsham
- Worthing

=== Used from 1974 to 1983 ===
- Arundel
- Chichester
- Horsham and Crawley
- Shoreham
- Worthing

=== Used from 1983 to 1997 ===
- Arundel
- Chichester
- Crawley
- Horsham
- Mid Sussex
- Shoreham
- Worthing

The Local Government Act 1972 moved the District of Mid Sussex into West Sussex from East Sussex. This change was put into effect in the Parliamentary constituency boundaries for the 1983 boundary changes.

== Boundary changes ==
=== 2010 ===
Under the fifth periodic review of Westminster constituencies, the Boundary Commission for England decided to retain the existing 8 constituencies in West Sussex, with minor changes to realign constituency boundaries with those of current local government wards, and to reduce the electoral disparity between constituencies.

Name	Boundaries 1997-2010	Boundaries 2010–2024
1. Arundel and South Downs CC; 2. Bognor Regis and Littlehampton CC; 3. Chichester CC; 4. Crawley BC; 5. East Worthing and Shoreham CC; 6. Horsham CC; 7. Mid Sussex CC; 8. Worthing West BC	Boundaries 1997-2010	Boundaries 2010–2024

=== 2024 ===
See 2023 review of Westminster constituencies for further details.

Name	Boundaries 2010–2024	Boundaries 2024–present
1. Arundel and South Downs CC; 2. Bognor Regis and Littlehampton CC; 3. Chichester CC; 4. Crawley BC; 5. East Worthing and Shoreham CC; 6. Horsham CC; 7. Mid Sussex CC; 8. Worthing West BC; 9. East Grinstead and Uckfield CC (2024–present)	Boundaries 2010–2024	

For the 2023 review of Westminster constituencies, which redrew the constituency map ahead of the 2024 United Kingdom general election, the Boundary Commission for England opted to combine West Sussex with East Sussex as a sub-region of the South East Region, resulting in the creation of a new cross-county boundary constituency named East Grinstead and Uckfield.

The following constituencies were proposed:

Containing electoral wards from Adur

- East Worthing and Shoreham (part)

Containing electoral wards from Arun

- Arundel and South Downs (part)
- Bognor Regis and Littlehampton
- Chichester (part)
- Worthing West (part)

Containing electoral wards from Chichester

- Arundel and South Downs (part)
- Chichester (part)

Containing electoral wards from Crawley

- Crawley

Containing electoral wards from Horsham

- Arundel and South Downs (part)
- Horsham

Containing electoral wards from Mid Sussex

- East Grinstead and Uckfield (also contains parts of Lewes and Wealden Districts in East Sussex)
- Mid Sussex

Containing electoral wards from Worthing

- East Worthing and Shoreham (part)
- Worthing West (part)

== Results history ==
Primary data source: House of Commons research briefing - General election results from 1918 to 2019

=== 2024 ===
The number of votes cast for each political party who fielded candidates in constituencies comprising West Sussex in the 2019 general election were as follows:

Party	Votes	%	Change from 2019	Seats	Change from 2019
Conservative	126,025	30.8%	▼25.5%	2	▼6
Labour	102,338	25.0%	▲2.4%	3	▲3
Liberal Democrats	91,349	22.3%	▲5.8%	3	▲3
Reform	60,727	14.8%	New	0	0
Greens	22,841	5.6%	▲1.8%	0	0
Others	5,778	1.4%	▲0.6%	0	0
Total	409,058	100.0		8	

=== Percentage votes ===
Election year	1983	1987	1992	1997	2001	2005	2010	2015	2017	2019	2024
Conservative	59.9	60.0	57.3	44.7	46.0	46.7	51.8	54.2	56.8	56.3	30.8
Labour	9.8	11.8	14.6	24.3	25.9	21.3	13.1	16.1	28.8	22.6	25.0
Liberal Democrat^{1}	29.3	27.6	25.7	25.6	23.0	26.1	27.4	8.4	8.3	16.5	22.3
Reform	-	-	-	-	-	-	-	-	-	-	14.8
Green Party	-	*	*	*	*	*	0.9	4.9	2.6	3.8	5.6
UKIP	-	-	-	*	*	*	5.2	15.6	2.4	*	-
Other	1.0	0.6	2.3	5.5	5.1	6.0	1.6	0.9	0.9	0.9	1.4

^{1}1983 & 1987 - SDP–Liberal Alliance

* Included in Other

=== Seats ===
Election year	1983	1987	1992	1997	2001	2005	2010	2015	2017	2019	2024
Conservative	7	7	7	7	7	7	8	8	8	8	2
Labour	0	0	0	1	1	1	0	0	0	0	3
Liberal Democrats	0	0	0	0	0	0	0	0	0	0	3
Total	7	7	7	8	8	8	8	8	8	8	8

=== Maps ===
==== 1885-1910 ====
1885

1886

1892

1895

1900

1906

Jan 1910

Dec 1910

==== 1918-1945 ====
1918

1922

1923

1924

1929

1931

1935

1945

==== 1950-1979 ====
1950

1951

1955

1959

1964

1966

1970

Feb 1974

Oct 1974

1979

==== 1983-present ====
1983

1987

1992

1997

2001

2005

2010

2015

2017

2019

2024

== Historical representation by party ==
A cell marked → (with a different colour background to the preceding cell) indicates that the previous MP continued to sit under a new party name.

The Local Government Act 1972 moved the District of Mid Sussex into West Sussex from East Sussex. This change was put into effect in the Parliamentary constituency boundaries for the 1983 boundary changes.

From 1885 to 2019, only two MPs had won elections who were not members of the Conservative Party: one Liberal MP in 1923 and one Labour MP in 1997, 2001 and 2005. This changed in 2024, with 3 Labour MPs and 3 Liberal Democrat MPs being elected.

=== 1885 to 1918 ===
Conservative

Constituency	1885	1886	88	1892	93	94	1895	1900	04	1906	Jan 1910	Dec 1910
Chichester	C. Gordon-Lennox		W. Gordon-Lennox			Talbot						
Horsham	Barttelot				Johnstone				Turnour			

=== 1918 to 1950 ===
Conservative Liberal

Constituency	1918	21	1922	1923	1924	1929	1931	1935	42	1945
Chichester	Talbot	Bird		Rudkin	Courtauld				Joynson-Hicks	
Horsham and Worthing / Horsham (1945)	Turnour									
Worthing										Prior-Palmer

=== 1950 to 1983 ===
Conservative

Constituency	1950	1951	54	1955	58	1959	1964	1966	69	1970	71	Feb 1974	Oct 1974	1979
Arundel and Shoreham / Shoreham (1974)	Cuthbert		Kerby								Luce			
Chichester	Joynson-Hicks				Loveys				Chataway				Nelson	
Horsham / Horsham and Crawley (1974)	Turnour	Gough					Hordern							
Worthing	Prior-Palmer						Higgins							
Arundel												Marshall		

=== 1983 to present ===
Conservative Labour

Constituency	1983	1987	1992	1997	2001	2005	2010	2015	2017	2019	2024
Arundel / Arundel and South Downs (1997)	Marshall			Flight		Herbert				Griffith	
Chichester	Nelson			Tyrie					Keegan		Brown-Fuller
Crawley	Soames			Moffatt			Smith				Lamb
Horsham	Hordern			Maude				Quin			Milne
Shoreham / East Worthing and Shoreham (1997)	Luce		Stephen	Loughton							Rutland
Mid Sussex	Renton			Soames						Davies	Bennett
Worthing / Worthing West (1997)	Higgins			Bottomley							Cooper
Bognor Regis and Littlehampton				Gibb							Griffiths

== See also ==
- List of parliamentary constituencies in the South East (region)
