= Lord Soames =

Lord Soames may refer to:

- Christopher Soames (Arthur Christopher John Soames, Baron Soames, 1920–1987), British politician, European commissioner and governor of Southern Rhodesia
- Nicholas Soames (Arthur Nicholas Winston Soames, Baron Soames of Fletching, born 1948), former MP for Mid Sussex and Crawley and son of Christopher Soames
