= The Knowhere Guide =

- Website type: Online guide to British towns
- Available in: English
- Website: www.knowhere.co.uk
- Launched: 1994
- Current status: Online but defunct (March 2022)

The Knowhere Guide was a crowd-sourced online guide to British towns. It originally started life as a guide to the skateboarding scene allowing contributors to add and review skateboarding spots, and was created in 1994 by Tim Leighton-Boyce and Paul Sanders. It has been quoted by British guidebooks such as Rough Guides in the past as a recommended source of online information, and the guide also included a fictional town called "Chuffing Hell" which has been mistaken as a real town previously by commercial directories.

The site's comments about the town of Crawley were seen to be so negative that local MP Laura Moffatt stated, "We should have the ability to take things down."
