= Chinthurst School =

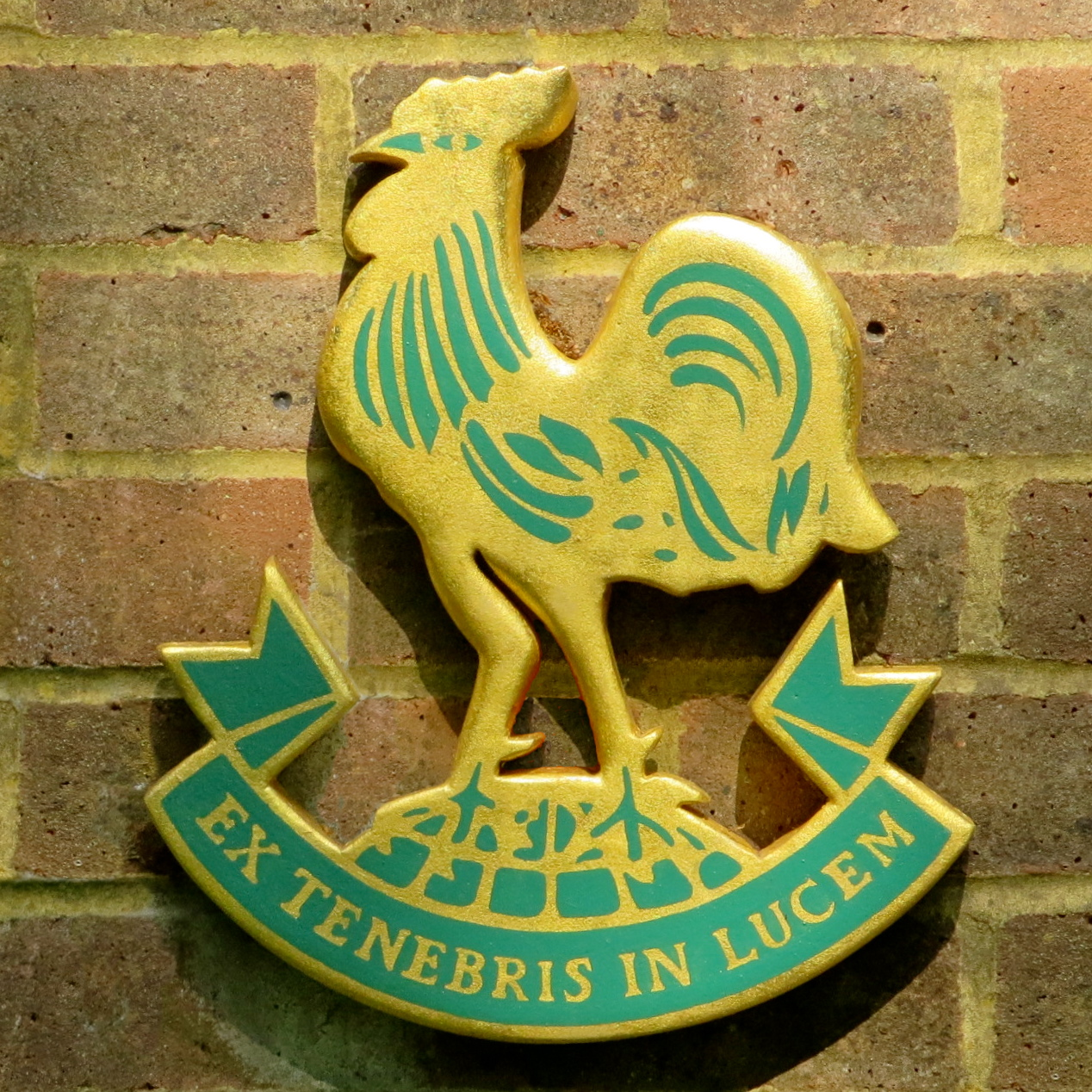

Location
- 52 Tadworth Street; Tadworth, Surrey, KT20 5QZ; England; 51.2882°N 0.2359°W Tadworth (Greater London)

Information
- Type: Private nursery, pre-preparatory and preparatory day school
- Motto: On crest, Latin: Ex tenebris in lucem (from darkness into light). Contemporary: Traditional values, modern teaching.
- Religious affiliation: None
- Established: 1908
- Department for Education URN: 125394 Tables
- Chair of governors: Marc Benton
- Headteacher: Catherine Trundle
- Staff: Approx. 35 full and part time
- Gender: Mixed
- Age: 2 to 11
- Enrolment: Approx. 200
- Capacity: 250
- Houses: Nelson, Raleigh and Wellington
- Publication: The Chronicle (weekly)
- ISC number: 33201
- Website: www.chinthurstschool.co.uk

Chinthurst School is an independent co-educational nursery, pre-preparatory and preparatory school in semi-rural surroundings in the village of Tadworth, Surrey, England, 15 miles south of the centre of London. As a member of the RGS Group, the school is associated with Reigate Grammar School and Reigate St Mary's School. Its pupils' ages range from two to eleven years.

== School characteristics ==
Approximately 200 boys and girls are enrolled at the school, which has the corporate structure of a charitable trust and is a member of the Independent Association of Preparatory Schools. Entry is non-selective, and classes are small and of mixed abilities. The school became co-educational in 2012, reversing a change to boys-only enrolment that had been made in the 1950s. In 2015, the school lowered its leaving age from 13 to 11 on account of the lowering of entry ages by independent secondary schools nearby.

The school's separate buildings for preparatory and pre-preparatory years are set around central playing fields. Facilities include a multi-purpose sports hall, indoor heated swimming pool, and floodlit artificially turfed courts. Additional playing fields are off-site. Classrooms have interactive whiteboards and WiFi connects all classrooms.

The Independent Schools Inspectorate (ISI) report of its integrated inspection of Chinthurst School in December 2014 stated that "Throughout the school, the curriculum ... exceeds the range of subjects usually found in English schools. ... Sport and physical education are notable strengths. ... The provision of extra-curricular clubs and activities, including for children in the [Early Years Foundation Stage], is excellent."

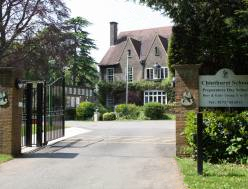
Chinthurst School entrance

== Academic and other achievements ==
Chinthurst School was assessed by the ISI's 2016 integrated inspection report as being "successful in meeting its aim to produce well-rounded individuals" and "very successful in preparing pupils for their move to senior schools". The school "provides a broad and balanced curriculum with an excellent range of extra-curricular activities" and "succeeds extremely well in fulfilling its aim to teach consideration for others, traditional values and respect for the community ... pupils are extremely well behaved, and relationships between pupils and staff and among the pupils themselves are excellent." The school has said itself that it outperforms national standards for both state and independent schools.

Pupils were assessed in 2016 as achieving well in music, art and drama and in a wide range of extra-curricular activities. Prior to 2016 almost all leavers gained places at their first-choice senior school and a proportion of pupils won scholarships and awards. In December 2016 the externally moderated Profile Results for the Early Years Foundation Stage 2015–2016 were 100 per cent for each pupil in the Stage. In March 2017 the school reported that on the basis of their 11-plus examinations, its eighteen Year 6 pupils had so far received 38 offers of places to 15 independent and state schools, nearly half of which included awards for academics, sport, music, art and drama.

== History ==
Chinthurst School was founded in 1908 by Alice Katherine Atkins in a perfume factory. Two years later, the first dedicated school building was erected on farmland at the present site. Records from the school's early days have not survived. However, it is apparent that under Miss Atkins and her headmistress in the 1910s, Miss Thwaites, the establishment was principally a girls' school that accepted a limited number of boarders. The archaeologist Aileen Fox (then Aileen Henderson) remembered, on joining the school as an 11-year-old in 1918:

Chinthurst was run by the formidable Miss Thwaites, and took some thirty girls, some of them boarders, between the ages of eight and fifteen. We were divided into three classes, mostly taught by Miss Thwaites ... a Dickensian figure, shabbily dressed, thin, erect, with a sallow complexion, a pointed nose, dark eyes and a penetrating voice. She was a good teacher though severe and had little patience with the mediocre or lazy child.

In 1934, a Major Bradley bought the school for his son and bride as a wedding present. Described as "liberal for the time", it appears to have been reasonably prosperous as a co-educational day and boarding school. More buildings were added in this period.

After the second world war, Chinthurst remained a co-educational day and boarding school until the Bradleys sold the school in 1953 to Ronald Kelley and his wife, Joan. Kelley remained headmaster until his retirement in 1977.

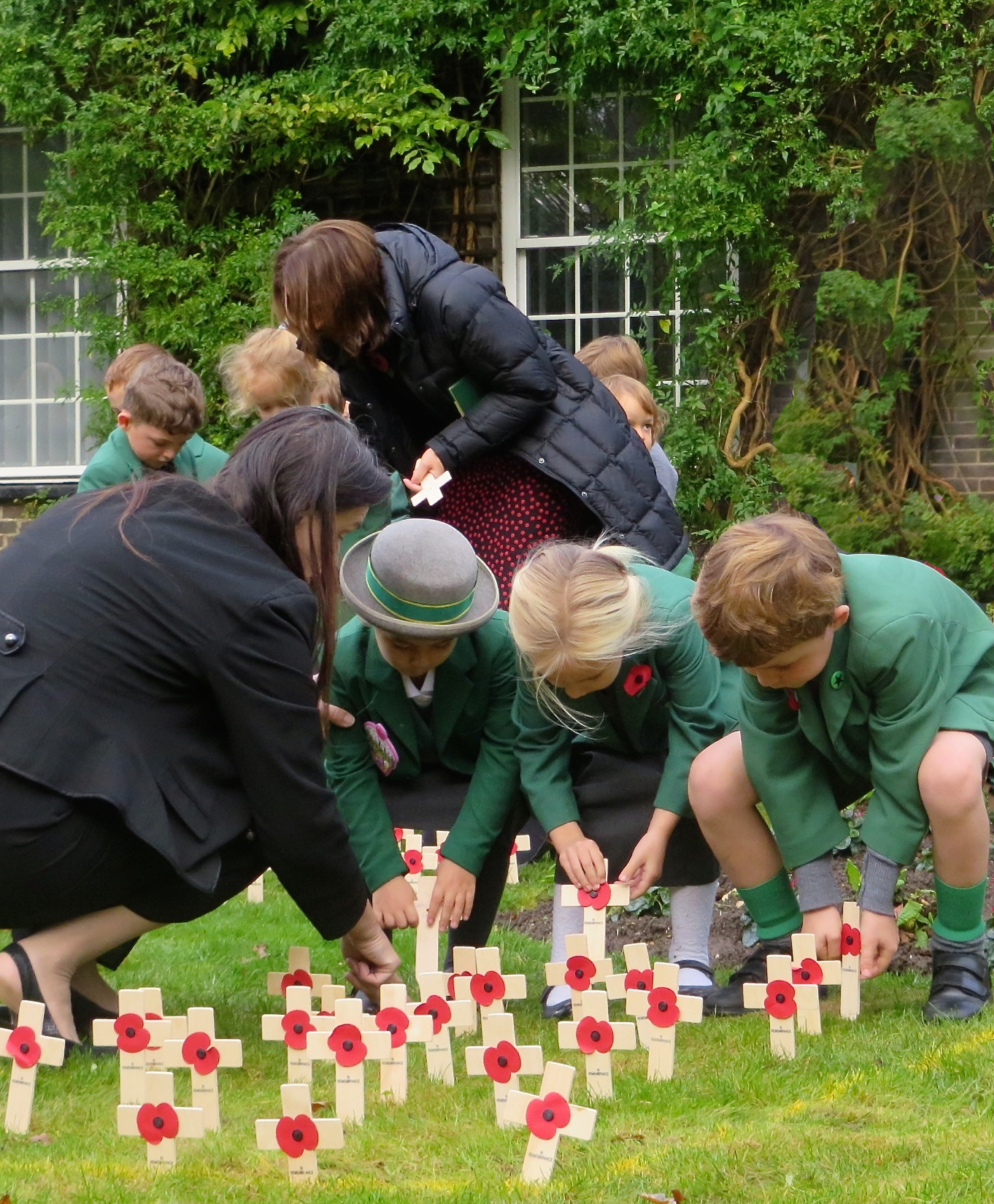
Chinthurst School pupils placing commemorative crosses into lawn on Remembrance Day

Within a few years of taking over, Ronald Kelley changed Chinthurst into a boys' prep school. In doing so, boarding was phased out and girls were no longer taught. In 1976, the school was changed from a proprietary business to an educational trust, and the Reverend Brian Batty became headmaster until 1982.

Headmaster Trevor Egan and his wife, Heather, were appointed in 1983. Following their retirement in 2009, Ian Thorpe was appointed headmaster. From 2012, the school enrolled girls at all grades in response to demand.

== Integration with the RGS Group ==
On 20 February 2017, the RGS Group, comprising Reigate Grammar School (RGS) and Reigate St Mary's Preparatory and Choir School, announced "new long term commitments" under which Chinthurst School would operate in partnership with the group for mutual support, experience and expertise. Chinthurst's Chair of Governors said that "The landscape by which we operate has changed significantly; smaller preparatory schools increasingly need the resilience of being part of a larger entity" and added: "The children will benefit in many ways, including the option of an early offer [from Reigate Grammar School] if it is the school of choice. However, for those parents who wish their children to go to the many other [independent secondary] schools in the area, Chinthurst will continue to prepare them for the 11 plus [examination] as we do now."

The Chinthurst Educational Trust remained as the school's controlling corporate entity. As part of the introduced changes, four RGS nominees replaced all but two governors on the Chinthurst board; those two Chinthurst governors joined the Reigate Grammar School and Reigate St Mary's School board, together with two other former Chinthurst governors; and Cathy Trundle, the Deputy Head (Pastoral) at Reigate St Mary's replaced Chinthurst School's Headmaster, Tim Button.

== Notable alumni ==
- Alistair Darling, politician, Chancellor of the Exchequer, member of Parliament
- Warwick Davis, actor and television presenter
- Aileen Fox, archaeologist
- Henry Smith, politician, member of Parliament
