= Judith Clegg =

British management consultant

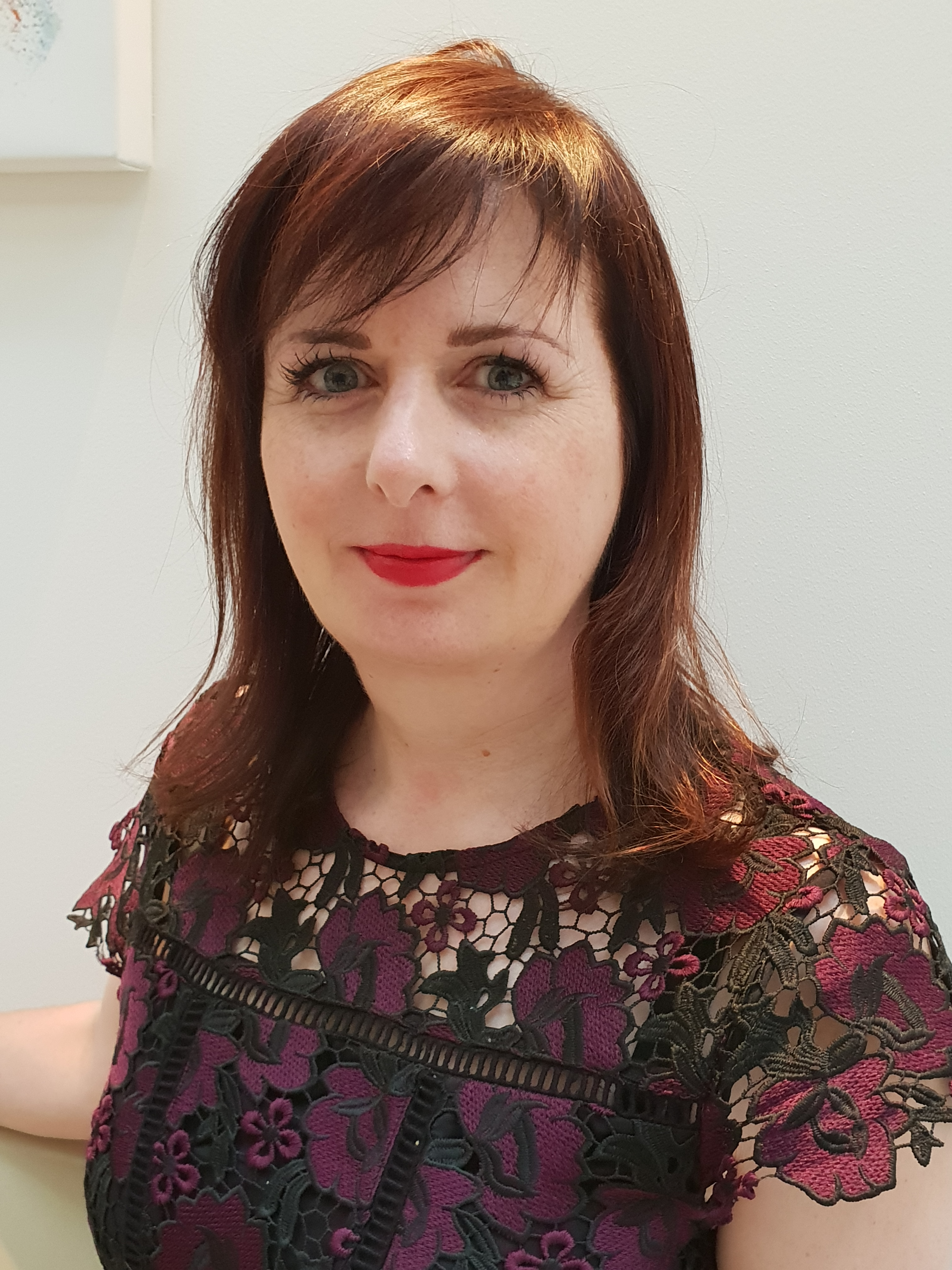
- Compassion in Commerce back cover

Judith Caroline Clegg is a British strategy consultant, technology entrepreneur, and author. She is the founder and CEO of Takeout, a strategy consultancy based in London and New York City, and founder of The Glasshouse, a support network for tech entrepreneurs and investors. She was named one of the Fifty Most Influential Britons in Technology by The Daily Telegraph in 2009, and one of the Fifty Most Inspiring Women in European Tech by the Inspiring Fifty organisation in 2015. Judith co-created two initiatives that launched in the House of Commons: PAWS – The Policy for Animal Welfare Scheme and The #HANDSOFF Campaign.

== Education and personal life ==
Judith Clegg was introduced to entrepreneurship at a young age by the examples of her father and grandfather, who were both technologists and entrepreneurs. Her father encouraged her and her sister to learn how to code when they were 7 or 8 years old. Judith attended an all-girls secondary school, and earned her bachelor of science degree, first class, in management science at Warwick Business School in 1993. Clegg was previously an avid sailor who has sailed the Pacific Ocean from Tahiti to Auckland, New Zealand, and is also a co-founder of the Battersea Courage Trust charity.

== Career ==
After graduation, she joined Arthur Andersen as a management consultant from 1993 to 1997.

In June 1998 she founded The Glasshouse, a support network for tech entrepreneurs and investors. The Glasshouse began hosting networking conferences, dubbed "Second Chance Tuesday", for 40 to 300 attendees in London; in 2010 it branched into New York City, Glasshouse networking events have also been held in San Francisco, Prague, and Sydney.

From 2004 to 2006, she was Associate Director of the Egremont Group, a private equity consultancy. From 2006 to 2007, she was an advisor to Ministry of Sound, and from 2008 to 2009 was an interim director of loyalty marketing for Barclaycard. From 2008 to 2012, she was the non-executive director of Onalytica Ltd.

In February 2006, Clegg founded Venturing Unlimited, later renamed Takeout. Described as a "boutique consultancy", Takeout is a tech cluster that unites large companies with entrepreneurs and startup companies to "find new revenue streams, new markets, new partners, and new lines of business".

Clegg was also co-CEO, with Gill Sinclair, of Ancient Roots, a company focusing on "ancient wisdom" applied to modern health and wellbeing. She has been an advisor or angel investor in So Far Sounds, Not Safe For Work Corporation, True Office, and Onalytica.

In 2018 Judith and Cher Chevalier co-created PAWS – The Policy for Animal Welfare Scheme – launched in the House of Commons, co-hosted by Henry Smith MP. Judith and Cher also co-created The Compassion in Commerce Training Program, co-authored the book Compassion in Commerce – The Power of Good Business, and co-created The #HANDSOFF Campaign – launched in the House of Commons, co-hosted by Jess Phillips MP.

== Honours and awards ==
In 2015 she was named one of the Fifty Most Inspiring Women in European Tech by the Inspiring Fifty organisation. As well as this, Wired has listed Clegg on their Wired 100: Top Digital Power Brokers in Britain for three years running, ranking her No. 97 in 2010, No. 77 in 2011, and No. 82 in 2012. In 2009 Clegg was ranked No. 47 of the 50 Most Influential Britons in Technology by The Daily Telegraph.

== Selected articles ==
- "How Start-Up Culture Can Change the World". The Huffington Post.
