= Crawley (constituency) =

UK Parliament constituency (since 1983)

Coordinates: 51.13°N 0.183°W

- Borough constituency for the House of Commons
- Interactive map of boundaries from 1997
- Boundary of Crawley in South East England
- County: West Sussex
- Electorate: 74,446 (2023)
- Major settlements: Crawley

Current constituency
- Created: 1983
- Member of Parliament: Peter Lamb (Labour)
- Seats: One
- Created from: Horsham and Crawley and Mid Sussex

Crawley is a constituency (Note: A borough constituency (for the purposes of election expenses and type of returning officer)) in West Sussex represented in the House of Commons of the UK Parliament since 2024 by Peter Lamb of the Labour Party. (Note: As with all constituencies, the constituency elects one Member of Parliament (MP) by the first past the post system of election at least every five years.)

== Constituency profile ==
The Crawley constituency is located in West Sussex. It covers the large town of Crawley and is coterminous with its borough. Traditionally a rural market town, Crawley grew rapidly after World War II when it was designated as a new town to accommodate the London overspill. The constituency includes Gatwick Airport, the country's second-busiest airport and a significant local employer. Deprivation in the town is above average, particularly in the neighbourhoods of Broadfield and Bewbush, whilst the village of Worth is in the 10% least-deprived areas of England.

On average, residents of Crawley are young and have low levels of education and professional employment compared to nationwide figures. In the 2021 census, 73% of residents were White. Asians formed the largest ethnic minority group at 15%, concentrated in the Langley Green area where they made up around a third of the population. At the local council level, most of the town is represented by Labour Party councillors whilst the wealthier areas in the south-east of the town elected Conservatives. An estimated 58% of voters in Crawley favoured leaving the European Union in the 2016 referendum, a higher percentage than the country as a whole (52%).

== Boundaries ==
1983–1997: The Borough of Crawley, and the District of Mid Sussex wards of Balcombe, Copthorne and Worth, Crawley Down, Slaugham, and Turners Hill.

1997–present: The Borough of Crawley.

The Boundary Commission analysed population increase and recommended that changes to the constituency be made for the 2010 general election so the seat is now coterminous with the borough.

The 2023 review of Westminster constituencies left the boundaries unchanged.

== History ==
=== Contents and context ===
Before the 1983 general election, Crawley had been part of the Horsham & Crawley, Horsham, and Horsham & Worthing constituencies at times. Due to the growth of Crawley, which was a small town, into a substantial new town in the 1960s and 70s, the Boundary Commission took the decision to separate it from Horsham in 1983 and create a new seat.

=== Political history ===
The constituency of Crawley is a bellwether seat, having elected an MP from the Party which won each general election since its creation in 1983. Its first MP was Conservative Nicholas Soames, a grandson of former prime minister Sir Winston Churchill. Having been re-elected in 1987 and 1992, he stood down for the 1997 election and was selected for and won the neighbouring seat of Mid Sussex, which he continued to represent until his retirement in 2019.

The seat was subsequently won by Laura Moffatt of the Labour Party with 'safe' majorities in 1997 and 2001. Labour retained the seat with the most marginal result in 2005 with a margin of only 37 votes.

In the 2010 election Conservative, Henry Smith, won the seat having twice failed, by 5,928 votes. He gained a not unprecedented (averaged two-party) swing of 6.3%. Smith's later majorities have been 6,526 in 2015; and 2,459 in 2017, elections where the Liberal Democrats, Scepanovic, along with the 2017 candidate for East Worthing and Shoreham in West Sussex lost their deposits by failing to attract 5% of the vote. In 2019, the Liberal Democrat Candidate, Khalil Yousuf increased the Liberal Democrat vote share by 1.7% against the last election, keeping their deposit.

Smith won again in 2019 with an increased majority over Labour candidate Peter Lamb. In 2024, Smith stood down and Lamb captured the seat after the Conservative vote more than halved.

== Members of Parliament ==
Horsham & Crawley and Mid Sussex prior to 1983

Election	Member	Party
1983	Nicholas Soames	Conservative
1997	Laura Moffatt	Labour
2010	Henry Smith	Conservative
2024	Peter Lamb	Labour

== Elections ==
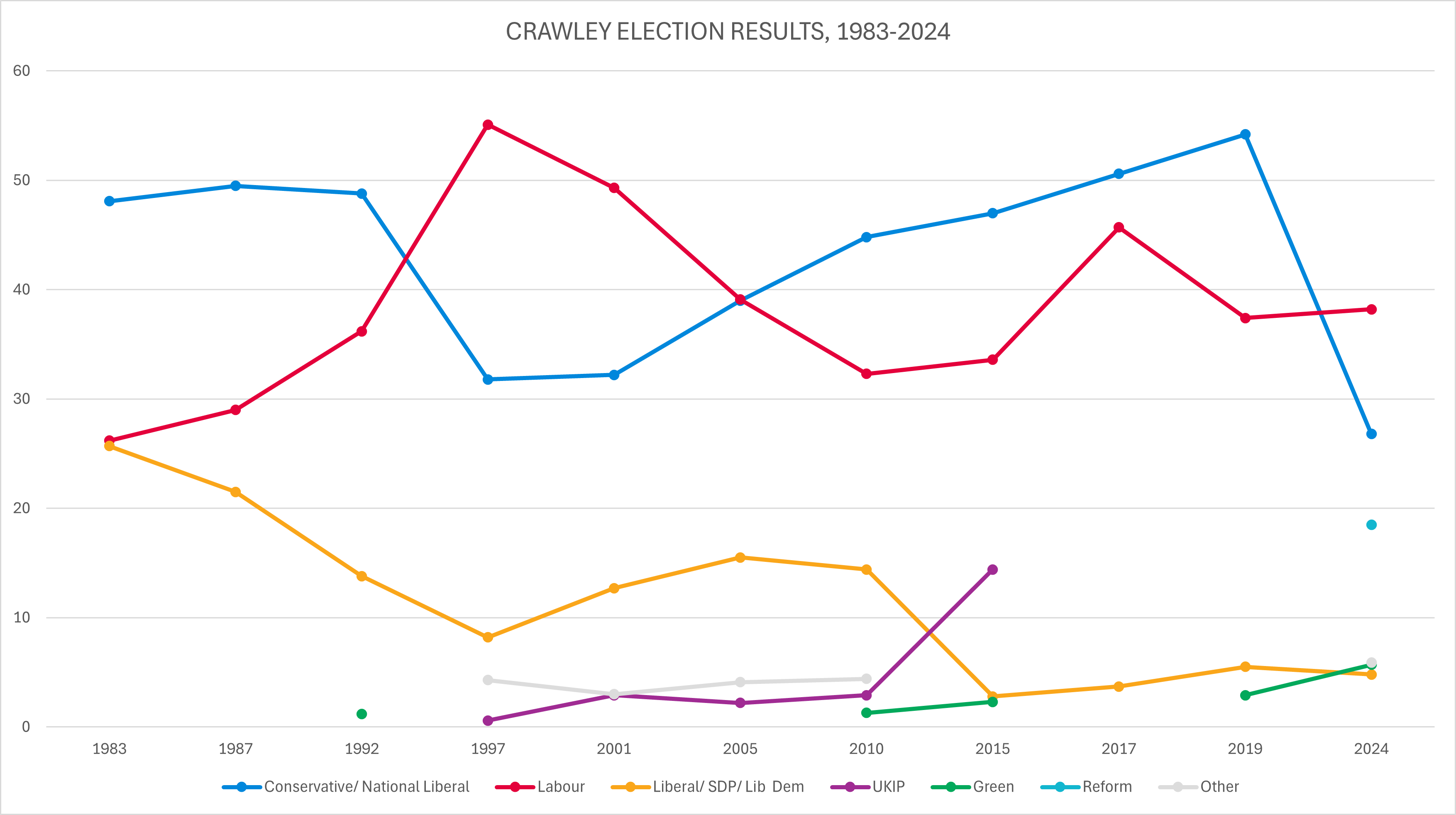
Election results 1983-2024

=== Elections in the 2020s ===
General election 2024: Crawley
Party	Candidate	Votes	%	±%
Labour	Peter Lamb	17,453	38.2	+0.8
Conservative	Zack Ali	12,218	26.8	−27.4
Reform UK	Tim Charters	8,447	18.5	N/A
Green	Iain Dickson	2,621	5.7	+2.8
Workers Party	Linda Bamieh	2,407	5.3	N/A
Liberal Democrats	Lee Gibbs	2,205	4.8	−0.7
TUSC	Robin Burnham	153	0.3	N/A
Heritage	Dan Weir	138	0.3	N/A
Majority		5,235	11.5	−5.3
Turnout		45,642	59.6	−7.4
Labour gain from Conservative		Swing	+14.1	

=== Elections in the 2010s ===
General election 2019: Crawley
Party	Candidate	Votes	%	±%
Conservative	Henry Smith	27,040	54.2	+3.6
Labour	Peter Lamb	18,680	37.4	−8.3
Liberal Democrats	Khalil Yousuf	2,728	5.5	+1.8
Green	Iain Dickson	1,451	2.9	New
Majority		8,360	16.8	+11.9
Turnout		49,899	67.2	−1.3
Conservative hold		Swing	+5.9	

The Brexit Party announced Wayne Bayley as their candidate, but he was withdrawn as part of the UK-wide Brexit Party decision not to oppose sitting Conservative candidates.

General election 2017: Crawley
Party	Candidate	Votes	%	±%
Conservative	Henry Smith	25,426	50.6	+3.6
Labour	Tim Lunnon	22,969	45.7	+12.1
Liberal Democrats	Marko Scepanovic	1,878	3.7	+0.9
Majority		2,457	4.9	−8.5
Turnout		50,273	68.5	+2.8
Conservative hold		Swing	-4.25	

The Green Party announced Richard Kail as their candidate, but he did not stand. UKIP also decided not to stand a candidate for the first time since 1997.

General election 2015: Crawley
Party	Candidate	Votes	%	±%
Conservative	Henry Smith	22,829	47.0	+2.2
Labour	Chris Oxlade	16,303	33.6	+1.3
UKIP	Christopher Brown	6,979	14.4	+11.5
Liberal Democrats	Sarah Osborne	1,339	2.8	−11.6
Green	Guy Hudson	1,100	2.3	+1.0
Majority		6,526	13.4	+0.9
Turnout		48,550	65.7	+0.4
Conservative hold		Swing	+0.5	

The Christian Peoples Alliance announced Katherine Mills as candidate, but she did not stand.

General election 2010: Crawley
Party	Candidate	Votes	%	±%
Conservative	Henry Smith	21,264	44.8	+5.8
Labour	Chris Oxlade	15,336	32.3	−6.8
Liberal Democrats	John Vincent	6,844	14.4	−1.1
BNP	Richard Trower	1,672	3.5	+0.5
UKIP	Chris French	1,382	2.9	+0.7
Green	Phil Smith	598	1.3	New
Justice Party	Arshad Khan	265	0.6	+0.1
Independent	Andrew Hubner	143	0.3	New
Majority		5,928	12.5	N/A
Turnout		47,504	65.3	+6.9
Conservative gain from Labour		Swing	+6.3	

=== Elections in the 2000s ===
General election 2005: Crawley
Party	Candidate	Votes	%	±%
Labour	Laura Moffatt	16,411	39.1	−10.2
Conservative	Henry Smith	16,374	39.0	+6.8
Liberal Democrats	Rupert Sheard	6,503	15.5	+2.8
BNP	Richard Trower	1,277	3.0	New
UKIP	Ronald Walters	935	2.2	−0.7
Democratic Socialist Alliance – People Before Profit	Robin Burnham	263	0.6	New
Justice Party	Arshad Khan	210	0.5	−0.2
Majority		37	0.1	−17.0
Turnout		41,973	58.4	+3.2
Labour hold		Swing	−8.5	

General election 2001: Crawley
Party	Candidate	Votes	%	±%
Labour	Laura Moffatt	19,488	49.3	−5.8
Conservative	Henry Smith	12,718	32.2	+0.4
Liberal Democrats	Linda Seekings	5,009	12.7	+4.5
UKIP	Brian Galloway	1,137	2.9	+2.3
Monster Raving Loony	Claire Staniford	383	1.0	New
Justice Party	Arshad Khan	271	0.7	+0.2
Socialist Labour	Karl Stewart	260	0.7	New
Socialist Alliance	Muriel Hirsch	251	0.6	New
Majority		6,770	17.1	−6.2
Turnout		39,517	55.2	−17.7
Labour hold		Swing	−3.1	

=== Elections in the 1990s ===
General election 1997: Crawley
Party	Candidate	Votes	%	±%
Labour	Laura Moffatt	27,750	55.1	+14.7
Conservative	Josephine Crabb	16,043	31.8	−12.1
Liberal Democrats	Harold De Souza	4,141	8.2	−6.3
Referendum	Ronald Walters	1,931	3.8	New
UKIP	Eric Saunders	322	0.6	New
Justice Party	Arshad Khan	230	0.5	New
Majority		11,707	23.3	N/A
Turnout		50,417	72.9	−6.3
Labour gain from Conservative		Swing	+13.4	

This constituency underwent boundary changes between the 1992 and 1997 general
elections and thus change in share of vote is based on a notional calculation.

General election 1992: Crawley
Party	Candidate	Votes	%	±%
Conservative	Nicholas Soames	30,204	48.8	−0.7
Labour	Laura Moffatt	22,439	36.2	+7.2
Liberal Democrats	Gordon Seekings	8,558	13.8	−7.7
Green	Mark Wilson	766	1.2	New
Majority		7,765	12.6	−7.9
Turnout		61,967	79.2	+2.1
Conservative hold		Swing	−4.0	

=== Elections in the 1980s ===
General election 1987: Crawley
Party	Candidate	Votes	%	±%
Conservative	Nicholas Soames	29,259	49.5	+1.4
Labour	Paul Leo	17,121	29.0	+2.8
SDP	David Simmons	12,674	21.5	−4.2
Majority		12,138	20.5	−1.4
Turnout		59,054	77.1	+0.7
Conservative hold		Swing	−0.7	

General election 1983: Crawley
Party	Candidate	Votes	%	±%
Conservative	Nicholas Soames	25,963	48.1	
Labour	Leslie Allen	14,149	26.2	
SDP	Tom Forrester	13,900	25.7	
Majority		11,814	21.9	
Turnout		54,012	76.4	
Conservative win (new seat)				

== See also ==
- parliamentary constituencies in West Sussex
- List of parliamentary constituencies in the South East England (region)

== Sources ==
- Election result, 2005 (BBC)
- Election results, 1997 – 2001 (BBC)
- Election results, 1997 – 2001 (Election Demon)
- Election results, 1983 – 1992 (Election Demon)
- Election results, 1992 – 2005 (Guardian)
