= Peter Lamb (politician) =

British politician Labour (born 1986)

Peter Lamb MP
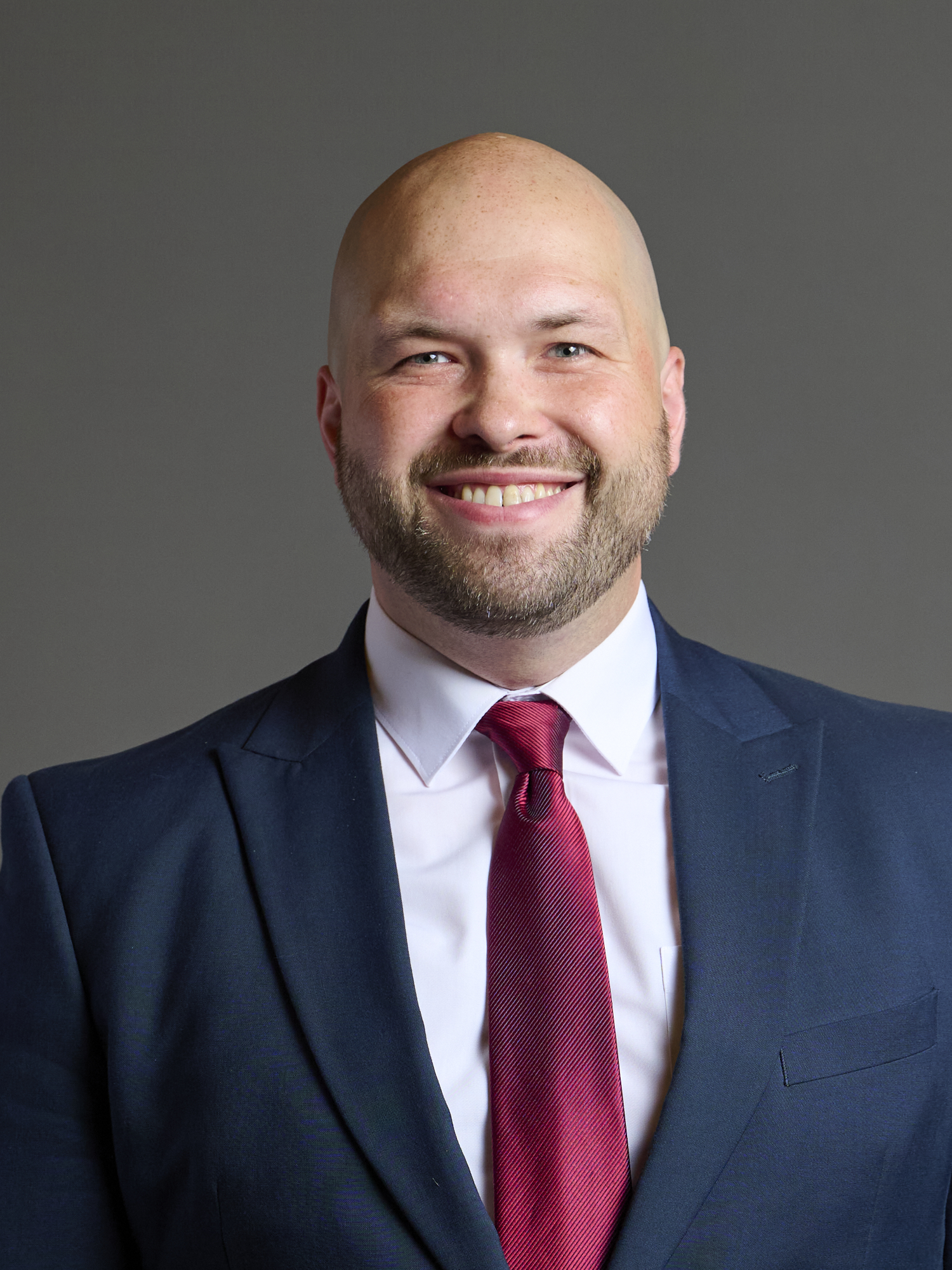
- Official portrait, 2024

Member of Parliament for Crawley
- Incumbent
- Assumed office 4 July 2024
- Preceded by: Henry Smith
- Majority: 5,235 (11.5%)

Leader of the Crawley Borough Council
- In office 2014 – 2022
- Preceded by: Howard Bloom
- Succeeded by: Michael Jones

Personal details
- Born: Peter Keir Lamb Crawley, West Sussex, England
- Party: Labour
- Education: University of Southampton (BA, MSc)

Peter Keir Lamb (born 1986) is a British politician who has served as Member of Parliament (MP) for Crawley since 2024. A member of the Labour Party, he served as Leader of Crawley Council from 2014 to 2022.

== Early life and education ==
Peter Keir Lamb was born in 1986 in Crawley, West Sussex. His mother was a social worker and his father was a scientist.

Lamb studied at Southampton University, where he received a Bachelor of Arts in Modern History and Politics in 2007 and a Master of Science in Citizenship and Governance in 2008.

== Political career ==
Lamb was born in Crawley and was a councillor for 14 years before becoming the area's MP. He is the third consecutive MP for the constituency to lose at the previous general election and then win it at the next.

According to PR Week, Lamb was a "senior consultant for The Campaign Company, which specialises in insight and engagement and works for clients including local authorities, central government departments, the NHS, charities and universities."

Lamb previously stood for Crawley in 2019, losing to then-incumbent Henry Smith by 8,360 votes.

Lamb was elected as the Member of Parliament for Crawley on 4 July 2024 with a majority of 5,235, defeating the Conservative candidate Zack Ali, the previous incumbent MP, Henry Smith, having stood down prior to the Election.

He was elected as a member of the Public Administration and Constitutional Affairs Committee in October 2024.

Being the MP for a constituency with a large community of Chagossians, he has shown interest in the debate related to the international status of the Chagos Islands. He has described the agreement to handing the islands over to Mauritius as "very disappointing" noting the lack of support among Chagossian people themselves. In January 2025, Lamb asserted that, contrary to David Lammy's claims, the British government has not engaged with the Chagossians throughout the process to strike a deal. He has also spoken of evidence that some of the Foreign Secretary's statements in the House of Commons "do not appear to be true."

In May 2025, he denounced the agreement for the return of the Chagos Archipelago to Mauritius by Great Britain, denouncing that the agreement contains none of the legal certainties necessary to guarantee the Chagossians, and those who reside in the United Kingdom, the possibility of accessing the islands or allowing permanent habitation.

In June 2025, Lamb denounced the proposed cuts to Personal Independence Payments (PIP) by Work and Pensions Secretary Liz Kendall, and was one of the over 120 Labour backbenchers to sign a reasoned amendment aiming to bring the proposal down. Following a government U-turn on the policy, which aimed to prevent or alleviate the rebellion, Lamb announced he would still be voting against the proposals: "This is ultimately still a cost-cutting measure...we're going to be taking billions of pounds out of the pockets of people with high levels of vulnerability when there are better alternatives on the table," he told the BBC. "I'll be a Labour MP when I vote down these proposals... I'll be living up to the spirit of the party". Lamb claimed he had advocated for a more preventative approach to mental health for over 3 months in private as a solution to the government's problems, yet said he had been ignored by ministers.

In the Labour deputy leadership election in Autumn 2025, Lamb supported Bell Ribeiro-Addy.
