= Horsham and Crawley =

Former parliamentary constituency in the United Kingdom

Coordinates: 51.092°N 0.233°W

- Former county constituency for the House of Commons

February 1974–1983
- Seats: one
- Created from: Horsham
- Replaced by: Crawley and Horsham

Horsham and Crawley was a parliamentary constituency centred on the towns of Horsham and Crawley in West Sussex. It returned one Member of Parliament (MP) to the House of Commons of the Parliament of the United Kingdom.

The constituency was created for the February 1974 general election, and abolished for the 1983 general election, when it was largely replaced by the new Horsham and Crawley constituencies.

== Boundaries ==
The Urban Districts of Horsham and Crawley, and the Rural District of Horsham.

== Members of Parliament ==
Election	Member	Party
Feb 1974	Peter Hordern	Conservative
1983	constituency abolished: see Horsham and Crawley	

== Elections ==
General election February 1974: Horsham and Crawley
Party	Candidate	Votes	%	±%
Conservative	Peter Hordern	31,802	42.40	
Labour	Ron Leighton	25,028	33.37	
Liberal	A Gill	18,167	24.22	
Majority		6,774	9.03	
Turnout		74,997	83.49	
Conservative win (new seat)				

General election October 1974: Horsham and Crawley
Party	Candidate	Votes	%	±%
Conservative	Peter Hordern	29,867	42.08	
Labour	Matthew Oakeshott	26,168	36.86	
Liberal	P Greenwood	13,848	19.51	
National Front	A Brewer	1,101	1.55	New
Majority		3,699	5.22	
Turnout		70,984	78.05	
Conservative hold		Swing		

General election 1979: Horsham and Crawley
Party	Candidate	Votes	%	±%
Conservative	Peter Hordern	42,529	52.21	
Labour	PW Newman	27,508	33.77	
Liberal	MH Foley	10,920	13.41	
National Front	A Murch	493	0.61	
Majority		15,021	18.44	
Turnout		81,450	81.40	
Conservative hold		Swing		
