= Frederick Gough (MP for Horsham) =

British Territorial Army officer, company director and politician

Colonel Charles Frederick Howard Gough, MC, TD (16 September 1901 – 19 September 1977) was a British Territorial Army officer, company director and politician.

== Navy education ==
Gough was educated at Cheam School and then enrolled as an officer cadet in the Royal Naval College, Osborne, where he won an Honourable Mention in 1915. From there he went on to the Royal Naval College, Dartmouth. However, Gough disliked the Royal Navy, and after three years serving as a midshipman on HMS Ramillies and HMS Witherington, he left.

== Business ==
Originally intending to go into farming and horse-breeding in India (his father had been a Lieutenant-Colonel in the Indian Army and he had been born there at Kasauli), Gough returned to Britain after two years to join a firm of insurance brokers affiliated with Lloyd's of London. He became a director of several companies.

== Second World War ==
In 1924, Gough joined the London Rifle Brigade of the Territorial Army (TA), the part-time reserve of the British Army, where he served for five years. His service number was 31420. He rejoined the same regiment on the outbreak of the Second World War and served throughout. He fought in the Winter War for Finland and was a member of the Scots Guards 5th Battalion who were trained in skiing.

On his return he was posted to GHQ in France but was immediately caught up in the evacuation of Dunkirk where he was mentioned in despatches (he managed to get back to Britain on 1 June 1940).

He was then trained as a parachutist, and became the first person to be issued with the Royal Aero Club Parachutist Certificate. He was placed in command of the 1st Airborne Reconnaissance Squadron. The Squadron worked in North Africa and Italy in 1943, for which Gough won the Military Cross in connection with the landing at Taranto.

In September 1944 he fought at the Battle of Arnhem, briefly commanding the forces at Arnhem Bridge after Lieutenant Colonel John Frost was injured. He was taken prisoner when the force was overrun, but he escaped in April 1945 and joined up with American forces in Bavaria.

== Post-war ==
After demobilisation in 1945, Gough commanded the 11th Parachute Battalion, in the Territorial Army from February 1947 to 1948. He then decided to go into politics as a Conservative, and fought Lewisham South against Herbert Morrison in the 1950 general election. He was President of the South Lewisham Conservative Association for the next twenty years.

== Parliament ==
At the 1951 general election, Gough was elected as Member of Parliament for Horsham. In Parliament, Gough was particularly loyal to the Conservative government, especially over Suez. He particularly stood up for the interests of ex-servicemen, and was Chairman of the Royal Aero Club from 1958 to 1968. As the new town of Crawley was built in his constituency, Gough praised it as a success.

Gough announced his retirement from Parliament in March 1962, and left Parliament at the 1964 general election. He was President of the Horsham Conservative Association from 1970 until his death in 1977. Having been a prodigious correspondent to various newspapers, he found he had more time to contribute.

== Libel action ==
Gough was issued with a writ for libel in November 1967 by Robert Maxwell, then Labour MP for Buckingham, over a letter which Gough had written to the Illustrated London News inviting the editor of that newspaper to say whether Maxwell had been awarded the Military Cross. Gough apologised for the letter, accepting that it could be interpreted as suggesting Maxwell was falsely claiming the award.

== Later life ==
In April 1974, Gough said that in retrospect it was a mistake for the Conservative Party to have forced Sir Alec Douglas-Home out of the leadership in 1965. He lived to see the release of the film A Bridge Too Far, which he described as "[playing] ducks and drakes with historical facts in order to dish up an extravaganza fit for the American massed cinema market".

== Sources ==
- Obituary, The Times, 22 September 1977
- M. Stenton and S. Lees, "Who's Who of British MPs" Vol. IV (Harvester Press, 1981)

Parliament of the United Kingdom
Preceded by Earl Winterton	Member of Parliament for Horsham; 1951–1964	Succeeded by Peter Hordern
