= Worthing (constituency) =

Former parliamentary constituency in the United Kingdom

- Former borough constituency for the House of Commons
- County: West Sussex

1945–1997
- Seats: One
- Created from: Horsham and Worthing
- Replaced by: East Worthing and Shoreham and Worthing West

Worthing was a parliamentary constituency in West Sussex, centred on the town of Worthing in West Sussex. It returned one Member of Parliament (MP) to the House of Commons of the Parliament of the United Kingdom, elected by the first past the post system.

== History ==
The constituency was created for the 1945 general election by dividing Horsham and Worthing, and abolished for the 1997 general election. Its territory was then divided between the new constituencies of Worthing West and East Worthing and Shoreham.

== Members of Parliament ==
| Election | Member | Party |
|---|---|---|
| 1945 | Sir Otho Prior-Palmer | Conservative |
| 1964 | Sir Terence Higgins | Conservative |
| 1997 | constituency abolished | |

== Elections ==
=== Elections in the 1940s ===
General election 1945: Worthing
| Party | Candidate | Votes | % | ±% |
|---|---|---|---|---|
| Conservative | Otho Prior-Palmer | 31,337 | 64.45 | |
| Labour | Arthur Wellesley Wright | 11,570 | 23.43 | |
| Liberal | Walter Parnell-Smith | 6,483 | 13.13 | |
| Majority | | 19,767 | 40.02 | |
| Turnout | | 49,390 | 72.21 | |
| Registered electors | | 68,393 | | |
| Conservative win (new seat) | | | | |

=== Elections in the 1950s ===
General election 1950: Worthing
| Party | Candidate | Votes | % | ±% |
|---|---|---|---|---|
| Conservative | Otho Prior-Palmer | 29,475 | 66.76 | +3.31 |
| Labour | E Duchin | 10,028 | 22.71 | −0.72 |
| Liberal | William Horne | 4,647 | 10.53 | −2.60 |
| Majority | | 19.447 | 44.05 | +4.03 |
| Turnout | | 44,150 | 83.98 | +11.77 |
| Registered electors | | 52,573 | | |
| Conservative hold | | Swing | +2.02 | |

General election 1951: Worthing
| Party | Candidate | Votes | % | ±% |
|---|---|---|---|---|
| Conservative | Otho Prior-Palmer | 32,302 | 74.63 | +7.87 |
| Labour | Gerry Reynolds | 10,978 | 25.37 | +2.66 |
| Majority | | 21,324 | 49.26 | +5.21 |
| Turnout | | 43,280 | 79.96 | −4.02 |
| Registered electors | | 54,125 | | |
| Conservative hold | | Swing | +2.61 | |

General election 1955: Worthing
| Party | Candidate | Votes | % | ±% |
|---|---|---|---|---|
| Conservative | Otho Prior-Palmer | 31,106 | 77.12 | +2.49 |
| Labour | Brian Ronald Stevens | 9,231 | 22.88 | −2.49 |
| Majority | | 21,875 | 54.24 | +4.98 |
| Turnout | | 40,337 | 72.75 | −7.21 |
| Registered electors | | 55,449 | | |
| Conservative hold | | Swing | +2.49 | |

General election 1959: Worthing
| Party | Candidate | Votes | % | ±% |
|---|---|---|---|---|
| Conservative | Otho Prior-Palmer | 31,396 | 68.16 | −8.96 |
| Labour | Frederick Roy Mason | 7,618 | 16.54 | −6.34 |
| Liberal | Deryck Abel | 7,045 | 15.30 | New |
| Majority | | 23,778 | 51.62 | −2.62 |
| Turnout | | 46,059 | 76.12 | +3.37 |
| Registered electors | | 60,505 | | |
| Conservative hold | | Swing | -1.31 | |

=== Elections in the 1960s ===
General election 1964: Worthing
| Party | Candidate | Votes | % | ±% |
|---|---|---|---|---|
| Conservative | Terence Higgins | 30,203 | 61.02 | −7.14 |
| Liberal | Paul L Rose | 11,320 | 22.87 | +7.57 |
| Labour | Russell L Butler | 7,976 | 16.11 | −0.43 |
| Majority | | 18,883 | 38.15 | −13.48 |
| Turnout | | 49,499 | 79.93 | +3.81 |
| Registered electors | | 61,931 | | |
| Conservative hold | | Swing | -7.36 | |

General election 1966: Worthing
| Party | Candidate | Votes | % | ±% |
|---|---|---|---|---|
| Conservative | Terence Higgins | 29,903 | 59.59 | −1.43 |
| Labour | Anthony Lester | 10,281 | 20.49 | +4.38 |
| Liberal | Robert Roberts | 8,955 | 17.84 | −5.03 |
| Ind. Conservative | Edward Moloney | 1,044 | 2.08 | New |
| Majority | | 19,622 | 39.10 | +0.95 |
| Turnout | | 50,183 | 75.71 | −4.22 |
| Registered electors | | 66,279 | | |
| Conservative hold | | Swing | -2.91 | |

=== Elections in the 1970s ===
General election 1970: Worthing
| Party | Candidate | Votes | % | ±% |
|---|---|---|---|---|
| Conservative | Terence Higgins | 33,051 | 65.61 | |
| Labour | Suzanne M Bartlett | 8,989 | 17.84 | |
| Liberal | Michael J Rooke | 8,336 | 16.55 | |
| Majority | | 24,062 | 47.77 | |
| Turnout | | 50,376 | 69.99 | |
| Conservative hold | | Swing | | |

General election February 1974: Worthing
| Party | Candidate | Votes | % | ±% |
|---|---|---|---|---|
| Conservative | Terence Higgins | 33,613 | 59.41 | |
| Liberal | MHC Foley | 14,683 | 25.95 | |
| Labour | Michael Neves | 8,286 | 14.64 | |
| Majority | | 18,930 | 33.46 | |
| Turnout | | 56,582 | 78.43 | |
| Conservative hold | | Swing | | |

General election October 1974: Worthing
| Party | Candidate | Votes | % | ±% |
|---|---|---|---|---|
| Conservative | Terence Higgins | 30,036 | 58.19 | |
| Liberal | MHC Foley | 12,691 | 24.59 | |
| Labour | Michael Neves | 8,890 | 17.22 | |
| Majority | | 17,345 | 33.60 | |
| Turnout | | 51,617 | 71.10 | |
| Conservative hold | | Swing | | |

General election 1979: Worthing
| Party | Candidate | Votes | % | ±% |
|---|---|---|---|---|
| Conservative | Terence Higgins | 33,624 | 61.22 | |
| Liberal | B Sudbury | 13,244 | 24.11 | |
| Labour | K Underwood | 7,163 | 13.04 | |
| National Front | A Hough | 893 | 1.63 | New |
| Majority | | 20,380 | 37.11 | |
| Turnout | | 54,924 | 73.27 | |
| Conservative hold | | Swing | | |

=== Elections in the 1980s ===
General election 1983: Worthing
| Party | Candidate | Votes | % | ±% |
|---|---|---|---|---|
| Conservative | Terence Higgins | 32,807 | 60.9 | −0.3 |
| Alliance | Bob Clare | 17,554 | 32.6 | +8.5 |
| Labour | Ashley Minto | 3,158 | 5.7 | −6.3 |
| National Front | Martin Wingfield | 292 | 0.5 | New |
| BNP | D Monks | 103 | 0.2 | New |
| Majority | | 15,253 | 28.3 | −8.8 |
| Turnout | | 53,914 | 71.2 | −2.1 |
| Conservative hold | | Swing | | |

General election 1987: Worthing
| Party | Candidate | Votes | % | ±% |
|---|---|---|---|---|
| Conservative | Terence Higgins | 34,579 | 61.7 | +0.8 |
| Alliance | Bob Clare | 16,072 | 28.7 | −3.9 |
| Labour | Jim L.W. Deen | 5,387 | 9.6 | +3.9 |
| Majority | | 18,501 | 33.0 | +4.7 |
| Turnout | | 56,032 | 72.8 | +1.6 |
| Conservative hold | | Swing | | |

=== Elections in the 1990s ===
General election 1992: Worthing
| Party | Candidate | Votes | % | ±% |
|---|---|---|---|---|
| Conservative | Terence Higgins | 34,198 | 57.0 | −4.7 |
| Liberal Democrats | Sue Bucknall | 17,665 | 29.4 | +0.7 |
| Labour | Jim L.W. Deen | 6,679 | 11.1 | +1.5 |
| Green | P.J. Beever | 806 | 1.3 | New |
| Liberal | Nicholas J. Goble | 679 | 1.1 | New |
| Majority | | 16,533 | 27.5 | −5.5 |
| Turnout | | 60,027 | 77.4 | +4.6 |
| Conservative hold | | Swing | -2.7 | |
