= Otho Prior-Palmer =

Anglo-Irish British Army officer and Conservative politician

Brigadier Sir Otho Prior-Palmer DSO
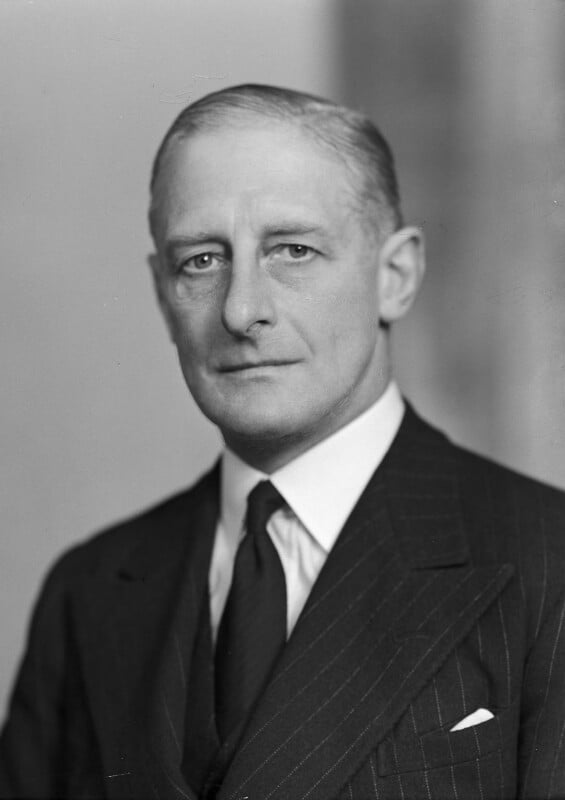
- Prior-Palmer in 1949

Member of Parliament for Worthing
- In office 5 July 1945 – 25 September 1964
- Preceded by: Constituency created
- Succeeded by: Terence Higgins

Personal details
- Born: 28 October 1897 Dublin, Ireland
- Died: 29 January 1986 (aged 88) Honiton, Devon, England
- Party: Conservative
- Spouses: Barbara Frankland (m. 1926; div. 1936) Sheila Weller-Poley (m. 1940; div. 1964) Elizabeth Mary Adams Henderson (m. 1964)
- Relations: George Erroll Prior-Palmer (brother); Lucinda Prior-Palmer (niece)
- Children: 7
- Education: RMC Sandhurst
- Civilian awards: Knight Bachelor

Military service
- Allegiance: United Kingdom
- Branch/service: British Army
- Years of service: 1916–1946
- Rank: Brigadier
- Commands: 7th Armoured Brigade (1943–1945); 8th Armoured Brigade (1943); 29th Armoured Brigade (1942–1943); 30th Armoured Brigade (1942); Northamptonshire Yeomanry (1940–1942)
- Battles/wars: First World War; Second World War
- Military awards: Distinguished Service Order
- Service No.: 13090

Brigadier Sir Otho Leslie Prior-Palmer, DSO (28 October 1897 – 29 January 1986) was an Anglo-Irish British Army officer and Conservative Party politician. He served for nearly twenty years as a Member of Parliament for Worthing. His main contributions were on the subject of defence, on which he was sometimes roused to outspoken criticism of the opposition Labour Party.

== Early career ==
Prior-Palmer was born in Ceylon (Sri Lanka), where his father, Spunner Prior-Palmer, owned Glenalvah and Lliskillan Tea Plantions. When Otho Prior-Palmer was a child, the family moved to Ireland, where Spunner Prior-Palmer was a landowner in County Sligo. He was sent to Wellington College for his schooling, and joined the British Army immediately on leaving school. In 1916 he was commissioned into the 9th Lancers. He trained at the Royal Military College, Sandhurst. Later his younger brother George Erroll Prior-Palmer followed him through Wellington and Sandhurst into the same regiment.

== Recreations and family ==
During the inter-war period, Prior-Palmer took an interest in equestrianism while continuing in service with the Lancers. He owned a stud which bred horses for the Warwickshire Hounds, although he sometimes had to sell up when his leave was cancelled and he was posted abroad. He also enjoyed sailing in the late 1920s, and was a member of the Royal Yacht Squadron. In April 1929 he was seconded for service as an adjutant in a Territorial Army unit.

In July 1926 Prior-Palmer married Hon. Barbara Frankland. His interest in horses was also manifest in horse racing: he was at first a jockey. In the Sandown Park Grand Military Gold Cup of 1932, he rode "Master of Orange" and led in the early stages, before coming in second at the finish. Later he was an active trainer of race horses.

In March 1936, Prior-Palmer was promoted major. However, he sued for and was granted a divorce in 1936 on the grounds of his wife's adultery with Edward Agar, 5th Earl of Normanton, whom she subsequently married. On 11 May 1940 Prior-Palmer took as his second wife, Sheila Weller-Poley. His second wife was to be active in politics later as a Conservative and as Chairman of West Sussex County Council Education Committee.

== Second World War ==
During the Second World War, Prior-Palmer was placed in command of the 2nd Northamptonshire Yeomanry in 1940. In March 1942, he was transferred to command the 30th Armoured Brigade, and in August he moved to the 29th Armoured Brigade; both of these units were stationed in Britain. In 1943 Prior-Palmer was put in command of the 7th Armoured Brigade in Italy; this involved heavy fighting. In October 1944 his brigade made a particularly effective contribution to fighting around the Savio River. In 1945 he was awarded the Distinguished Service Order.

== Political career ==
At the 1945 general election, Prior-Palmer was selected as the Conservative Party candidate for Worthing, a new constituency which had been created in boundary changes just before the election. He was placed on retired pay by the army in 1946 with the honorary rank of brigadier.

In parliament, Prior-Palmer began his career by voting (along with many backbench Conservative MPs) against the large loan from the United States that the Labour government had negotiated after the end of Lend-Lease. However, these were the only dissenting votes he ever cast against the Conservative whip. In 1946 he argued for retaining conventional defence in addition to nuclear arms, because an answer would be found to the atomic bomb.

With an interest in army training and the cadet services, in May 1947 Prior-Palmer moved a new clause to the National Service Bill which would give an incentive to those who were called up for National Service after achieving a level of efficiency in the cadets. In March 1948 he went on a Parliamentary delegation to East Africa (Kenya, Uganda, Tanganyika and Zanzibar). Later that year he warned of the danger of invasion of the United Kingdom by air, and urged the creation of a force to tackle it.

His constituency was safely Conservative and Prior-Palmer had a majority of over 21,000 in the 1951 general election. In the first month of the new Parliament, with a Conservative government once again, he was required to apologise after being overheard saying that the Labour frontbencher and former Minister Jim Griffiths "had never done a damned day's work in his life". In May 1953 he launched a debate on the need for voluntary defence services. In September 1954 he was named on a delegation to visit the Soviet Union.

Prior-Palmer supported abolition of capital punishment in an unwhipped House of Commons vote in February 1956, one of only 48 Conservative MPs to do so. He backed the Eden government on the Suez Crisis, arguing that it took British and French intervention to get a United Nations force to come in. Having served as chair of the Conservative Backbenchers' Army sub-committee for most of the 1950s, he was made vice-chairman of the Defence Committee from 1958.

Knighted in 1959, Prior-Palmer was regarded as an 'elder statesman' but could still be angered by pacifist sentiment. In February 1960 he claimed that the Labour Party had "sent one of their chief leaders to Swaythling to stop men making Spitfires". Despite uproar among Labour MPs present, he refused to withdraw. In February 1961, Prior-Palmer signed, but later withdrew his name from, a motion critical of the constitutional development of Northern Rhodesia.

== Retirement ==
On 7 November 1963, Prior-Palmer announced that owing to "personal reasons and reasons of ill-health", he would not be a candidate at the next general election. He had in the meantime become involved in business in the field of commercial radio, as an investor. In 1964 he divorced his second wife and married his third, Elizabeth Henderson. They had two sons in the mid-1960s.

== Sources ==
- M. Stenton and S. Lees, "Who's Who of British MPs" Vol. IV (Harvester Press, 1981)
- "Who Was Who", A & C Black

Parliament of the United Kingdom
New constituency	Member of Parliament for Worthing; 1945–1964	Succeeded by Terence Higgins
