= Terence Higgins, Baron Higgins =

British politician (1928–2025)

The Right Honourable The Lord Higgins KBE PC DL
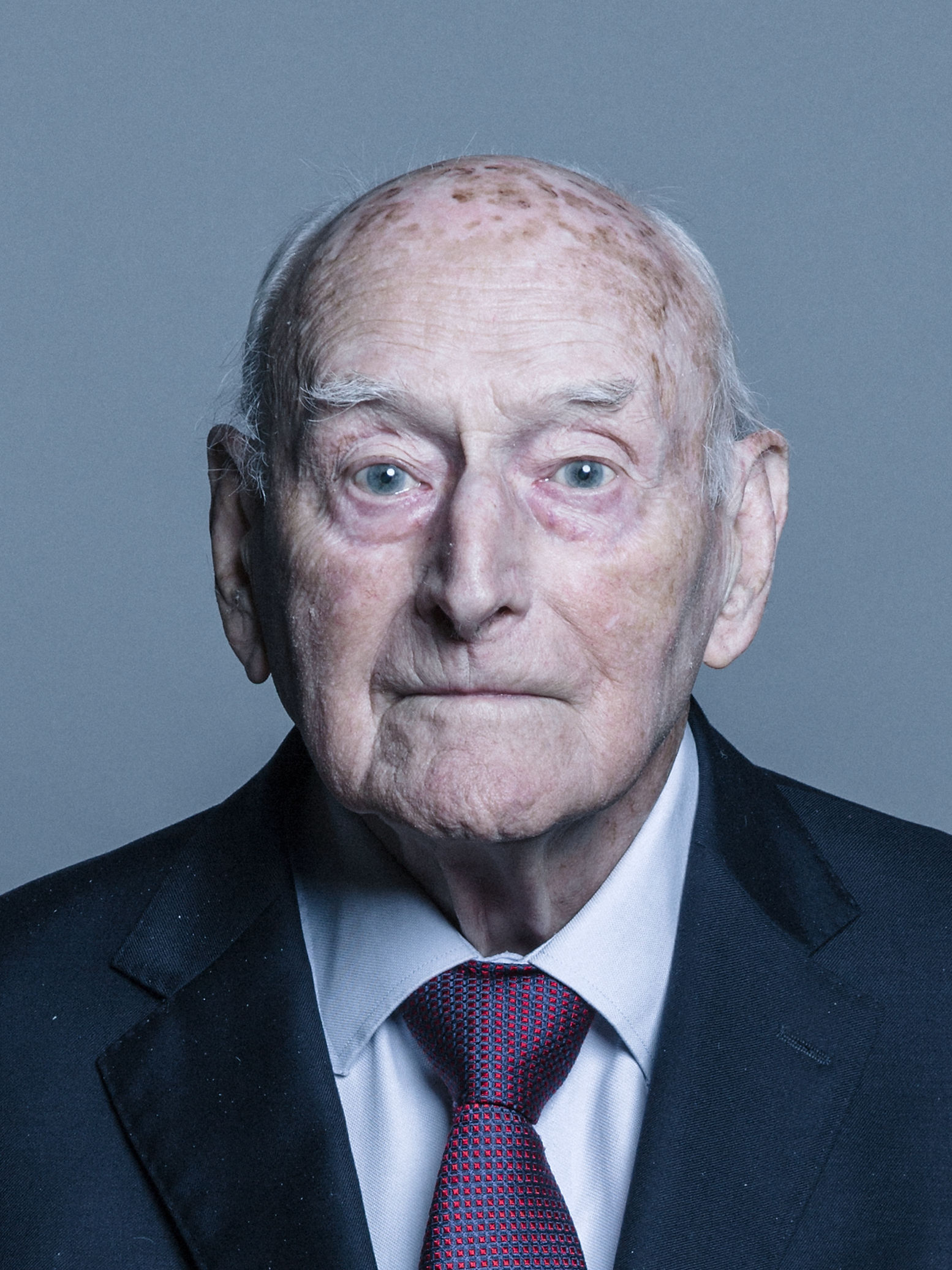
- Official portrait, 2018

Financial Secretary to the Treasury
- In office 7 April 1972 – 4 March 1974
- Prime Minister: Edward Heath
- Preceded by: Patrick Jenkin
- Succeeded by: John Gilbert

Member of Parliament for Worthing
- In office 15 October 1964 – 8 April 1997
- Preceded by: Otho Prior-Palmer
- Succeeded by: constituency abolished

Member of the House of Lords
- Lord Temporal
- Life peerage 28 October 1997 – 1 January 2019

Personal details
- Born: 18 January 1928 London, England
- Died: 25 November 2025 (aged 97)
- Party: Conservative
- Spouse: Rosalyn Higgins
- Children: 2
- Education: Gonville and Caius College, Cambridge

Terry Higgins
Sport
- Sport: Athletics
- Club: Herne Hill Harriers
Medal record
Men's athletics
Representing England
Commonwealth Games
Silver medal – second place	1950 Auckland	4×440 yard relay

Terence Langley Higgins, Baron Higgins, KBE, PC, DL (18 January 1928 – 25 November 2025) was a British Conservative Party politician and athlete who was a silver medalist at the Commonwealth Games for England. He competed in the men's 400 metres at the 1952 Summer Olympics.

== Life and career ==
Born in London on 18 January 1928, Higgins was educated at Alleyn's School, Dulwich. He served in the Royal Air Force from 1946 to 1948. He represented the Great Britain team at the 1948 Olympic Games in London and represented the Great Britain team again at the 1952 Olympic Games in Helsinki. In between he won a silver medal for the England athletics team at the 1950 British Empire Games in Auckland, New Zealand.

In 1948 he emigrated to New Zealand, where he worked for a shipping firm, but seven years later returned to Britain to study economics as a mature student at Gonville and Caius College, Cambridge. During his time at Cambridge, Higgins was President of the Cambridge Union. After graduating in 1958, he spent a year as an economics lecturer at Yale University before choosing to work for Unilever as an economist.

Higgins was the Member of Parliament for Worthing from 1964 to 1997, and Financial Secretary to the Treasury between 1972 and 1974. He became a Privy Councillor in 1979, and served on the Treasury Select Committee from 1979 to 1992 (serving as chairman from 1983 to 1992), and on the Liaison Committee from 1984 to 1997.

Higgins was created a life peer as Baron Higgins, of Worthing in the County of West Sussex on 28 October 1997. While in opposition, he served as the Conservative shadow minister for work and pensions in the House of Lords. He was appointed a Knight Commander of the Order of the British Empire in the 1993 New Years Honours List. Higgins retired from the House of Lords on 1 January 2019.

His wife, Dame Rosalyn Higgins, with whom he had two children, was the President of the International Court of Justice. Terence Higgins died on 25 November 2025, at the age of 97.

Parliament of the United Kingdom
Preceded by Sir Otho Prior-Palmer	Member of Parliament for Worthing; 1964–1997	constituency abolished
Political offices
Preceded by Patrick Jenkin	Financial Secretary to the Treasury; 1972–1974	Succeeded by John Gilbert
