= Nicholas Soames =

British politician (born 1948)

The Right Honourable The Lord Soames of Fletching PC
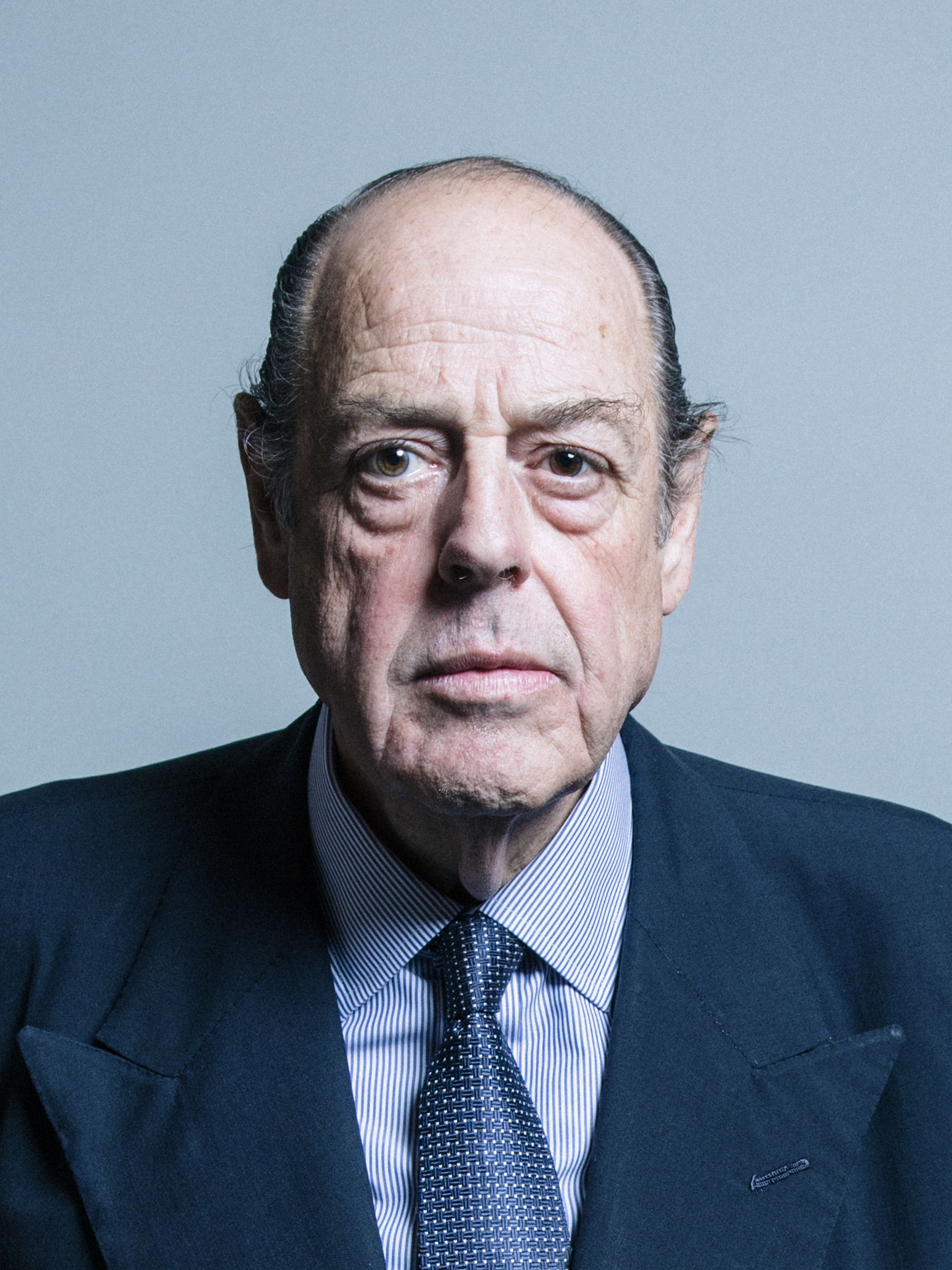
- Official portrait, 2017

Shadow Secretary of State for Defence
- In office 6 November 2003 – 10 May 2005
- Leader: Michael Howard
- Preceded by: Bernard Jenkin
- Succeeded by: The Marquess of Lothian

Minister of State for the Armed Forces
- In office 20 July 1994 – 2 May 1997
- Prime Minister: John Major
- Preceded by: Jeremy Hanley
- Succeeded by: John Reid

Parliamentary Secretary to the Ministry of Agriculture, Fisheries and Food
- In office 14 April 1992 – 20 July 1994
- Prime Minister: John Major
- Preceded by: David Maclean
- Succeeded by: Angela Browning

Member of the House of Lords
- Lord Temporal
- Life peerage 28 October 2022

Member of Parliament
- In office 9 June 1983 – 6 November 2019
- Preceded by: Peter Hordern
- Succeeded by: Mims Davies
- Constituency: Crawley (1983–1997); Mid Sussex (1997–2019)

Personal details
- Born: Arthur Nicholas Winston Soames; 12 February 1948 (age 78) Croydon, Surrey, England
- Party: Conservative (Note: Whip suspended from 3 September 2019 to 29 October 2019.)
- Spouses: Catherine Weatherall (m. 1981; div. 1988) Serena Smith (m. 1993)
- Children: 3
- Parent(s): Christopher Soames; Mary Churchill
- Relatives: Winston Churchill (grandfather); Rupert Soames (brother)
- Education: Eton College; Mons Officer Cadet School
- Website: Official website

Military service
- Allegiance: United Kingdom
- Branch/service: British Army
- Years of service: 1967–1975
- Rank: Second lieutenant
- Unit: 11th Hussars; Royal Hussars

Arthur Nicholas Winston Soames, Baron Soames of Fletching, PC (born 12 February 1948), is a British Conservative Party politician who served as the Member of Parliament (MP) for Mid Sussex from 1997 to 2019, having previously served as the MP for Crawley from 1983 to 1997.

Soames was Minister of State for the Armed Forces from 1994 to 1997 in the government of John Major. He had the whip removed on 3 September 2019, for voting against the government, before it was restored on 29 October. His main political interests are defence, international relations, rural affairs and industry. He is a grandson of former prime minister Winston Churchill.

== Early life, education and military service ==
Soames was born in 1948 in Croydon, Surrey, the eldest son of Christopher and Mary Soames. He is a grandson of the former British Prime Minister Winston Churchill, and a great-nephew of Lady Baden-Powell, World Chief Guide, the wife of the founder of the Scout movement, Lord Baden-Powell. Industrialist Rupert Soames is Soames's brother, and journalist Emma Soames is a sister.

Simon Hoggart, writing in The Guardian, related an anecdote of Soames's childhood: "He gave me the true version of what I had always suspected was an apocryphal story. In or around 1953, when Soames was five, he didn't know how important his grandfather was until someone told him. So he walked up to the old man's bedroom, managed to get past the valets and the secretaries, and found him sitting up in bed. 'Is it true, grandpapa, that you are the greatest man in the world?' he asked. 'Yes, I am,' said Churchill. 'Now bugger off.'"

After attending St. Aubyns Preparatory School in Sussex, Soames received his secondary education at Eton College. Later he studied at Mons Officer Cadet School before being commissioned into the 11th Hussars on 5 August 1967 on a Short Service Commission before serving in West Germany and Britain with the 11th Hussars and later the Royal Hussars. Soames was transferred to Regular Army Reserve of Officers on 9 March 1970 before resigning his commission on 5 August 1975.

== Early career ==
In 1970, he was appointed equerry to Charles, Prince of Wales (now Charles III); he has remained a close friend of the King ever since, and publicly criticised Diana, Princess of Wales, during the couple's estrangement. When Diana first accused the Prince of Wales of adultery with Camilla Parker Bowles, Soames told the BBC that the accusation, and Diana's fear of being slandered by her husband's courtiers, stemmed merely from Diana's mental illness, and "the advanced stages of paranoia". Charles later admitted his adultery and Soames apologised.

In 1972, he left Kensington Palace and the army to work as a stockbroker. In 1974, he became a personal assistant; first to Sir James Goldsmith and then in 1976 to United States Senator Mark Hatfield, whose employ he left in 1978 to become a director of Bland Welch, Lloyd's Brokers. Between 1979 and 1981, he was an assistant director of the Sedgwick Group. He fought Central Dunbartonshire in Scotland in 1979, where Labour's Hugh McCartney defeated him by 12,003 votes.

== Parliamentary career ==
Soames was elected as the MP for Crawley at the 1983 general election. He sat for Crawley until the 1997 general election (when Labour defeated the Conservatives in Crawley). In the 1997 election, he retained the constituency of Mid Sussex for the Conservatives after Tim Renton stood down at the election, and Soames remained the seat's MP from then until Parliament was dissolved in November 2019.

He served as a Parliamentary secretary at the Ministry of Agriculture, Fisheries and Food between 1992 and 1994, as Minister of State for the Armed Forces at the Ministry of Defence under Prime Minister John Major between 1994 and 1997, and later as the Shadow Secretary of State for Defence from 2003 to 2005.

In 2002 he was appointed to the parliamentary committee considering the future Hunting Act 2004 that banned hunting with dogs, a policy which he opposed.

On 9 May 2005, shortly after Michael Howard announced his intention to resign as leader of the Conservative Party, Soames resigned from the shadow cabinet.

With Frank Field he is a co-chairman of the Cross-Party Group on Balanced Migration, and has advocated in parliament and in the media that immigration to and emigration from the UK should be brought into balance. In parliament he has also spoken in favour of the introduction of a national identity card scheme and advocated them in the national media.

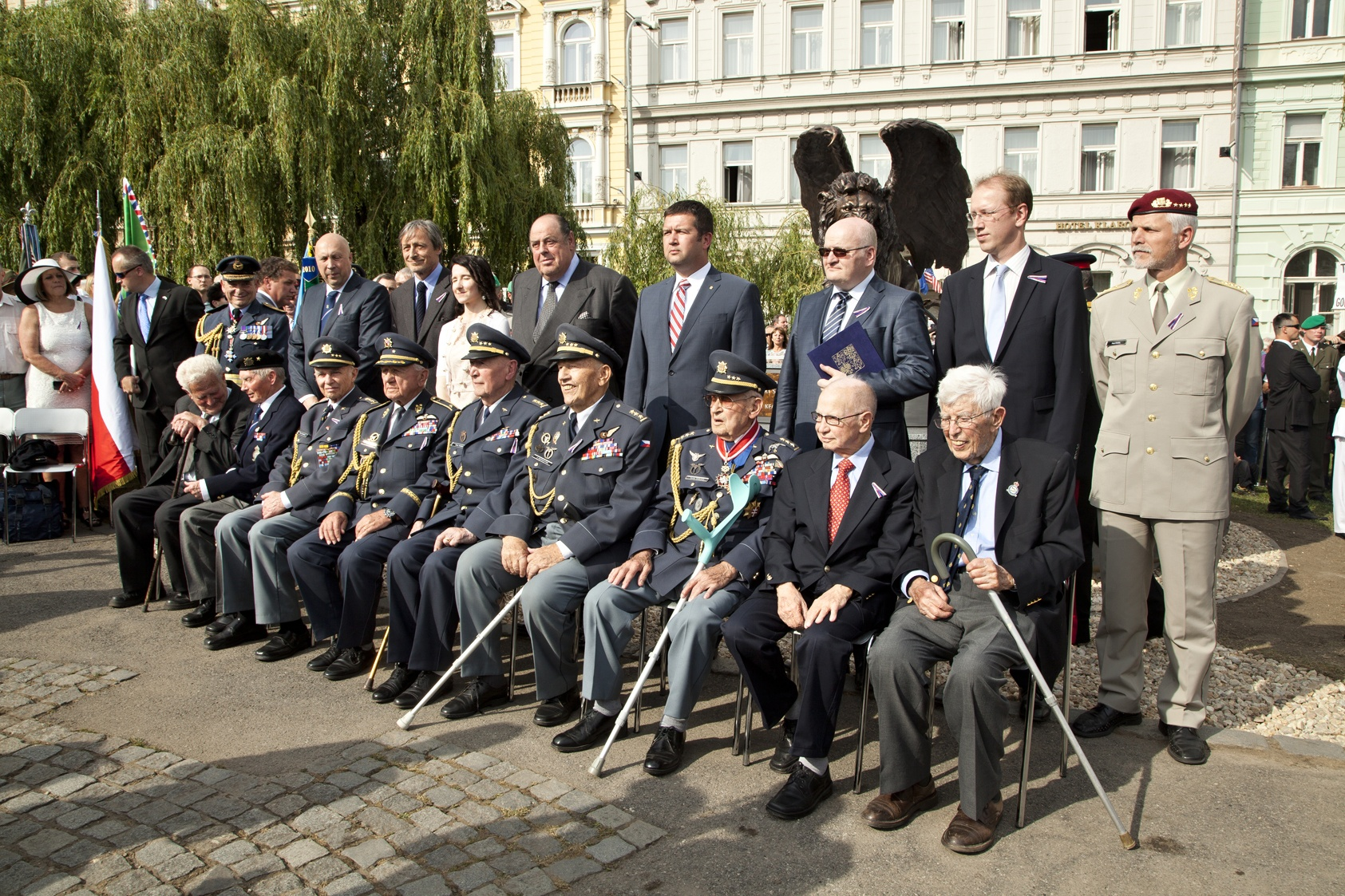
Soames with former Czechoslovak RAF members in Prague, Czech Republic, June 2014

Soames was opposed to Brexit prior to the 2016 EU membership referendum. In an interview before the referendum he described himself as a One Nation Tory on the soft right of the party, and compared Brexiteers to 'a growling Alsatian that must be kicked really hard in the balls'.

In April 2019, Soames condemned the United States for recognizing Israel's 1981 annexation of the Golan Heights. Soames said it was "a matter of the greatest regret that our allies, the United States, are in clear contravention of UN Resolution 497", adding that "annexation of territory is prohibited under international law."

Soames endorsed Rory Stewart during the 2019 Conservative leadership election.

=== Allegations of sexism ===
According to the book Women in Parliament published in 2005, Soames has been named as the most prolific source of vulgar and sexist comments in the Houses of Parliament, with several female MPs stating that he has made vulgar comments to them. Soames regarded the claims as 'nonsense'. Barbara Follett said in 2007 that Soames was the worst of the sexist MPs in parliament.

On 31 January 2017, Soames made 'woofing' noises at Tasmina Ahmed-Sheikh when she was asking the foreign secretary, Boris Johnson, a question in the House of Commons. Ahmed-Sheikh called a point of order to bring the Speaker's attention to the noises. John Bercow, the speaker, described the noises as "discourteous and that expression should not be used", and Soames was asked to apologise. He did so, saying he was only offering her a "friendly canine salute" in reply to her "snapped" question.

=== Removal and restoration of whip ===
On 3 September 2019, Soames joined 20 other rebel Conservative MPs to vote against the Conservative government of Boris Johnson and pass a motion allowing backbenchers to take control of the House of Commons timetable in order to pass a bill to stop a no-deal exit from the EU without parliamentary approval. Effectively, they helped block Johnson's Brexit plan from proceeding on 31 October. Subsequently, all 21 were advised that they had lost the Conservative whip, expelling them as Conservative MPs, requiring them to sit as independents. If Soames had decided to stand for re-election in a future election, the party would have blocked his selection as a Conservative candidate.

Soames announced that he would not be standing in the 2019 general election. On 29 October, Boris Johnson restored the whip for him and nine other MPs.

== Other political positions ==
After the World Central Kitchen aid convoy attack that killed seven aid workers in April 2024, he called for the British government to stop selling weapons to Israel. He also urged the government to recognise Palestine as a sovereign state based on the 1967 borders and described the UK as a "midwife at the birth of Israel".

== Inheritance tax relief ==
In one edition of The Mark Thomas Comedy Product, Mark Thomas investigated the practice of avoiding inheritance tax by declaring art, furniture, homes and land available for public viewing. After discovering that Soames was claiming tax relief on a "three-tier mahogany buffet with partially reeded slender balustrade upright supports" on this basis, but without making any arrangements for the furniture to be inspected by the public, Thomas invented a 'National Soames Day' on which hundreds of people made appointments to see the furniture. In 2015, Thomas told The Independent's Adam Jacques: "I try to find the good in my enemies. It's not unusual to be able to get on with people despite what they are doing being awful. The only person I have met who I considered to be without any redeeming features was [...] Nicholas Soames. [...] He was such a pantomime baddie."

== Aegis Defence Services ==
Soames was chairman of the private security contractor Aegis Defence Services which was bought in 2015 by GardaWorld, for which he now acts as a member of the International Advisory Board. Aegis had a series of contracts worth hundreds of millions of dollars to provide guards to protect US military bases in Iraq from 2004 onwards. From 2011, the company broadened its recruitment to take in African countries, having previously employed people from the UK, the US and Nepal.

Contract documents say that the soldiers from Sierra Leone were paid $16 (£11) a day. A documentary, The Child Soldier's New Job, broadcast in Denmark, alleges that the estimated 2,500 Sierra Leonean personnel who were recruited by Aegis and other private security companies to work in Iraq included former child soldiers.

== Other outside interests ==
He was a director of the liquidated company Framlington Second Dual Trust plc.

Soames is listed as a director of The Amber Foundation.

He was invited to ride in the King's procession at Royal Ascot 2023.

Soames also has a position as a senior advisor at Francis Maude Associates, a consultancy set up by Francis Maude.

He was an honorary colonel of the C (Kent and Sharpshooters Yeomanry) Squadron The Royal Yeomanry until 5 October 2023.

== Political funding ==
Mid Sussex Conservative Constituency Association has received over £1 million in donations, with Soames receiving well over £100,000 from private military company Aegis Defence Services Ltd from 2010 onwards. US multinational professional services, risk management and insurance brokerage firm Marsh & McLennan Companies Inc has given Soames £518,069 since 2010 in remunerations for his services as an MP. Soames has also received private donations from a variety of people, including £5,749 from Majlis As Shura, £10,000 from David Rowland, and £20,000 from Ann R. Said.

== Meeting with Robert Mugabe ==
In October 2017, Soames met with President Robert Mugabe while visiting Zimbabwe, and was afterward criticised by Labour MP Kate Hoey. Zimbabwean media reported that the visit was "part of a private initiative of friends of Zimbabwe in the British establishment" to normalise relations between the two countries. Hoey, chair of the All-Party Parliamentary Group on Zimbabwe, said that Soames' visit "pander[ed] to the vanity of a wily and ruthless dictator. [...] You can't have a private visit which is then front page of the newspapers in Zimbabwe." In response, Soames maintained that he had met Mugabe in a personal capacity, rather than as a representative of Her Majesty's Government. He said that his father, Lord Soames, who had overseen Southern Rhodesia's transition to independence as Zimbabwe, would not have forgiven him if he had not tried to meet the President.

== Peerage ==
It was announced on 14 October 2022, that as part of the 2022 Political Honours, Soames would be appointed a life peer. On 28 October 2022, he was created Baron Soames of Fletching, of Fletching in the County of East Sussex.

== Personal life ==
=== Family ===
Soames has been married twice. On 4 June 1981, he married Catherine Weatherall (b. 1956) (sister of Percy Weatherall and Isobel, Countess of Strathmore and Kinghorne) at St Margaret's, Westminster. The Prince of Wales served as best man and the wedding was attended by the Queen Mother, Princess Margaret and Lady Diana Spencer. They had one son before divorcing in 1988:

- Arthur Harry David Soames (b. May 1985)

His second marriage was on 21 December 1993 to Serena Smith (a niece of the Duchess of Grafton and daughter of Sir John Smith). They have two children:

- Isabella Soames (b. 28 November 1996)
- Christopher Soames (b. 11 January 2001)

His brother, Rupert Soames, is the CEO of outsourcing company Serco.

=== Driving offences ===
On 15 May 2008, Soames pleaded guilty to riding a quad bike on a public road without motor insurance. Since he had several previous offences on his licence, he was disqualified from driving for two months, fined £200, and ordered to pay a £15 victim surcharge and costs of £35 by magistrates.

In 2012, he was disqualified from driving for a fortnight for speeding at 51 mph in a 30 mph residential area. Soames was also fined £666, plus £85 court costs and a £15 victim surcharge. According to The Argus, a Sussex paper, it was "the third time he has been caught flouting traffic laws in four years".

== Honours ==
- (United Kingdom) On 13 July 2011, Soames was sworn of the Privy Council. This gave him the honorific prefix "the Right Honourable" for life.
- (United Kingdom) He was knighted in the 2014 Birthday Honours for political service.

== Arms ==
Coat of arms of Nicholas Soames
Crest In front of a rising sun Proper upon a lure Gules feathered Argent fesswise a falcon belled Or. Escutcheon Gules a chevron Or between in chief two mallets erect of the second and in base two wings conjoined in lure Argent. Motto Vilius Virtutibus Aurum

Parliament of the United Kingdom
New constituency	Member of Parliament for Crawley; 1983–1997	Succeeded by Laura Moffatt
Preceded by Tim Renton	Member of Parliament for Mid Sussex; 1997–2019	Succeeded by Mims Davies
Political offices
Preceded by Jeremy Hanley	Minister of State for the Armed Forces; 1994–1997	Succeeded by John Reid
Preceded by Bernard Jenkin	Shadow Secretary of State for Defence; 2003–2005	Succeeded by The Marquess of Lothian
Orders of precedence in the United Kingdom
Preceded by The Lord Murray of Blidworth	Gentlemen; Baron Soames of Fletching	Followed by The Lord Leong
