= Henry Smith (British politician) =

British politician, born 1969

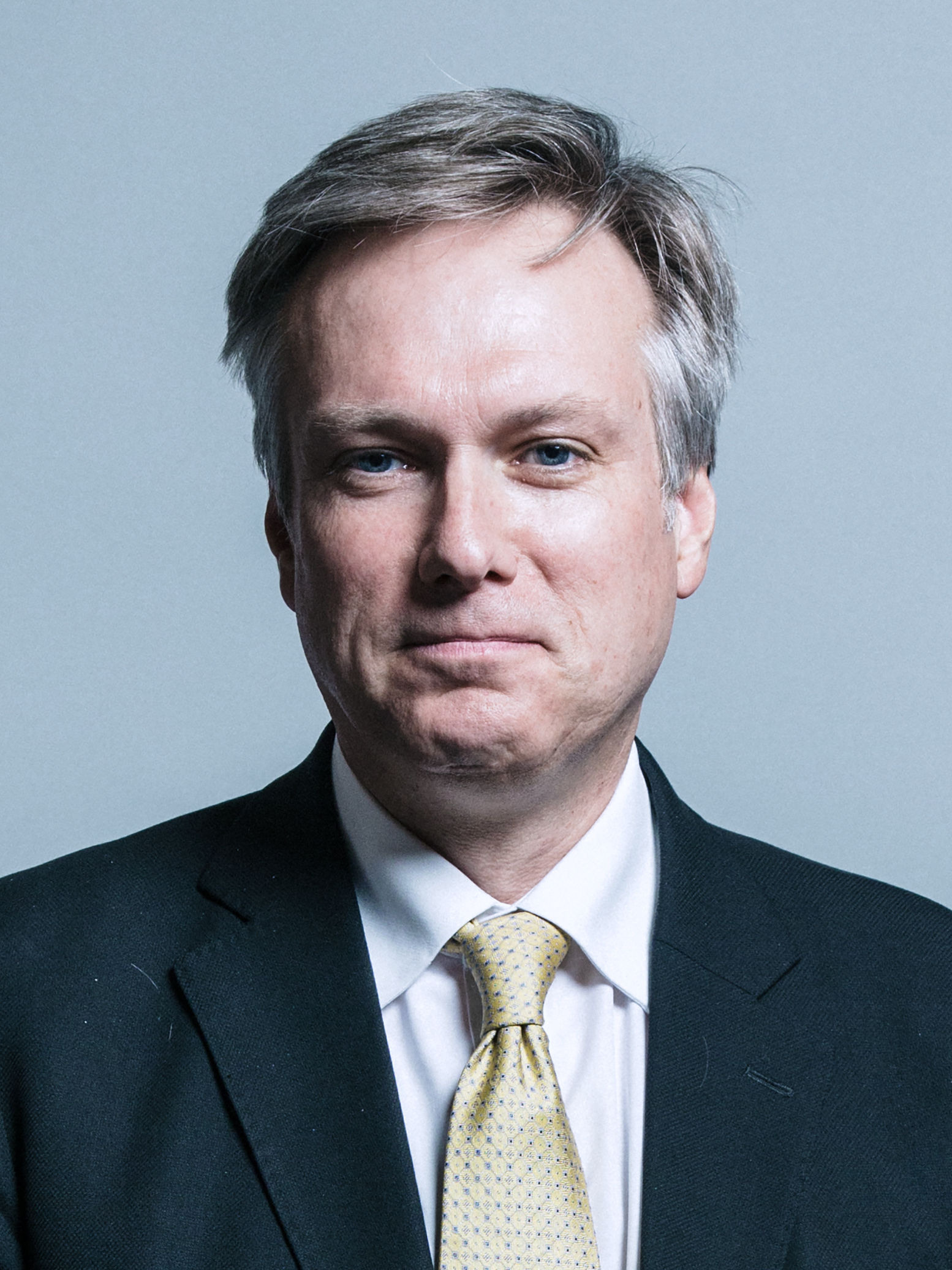
- Official portrait, 2017

Member of Parliament for Crawley
- In office 6 May 2010 – 30 May 2024
- Preceded by: Laura Moffatt
- Succeeded by: Peter Lamb

Leader of West Sussex County Council
- In office 2003 – 28 May 2010
- Preceded by: Harold Hall
- Succeeded by: Louise Goldsmith

West Sussex County Councillor for Maidenbower
- In office 1997–2010

Personal details
- Born: Henry Edward Millar Smith; 14 May 1969 (age 57) Epsom, Surrey, England
- Party: Reform UK (since 2025)
- Other political affiliations: Conservative (until 2025)
- Spouse: Jennifer Millar-Smith
- Children: 2
- Education: Chinthurst School; Frensham Heights School
- Alma mater: University College London (BA)
- Website: http://www.henrysmith.info/

Henry Edward Millar Smith (born 14 May 1969) is a British politician who was the Conservative Party Member of Parliament (MP) for Crawley from the 2010 general election until 2024. He was previously the Leader of West Sussex County Council from 2003 to 2010.

Smith joined Reform UK in September 2025, and was a party candidate for the 2026 East Surrey Council election.

== Education ==
Smith was born on 14 May 1969 in Epsom, Surrey. He was privately educated at Chinthurst School, Tadworth, Surrey – at the time a boys' preparatory school – then at Frensham Heights School, a co-educational independent school in Farnham in Surrey, followed by University College London, where he obtained a B.A. in Philosophy.

== Early career ==
Smith stood unsuccessfully as the Conservative candidate in the Pound Hill South ward of Crawley Borough Council in 1996. However, he was elected in 2002 as a Conservative Councillor for Pound Hill North Ward. He served until the next election in May 2006, when he did not stand again. Smith stood as the Conservative Party candidate for Furnace Green ward on West Sussex County Council and was elected in 1997, before being re-elected in the same ward in 2001 and then elected in Pound Hill Worth & Maidenbower ward in 2005 and 2009. He became Leader of the Council in 2003 at the age of 34, becoming the youngest county council leader in the country. At the time he also worked for a property investment business based in Crawley in West Sussex.

Smith was the chairman of the South East Counties Leaders Group (latterly South East Strategic Leaders) from 2007 to 2010, and has previously served as a Governor at The Oaks, The Brook, and Oriel High schools in Crawley. He co-wrote the 2005 publication Direct Democracy.

== Parliamentary career ==
Smith stood unsuccessfully as the Conservative candidate for Crawley at the general election in 2001 and 2005. He stood against the incumbent MP Laura Moffatt, the second time achieving the highest national swing from Labour to the Conservatives, reducing the majority to 37, the smallest in the country. He was subsequently elected to Parliament at the 2010 general election. Following his election as Crawley MP he resigned as a West Sussex County Councillor on 1 September 2010. He was then subsequently re-elected at the 2015 general election, 2017 general election and 2019 general election.

Gatwick Airport lies within his constituency and he has frequently spoken in favour of improved rail links to the airport and the reduction or abolition of Air Passenger Duty. On the airport's 2018 plans to expand and use its emergency runway for departure flights, Smith has said: "Crawley's prosperity depends on the success of Gatwick Airport and the publication of this new draft master plan goes a long way to securing future growth in the town. I have always supported the airport growing within its existing boundaries."

In the House of Commons he sat on the International Development Committee and Committees on Arms Export Controls (formerly Quadripartite Committee), the International Development Sub-Committee on the Work of the Independent Commission for Aid Impact and the International Development Committee. He previously sat on the European Scrutiny Committee.

In 2014, Smith said that getting a new hospital in the Pease Pottage area remained his "top issue" and was something he had raised in Parliament after constituents had criticised a lack of progress on the issue.

On 6 September 2013, while the St. Petersburg G20 Summit was ongoing, Smith referred to Russian president Vladimir Putin as a "tosser" on Twitter, following reports of an unnamed Russian official having described Britain as "small and unimportant." Smith subsequently said he stood by his comments, arguing that although it was "difficult to get a serious point across in 140 characters" the serious point was that Putin was an "absurd character who is responsible for some serious breaches of human rights".

In 2018, Smith hosted the launch of PAWS – the Policy for Animal Welfare. Created by Cher Chevalier and Judith Clegg, the policy suggests steps to improve and enforce Animal Welfare Law.

Having previously criticised the government's conduct of the Brexit negotiations, he submitted a letter of no confidence in the Conservative Party leader Theresa May on the day after publication of the draft withdrawal agreement between the UK and the EU.

In October 2019, Smith alleged that he had been targeted with threats and stalking, including threats against his children. Smith said that in one incident, his children's school was publicised on anarchist and left-wing websites.

In May 2020, Smith was criticised by several Labour MPs after he described MPs who objected to the end of the virtual parliament system during the COVID-19 pandemic as "lazy" and "work-shy socialists".

In June 2020, Smith suggested on Twitter that Karl Marx's grave marker should be removed and claimed Marx, who was born Jewish, was antisemitic. A number of scholars and commentators regard Marx and in particular his work On the Jewish Question, which addresses "The Capacity of Present-day Jews and Christians to Become Free", as antisemitic.

In November 2020, Smith was one of 30 Conservative and 6 other MPs voting against a second coronavirus lockdown in England. He also voted against renewing the Coronavirus Act in March 2021 and against a 4-week extension of the lockdown in June 2021. In a June 2021 interview, he highlighted the damaging effect on jobs in his constituency of government policy on travel restrictions.

In 2022, following a series of government scandals, he supported Boris Johnson's leadership until the resignations of Chancellor Rishi Sunak and Health Secretary Sajid Javid when he joined other Conservative MPs in calling for Johnson's resignation. After first supporting Suella Braverman and then Penny Mordaunt in the leadership race, he then voiced support for Liz Truss after they were eliminated. In a letter to the Telegraph with nine other Conservative MPs, Smith said: "We are all patriots and optimists, and we agree with Liz Truss's assessment that our country's best days are ahead of us. But this can only be true if we make it so, and that requires action." However, following the removal of Braverman as Home Secretary and a vote on fracking, in which he did not back the government's position, he became the eighth Conservative MP to publicly call for Truss's resignation.

Smith announced in March 2023 that he would stand down at the next general election.

== Political views ==
Smith's parliamentary candidacy at the 2015 general election was personally endorsed by Queen guitarist Brian May on the grounds of his animal welfare record. May had worked with him in opposing the government's badger culling. In parliament, Smith has also spoken against the export of live animals, the import of foie gras, the ivory trade, fur clothing and animals in circuses. He has spoken in favour of CCTV in slaughterhouses, the reduction of the use of animals in scientific experiments and for increased criminal penalties for animal cruelty. Smith also opposes trophy hunting and introduced a bill to ban it.

Smith has frequently spoken up for the rights of the expelled Chagos Islanders, many of whom live in his former constituency. In January 2018 he introduced the private members' British Indian Ocean Territory (Citizenship) Bill to enable the islanders and their descendants to claim British Overseas Territory citizenship. The Bill failed to complete its passage through Parliament before the end of the session, which meant it made no further progress. In 2022 he successfully tabled an amendment to the Nationality & Borders Bill which granted British Citizenship rights to the descendants of exiled Chagos Islanders.

Smith is a Eurosceptic who supported backbench calls for an early referendum on exiting the EU. He repeatedly denied rumours linking him to a possible defection to UKIP in 2014, insisting he supported the Conservatives' other policies and felt they were the best option for a referendum on the EU.

Smith opposed same-sex marriage.

== Personal life ==
Smith was married to Jennifer Millar-Smith. She worked in his parliamentary office and was elected as the councillor for Maidenbower on Crawley Borough Council between 2019 and 2024. She previously served as a councillor for the ward between 2004 and 2012. He has two children.

Parliament of the United Kingdom
Preceded by Laura Moffatt	Member of Parliament for Crawley; 2010–2024	Succeeded by Peter Lamb
