= Peter Hordern (politician) =

British politician (1929–2024)

The Right Honourable Sir Peter Hordern DL

Member of Parliament for Horsham (Horsham and Crawley, 1974—1983)
- In office 15 October 1964 – 8 April 1997
- Preceded by: Frederick Gough
- Succeeded by: Francis Maude

Personal details
- Born: Peter Maudslay Hordern; 18 April 1929
- Died: 18 April 2024 (aged 95)
- Party: Conservative

Sir Peter Maudslay Hordern, DL, PC (18 April 1929 – 18 April 2024) was a British Conservative Party politician.

== Early life ==
Hordern was born on 18 April 1929, and was the son of Captain Charles Hubert Hordern MBE and grandson of Rt. Rev. Hugh Maudslay Hordern (Bishop of Lewes). He was educated at Geelong Grammar School, Australia and Christ Church, Oxford. He served with the 60th Rifles from 1947 to 1949, joining the regiment of his father and great-uncle, Brig. General Gwyn Venables Hordern CB, CMG, JP. He then became a Member of the Stock Exchange.

== Political career ==
Hordern served as member of parliament for Horsham from 1964 to 1974, for Horsham and Crawley from 1974 to 1983 and for Horsham once again from 1983 to 1997. He was appointed to the Privy Council of the United Kingdom in 1993. He was appointed a deputy lieutenant for West Sussex.

Hordern was a member of the Public Accounts Committee from 1970 to 1987, Chairman of the Finance Committee from 1970 to 1972 and Chairman of the Public Accounts Commission from 1988 to 1997. He was appointed to the Executive of the 1922 Committee in 1967, later becoming Secretary of the 1922 Committee and Chairman of the Conservative backbench Committee on Europe.

Colin Welch described Hordern as "the ablest Tory never to have been a minister". Andrew Roth's Parliamentary Profiles (1987–1991) describes him as "Widely respected, well-connected, principled Rightwing, monetarist City gent; a hard-headed long term thinker; a devout believer in sanctity of tight money" and as saying "I was not only one of the first in this House to be a monetarist...I confidently expect to be about the last." Ahead of the high inflation of the mid-1970s, he attacked (with some prescience) the Bank of England in 1970 for insufficient monetary restraint and (while Chairman of the Finance Committee) both publicly opposed Chancellor Anthony Barber's over-expansion of monetary supply in April 1971 and attacked the Heath Government's "absurd" proposals for a statutory prices and incomes policy.

== Other work ==
Hordern was appointed a director of Petrofina UK PLC in 1973 and chairman in 1987. He was appointed a director of F&C Smaller Companies Investment Trust, plc in 1978, and as chairman in 1986. He was appointed a director of TR Technology Investment Trust in 1985 (formerly Atlas Electric and General Trust). In 1982 he was appointed a consultant to Fisons PLC and a consultant to House of Fraser PLC and Pannell Kerr Forster in 1984.

== Personal life and death ==
Hordern married Elizabeth Susan Chataway (sister of Sir Christopher Chataway) in 1964. They had two sons and one daughter: Andrew Charles Hugh Hordern (1965–2009); James Peter Hordern (born 1967); and Sara Victoria Margaret (born 1971).

Hordern died on 18 April 2024, his 95th birthday.

Parliament of the United Kingdom
Preceded by Frederick Gough	Member of Parliament for Horsham; 1964 – February 1974	Constituency abolished
New constituency	Member of Parliament for Horsham and Crawley; February 1974 – 1983	Constituency abolished
New constituency	Member of Parliament for Horsham; 1983–1997	Succeeded by Francis Maude
