= Laura Moffatt =

British politician

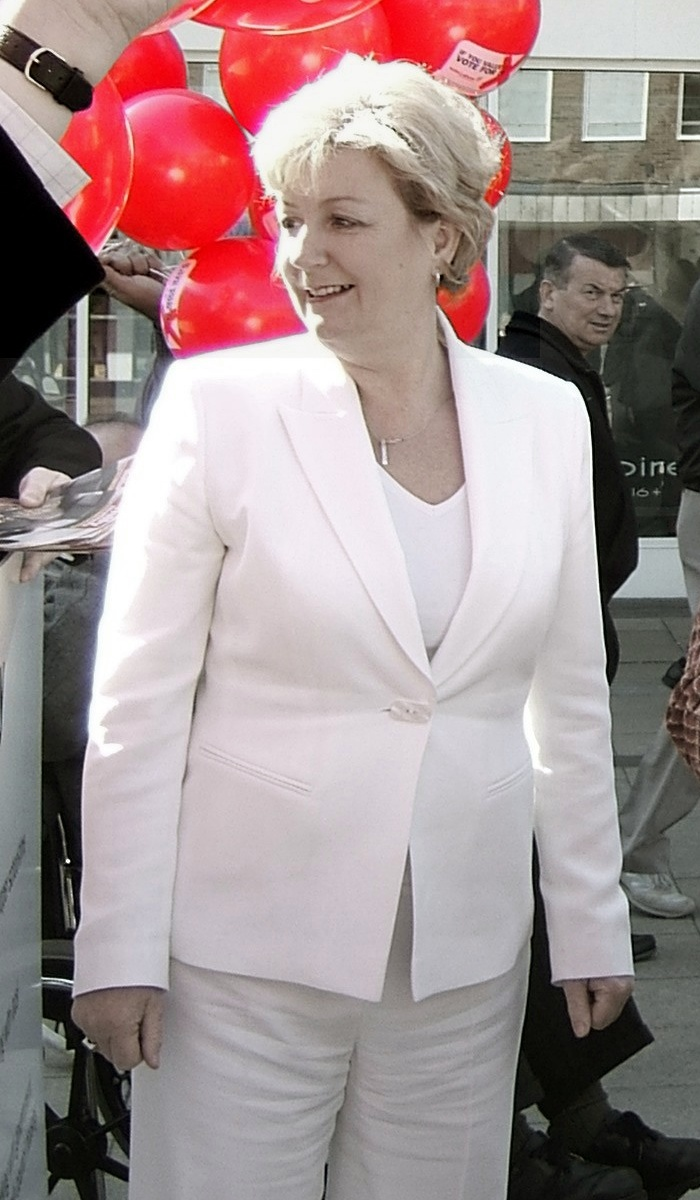
- Moffatt in 2006

Member of Parliament for Crawley
- In office 1 May 1997 – 12 April 2010
- Preceded by: Nicholas Soames
- Succeeded by: Henry Smith

Mayor of Crawley
- In office 1989–1990
- Preceded by: RG Rudd
- Succeeded by: BA Smith

Personal details
- Born: 9 April 1954 (age 72) Battersea, London, England
- Party: Labour
- Spouse: Colin Moffatt (m. 1975)
- Children: 3
- Education: Central Sussex College
- Occupation: Nurse, Politician

Laura Jean Moffatt (née Field; born 9 April 1954) is a British Labour Party politician who was the Member of Parliament (MP) for Crawley from 1997 until 2010.

== Early life ==
Born Laura Jean Field in Wandsworth, London in 1954, she came to Crawley new town with her parents in 1956. She was educated at Hazelwick School in Crawley, West Sussex before attending the Crawley College of Technology (now renamed Central Sussex College).

From 1975 until her election to the House of Commons in 1997, she worked as a state registered nurse at Crawley Hospital. She joined the Labour Party in 1979 and was elected to Crawley Borough Council in 1984, remaining as a councillor until 1997 and serving as the town's mayor in 1990.

== Parliamentary career ==
Moffatt stood in Crawley at the 1992 general election, but lost out to the sitting Conservative MP Nicholas Soames. For the following election she was again selected as the Labour candidate, though this time through an all-women shortlist and was successful in the 1997 and 2001 elections.

From 1997 to 2001 she served as a member of the Defence Select Committee. Following her re-election in 2001, Moffatt served as a Parliamentary Private Secretary (PPS) to the Lord Chancellor Derry Irvine (2001–03) and to the Secretary of State for Constitutional Affairs Charles Falconer (2003–05).

At the 2005 general election she was elected to the Commons on the smallest majority in the country with 37 votes, with her share of the vote falling by over 10 per cent from the 2001 general election result. After an epic count, and numerous re-counts, Moffatt broke down in tears after being returned to Parliament.

She served as (PPS) to the Secretary of State for Work and Pensions David Blunkett (2005); the Minister of State at the Department for Education and Skills Jacqui Smith (2005–06), and from 2006 served as the PPS to Alan Johnson initially as Secretary of State for Education and Skills and since 2007 as Secretary of State for Health.

On 15 March 2010, Moffatt announced her intention to stand down at the 2010 General Election because the job had taken a toll on her family life.

== Personal life ==
She married Colin Moffatt in 1975 in Crawley and they have three sons. She lives in the Broadfield area of the town.

In May 2009, Moffatt made the news during the MPs' expenses row for giving up her flat in London because she said that the "annual cost did not sit comfortably with me", in her blog she wrote: "I never travel first class when commuting and since getting rid of my flat I more often sleep on a camp bed in my office when the house sits late … and have only made one claim for personal goods in 2007/08, under £20, I think, to replace some towels."

Moffatt has said she has felt unsafe travelling late at night on trains as she has been the victim of a flasher on two occasions on a late night train. She has a tattoo on her left foot of a Labour rose with the number '37' in order to remind her of her slim majority in 2005.

Parliament of the United Kingdom
| Preceded by Nicholas Soames | Member of Parliament for Crawley; 1997–2010 | Succeeded by Henry Smith |
