= Endorsements in the 2024 Conservative Party leadership election =

This is a list of public endorsements for declared candidates for the 2024 leadership election for the Conservative Party of the United Kingdom.

== Members of Parliament ==
Each leadership candidate must have the endorsement of ten current Conservative MPs to make the ballot for the election. This includes one proposer and one seconder.

=== Kemi Badenoch ===
1. Gareth Bacon, MP for Orpington (2019–)
2. Harriett Baldwin, MP for West Worcestershire (2010–)
3. Steve Barclay, MP for North East Cambridgeshire (2010–)
4. Andrew Bowie, MP for West Aberdeenshire and Kincardine (2017–)
5. Alex Burghart, MP for Brentwood and Ongar (2017–)
6. James Cartlidge, MP for South Suffolk (2019–)
7. Claire Coutinho, MP for East Surrey (2019–)
8. Geoffrey Cox, MP for Torridge and Tavistock (2024–), Torridge and West Devon (2005–2024)
9. Mims Davies, MP for East Grinstead and Uckfield (2024–), Mid Sussex (2019–2024), Eastleigh (2015–2019) (previously endorsed Stride and Cleverly)
10. David Davis, MP for Goole and Pocklington (2024–), Haltemprice and Howden (1997–2024), Boothferry (1987-1997)
11. Iain Duncan Smith, MP for Chingford and Woodford Green (1997–), Chingford (1992–1997)
12. Helen Grant, MP for Maidstone and Malling (2024–), Maidstone and The Weald (2010–2024)
13. Andrew Griffith, MP for Arundel and South Downs (2019–)
14. Damian Hinds, MP for East Hampshire (2010–)
15. Kevin Hollinrake, MP for Thirsk and Malton (2015–)
16. Nigel Huddleston, MP for Droitwich and Evesham (2024–), Mid Worcestershire (2015–2024)
17. Bernard Jenkin, MP for Harwich and North Essex (2010–), North Essex (1997–2010), Colchester North (1992–1997)
18. Julia Lopez, MP for Hornchurch and Upminster (2017–)
19. Alan Mak, MP for Havant (2015–)
20. Andrew Mitchell, MP for Sutton Coldfield (2001–), Gedling (1987-1997) (previously endorsed Tugendhat)
21. Jesse Norman, MP for Hereford and South Herefordshire (2010–)
22. Ben Obese-Jecty, MP for Huntingdon (2024–)
23. Chris Philp, MP for Croydon South (2015–)
24. Julian Smith, MP for Skipton and Ripon (2010–)
25. Ben Spencer, MP for Runnymede and Weybridge (2019–)
26. Laura Trott, MP for Sevenoaks (2019–)
27. Helen Whately, MP for Faversham and Mid Kent (2015–)
28. Kieran Mullan, MP for Bexhill and Battle (2024–), Crewe and Nantwich (2019–2024)
29. Andrew Snowden, MP for Fylde (2024–) (previously endorsed Patel)

=== James Cleverly ===
1. Saqib Bhatti, MP for Meriden and Solihull East (2024–), Meriden (2019–2024)
2. Mims Davies, MP for East Grinstead and Uckfield (2024–), Mid Sussex (2019–2024), Eastleigh (2015–2019) (previously endorsed Stride, subsequently endorsed Badenoch)
3. Charlie Dewhirst, MP for Bridlington and The Wolds (2024–)
4. Peter Fortune, MP for Bromley and Biggin Hill (2024–)
5. Ashley Fox, MP for Bridgwater (2024–)
6. George Freeman, MP for Mid Norfolk (2010–) (previously endorsed Stride)
7. Simon Hoare, MP for North Dorset (2015–)
8. Gagan Mohindra, MP for South West Hertfordshire (2019–)
9. Shivani Raja, MP for Leicester East (2024–)
10. Alec Shelbrooke, MP for Wetherby and Easingwold (2024–), Elmet and Rothwell (2010–2024) (previously endorsed Patel)
11. Greg Smith, MP for Mid Buckinghamshire (2024–), Buckingham (2019–2024) (previously endorsed Patel)
12. Blake Stephenson, MP for Mid Bedfordshire (2024–)
13. Mel Stride, MP for Central Devon (2010–) (previous leadership candidate)
14. Paul Holmes, MP for Hamble Valley (2024–) and Eastleigh (2019–2024)
15. Alison Griffiths (politician) MP for Bognor Regis and Littlehampton (2024-)

=== Robert Jenrick ===
1. Edward Argar, MP for Melton and Syston (2024–) and Charnwood (2015–2024)
2. Victoria Atkins, MP for Louth and Horncastle (2015–)
3. Peter Bedford, MP for Mid Leicestershire (2024–)
4. Suella Braverman, MP for Fareham and Waterlooville (2024–), Fareham (2015–2024)
5. Christopher Chope, MP for Christchurch (1997–), Southampton Itchen (1983–1992)
6. Lewis Cocking, MP for Broxbourne (2024–)
7. John Cooper, MP for Dumfries and Galloway (2024–)
8. Gareth Davies, MP for Grantham and Bourne (2024–), Grantham and Stamford (2019–2024)
9. Mark Francois, MP for Rayleigh and Wickford (2001–)
10. John Hayes, MP for South Holland and The Deepings (1997–)
11. Richard Holden, MP for Basildon and Billericay (2024–), MP for North West Durham (2019–2024)
12. Caroline Johnson, MP for Sleaford and North Hykeham (2016–)
13. Danny Kruger, MP for East Wiltshire (2024–), Devizes (2019–2024)
14. Katie Lam, MP for Weald of Kent (2024–)
15. John Lamont, MP for Berwickshire, Roxburgh and Selkirk (2017–)
16. Edward Leigh, MP for Gainsborough (1997–), Gainsborough and Horncastle (1983–1997)
17. Esther McVey, MP for Tatton (2017–), Wirral West (2010–2015)
18. Wendy Morton, MP for Aldridge-Brownhills (2015–) (previously endorsed Patel)
19. Neil O'Brien, MP for Harborough, Oadby and Wigston (2017–)
20. Mark Pritchard, MP for The Wrekin (2005–)
21. Jack Rankin, MP for Windsor (2024–)
22. Andrew Rosindell, MP for Romford (2001–)
23. Desmond Swayne, MP for New Forest West (1997–) (previously endorsed Stride)
24. Bradley Thomas, MP for Bromsgrove (2024–)
25. Nick Timothy, MP for West Suffolk (2024–) (previously endorsed Tugendhat)
26. Matt Vickers, MP for Stockton West (2024–) and Stockton South (2019–2024)

=== Priti Patel ===
1. Saqib Bhatti, MP for Meriden and Solihull East (2024–), Meriden (2019–2024)
2. Wendy Morton, MP for Aldridge-Brownhills (2015–) (subsequently endorsed Jenrick)
3. Alec Shelbrooke, MP for Wetherby and Easingwold (2024–), Elmet and Rothwell (2010–2024) (subsequently endorsed Cleverly)
4. Greg Smith, MP for Mid Buckinghamshire (2024–), Buckingham (2019–2024) (subsequently endorsed Cleverly)
5. Andrew Snowden, MP for Fylde (2024–) (subsequently endorsed Badenoch)
6. John Whittingdale, MP for Maldon (2010–), Maldon and East Chelmsford (1997–2010), South Colchester and Maldon (1992–1997)

=== Mel Stride ===
1. Mims Davies, MP for East Grinstead and Uckfield (2024–), Mid Sussex (2019–2024), Eastleigh (2015–2019) (subsequently endorsed Cleverly then Badenoch)
2. George Freeman, MP for Mid Norfolk (2010–) (subsequently endorsed Cleverly)
3. Mark Garnier, MP for Wyre Forest (2010–)
4. Jerome Mayhew, MP for Broadland and Fakenham (2019–)
5. Andrew Murrison, MP for South West Wiltshire (2010–), Westbury (2001–2010)
6. David Reed, MP for Exmouth and Exeter East (2024–) (subsequently endorsed Tugendhat)
7. Desmond Swayne, MP for New Forest West (1997–) (subsequently endorsed Jenrick)

=== Tom Tugendhat ===
1. Sarah Bool, MP for South Northamptonshire (2024–)
2. Karen Bradley, MP for Staffordshire Moorlands (2010–)
3. Harriet Cross, MP for Gordon and Buchan (2024–)
4. Andrew Mitchell, MP for Sutton Coldfield (2001–), Gedling (1987-1997) (subsequently endorsed Badenoch)
5. Alicia Kearns, MP for Rutland and Stamford (2024–) and Rutland and Melton (2019–2024)
6. Caroline Nokes, MP for Romsey and Southampton North (2010–)
7. David Reed, MP for Exmouth and Exeter East (2024–) (previously endorsed Stride)
8. Neil Shastri-Hurst, MP for Solihull West and Shirley (2024–)
9. Patrick Spencer, MP for Central Suffolk and North Ipswich (2024–)
10. Nick Timothy, MP for West Suffolk (2024–) (subsequently endorsed Jenrick)
11. James Wild, MP for North West Norfolk (2019–)

== Former Members of Parliament ==
=== Kemi Badenoch ===
1. Steve Baker, former MP for Wycombe (2010–2024) (previously endorsed Tugendhat)
2. Nicholas Bennett, former MP for Pembrokeshire (1987–1992)
3. Felicity Buchan, former MP for Kensington (2019–2024)
4. Conor Burns, former MP for Bournemouth West (2010–2024)
5. Ben Bradley, former MP for Mansfield (2017–2024)
6. Anthony Browne, former MP for South Cambridgeshire (2019–2024)
7. Rob Butler, former MP for Aylesbury (2019–2024)
8. Lisa Cameron, former MP for East Kilbride, Strathaven and Lesmahagow (2015–2024)
9. Maria Caulfield, former MP for Lewes (2015–2024)
10. Colin Clark, former MP for Gordon (2017–2019)
11. Simon Clarke, former MP for Middlesbrough South and East Cleveland (2017–2024)
12. Theo Clarke, former MP for Stafford (2019–2024)
13. Chris Clarkson, former MP for Heywood and Middleton (2019–2024)
14. Damian Collins, former MP for Folkestone and Hythe (2010–2024) (previously endorsed Cleverly)
15. Therese Coffey, former MP for Suffolk Coastal (2010–2024)
16. Robert Courts, former MP for Witney (2016–2024)
17. Virginia Crosbie, former MP for Ynys Mon (2019–2024)
18. Edwina Currie, former MP for South Derbyshire (1983-1997)
19. David TC Davies, former MP for Monmouth (2005–2024)
20. James Davies, former MP for Vale of Clwyd (2015-2017, 2019-2024)
21. James Daly, former MP for Bury North (2019–2024)
22. Michelle Donelan, former MP for Chippenham (2015–2024)
23. Steve Double, former MP for St Austell and Newquay (2015–2024)
24. James Duddridge, former MP for Rochford and Southend East (2005–2024)
25. David Duguid, former MP for Banff and Buchan (2017–2024)
26. Mark Eastwood, former MP for Dewsbury (2019–2024)
27. David Evennett, former MP for Bexleyheath and Crayford (2005–2024), Erith and Crayford (1983–1997)
28. Vicky Ford, former MP for Chelmsford (2017–2024) (previously endorsed Cleverly)
29. David Gauke, former MP for South West Hertfordshire (2005–2019) (previously endorsed Stride, Tugendhat and Cleverly)
30. Luke Graham, former MP for Ochil and South Perthshire (2017–2019)
31. Damian Green, former MP for Ashford (1997–2024) (previously endorsed Tugendhat)
32. Dominic Grieve, former MP for Beaconsfield (1997-2019)
33. Greg Hands, former MP for Chelsea and Fulham (2010–2024), Hammersmith and Fulham (2005–2010)
34. Jerry Hayes, former MP for Harlow (1983–1997)
35. James Heappey, former MP for Wells (2015–2024) (previously endorsed Cleverly)
36. Bob Hughes, former MP for Harrow West (1987-1997)
37. Eddie Hughes, former MP for Walsall North (2017–2024)
38. Mark Jenkinson, former MP for Workington (2019–2024)
39. Daniel Kawczynski, former MP for Shrewsbury and Atcham (2005–2024)
40. Stephen Kerr, former MP for Stirling (2017–2019) (previously endorsed Tugendhat)
41. Julie Kirkbride, former MP for Bromsgrove (1997-2010)
42. Andrew Lewer, former MP for Northampton South (2017–2024)
43. Jack Lopresti, former MP for Filton and Bradley Stoke (2010–2024)
44. Tim Loughton, former MP for East Worthing and Shoreham (1997–2024)
45. Cherilyn Mackrory, former MP for Truro and Falmouth (2019–2024) (previously endorsed Cleverly)
46. Julie Marson, former MP for Hertford and Stortford (2019–2024)
47. Rachel Maclean, former MP for Redditch (2017–2024)
48. Bob Neill, former MP for Bromley and Chislehurst (2008–2024) (previously endorsed Cleverly)
49. George Osborne, former MP for Tatton (2001–2017)
50. Matthew Parris, former MP for West Derbyshire (1979–1986)
51. Tom Randall, former MP for Gedling (2019–2024)
52. Angela Richardson, former MP for Guildford (2019–2024)
53. Laurence Robertson, former MP for Tewkesbury (1997–2024)
54. Lee Rowley, former MP for North East Derbyshire (2017–2024)
55. Lee Scott, former MP for Ilford North (2005–2015)
56. Bob Seely, former MP for Isle of Wight (2017–2024)
57. Alexander Stafford, former MP for Rother Valley (2019–2024)
58. Ross Thomson, former MP for Aberdeen South (2017–2019)
59. Justin Tomlinson, former MP for Swindon North (2010–2024)
60. Steve Tuckwell, former MP for Uxbridge and South Ruislip (2023–2024)
61. Theresa Villiers, former MP for Chipping Barnet (2005-2024)

=== James Cleverly ===
1. Shaun Bailey, former MP for West Bromwich West (2019–2024)
2. Damian Collins, former MP for Folkestone and Hythe (2010–2024) (subsequently endorsed Badenoch)
3. James Davies, former MP for Vale of Clwyd (2015–2017; 2019–2024)
4. Simon Fell, former MP for Barrow and Furness (2019–2024)
5. Anna Firth, former MP for Southend West (2022–2024) (previously endorsed Patel)
6. Mark Fletcher, former MP for Bolsover (2019–2024)
7. Vicky Ford, former MP for Chelmsford (2017–2024) (subsequently endorsed Badenoch)
8. David Gauke, former MP for South West Hertfordshire (2005–2019) (previously endorsed Stride and Tugendhat, subsequently endorsed Badenoch)
9. James Heappey, former MP for Wells (2015–2024) (subsequently endorsed Badenoch)
10. Fay Jones, former MP for Brecon and Radnorshire (2019–2024)
11. Cherilyn Mackrory, former MP for Truro and Falmouth (2019–2024) (subsequently endorsed Badenoch)
12. Scott Mann, former MP for North Cornwall (2015–2024)
13. James Morris, former MP for Halesowen and Rowley Regis (2010–2024)
14. Sheryll Murray, former MP for South East Cornwall (2010–2024) (previously endorsed Patel)
15. Bob Neill, former MP for Bromley and Chislehurst (2006–2024) (subsequently endorsed Badenoch)
16. John Penrose, former MP for Weston-super-Mare (2005–2024)
17. Tom Pursglove, former MP for Corby (2015–2024) (previously endorsed Patel)
18. David Rutley, former MP for Macclesfield (2010–2024)
19. Grant Shapps, former MP for Welwyn Hatfield (2005–2024)
20. Andrew Stephenson, former MP for Pendle (2010–2024)
21. James Sunderland, former MP for Bracknell (2019–2024)
22. Michael Tomlinson, former MP for Mid Dorset and North Poole (2015–2024)
23. Giles Watling, former MP for Clacton (2017–2024)

=== Robert Jenrick ===
1. Sarah Atherton, former MP for Wrexham (2019–2024)
2. Simon Baynes, former MP for Clwyd South (2019–2024) (previously endorsed Patel)
3. Jack Brereton, former MP for Stoke-on-Trent South (2017–2024)
4. Bill Cash, former MP for Stone (1997–2024) and Stafford (1984–1997)
5. Miriam Cates, former MP for Penistone and Stocksbridge (2019–2024)
6. Brendan Clarke-Smith, former MP for Bassetlaw (2019–2024) (previously endorsed Patel)
7. Sarah Dines, former MP for Derbyshire Dales (2019–2024)
8. Jonathan Djanogly, former MP for Huntingdon (2001–2024)
9. Nadine Dorries, former MP for Mid Bedfordshire (2005–2023)
10. Ruth Edwards, former MP for Rushcliffe (2019–2024) (previously endorsed Stride)
11. Michael Fabricant, former MP for Lichfield (1997–2024), Mid Staffordshire (1992–1997)
12. James Grundy, former MP for Leigh (2019–2024)
13. Jonathan Gullis, former MP for Stoke-on-Trent North (2019–2024) (previously endorsed Patel)
14. Luke Hall, former MP for Thornbury and Yate (2015–2024)
15. Darren Henry, former MP for Broxtowe (2019–2024)
16. Antony Higginbotham, former MP for Burnley (2019–2024)
17. Jane Hunt, former MP for Loughborough (2019–2024)
18. Tom Hunt, former MP for Ipswich (2019–2024)
19. Ian Liddell-Grainger, former MP for Bridgwater and West Somerset (2010–2024), Bridgwater (2001–2010)
20. Marco Longhi, former MP for Dudley North (2019–2024)
21. Jill Mortimer, former MP for Hartlepool (2021–2024)
22. Amanda Solloway, former MP for Derby North (2019–2024 and 2015–2017)
23. Jacob Rees-Mogg, MP for North East Somerset (2010–2024)
24. Mark Spencer, former MP for Sherwood (2010–2024)
25. Jane Stevenson, former MP for Wolverhampton North East (2019–2024)
26. Bill Wiggin, former MP for North Herefordshire (2001–2024)
27. Nadhim Zahawi, former MP for Stratford-on-Avon (2010–2024)

=== Priti Patel ===
1. Simon Baynes, former MP for Clwyd South (2019–2024) (subsequently endorsed Jenrick)
2. Brendan Clarke-Smith, former MP for Bassetlaw (2019–2024) (subsequently endorsed Jenrick)
3. Michael Ellis, former MP for Northampton North (2010–2024)
4. Anna Firth, former MP for Southend West (2022–2024) (subsequently endorsed Cleverly)
5. Kevin Foster, former MP for Torbay (2015–2024)
6. Jonathan Gullis, former MP for Stoke-on-Trent North (2019–2024) (subsequently endorsed Jenrick)
7. Andrea Jenkyns, former MP for Morley and Outwood (2015–2024) (subsequently endorsed Jenrick)
8. Sheryl Murray, former MP for South East Cornwall (2010–2024) (subsequently endorsed Cleverly)
9. Tom Pursglove, former MP for Corby (2015–2024) (subsequently endorsed Cleverly)

=== Mel Stride ===
1. Ruth Edwards, former MP for Rushcliffe (2019–2024) (subsequently endorsed Jenrick)
2. David Gauke, former MP for South West Hertfordshire (2005–2019) (subsequently endorsed Tugendhat, Cleverly and Badenoch)
3. Robert Halfon, former MP for Harlow (2010–2024)
4. Peter Heaton-Jones, former MP for North Devon (2015–2019)
5. Gordon Henderson, former MP for Sittingbourne and Sheppey (2010–2024)
6. Pauline Latham, former MP for Mid Derbyshire (2010–2024)
7. Jack Lopresti, former MP for Filton and Bradley Stoke (2010–2024) (subsequently endorsed Badenoch)
8. Jonathan Lord, former MP for Woking (2010–2024)
9. Paul Maynard, former MP for Blackpool North and Cleveleys (2010–2024)

=== Tom Tugendhat ===
1. Steve Baker, former MP for Wycombe (2010–2024) (subsequently endorsed Badenoch)
2. Jake Berry, former MP for Rossendale and Darwen (2010–2024)
3. Sara Britcliffe, former MP for Hyndburn (2019–2024)
4. Jackie Doyle-Price, former MP for Thurrock (2010–2024)
5. Flick Drummond, former MP for Meon Valley (2019–2024), Portsmouth South (2015–2017)
6. David Gauke, former MP for South West Hertfordshire (2005–2019) (previously endorsed Stride, subsequently endorsed Cleverly and Badenoch)
7. Jo Gideon, former MP for Stoke-on-Trent Central (2019–2024)
8. Bill Grant, former MP for Ayr, Carrick and Cumnock (2017–2019)
9. Chris Green, former MP for Bolton West (2015–2024)
10. Damian Green, former MP for Ashford (1997–2024) (subsequently endorsed Badenoch)
11. Kirstene Hair, former MP for Angus (2017–2019)
12. Stephen Hammond, former MP for Wimbledon (2005–2024)
13. Kris Hopkins, former MP for Keighley (2010–2017)
14. Paul Howell, former MP for Sedgefield (2019–2024)
15. Margot James, former MP for Stourbridge (2010–2019)
16. Simon Jupp, former MP for East Devon (2019–2024)
17. Stephen Kerr, former MP for Stirling (2017–2019) (subsequently endorsed Badenoch)
18. Jessica Lee, former MP for Erewash (2010–2015)
19. David Lidington, former MP for Aylesbury (1992-2019)
20. David Morris, former MP for Morecambe and Lunesdale (2010–2024)
21. Stephen O'Brien, former MP for Eddisbury (1999–2015)
22. Mark Pawsey, former MP for Rugby (2010–2024)
23. Malcolm Rifkind, former MP for Kensington (2005–2015), Edinburgh Pentlands (1974-1997)
24. Mary Robinson, former MP for Cheadle (2015–2024)
25. Amber Rudd, former MP for Hastings and Rye (2010–2019)
26. John Stevenson, former MP for Carlisle (2010–2024)
27. Bob Stewart, former MP for Beckenham (2010–2024)
28. Anne-Marie Trevelyan, former MP for Berwick-upon-Tweed (2015–2024)

== Members of Devolved Parliaments ==
=== Kemi Badenoch ===
1. Miles Briggs, MSP for Lothian
2. Murdo Fraser, former deputy leader of the Scottish Conservatives, MSP for Mid Scotland and Fife
3. Rachael Hamilton, deputy leader of the Scottish Conservatives, MSP for Ettrick, Roxburgh and Berwickshire
4. Stephen Kerr, MSP for Central Scotland (previously endorsed Tugendhat)
5. Tess White, MSP for North East Scotland (previously endorsed Tugendhat)

=== Tom Tugendhat ===
1. Jackson Carlaw, former leader of the Scottish Conservatives (2020) and MSP for Eastwood
2. Finlay Carson, MSP for Galloway and West Dumfries
3. Tim Eagle, MSP for Highlands and Islands
4. Maurice Golden, MSP for North East Scotland
5. Sandesh Gulhane, MSP for Glasgow
6. Jamie Halcro Johnston, MSP for Highlands and Islands
7. Roz McCall, MSP for Mid Scotland and Fife
8. Liam Kerr, MSP for North East Scotland
9. Stephen Kerr, MSP for Central Scotland (subsequently endorsed Badenoch)
10. Douglas Lumsden, MSP for North East Scotland
11. Liz Smith, MSP for Mid Scotland and Fife
12. Alexander Stewart, MSP for Mid Scotland and Fife
13. Tess White, MSP for North East Scotland (subsequently endorsed Badenoch)
14. Brian Whittle, MSP for South Scotland

=== James Cleverly ===
1. Peter Fox, MS for Monmouth

=== Robert Jenrick ===
1. Andrew RT Davies, MS for South Wales Central
2. James Evans, MS for Brecon and Radnorshire

== Peers ==
=== Kemi Badenoch ===
1. Theodore Agnew, Baron Agnew
2. James Arbuthnot, Baron Arbuthnot of Edrom
3. Michael Ashcroft, Baron Ashcroft
4. John Attlee, 3rd Earl Attlee
5. Shaun Bailey, Baron Bailey of Paddington
6. Richard Balfe, Baron Balfe
7. Diana Barran, Baroness Barran
8. Nicola Blackwood, Baron Blackwood of North Oxford
9. David Maclean, Baron Blencathra
10. Olivia Bloomfield, Baroness Bloomfield of Hinton Waldrist
11. Nick Bourne, Baron Bourne of Aberystwyth
12. Virginia Bottomley, Baroness Bottomley of Nettlestone
13. Graham Brady, Baron Brady of Altrincham
14. David Brownlow, Baron Brownlow of Shurlock Row
15. Peta Buscombe, Baroness Buscombe
16. William Stonor, 8th Baron Camoys
17. Jonathan Berry, 5th Viscount Camrose
18. Kenneth Clarke, Baron Clarke of Nottingham (previously endorsed Tugendhat)
19. Byron Davies, Baron Davies
20. Michael Dobbs, Baron Dobbs
21. Ian Duncan, Baron Duncan
22. Andrew Dunlop, Baron Dunlop
23. Graham Evans, Baron Evans of Rainow
24. Natalie Evans, Baroness Evans of Bowes Park
25. Michael Farmer, Baron Farmer
26. Simone Finn, Baroness Finn
27. Daniel Finkelstein, Baron Finkelstein
28. Janet Fookes, Baroness Fookes
29. Michael Forsyth, Baron Forsyth of Drumlean (previously endorsed Tugendhat)
30. Jacqueline Foster, Baroness Foster of Oxton
31. Lorraine Fullbrook, Baroness Fullbrook
32. Gerry Grimstone, Baron Grimstone of Boscobel
33. William Hague, Baron Hague of Richmond
34. Archie Hamilton, Baron Hamilton of Epsom
35. Robin Hodgson, Baron Hodgson
36. Fiona Hodgson, Baroness Hodgson
37. James Jamieson, Baron Jamieson
38. Anne Jenkin, Baroness Jenkin of Kennington
39. Dominic Johnson, Baron Johnson of Lainston
40. Francis Maude, Baron Maude of Horsham
41. Mark McInnes, Baron McInnes of Kilwinning
42. Patrick McLoughlin, Baron McLoughlin (previously endorsed Stride)
43. Neil Mendoza, Baron Mendoza
44. Catherine Meyer, Baroness Meyer
45. Rosa Monckton, Baroness Monckton of Dallington Forest
46. Patricia Morris, Baroness Morris of Bolton
47. John Nash, Baron Nash
48. Pauline Neville-Jones, Baroness Neville-Jones
49. Emma Nicholson, Baroness Nicholson of Winterbourne
50. Timothy Elliot-Murray-Kynynmound, 7th Earl of Minto
51. Charles Moore, Baron Moore of Etchingham (non-affiliated)
52. Helena Morrissey, Baroness Morrissey
53. Norman Lamont, Baron Lamont of Lerwick
54. Andrew Lansley, Baron Lansley
55. Peter Lilley, Baron Lilley
56. Malcolm Offord, Baron Offord of Garvel
57. Stephen Parkinson, Baron Parkinson of Whitley Bay
58. Franck Petitgas, Baron Petitgas
59. Kulveer Ranger, Baron Ranger of Northwood
60. Matthew Ridley, Viscount Ridley
61. Andrew Roberts, Baron Roberts of Belgravia
62. Elizabeth Sanderson, Baroness Sanderson of Welton
63. Joan Seccombe, Baroness Seccombe
64. Deborah Stedman-Scott, Baroness Stedman-Scott
65. Tina Stowell, Baroness Stowell of Beeston
66. Tony Sewell, Baron Sewell of Sanderstead
67. Nicholas Soames, Baron Soames of Fletching
68. Christopher Tugendhat, Baron Tugendhat
69. Sandip Verma, Baroness Verma
70. David Willetts, Baron Willetts

=== James Cleverly ===
1. Ruth Davidson, Baroness Davidson of Lundin Links

=== Robert Jenrick ===
1. Henry Bellingham, Baron Bellingham
2. David Frost, Baron Frost
3. Stephen Greenhalgh, Baron Greenhalgh
4. Daniel Hannan, Baron Hannan of Kingsclere
5. Stewart Jackson, Baron Jackson of Peterborough
6. Daniel Moylan, Baron Moylan
7. Simon Murray, Baron Murray of Blidworth

=== Mel Stride ===
1. Patrick McLoughlin, Baron McLoughlin (subsequently endorsed Badenoch)

=== Tom Tugendhat ===
1. Kenneth Clarke, Baron Clarke of Nottingham (subsequently endorsed Badenoch)
2. Michael Forsyth, Baron Forsyth of Drumlean (subsequently endorsed Badenoch)
3. Richard Harrington, Baron Harrington of Watford

== Other politicians and individuals ==
=== Kemi Badenoch ===
1. Matthew Barber, PCC for Thames Valley
2. Nigel Biggar, historian and theologian
3. Duwayne Brooks, former councillor, political activist and close friend of Stephen Lawrence
4. Joanne Cash, businesswoman and 2010 general election candidate, Westminster North
5. Nikki da Costa, former director of legislative affairs to Theresa May and Boris Johnson
6. Sharron Davies, Olympic swimmer, athlete and activist
7. Roger Evans, former Deputy Mayor of London
8. Niall Ferguson, historian
9. John Gray, writer and philosopher
10. Susan Hall, London Assembly member and 2024 Conservative candidate for Mayor of London
11. Simon Heffer, historian and journalist
12. Dominic Lawson, journalist and writer
13. Iain Martin, journalist
14. Jo-Anne Nadler, former Conservative adviser and journalist
15. Robert Tombs, historian and writer
16. Lisa Townsend, PCC for Surrey
17. Thomas Turrell, London Assembly Member for Bexley and Bromley
18. Sarah Vine, journalist and writer
19. Toby Young, journalist and writer

=== James Cleverly ===
1. William Sitwell, British columnist (The Daily Telegraph) and restaurant critic
2. Alan Donnelly, former Lord Provost Depute of Aberdeen

=== Robert Jenrick ===
1. David Campbell Bannerman, former MEP for East of England (2009–2019)
2. John Hall, Conservative donor and property developer in North East England
3. Mark Littlewood, former director of the IEA
4. Max McGiffen, Director of Conservative Friends of the Overseas Territories
5. Tim Montgomerie, Conservative activist, creator of ConservativeHome and co-founder of the Centre for Social Justice think tank (previously endorsed Tugendhat)
6. Ed West, writer and journalist

=== Priti Patel ===
1. Alison Hernandez, PCC for Devon and Cornwall
2. Rupert Matthews, PCC For Leicestershire and Rutland (subsequently endorsed Jenrick)

=== Tom Tugendhat ===
1. Tim Montgomerie, Conservative activist, creator of ConservativeHome and co-founder of the Centre for Social Justice think tank (subsequently endorsed Jenrick)
2. Shane Painter, National Secretary of Scottish Young Conservatives
3. Matthew Scott, PCC for Kent
4. Andy Street, former Mayor of the West Midlands

== International politicians ==
=== Kemi Badenoch ===
1. Tony Abbott, Prime Minister of Australia (2013–2015)
2. Ron DeSantis, Governor of Florida (2019–)
