= Jo-Anne Nadler =

British journalist, writer, political commentator and politician

Jo-Anne Nadler is a British journalist, writer, political commentator and former Conservative Party politician.

== Journalism ==
Nadler became the first female producer that Radio 1 had recruited externally; she went on to produce The Radio 1 Chart Show and various other shows. However, in 1992 she took a post at Conservative Central Office as a senior press officer in the run up to that year's general election. She had been a Young Conservative during her teens, motivated to become politically active by her father's history as a childhood refugee escaping Nazism, and welcomed the job move as a way of re-establishing her political expertise.

She returned to the BBC two years later to work as a political producer; initially, this was at a regional level on the magazine programme Around Westminster, but eventually she was offered a post with the broadcaster's Sunday lunchtime political flagship, On the Record (presented first by Jonathan Dimbleby, then by John Humphrys), where she was both producer and reporter. Nadler became a freelance journalist following the Conservatives' landslide defeat at the 1997 general election. With New Labour in power, she set about researching a book about the likely next leader of the Conservative Party. When confirmed as leader, William Hague agreed to cooperate with the project, although she retained editorial independence. The biography, William Hague: In his own Right, was published by Politicos in 2000.

Her second book, Too Nice to be a Tory: Its my party and I'll cry if I want to, was published by Simon & Schuster in 2005. It used the structure of a personal memoir to tell the wider story of the changing fate of the Conservative Party in the years since 1979. The book was well reviewed, and brought her further work as a political commentator and author who makes regular appearances on radio and television, as well as writing for various newspapers and magazines.

She has appeared on programmes as diverse as BBC One's Question Time, Channel 5's The Wright Stuff and BBC Radio 4's Any Questions. Written contributions include articles for The Guardian, The Scotsman and The Spectator.

She has since combined political commentary with campaigning roles, both professionally in various political communications roles, and pro-bono on issues about which she feels strongly. She has written for various think tanks, including the Centre for Social Justice, where she collaborated with Sajid Javid on a report and commission looking into measures to combat child sexual exploitation. Following the summer of 2020, she became involved with the grassroots campaign group Don't Divide Us to make the case for colour-blind antiracism, and has since written extensively about ideological indoctrination in British schools, particularly for Civitas.

== Political career ==
On 6 May 2010, Nadler was elected to Wandsworth Borough Council as a representative of the Conservative Party. She served one term, majoring on schools and licensing, but stood down in 2014 to concentrate on her young family.

== Bibliography ==
- William Hague: In his own Right (2000)
- Too Nice to be a Tory: It's My Party and I'll Cry If I Want to (2004)
- The Honourable Ladies' Profiles of Women MPs 1918-1996 (contributor) 2018
- British Conservative Leaders (contributor) 2015
- Unsafe Children: Driving up our country's response to child sexual abuse and exploitation CSJ 2021
- Show, Tell and Leave nothing to the Imagination: How Critical Social Justice is undermining British Schooling Civitas 2023
