= Bob Symes =

Austrian television presenter in the UK (1924–2015)

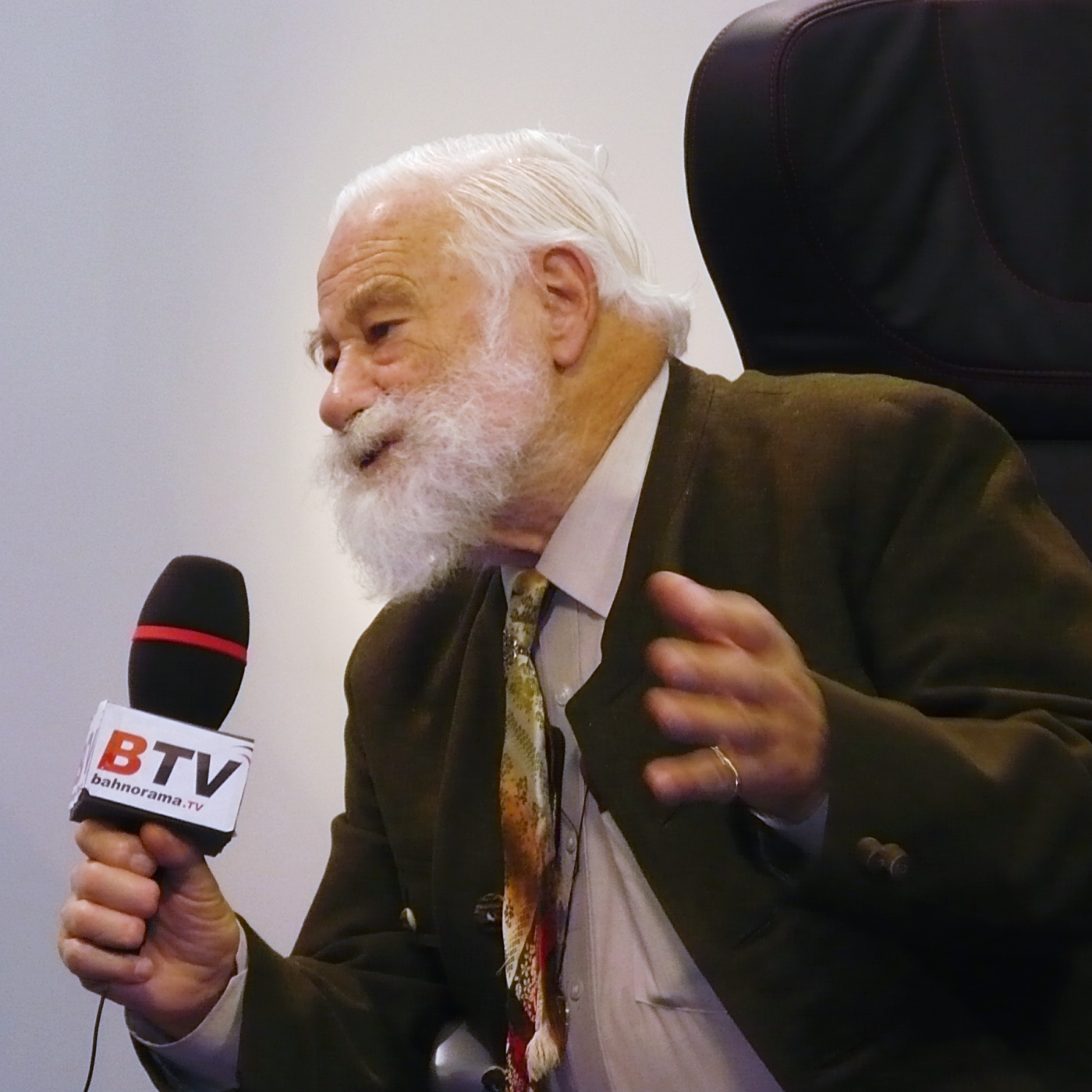
- Bob Symes Vienna 2008
- Born: Robert Alexander Schutzmann; 6 May 1924; Vienna, Austria
- Died: 19 January 2015 (aged 90); Wales, U.K.
- Other names: Robert Symes-Shutzmann, Bob Symes-Shutzmann
- Occupations: inventor and television presenter

Robert Alexander Schutzmann (6 May 1924 – 19 January 2015) was an Austrian inventor and television presenter. He was also known as Bob Symes, and sometimes credited as Robert Symes-Shutzmann or Bob Symes-Shutzmann.

== Early life ==
Bob Symes, who came from a Jewish family, was the son of Dr. Herbert Schutzmann, a lawyer and ardent Zionist, and his mother was writer Lola Blonder. Educated at a Realgymnasium, Vienna and the Institut auf dem Rosenberg in St. Gallen, Switzerland, during holidays he would return to the family estate where he developed a private narrow gauge railway that transported timber.

== Career ==
=== Royal Navy ===
After the death of his father in 1937, and the annexation of Austria by Nazi Germany in March 1938 via the Anschluss, his mother led Bob Symes and his younger sister to Trieste and onwards to the Jewish-section of Palestine. Whilst his mother and sister travelled onwards to the United States of America, Bob Symes contacted a former British diplomat in Vienna, a family friend who was once stationed in Cairo.

After gaining the required letter of recommendation, due to his ability to speak German, French, Arabic and English, Bob Symes was commissioned as a Lieutenant into the Royal Navy, operating Motor Torpedo Boats (MTBs) in the Mediterranean while based in Alexandria. Quickly rising to command his own boat, he broke anti-torpedo measures in a raid on Tripoli. After rising to the rank of Lieutenant Commander, he took part in protecting the landings that led to the liberation of Crete.

=== Broadcasting ===
After leaving the Royal Navy, he became the Dutch airline KLM's press officer in London.

In 1953, he joined the BBC's Overseas Service for Germany based in Broadcasting House, London, where his ability to speak various languages quickly established his career. After two years as head of broadcasting at the BBC's Eastern Region Colonial Office in Nigeria from 1956, he returned as a producer and broadcast manager to London.

His interest in engineering and technology resulted in his joining the Tomorrow's World presentation team, alongside Raymond Baxter. Over the following 30 years Bob Symes became a familiar face to British TV audiences across a number of engineering, technology and railway related productions, including Model World (in 1975) which was dedicated to the hobby of modelling, and then co-presented with Mary-Jean Hasler Making Tracks a series dedicated to little-known rail lines and networks worldwide, and which specialised in steam operations.

In 1982, he presented the BBC Horizon programme; "The Mysterious Mr. Tesla" about the electrical engineer Nikola Tesla.

Environmental techniques that Bob Symes had developed for environmental living resulted in the 1990s series The House that Bob Built, in which a "green" dwelling was constructed at Milton Keynes.

Bob Symes was a familiar face with the German-speaking audiences, through his presentation of the Bahnorama railway films, based around German, Austrian, Swiss and occasionally re-dubbed British railway footage, produced by the Austrian-based SH-Production & Co KEG company which he co-founded.

== Other interests ==
Until its closure on Easter Monday 2014, he was patron of the 'Hospital Radio Lion' based at the Royal Surrey County Hospital in Guildford.

=== Engineering and inventing ===
Bob Symes created inventions in metal engineering, and held patents in plumbing. He was also instrumental in setting up the Institute of Patentees and Inventors in 1989, which he chaired twice, and then he launched National Invent-A-Thing Week in 1992.

His books on the subject included: Powered Flight (1958); Crikey! It Works (1992); The Young Engineer’s Handbook (1993); and Eureka! The Book of Inventing (1994, with Robin Bootle).

=== Railways ===
His life-long interest in railways included helping to set up private railways in Switzerland and across the United Kingdom. He established the Border Union Railway Company Ltd. in 1969, to restore, maintain and introduce new services along the recently abandoned Waverley Line between Edinburgh and Carlisle.

His interest in model railways included a 300 metres (980 ft) long Gauge 1 railway in his garden at Honeysuckle Bottom, near East Horsley, Surrey, followed by a 10 1/4 railway. His family opened the railway every year to raise funds for the BBC's Children in Need, where visitors could take tea and cake and also see his collection of vintage tractors. Bob Symes was also the president of a Guildford-based model railway circle called Astolat MRC.

=== Politics ===
Bob Symes twice stood unsuccessfully for Parliament in Mid Sussex as a Liberal candidate in February and October 1974. He was later selected by the Conservatives as a European parliamentary candidate.

== Awards ==
Bob Symes held the Special Constabulary Long Service Medal as a Special Constable. He was made a companion of the Royal Aeronautical Society, and awarded the Knight's Cross (first class) by the President of Austria, in recognition of his work in promoting Anglo-Austrian relations.

== Personal life ==
In 1947, he visited the BBC to seek out Monica Chapman, who produced the military request programme Forces Prom to thank her for playing the choices that he had submitted. Chapman's mother gave to Symes her own ticket to a Beethoven concert that she was to attend that evening with her daughter, who subsequently married Bob six weeks later. The couple agreed on the surname Symes for their married life together. Monica later became Producer of the BBC Radio 4 programmes Desert Island Discs and Your Concert Choice, and the couple had a daughter Roberta.

Monica died in 1998. In January 2007, he married Sheila Gunn, then Works Manager at Boston Lodge, on the Ffestiniog Railway. Bob Symes and his family moved from East Horsley, where he had spent many years, to Wales in August 2014. He died there of cancer on 19 January 2015.
