= Alison Bennett =

British politician

Alison Bennett MP
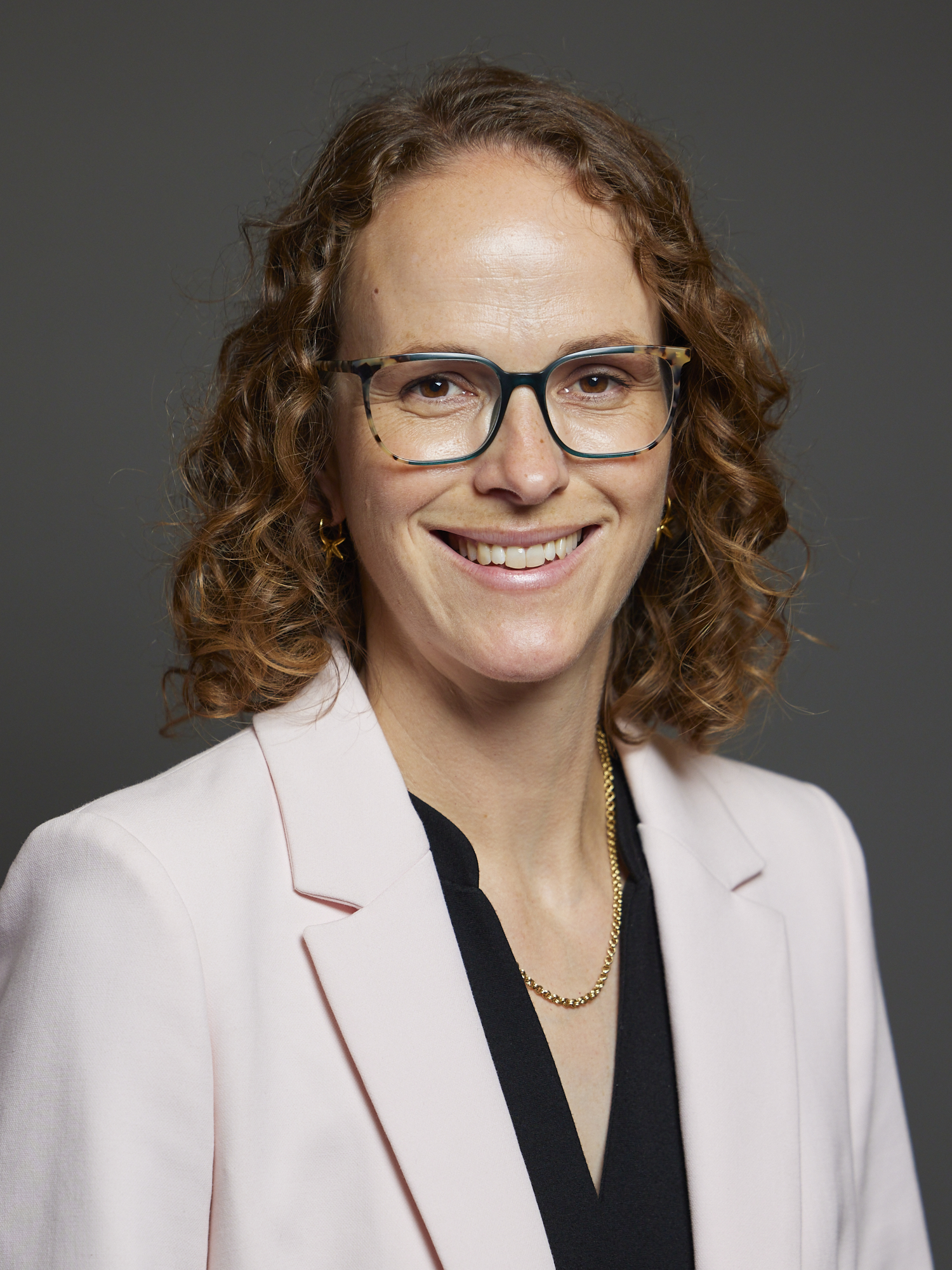
- Official portrait, 2024

Member of Parliament for Mid Sussex
- Incumbent
- Assumed office 4 July 2024
- Preceded by: Mims Davies
- Majority: 6,662 (12.5%)

Liberal Democrat spokesperson for Care and Carers
- In office 18 September 2024 – 5 October 2026
- Leader: Ed Davey
- Succeeded by: Clive Jones

Member of Mid Sussex District Council for Hurstpierpoint Hurstpierpoint and Downs (2019–2023)
- In office 6 May 2019 – 7 May 2026

Personal details
- Party: Liberal Democrats
- Education: University of Cambridge

Alison Elizabeth Bennett is a British Liberal Democrat politician who has served as Member of Parliament (MP) for Mid Sussex since 2024.

== Education and career ==
Bennett was privately educated at The King's School, Gloucester, and Newnham College, Cambridge, graduating in 1999 with a degree in social and political sciences. Bennett worked for British Airways and then E.ON.

== Political career ==
Bennett contested Arundel and South Downs for the Liberal Democrats at the 2019 general election, coming second to the Conservative candidate Andrew Griffith.

She served as a member of Mid Sussex District Council, representing the wards of Hurstpierpoint and Downs from 2019 to 2023 and Hurstpierpoint from 2023. Bennett was the council's deputy leader when she was selected to stand in the 2024 general election.

In the 2024 General Election, she was elected as Member of Parliament (MP) for Mid Sussex with 39.6% of the vote, becoming the first Liberal Democrat MP for the constituency since its creation in 1974.

Bennett was appointed the Liberal Democrat spokesperson for care and carers in September 2024. In the role, Bennett campaigned for better support for unpaid carers in the UK. In October 2026, Bennett resigned her post, amid criticism of Ed Davey’s leadership. However Bennett did not publish her reasons for stepping down.

Parliament of the United Kingdom
Preceded by Mims Davies	Member of Parliament for Mid Sussex; 2024–present	Incumbent
