= Mims Davies =

British politician (born 1975)

Mims Davies MP
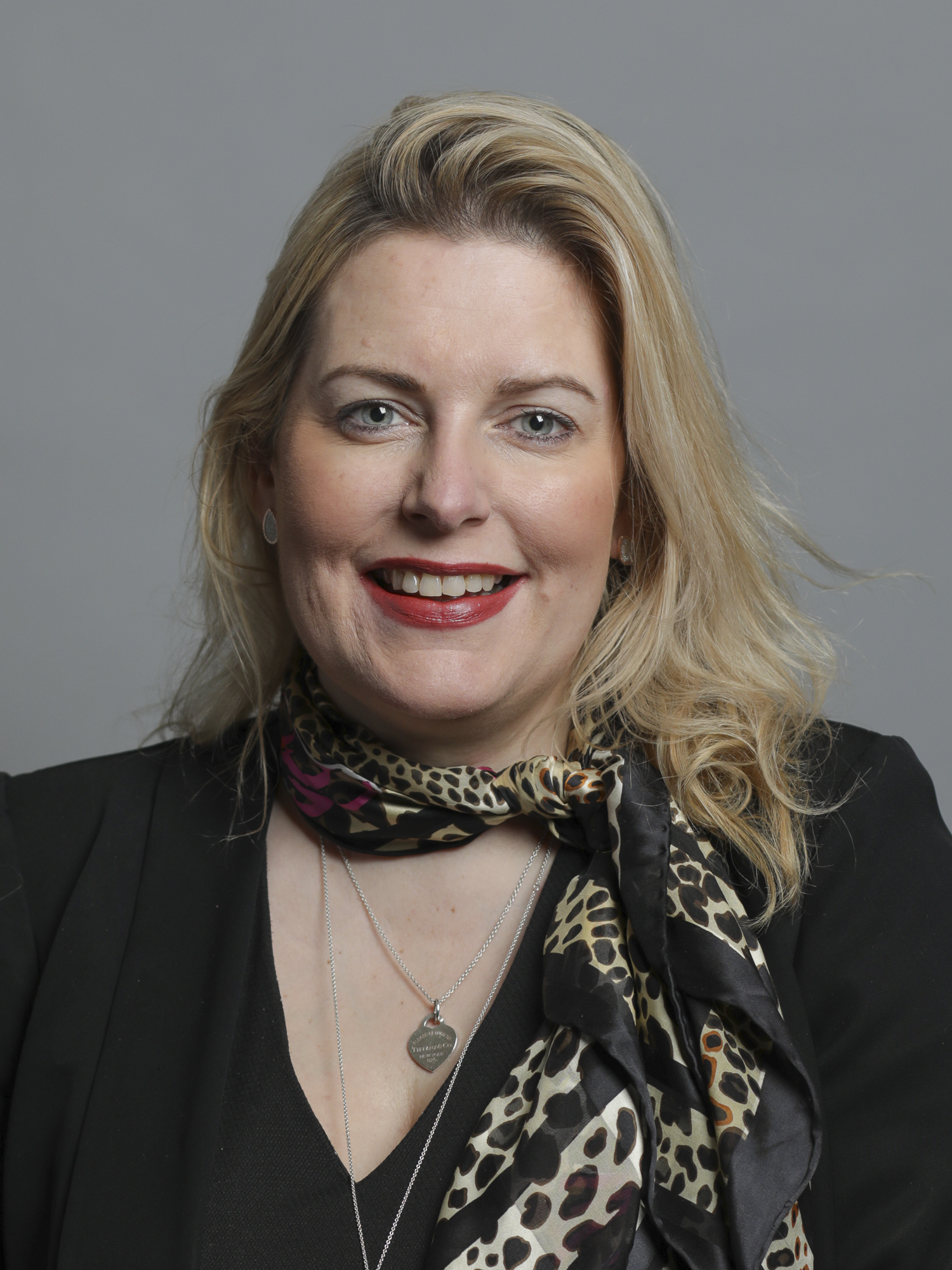
- Official portrait, 2019

Shadow Secretary of State for Wales
- Incumbent
- Assumed office 5 November 2024
- Leader: Kemi Badenoch
- Preceded by: Baron Davies of Gower

Shadow Minister for Women (Note: As Shadow Minister for Women and Equalities from 8 July 2024 to 5 November 2024)
- In office 8 July 2024 – 31 August 2026 Serving with Claire Coutinho from 6 November 2024
- Leader: Rishi Sunak; Kemi Badenoch
- Preceded by: Anneliese Dodds
- Succeeded by: Joy Morrissey
Junior ministerial offices
Minister of State for Disabled People, Health and Work (Note: As Parliamentary Under-Secretary of State from 14 December 2023 to 12 April 2024)
In office 14 December 2023 – 5 July 2024
Prime Minister	Rishi Sunak
Preceded by	Tom Pursglove
Succeeded by	Stephen Timms
Parliamentary Under-Secretary of State for Safeguarding
In office 27 October 2022 – 14 December 2023
Prime Minister	Rishi Sunak
Preceded by	Office established
Succeeded by	Office abolished
In office 20 September 2022 – 27 October 2022
Prime Minister	Liz Truss
Preceded by	Amanda Solloway
Succeeded by	Sarah Dines
Parliamentary Under-Secretary of State for Employment
In office 25 July 2019 – 6 July 2022
Prime Minister	Boris Johnson
Preceded by	Alok Sharma
Succeeded by	Julie Marson
Parliamentary Under-Secretary of State for Sport, Civil Society and Loneliness
In office 5 November 2018 – 25 July 2019
Prime Minister	Theresa May
Preceded by	Tracey Crouch
Succeeded by	Nigel Adams (Note: Adams succeeded Davies as Minister of State for Sport, Media and Creative Industries and The Baroness Barran succeeded Davies as Parliamentary Under-Secretary of State for Civil Society and Loneliness.)
Parliamentary Under-Secretary of State for Wales
In office 26 July 2018 – 5 November 2018
Prime Minister	Theresa May
Preceded by	Stuart Andrew
Succeeded by	Nigel Adams

Member of Parliament
- Incumbent
- Assumed office 7 May 2015
- Preceded by: Mike Thornton
- Constituency: Eastleigh (2015–2019); Mid Sussex (2019–2024); East Grinstead and Uckfield (2024–present)
- Majority: 8,480 (16.8%)

Personal details
- Born: Miriam Jane Alice Davies; 2 June 1975 (age 51)
- Party: Conservative
- Spouse: Mark Davies (m. 2000)
- Children: 2
- Education: Swansea University (BA)
- Website: Official website

Miriam Jane Alice Davies (born 2 June 1975), known as Mims Davies, is a British Conservative Party politician who has served as the Member of Parliament (MP) for East Grinstead and Uckfield since 2024. She previously served as MP for Eastleigh from 2015 to 2019 and MP for Mid Sussex from 2019 to 2024. Davies has served as Shadow Secretary of State for Wales since November 2024, and was Shadow Minister for Women from 2024 to 2026. She previously served in various ministerial positions between 2018 and 2024.

Davies was first elected to Parliament as MP for Eastleigh in May 2015. She was the Parliamentary Under-Secretary of State for Wales and Parliamentary Under-Secretary of State for Sport, Civil Society and Loneliness in Theresa May's government from 2018 to 2019. After Boris Johnson became Prime Minister in July 2019, Davies was appointed Parliamentary Under-Secretary of State for Employment at the Department for Work and Pensions. She was elected in the 2019 general election as the MP for Mid Sussex. She resigned as Employment Minister in July 2022, after losing confidence in Johnson's leadership. Davies was re-elected to Parliament in 2024 after standing in the newly established East Grinstead and Uckfield constituency.

== Early life and career ==
Miriam Davies was born on 2 June 1975. She was educated at the fee-paying Royal Russell School in Croydon, and the state-sector College of Richard Collyer in Horsham, West Sussex. She then studied Politics and International Relations at Swansea University.

After graduation in Swansea, she proceeded to train as a journalist in Wales, and worked primarily as a local radio presenter, reporter and producer at both Morriston Hospital Radio and the Wave Station in South Wales from 1992 to 2003, then BBC Wales between 2003 and 2004.

It was during her life in Wales, as a radio DJ, that she earned the nickname "DJ Lovespoon". She lived in the country for more than 10 years.

She later worked as a road safety communications officer with the Automobile Association, the police force, and Sussex Safer Roads Partnership.

Davies served as a Conservative Party town councillor for Haywards Heath Town Council and as a District councillor on Mid Sussex District Council for the Haywards Heath Lucastes ward from 2011 to 2015. Her political involvement began when she was co-opted onto Hurstpierpoint and Sayers Common Parish Council.

== Parliamentary career ==
At the 2015 general election, Davies was elected to Parliament as MP for Eastleigh with 42.3% of the vote and a majority of 9,147.

She campaigned for the UK to leave the European Union during the 2016 referendum.

Davies was re-elected as MP for Eastleigh at the snap 2017 general election with an increased vote share of 50.4% and an increased majority of 14,179.

Davies was appointed an Assistant Government Whip on 9 January 2018.

In the House of Commons she sat on the Commons Reference Group on Representation and Inclusion and previously sat on the Consolidation Bills (Joint Committee) and Women and Equalities Committee. On 23 October 2018, Davies resigned from a committee chaired by Commons Speaker John Bercow, citing lack of confidence in Bercow's ability to tackle bullying and sexual harassment problems in Parliament.

On 5 November 2018, Davies was appointed Minister for Sport and Civil Society at the Department for Digital, Culture, Media and Sport, after the resignation of Tracey Crouch over a delay to the introduction of reduced limits on the stakes of fixed-odds betting terminals.

In February 2019, in her role as Sports Minister, she called for an urgent summit with English football leaders (the FA, Premier League, and EFL) in order to address issues relating to abuse in the sport. She suggested there should be a zero tolerance approach to problems concerning racist, homophobic and antisemitic chanting.

In May 2019, she attended the "End the cage age" event campaigning against caged birds. This event was organised by Compassion in World Farming. Davies stated that she was against caged laying hens.

In July 2019, new Prime Minister Boris Johnson appointed Davies to the position of Parliamentary Under-Secretary of State for Employment at the Department for Work and Pensions.

When the 2019 General Election was called in October 2019, Davies announced that she would not seek re-election as MP for the Eastleigh constituency due to her personal family complexity of living in mid-Sussex, attending parliament and representing Eastleigh. However, a few weeks later she was announced as the Conservative candidate for Mid Sussex to which she was subsequently elected at the general election with 53.3% of the vote and a majority of 18,197.

On 6 July 2022 she resigned from her position as Parliamentary Under-Secretary at the Department for Work and Pensions, having lost confidence in Boris Johnson as a result of the Chris Pincher scandal.

Due to the 2023 Periodic Review of Westminster constituencies, Davies' constituency of Mid Sussex was essentially abolished, though a new constituency with substantially different boundaries was created, and replaced with East Grinstead and Uckfield. At the 2024 general election, Davies was elected to Parliament as MP for East Grinstead and Uckfield with 38.3% of the vote and a majority of 8,480.

On 8 July 2024, Davies was appointed as Shadow Minister for Women and Equalities for Rishi Sunak's shadow cabinet.

In October 2024, she was elected as a member of the Culture, Media and Sport Committee.

== Parliamentary Under-Secretary of State for Wales and Shadow Secretary of State for Wales ==
Davies was appointed to the role of Parliamentary Under-Secretary of State for Wales on 26 July 2018. Whilst at the Wales Office, Davies helped deliver the North Wales Growth Deal and the abolition of the Severn Bridge tolls.

On 5 November 2024, after the Welsh Conservatives lost all of its MPs in the 2024 General Election Davies was appointed as Shadow Secretary of State for Wales in Kemi Badenoch's shadow cabinet, replacing Byron Davies, Baron Davies of Gower.

In an op-ed, Davies described her appointment to the Shadow Secretary of State for Wales role as "one of the highest honours in her life".

In February 2025, Davies criticised Jo Stevens, claiming the Secretary of State for Wales was “politicising” impartial civil servants.

In May, Davies wrote an op-ed condemning a Welsh Labour council for showing pupils material how to "safely choke people in sex". Davies said: "It is completely abhorrent to even try to normalise strangulation in any relationship where our young people are meant to be learning about trust, commitment and intimacy. We are clear this clueless Labour Council, and the Labour-run Welsh and UK Governments need to step in and stop this for the sake of young women and girls."

== Personal life ==
She was a carer to her two elderly parents before becoming an MP, which she has said "informed a significant portion of her parliamentary work". She is a keen runner and has completed several long-distance races, including the 2017 London Marathon.

Mims was married to Mark Davies until their divorce in 2017 and with whom she has two children.

When she lived in Wales Davies was a radio DJ and earned the nickname "DJ Lovespoon".

== Notes ==
Parliament of the United Kingdom
Preceded by Mike Thornton	Member of Parliament for Eastleigh; 2015–2019	Succeeded by Paul Holmes
Preceded by Nicholas Soames	Member of Parliament for Mid Sussex; 2019–2024	Succeeded by Alison Bennett
New constituency	Member of Parliament for East Grinstead and Uckfield; 2024–present	Incumbent
