= 2010 Wandsworth London Borough Council election =

2010 local election in England

- 6 May 2010

All 60 seats to Wandsworth London Borough Council 31 seats needed for a majority
	First party	Second party
Party	Conservative	Labour
Last election	51 seats, 51.0%	9 seats, 24.2%
Seats won	47	13
Seat change	▼4	▲4
Popular vote	69,737	44,289
Percentage	45.0%	28.6%
Swing	▼6.0%	▲4.4%
- Map of the results of the 2010 Wandsworth council election. Conservatives in blue and Labour in red.
Council control before election
Conservative
Council control after election
Conservative

The 2010 elections for the London Borough of Wandsworth Council were held on 6 May 2010. All 20 3-member wards were up for election, for a total of 60 councillors. The 2010 General Election and other local elections took place on the same day.

The Conservative Party were defending a strong position on the council, with 51 councillors previously elected and having maintained overall control of the council since 1978. The Labour Party were hoping to increase their representation from nine councillors, whilst the Liberal Democrats and other parties were hoping to secure representation on the council.

The Conservative Party subsequently held control of the Council with a reduced number of seats and majority.

== Results ==
Wandsworth Council election result 2010
Party	Seats	Gains	Losses	Net gain/loss	Seats %	Votes %	Votes	+/−
Conservative	47		3	-3		45.0	69,737	
Labour	13	4		+4		28.6	44,289	
Liberal Democrats	0					17.4	27,025	
Green	0					8.7	13,421	
BNP	0					0.1	218	
CPA	0					0.1	154	
Communist	0					0.1	138	
Independent	0		1	-1		0.1	135	

== Ward results ==
Balham (3)
Party	Candidate	Votes	%	±%
Conservative	Paul Ellis	4,102	52.0	
Conservative	Caroline Usher	4,007	50.8	
Conservative	Russell King	4,003	50.7	
Labour	Alice Cookson	1,974	25.0	
Labour	Edward Elliott	1,784	22.6	
Liberal Democrats	Joan Gibbs	1,524	19.3	
Labour	Bockari Vandi	1,504	19.1	
Liberal Democrats	Muriel Cronin	1,484	18.8	
Liberal Democrats	Matthew Green	1,474	18.7	
Green	Siobhan Vitelli	786	10.0	
Turnout		7,891	67.1	
Conservative hold		Swing		
Conservative hold		Swing		
Conservative hold		Swing		

Bedford (3)
Party	Candidate	Votes	%	±%
Conservative	Antonia Dunn	3,351	44.2	
Conservative	Alexander Jacob	3,068	40.4	
Conservative	John Locker	3,023	39.8	
Labour	Thomas Baker	2,673	35.2	
Labour	Sara Higham	2,299	30.3	
Labour	Tim Walker	2,025	26.7	
Liberal Democrats	Anthony Fennelly	1,458	19.2	
Liberal Democrats	Henrietta Norman	1,310	17.3	
Liberal Democrats	Masood Khan	1,309	17.3	
Green	John Rattray	710	9.4	
Green	Caroline van Issum	525	6.9	
Turnout		7,588	64.8	
Conservative hold		Swing		
Conservative hold		Swing		
Conservative hold		Swing		

Earlsfield (3)
Party	Candidate	Votes	%	±%
Conservative	Angela Graham	3,887	52.3	
Conservative	Matthew Maxwell Scott	3,418	46.0	
Conservative	Charles McNaught-Davis	3,336	44.9	
Labour	Sarah Guerra	2,068	27.8	
Labour	Eleanor Kilyon	2,052	27.6	
Labour	John Russell	1,750	23.6	
Liberal Democrats	Michael Clifton	1,659	22.3	
Liberal Democrats	Tracey Langley	1,320	17.8	
Liberal Democrats	Rashid Mustafi	893	12.0	
Green	Steven Goldsmith	790	10.6	
Turnout		7,428	64.5	
Conservative hold		Swing		
Conservative hold		Swing		
Conservative hold		Swing		

East Putney (3)
Party	Candidate	Votes	%	±%
Conservative	Leslie McDonnell	4,004	55.2	
Conservative	Ravi Govindia	3,706	51.1	
Conservative	Robert Morritt	3,651	50.4	
Liberal Democrats	Emma Lindsay	1,452	20.0	
Labour	Christian Klapp	1,449	20.0	
Labour	Gemma Reay	1,443	19.9	
Labour	Dominic le Moignan	1,342	18.5	
Liberal Democrats	Godfrey Shocket	1,239	17.1	
Liberal Democrats	Jason Whyte	1,198	16.5	
Green	Caroline Austin	663	9.1	
Green	Richard Morris	579	8.0	
Turnout		7,250	61.6	
Conservative hold		Swing		
Conservative hold		Swing		
Conservative hold		Swing		

Fairfield (3)
Party	Candidate	Votes	%	±%
Conservative	Vanessa Graham	3,991	54.7	
Conservative	Piers McCausland	3,657	50.1	
Conservative	Stuart Thom	3,640	49.9	
Labour	Fitzroy Beckford	1,774	24.3	
Labour	Marcus Messenger	1,692	23.2	
Labour	Fred Ponsonby	1,576	21.6	
Liberal Democrats	Christina Lees	1,477	20.2	
Liberal Democrats	Patrick Warren	1,255	17.2	
Liberal Democrats	Adam Watson	990	13.6	
Green	Robin Bennet	924	12.7	
Turnout		7,298	63.2	
Conservative hold		Swing		
Conservative hold		Swing		
Conservative hold		Swing		

Furzedown (3)
Party	Candidate	Votes	%	±%
Labour	Leonie Cooper	3,750	52.1	
Labour	John Farebrother	3,527	49.0	
Labour	Mark Thomas	3,321	46.2	
Conservative	Peter Anthony	2,116	29.4	
Conservative	Louise Goodall	2,083	28.9	
Conservative	James Langley	1,818	25.3	
Liberal Democrats	Stephen Cooles	1,102	15.3	
Liberal Democrats	Alasdair Craig	908	12.9	
Liberal Democrats	Javed Kayani	769	10.7	
Green	Ciaran Butler	565	7.9	
Green	Michael Day	507	7.0	
Turnout		7,196	65.7	
Labour gain from Conservative		Swing		
Labour hold		Swing		
Labour hold		Swing		

Graveney (3)
Party	Candidate	Votes	%	±%
Labour	Andy Gibbons	3,158	44.3	
Labour	Rex Osborn	3,009	42.2	
Labour	Billi Randall	2,745	38.5	
Liberal Democrats	Jeremy Ambache	2,246	31.5	
Liberal Democrats	Stephanie Dearden	2,160	30.3	
Liberal Democrats	Surinder Singh Rhode	1,929	27.0	
Conservative	Jonathan Cox	1,663	23.3	
Conservative	Mandy Chowdhri	1,547	21.7	
Conservative	Sarbani Mazumdar	1,288	18.1	
Green	Martin Williams	631	8.8	
Turnout		7,134	63.2	
Labour hold		Swing		
Labour hold		Swing		
Labour hold		Swing		

Latchmere (3)
Party	Candidate	Votes	%	±%
Labour	Tony Belton	2,951	47.7	
Labour	Wendy Speck	2,712	43.8	
Labour	Simon Hogg	2,667	43.1	
Conservative	John Stevenson	2,084	33.7	
Conservative	Nat Okoye	2,023	32.7	
Conservative	Neil Turner	1,874	30.3	
Liberal Democrats	Layla Moran	992	16.0	
Liberal Democrats	Jamie Gillespie	903	14.6	
Liberal Democrats	Luke Taylor	826	13.4	
Green	Alexandros Germanis	513	8.3	
CPA	Peter Wolstenholme	154	2.5	
Turnout		6,185	57.6	
Labour hold		Swing		
Labour hold		Swing		
Labour hold		Swing		

Nightingale (3)
Party	Candidate	Votes	%	±%
Conservative	Sarah McDermott	4,026	50.5	
Conservative	Ian Hart	3,910	49.0	
Conservative	Sheldon Wilkie	3,574	44.8	
Labour	Elisabeth Davies	2,181	27.3	
Labour	Stephen Jones	1,811	22.7	
Labour	Mark Panto	1,787	22.4	
Liberal Democrats	Gemma Christian	1,759	22.0	
Liberal Democrats	Edward Clapham	1,448	18.1	
Liberal Democrats	Munawar Asif	1,268	15.9	
Green	Bruce Mackenzie	973	12.2	
Turnout		7,980	68.8	
Conservative hold		Swing		
Conservative hold		Swing		
Conservative hold		Swing		

Northcote (3)
Party	Candidate	Votes	%	±%
Conservative	Jenny Browne	4,628	60.1	
Conservative	Peter Dawson	4,278	55.6	
Conservative	Martin Johnson	4,099	53.2	
Labour	Neil Coburn	1,742	22.6	
Labour	Harvey Heath	1,499	19.5	
Liberal Democrats	Charles Cronin	1,255	16.3	
Labour	Shalu Kanal	1,232	16.0	
Liberal Democrats	Christine Green	1,180	15.3	
Liberal Democrats	Tom Paul	982	12.8	
Green	Guy Evans	580	7.5	
Green	Sophy Hansford	579	7.5	
Turnout		7,700	66.6	
Conservative hold		Swing		
Conservative hold		Swing		
Conservative hold		Swing		

Queenstown (3)
Party	Candidate	Votes	%	±%
Conservative	Nicola Nardelli	2,894	43.0	
Conservative	Jo-Anne Nadler	2,888	42.9	
Conservative	Alexander Raubitschek	2,781	41.3	
Labour	Jayne Harding	2,385	35.4	
Labour	Gareth Noble	2,327	34.6	
Labour	Peter Taylor	2,133	31.7	
Liberal Democrats	Alex Cameron	1,113	16.5	
Liberal Democrats	Helen Norbury	886	13.2	
Liberal Democrats	Michael Rodgers	751	11.2	
Green	Brian Barnes	562	8.3	
Green	Joe Stuart	490	7.3	
Turnout		6,732	56.4	
Conservative hold		Swing		
Conservative hold		Swing		
Conservative hold		Swing		

Roehampton and Putney Heath (3)
Party	Candidate	Votes	%	±%
Conservative	Adrian Knowles	2,297	41.8	
Conservative	Jennifer Nickels	2,192	39.9	
Labour	Peter Carpenter	2,136	38.8	
Labour	Sean Lawless	2,093	38.1	
Conservative	Andrew Penfold	2,082	37.9	
Labour	Donald Roy	1,913	34.8	
Liberal Democrats	Elizabeth Daly	1,053	19.1	
Liberal Democrats	Hugh Brown	899	16.3	
Liberal Democrats	Valerie Shelmerdine	853	15.5	
Green	Graham Humphreys	418	7.6	
Turnout		5,500	50.4	
Conservative hold		Swing		
Conservative hold		Swing		
Labour gain from Conservative		Swing		

Shaftesbury (3)
Party	Candidate	Votes	%	±%
Conservative	James Cousins	3,804	53.2	
Conservative	Jonathan Cook	3,751	52.5	
Conservative	Guy Senior	3,586	50.2	
Labour	Sara Linton	2,027	28.4	
Labour	Geoffrey Boyd	1,689	23.6	
Labour	Stephen Ryan	1,525	21.3	
Liberal Democrats	Jemima Bland	1,233	17.3	
Liberal Democrats	Alexi Sugden	1,031	14.4	
Liberal Democrats	Catherine Turner	922	12.9	
Green	Marian Hoffman	518	7.2	
Green	Peter Mason	430	6.0	
Turnout		7,147	62.7	
Conservative hold		Swing		
Conservative hold		Swing		
Conservative hold		Swing		

Southfields (3)
Party	Candidate	Votes	%	±%
Conservative	Lucy Allan	4,101	51.4	
Conservative	Guy Humphries	3,952	49.6	
Conservative	Terence Walsh	3,842	48.2	
Labour	Matthew Hay	1,922	24.1	
Labour	Thomas Marsom	1,877	23.5	
Labour	Alex Lisinge	1,748	21.9	
Liberal Democrats	Jennifer Underwood	1,607	20.2	
Liberal Democrats	Anna Marie Ahmed	1,557	19.5	
Liberal Democrats	Anthony Burrett	1,290	16.2	
Green	Tomasz Sokolowski	610	7.6	
Independent	Edward Larkin	135	1.7	
Turnout		7,974	65.1	
Conservative hold		Swing		
Conservative hold		Swing		
Conservative hold		Swing		

St Mary's Park (3)
Party	Candidate	Votes	%	±%
Conservative	Mark Davies	3,712	51.7	
Conservative	John Hallmark	3,641	50.7	
Conservative	Tessa Strickland	3,435	47.8	
Labour	William Martindale	2,013	28.0	
Labour	Jessica Studdert	1,926	26.8	
Labour	Anthony Tuck	1,738	24.2	
Liberal Democrats	David Owen-Jones	1,210	16.9	
Liberal Democrats	Jeremy Porter	991	13.8	
Liberal Democrats	Ruwan Kodikara	916	12.8	
Green	Diarmuid McMullan	766	10.7	
Turnout		7,180	58.5	
Conservative hold		Swing		
Conservative hold		Swing		
Conservative hold		Swing		

Thamesfield (3)
Party	Candidate	Votes	%	±%
Conservative	Edward Udny-Lister	4,938	61.6	
Conservative	Rosemary Torrington	4,685	58.5	
Conservative	James Maddan	4,654	58.1	
Labour	Janet Grimshaw	1,559	19.5	
Liberal Democrats	Moira Sanders	1,479	18.5	
Labour	Christopher Locke	1,387	17.3	
Liberal Democrats	Marcus Sampaio Vilaca	1,194	14.9	
Labour	Kalsoom Qureshi	1,192	14.9	
Liberal Democrats	Matha Zantides	1,043	13.0	
Green	Jonathan Mercer	849	10.6	
Turnout		8,014	67.5	
Conservative hold		Swing		
Conservative hold		Swing		
Conservative hold		Swing		

Tooting (3)
Party	Candidate	Votes	%	±%
Labour	Sheila Boswell	3,416	47.0	
Labour	Benjamin Johnson	3,291	45.3	
Labour	James Daley	3,154	43.4	
Conservative	Stewart Finn	2,399	33.0	
Conservative	Andrew Peterkin	2,129	29.3	
Conservative	Christopher Slack	2,125	29.2	
Liberal Democrats	Atta-Ul Haq	1,075	14.8	
Liberal Democrats	Fahim Junjua	1,022	14.1	
Liberal Democrats	Kulendran Vallipuram	933	12.8	
Green	Michael Schwarz	540	7.4	
Green	Timothy Turner	494	6.8	
Communist	Phil Brand	138	1.9	
Turnout		7,269	62.6	
Labour gain from Conservative		Swing		
Labour gain from Conservative		Swing		
Labour hold		Swing		

Wandsworth Common (3)
Party	Candidate	Votes	%	±%
Conservative	Claire Clay	4,706	62.9	
Conservative	Maurice Heaster	4,563	61.0	
Conservative	Kathy Tracey	4,329	57.9	
Labour	Derek Honeyball	1,470	19.7	
Labour	Veronica King	1,380	18.5	
Labour	Dan Smith	1,209	16.2	
Liberal Democrats	Tamara Page	1,088	14.6	
Liberal Democrats	David Patterson	1,050	14.0	
Liberal Democrats	Ashley Jones	967	12.9	
Green	Roy Vickery	717	9.6	
Turnout		7,477	69.8	
Conservative hold		Swing		
Conservative hold		Swing		
Conservative hold		Swing		

West Hill (3)
Party	Candidate	Votes	%	±%
Conservative	Elizabeth Howlett	3,349	49.7	
Conservative	Nicholas Cuff	3,157	46.9	
Conservative	Malcolm Grimston	2,976	44.2	
Labour	Reed McKinney	1,924	28.6	
Labour	Basheer Khan	1,836	27.3	
Labour	Ferdous Rahman	1,653	24.6	
Liberal Democrats	Catherine Devons	1,166	17.3	
Liberal Democrats	Ryan Bate	1,105	16.4	
Liberal Democrats	Christopher Ward	864	12.8	
Green	Simon Childs	728	10.8	
BNP	Steve Roche	218	3.2	
Turnout		6,732	56.1	
Conservative hold		Swing		
Conservative hold		Swing		
Conservative hold		Swing		

West Putney (3)
Party	Candidate	Votes	%	±%
Conservative	Jane Cooper	3,685	54.6	
Conservative	Liz Stokes	3,670	54.3	
Conservative	Steffi Sutters	3,487	51.6	
Labour	Maureen Booker	1,717	25.4	
Labour	Daniel Lawless	1,461	21.6	
Labour	Patrick Macfarlane	1,421	21.0	
Liberal Democrats	Alexander Ehmann	1,077	15.9	
Liberal Democrats	Giles Wilkes	1,056	15.6	
Liberal Democrats	Robert Williams	941	13.9	
Green	Helen Lawrence	578	8.6	
Turnout		6,753	62.3	
Conservative hold		Swing		
Conservative hold		Swing		
Conservative hold		Swing		
