= Mid Sussex (constituency) =

UK Parliament constituency (since 1974)

Coordinates: 50.96°N 0.17°W

- County constituency for the House of Commons
- Boundaries since 2024
- Boundary of Mid Sussex in South East England
- County: West Sussex
- Electorate: 72,255 (2023)
- Major settlements: Haywards Heath; Burgess Hill

Current constituency
- Created: 1974
- Member of Parliament: Alison Bennett (Liberal Democrats)
- Seats: One
- Created from: East Grinstead and Lewes

Mid Sussex is a constituency (Note: A county constituency (for the purposes of election expenses and type of returning officer)) represented in the House of Commons of the UK Parliament from 2024 by Alison Bennett, a Liberal Democrat. (Note: As with all constituencies, the constituency elects one Member of Parliament (MP) by the first past the post system of election at least every five years.)

== Constituency profile ==
Mid Sussex is a constituency in West Sussex. Its main settlements are the towns of Haywards Heath and Burgess Hill, which have populations of around 42,000 and 35,000, respectively. Other settlements include the villages of Hurstpierpoint, Hassocks and Cuckfield.

Mid Sussex's settlements lie amongst a hilly, rural area; the High Weald National Landscape and South Downs National Park both pass through the constituency. The towns of Haywards Heath and Burgess Hill developed rapidly during the mid-19th century upon the arrival of the London and Brighton Railway, which connected the area to London (around 35 miles (56 km) north) and Brighton (around 10 miles (16 km) south). Today, the area is highly affluent and houses many middle-class commuters to London, Brighton, Crawley and Gatwick Airport. The average house price is higher than the national and South East England averages.

Residents of the constituency have high levels of education and homeownership. Rates of household income are very high, and the child poverty rate is very low. A high proportion of residents work in professional occupations, particularly in the retail and education sectors, and the percentage of residents claiming unemployment benefits is low. White people made up 92% of the population at the 2021 census.

At the local district council, most of the constituency is represented by Liberal Democrats with some Conservatives elected in the rural areas. At the county council, which held elections in 2026, all seats in the constituency elected Liberal Democrats. An estimated 55% of voters in Mid Sussex supported remaining in the European Union in the 2016 referendum, higher than the nationwide figure of 48%.

== Boundaries ==
Map of 2010–2024 boundaries

=== Historic ===
1974–1983: The Urban Districts of Burgess Hill and Cuckfield, and the Rural District of Cuckfield.

1983–1997: The District of Mid Sussex wards of Ardingly, Bolney, Burgess Hill Chanctonbury, Burgess Hill Franklands, Burgess Hill North, Burgess Hill St Andrews, Burgess Hill Town, Burgess Hill West, Clayton, Cuckfield, East Grinstead East, East Grinstead North, East Grinstead South, East Grinstead West, Haywards Heath Ashenground, Haywards Heath Bentswood, Haywards Heath Franklands, Haywards Heath Harlands, Haywards Heath Heath, Horsted Keynes, Hurstpierpoint, Keymer, Lindfield Rural, Lindfield Urban, and West Hoathly.

1997–2010: The District of Mid Sussex wards of Ardingly, Burgess Hill Chanctonbury, Burgess Hill Franklands, Burgess Hill North, Burgess Hill St Andrews, Burgess Hill Town, Burgess Hill West, Cuckfield, East Grinstead East, East Grinstead North, East Grinstead South, East Grinstead West, Haywards Heath Ashenground, Haywards Heath Bentswood, Haywards Heath Franklands, Haywards Heath Harlands, Haywards Heath Heath, Horsted Keynes, Lindfield Rural, Lindfield Urban, and West Hoathly.

2010–2024: The District of Mid Sussex wards of Ashurst Wood, Bolney, Burgess Hill Dunstall, Burgess Hill Franklands, Burgess Hill Leylands, Burgess Hill Meeds, Burgess Hill St Andrews, Burgess Hill Victoria, Cuckfield, East Grinstead Ashplats, East Grinstead Baldwins, East Grinstead Herontye, East Grinstead Imberhorne, East Grinstead Town, Haywards Heath Ashenground, Haywards Heath Bentswood, Haywards Heath Franklands, Haywards Heath Heath, Haywards Heath Lucastes, High Weald, and Lindfield.

=== Current ===
Further to the 2023 Periodic Review of Westminster constituencies which became effective for the 2024 general election, the constituency was defined as being composed of the following as they existed on 1 December 2020:

- The District of Mid Sussex wards of: Bolney; Burgess Hill Dunstall; Burgess Hill Franklands; Burgess Hill Leylands; Burgess Hill Meeds; Burgess Hill St. Andrews; Burgess Hill Victoria; Cuckfield; Hassocks; Haywards Heath Ashenground; Haywards Heath Bentswood; Haywards Heath Franklands; Haywards Heath Heath; Haywards Heath Lucastes; Hurstpierpoint and Downs; Lindfield.

Following a local government boundary review which came into effect in May 2023, the constituency now comprises the following from the 2024 general election:

- The District of Mid Sussex wards of Ardingly, Balcombe & Turners Hill (small part); Burgess Hill Dunstall; Burgess Hill Franklands; Burgess Hill Leylands; Burgess Hill Meeds & Hammonds; Burgess Hill St Andrews; Burgess Hill Victoria; Cuckfield, Bolney & Ansty; Downland Villages; Hassocks; Haywards Heath Ashenground; Haywards Heath Bentswood & Heath; Haywards Heath Franklands; Haywards Heath Lucastes & Bolnore; Haywards Heath North; Hurstpierpoint; Lindfield; Lindfield Rural & High Weald (small part).

The electorate was reduced to bring it within the permitted range by transferring northern parts, including the town of East Grinstead to the newly created constituency of East Grinstead and Uckfield. This was partly offset by adding the villages of Hassocks and Hurstpierpoint from Arundel and South Downs.

== History ==
The constituency was created in 1974 from parts of the seats of Lewes and East Grinstead, and has undergone significant boundary changes at every periodical review that it has been around for. Prior to 1973, the local government district had actually been a part of East Sussex, but as a result of delayed implementation of the Local Government Act 1972, it was almost wholly moved into West Sussex.

At the 1983 general election, it gained some of the wards (including East Grinstead itself) previously contained in the East Grinstead constituency (which disappeared at that election, its last MP Geoffrey Johnson Smith contested and won the new seat of Wealden in East Sussex), and at the 1997 election, it gained many of the semi-rural wards with smaller communities between East Grinstead and Crawley. For the 2024 election, the seat lost East Grinstead again – to the new seat of East Grinstead and Uckfield.

From its creation in 1974 until 2024, it was a Conservative seat. Its first MP was Tim Renton, who held the seat until 1997. He was succeeded by Nicholas Soames (a grandson of former Prime Minister Winston Churchill), who had been MP for the neighbouring seat of Crawley from 1983 to 1997.

In the 2016 European Union referendum, Mid Sussex voted for the United Kingdom to remain a member of the European Union. Despite this, Soames called for MPs to back Theresa May's withdrawal agreement. However, he was one of the 21 Conservative rebels who voted to allow Parliament to vote to legislate to prevent a no deal Brexit on 3 September 2019, and subsequently became an independent, after the rebels had the Conservative whip removed. He then decided not to stand for re-election although he had the whip restored before dissolution.

Soames was succeeded by Mims Davies, who had been MP for Eastleigh in Hampshire from 2015 to 2019. Following boundary changes for the 2024 general election, Davies stood down and decided to stand (successfully) for the notionally safer new seat of East Grinstead and Uckfield.

The primary opposition to the Conservatives until the 2015 election had been the Liberal Democrats and their predecessors the Liberal Party. In 2015, there was a severe fall in Liberal Democrats' support. Labour's candidate came second in the seat for the first time in its history. In 2017, Labour consolidated this lead at the 2017 general election by gaining almost double the votes of the Liberal Democrats. The Liberal Democrats regained a clear second place in the 2019 general election, and won the seat in 2024 following boundary changes, with Alison Bennett being elected as the new MP.

== Members of Parliament ==
East Grinstead and Lewes prior to 1974

Election	Member	Party
Feb 1974	Tim Renton	Conservative
1997	Sir Nicholas Soames	Conservative
2019	Sir Nicholas Soames	Independent
2019	Sir Nicholas Soames	Conservative
2019	Mims Davies	Conservative
2024	Alison Bennett	Liberal Democrats

== Elections ==
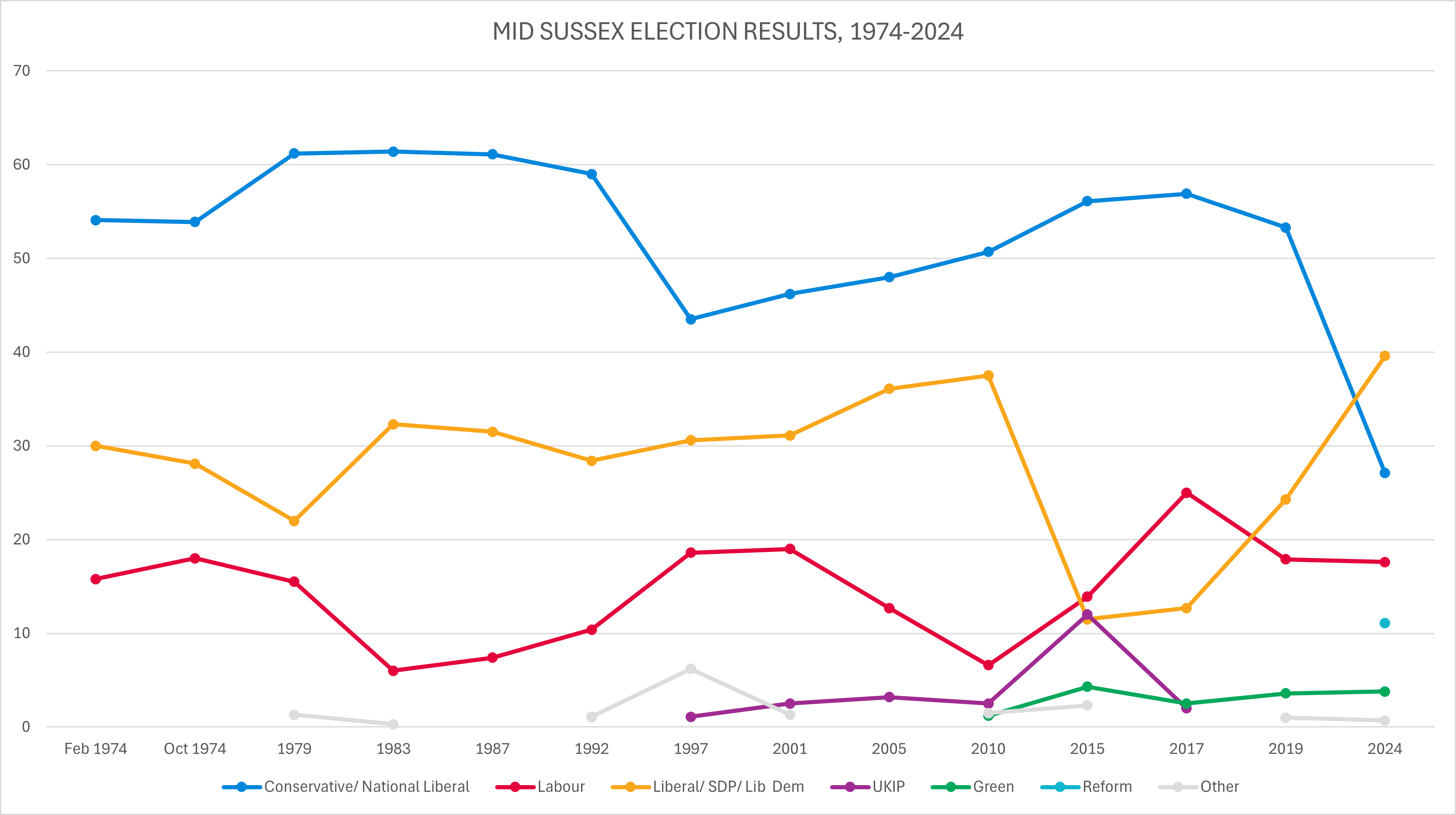
Election results 1974-2024

=== Elections in the 2020s ===
General election 2024: Mid Sussex
Party	Candidate	Votes	%	±%
Liberal Democrats	Alison Bennett	21,136	39.6	+14.1
Conservative	Kristy Adams	14,474	27.1	−24.2
Labour	Dave Rowntree	9,397	17.6	−0.4
Reform	Gary Johnson	5,921	11.1	N/A
Green	Deanna Nicholson	2,048	3.8	−0.3
Monster Raving Loony	Baron Von Thunderclap	352	0.7	−0.3
Majority		6,662	12.5	N/A
Turnout		53,328	70.2	−3.1
Registered electors		75,969		
Liberal Democrats gain from Conservative		Swing	+19.2	

=== Elections in the 2010s ===
2019 notional result
Party	Vote	%
Conservative	27,154	51.3
Liberal Democrats	13,489	25.5
Labour	9,530	18.0
Green	2,179	4.1
Others	597	1.1
Turnout	52,949	73.3
Electorate	72,255	

General election 2019: Mid Sussex
Party	Candidate	Votes	%	±%
Conservative	Mims Davies	33,455	53.3	−3.6
Liberal Democrats	Robert Eggleston	15,258	24.3	+11.6
Labour	Gemma Bolton	11,218	17.9	−7.1
Green	Deanna Nicholson	2,234	3.6	+1.1
Monster Raving Loony	Baron Von Thunderclap	550	0.9	+0.1
Advance	Brett Mortensen	47	0.1	N/A
Majority		18,197	29.0	−2.9
Turnout		62,762	73.7	+0.9
Conservative hold		Swing	−7.6	

- Davies had served as Member of Parliament for Eastleigh from 2015 until the 2019 election was called.

General election 2017: Mid Sussex
Party	Candidate	Votes	%	±%
Conservative	Nicholas Soames	35,082	56.9	+0.8
Labour	Greg Mountain	15,409	25.0	+11.1
Liberal Democrats	Sarah Osborne	7,855	12.7	+1.2
Green	Chris Jerrey	1,571	2.5	−1.8
UKIP	Toby Brothers	1,251	2.0	−10.0
Monster Raving Loony	Baron Von Thunderclap	464	0.8	+0.2
Majority		19,673	31.9	−10.3
Turnout		61,632	72.8	+0.5
Conservative hold		Swing	−5.15	

General election 2015: Mid Sussex
Party	Candidate	Votes	%	±%
Conservative	Nicholas Soames	32,268	56.1	+5.4
Labour	Greg Mountain	7,982	13.9	+7.3
UKIP	Toby Brothers	6,898	12.0	+9.5
Liberal Democrats	Daisy Cooper	6,604	11.5	−26.0
Green	Miranda Diboll	2,453	4.3	+3.1
Independent	Beki Adam	958	1.7	N/A
Monster Raving Loony	Baron Von Thunderclap	329	0.6	+0.1
Majority		24,286	42.2	+29.0
Turnout		57,492	72.3	−0.1
Conservative hold		Swing	−0.95	

General election 2010: Mid Sussex
Party	Candidate	Votes	%	±%
Conservative	Nicholas Soames	28,329	50.7	+2.5
Liberal Democrats	Serena Tierney	20,927	37.5	+1.8
Labour	David Boot	3,689	6.6	–6.2
UKIP	Marc Montgomery	1,423	2.5	–0.7
Green	Paul Brown	645	1.2	N/A
BNP	Stuart Minihane	583	1.0	N/A
Monster Raving Loony	Baron von Thunderclap	259	0.5	N/A
Majority		7,402	13.2	+0.7
Turnout		55,855	72.4	+0.35
Conservative hold		Swing	+1.3	

=== Elections in the 2000s ===
General election 2005: Mid Sussex
Party	Candidate	Votes	%	±%
Conservative	Nicholas Soames	23,765	48.0	+1.8
Liberal Democrats	Serena Tierney	17,875	36.1	+5.0
Labour	Robert Fromant	6,280	12.7	−6.3
UKIP	Harold Piggott	1,574	3.2	+0.7
Majority		5,890	11.9	−3.2
Turnout		49,494	68.6	+3.7
Conservative hold		Swing	−1.6	

General election 2001: Mid Sussex
Party	Candidate	Votes	%	±%
Conservative	Nicholas Soames	21,150	46.2	+2.7
Liberal Democrats	Lesley Wilkins	14,252	31.1	+0.5
Labour	Paul Mitchell	8,693	19.0	+0.4
UKIP	Petrina Holdsworth	1,126	2.5	+1.4
Monster Raving Loony	Baron Von Thunderclap Berry	601	1.3	N/A
Majority		6,898	15.1	+2.2
Turnout		45,822	64.9	−12.7
Conservative hold		Swing		

=== Elections in the 1990s ===
General election 1997: Mid Sussex
Party	Candidate	Votes	%	±%
Conservative	Nicholas Soames	23,231	43.5	−15.5
Liberal Democrats	Margaret Collins	16,377	30.6	+2.4
Labour	Mervyn Hamilton	9,969	18.6	+8.0
Referendum	Tam Large	3,146	5.9	N/A
UKIP	J.V. Barnett	606	1.1	N/A
Justice and Renewal Independent Party	Ernest Tudway	134	0.3	N/A
Majority		6,854	12.9	−17.9
Turnout		53,463	77.6	
Conservative hold		Swing		

This constituency underwent boundary changes between the 1992 and 1997 general elections and thus change in share of vote is based on a notional calculation.

General election 1992: Mid Sussex
Party	Candidate	Votes	%	±%
Conservative	Tim Renton	39,524	59.0	−2.1
Liberal Democrats	Margaret Collins	18,996	28.4	−3.1
Labour	L C Gregory	6,951	10.4	+3.0
Green	H G Stevens	772	1.1	N/A
Monster Raving Loony	P B Berry	392	0.6	N/A
Independent	P D Hodkin	246	0.4	N/A
Natural Law	A M A Hankey	89	0.1	N/A
Majority		20,528	30.6	+1.0
Turnout		66,970	82.9	+5.7
Conservative hold		Swing		

=== Elections in the 1980s ===
General election 1987: Mid Sussex
Party	Candidate	Votes	%	±%
Conservative	Tim Renton	37,781	61.1	−0.3
Liberal	Nicholas Westbrook	19,489	31.5	−0.8
Labour	Robert Hughes	4,573	7.4	+1.4
Majority		18,292	29.6	+0.5
Turnout		61,843	77.2	+2.5
Conservative hold		Swing		

General election 1983: Mid Sussex
Party	Candidate	Votes	%	±%
Conservative	Tim Renton	35,310	61.4	
Liberal	Jack Campbell	18,566	32.3	
Labour	Patricia Hawkes	3,470	6.0	
Independent	J Bray	196	0.3	
Majority		16,744	29.1	
Turnout		57,542	74.7	
Conservative hold		Swing		

This constituency underwent boundary changes between the 1979 and 1983 general elections and thus calculation of the change in share of vote is not possible.

=== Elections in the 1970s ===
General election 1979: Mid Sussex
Party	Candidate	Votes	%	±%
Conservative	Tim Renton	32,548	61.2	+7.3
Liberal	Jack Campbell	11,705	22.0	−6.1
Labour	Des Turner	8,260	15.5	−2.5
Ind. Conservative	S M H Haslett	697	1.3	N/A
Majority		20,843	39.2	+13.4
Turnout		53,210	78.0	+1.6
Conservative hold		Swing		

General election October 1974: Mid Sussex
Party	Candidate	Votes	%	±%
Conservative	Tim Renton	25,126	53.9	−0.2
Liberal	Bob Symes	13,129	28.1	−1.9
Labour	M R Fraser	8,404	18.0	+2.2
Majority		11,997	25.8	+1.7
Turnout		46,659	76.4	−6.9
Conservative hold		Swing		

General election February 1974: Mid Sussex
Party	Candidate	Votes	%	±%
Conservative	Tim Renton	27,317	54.1	
Liberal	Bob Symes	15,162	30.0	
Labour	M R Fraser	7,993	15.8	
Majority		12,155	24.1	
Turnout		50,472	83.3	
Conservative win (new seat)				

== See also ==
- List of parliamentary constituencies in West Sussex
- List of parliamentary constituencies in the South East England (region)

== Sources ==
- Election result, 2015 (BBC)
- Election result, 2010 (BBC)
- Election result, 2005 (BBC)
- Election results, 1997–2001 (BBC)
- Election results, 1997–2001 (Election Demon)
- Election results, 1983–1997 (Election Demon)
- Election results, 1974–2001 (Political Science Resources)
