= 2014 Wandsworth London Borough Council election =

- 22 May 2014

All 60 seats to Wandsworth London Borough Council 31 seats needed for a majority
	First party	Second party
Party	Conservative	Labour
Last election	47 seats, 45.0%	13 seats, 28.6%
Seats won	41	19
Seat change	▼6	▲6
Percentage	39.8%	32.2%
Swing	▼5.2%	▲3.6%
- Map of the results of the 2014 Wandsworth council election. Conservatives in blue and Labour in red.
Council control before election
Conservative
Council control after election
Conservative

The 2014 Wandsworth Council election took place on 22 May 2014 to elect members of Wandsworth Council in London, England. This was on the same day as other local elections.

== Results ==
The Conservatives retained control winning 41 seats (-6). Labour won 19 seats (+6).

== Ward results ==
Balham (3)
Party	Candidate	Votes	%	±%
Conservative	Caroline Usher	2,150	54.1	+3.3
Conservative	Clare Sailer	2,052	51.6	+0.9
Conservative	Paul Ellis	2,041	51.4	−0.6
Labour	Caroline Hyland	1,126	28.3	+3.3
Labour	Alan McDonald	1,095	27.6	+5.0
Labour	Toby Powell	869	21.9	+2.8
Green	Siobhan Vitelli	676	17.0	+7.0
Liberal Democrats	Muriel Cronin	419	10.5	−8.3
Liberal Democrats	Matthew Green	370	9.3	−9.4
UKIP	Ralph Brockman	241	6.1	N/A
Turnout		3,973	24.6	
Conservative hold		Swing		
Conservative hold		Swing		
Conservative hold		Swing		

Bedford (3)
Party	Candidate	Votes	%	±%
Labour	Fleur Anderson	1,935	43.1	+7.9
Conservative	Antonia Dunn	1,895	42.2	−2.0
Labour	Rosena Allin-Khan	1,843	41.0	+10.7
Conservative	Alex Jacob	1,828	40.7	+0.3
Conservative	John Locker	1,826	40.6	+0.8
Labour	Sophia Parker	1,716	38.2	+11.5
Green	Roy Vickery	673	15.0	+5.6
Liberal Democrats	William Woodward	329	7.3	−11.9
Liberal Democrats	Andrew Wells	288	6.4	−10.9
UKIP	Robert Cox	243	5.4	N/A
Turnout		4,494	39.5	
Labour gain from Conservative		Swing		
Conservative hold		Swing		
Labour gain from Conservative		Swing		

Earlsfield (3)
Party	Candidate	Votes	%	±%
Conservative	Adrian Knowles	2,164	45.2	−7.1
Conservative	Charles Lescott	2,089	43.6	−2.4
Labour	Rachael Stokes	1,877	39.2	+11.4
Conservative	Sarbani Mazumdar	1,817	37.9	−7.0
Labour	Colin Roberts	1,809	37.8	+10.2
Labour	Paul White	1,672	34.9	+11.3
Green	Ciaran Butler	713	14.9	+4.3
UKIP	John Harmsen	361	7.5	N/A
Liberal Democrats	Ashley Day	348	7.3	−15.0
Liberal Democrats	Oliver Bailey	329	6.9	−10.9
Turnout		4,790	38.3	
Conservative hold		Swing		
Conservative hold		Swing		
Labour gain from Conservative		Swing		

East Putney (3)
Party	Candidate	Votes	%	±%
Conservative	Leslie McDonnell	2,261	52.9	−2.5
Conservative	George Crivelli	2,233	52.2	+1.8
Conservative	Ravi Govindia	2,134	49.9	−1.2
Labour	Eileen Flanagan	1,050	24.6	+4.6
Labour	Joe Gibbons	937	21.9	+2.0
Labour	Bob Knowles	858	20.1	+1.6
Green	Richard Morris	644	15.1	+7.1
Liberal Democrats	Fernanda Miucci-Casale	501	11.7	−8.3
Liberal Democrats	Godfrey Shocket	402	9.4	−7.7
Liberal Democrats	John Williams	387	9.1	−7.5
UKIP	Mike Wells	363	8.5	N/A
Turnout		4,276	35.8	
Conservative hold		Swing		
Conservative hold		Swing		
Conservative hold		Swing		

Fairfield (3)
Party	Candidate	Votes	%	±%
Conservative	Piers McCausland	1,924	53.4	+3.3
Conservative	Will Sweet	1,801	50.0	−4.7
Conservative	Stuart Thom	1,752	48.6	−1.3
Labour	Liane Cresswell	1,021	28.3	+4.0
Labour	Caroline Sharp	958	26.6	+3.4
Labour	Fred Ponsonby	925	25.7	+4.1
Green	Antony Waterman	598	16.6	+3.9
Liberal Democrats	Patrick Warren	374	10.4	−6.8
Liberal Democrats	Paul Scaping	325	9.0	−11.2
UKIP	Jacqueline Johnstone	271	7.5	N/A
Independent	Seymour McLean	171	4.7	N/A
Turnout		3,605	31.8	
Conservative hold		Swing		
Conservative hold		Swing		
Conservative hold		Swing		

Furzedown (3)
Party	Candidate	Votes	%	±%
Labour	Leonie Cooper	3,101	62.6	+10.5
Labour	Candida Jones	2,852	57.5	+8.5
Labour	Mark Thomas	2,829	57.1	+10.9
Conservative	India Brummitt	1,107	22.3	−7.1
Conservative	Tracey Scott	1,036	20.9	−8.0
Conservative	Greg Munro	990	20.0	−5.3
Green	Michael Day	530	10.7	+3.7
Green	Timothy Turner	511	10.3	+2.4
UKIP	Laurence Richins	303	6.1	N/A
Liberal Democrats	David Patterson	254	5.1	−10.2
TUSC	Kim Hendry	121	2.4	N/A
Turnout		4,957	43.7	
Labour hold		Swing		
Labour hold		Swing		
Labour hold		Swing		

Graveney (3)
Party	Candidate	Votes	%	±%
Labour	Andy Gibbons	2,633	60.2	+15.9
Labour	Alaina Macdonald	2,595	59.3	+20.8
Labour	Rex Osborn	2,471	56.5	+14.3
Conservative	Harriet Baker	964	22.0	−1.3
Conservative	Chris White	801	18.3	−3.4
Conservative	Rakesh Mazumdar	784	17.9	−0.2
Green	Neil Partridge	620	14.2	+5.4
Liberal Democrats	Stephanie Dearden	348	8.0	−22.3
Liberal Democrats	Ted Clapham	311	7.1	−24.4
UKIP	David Perry	249	5.7	N/A
Liberal Democrats	Michael Clifton	239	5.5	−21.5
TUSC	Laurence Maples	98	2.2	N/A
Turnout		4,375	38.1	
Labour hold		Swing		
Labour hold		Swing		
Labour hold		Swing		

Latchmere (3)
Party	Candidate	Votes	%	±%
Labour	Anthony Belton	2,172	54.7	+7.0
Labour	Wendy Speck	1,933	48.7	+4.9
Labour	Simon Hogg	1,899	47.8	+4.7
Conservative	Matthew Plummer	1,218	30.7	−3.0
Conservative	Rose Sintim	1,203	30.3	−2.4
Conservative	Rosemary Summerfield	1,096	27.6	−2.7
Green	Peter Mason	508	12.8	+4.5
UKIP	Angela Tinkler	327	8.2	N/A
Liberal Democrats	Hollie Voyce	221	5.6	−10.4
Liberal Democrats	Richard Davis	213	5.4	−9.2
TUSC	Robert Edwards	106	2.7	N/A
Turnout		3,970	34.9	
Labour hold		Swing		
Labour hold		Swing		
Labour hold		Swing		

Nightingale (3)
Party	Candidate	Votes	%	±%
Conservative	Sarah McDermott	2,122	51.3	+0.8
Conservative	Richard Field	2,057	49.7	+4.9
Conservative	Ian Hart	1,984	47.9	−1.1
Labour	Mark Panto	1,189	28.7	+6.3
Labour	Nick Osborne	1,136	27.5	+0.2
Labour	Billi Randall	1,059	25.6	+2.9
Green	Susan Bradley	713	17.2	N/A
Green	Bruce Mackenzie	493	11.9	−0.3
Liberal Democrats	Caroline Ogden	443	10.7	−11.3
Liberal Democrats	Susan Shocket	247	6.0	−12.1
UKIP	Strachan McDonald	214	5.2	N/A
Turnout		4,138	36.4	
Conservative hold		Swing		
Conservative hold		Swing		
Conservative hold		Swing		

Northcote (3)
Party	Candidate	Votes	%	±%
Conservative	Jane Dodd	2,198	60.2	+0.1
Conservative	Peter Dawson	2,187	59.9	+4.3
Conservative	Martin Johnson	1,984	54.3	+1.1
Labour	Harvey Heath	888	24.3	+4.8
Labour	Gareth Noble	805	22.0	−0.6
Labour	Shalu Kanal	761	20.8	+4.8
Green	Guy Evans	623	17.0	+9.5
Liberal Democrats	Christine Green	388	10.6	−4.7
Liberal Democrats	Jake Beavan	355	9.7	−6.6
UKIP	David Nabarro	198	5.4	N/A
Turnout		3,654	33.3	
Conservative hold		Swing		
Conservative hold		Swing		
Conservative hold		Swing		

Queenstown (3)
Party	Candidate	Votes	%	±%
Conservative	Nicola Nardelli	1,773	41.1	−1.9
Labour	Sally-Ann Ephson	1,753	40.6	+5.2
Conservative	Marie Hanson	1,711	39.6	−3.3
Conservative	John Marsh	1,678	38.9	−2.4
Labour	Mark Rowney	1,665	38.6	+4.0
Labour	Peter Taylor	1,650	38.2	+6.5
Green	Marian Hoffman	401	9.3	N/A
Green	Brian Barnes	385	8.9	+0.6
UKIP	Richard Shuttleworth	313	7.3	N/A
Green	Joe Stuart	306	7.1	−0.2
Liberal Democrats	Adrian Smith	237	5.5	−11.0
Liberal Democrats	David Walden	151	3.5	−9.7
Turnout		4,317	35.8	
Conservative hold		Swing		
Labour gain from Conservative		Swing		
Conservative hold		Swing		

Roehampton and Putney Heath (3)
Party	Candidate	Votes	%	±%
Labour	Sue McKinney	1,964	51.1	+13.0
Labour	Peter Carpenter	1,870	48.6	+9.8
Labour	Jeremy Ambache	1,865	48.5	+13.7
Conservative	Peter Anthony	1,423	37.0	−4.8
Conservative	Martin McGann	1,300	33.8	−4.1
Conservative	Jenny Nickels	1,285	33.4	−6.5
UKIP	Edwina Turner	394	10.2	N/A
Green	Graham Humphreys	379	9.9	+2.3
Liberal Democrats	Katia Petros	168	4.4	−14.7
Liberal Democrats	Toby Fenwick	159	4.1	−12.2
Liberal Democrats	Moira Sanders	115	3.0	−12.5
Turnout		3,844	35.0	
Labour gain from Conservative		Swing		
Labour gain from Conservative		Swing		
Labour hold		Swing		

Shaftesbury (3)
Party	Candidate	Votes	%	±%
Conservative	James Cousins	1,932	52.1	−1.1
Conservative	Jonathan Cook	1,850	49.9	−2.6
Conservative	Guy Senior	1,794	48.4	−1.8
Labour	Martin Linton	1,227	33.1	+4.7
Labour	Kate Stock	1,084	29.2	+5.6
Labour	Remi al-Ameen	1,030	27.8	+6.5
Green	Caroline Austin	604	16.3	+9.1
Liberal Democrats	Patrick Montgomery	391	10.5	−6.8
TUSC	Hugh van de l'Isle	96	2.6	N/A
Turnout		3,709	33.0	
Conservative hold		Swing		
Conservative hold		Swing		
Conservative hold		Swing		

Southfields (3)
Party	Candidate	Votes	%	±%
Conservative	Kim Caddy	2,302	45.7	−5.7
Conservative	Guy Humphries	2,291	45.5	−4.1
Conservative	Terry Walsh	2,172	43.1	−5.1
Labour	Ian Tattum	1,394	27.7	+3.6
Labour	Maureen Booker	1,328	26.4	+2.9
Labour	Liz Martin	1,252	24.9	+3.0
Independent	Rob Richman	1,106	22.0	N/A
Green	Connie Hunter	773	15.3	+7.7
Liberal Democrats	Lucy Griffin-Beale	460	9.1	−11.1
Liberal Democrats	Anna Ahmed	443	8.8	−10.7
Liberal Democrats	Hugh Brown	300	6.0	−10.2
Turnout		5,037	39.7	
Conservative hold		Swing		
Conservative hold		Swing		
Conservative hold		Swing		

St Mary's Park (3)
Party	Candidate	Votes	%	±%
Conservative	Melanie Hampton	2,201	51.1	−0.6
Conservative	Tessa Strickland	2,066	48.0	+0.2
Conservative	Rory O'Broin	2,030	47.2	−3.5
Labour	Dan Garrigan	1,363	31.7	+3.7
Labour	Carmel Pollen	1,270	29.5	+2.7
Labour	Clayton Pearce	1,180	27.4	+3.2
Green	Lois Davis	718	16.7	+6.0
UKIP	Neil Hamilton	396	9.2	N/A
Liberal Democrats	Jeremy Porter	372	8.6	−5.2
Turnout		4,305	33.5	
Conservative hold		Swing		
Conservative hold		Swing		
Conservative hold		Swing		

Thamesfield (3)
Party	Candidate	Votes	%	±%
Conservative	Clare Torrington	2,579	57.1	−1.4
Conservative	Michael Ryder	2,466	54.6	−7.0
Conservative	James Madden	2,437	53.9	−4.2
Labour	Janet Grimshaw	953	21.1	+1.6
Labour	Stephen Gibbons	880	19.5	+2.2
Green	Francis Carter	846	18.7	+8.1
Labour	Christopher Locke	790	17.5	+2.6
Liberal Democrats	Henry Compson	554	12.3	−6.2
Liberal Democrats	Peter Johnson	479	10.6	−4.3
Liberal Democrats	Nick Zhang	399	8.8	−4.2
UKIP	William Payne	298	6.6	N/A
Turnout		4,520	37.5	
Conservative hold		Swing		
Conservative hold		Swing		
Conservative hold		Swing		

Tooting (3)
Party	Candidate	Votes	%	±%
Labour	Annamarie Critchard	2,499	49.7	+2.7
Labour	James Daley	2,495	49.6	+6.2
Labour	Ben Johnson	2,371	47.2	+1.9
Conservative	Robert Hughes	1,583	31.5	−1.5
Conservative	James Raynor	1,525	30.3	+1.0
Conservative	Shakeel Syed	1,427	28.4	−0.8
Green	Esther Obiri-Darko	622	12.4	+5.0
Liberal Democrats	Jon Irwin	361	7.2	−7.6
Liberal Democrats	Giles Derrington	327	6.5	−7.6
UKIP	Mark Bennett	292	5.8	N/A
Liberal Democrats	Simon Sharich	286	5.7	−7.1
TUSC	David Maples	115	2.3	N/A
Communist	Phil Brand	112	2.2	+0.3
Turnout		5,027	41.6	
Labour hold		Swing		
Labour hold		Swing		
Labour hold		Swing		

Wandsworth Common (3)
Party	Candidate	Votes	%	±%
Conservative	Claire Clay	2,598	62.3	−0.6
Conservative	Maurice Heaster	2,396	57.4	−3.6
Conservative	Katharine Tracey	2,313	55.4	−2.5
Labour	Sophia Murday	916	22.0	+2.3
Labour	Richard Metcalf	903	21.6	+3.1
Labour	Kieran Cunningham	875	21.0	+4.8
Green	Michael Schwarz	574	13.8	+4.2
Liberal Democrats	Susan John-Richards	404	9.7	−4.9
UKIP	Robert Pasley-Tyler	327	7.8	N/A
Turnout		4,172	39.2	
Conservative hold		Swing		
Conservative hold		Swing		
Conservative hold		Swing		

West Hill (3)
Party	Candidate	Votes	%	±%
Conservative	Nick Cuff	2,138	47.2	+0.3
Conservative	Malcolm Grimston	1,880	41.5	−2.7
Conservative	Andrew Peterkin	1,810	40.0	−9.7
Labour	Angie Ireland	1,420	31.4	+2.8
Labour	Basheer Khan	1,413	31.2	+3.9
Labour	Stephen Gallagher	1,256	27.8	+3.2
Green	Tom Sokolowski	625	13.8	+3.0
Liberal Democrats	Catherine Devons	519	11.5	−5.8
UKIP	Hugo van Randwyck	388	8.6	N/A
Liberal Democrats	Bernard Tyler	331	7.3	−9.1
Liberal Democrats	Chris Ward	253	5.6	−7.2
Turnout		4,526	37.4	
Conservative hold		Swing		
Conservative hold		Swing		
Conservative hold		Swing		

West Putney (3)
Party	Candidate	Votes	%	±%
Conservative	Jane Cooper	2,429	56.6	+2.0
Conservative	Ian Lewer	2,237	52.2	−2.1
Conservative	Steffi Sutters	2,221	51.8	+0.2
Labour	Jane Ayres	1,066	24.9	−0.5
Labour	James Roy	827	19.3	−2.3
Labour	Nigel Stevens	814	19.0	−2.0
Green	Alexandros Germanis	490	11.4	+2.8
Green	Edward Poole	486	11.3	N/A
Liberal Democrats	Eileen Cottis	449	10.5	−5.4
UKIP	Anthony Hodges	396	9.2	N/A
Liberal Democrats	Jamie Saddler	387	9.0	−6.6
Liberal Democrats	Rob Williams	297	6.9	−7.0
Turnout		4,289	37.6	
Conservative hold		Swing		
Conservative hold		Swing		
Conservative hold		Swing		
