= East Grinstead and Uckfield =

UK Parliament constituency (since 2024)

Coordinates: 51.02°N 0°E

- County constituency for the House of Commons
- Interactive map of boundaries from 2024
- Boundary of East Grinstead and Uckfield in South East England
- County: West Sussex; East Sussex
- Electorate: 72,356 (2023)
- Major settlements: East Grinstead and Uckfield

Current constituency
- Created: 2024
- Member of Parliament: Mims Davies (Conservative)
- Seats: One
- Created from: Mid Sussex, Horsham, Wealden & Lewes (part)

East Grinstead and Uckfield is a constituency of the House of Commons in the UK Parliament. Further to the completion of the 2023 Periodic Review of Westminster constituencies, it was first contested at the 2024 general election. It is currently represented by Mims Davies of the Conservative Party; she was previously MP for Eastleigh from 2015 to 2019 and MP for Mid Sussex from 2019 to 2024.

== Constituency profile ==
East Grinstead and Uckfield is a rural constituency covering parts of East and West Sussex. Much of the constituency lies within the High Weald National Landscape, a protected area of hills and woodlands. East Grinstead is the constituency's largest town, with a population of around 27,000. Other settlements include the town of Uckfield and the villages of Copthorne, Crawley Down, Forest Row, Maresfield and Buxted. The constituency is affluent, particularly in East Grinstead, and house prices are considerably higher than the national average.

In general, residents of the constituency are older and well-educated. Household income is high and residents are likely to work in professional occupations. White people made up 94% of the population at the 2021 census. At the local council level, East Grinstead is mostly represented by Conservatives, Uckfield mostly by the Labour Party and the rural areas mostly by the Green Party. Voters were evenly split on the question of European Union membership, with an estimated 50% voting for each option in the 2016 referendum.

== Boundaries ==
The constituency, which crosses the boundary between East Sussex and West Sussex, is composed of the following (after taking into account the 2023 local government review in Mid Sussex):

- The District of Lewes wards of: Chailey, Barcombe & Hamsey; Newick; Wivelsfield.
- The District of Mid Sussex wards of: Ardingly, Balcombe & Turners Hill (most); Ashurst Wood & East Grinstead South; Copthorne & Worth; Crawley Down; East Grinstead Ashplats; East Grinstead Baldwins; East Grinstead Herontye; East Grinstead Imberhorne; East Grinstead Town; Handcross & Pease Pottage; Lindfield Rural & High Weald (most).
- The District of Wealden wards of: Buxted; Danehill & Fletching; Forest Row; Maresfield; Uckfield East; Uckfield New Town; Uckfield North; Uckfield Ridgewood & Little Horsted.

It comprises the following areas:

- Northern parts of the District of Mid Sussex, including the town of East Grinstead, transferred from the constituencies of Horsham and Mid Sussex
- Western parts of the District of Wealden, including the town of Uckfield, transferred from the constituency of Wealden (renamed Sussex Weald)
- A small rural area in the District of Lewes, transferred from the constituency of Lewes

== Members of Parliament ==
Mid Sussex, Wealden and Horsham prior to 2024

Election	Member	Party
2024	Mims Davies	Conservative

== Elections ==
=== Elections in the 2020s ===
General election 2024: East Grinstead and Uckfield
Party	Candidate	Votes	%	±%
Conservative	Mims Davies	19,319	38.3	−20.2
Liberal Democrats	Benedict Dempsey	10,839	21.5	−1.5
Labour	Ben Cox	10,440	20.7	+7.1
Green	Christina Coleman	5,277	10.5	+5.6
Independent	Ian Gibson	2,482	4.9	N/A
English Democrat	William Highton	2,036	4.0	N/A
Majority		8,480	16.8	−18.7
Turnout		50,393	67.5	−11.6
Registered electors		75,385		
Conservative hold		Swing	−9.4	

=== Elections in the 2010s ===
2019 notional result
Party	Vote	%
Conservative	33,462	58.5
Liberal Democrats	13,171	23.0
Labour	7,768	13.6
Green	2,830	4.9
Turnout	57,231	79.1
Electorate	72,356	

== See also ==
- List of parliamentary constituencies in West Sussex
- List of parliamentary constituencies in East Sussex
- List of parliamentary constituencies in the South East England (region)
